= Cristian Castro discography =

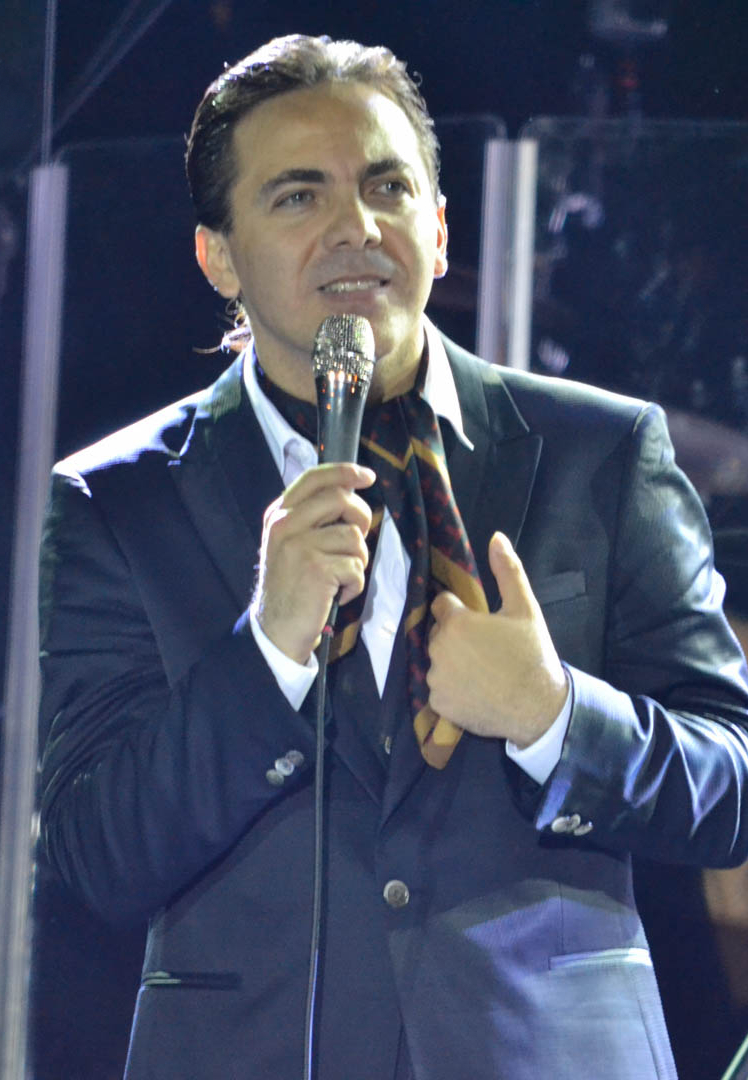
- Castro in 2015
- Studio albums: 16
- Compilation albums: 20
- Singles: 41
- Music videos: 31

The discography of Mexican Latin pop singer-songwriter Cristian Castro.

== Albums ==
=== Studio albums ===
List of studio albums, with selected chart positions and certifications
| Title | Album details | Peak chart positions | | | | | Certifications |
| Title | Album details | MEX | ARG | SPA | US | US Latin | Certifications |
|---|---|---|---|---|---|---|---|
| Agua Nueva | Released: June 30, 1992; Label: Fonovisa; Formats: CD, cassette | — | — | — | — | 48 | AMPROFON: 2× Platinum |
| Un Segundo en el Tiempo | Released: July 20, 1993; Label: Fonovisa; Formats: CD, cassette | — | — | — | — | — | |
| El Camino del Alma | Released: August 15, 1994; Label: Fonovisa; Formats: CD, cassette | — | — | — | — | 5 | |
| El Deseo de Oír Tu Voz | Released: January 23, 1996; Label: Fonovisa; Formats: CD, cassette | — | — | — | — | 4 | |
| Lo mejor de mí | Released: September 30, 1997; Label: Fonovisa; Formats: CD, cassette | — | 1 | — | — | 5 | AMPROFON: 2× Gold; RIAA: 2× Platinum (Latin) |
| Mi Vida Sin Tu Amor | Released: June 1, 1999; Label: BMG U.S. Latin; Formats: CD, cassette | — | 7 | — | — | 7 | AMPROFON: Platinum; CAPIF: 3× Platinum; RIAA: 4× Platinum (Latin) |
| Azul | Released: June 5, 2001; Label: BMG U.S. Latin; Formats: CD, cassette | — | 2 | 75 | 193 | 2 | AMPROFON: Platinum; CAPIF: Platinum; RIAA: 2× Platinum (Latin); Promusicae: Platinum |
| Amar Es | Released: September 30, 2003; Label: Sony BMG Latin; Formats: CD, cassette | — | — | 75 | 167 | 4 | AMPROFON: Platinum; CAPIF: Gold |
| Hoy Quiero Soñar | Released: November 23, 2004; Label: Sony BMG Latin; Formats: CD, cassette | — | — | 31 | — | 13 | |
| Días Felices | Released: November 15, 2005; Label: Universal Latino; Formats: CD | — | — | 36 | — | 16 | AMPROFON: Gold; RIAA: Platinum (Latin) |
| El Indomable | Released: June 26, 2007; Label: Universal Latino; Formats: CD | 9 | — | 92 | 114 | 4 | RIAA: Platinum (Latin) |
| El Culpable Soy Yo | Released: April 28, 2009; Label: Universal Latino; Formats: CD | 47 | — | 71 | — | 7 | |
| Viva el Principe | Released: November 30, 2010; Label: Universal Latino; Formats: CD | 1 | — | 44 | 59 | 1 | AMPROFON: Diamond; RIAA: 2× Platinum (Latin) |
| Mi Amigo El Príncipe | Released: November 1, 2011; Label: Universal Latino; Formats: CD | 2 | — | 16 | 57 | 2 | AMPROFON: Platinum+Gold |
| Dicen | Released: September 30, 2016; Label: Sony Music Latin; Formats: CD | — | — | 95 | — | 19 | |
| Mi Tributo a Juan Gabriel | Released: August 24, 2018; Label: Sony Music Latin; Formats: CD | — | — | — | — | — | |
"—" denotes items which were not released in that country, failed to chart, or that the chart position is unknown.

=== Live albums ===
List of studio albums, with selected chart positions and certifications
| Title | Album details | Peak chart positions | | | | | Certifications |
| Title | Album details | MEX | ARG | SPA | US | US Latin | Certifications |
|---|---|---|---|---|---|---|---|
| Primera Fila: Dia 1 | Released: April 2, 2013; Label: Sony Music Latin; Formats: CD, DVD | — | — | — | — | 13 | AMPROFON: Platinum |
| Primera Fila: Dia 2 | Released: April 1, 2014; Label: Sony Music Latin; Formats: CD, DVD | — | — | — | — | 50 | |
"—" denotes items which were not released in that country, failed to chart, or that the chart position is unknown.

=== Compilation albums ===
| Title | Album details | Chart positions | | | | Certifications |
| Title | Album details | MEX | ARG | SPA | US Latin | Certifications |
|---|---|---|---|---|---|---|
| Exitos | Released: 4 September 1996; Label: Fonovisa; Formats: CD, cassette | — | — | — | 43 | |
| 20 kilates musicales | Released: 23 December 1996; Label: Universal Music Latino; Formats: CD, cassette | — | — | — | — | |
| Mis mejores momentos | Released: 28 October 1997; Label: Universal Music Latino; Formats: CD, cassette | — | — | — | 9 | |
| Serie millenium 21 | Released: 10 August 1999; Label: Universal Music Latino; Formats: CD, cassette | — | — | — | — | |
| La sensaeión de Cristian | Released: 14 November 2000; Label: Universal Music Latino; Formats: CD, cassette | — | — | — | — | |
| Serie 32 | Released: 30 November 2001; Label: Universal Music Latino; Formats: CD, cassette | — | — | — | — | |
| Favoritas con amor | Released: 12 February 2002; Label: Universal Music Latino; Formats: CD, cassette | — | — | — | — | |
| Edicionlimitada | Released: 16 April 2002; Label: Universal Music Latino; Formats: CD, cassette | — | — | — | — | |
| Grandes Hits | Released: 10 September 2002; Label: RCA; Formats: CD, cassette | — | — | 9 | 13 | AMPROFON: Gold; CAPIF: Gold |
| Esenciales: The Ultimate Collection | Released: 26 November 2002; Label: Universal Music Latino | — | — | — | — | |
| 15 Greatest Hits | Released: 4 February 2003; Label: Universal Music Latino; Formats: CD, cassette | — | — | — | — | |
| 18 grandes exitos | Released: 28 October 2003; Label: Universal Music Latino; Formats: CD, cassette | — | — | — | — | CAPIF: 2× Platinum |
| Canciones que amo | Released: 28 October 2003; Label: Universal Music Latino; Formats: CD, cassette | — | — | — | — | CAPIF: Gold |
| Oro | Released: 28 October 2003; Label: Universal Music Latino; Formats: CD, cassette | — | — | — | — | CAPIF: Gold |
| Nunca voy a olvidarte...los exitos | Released: 4 October 2005; Label: Sony BMG; Formats: CD | — | — | — | — | |
| Dos en uno | Released: 13 June 2006; Label: Universal Music Latino; Formats: CD, cassette | — | — | — | — | |
| Amor y muchos exitos mas: linea de oro | Released: 17 October 2006; Label: Universal Music Latino; Formats: CD, cassette | — | — | — | — | |
| e5 | Released: 14 November 2006; Label: Universal Music Latino; Formats: CD, cassette | — | — | — | — | |
| El comienzo de la historia | Released: 31 March 2009; Label: Universal Music Latino; Formats: CD, cassette | — | — | — | — | |
| 6 Super Hits | Released: 17 November 2009; Label: Universal Music Latino; Formats: CD, cassette | — | — | — | — | |
| | "—" denotes items which were not released in that country, failed to chart, or that the chart position is unknown. | | | | | |

== Singles ==
List of Spanish singles, with selected chart positions and certifications, showing year released and album name
| Title | Year | Peak chart positions | | | | Album |
| Title | Year | SPA | US Latin | US Latin Pop | US | Album |
|---|---|---|---|---|---|---|
| "No podrás" | 1992 | — | 3 | — | — | Agua nueva |
| "Solo dame una noche" ("Tamin' the Wild Night") | 1993 | — | 9 | — | — | Agua nueva |
| "Agua nueva" | 1993 | — | 29 | — | — | Agua nueva |
| "Diez mil lagrimas" | 1993 | — | 35 | — | — | Agua nueva |
| "Nunca voy a olvidarte" | 1993 | — | 1 | — | — | Un segundo en el tiempo |
| "Es mejor así" | 1994 | — | 18 | — | — | Un segundo en el tiempo |
| "Por amor a tí" | 1994 | — | 4 | — | — | Un segundo en el tiempo |
| "Mañana" | 1994 | — | 2 | 1 | — | El camino del alma |
| "Con tu amor" | 1995 | — | 4 | 1 | — | El camino del alma |
| "Azul gris" | 1995 | — | 10 | 1 | — | El camino del alma |
| "Morelia" | 1995 | — | 30 | 6 | — | El deseo de oír tu voz |
| "Vuelveme a querer" | 1995 | — | 2 | 1 | — | Boleros: Por Amor y Desamor |
| "Amor" | 1996 | — | 1 | 1 | — | El Deseo de Oír Tu Voz |
| "Amarte a ti" | 1996 | — | 1 | 1 | — | El Deseo de Oír Tu Voz |
| "No puedo arrancarte de mi" | 1996 | — | 3 | 2 | — | El Deseo de Oír Tu Voz |
| "Esperándote" | 1996 | — | 6 | 3 | — | El Deseo de Oír Tu Voz |
| "Una y mil veces" | 1997 | — | — | 17 | — | El Deseo de Oír Tu Voz |
| "Lo Mejor de Mí" | 1997 | — | 1 | 1 | — | Lo Mejor de Mí |
| "Si Tú Me Amaras" | 1998 | — | 5 | 3 | — | Lo Mejor de Mí |
| "Lloran Las Rosas" | 1998 | — | 9 | 3 | — | Lo Mejor de Mí |
| "Después de Ti...¿Qué?" (featuring Raúl di Blasio) | 1999 | — | 24 | 7 | — | Lo Mejor de Mí |
| "Mi Vida Sin Tu Amor" | 1999 | — | 3 | 2 | — | Mi Vida Sin Tu Amor |
| "Alguna Vez" | 1999 | — | 2 | 2 | — | Mi Vida Sin Tu Amor |
| "Volver a Amar" | 1999 | — | 4 | 2 | 122 | Mi Vida Sin Tu Amor |
| "Por Amarte Así" | 2000 | — | 3 | 2 | — | Mi Vida Sin Tu Amor |
| "Azul" | 2001 | — | 1 | 1 | 105 | Azul |
| "Yo Quería" | 2001 | 17 | 6 | 3 | — | Azul |
| "Lloviendo Estrellas" | 2002 | 16 | 13 | 8 | — | Azul |
| "Con Ella" | 2002 | — | 9 | 6 | — | Azul |
| "Cuando Me Miras Así" | 2002 | — | 2 | 1 | — | Grandes Hits |
| "No Hace Falta" | 2003 | — | 6 | 5 | — | Amar Es |
| "Te Llamé" | 2004 | — | 3 | 2 | — | Amar Es |
| "Te Buscaría" | 2004 | — | 2 | 1 | 110 | Hoy Quiero Soñar |
| "Amor Eterno" | 2005 | — | 1 | 1 | 78 | Días Felices |
| "Sin Tu Amor" | 2006 | — | 18 | 9 | — | Días Felices |
| "Tu Retirada" | 2007 | — | 36 | 25 | — | El Indomable |
| "Te Sigo Queriendo" | 2007 | — | 49 | — | — | El Indomable |
| "No Me Digas" | 2009 | — | 49 | 23 | — | El Culpable Soy Yo |
| "El Culpable Soy Yo" | 2009 | — | 9 | 6 | — | El Culpable Soy Yo |
| "La Nave del Olvido" | 2010 | — | 48 | 22 | — | Viva el Principe |
| "Amor, Amor" | 2010 | — | — | — | — | Viva el Principe |
| "Lo Dudo" | 2011 | — | — | — | — | Mi Amigo El Príncipe |
| "Buenos Dias Amor" | 2012 | — | — | — | — | Mi Amigo El Príncipe |
| "Dame La Llave de tu Corazón" | 2012 | — | — | — | — | single-only |
| "Mi Vida" | 2012 | — | — | — | — | Celebrando Al Príncipe |
| "Enamorados" | 2013 | — | — | 36 | — | Primera Fila: Dia 1 |
| "Así Era Ella" | 2013 | — | 44 | 17 | — | Primera Fila: Dia 1 |
| "Es Mejor Así" (featuring Reik) | 2013 | — | — | — | — | Primera Fila: Dia 1 |
| "Déjame Conmigo" | 2014 | — | — | 24 | — | Primera Fila: Dia 2 |
| "Decirte Adios" | 2016 | — | — | 32 | — | Dicen |
| "Simplemente Tu" | 2017 | — | — | — | — | Dicen |
"—" denotes items which were not released in that country, failed to chart, or that the chart position is unknown.

=== As featured performer ===
| Title | Year | Peak chart positions | Album |
| Title | Year | US Latin Songs | Album |
|---|---|---|---|
| "Escondidos" (Olga Tañón featuring Cristian Castro) | 1998 | 4 | Te Acordarás de Mí |
| "Pasion" (Grupo Limite featuring Cristian) | 1999 | – | De Corazon al Corazon |
| "Por Amarte Así" (Ana Isabelle featuring Cristian Castro) | 2010 | 14 | Mi Sueño |
| "Resistiré México" (among Artists for Mexico) | 2020 | – | Non-album single |

== Other duets ==
- "Después De Ti… ¿Qué?" — José Feliciano
- "El Día Que Te Conocí" — Armando Manzanero
- "Ella" (Her) — José Alfredo Jiménez
- "Flying Without Wings" — Westlife
- "Primavera" ("Spring") — Carlos Santana
- "Nada Sin Tu Amor" ("Nothing Without Your Love") — Tamara
- "Todo Para Ti" ("Everything For You") — "Michael Jackson, Luis Miguel, Ricky Martín, Julio Iglesias, etc."
- "El Poder de la Música" ("The Power Of Music") "(Live) — Feat. Various Artists"
- "Que voy Hacer Conmigo ("That I go To do with Me") — César Franco
- "Es Amor ("It is a love") — Yanni & Ranga
- "Ni La Fuerza Del Destino ("Not even the force of the destiny") — Yanni
- "Mil Besos ("Thousand kisses") — Victor Yturbe
- "El Culpable Soy Yo"— RKM & Ken—Y (reggaeton version), Carlos y Alejandra (bachata version), Banda MS (banda version)
- "No Me Digas (Remix)" — Jayko
- "Somos El Mundo" — With various artists
- "Te Amaré Más Allá" – Ha*Ash
- "Luces De Nueva York" - La Sonora Santanera
- "Así Era Ella" - Elvis Crespo

== Music videos ==
List of music videos, showing year released and director
| Title | Year | Director(s) |
|---|---|---|
| "No Podras (video 1)" | 1992 | Valentin Pimstein |
| "No Podras (video 2)" | 1992 | |
| "Agua Nueva" | 1993 | |
| "Para Ti" | 1993 | |
| "Nunca Voy A Olvidarte" | 1993 | Hugo Massa |
| "Mañana" | 1994 | Salvador Ortega, Cristian Castro |
| "Con Tu Amor" | 1995 | |
| "Amor" | 1996 | Cristian Castro |
| "No Puedo Arrancarte de Mi" | 1996 | Cristian Castro |
| "El Deseo de Oir Tu Voz" | 1996 | Cristian Castro |
| "Lo Mejor de Mi" | 1997 | Willie Souza, Cristian Castro |
| "Si Tu Me Amaras" | 1997 | Dudu Scuderi |
| "Lloran Las Rosas" | 1998 | J.C. Barros |
| "Tu Corazon" | 1998 | Barry Cook, Tony Bancroft |
| "Despues de Ti…¿Que?" (ft. Raul di Blasio) | 1998 | |
| "Mi Vida Sin Tu Amor" | 1999 | Felipe Gomez |
| "Volver a Amar" | 2000 | Simon Brand |
| "Azul" | 2001 | Pedro Torres |
| "Yo Queria (video 1)" | 2001 | Fabian De Hoyos, Cristian Magali |
| "Yo Queria (video 2)" | 2001 | |
| "Lloviendo Estrellas" | 2002 | Paolo Scarfò |
| "Flying Without Wings" (Westlife ft. Cristian Castro) | 2002 | Brett Turnbull |
| "No Hace Falta" | 2003 | Emilio Estefan Jr. |
| "Te Buscaria" | 2004 | Alejandro Suaya |
| "Una Cancion Para Ti" | 2005 | Gaston Pérez |
| "Amor Eterno" | 2005 | Picky Talarico |
| "Sin Tu Amor" | 2006 | Picky Talarico |
| "Tu Retirada" | 2007 | Cristian Castro |
| "No Me Digas" | 2009 | Mihelle Castro |
| "El Culpable Soy Yo" | 2009 | Guillermo De Bosque |
| "Por Amarte Asi" (Ana Isabelle ft. Cristian Castro) | 2010 | Pablo Croce |
| "La Nave del Olvido" | 2010 | Ricardo Moreno |
| "Amor, Amor" | 2011 | Antonio Acevedo Reyes |
| "Lo Dudo" | 2011 | Ricardo Calderon Malagamba |
| "Buenos Dias Amor" | 2012 | Ricardo Calderon Malagamba |
| "Enamorados" | 2013 | Matt Rollings, Aurelio Baqueiro, Miguel Roldan |
| "Asi Era Ella" | 2013 | Matt Rollings, Aurelio Baqueiro, Miguel Roldan |
| "Es Mejor Asi" (ft. Reik) | 2013 | Matt Rollings, Aurelio Baqueiro, Miguel Roldan |
| "Dejame Conmigo" | 2014 | Matt Rollings, Aurelio Baqueiro, Miguel Roldan |
| "Quiereme" (Genitallica ft. Coda & Cristian Castro) | 2014 | Chiva, Rika Davila, El Gallinero Creations, Genitallica, Fernando Salinas |
| "Beso Negro" (with La Esfinge) | 2014 | Virgili Jubero |
| "Tan Cerquita" (Aleks Syntek ft. Cristian Castro) | 2015 | Antonio Roma, Kalimba |
| "Entre La Espada y La Pared" (Agrupacion Cariño ft. Cristian Castro) | 2015 | Sacha Triujeque, Angel Flores Torres |
| "Destilando Amor" (Aaron y Su Grupo Ilusion ft. Cristian Castro) | 2016 | John Jairo Toro Osorio |
| "Fruto Robado" (La Sonora Santanera ft. Cristian Castro) | 2016 | Juan Luis Covarrubias, Gonzalo Ferrari |
| "Decirte Adios" | 2016 | Kai Parlange |
| "Nunca Voy A Olvidarte" (Bronco ft. Cristian Castro) | 2017 | Guillermo Gil |
| "Simplemente Tu" | 2017 | Emilio Castro Vizcarra |
| "De Cigarro En Cigarro" (Charlie Zaa ft. Cristian Castro) | 2017 | Mariano Perez Garcia, Gonzalo Ferrari Villar, Hector Alejandro Gonzalez Molina |
| "Como Un Duende" (Los Baby's ft. Cristian Castro) | 2017 | Armando Avila, Gonzalo Ferrari |
