= Nunca Voy a Olvidarte...Los Éxitos =

Nunca Voy A Olvidarte...Los Exitos

Greatest hits album by Cristian Castro
- Released: October 4, 2005
- Recorded: 1992–2004
- Genres: Latin pop, compilation
- Label: Sony Music Latin

Cristian Castro chronology
Hoy Quiero Soñar (2004)	Nunca Voy A Olvidarte...Los Exitos (2005)	Días Felices (2005)

Nunca Voy A Olvidarte...Los Exitos is the second greatest hits collection released from Mexican singer Cristian Castro. It was released on October 4, 2005 by Sony Music Latin.

== Track listing ==
CD track listing
No.	Title	Writer(s)	Length
1.	"No Podrás" (From Agua Nueva, 1992)	Alejandro Zepeda; Peter Skrabak	04:01
2.	"Nunca Voy a Olvidarte" (From Un Segundo en el Tiempo, 1993)	Roberto Belester	05:05
3.	"Mañana" (From El Camino del Alma, 1994)	Juan Gabriel	04:11
4.	"Vuélveme a Querer" (From Boleros: Por Amor Y Desamor, 1995)	Jorge Avendano Luhrs	04:11
5.	"Lo Mejor de Mí" (From Lo Mejor de Mí, 1997)	Rudy Pérez	03:55
6.	"Si Tú Me Amaras" (From Lo Mejor de Mí, 1997)	Rudy Pérez	04:17
7.	"Lloran Las Rosas" (from Lo Mejor de Mí, 1997)	Alfredo Matheus	04:27
8.	"Después De Ti...Qué" (From Lo Mejor De Mí, 1997)	Pérez	05:32
9.	"Volver A Amar" (From Mi Vida Sin Tu Amor, 1999)	Kike Santander	04:42
10.	"Mi Vida Sin Tú Amor" (From Mi Vida Sin Tú Amor, 1999)	Santander	03:35
11.	"Por Amarte Así" (From Mi Vida Sin Tú Amor, 1999)	Alejandro Montalbán; Eduardo Reyes	04:33
12.	"Lloviendo Estrellas" (Azul, 2001)	Montalbán; Reyes	04:18
13.	"Azul" (From Azul, 2001)	Santander; Gustavo Santander	04:21
14.	"No Hace Falta" (From Amar Es, 2003)	Emilio Estefan; Randall M. Barlow; Nicolas Tovar	04:44
15.	"Te Llamé" (From Amar Es, 2003)	Roberto Livi; Pérez	03:46
16.	"Te Buscaria" (From Hoy Quiero Soñar, 2004)	Cristian Castro; Osvaldo Iribarren; Daniel Montes	04:15
Total length:			69:52

DVD track listing
No.	Title	Writer(s)	Video Director	Length
1.	"No Podrás"	Alejandro Zepeda/Peter Skrabak	Valentin Pimstein	04:04
2.	"Nunca Voy A Olvidarte"	Roberto Belester	Hugo Massa	05:01
3.	"Mañana"	Juan Gabriel	Salvador Ortega/Cristian Castro	04:19
4.	"Lo Mejor De Mí"	Rudy Pérez	Willie Souza/Cristian Castro	04:04
5.	"Si Tú Me Amaras"	Rudy Pérez	Dudu Scuderi	04:17
6.	"Lloran Las Rosas"	Alfredo Matheus	J.C. Barros	04:27
7.	"Volver A Amar"	Kike Santander	Simón Brand	04:42
8.	"Mi Vida Sin Tú Amor"	Kike Santander	Felipe Gomez	03:52
9.	"Yo Quería"	Sandro Giacobbe/Toto Cutugno adapt. Cristian Castro		04:07
10.	"Lloviendo Estrellas"	Alejandro Montalbán/Eduardo Reyes	Paolo Scarfò	04:31
11.	"Azul"	Kike Santander/Gustavo Santander	Pedro Torres	04:25
12.	"No Hace Falta"	Emilio Estefan/Randall M. Barlow/Nicolas Tovar	Emilio Estefan Jr.	04:44
13.	"Una Canción Para Ti"	Kike Santander	Gaston Pérez	03:29
14.	"Te Buscaria"	Cristian Castro/Osvaldo Iribarren/Daniel Montes	Alejandro Suaya	04:12

== Charts ==
Chart (2005)	Peak position
U.S. Billboard Top Latin Albums	20
U.S. Billboard Latin Pop Albums	8
U.S. Billboard Heatseekers Albums	30
