= Grandes Hits =

Greatest hits album by Cristian Castro
- Released: September 10, 2002
- Recorded: 1997–2002
- Genre: Latin pop, compilation
- Label: BMG U.S. Latin

Cristian Castro chronology
Azul (2001)	Grandes Hits (2002)	Amar Es (2003)

Grandes Hits is the first greatest hits collection released from Mexican singer Cristian Castro. It was released on September 10, 2002 by BMG. The compilation featured three never released tracks from Cristian.

== Track listing ==
No.	Title	Writer(s)	Original album	Length
1.	"Lloran Las Rosas"	Alfredo Matheus	Lo Mejor de Mí	4:27
2.	"Por Amarte Así"	Alejandro Montalbán, Eduardo Reyes	Mi Vida Sin Tu Amor	4:32
3.	"Cuando Me Miras Así"	Adrián Possé, Marc Martín	Never released	4:21
4.	"Azul"	Kike Santander, Gustavo Santander	Azul	4:24
5.	"Volver A Amar"	Kike Santander	Mi Vida Sin Tu Amor	4:42
6.	"Escondidos (feat. Olga Tañon)"	Mauricio Abaroa, Rudy Pérez	Te Acordarás de Mí	4:28
7.	"Miedo"	Estéfano, Julio C. Reyes	Never released	4:48
8.	"Yo Quería"	Toto Cutugno (adapt. Cristian Castro)	Azul	4:18
9.	"Pasión (feat. Grupo Límite)"	Alicia Villareal	De Corazón al Corazón	4:18
10.	"Lloviendo Estrellas"	Alejandro Montalbán, Eduardo Reyes	Azul	4:17
11.	"Verónica"	Cristian Castro	Mi Vida Sin Tu Amor	4:35
12.	"Soledad"	Danilo Ballo	Never released	4:32
13.	"Ella (feat. José Alfredo Jiménez)"	José Alfredo Jiménez	Tributo a J.A. Jimenez	3:13
14.	"Mi Vida Sin Tu Amor"	Kike Santander	Mi Vida Sin Tu Amor	3:33
15.	"Lo Mejor de Mí"	Rudy Pérez	Lo Mejor de Mí	3:57
16.	"Después de Ti...¿Qué? (feat. Raúl Di Blasio)"	Rudy Pérez	Lo Mejor de Mí	5:30
Total length:				69:54

== Charts ==
Chart (2002)	Peak position
US Top Latin Albums (Billboard)	13
US Latin Pop Albums (Billboard)	8
US Heatseekers Albums (Billboard)	33

== Sales and certifications ==
Region	Certification	Certified units/sales
Argentina (CAPIF)	Gold	20,000^{^}
Mexico (AMPROFON)	Gold	75,000^{^}
Spain (PROMUSICAE)	Gold	50,000^{^}
^{^} Shipments figures based on certification alone.
