= Tony Carreira =

Portuguese musician

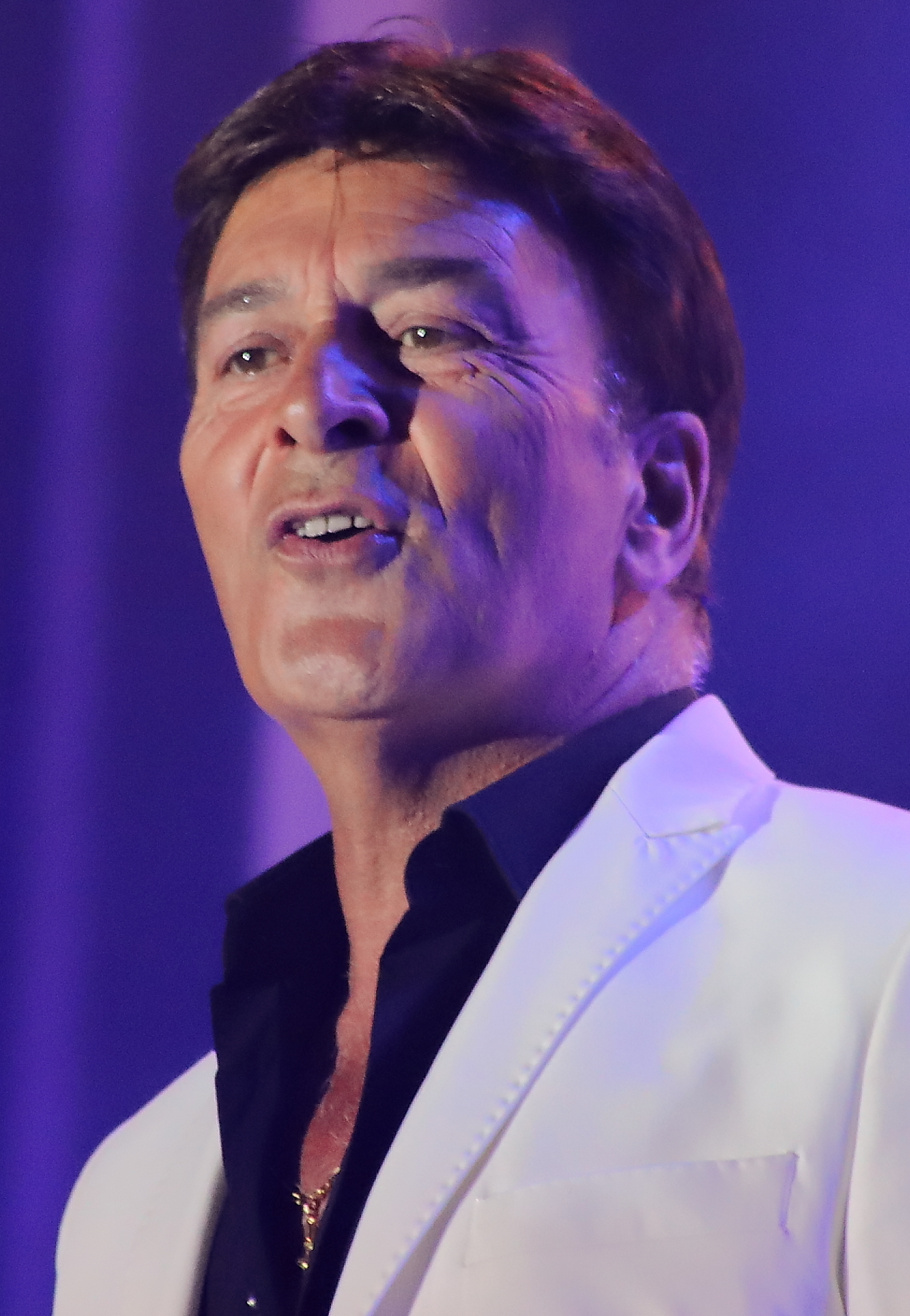
- Tony Carreira in 2023

Background information
- Born: António Manuel Mateus Antunes; 30 December 1963 (age 62); Armadouro, Pampilhosa da Serra, Portugal
- Genres: Portuguese Kitsch music; Schlager music; latin ballad; pimba
- Occupation: Singer
- Instruments: Vocals, Spanish guitar
- Years active: 1988–present
- Labels: Discossete; Espacial; Pomme; Farol; Sony Music Portugal
- Website: www.tonycarreira.com

António Manuel Mateus Antunes (European Portuguese pronunciation: [ɐ̃ˈtɔniu mɐnuˈɛɫ mɐˈtewz ɐ̃ˈtunɨʃ], born 30 December 1963), known professionally as Tony Carreira (European Portuguese pronunciation: [ˈtɔni kɐˈʁɐjɾɐ]), is a Portuguese singer and musician. Over the course of his career, he has become one of Portugal’s most popular romantic pop artists, releasing numerous successful albums, performing extensively in both Portugal and among Lusophone communities abroad, and earning recognition for his distinctive melodic style and emotional ballads.

== Early life ==
Carreira was born in the small rural locality of Armadouro, Pampilhosa da Serra, he moved to Paris at age 10 with his parents. He lived there for 20 years.

== Career ==
=== Early career (1988-2000) ===
Carreira's stage name was chosen in 1988 during a studio recording session for his first album by his French producer Patrick Oliver. That year he participated in the National Music Award in Figueira da Foz with the song "Uma Noite A teu Lado" (A Night By Your Side), which was one of eight songs selected for the RTP Song Festival that year. The single with the songs "Uma Noite A teu Lado" was released by the Transmédia label. Carreira recorded an album with the tracks "Uma Flor Vai Ficar" (A Flower Will Remain) and "Aprender A Viver não custa. O que custa é saber viver" (Learning to Live Doesn't Cost. What Costs is Knowing How to Live) in 1989.

In 1990, he signed a three-year record deal with Discossete. His first album for that label was recorded in 1991, titled "É Verão Portugal" (It's Summer, Portugal). One of the songs on the album, dedicated to his first son, was called "Meu Herói Pequeno" (My Little Hero). The song was played frequently on the radio, attracting the attention of presenter Carlos Ribeiro and becoming a big hit.

He recorded a new album in 1992, titled "Canta Canta Portugal" (Sing, Sing, Portugal), without significant success, which led to him being dropped by the record label.

He signed a contract with the Espacial record label in 1993. He recorded the album "Português de Alma e Coração" (Portuguese of Soul and Heart). One of the songs on the album was "A Minha Guitarra" (My Guitar), which was a great success, allowing the work to reach gold record status. That same year, he met Dino Meira. He dedicated the song "Adeus Amigo" (Goodbye Friend) to this popular singer, which was released the following year after his death.

The song "Ai, Destino" (Oh, Destiny), recorded in 1995, became a resounding success and definitively marked the romantic style that characterizes his work. Another platinum record in 1995, with the album "Adeus Até Um Dia" (Goodbye Until We Meet Again). That same year, he also participated in the recording of the album "Mãe Querida" (Dear Mother), which featured many other singers from the record label.

The following year, 1997, he released a new album: "Coração Perdido" (Lost Heart). A video for the song "Sonhos de Menino" (Dreams of a Boy) was filmed in his hometown, Armadouro. A year later, another album, "Sonhador, Sonhador" (Dreamer, Dreamer), was released, featuring hits such as "Coração Perdido", "Sonhos de Menino", and "Minha Velha Guitarra" (My Old Guitar), completing the cycle of his first 10 years in the music industry.

The year 1999 brought a turning point to his career. He released the album "Dois Corações Sozinhos" (Two Lonely Hearts), which included songs such as "Depois de Ti, Mais Nada" (After You, Nothing More), "Dois Corações Sozinhos" (Two Lonely Hearts) and "Quando eras Minha" (When You Were Mine). It went gold. He received the TVI award for best male singer and for best romantic song.

It was in January 2000 that he made his mark on the stages of Paris. His performance was recorded, resulting in the release of the album "Ao vivo no Olympia" (Live at the Olympia), which went triple platinum. It remained on the best-selling albums charts in Portugal for 54 weeks, 37 of which were at number one.

=== Continued success (2001-2010) ===
In 2001, a year later, Tony returned to the Olympia stage, once again with great success. 2002 brought the singer to an exciting concert at the Coliseu dos Recreios in Lisbon. He released "Cantor de Sonhos" (Singer of Dreams). That year, he also released the song "Se Acordo e Tu Não Estás" (If I Wake Up and You're Not There).

He celebrated 15 years of his career in 2003 with a concert at the Pavilhão Atlântico in Lisbon. The concert was recorded on CD and DVD, under the name "15 anos de Canções - Ao Vivo No Pavilhão Atlântico" (15 Years of Songs - Live at the Pavilhão Atlântico), and went quadruple platinum.

In December 2006, the album "A Vida Que Eu Escolhi" (The Life I Chose) was released. This album was a great success, reaching double platinum in pre-sales and later quadruple platinum.

As part of the celebration of his 20-year career, he performed for the public in March 2008, giving two sold-out concerts at the Pavilhão Atlântico on two consecutive days.

Also in 2008, he released a new album, entitled "O Homem Que Sou" (The Man I Am), which would prove to be a success, reaching number one on the Portuguese record sales charts. O Homem Que Sou has been certified seven times platinum in Portugal. Up to 2009, he sold over 700,000 records in Portugal.

In 2010, the album "O Mesmo de Sempre" (The Same as Always) was released. In December 2012, the album "Essencial" (Essential) was launched to celebrate 25 years of his career.

=== In the following years (2011-2016) ===
In February 2014 he released "Nos fiançailles, France/Portugal" (Our Engagement, France/Portugal), exclusively for French-speaking markets, where he sang accompanied by French singers such as Natasha St-Pier, Vincent Niclo, Gérard Lenorman, Michel Sardou, Dany Brillant, Serge Lama, Anggun, Didier Barbelivien, Lisa Angell and Hélène Ségara. After releasing the album "Nos fiançailles, France/Portugal", Carreira started to work on a new album to be released in the French market.

Later that year, on 15 December, he released the album "Sempre" (Always). "Não Te vou mentir" (I Won't Lie to You) appears on the soundtrack of the TVI telenovela "Jardins Proibidos" (Forbidden Gardens).

“Mon Fado” (My Fado) is the album that Carreira recorded and released in 2016. In this album, Carreira collaborates with Serge Lama, Gioacchino, Jacques Veneruso, and also with the celebrated fado author and composer, Jorge Fernando. “Mon Fado” is an album that revisits, in Carreira's voice and with a new arrangement, great hits such as “Canção do Mar” (Song of the Sea), “Casa Portuguesa” (Portuguese House), “Avril au Portugal” (April in Portugal), “Sodade”, among other songs, in addition to including three unreleased tracks. It includes the new song “Para Poder Amar-te” (In Order To Love You).

In 2016, Carreira was awarded the Knight of the Order of Arts and Letters medal by the French government.

=== Plagiarism controversy ===
In August 2008, the Portuguese Society of Authors (SPA) announced that it had received several complaints about possible plagiarism by Tony Carreira. The complaints related to three songs: "Depois de Ti (Mais Nada)", "Ai Destino, Ai Destino" and "Leva-me ao Céu". SPA concluded that the song "Depois de Ti (Mais Nada)", is an apparent unauthorized copy of the song "Después de Ti...¿Qué?", composed by Rudy Pérez and first performed by José Feliciano. No action was taken however because SPA had not received an official complaint from the rights owners, who were represented by Universal Music Publishing. According to Universal Music the matter was "under investigation".

On 13 September 2017, Tony Carreira was accused of plagiarism by the Portuguese Public Prosecution Service, together with composer Ricardo Landum. The two were accused by the Public Prosecutor's Office of plagiarizing 11 songs. After several websites for years exposed various similarities between Carreira's hits and songs by French and South American authors, a complaint led the Public Prosecutor's Office to accuse the singer, along with Landum, of the crimes of usurpation and counterfeiting.

According to news published in various national media outlets, the Public Prosecutor's Office, faced with an accusation in 13 songs and after carrying out an expert analysis of each song, accepted a complaint from the National Music Company (CNM) against Tony Carreira in 11 songs. Based on the accusation formulated by CNM to the Public Prosecutor's Office, some of the main hits of the singer Tony Carreira were allegedly "copied" from hits by other international artists such as Fédéric François, Roch Voisine, Jean-Jacques Goldman, Lara Fabian, David Charvet, Rudy Pérez, Enrique Macias and Pimpinela.

In total, according to the Public Prosecutor's Office, the singer was accused of 11 counts of usurpation and 11 counts of counterfeiting in the following songs:

- "Ai Destino, Ai Destino" (1995): "Zingarella", by Enrico Macias (1988);
- "Sonhos de Menino" (1997): "L'Idiot", by Hervé Vilard (1981);
- "Adeus Até Um Dia" (1996): "Tzigane", by Frédéric François (1993);
- "Depois de ti (Mais Nada)" (1999): "Después de Ti...¿Qué?", by Rudy Pérez (1997);
- "O anjo que eu era" (1998): "Regarde Toi", by David Charvet (1997);
- "Leva-me ao Céu" (1998): "Suddenly You Love Me", by The Tremeloes (1968), the latter being a cover of "Uno tranquillo", by Italian singer Riccardo Del Turco (1967);
- "Por ti" (2000): "Je t'aime", by Lara Fabian (1996);
- "Já que te vais?" (2001): "Puisque tu pars", by Jean-Jacques Goldman (1987);
- "Se acordo e tu não estás" (2002): "Me muero", by Pimpinela (1995);
- "Esta falta de ti" (2004): "Toi qui manques à ma vie", by Natasha St-Pier (2001);
- "Porque é que vens" (2008): "Ne viens pas", by Roch Voisine (2005);

Landum was also named as a defendant in the same case. According to the prosecution's accusation, the defendants "took advantage of the matrix of other people's works, using the same structure, melody, harmony, rhythm and orchestration and, sometimes, the very lyrics of foreign works that they translated, obtaining a work that is nothing more than a partial reproduction of the original.". After the accusation became known, Tony Carreira described the complaint as "unfounded", which does not represent any author or artist involved in the works in question.

In 2018, the singer reached an agreement with the Public Prosecutor's Office, suspending the plagiarism proceedings in court. To this end, Tony Carreira donated €10,000 to the Pampilhosa da Serra Municipal Council and €10,000 to the Association for the Support of Victims of Pedrogão Grande. Ricardo Landum paid €2,000 to a private social solidarity institution of his choice.

=== Recent years ===
Carreira remains very popular in Portugal, and also among Portuguese expatriate communities in France and other countries.

In 2018, he published a book titled "O homem que sou" (The Man I Am).

On 18 February 2023, Tony performed his last live show of the year in France.

On 25 July 2024, he was awarded the rank of Commander of the Order of Prince Henry the Navigator. Later that year, he debuted as a presenter with the program "Tony e Amigos" (Tony and Friends), for V+TVI.

== Personal life ==
The singer was married to Fernanda Antunes from 1985 to 2014, and the relationship produced three children: Mickael Carreira (born in 1986), David Carreira (born in 1991) and Sara Carreira (1999-2020). All three children followed in their father's footsteps as musicians and, in David's case, also pursued careers in fashion and acting. Sara was one of the singers on "Martin et les fées: Un conte féérique en chansons", an album that brings together songs based on the eponymous French tale and also features, among others, Gad Elmaleh, former boyfriend of Princess Charlotte of Monaco.

In August 2014, he separated from his wife, and the divorce was only finalized in 2019, after the division of their €10 million fortune in houses, apartments and luxury cars.

On 5 December 2020, his daughter Sara died in a car accident in Santarém, on the A1 motorway at the age of 21. On 2 May 2021, Mother's Day in Portugal, Tony Carreira officially announced on social media the founding of an association in memory of his daughter, the Sara Carreira Association, with the support of his ex-wife, Fernanda, and their two sons, Mickael and David. The goal is to grant scholarships to underprivileged children so they can pursue their dreams.

== Discography ==
=== Albums ===
Studio albums

- 1991 É Verão Portugal (Discossete)
- 1992 Canta Canta Portugal (Discossete)
- 1993 Português De Alma E Coração (Espacial)
- 1994 Adeus Amigo (Espacial)
- 1995 Ai Destino (Espacial)
- 1996 Adeus Até Um Dia (Espacial)
- 1997 Coração Perdido (Espacial)
- 1998 Sonhador, Sonhador (Espacial)
- 1999 Dois Corações Sozinhos (Espacial)
- 2001 Cantor de Sonhos (Espacial)
- 2002 Passionita Lolita (POMME)
- 2004 Vagabundo Por Amor (Espacial)
- 2006 A Vida Que Eu Escolhi (Espacial)
- 2008 O Homem Que Sou (Farol)
- 2010 O Mesmo de Sempre (Farol)
- 2014 Nos fiançailles France/Portugal (Sony Music Smart)
- 2013 Sempre (Farol)
- 2016 Mon fado (Sony Music Smart)
- 2017 Sempre Mais (Sony Music Portugal)
- 2017 Le Coeur des Femmes (Sony Music France et Smart)
- 2018 As Canções das nossas vidas - acoustic (Sony Music Portugal et Regi-concerto lda)
- 2021 Recomeçar

Compilation albums

- 2008 Best Of 20 Anos de Canções (Espacial)
- 2010 Reste - Best Of
- 2011 Best Of 20 Anos de Canções Vol. 2 (Espacial)
- 2012 Essencial (Farol)

Live albums

- 2000 Ao Vivo No Olympia (Espacial)
- 2003 15 anos de Canções - Ao Vivo No Pavilhão Atlântico (Espacial)
- 2008 Ao Vivo No Coliseu (Espacial)
- 2013 Tony Carreira 25 Anos (Farol)
- 2018 As Canções das nossas vidas - Acústico (Sony Music Portugal et Regi-concerto lda)

==== International charting ====
Year	Title	Peak chart positions			Sales
Year	Title	BEL (Wa)	FR	SWI	Sales
2003	Passionita pila Lolita	—	116	—	
2010	Reste - Best Of	—	122	—	
2014	Nos fiançailles, France / Portugal	27	4	40	FR: 65,000
2016	Mon fado	112	15	93	
2017	Le cœur des femmes	69	18	26	

=== Singles ===
Year	Title	Chart Positions	Album	Year-end positions
Year	Title	POR	Album	Year-end positions
2007	"O Que Vai Ser De Mím (quando Fores Embora)"	2	A Vida Que Eu Escolhi	
2009	"Porque E Que Vens?"	2	O Homem Que Sou	3
2009	"Se Me Vais Deixar"	10	O Homem Que Sou	37
2011	"A Saudade De Ti"	13	O Mesmo De Sempre	
