= Remixes (Cristian Castro album) =

Remix album by Cristian Castro
- Released: May 16, 2000
- Recorded: 1997–2000
- Genre: Latin pop, dance-pop
- Length: 42:37
- Label: BMG

Cristian Castro chronology
Mi Vida Sin Tu Amor (1999)	Remixes (2000)	Azul (2001)

Remixes is a compilation album of remixes by Cristian Castro released in 2000 by BMG.

== Track listing ==
No.	Title	Writer(s)	Length
1.	"Lloran Las Rosas" (Jose Luis Pagan Mix)	Alfredo Matheus	4:50
2.	"Por Amarte Así" (DJ Grego Mix)	Alejandro Montalbán, Eduardo Reyes	4:40
3.	"Alguna Vez" (Travis Cook Mix)	Kike Santander	4:19
4.	"Si Tú Me Amaras" (Hex Hector Mix)	Rudy Pérez	4:16
5.	"Volver a Amar" (DJ Sugar Kid Mix)	Kike Santander	3:57
6.	"Más y Más" (Pumpin' Dolls Mix)	Kike Santander	3:33
7.	"Después de Ti…¿Qué?" (Maurice Santa Cruz Mix)	Rudy Pérez	4:33
8.	"Mi Vida Sin Tu Amor" (Zeffective Mix)	Kike Santander	3:17
9.	"Tu Sombra En Mi" (Travis Cook Mix)	Daniel Bentancourt	4:41
10.	"Lo Mejor de Mí" (DJ Sugar Kid Mix)	Rudy Pérez	4:31

== Charts ==
Chart (2000)	Peak position
U.S. Billboard Top Latin Albums	38
