= Jay Lozada =

American musician and singer

Jay Lozada is a Puerto-Rican American singer and brother of Vico C. In 2001 released his self-titled debut album and was nominated the following year for a Lo Nuestro Award for Tropical New Artist of the Year. The album included a cover version of Cristian Castro's "Por Amarte Así", which peaked at number thirty-five on the Billboard Hot Latin Songs and number two on the Tropical Songs charts respectively.
