= Azul (Cristian Castro album) =

Studio album by Cristian Castro
- Released: June 5, 2001
- Recorded: October 2000 – March 2001
- Studio: Bernie's Studios; Moon Red Music Studios; MT Studios; Ocean VU; Outline Studios, Miami; The Hit Factory, New York
- Genre: Latin pop; Bolero; Latin rock; Soft rock
- Length: 54:43
- Label: BMG U.S. Latin
- Producer: Kike Santander

Cristian Castro chronology
Remixes (2000)	Azul (2001)	Grandes Hits (2002)

Singles from Azul
- 1. "Azul" Released: April 16, 2001; 2. "Yo Quería" Released: August 13, 2001; 3. "Con Ella"; 4. "Lloviendo Estrellas" Released: January 14, 2002

Professional ratings
Review scores
Source	Rating
AllMusic	4/5 stars

Azul (Blue) is the seventh studio album recorded by Mexican singer and songwriter Cristian Castro. It was released by BMG U.S. Latin on June 5, 2001 (see 2001 in music). It was produced again by Colombian songwriter and record producer Kike Santander working last album Cristian's Mi Vida Sin Tu Amor (1999). It was nominated Grammy Award for Best Latin Pop Album in the 44th Annual Grammy Awards on February 27, 2002. The title track, "Azul", topped the Latin charts.

== Track listing ==
No.	Title	Writer(s)	Length
1.	"Yo quería"	Toto Cutugno	4:18
2.	"Nuestro amor"	Kike Santander	3:51
3.	"Lloviendo estrellas"	Alejandro Montalbán · Eduardo Reyes	4:17
4.	"Sólo"	Kike Santander · Gustavo Santander	4:44
5.	"Con ella"	Omar Sánchez · Kike Santander	4:55
6.	"Dos amantes"	Kike Santander	4:58
7.	"Azul"	Kike Santander · Gustavo Santander	4:24
8.	"Gil amori/Los amores"	Toto Cutugno	4:37
9.	"Llorar por dentro"	Arturo Castro	4:27
10.	"Amantes de Ocasión"	Adriana Muñóz	4:45
11.	"Cupido"	Juan Pablo Manzanero · Kike Santander	4:28
12.	"Si pudiera"	José Antonio Molina	5:04
Total length:			54:43

== Charts ==
Chart (2001)	Peak position
Spanish Albums Chart	75
U.S. Billboard 200	193
U.S. Billboard Top Latin Albums	3
U.S. Billboard Latin Pop Albums	7
U.S. Billboard Heatseekers Albums	14

== Sales and certifications ==
Region	Certification	Certified units/sales
Argentina (CAPIF)	Platinum	40,000^{^}
Chile	2× Platinum	40,000
Mexico (AMPROFON)	Platinum	150,000^{^}
Spain (PROMUSICAE)	Platinum	100,000^{^}
United States (RIAA)	2× Platinum (Latin)	200,000^{^}
^{^} Shipments figures based on certification alone.
