= Hoy Quiero Soñar =

Studio album by Cristian Castro
- Released: November 23, 2004
- Recorded: 2004
- Studio: Beach House Recording Studios (Miami Beach, Florida); Cuero Room Studios; DJ Music Productions Studios; L&M Studios; Mas Music Studios; Santander Studios; The Hit Factory Critiera; The Tiki Room Studio (Miami, Florida); The Hit Factory Recording Studios (New York City)
- Genre: Latin pop; bolero; latin ballad
- Length: 48:11
- Label: BMG U.S. Latin
- Producer: Rudy Pérez; Kike Santander; Daniel Betancourt; Milton Salcedo

Cristian Castro chronology
Amar Es (2003)	Hoy Quiero Soñar (2004)	Nunca Voy a Olvidarte...Los Exitos (2005)

Singles from Hoy Quiero Soñar
- 1. "Una Canción Para Tí" Released: September 27, 2004; 2. "Te Buscaría" Released: January 10, 2005; 3. "Quédate En Mis Brazos" Released: February 7, 2005; 4. "Imagina" Released: March 28, 2005; 5. "Qué Me Van A Hablar De Amor" Released: April 11, 2005; 6. "Atrévete" Released: May 16, 2005; 7. "Silencio" Released: June 6, 2005

Hoy Quiero Soñar (English: Today I Want to Dream) is the ninth studio album recorded by Mexican singer-songwriter Cristian Castro, It was released by BMG U.S. Latin on November 23, 2004 (see 2004 in music). It is the last album under the BMG record label. The album was produced by Rudy Pérez and co-produced by Kike Santander, Daniel Betancourt and Milton Salcedo.

== Track listing ==
No.	Title	Writer(s)	Length
1.	"Una Canción Para Tí"	Kike Santander	3:39
2.	"Imagina"	Roberto Livi; Rudy Pérez	4:09
3.	"Tu Vida Con La Mía"	Kike Santander	4:18
4.	"Quédate En Mis Brazos"	Kike Santander	3:56
5.	"Te Buscaría"	Kike Santander	4:13
6.	"Atrévete"	Kike Santander	3:52
7.	"Silencio"	Christian Leuzzi; Kike Santander	4:25
8.	"Mi Castigo, Mi Desgracia"	Kike Santander	4:22
9.	"Qué Me Van A Hablar De Amor"	Roberto Livi; Rudy Pérez	3:32
10.	"Vamos A Bailar"	Cristian Castro; Daniel Betancourt	4:01
11.	"Yo Dudo Que Con Él"	Rudy Pérez	4:18
12.	"Hoy Quiero Soñar"	Kike Santander	4:03
13.	"Mujer de Madera"	Cristian Castro	4:58
Total length:			48:11

== Credits and personnel ==
- Juan E. Aristizabal – Engineer
- Levi Mora Arriaga – Trumpet
- José Luis Arroyave – Engineer
- Andrés Bermúdez – Engineer, Mix Engineer
- Daniel Betancourt – Arranger, composer, Keyboards, Piano, producer, Programming
- Richard Bravo – Percussion
- Cristian Castro – Composer
- Gustavo Celis – Mix Engineer
- Mike Couzzi – Engineer
- Vicky Echeverri – Background Vocals
- Rafael Ferro García – Arranger, String Conductor
- Jose Luis Galvis – Engineer
- Julio Hernández – Electric Bass
- John Kricker – Trombone
- Christian Leuzzi – Composer
- Lee Levin – Drums
- Gary Lindsay – Arranger, String Conductor
- Roberto Livi – Composer
- David Jimenez López – Assistant Engineer
- Manny López – Guitar
- Patrick Magee – Engineer
- Miami Symphonic Strings – Strings
- Boris Milan – Mix Engineer
- Sergio Minski – Production Coordination
- José Antonio Molina – Arranger
- Ricardo Montaner – Vocals
- Teddy Mulet – Trumpet
- Joel Numa – Engineer
- Alfredo Oliva – Concertmaster
- Wendy Pederson – Background Vocals
- Jerry Peel – Horn
- Betsy Pérez – Production Coordination
- Rudy Pérez – Audio Production, composer, engineer, Guitar (Acoustic), Keyboards, Percussion, producer
- Clay Perry – Keyboards, Programming
- Catalina Rodríguez – Background Vocals
- Milton Salcedo – Arranger, Keyboards, Piano, producer, Programming
- Kike Santander – Arranger, Audio Production, composer, Background Vocals, Executive Producer, producer
- Fernando Tobón – Electric Bass, Drums
- Eugenio Vanderhorst – Copyist
- Juan José Virviescas – Engineer
- Dan Warner – Guitar
- Larry Warrilow – Copyist
- Bruce Weeden – Engineer, Mastering, Mezcla

== Charts ==
Chart (2004)	Peak position
Spanish Albums Chart	31
U.S. Billboard Top Latin Albums	13
U.S. Billboard Latin Pop Albums	5
U.S. Billboard Heatseekers Albums	17
