= Si Tú Me Amaras =

1997 single by Cristian Castro

Single by Cristian Castro

from the album Lo Mejor de Mí
- Released: October 20, 1997
- Recorded: 1997
- Genre: Latin pop
- Length: 4:17
- Label: BMG U.S. Latin
- Songwriter: Rudy Pérez
- Producer: Rudy Pérez

Cristian Castro singles chronology
"Lo Mejor de Mí" (1997)	"Si Tú Me Amaras" (1997)	"Lloran Las Rosas" (1997)

Music video
- "Si Tú Me Amaras" on YouTube

Audio sample
- "Si Tu Me Amaras": file; help

"Si Tú Me Amaras" (English: If You Loved Me) is a Latin ballad written by Rudy Pérez and first performed by Chilean singer Luis Jara in 1996. A year later, Mexican singer-songwriter Cristian Castro covered the song, with Perez's involvement with the production and arrangement. It was released by BMG U.S. Latin on October 20, 1997, as the third single from his fifth studio album, Lo Mejor de Mí (1997).

== Promotion ==
A fairy tale-inspired music video, directed by Dudu Scuderi was shot in Villa Vizcaya at Miami, Florida. The video was nominated for Video of the Year at the Lo Nuestro Awards. The song was also remixed by Hex Hector which was included in Castro's album Remixes (2000). The song, along with his music video, were featured in his compilation album Nunca Voy a Olvidarte...Los Exitos (2005).

== Chart performance ==
Chart (1998)	Peak position
U.S. Billboard Hot Latin Tracks	5
U.S. Billboard Latin Pop Airplay	3
Billboard Latin Tropical/Salsa Airplay	8
