= Gustavo Santander =

Colombian composer

- Birth name: Gustavo Adolfo Santander Lora
- Origin: Colombian
- Occupation(s): Composer and producer
- Years active: 2000–present
- Website: Official site in Spanish and English

Gustavo Adolfo Santander Lora is a Colombian composer who has had great success at international level. He has composed over 200 songs for major artists like David Bisbal, Alejandro Fernández, Cristian Castro, Diego Torres, Ricardo Montaner, Sergio Dalma, Luis Fonsi, Rocío Dúrcal, Jerry Rivera and Carlos Santana, among others. He is also the brother of composer and producer Kike Santander.

== Biography ==
He was born in Santiago de Cali, Colombia and he raised in La Flora, a typical upper-middle-class neighborhood of Cali. His father was doctor, poet and guitarist Flavio Santander and his mother is Judith. His brother is composer and producer Kike Santander.

Gustavo Santander began his career as a composer in 2000. He was awarded three times by the American Society of Composers (ASCAP), at the Nokia Theatre Times Square in New York. In 2002 he was awarded for the song "Azul" (in Spanish: Blue), performed by Cristian Castro, in 2004 for the song "Entre el Delirio y la Locura" (Between Delirium and Madness), sung by Jennifer Peña, and in 2007 he received an award Regional Mexican category for the song "Se te olvidó" (you forgot), played by Pablo Montero´s Mexican artist.

To this must be added the 14 certifications Grammy for his participation in successful albums like Corazón Latino and Bulería of David Bisbal, MTV Unplugged and Un Mundo Diferente (A Different World) by Diego Torres, Men of Honor of Grupomania, Caramelito by Rocío Dúrcal" I will fall in love by Gisselle, and A Corazon Abierto by Alejandro Fernández, among others.

In 2007 Gustavo and Kike Santander worked together on Music Group in Miami in important musical projects as BATUKA, an album that combines music and aerobics. This album, released internationally, sold over a million copies in Spain alone. He now lives in Miami.
