= Después de Ti...¿Qué? =

Song written by Rudy Pérez

Single by Pandora

from the album Hace Tres Noches Apenas
- Released: 1997
- Recorded: 1997
- Genre: Regional Mexican, Tejano
- Length: 4:03
- Label: EMI Latin
- Songwriter: Rudy Pérez

Pandora singles chronology
"El Canalla" (1995)	"Después de Ti...¿Qué?" (1997)

"Después de Ti...¿Qué?"

Single by Cristian Castro featuring Raúl di Blasio

from the album Lo Mejor de Mí
- Released: 1998
- Recorded: 1997
- Genre: Latin pop
- Length: 5:31
- Label: Sony BMG
- Songwriter: Rudy Pérez
- Producer: Rudy Pérez

Cristian Castro singles chronology
"Lloran Las Rosas" (1998)	"Después de Ti...¿Qué?" (1998)	"Escondidos" (1999)

Music video
- "Después de Ti...¿Qué?" on YouTube

Audio sample
- "Después de Ti...¿Qué?": file; help

"Después de Ti...¿Qué?" (English: After You…What?) is a song written by Rudy Pérez and first recorded by Puerto Rican singer José Feliciano in his album Ya Soy Tuyo (1985). In 1997, Mexican female trio Pandora covered the songs on their live album Hace Tres Noches Apenas. This version peaked at #30 on the Hot Latin Songs chart and #13 on the Latin Pop Airplay chart. In the same year, Cristian Castro covered the song on his fifth album, Lo Mejor de Mi, with Raúl di Blasio as the pianist. It was released in 1998 as the fourth and last single. In 2006, Feliciano and Castro recorded the song as a duet on Feliciano's collaboration album José Feliciano y Amigos.

== Chart performance (Pandora version) ==
Chart (1997)	Peak position
Billboard Hot Latin Tracks	30
Billboard Latin Pop Airplay	13

== Chart performance (Cristian Castro version) ==
Chart (1999)	Peak position
Billboard Hot Latin Tracks	24
Billboard Latin Pop Airplay	7

== Music video (Cristian Castro version) ==
A music video featuring Raúl Di Blasio was shot.
