= Días Felices =

Dias Felices

Studio album by Cristian Castro
- Released: November 15, 2005
- Genre: Latin pop, Latin rock, pop rock
- Length: 36:56
- Label: Universal Latino

Cristian Castro chronology
Nunca Voy a Olvidarte...Los Exitos (2005)	Dias Felices (2005)	El Indomable (2007)

Singles from Días Felices
- 1. "Amor Eterno" Released: September 19, 2005; 2. "Sin Tu Amor" Released: February 13, 2006

Professional ratings
Review scores
Source	Rating
Allmusic	3/5 stars

Dias Felices (Happy Days) is the tenth studio album by Cristian Castro. It was released in 2005. Both the album and the song, Amor Eterno, were nominated for Pop Album of the Year and Pop Song of the Year in the Premios Lo Nuestro Awards of 2007.

== Track listing ==
1. Sin Tu Amor
2. Si Ya No Estas Aquí
3. Viajando en el Tiempo
4. Simone
5. Dinamita
6. Amor Total
7. Descontrol
8. Amor Eterno
9. Abarazado a Tu Piel
10. Dias Felices

== Charts ==
Chart (2005)	Peak position
Spanish Albums Chart	36
U.S. Billboard Top Latin Albums	16
U.S. Billboard Latin Pop Albums	7
U.S. Billboard Heatseekers Albums	16

== Sales and certifications ==
Region	Certification	Certified units/sales
Mexico (AMPROFON)	Gold	50,000^{^}
United States (RIAA)	Platinum (Latin)	100,000^{^}
^{^} Shipments figures based on certification alone.
