= Por Amarte Así (song) =

2000 single by Cristian Castro

Single by Cristian Castro

from the album Mi Vida Sin Tu Amor
- Released: 2000
- Recorded: 1999
- Genre: Latin pop
- Length: 4:32
- Label: BMG U.S. Latin
- Songwriters: Alejandro Montalbán, Eduardo Reyes
- Producer: Kike Santander

Cristian Castro singles chronology
"Volver a Amar" (2000)	"Por Amarte Así" (2000)	"Azul" (2001)

Audio sample
- A 27 second sample of "Por Amarte Así" by Cristian Castro.: file; help

"Por Amarte Así" (English: "Loving You This Way") is a song written by Alejandro Montalbán and Eduardo Reyes and performed by Mexican recording artist Cristian Castro. It was produced by Kike Santander and released in 2000 as the fourth single from his sixth studio album Mi Vida Sin Tu Amor (1999). Lyrically, the song is about a man who promises to keep loving his lover even though she is gone. In the United States, it peaked at number three and two on the Billboard Hot Latin Songs and Latin Pop Songs charts and received a Billboard Latin Music nomination for Pop Track of the Year. "Por Amarte Así" was the fifth best-performing Latin single of 2001 in the United States.

The song has been recorded by several artists including Jay Lozada, Xandro y Su Punto, Alacranes Musical, and Ana Isabelle. Lozada recorded the song in salsa for his eponymous debut album which peaked at number two on the Billboard Tropical Songs chart. Alacranes Musical's version peaked at number two on the Billboard Hot Latin Songs as well as number one on the Billboard Regional Mexican Songs and was nominated a Billboard Latin Music Award for Regional Mexican Airplay of the Year by a Male Group. Isabelle's cover features Castro as a duet artist which was well received by music critics and peaked at number 14 on the Hot Latin Songs chart. Montalbán and Reyes received three American Society of Composers, Authors and Publishers Latin Awards for Castro, Lozada, and Alacranes Musical's recording of "Por Amarte Así".

== Background ==
"Por Amarte Así" is a song written by Alejandro Montalbán and Eduardo Reyes and performed by Mexican recording artist Cristian Castro for his sixth studio album Mi Vida Sin Tu Amor (1999). Produced by Colombian musician Kike Santander, it was released as the fourth and final single from the album. In the song, the protagonist tells his lover he will keep loving her no matter how long she has been gone. "Por Amarte Así" has been included on his greatest albums Grandes Hits (2002) and Nunca Voy a Olvidarte...Los Exitos (2005). In addition, a remixed version by DJ Greco was included on Castro's album Remixes (2000). In 2012, Castro recorded a live version of "Por Amarte Así" with new arrangements by Matt Rolling and produced Aureo Baqueiro. This version was included on his second live album En Primera Fila: Día 2 in 2014.

== Reception ==
In the United States, "Por Amarte Así" debuted at number 34 at the Billboard Hot Latin Songs chart on the week of 5 August 2000. It climbed on the top ten six weeks later and peaked at number three on the week of 11 November 2000 In the same week, the song peaked at number two on the Billboard Latin Pop Songs chart with the number one position held off by Chayanne's song "Yo Te Amo". "Por Amarte Así" ended 2001 as the fifth best-performing Latin single of the year in the United States as well as the second best-performing Latin pop single in the country after "Abrázame Muy Fuerte" by Juan Gabriel.

At the 2001 Billboard Latin Music Awards, "Por Amarte Así" was nominated Pop Track of the Year but lost to "A Puro Dolor" by Son by Four. Montalbán and Reyes received an American Society of Composers, Authors and Publishers (ASCAP) Latin Award on the Pop/Ballad category for their compositions of the song. It was recognized by the Nielsen Broadcast Data Systems at the June 2003 SPIN Awards for playing over 50,000 spins.

== Charts ==
=== Weekly charts ===
Chart (2000)	Peak position
Chile (EFE)	3
Honduras (EFE)	8
Nicaragua (EFE)	1
US Hot Latin Songs (Billboard)	3
US Latin Pop Airplay (Billboard)	2

=== Year-end charts ===
Chart (2000)	Position
US Latin Songs (Billboard)	30

Chart (2001)	Position
US Latin Songs (Billboard)	5
US Latin Pop Songs (Billboard)	2

=== All-time charts ===
Chart (2021)	Position
US Hot Latin Songs (Billboard)	41

== Ana Isabelle version ==
"Por Amarte Así"

Single by Ana Isabelle featuring Cristian Castro

from the album Mi Sueño
- Released: 29 November 2009
- Recorded: 2009
- Genre: Latin pop
- Length: 4:13
- Label: Universal Music Latino
- Songwriters: Alejandro Montalbán, Eduardo Reyes

Ana Isabelle singles chronology
"Se Acabo" (2009)	"Por Amarte Así" (2009)	"La Vida es Bella" (2011)

Cristian Castro singles chronology
"El Culpable Soy Yo" (2009)	"Por Amarte Así" (2009)	"La Nave del Olvido" (2010)

In 2009, Puerto Rican singer Ana Isabelle covered "Por Amarte Así" on her second studio album, Mi Sueño (2010). It was released on 29 November 2009 after she won the reality show ¡Viva el Sueño!. Isabelle's version features Cristian Castro as a duet. Isabelle's version peaked at number fourteen and six on the Billboard Hot Latin Songs and Latin Pop Songs charts respectively. On the review of the album, David Jeffries of Allmusic said that Isabelle performed "Por Amarte Así" "convincingly". Ayala Ben-Yehuda of Billboard magazine called her rendition of the song a "well-chosen ballad single".

A music video for the song was filmed in Miami and directed by Pablo Croce which features Isabelle and Castro performing inside a building where the two attempt to visit each other's room. Isabelle also recorded "Por Amarte Así" in bachata which features American group 24 Horas as well as an urban remix featuring J-King and Maximan. Isabelle and Castro performed the song live during the 22nd Annual Lo Nuestro Award ceremony in 2010 after the latter sang "Ten Valor".

=== Charts ===
==== Weekly charts ====
Chart (2010)	Peak position
US Hot Latin Songs (Billboard)	14
US Latin Pop Airplay (Billboard)	6

== Other cover versions ==
In 2000, Puerto Rican musician Jay Lozada recorded a cover of "Por Amarte Así" in salsa for his eponymous debut album which was produced by Eddy Marrero. His version peaked at number thirty-five on the Billboard Hot Latin Songs and number two on the Tropical Songs charts respectively. A music video for his rendition was filmed which shows scenes of Lozada and woman in various parts of Miami. The success of Lozada's cover led to him receiving a nomination for Tropical New Artist at the 14th Annual Lo Nuestro Award ceremony in 2002 but lost to Huey Dunbar. Montalbán and Reyes were awarded an ASCAP Latin music award on the Salsa category for Lozada's cover in 2002. In 2001, Dominican music group Xandro y Su Punto covered the song in merengue for their second studio album Exclusivo (2001). Their version peaked at number 35 on the Tropical Songs chart. In the same year, the song had a version titled "Por Te Amar Assim", performed by the brazilian sertanejo duo Marlon & Maicon for the first album.

Six years later, American duranguense band Alacranes Musical recorded a rendition of "Por Amarte Así" on their studio album Ahora y Siempre (2007). Their cover peaked at number two at the Hot Latin Songs chart and became their first number-one song on the Billboard Regional Mexican Songs chart. An editor for Allmusic described as one of that songs in the album "the group's festive sound is showcased on fast-paced songs of romance". The music video shows the group performing at a stage with various scenes involving a woman shot in gray scale until the end of the video. It received a nomination for Regional Mexican Airplay of the Year by a Male Group at the 2008 Billboard Latin Music Awards which went to La Arrolladora Banda El Limón for their song "De Ti Exclusivo". Montalbán and Reyes won an ASCAP Latin Music Award on the Regional Mexican field for Alacranes Musical's version. It was included on their greatest hits album La Historia de Los Exitos (2009) and Por Siempre Alacranes (2010). A live version of the song was recorded on their album Live – En Vivo Desde Mexico (2009).

In 2020, Latin American boyband CNCO recorded their version of "Por Amarte Así", as part of their 2021 cover album Déjà Vu.

== See also ==
- Billboard Top Latin Songs Year-End Chart
