= Azul (song) =

Song by Cristian Castro

Single by Cristian Castro

from the album Azul
- Released: 3 May 2001
- Genre: Pop rock
- Length: 4:24
- Label: BMG US Latin
- Songwriters: Kike Santander; Gustavo Santander
- Producers: Kike Santander; Andrés Munera; Fernando "Toby" Tobón

Cristian Castro singles chronology
"Por Amarte Así" (2000)	"Azul" (2001)	"Yo Quería" (2001)

Music video
- "Azul" on YouTube

"Azul" (transl. "Blue") is a song by the Mexican singer Cristian Castro from his seventh studio album of the same name (2001). The song was co-written by brothers Kike and Gustavo Santander and produced by Kike, Andrés Munera, Fernando "Toby" Tobón. It is a pop rock power ballad in which the singer likens love to the color blue. The track was released on as the lead single from the album by BMG US Latin on 3 May 2001. A music video for "Azul" was directed by Pedro Torres and features Castro in a beach, house, and a nightclub with friends and premiered on 6 June 2001.

The song received positive reactions from music critics who found it to be catchy. It was nominated in the category of Pop Song of the Year at the 2002 Lo Nuestro Awards and Latin Pop Airplay of the Year at the 2002 Latin Billboard Music Awards, while Kike Santander was the recipient of the Broadcast Music, Inc. (BMI) Latin Award in the same year. Commercially, it topped the Billboard Hot Latin Songs, Latin Pop Airplay, and Tropical Airplay charts in the United States.

== Background and composition ==
In 1999, Cristian Castro released his sixth studio album, Mi Vida Sin Tu Amor, which was produced by the Colombian musician Kike Santander. Although the album was met with mixed reviews, it achieved multi-platinum status and Castro was named Latin pop artist of 2000 in the US by Billboard. On 15 October 2000, Castro announced that he was working on two albums, one with rock songs and experimental music and an English-language disc of cover ballads. He also announced the titled of the former album as "Azul" as well as the lead single of the same name. Santander worked with Castro again to produce the album.

"Azul" is a pop rock power ballad reminiscent of 1980s music. The San Antonio Express-News editor Ramiro Burr compared the track to Castro's 1992 song "No Podrás" with its "driving percussions and searing guitar lines". It was written by Santander and his brother Gustavo, and produced by Kike, Andrés Munera, and Fernando "Toby" Tobón. In the song, Castro sings: "Azul, y es que este amor es azul como el mar. Azul, como de tu mirada nació mi ilusión. Azul como una lagrima cuando hay perdón" ("Blue, and this love is blue like the sea. Blue, like my illusion was born from your look. Blue like a tear when there is forgiveness").

== Promotion and reception ==
"Azul" was released as the album's lead single on 3 May 2001 by BMG US Latin. BMG also released a remix disc containing a dance and merengue versions of the track on 20 August 2001. A music video was filmed at South Beach, Florida and directed by Pedro Torres. It features scenes of Castro at a beach with friends, at a house, and at a nightclub. The visual was released on 6 June 2001 and took over 30 hours of filming. AllMusic critic John Bush called "Azul" a "downright catchy hit single". In spite of giving the album a negative review, Jordan Levin of the Miami Herald found it to be a "reasonably catchy pop-rocker". Billboard editor Leila Cobo also regarded the track as a "catchy, exuberant slice of '80s-etched rock". Billboard ranked the track number 23 on their list of the 50 best Latin pop songs between 2000 and 2023.

At the 2002 Latin Billboard Music Awards, "Azul" was nominated Latin Pop Airplay of the Year, but lost to "Abrázame Muy Fuerte" by Juan Gabriel. In the same year, it was nominated for Pop Song of the Year at Lo Nuestro Awards, but also lost to the same song. The track was recognized as one of the award-winning songs at the 2002 BMI Latin Awards. Commercially, "Azul" topped the Billboard Hot Latin Songs chart for nine weeks and was ranked the second best-performing track of 2001 on the chart. It also reached the top of the Latin Pop Airplay and Tropical Airplay subcharts, spending 12 weeks on the former and four weeks on the latter.

== Track listing ==
Single

1. Personal Greeting
2. "Azul" (album version) - 4:24
3. Screensaver

Remixes

1. "Azul" (album version) - 4:24
2. "Azul" (dance remix) - 4:32
3. "Azul" (merengue version) - 4:14
4. "Azul" (merengue version with guitar intro) - 4:20

== Charts ==
=== Weekly charts ===
Chart performance for "Azul"
Chart (2001)	Peak position
US Hot Latin Songs (Billboard)	1
US Latin Pop Airplay (Billboard)	1
US Tropical Airplay (Billboard)	1

=== Year-end charts ===
2001 year-end chart performance for "Azul"
Chart (2001)	Position
US Hot Latin Songs (Billboard)	2
US Latin Pop Airplay (Billboard)	4
US Tropical Airplay (Billboard)	12

=== Decade-end charts ===
2000s decade-end chart performance for "Azul"
Chart (2000–2009)	Position
US Hot Latin Songs (Billboard)	75
US Latin Pop Airplay (Billboard)	42

== See also ==
- List of number-one Billboard Hot Latin Tracks of 2001
- List of Billboard Latin Pop Airplay number ones of 2001
- List of Billboard Tropical Airplay number ones of 2001
