= Amar Es =

Studio album by Cristian
- Released: September 30, 2003
- Recorded: February – June 2003
- Studio: Crescent Moon Studios; Gallery Recording Studios; North Bay Recording Studios; The Hit Factory Critiera (Miami, Florida, USA); Home Studio (Asunción, Paraguay); IDA Studio (Mexico City, Mexico)
- Genre: Latin pop; latin rock; bolero; pop rock; latin ballad
- Length: 56:02
- Label: BMG U.S. Latin
- Producer: Emilio Estefan, Jr. · Randall M. Barlow · Federico Ehrlich · Roberto Livi · Rudy Pérez

Cristian chronology
Grandes Hits (2002)	Amar Es (2003)	Hoy Quiero Soñar (2004)

Singles from Amar Es
- 1. "No Hace Falta" Released: August 4, 2003; 2. "Te Llamé" Released: November 3, 2003; 3. "Si Yo Fuera Él" Released: January 5, 2004; 4. "Sólo Pienso En Tí" Released: March 1, 2004; 5. "Madrigal" Released: May 3, 2004; 6. "Oración Caribe" Released: June 28, 2004

Amar Es (English: To Love Is) is the eighth studio album recorded by Mexican singer-songwriter Cristian Castro. It was released by BMG U.S. Latin on September 30, 2003 (see 2003 in music). This album was produced by Emilio Estefan Jr., co-produced by Randall M. Barlow, Federico Ehrlich, Roberto Livi and Rudy Pérez. Amar Es, which translates to English as "To Love Is", is notable for its eclectic use of languages and musical styles. The song "Why", for example, is in English, whilst the lead single "No Hace Falta" combines Japanese and Latin pop. On the other hand, tracks such as the successful single "Te Llamé" hold fast to Castro's Latin-pop roots.

== Track listing ==
No.	Title	Writer(s)	Length
1.	"Este Loco Que Te Mira"	Gian Marco	5:06
2.	"Si Yo Fuera Él"	Alejandro Montalbán	4:51
3.	"Why"	Bill Compton; Tony Sheridan; Diane Warren	4:02
4.	"Sólo Pienso En Tí"	Cristian Castro; Juan Pablo Manzanero	4:18
5.	"Gallito Feliz" (Rock Version)	Demetrio Vite Hernández	3:15
6.	"No Hace Falta"	Emilio Estefan, Jr.; Nicolás Tovar; Randall M. Barlow	4:47
7.	"Oración Caribe"	María Teresa Lara	2:39
8.	"Madrigal"	Felipe Rosario Goyco	2:55
9.	"Entre Los Andes"	Cristian Castro	7:12
10.	"Te Llamé"	Roberto Livi; Rudy Pérez	3:44
11.	"Mujer de Dos Caras"	Gian Marco	4:18
12.	"Saúdade"	Mario Palmeiro	5:20
13.	"Gallito Feliz" (Cumbia Version)	Demetrio Vite Hernández	3:35
14.	"Te Llamé" (Bachata Version)	Roberto Livi; Rudy Pérez	3:18
15.	"Te Llamé" (Cumbia Version)	Roberto Livi; Rudy Pérez	4:54
Total length:			56:02

== Credits and personnel ==
- Pedro Alfonso – Violin
- Tommy Anthony – Vocals (Background)
- Área 305 – Vocals (Background)
- Hiram Arencibia – Trombone
- Antonio Baglio – Mastering
- Randall M. Barlow – Composer, producer, Programming
- Cancio Barretto – Requinto
- Juan Ángel Barretto – Engineer
- Kurt Berge – Technical Support
- Richard Bravo – Percussion
- Olbin Burgos – Drums
- Scott Canto – Engineer
- Jorge Casas – Bass
- Cristian Castro – Composer
- Bill Compton – Composer
- Mike Couzzi – Engineer
- Sal Cueva – Bass
- Kevin Dillon – Production Coordination
- Valério Do Carmo – Graphic Design
- Vicky Echeverri – Vocals (Background)
- Federico Ehrlich – Producer
- Fabi Espino – Trumpet
- Emilio Estefan, Jr. – Composer, producer, Video Director
- Daniela Federici – Photography
- Alfredo Galán – Trumpet
- Javier Garza – Mixing Engineer
- Jessica González – A&R
- Courtney Goodwin – Photography
- Julio Hernández – Bass
- David Heuer – Assistant Engineer
- Carlos Infante – Piano
- María Teresa Lara – Composer
- Leyla Leeming – Production Coordination
- Lee Levin – Drums
- Gary Lindsay – Arranger
- Roberto Livi – Composer, producer
- David López – Assistant Engineer
- Manny López – Guitar, Guitar (Acoustic)
- José Juan Maldonado – Production Coordination
- Juan Pablo Manzanero – Composer
- Gian Marco – Composer
- Steve Menezes – Coordination
- Miami Symphonic Strings – Strings
- Víctor Miller – Trumpet
- Alejandro Montalbán – Composer
- Rickie Muñóz – Trombone
- Joel Numa – Engineer, Mixing Engineer
- Marco Olan – Bass
- Clay Ostwald – Organ, Piano
- Mario Patiño – Creative Director, Text
- Andy Pechenik – Technical Support
- Archie Peña – Percussion
- Fernando Perdomo – Guitar (Electric), Theremin
- Betsy Pérez – Project Coordinator
- Rudy Pérez – Arranger, composer, director, producer, Vocals (Background)
- Clay Perry – Keyboards, Programming
- Freddy Piñero Jr. – Engineer
- Daniel Ponce – Assistant Engineer
- Adrián Possé – A&R
- Óscar G. Regueira – Engineer
- Juan Rosario – Assistant Engineer
- Tony Sheridan – Composer
- Joel Someillán – Engineer
- Todd Sontag – Editing
- Raúl Soto – Percussion
- Ron Taylor – Organ
- Ken Theis – Assistant Engineer
- Lorenzo Torrez – Accordion
- Nicolás Tovar – Composer, Vocal Producer
- William Valdéz – Percussion
- Dan Warner – Guitar
- Ginny Warner – Video Producer
- Diane Warren – Composer
- Bruce Weeden – Engineer
- Ryan Wolff – Assistant Engineer

© MMIII. BMG Music.

== Charts ==
Chart (2003)	Peak position
Spanish Albums Chart	75
U.S. Billboard 200	167
U.S. Billboard Top Latin Albums	3
U.S. Billboard Latin Pop Albums	7
U.S. Billboard Heatseekers Albums	4

== Sales and certifications ==
Region	Certification	Certified units/sales
Argentina (CAPIF)	Gold	20,000^{^}
Mexico (AMPROFON)	Platinum	100,000^{^}
^{^} Shipments figures based on certification alone.
