= Lo Mejor de Mí (song) =

"Lo Mejor de Mi"

Single by Cristian Castro

from the album Lo Mejor de Mí
- Released: 25 August 1997
- Recorded: 1997
- Genre: Latin pop, Bolero
- Length: 3:54
- Label: BMG U.S. Latin
- Songwriter: Rudy Pérez
- Producer: Rudy Pérez

Cristian Castro singles chronology
"Una y Mil Veces" (1997)	"Lo Mejor de Mi" (1997)	"Si Tú Me Amaras" (1997)

Music video
- "Lo Mejor de Mí" on YouTube

Audio sample
- A 23 second sample of Cristian Castro's cover of "Lo Mejor de Mí".: file; help

"Lo Mejor de Mí" ("All My Best") is a song written and produced by Rudy Pérez and first recorded by Spanish singer Juan Ramon for his second studio album Por Haberte Amado Tanto (1990). In the song, the protagonist tells his lover how he gave his best despite not meeting his lover's expectation. In 1997, Mexican recording artist Cristian Castro covered the song for his fifth studio album Lo Mejor de Mí which Pérez also produced and arranged. Castro's version peaked at number-one on the Billboard Hot Latin Songs and the Billboard Latin Pop Songs charts in the United States. The song received a Billboard Latin Music Awards and a Lo Nuestro nomination for Pop Song of the Year. Pérez earned the American Society of Composers, Authors and Publishers award in the Pop/Ballad field.

== Background ==
In 1990, Spanish recording artist Juan Ramon released his second studio album Por Haberte Amado Tanto which was arranged and produced by Cuban-American musician Rudy Pérez for the telenovela Kassandra. Pérez composed three songs for the album including the track "Lo Mejor de Mí". The song speaks of a failed relationship between the protagonist and the lover where the protagonist gave the best they could despite not meeting the lover's expectation. One year later, Argentine musician María Martha Serra Lima covered the song on her studio album of the same name which was also arranged and produced by Pérez. Pérez also proposed the song to be covered by Mexican singer Luis Miguel for his album Segundo Romance (1994). However Miguel decided against recording it as he felt the song would work better as a ballad rather than as a bolero.

In 1997, Mexican recording artist Cristian Castro covered the song for his Grammy-nominated album of the same name with Pérez's involvement with the production and arrangement. It was released as the lead single from the album and the first single under his new record label BMG U.S. Latin following his departure from Fonovisa Records a year earlier. The song is performed in the bolero style.

== Promotion ==
Castro performed the song live in Mexico City, Mexico on 28 October 1997 as part of the promotion for the album. In addition, a music video was released 1998 which was directed by Willie Souza and was filmed in a near Cuernavaca. The song was remixed by DJ Sugar Kid which was included in Castro's album Remixes (2000). It also has been featured in his compilations album Grandes Hits (2002) and Nunca Voy a Olvidarte...Los Exitos (2005).

== Reception ==
"Lo Mejor de Mi" was released as the album's lead single on 25 August 1997. "Lo Mejor de Mí" debuted on the Billboard Hot Latin Songs chart at number 24 in the week of 13 September 1997, climbing to the top ten one week later. The song peaked atop the chart in the week of 22 November 1997 succeeding "Si Tú Supieras" by Alejandro Fernández and was replaced by "Y Hubo Alguien" by Marc Anthony a week later. On the Billboard Latin Pop Songs chart, the song debuted at number ten on the chart. It reached number one on the chart on the week of 4 October 1997 where it spent a total of five nonconsecutive weeks on top. It was second best-performing Latin pop song of 1998 after "Vuelve" by Ricky Martin.

On the review of the album, an editor for Billboard felt that the song "highlights the much-anticipated label by this Mexican singing star". "Lo Mejor de Mí" was awarded Pop Song of the Year at the 1998 Billboard Latin Music Awards and was nominated at the same category the following year. It was also nominated Pop Song of the Year at the 9th Lo Nuestro Awards but lost to "Si Tú Supieras" by Alejandro Fernández. Pérez earned the American Society of Composers, Authors and Publishers award for Pop/Ballad Song of 1998 for the song and was awarded 1999 in the same category.

== Charts ==
=== Weekly charts ===
Chart (1997)	Peak position
US Latin Songs (Billboard)	1
US Latin Pop Songs (Billboard)	1

=== Year-end charts ===
Chart (1997)	Position
US Latin Songs (Billboard)	17
US Latin Pop Songs (Billboard)	7

Chart (1998)	Position
US Latin Songs (Billboard)	16
US Latin Pop Songs (Billboard)	2

== See also ==
- List of number-one Billboard Hot Latin Tracks of 1997
- List of Billboard Latin Pop Airplay number ones of 1997
