= Lo Mejor de Mí =

1997 studio album by Cristian

Studio album by Cristian
- Released: September 30, 1997
- Recorded: December 1996 – August 1997
- Studio: Record Plant Studios; Conway Recording Studios; Westlake Studio (Hollywood); On The Mark Studio (Los Angeles); Circle House Recording Studios; Critiera Recording Studios (Miami); Bullseye Recording Studio (Miami Beach)
- Genre: Latin pop; bolero; Latin ballad
- Length: 55:14
- Language: Spanish
- Label: BMG U.S. Latin
- Producer: Rudy Pérez

Cristian chronology
El Deseo de Oír Tu Voz (1996)	Lo Mejor de Mí (1997)	Mi Vida Sin Tu Amor (1999)

Singles from Lo Mejor de Mí
- 1. "Lo Mejor de Mí" Released: August 4, 1997; 2. "Si Tú Me Amaras" Released: December 1, 1997; 3. "Lloran Las Rosas" Released: February 23, 1998; 4. "Amaneciendo En Tí" Released: May 18, 1998; 5. "Después de Ti... ¿Qué?" Released: September 14, 1998

Professional ratings
Review scores
Source	Rating
Allmusic	4/5 stars

Lo Mejor de Mí is the fifth studio album recorded by Mexican singer-songwriter Cristian Castro, credited for this recording simply as "Cristian." It was released by BMG U.S. Latin on September 30, 1997 (see 1997 in music). The first album from under record label. The album was produced by Rudy Pérez.

This album received nomination for Grammy Award for Best Latin Pop Album at the 40th Annual Grammy Awards, hold on Wednesday, February 25, 1998, losing to Romances by Luis Miguel. The title track was included in the 1998 compilation recording Billboard Latin Music Awards Superstar Hits and reached #1 on Hot Latin Tracks of 1997. The album also was nominated for Pop Recording of the Year at the 10th Lo Nuestro Awards, losing to Me Estoy Enamorando by Alejandro Fernández.

== Track listing ==
No.	Title	Writer(s)	Producer (es)	Length
1.	"Lo Mejor de Mí"	Rudy Pérez	Rudy Pérez	3:56
2.	"Sé Mi Aire"	Fernando Osorio	Rudy Pérez	3:59
3.	"Nadie"	Cristian Castro; Eros Ramazzotti	Rudy Pérez	3:31
4.	"Si Tú Me Amaras"	Rudy Pérez	Rudy Pérez	4:17
5.	"Lloraré"	Fernando Osorio	Rudy Pérez	3:36
6.	"Amaneciendo En Ti"	Alfredo Matheus	Rudy Pérez	4:04
7.	"Me Tomas, Me Sueltas"	Claudia Brant; Dany Tomás; Macelo Wengrovski	Rudy Pérez	4:24
8.	"Necesitas Amor" (Bisogno D'Amore)	Danilo Amerio; Adapt: Spanish: Cristian	Rudy Pérez	4:07
9.	"Seré Para Ti"	Mark Portmann; Rudy Pérez	Rudy Pérez	5:42
10.	"Si Acaba Bien"	Mario Patiño; Rudy Pérez	Rudy Pérez	3:39
11.	"En Dónde Estás Tú"	Mauricio Abaroa	Rudy Pérez	4:40
12.	"Lloran Las Rosas"	Alfredo Matheus	Rudy Pérez	4:27
13.	"Después De Ti...¿Qué?" (with Raúl Di Blasio)	Rudy Pérez	Rudy Pérez	5:30
Total length:				55:14

== Charts ==
Chart (1997)	Peak position
Argentine Albums Chart	1
U.S. Billboard Top Latin Albums	5
U.S. Billboard Latin Pop Albums	4
U.S. Billboard Heatseekers Albums	20

== Sales and certifications ==
Region	Certification	Certified units/sales
Mexico (AMPROFON)	2× Gold	200,000^{^}
United States (RIAA)	2× Platinum (Latin)	200,000^{^}
^{^} Shipments figures based on certification alone.
