= Agua Nueva =

Studio album by Cristian
- Released: June 30, 1992
- Recorded: 1991–92
- Studio: Signature Sound Studios, San Diego, CA
- Genre: Latin pop, latin ballad, pop rock, latin rock, hard rock
- Label: Fonovisa, Universal Music Latino (1998 re-release)
- Producer: Kiko Cibrian, Alejandro Zepeda

Cristian chronology
Kristian y sus Pollitas (1982)	Agua Nueva (1992)	Un Segundo en el Tiempo (1993)

Singles from Agua Nueva
- 1. "No Podrás" Released: May 1992; 2. "Agua Nueva" Released: August 1992; 3. "Diez Mil Lágrimas" Released: October 1992; 4. "Solo Dame Una Noche" Released: January 1993; 5. "Para Tí" Released: April 1993

Agua Nueva (Spanish for "New Water") is the debut album by Mexican pop singer, Cristian Castro. It was released on June 30, 1992. It was nominated for Grammy Award for Best Latin Pop Album in 1993.

Following Fonovisa's purchase by the Universal Music Group, the album was re-released in 1998 with a different track listing.

== Track listing ==
No.	Title	Length
1.	"Sólo dame una noche"	4:52
2.	"Siempre estarás conmigo"	3:48
3.	"Junto a ti"	4:44
4.	"Será el amor"	3:35
5.	"Agua nueva"	3:57
6.	"Diez mil lágrimas"	3:55
7.	"No podrás"	4:02
8.	"Ritual"	4:09
9.	"Señora, por favor…"	3:47
10.	"Prográmame en tu mente"	3:40
11.	"Para ti"	7:38

== Chart position ==
Year	Chart	Peak
1992	Billboard Latin Pop Albums	2
1993	Billboard Top Latin Albums	48

== Sales and certifications ==
Region	Certification	Certified units/sales
Mexico (AMPROFON)	2× Platinum	700,000
