= Un Segundo en el Tiempo =

Studio album by Cristian
- Released: July 20, 1993
- Recorded: 1992–93 (Mexico City, Mexico)
- Genres: Latin pop, latin ballad, pop rock, latin rock, hard rock
- Length: 46:38
- Label: Fonovisa

Cristian chronology
Agua Nueva (1992)	Un Segundo en el Tiempo (1993)	El Camino del Alma (1994)

Singles from Un Segundo en el Tiempo
- 1. "Es Mejor Así" Released: May 3, 1993; 2. "Nunca Voy a Olvidarte" Released: July 5, 1993; 3. "Por Amor a Tí" Released: November 8, 1993

Un Segundo en el Tiempo (English: A second in time) is the second studio album by Mexican Cristian Castro, it was released on July 20, 1993. The album itself did not chart on the Billboard, however, the track, Nunca Voy a Olvidarte, reached #1 on Hot Latin Tracks of 1993.

== Track listing ==
1. "Nunca Voy a Olvidarte" - 5:02
2. "Mujer Especial" ("Color Blind") - 4:30
3. "Por Amor a Tí" - 3:50
4. "Es mejor Así" - 4:00
5. "Soy" - 3:48
6. "Lo Voy a Intentar" - 4:00
7. "Nunca Jamás" - 4:30
8. "Puerto Rico" - 4:13
9. "Canta una Canción de Amor" - 4:10
10. "Fuiste Mia" - 4:20
11. "Un Segundo en el Tiempo" - 4:45

== Argentina Edition ==
1. "Es mejor Así" - 4:00
2. "Por amor a Ti" - 3:50
3. "Mujer Especial" ["Color Blind"] - 4:30
4. "Un Segundo en el Tiempo" - 4:45
5. "Lo voy a Intentar" ["Dejame Intentar"] - 4:00
6. "Nunca voy a Olvidarte" - 5:02
7. "Soy" 3:48
8. "Fuiste Mia" - 4:20
9. "Nunca Jamás" - 4:30
10. "Canta una Canción de Amor" - 4:10
11. "Puerto Rico" - 4:13

== International Edition ==
1. "Por amor a Ti" - 3:50
2. "Es mejor Así" - 4:00
3. "Soy" - 3:48
4. "Lo voy a Intentar" ["Dejame Intentar"] - 4:00
5. "Puerto Rico" - 4:13
6. "Canta una Canción de Amor" - 4:10
7. "Nunca voy a Olvidarte" - 5:02
8. "Mujer Especial" ["Color Blind"] - 4:30
9. "Fuiste Mia" - 4:20
10. "Un Segundo en el Tiempo" - 4:45
11. "Nunca Jamás" - 4:30
