= Lloran Las Rosas =

Single by Cristian

from the album Lo Mejor de Mí
- Released: November 3, 1997
- Recorded: 1997
- Genre: Latin pop • Pop rock • Power ballad
- Length: 4:25
- Label: BMG U.S. Latin
- Songwriter: Alfredo Matheus
- Producer: Rudy Pérez

Cristian singles chronology
| "Si Tu Me Amaras" (1997) | "Lloran Las Rosas" (1997) | "Lloraré" (1997) |

Music video
- "Lloran La Rosas" on YouTube

Audio sample
- "Lloran Las Rosas": file; help

"Lloran Las Rosas" (English: The Roses Cry) is a power ballad written by Alfredo Matheus Diez and performed by Mexican singer-songwriter Cristian Castro. It was released by BMG U.S. Latin on November 3, 1997, as the fourth single from his fifth studio album Lo Mejor de Mí (1997). In 2012, Castro recorded a live version of "Lloran Las Rosas" as a vallenato duet with Colombian musicians Jorge Celedón and Jimmy Zimbrano. This version was included on his second live album Primera fila: Día 2 in 2014.

== Chart performance ==
| Chart (1998) | Peak position |
|---|---|
| U.S. Billboard Hot Latin Tracks | 9 |
| U.S. Billboard Latin Pop Airplay | 3 |

== Music video ==
A music video, directed by J.C. Barros, was shot in 1998.

== Covers ==
In 2000, salsa musician Dominic covered the song which peaked at No. 21 on the Hot Latin Songs chart. In 2005, Brazilian duo Bruno & Marrone also covered the song in a Portuguese version, called "Choram as Rosas".
