= Raúl Di Blasio =

Raúl di Blasio
- Born: Zapala, Argentina
- Genres: Latin pop, easy listening
- Occupation: Musician
- Instrument: Piano

Raúl Di Blasio (born November 14, 1949) is an Argentine composer, arranger and pianist.

== Life ==
Born in Zapala, Argentina, Raúl Di Blasio showed a great interest in piano at the age of six. After his parents' recommendations that he should study music, he began to pursue piano as a career.

Di Blasio practiced piano alongside his teachers for more than four years. Having difficulty in purchasing a piano, he also relied on readily available sources of music such as whistling with his father, which helped develop the sort of melodies he employs in his work. One of his teachers was the renowned Argentinian composer and Pianist Bebu Silvetti from whom Di Blasio drew great inspiration. In fact, a lot of Di Blasio's musical pieces were composed by Bebu Silvetti; one of which was called "Piano" which was considered as the first step into his musical career.

This was the beginning of Di Blasio's career in music. He had early formation in the Classic Technique, but he equally enjoys popular music. He admits that when he was 17 years old he was part of the rock movement with phenomena such as The Beatles. However, his parents asked him to pursue university studies and have a degree-based career in his life.

The next step for him was to leave his hometown and go to Buenos Aires, where at age 20, he began practicing music 12 hours per day. He comments: "I felt I had wings on my fingers."

Di Blasio is someone who thrives on constant change. He moved to Chile in 1978, where he began playing traditional music, rock, and classic music. He composed and worked as a pianist in a bar, confessing he "scraped by to survive...", but that he was still happy doing so.

In 1983 he released his first album on EMI Chile. A producer from the Chilean record company BCS-S contracted with Di Blasio for his second album, which included Latin American music.

== Duets ==
Di Blasio has made a historical duet in Santo Domingo with the international renowned French pianist Richard Clayderman. Di Blasio made duets with Tomey Sellars, Alejandro Fernández, Marco Antonio Solís, José José, Armando Manzanero, Marco Antonio Muñiz, Yolandita Monge, Julio Iglesias, Rocío Dúrcal, Juan Gabriel, Michael Bolton, Los Tri-o, José Luis Rodríguez "El Puma", Cristian Castro, Vargas de Tecalitlán, José Feliciano, El Consorcio, London Symphony Orchestra, Fernando De La Mora, Wendy Pedersen, and more.

== Notable usages of his work ==
Otoñal (autumnal), a piano performance from his album Barroco, has been used as competition music by elite figure skaters such as Maria Butyrskaya, Johnny Weir, and Yuzuru Hanyu.

== Discography ==
- Sur de America (1991)
- Dodo Afefo (1991)
- Alrededor del Mundo (1991)
- Barroco (1991)
- En tiempo de Amor (1993)
- Piano de America (1994)
- Greatest Hits (1995)
- Latino (1995)
- Personalidad (1996)
- Grandes Exitos (1996)
- 20 de Coleccion (1996)
- Solo (1997)
- Piano De America 2 (1998)
- Desde México: El Piano De América (1998)
- Serie 2000 (2000)
- De Mis Manos (2000)
- Brasileirinho (2000)
- Di Blasio-Gardel Tango (2002)
- Bohemia Vol.1 (with José José, Marco Antonio Munis and Armando Manzanero)
- Bohemia Vol.2 (with José José, Marco Antonio Munis and Armando Manzanero)
- Di Blasio El Piano De America... Y Amigos (2003)
- Clave De Amor (with José Luis Rodríguez "el Puma" (2003))
- La Historia Del Piano de America...Los Exitos (2006)
- Christmas (2006)
- Primavera (2008)

== See also ==
- List of best-selling Latin music artists
