= Rudy Pérez =

Cuban-born American musician, songwriter, producer and composer

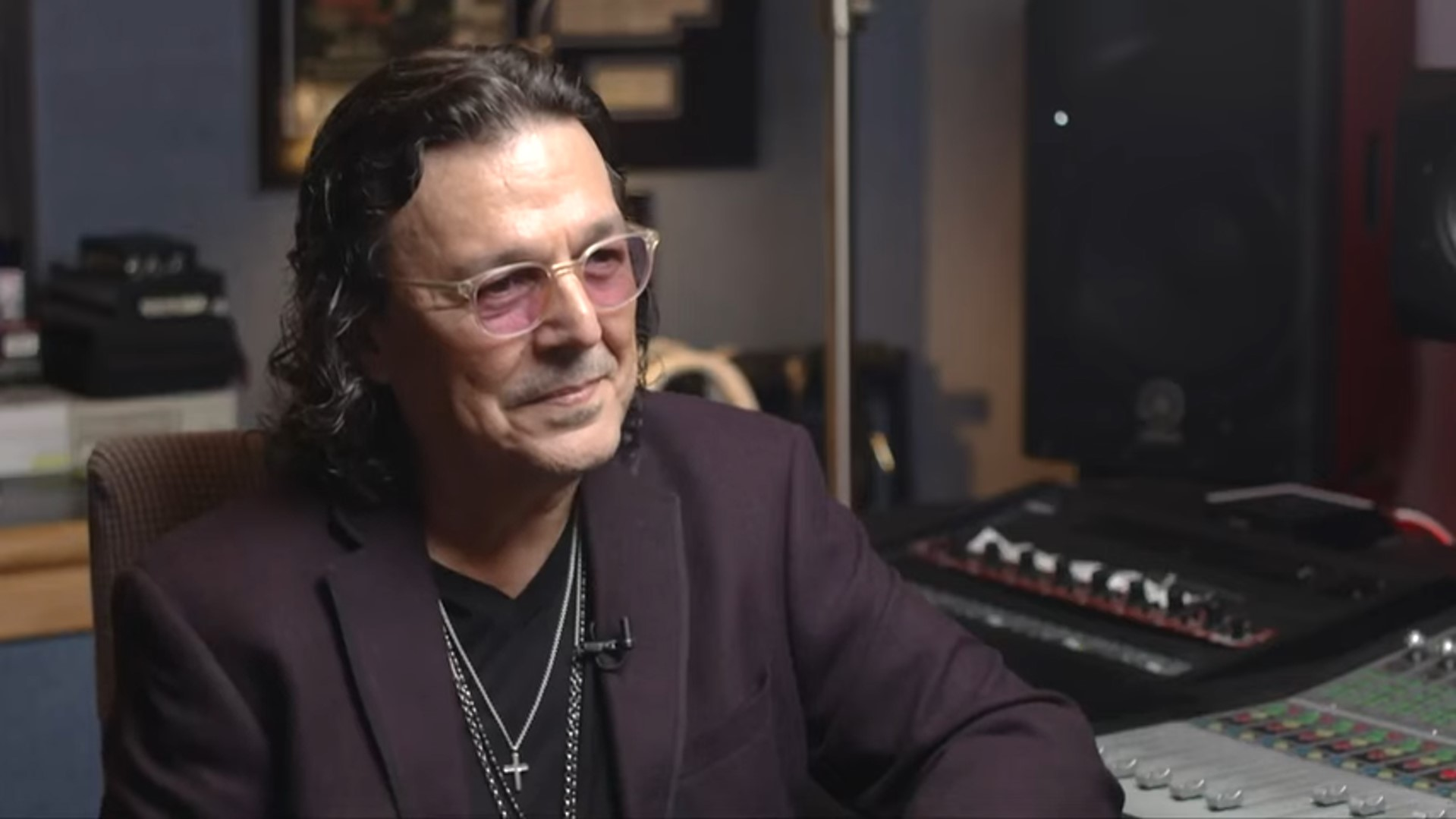
- Rudy Pérez in 2022

Background information
- Born: Rudy Amado Pérez; May 14, 1958 (age 68); Pinar del Río, Cuba
- Genres: Pop; Latin ballad; R&B
- Occupations: Songwriter; composer; producer; arranger; sound engineer; musical director; singer
- Instruments: Guitar; piano
- Years active: 1983–present
- Labels: Rudy Pérez Enterprises; Bullseye Productions
- Website: rudyperez.com

Rudy Amado Pérez (born May 14, 1958) is a Cuban-born American musician, songwriter, composer, producer, arranger, sound engineer, musical director and singer, (Note: The order of Perez's musical tasks indicated in the article's introduction follows the order of Pérez's musical tasks established by him in an interview by TV y Novelas magazine. He based the order of the tasks on their relevance to his profession. Thus, he pointed out that he was primarily a musician and a songwriter, while he was a singer last.) as well as entertainment entrepreneur, and philanthropist. His area of specialty is ballads, although he has also worked in a variety of other genres.

Pérez has produced more than 70 albums, composed over 1,000 songs (over 300 of which have been number one or have reached the top 10 charts), and written and produced music for popular international artists such as Westlife, Natalie Cole, José Feliciano, Julio Iglesias, Luis Miguel, Raúl di Blasio, Jaci Velasquez, Cristian Castro, Christina Aguilera, Michael Bolton, Luis Fonsi, Marc Anthony, Toño Rosario, Jennifer Lopez, Il Divo, and Beyoncé.

He has won many music awards throughout his career, including being voted the most important Latin composer four times (four years), and winning the title of Producer of the Decade in 2010, awarded by Billboard to the producer with the most top 10 hits of the decade. He is the first Latin producer to win Billboard's Producer of the Year award four years consecutively.

Pérez owns the record labels Rudy Pérez Enterprises (RPE) and Bullseye Productions. He is a founding partner and the Chief Creative Officer of DiGa Entertainment and the co-founder of the Latin Academy of Recording Arts and Sciences (LARAS), the Latin Grammys. He was instrumental in the production of the premiere of the inaugural Latin Grammy Awards of 2000 and is on the board of the American Society of Composers, Authors and Publishers (ASCAP). In April 2013, Pérez (along with Desmond Child) created the Pabellón de la Fama de los Compositores Latinos (Latin Songwriters Hall of Fame; LSHOF), in Miami Beach, to honor the most important Latino composers and to drive them to continue creating Latin music.

== Early years ==
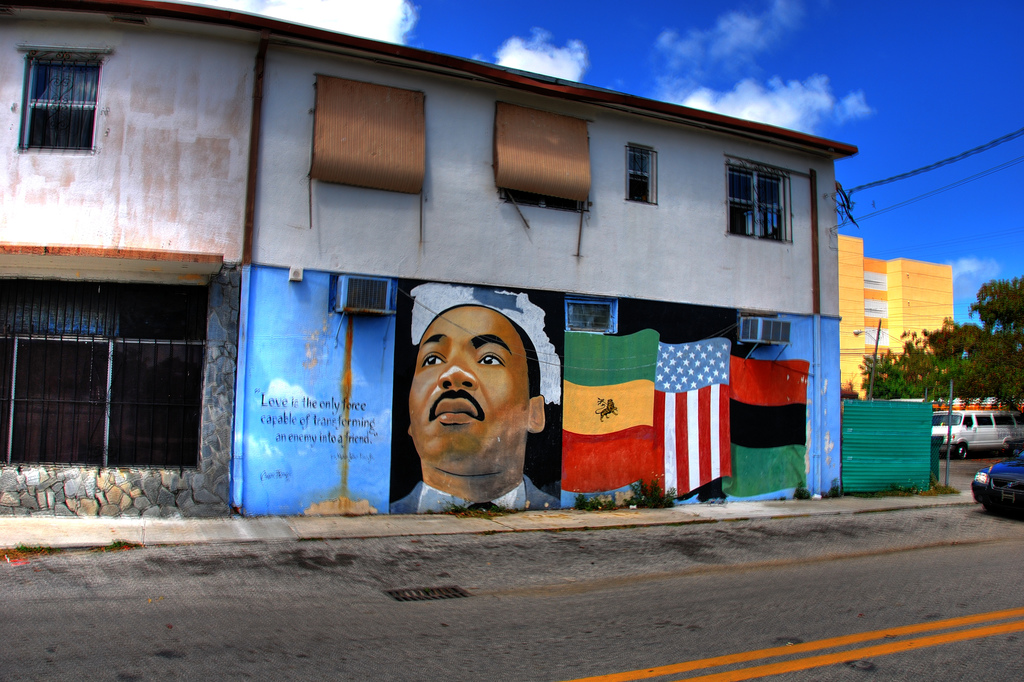
Liberty City, the African American neighborhood where Perez was raised from age 9

Rudy Amado Pérez was born on May 14, 1958, in Pinar del Río, Cuba, to Baptist parents. His grandfather was a Baptist minister. Pérez's father, Rudy Amado, was a painter, religious minister and writer, who served as lieutenant in the army of Cuban former president Fulgencio Batista, and was imprisoned following the Cuban Revolution of 1959, due to his involvement in prior conflict with Castro's communist forces. The remainder of his family consisted of his mother, Elsa Pérez, a seamstress, who made fine clothes and baskets, and three siblings (two sisters and a brother).

When Pérez was nine years old, his family emigrated to the United States, (Note: Perez's age when he emigrated to the U.S. with his family varies among sources. According to different written sources (including interviews), he was 6, 7 or 8. However, Perez said in the Show de Jaime Bayly (television show in Miami) in January 2013 that he emigrated to U.S. at 9.) leaving their home country to flee the political regime of Castro. The Pérez family moved to Miami, initially living in a refugee camp, but soon settled in Liberty City, Florida.

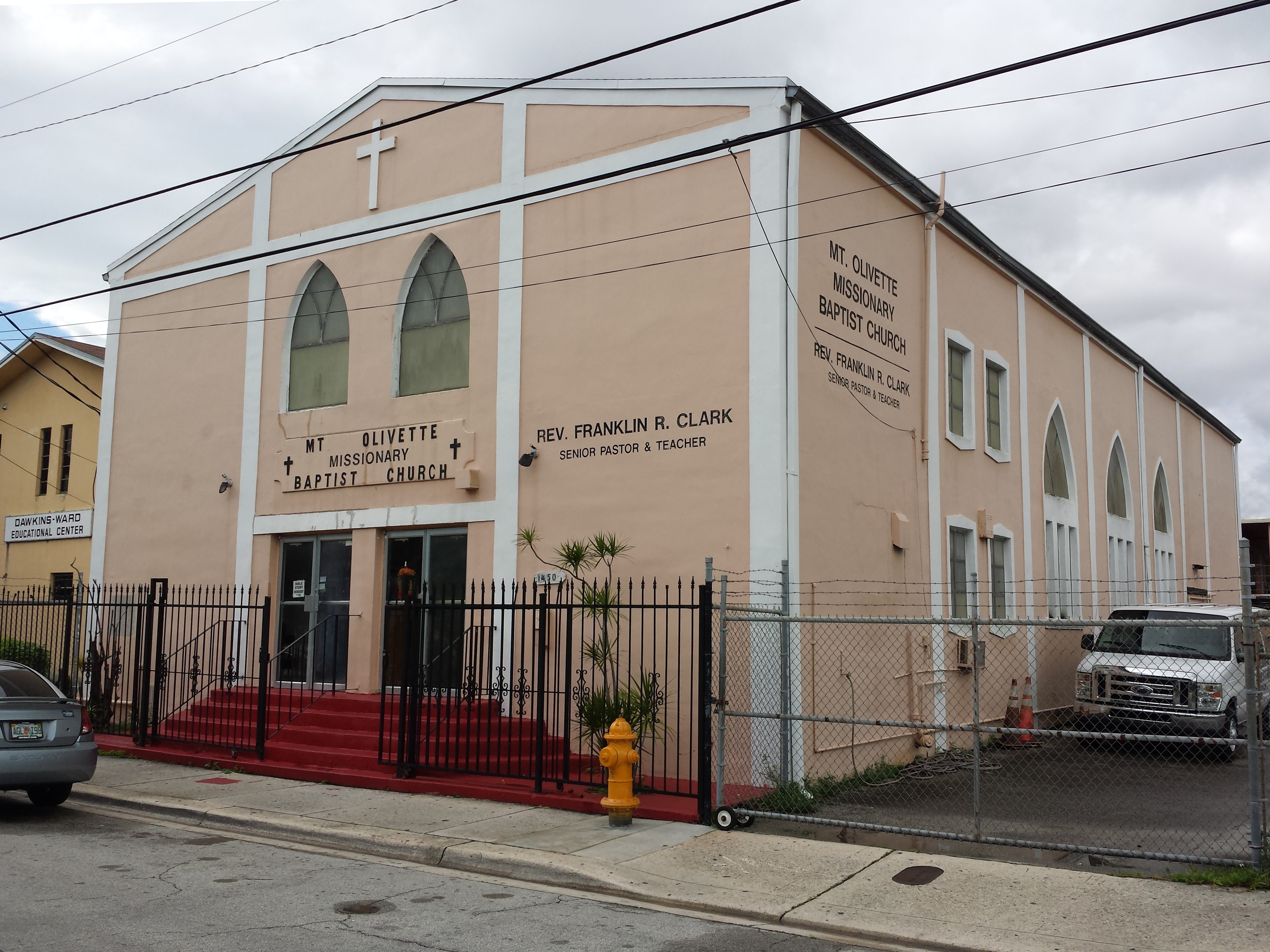
Pérez learned to sing and play instruments in the Baptist church which his family attended.

Pérez discovered his interest in music as a child, influenced by bolero and rock music. He began singing at age two. It is reported that he was able to sing in perfect tune and he used any object like a musical instrument. After hearing the music of Frédéric Chopin's pianist, Pérez was inspired to become a musician and learn to play the piano. He began singing and playing in the choir at the neighborhood Baptist church in the same year that his family arrived in the US, under the tutelage of the ministers, who taught him to sing and to play the guitar and piano. Pérez was also influenced by the African-American community, being subsequently introduced to R&B and gospel music.

At age twelve, Pérez worked for a company that manufactured barbed wire to buy an electric guitar (since his parents, according to Pérez, could not afford to pay for it). After a year of work he was able to buy the guitar, his first musical instrument, although he could not play it for three months due to the hand injuries he received working at the factory. He then began private guitar lessons. Throughout his teenage years he worked at hardware stores, gas stations and as valet to buy instruments and amplifiers.

== Pearly Queen ==
Pérez quit school to join several rock bands in his neighborhood, until at age 15 he was invited to join the group Pearly Queen, a top 40 cover band that was popular in Miami in 1973. The group sang in English and was required to play the "hit" songs of the time.

They won a contract to play for the Big Daddy Flanigan clubs in both the US and Canada (90 venues), playing five sets per night for five or six nights per week. The interpretations of the band in these clubs provided to Perez an introduction to music production, as he was responsible for the arrangements of the versions that the band played. He decided to study the arrangement and the recording of music. The band pitched two albums: Treasure Hunt (1974) and Disco? (1976) and had four singles and EPs: "Miénteme" (Move On), "Quit Jive' In" (Jungle Walk), "Adoro" (More) and "Understanding" (Young In Love; Yo Lo Comprendo). He stayed in the group for five years and, at age twenty, left the group to produce and write songs for local Latino singers in Miami.

== Composing career ==
=== Miami Sound Studios and songwriter career starts ===
Later, Pérez began working as a gofer at Miami Sound Studios, in the studio of Carlos Diaz-Granados (doing things such as cleaning the studio or fetching food for the people who worked there), He lived in the studio for two years, according to Perez, because he "was just going through a divorce". He lived, cleaned and slept there. He "watched and learned all the details" about the musical work, and learned engineering.

In 1983, he began working at Pablo Cano's studios Clímax, in North Miami on 30th Street, where he worked as an unpaid intern, and was allowed to live at the studio for a year and a half. He continued looking at the details of the recordings of albums and songs by other artists. He was determined to record his own songs and not just do demos for his friends.

According to Pérez, he was discovered by Pablo Cano's niece, when she heard him perform a song he had composed. She showed Cano a ballad that Pérez had written, and Cano decided to hire him permanently, "paying him a good salary", to make an album with him. Thus, Pérez got his first opportunity as a composer: Cano offered him to record with a band and to submit him to a company of musical albums. The band composed four songs, and Pérez gave his songs to top arrangers who asked for his material. After a while, however, he wasn't comfortable with the changes being made to the songs and he decided to make this song the way he "felt them". During this time, he began working with other artists who he met at the studio, such as Roberto Carlos and Gloria Estefan, and continued studying music.

Finally, in 1983, Pérez released the album ¿Qué voy a hacer sin tí? (What am I going to do without you?), with a promotional song by the same title. Jose Menendez, who was working at RCA Records at the time, heard the album and decided to hire him.

This is when Pérez became a producer. A few weeks later, while he was on a promotional tour of his manager, Pablo Cano, in Puerto Rico, he met José Feliciano, for whom Menendez had played their version of "¿Qué voy a hacer sin tí?". Feliciano asked him to produce his next album. Pérez produced most of Feliciano's Ya soy tuyo album (I'm already yours) and it reached number one with the song "Me has echado al olvido" (you have thrown me into oblivion). This album also won two Grammy Award nominations for production and the song "Ella" (She) in 1985. The album marked Feliciano's return to the elite of Latin music. Pérez became a professor of production and musical composition of their albums for two decades.

=== Composing and producing career since 1986 ===
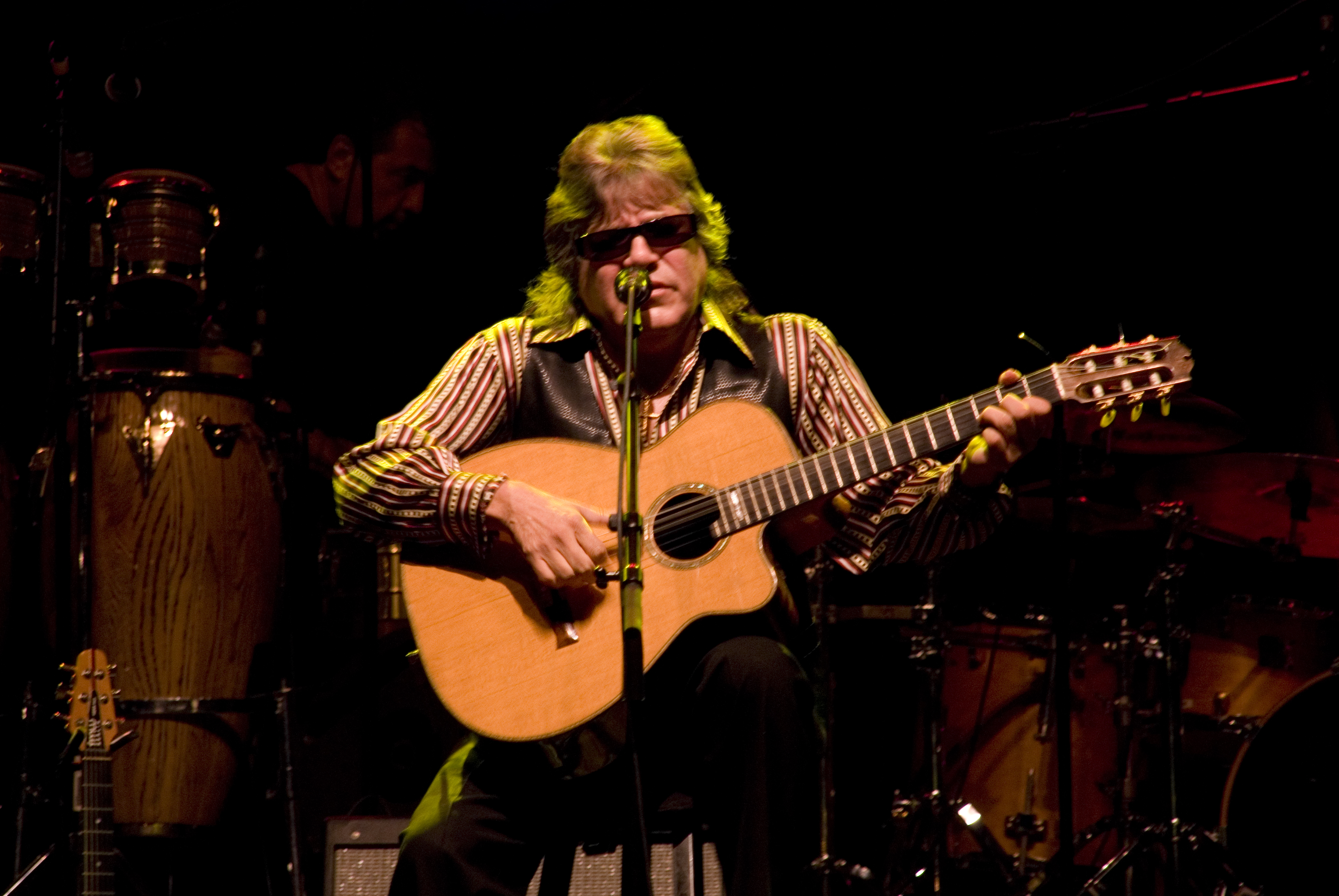
José Feliciano was the first singer whom Pérez produced.

The Pérez album ¿Qué voy a hacer sin tí? was awarded with a Gold record. In 1986, Pérez earned a Grammy Award as Producer in the "Best Latin Pop Performance" category with the José Feliciano's song "Ya Soy Tuyo" ("I am already for you"), and in 1988 Billboard named him "Producer of the Year" for the first time. The success of his work with Feliciano opened the door for him to work with other singers. In 1992, WEA hired him to collaborate on the production of the record Aries by Luis Miguel, which meant he had to sign an exclusivity contract preventing him from producing for others until 1997. In 1993, he won another Grammy Award as Producer and Songwriter for the "Best Latin Pop Album" Aries, by Luis Miguel, and the following year, Rudy Pérez pitched his followup album, after ¿Qué voy a hacer sin tí?"Rudy" (also known as "Sencillos y otros"; in English: Singles and others), whose most played song was "Mi manera de querer" (My way of loving). However, the album was not very successful and Perez decided to focus only on his career as a composer.

In 1997, after his contract with WEA came to an end, Pérez wrote and produced the album Lo Mejor De Mi for Mexican singer Cristian Castro, an album with the hit song of the same name (which stayed for more than 90 weeks on the charts), "Después de Ti...¿Qué?" (dedicated to his mother, who later died of cancer), and "Si Tú Me Amaras". This album reached #1 on Hot Latin Tracks of 1997 and received a Grammy Award nomination for Best Latin Pop Album of 1998. The title track was included in the 1999 compilation Billboard Latin Music Awards Superstar Hits. The chart-topping album, along with Millie's "De hoy En Adelante" and "Una Voz en el Alma", also composed by Rudy Pérez, won him ASCAP Awards in 2000.

In 1997 Ricky Martin also reached #1 on Hot Latin Tracks of 1997 and was included in the 1999 compilation recording Billboard Latin Music Awards Superstar Hits. In 1999 he also received the Ace Awards for Senor Bolero for "Album of the Year" recorded by José Feliciano and a concession of the dove through the production of the album by Christian artist Jaci Velasquez Llegar A Ti. This album featured the ballad "Solo Tú" which made the top 10 on Billboard's Latin chart. That year, he received the ASCAP Award for "Songwriter of the Year".

In 2000, Pérez produced the album by Luis Fonsi, Eterno, composing seven of its 13 songs, including the hit "Imagíname Sin Ti" and its English version (Imagine me without you). (Note: Later, Pérez would collaborate again with Fonsi in some songs from their two albums following: Amor secreto (between them, the single "Quisiera poder olvidarme de tí", winning of other award to the Pop/Balada Song. The album was released in 2002) and Abrazar la vida (released in 2003).)

In 2000, due to the success of their production of Spanish album by Jaci Velasquez in 1999, Pérez decided to produce the Spanish-language album by Christina Aguilera Mi Reflejo, through which he came into contact with Ron Fair RCA. This became one of the most successful albums in Spanish in the world, selling 1 million copies in the U.S. and another 2.5 million in the rest of the world, and won the 2001 Latin Grammy for "Best Female Pop Album". The success of this album and the Grammy Award he received allowed him to work with Anglophone artists in the United States and elsewhere, producing and composing songs in Spanish for singers and bands like Westlife and Michael Bolton.

After Pérez's work on the Spanish songs of these artists, they also wanted him to work with them on their songs in English. Thus, his work with Jaci Velasquez produced the song "Imagine Me Without You", which was adapted into English of the song produced earlier for he to Luis Fonsi "Imagíname sin tí". It was nominated for a CMA - Dove Award for Best Song of the Year. In 2002, Pérez wrote the song "I Wanna Hear You Say It" for the English album Michael Bolton, by the same singer. The tracks were co-written and co-produced by Pérez along with Bolton and Billy Mann. He also worked on some English songs of others English-speaking singers (or other singers who were not Hispanic), such as Charlie Williams (in the song "If You Should Leave Me") or Julia Kova ("Don't go for anything but love").

Many of his songs have become top ten hits. In 2002, the song he produced for Pilar Montenegro, "Quítame ese hombre", was the first to reach number 1, remaining in this position for 13 consecutive weeks. After this, he continued composing and producing songs that have also reached No. 1. Other of his songs have reached number one, remaining there for many weeks, such as "El Dolor De Tu Presencia" by Jennifer Peña, also produced in 2002, which remained at No. 1 for nine weeks. (Note: During that time, his productions were able, together, to stay 22 consecutive weeks at no. 1.)

In this year, Pérez also worked on the Jordi's album Tú no sospechas (in Spanish: "You have no idea"), on which he was responsible for 11 tracks. The album was released on October 8, 2002, to which was added a first single, the title track, produced by veteran stars as Alejandro Jaén. The song "Tú no sospechas" was the only song on the album played all over the U.S. and some countries of Latin America, appearing on the most important charts in these countries.

In 2004, Pérez created his own record label: Rudy Pérez Enterprises, RPE.

In 2005, Pérez was elected as a Latino producer / songwriter of the year. He also wrote songs on all Il Divo's albums. Between 2006 and 2007, he produced Beyoncé's Spanish album Irreemplazable, which was nominated for a Grammy.

In September 2009, he launched his second record label, Bullseye Productions.

In January 2010 he won the "Producer of the Decade" award from Billboard, for his constant success over ten years in public preference lists.

In 2012, Pérez released his third album, Lo mejor de mí ("The best of me"), a compilation of many of the songs he had composed for other singers, interpreted by him. Later, he produced the first Spanish language album of American singer Natalie Cole: Natalie Cole en Español, released on June 25, 2013. In 2014, Pérez released the single "Despues de ti... ¿Qué?", sung by himself on the Mother's Day.

== Music in other media ==
Pérez has also composed and produced numerous songs for other medias, such as film soundtracks and TV soundtracks (songs for television). His music has appeared in movies, soap operas, sitcoms, world music specials, commercials and music television channels.

Pérez also worked with some advertising companies, writing and producing songs for ads. He was hired by AT&T, for which he wrote and produced the music for the "True Voice" and "Leadership" advertising campaigns, sung by the Cuban singer Jon Secada. Perez wrote the original theme song for Univision, which was produced in 1995 and is still being used today. He also composed the central theme of the Beverly Hills, 90210 special Valentine episode, "Come as you are". In 1992 he was hired by Disney to work on pre-production on the song "Colors of the Wind" for the animated film Pocahontas.

His songs have not only been directed at singers, cinema and television. Between the end of the 1990s and early in the 21st century, he wrote and produced the official Olympic song to the Telemundo's Olympic coverage in English and Spanish, which was sung by Michelangelo Mejia.

Pérez also wrote the theme "Vamos al Mundial" (Let's go to the World Cup), the song was used by Univision Network for the 2002 World Cup, which was sung by Jennifer Peña.

In 2007, Pérez produced the Amor Gitano song for the soap opera Zorro, La Espada y la Rosa, recorded as a duet by Alejandro Fernández and Beyoncé. In 2011, he wrote the song "La fuerza del destino" with Mauricio Abaroa Suzarte, sung by Marc Anthony and Sandra Echeverría for the soap opera of the same title.

According to the journalist J. Freedorm du Lac, his singles have been used for various themes such as "breakups, makeups, courtships, wedding dances, babymaking, proms, self-pity sessions and bouts of teenage melodrama".

== Other projects ==
On April 23, 2007, the global electronic community elHood.com announced a collaboration with Rudy Pérez and DiGa Entertainment. This union allows Perez to produce a series of musical projects directly with music fans. The first project was an album for singer and actress Pilar Montenegro. During a competition organized by elHood, fans accessing the site of the singer heard songs from singer's new album, vote for their favorites, and send their reactions. The singer chose a fan from the contestants to join her and Perez in the studio during the album's production. elhood transmit the video process exclusive and regular reports on the official website of singer. DIGA Entertainment, of which Perez is Chief Creative Officer, together with Epana, a service company marketing and communications aimed at the Hispanic market at a national level, promoted the contest with a new marketing technology that reached some seven million Mexican consumers per month through phone cards and approximately 35 million pre-recorded announcements.

Pérez was one of the founders of the American Society of Composers, Authors and Publishers (ASCAP)'s Latin Council. He and Desmond Child created the Pabellón de la Fama de los Compositores Latinos (in Spanish: Latin Songwriters Hall of Fame – LSHOF), which opened in October 2012, in Miami Beach, to honor the most important Latino composers (those whose first success was made more than 20 years ago). According to them, the nonprofit organization's mission "is to educate, preserve, honor and celebrate the legacy of the greatest Latin songwriters from all over the world and their music in every genre while developing and inspiring new songwriters through workshops, showcases, scholarships and digital initiatives.

The Hall of Fame has a nominating committee that was created to choose 24 Spanish and Portuguese people, from which five winners will be selected. The award is a statuette, "The Muse", that reflects his long history in music. For a composer, artist or song to be considered, they must be at least 20 years on the air.

The foundation was officially registered in 2012, and is in the development of the headquarters building, which will be a museum in the city of Miami that will show things related to Latin music, information about the great composers, history behind the songs and performers, and other educational information. The museum, sponsored by the American Songwriters Hall of Fame, will offer projects from art galleries and music, educational workshops, music classes and composition, educational scholarships and composition contests. Perez and Child plan to expand this foundation to Mexico and Argentina. The museum opened in 2014. The foundation plans to recognize music icons, first at composition and then in other categories in music. On April 23, 2013, the first awards gala was held in Miami, honoring seven iconic songwriters, including Manuel Alejandro, Jose Feliciano, José Ángel Espinoza "Ferrusquilla," Julio Iglesias, Armando Manzanero, Concha Valdés Miranda, and a posthumous recognition award for Roberto Cantoral.

Currently, Pérez is working on a book with thousands of stories about many of the artists he has worked with.

== Awards and recognition ==
Pérez's compositions have included numerous top ten hits during the last 20 years (over 300 of which have been #1 or have reached the Top 10 Charts). Some of them have remained in the top position of the charts for many consecutive weeks (between 9 and 13 weeks), such as "Quitame ese hombre" (by Pilar Montenegro; 13 weeks in the top position) and "El Dolor de tu precensia" (Jennifer Peña; 9 weeks in the top position). He won the Hot Latin Songs, being also the first Hispanic composer and producer to win this award, and he was chosen as producer of the year for four consecutive years. He is the first Latino producer who has won the Billboard Hot Latin Tracks Producer of the Year for four consecutive years. Perez has been awarded ASCAP songwriter of the year five times.

The success of the songs he has composed and produced earned 30 gold records and 50 platinum. His work has been nominated for 19 Latin Grammy Awards, of which he won five. Considered one of the "most outstanding creators" in the field of international pop music, he also has been voted the most important Latin composer and won the title of "Producer of the Decade" in 2010, awarded by Billboard magazine for having the most songs at number # 1 and Top Ten Hits from 2000 to 2010, more than any other producer in Latino history. He was elected the first president of the Florida branch (which now is a full chapter) of NARAS.

Pérez has received more than 400 awards for albums that have reached gold and platinum sales.

== Philanthropy ==
In 2003, Pérez launched a scholarship program of the ASCAP Foundation (Rudy Pérez Songwriting), which allows for Hispanic songwriters with great talent, but without resources and with a little success in their compositions, to study at prestigious music schools worldwide. He gave $25,000 for the start of the first scholarship. The scholarship rotates annually among students from five universities. The first scholarship is awarded in Miami, and the others are given to the Juilliard School of Music at New York, the National Conservatory of Music at Puerto Rico and High School of Art and music at the University of Texas at San Antonio.

In 2012, Pérez, along with David Frangioni, Mark Hudson and Jon Secada, developed an educational program for talented young musicians called IDA ("Inspire & Develop Artists"), whose role is to guide and teach them to develop their musical talent. In the program, twhichhat only lasts a week (the first was developed between November 25 – December 1 in Miami Beach), a participant with great talent for music or singing is chosen by his team (formed by composers, engineers, teachers of singing, and musicians), through its website, to be with the four main mentors (including Pérez himself). According to Pérez, through the program, the boy "goes a superstar" after spending only one week in the program.

According to PR Newswire, "The course includes classes in singing, composing, recording, mixing and studio technology, rehearsals, live performances, stage presence, and special guests from the music business. Classes are kept to a maximum of 12 people to ensure that participants receive personalized attention. Those selected will work with teachers and they will also have tutorials and staff support by other experts in the world of music to cover all aspects of the industry. At the end of the program, each participant will have the skills to compete in this profession including image creation, choreography training, business fundamentals and professional recording their own song to help them launch their careers".

The program was first released in English and, in January 2013, was released in Spanish.

== Personal life ==
Rudy Pérez has one daughter with his first wife (whom he married at age 19) and four children with his second wife, Betsy.

According to him, "life inspired my songs, however, I only write about what I would like to live". He admires artists like Frédéric Chopin, Giacomo Puccini, George Gershwin, The Beatles, Brian Wilson, Charles Aznavour, Stevie Wonder and Manuel Alejandro.

Pérez reported that, while he worked for Pearly Queen, he decided to compose only English songs. However, after dating a Spanish rich girl in Miami, whose parents never accepted the relationship (and who sent her "away", making it impossible to maintain the relationship), he heard the song of Julio Iglesias, "Abrázame" (Hold me), and since this moment Pérez decided to also write songs in Spanish.

== Discography ==
Pérez, in addition to his job as composer and producer, is also a singer. His albums can be divided into two categories: those he launched while working on the Rock band from Miami Pearly Queen (1973–1977) and those he launched as a soloist.

=== Pearly Queen ===
- Treasure Hunt - 1974
- Disco? - 1976

=== As a soloist ===
- ¿Qué voy a hacer sin tí? - 1984
- Rudy (also known as "Sencillos y otros"; in English: Singles and others) - 1994
- Lo mejor de mí ("The best of me", an album compilation of many of his songs, but sung by himself) - 2012

== Awards ==
=== American Society of Composers, Authors and Publishers Awards ===
Pérez has won the following ASCAP awards.

Year	Nominee / work	Award	Result
1994	"Ayer"	Pop Songs	Won
1995	"Tu y Yo"	Pop Songs	Won
1995	"Vivir lo Nuestro"	Tropical Songs	Won
1996	"Se Mi Sigue Olvidando"	Tropical Songs	Won
1998	"Lo Mejor de Mí"	Pop Songs	Won
1999	"Lo Mejor de Mí"	Pop Songs	Won
1999	"El Amor Nunca Pregunta"	Tropical Songs	Won
1999	Himself	Songwriter of the Year	Won
2000	Himself	Songwriter of the Year	Won
2000	"Una Voz en el Alma"	Pop Songs	Won
2000	"De Hoy en Adelante"	Pop Songs	Won
2000	"Después de Ti...¿Qué?"	Pop Songs	Won
2001	"Que Voy a Hacer Sin Ti"	Regional Mexican Songs	Won
2001	"Imaginame Sin Ti (Imagine Me Without You)"	Pop/Balada Songs	Won
2001	"Solo Tú"	Pop/Balada Songs	Won
2002	"Cómo Se Cura una Herida"	Pop/Balada Songs	Won
2003	"El Dolor de Tu Presencia"	Pop/Balada Songs	Won
2003	"Hay Otra en Tu Lugar"	Pop/Balada Songs	Won
2003	"Quisiera Poder Olvidarme de Ti"	Pop/Balada Songs	Won
2004	Himself	Songwriters of the Year	Won
2004	"Si No Estás"	Pop/Balada Songs	Won
2005	Himself	Songwriter of the Year	Won
2005	"Te Llamé"	Pop/Balada Songs	Won
2005	"Vivo y Muero en Tu Piel"	Pop/Balada Songs	Won
2011	"Amor Quédate"	Pop/Ballad Songs	Won
2012	"Mi Corazón Insiste"	Pop Songs	Won
