= Mi Vida Sin Tu Amor =

Studio album by Cristian Castro
- Released: June 1, 1999
- Genre: Bolero, Latin pop
- Label: BMG
- Producer: Kike Santander

Cristian Castro chronology
Lo Mejor De Mi (1997)	Mi Vida Sin Tu Amor (1999)	Remixes (2000)

Singles from Mi Vida Sin Tu Amor
- 1. "Alguna Vez" Released: 1999; 2. "Mi Vida Sin Tu Amor" Released: August 1999; 3. "Volver a Amar" Released: October 1999; 4. "Por Amarte Así" Released: 2000

Professional ratings
Review scores
Source	Rating
Allmusic	3/5 stars

Mi Vida Sin Tu Amor (My Life Without Your Love) is the sixth studio album by Mexican singer Cristian Castro released in 1999. It was nominated for Best Latin Pop Album of 2000.

== Track listing ==
1. "Volver A Amar"
2. "Tu Sombra En Mí"
3. "Mi Vida Sin Tu Amor"
4. "Por Amarte Así"
5. "Más Y Más"
6. "Ángel"
7. "Alguna Vez [Theme From The Telenovela, Ángela]"
8. "Si Me Ves Llorar Por Ti"
9. "Vivir Sin Ti"
10. "Verónica"

== Charts ==
Chart (1999)	Peak position
U.S. Billboard Top Latin Albums	3
U.S. Billboard Latin Pop Albums	7
U.S. Billboard Heatseekers Albums	13

== Sales and certifications ==
Region	Certification	Certified units/sales
Argentina (CAPIF)	3× Platinum	180,000^{^}
Chile	—	75,000
Mexico (AMPROFON)	Platinum	150,000^{^}
United States (RIAA)	4× Platinum (Latin)	274,000
^{^} Shipments figures based on certification alone.
