= Cristian Castro =

Mexican pop singer (born 1974)

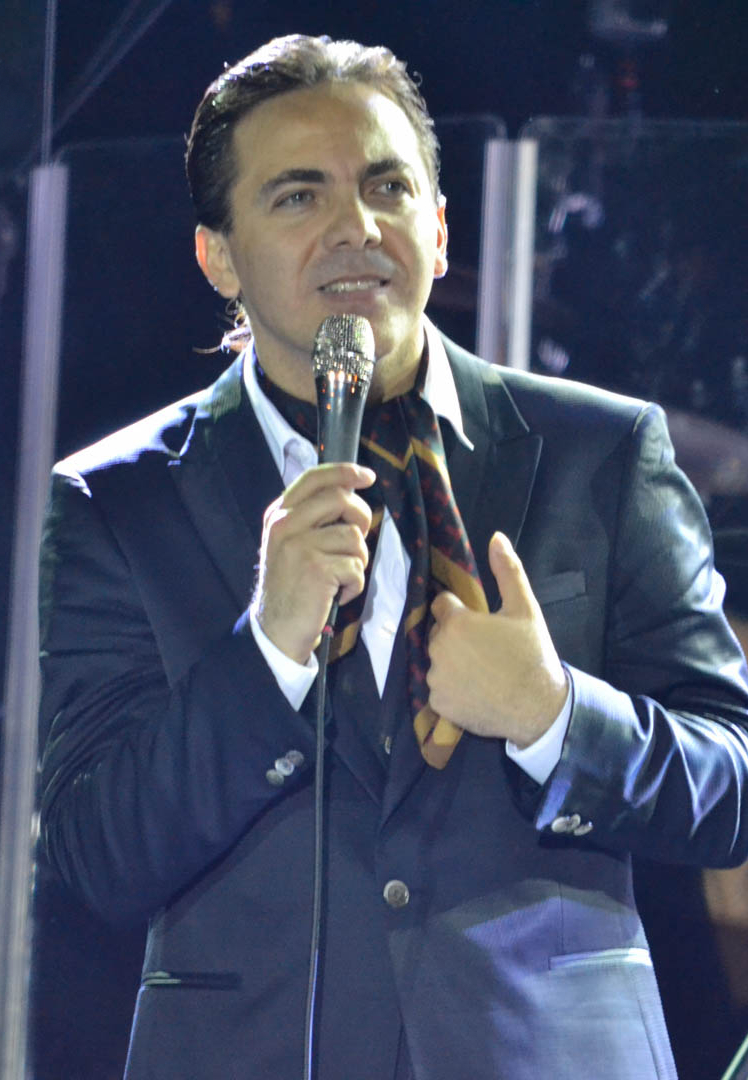
- Castro in 2015

Background information
- Born: Cristian Sáinz Castro; 8 December 1974 (age 51); Mexico City, Mexico
- Genres: Latin pop, bolero, mariachi, pop rock, Latin rock, alternative rock, soft rock
- Occupation: Singer
- Years active: 1981–present
- Labels: Orfeón, Fonovisa, BMG U.S. Latin, Universal Music Latino, Sony Music Latin

Cristian Sáinz Castro (born 8 December 1974) is a Mexican pop singer. He is the son of actors Verónica Castro and Manuel "El Loco" Valdés, and nephew of actors Ramón Valdés (known for playing Don Ramón in El Chavo del Ocho) and Germán "Tin-Tan" Valdés. Castro has sold over 12 million records, making him one of the best-selling Latin music artists of all-time.

Juan Gabriel described Castro as "the man with the most faculties to sing in Mexico".

== Biography ==
Born in Mexico City, he is the son of actress and singer Verónica Castro and comedian Manuel "El Loco" Valdés. Castro also has a younger brother named Michelle Sáinz Castro. His uncle is José Alberto Castro, and his aunt is Beatriz Castro; both are producers. As a baby, he made his acting debut with his aunt in the telenovela named El derecho de nacer. Soon after, he appeared on a television commercial with her and on the Mexican version of the musical Mame, starring Silvia Pinal.

Castro is one of the best selling Latin artists and has worked with Latin producers Kike Santander, Rudy Pérez, and Richard Daniel Roman. In 1984, Castro made his first appearance on TV as a singer in the Televisa's child contest Juguemos a Cantar, but he did not qualify for the finals because of his young age.

=== 1992–1996: Fonovisa years ===
Castro began his professional singing career in 1992 with the release of Agua Nueva at the age of 18. This album was a huge success in Mexico and earned him a grammy nomination for Best Latin Album. After appearing in several telenovelas and recording some albums as a teenager, he began his "internationalization" in 1993, starting with concerts in Puerto Rico. Castro dedicated a song to that country in his second album, Un Segundo En El Tiempo, titled Puerto Rico as a way of thanking the Puerto Rican public for supporting his career. He modified his singing from the deep voice he employed in Agua Nueva to a softer one. His song "Nunca Voy a Olvidarte" ("I Will Never Forget You") became his first number-one hit on the Hot Latin Tracks chart in 1993 and helped start his career. He became an international teen idol and sex symbol after he began touring. He received a nomination for Pop New Artist of the Year at the Lo Nuestro Awards of 1993.

In 1994, Cristian released El Camino del Alma. The album hit "Mañana" ("Tomorrow") was composed by Mexican singer Juan Gabriel ("Mañana, Mañana"). In 1995, he was part of the compilation album Boleros: Por Amor y Desamor written and produced by Jorge Avendaño, recording "Vuélveme a Querer", which hit No. 2 on the Hot Latin Tracks (held off by Enrique Iglesias' debut single Si Tú Te Vas). In 1996, Cristian released El Deseo De Oir Tu Voz (The Wish to Hear Your Voice) which featured hits such as "Morelia", "Amor", "Amarte a Ti", and the title track. At the 9th Lo Nuestro Awards, Castro received a nomination for Male Pop Artist of the Year. Cristian has also done opening themes for telenovelas such as Morelia (1994), Ángela (1998) and Mujer De Madera (Woman of Wood) (2004).

=== 1997–2004: BMG years ===
In 1997, Castro left Fonovisa and signed with BMG, which released Lo Mejor De Mi. Pianist Raúl Di Blasio played on "Después De Tí...¿Qué?" ("After You...What?"). The album was nominated Best Latin Pop Album of the Year. Following the album's success, Castro sang duets with Olga Tañón, Grupo Límite, and José Alfredo Jiménez. In 1999 he released Mi Vida Sin Tu Amor, which had four singles in the top ten of the Billboard Hot Latin Tracks chart. ("Alguna Vez" No. 2, "Por Amarte Asi" No. 3, "Mi Vida Sin Tu Amor" No. 3, and "Volver a Amar" No. 4). In 2001, he released Azul, which won Best Latin Pop Album of the Year. In 2002, he sang a duet with Irish boy band Westlife in the song "Flying Without Wings". In 2005, he released Galltio Feliz, a collection of his childhood songs, Nunca Voy A Olvidarte...Los Exitos, a greatest hits album featuring both Fonovisa and BMG songs.

=== 2005–2012: Universal Music Latino years ===
In 2005, Castro released Días Felices with "Amor Eterno" and "Sin Tu Amor" as the album hit under the Universal Music Latino label. In 2006, Castro contributed to a tribute to Víctor Yturbe "El Piruli" in which he sang "Mil Besos". On 26 June 2007, he released his first mariachi album, El Indomable, which was produced by Vicente Fernández, and released the single "Tu Retirada".

Castro announced that the divorce with Valeria led him to bankruptcy. The album El culpable soy yo was released on 28 April 2009. He sang at the Latin Grammy Celebra José José ceremony. On 28 September 2010, he released the single "La Nave del Olvido" and "Amor, Amor" as part of Viva el Príncipe, his tribute album to José José. In 2011, a follow-up to Viva el príncipe was recorded under the title Mi Amigo El Príncipe.

=== 2012–present: Primera Fila and Sony Music ===
After disappointing sales of albums with Universal Latin Entertainment, Castro signed with Sony Music. For his first album with Sony since Hoy Quiero Soñar, Castro recorded a live album titled Primera Fila : Día 1 which contains live recordings of his well-known songs as well as original songs. The album features collaborations by several performers, including Reik, Ha*Ash, Leonel García and Verónica Castro. The album it was released under the label Sony Music Latin on 2 April 2013.

== Personal life ==
Castro has been living in Argentina since 2020. He was married to model Gabriela Bo from Paraguay. After he divorced Bo, he married his Argentine Jewish ex-girlfriend, Valeria Liberman. Castro converted to Judaism upon marrying Liberman. He has since reverted to Roman Catholicism following his divorce from Liberman after being seen in public with Divinamaruuu's sister, Celeste Rifai. He resides in Punta del Este, Uruguay, and Mexico City. Castro was diagnosed with autism as a child.

== Discography ==
=== Solo ===
Studio albums

- Agua Nueva (1992)
- Un Segundo en el Tiempo (1993)
- El Camino del Alma (1994)
- El Deseo de Oír Tu Voz (1996)
- Lo Mejor de Mí (1997)
- Mi Vida Sin Tu Amor (1999)
- Azul (2001)
- Amar Es (2003)
- Hoy Quiero Soñar (2004)
- Días Felices (2005)
- El Indomable (2007)
- El Culpable Soy Yo (2009)
- Viva el Príncipe (2010)
- Mi Amigo El Príncipe (2011)
- Dicen (2016)
- Mi Tributo a Juan Gabriel (2018)

Live albums

- En Primera Fila: Dia 1 (2013)
- En Primera Fila: Dia 2 (2014)

Collaborations

- 1981 "Juntos Vamos a Volar" (feat. Verónica Castro)
- 1997 "Después De Ti... ¿Qué?" (feat. Raúl Di Blasio)
- 1998 "Ella" (feat. José Alfredo Jiménez)
- 1998 "Escondidos" (feat. Olga Tañón)
- 1998 "Pasión" (feat. Grupo Límite)
- 2002 "El Día Que Te Conocí" (feat. Armando Manzanero)
- 2002 "Flying without Wings" (feat. Westlife)
- 2005 "Mil Besos" (feat. Victor Yturbe El Piruli)
- 2006 "Después De Ti... ¿qué?" (feat. José Feliciano)
- 2006 "El Poder De Ka Música" en Vivo (feat. Juan Maaah)
- 2007 "Golondrina Presumida" (feat. Vicente Fernandez)
- 2007 "Morena De Ojos Negros" (feat. Vicente Fernandez)
- 2007 "Nada Sin Tu Amor" (feat. Tamara)
- 2008 "Es Amor" (feat. Yanni)
- 2008 "La Fuerza Del Destino" (feat. Yanni)
- 2008 "Que Voy a Hacer Conmigo" (feat. Cesar Franco)
- 2009 "Como Todos" (feat. Douglas)
- 2009 "El Culpable Soy Yo" Remix (feat. R.K.M & Ken-Y)
- 2009 "No Me Digas" Remix (feat. Jayko "El Prototipo")
- 2010 "Lo Pasado, Pasado" (feat. José José)
- 2010 "Por Amarte Así" (feat. Ana Isabelle)
- 2011 "Buenos Días Amor" (feat. Karlos Rose)
- 2011 "Todo en Tu Vida" (feat. Myriam Hernández)
- 2012 "Abre Tus Brazos" (feat. Gigi D'Alessio)
- 2012 "Amarte Ha Sido Tan Facil" (feat. Henry Santos)
- 2012 "Besos Violentos" (feat. Enanitos Verdes)
- 2012 "Cómo La Flor" (feat. Selena)
- 2013 "Aprendí a Llorar/Ven" (feat. Veronica Castro)
- 2013 "Así Era Ella" Electro Mambo Remix (feat. Elvis Crespo)
- 2013 "Es Mejor Así" (feat. Reik)
- 2013 "Luces De Nueva York" (feat. La Sonora Santanera)
- 2013 "Para Empezar" (feat. Leonel García)
- 2013 "Te Amaré Más Allá" (feat. Ha*Ash)
- 2014 "Enamorado De Ti Para Siempre" (feat. Aleks Syntek)
- 2014 "Lloran Las Rosas" (feat. Jorge Celedon Y Jimmy Zambrano)
- 2014 "No Podrás" (feat. Benny Ibarra)
- 2014 "Quiéreme" (feat. Genitallica & Coda)
- 2014 "Recuerdas" (feat. Leonel García)
- 2014 "Tan Cerquita" (feat. Aleks Syntek)
- 2015 "Entre la Espada y la Pared" (feat. Agrupación Cariño)
- 2016 "Destilando Amor" (feat. Aarón Y Su Grupo Ilusión)
- 2016 "Fruto Robado" (feat. La Sonora Santanera)
- 2016 "Me Gustas Mucho" (feat. Rocio Durcal)
- 2016 "Recuerdos" (feat. Edith Márquez)
- 2017 "Como un Duende" (feat. Los Baby's)
- 2017 "De Cigarro en Cigarro" (feat. Charlie Zaa)
- 2017 "Fuerza México")
- 2017 "Nunca Voy a Olvidarte" (feat. Bronco)
- 2018 "Despedida" (feat. Beatriz Luengo)
- 2018 "Qué Mal Amada Estás" (feat. Roberto Cantoral)
- 2018 "Rosa Rosa" (feat. Sandro)
- 2018 "Vida" (feat. La Mafia)
- 2019 "Ahora Mismo" (feat. Maxi Pardo)
- 2020 "Resistiré México" (among Artists for Mexico)

== Filmography ==
=== Films ===
- Mulan (voz, 1998)

=== Telenovelas ===
- Las secretas intenciones (1992) – Miguel Ángel Curiel
- Mi segunda madre (1989) – Rubén
- Herencia maldita (1986) – Armando Rojas (niño)
- El derecho de nacer (1981) – Alberto Limonta (child)

=== Series ===
- Run Coyote Run (2018) Season 2 -Cristian Castro

=== TV ===
- Canta Conmigo Ahora (2022) Judge
- ¿Quién es la máscara? (2022)

== See also ==
- List of best-selling Latin music artists
- List of awards and nominations received by Cristian Castro
