= Luis Fonsi discography =

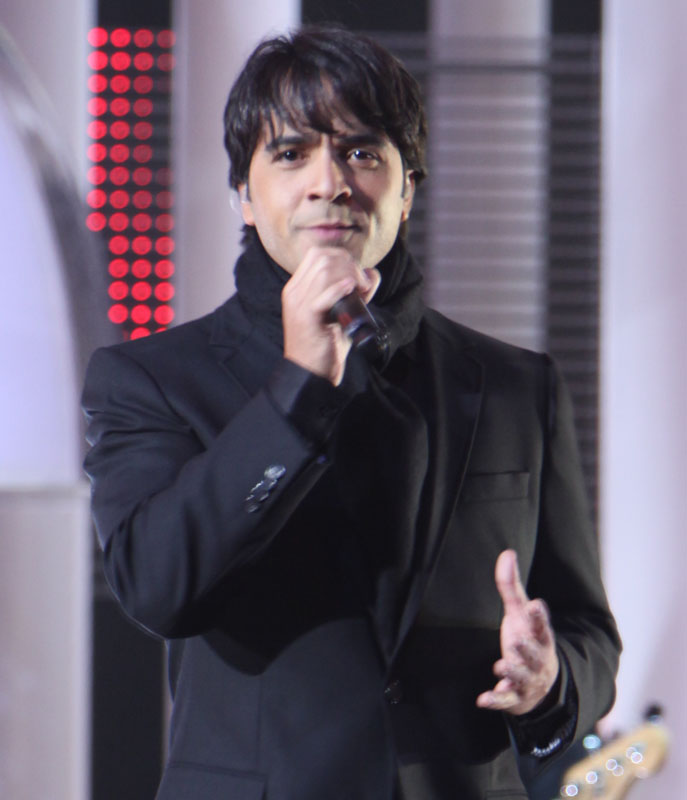
- Fonsi in 2009
- Studio albums: 12
- Compilation albums: 5
- Singles: 59
- Video albums: 2
- Music videos: 50

Puerto Rican singer Luis Fonsi has released 12 studio albums, 5 compilation albums, 59 singles and 2 DVDs.

== Albums ==
=== Studio albums ===
Title	Details	Peak chart positions					Certifications
Title	Details	US	US Lat	US Pop	SPA	MEX	Certifications
Comenzaré	Released: September 15, 1998; Label: Universal Music Latino; Format: CD	—	27	12	—	—	RIAA: Platinum (Latin)
Eterno	Released: June 20, 2000; Label: Universal Music Latino; Format: CD	—	6	2	42	—	RIAA: Platinum (Latin)
Amor Secreto	Released: March 12, 2002; Label: Universal Music Latino; Format: CD	109	1	1	45	—	RIAA: Platinum (Latin)
Fight the Feeling	Released: July 2, 2002; Label: MCA Records; Format: CD	—	—	—	—	—	
Abrazar la Vida	Released: October 28, 2003; Label: Universal Music Latino; Formats: CD, digital download	138	3	3	87	—	RIAA: Platinum (Latin)
Paso a Paso	Released: July 12, 2005; Label: Universal Music Latino; Formats: CD, digital download	62	2	2	7	—	RIAA: Platinum (Latin); PROMUSICAE: Gold
Palabras del Silencio	Released: August 26, 2008; Label: Universal Music Latino; Formats: CD, digital download	15	1	1	2	9	RIAA: Platinum (Latin); AMPROFON: Gold; PROMUSICAE: Platinum
Tierra Firme	Released: June 28, 2011; Label: Universal Music Latino; Formats: CD, digital download	56	1	1	1	1	
8	Released: May 19, 2014; Label: Universal Music Latino; Formats: CD, digital download	60	2	2	4	—	
Vida	Released: February 1, 2019; Label: Universal Music Latino; Formats: CD, digital download	18	1	1	1	—	RIAA: 22× Platinum (Latin); PROMUSICAE: Gold
Ley de Gravedad	Released: March 11, 2022; Label: Universal Music Latino; Formats: CD, digital download	—	27	5	8	—	
El Viaje	Released: May 17, 2024; Label: Universal Music Latino; Formats: CD, digital download	—	—	15	14	—	
"—" denotes an album that did not chart or was not released.

=== Compilation albums ===
Title	Details	Peak chart positions					Certifications
Title	Details	US Lat	US Pop	POL	SPA	SWI	Certifications
Éxitos 98:06	Released: November 21, 2006; Label: Universal Music Latino; Formats: CD, digital download	11	7	—	34	—	
6 Super Hits	Released: November 17, 2009; Label: Universal Music Latino; Formats: CD, digital download	34	9	—	—	—	
Romances	Released: January 29, 2013; Label: Universal Music Latino; Formats: CD, digital download	41	15	—	—	—	
2En1	Released: February 17, 2017; Label: Universal Music Latino; Formats: CD, digital download	—	—	—	—	—	
Despacito & Mis Grandes Éxitos	Released: June 16, 2017; Label: MCA; Formats: CD, digital download	—	—	26	—	14	ZPAV: Gold
"—" denotes an album that did not chart or was not released.

=== Remix albums ===
Title	Details
Remixes	Released: April 17, 2001; Label: Universal Music Latino; Format: CD

== Singles ==
=== As lead artist ===
Title	Year	Peak chart positions										Certifications	Album
Title	Year	US	US Lat.	AUS	CAN	FRA	MEX	SPA	SWE	SWI	UK	Certifications	Album
"Dime Como"	1998	—	23	—	—	—	—	—	—	—	—		Comenzaré
"Perdóname"	1998	—	17	—	—	—	—	—	—	—	—		Comenzaré
"Si Tú Quisieras"	1999	—	9	—	—	—	—	—	—	—	—		Comenzaré
"Me Iré"	1999	—	19	—	—	—	—	—	—	—	—		Comenzaré
"Imagíname Sin Ti"	2000	—	1	—	—	—	—	—	—	—	—		Eterno
"No Te Cambio Por Ninguna"	2000	—	28	—	—	—	—	—	—	—	—		Eterno
"Mi Sueño"	2001	—	27	—	—	—	—	—	—	—	—		Eterno
"Eterno"	2001	—	— (Note: The song did not rank on the Hot Latin Songs chart but peaked at 34 on the Billboard Latin Pop Songs chart.)	—	—	—	—	—	—	—	—		Eterno
"Sería Fácil"	2001	—	— (Note: The song did not rank on the Hot Latin Songs chart but peaked at 27 on the Billboard Latin Pop Songs chart.)	—	—	—	—	—	—	—	—		Eterno
"Quisiera Poder Olvidarme de Ti"	2002	—	3	—	—	—	—	—	—	—	—		Amor Secreto
"Amor Secreto"	2002	—	35	—	—	—	—	—	—	—	—		Amor Secreto
"Te Vas"	2002	—	25	—	—	—	—	—	—	—	—		Amor Secreto
"Secret"	2002	—	—	—	—	—	—	—	—	—	—		Fight the Feeling
"¿Quién Te Dijo Eso?"	2003	—	17	—	—	—	—	—	—	—	—		Abrazar la Vida
"Abrazar la Vida"	2003	—	1	—	—	—	—	—	—	—	—		Abrazar la Vida
"Por Ti Podría Morir"	2004	—	29	—	—	—	—	—	—	—	—		Abrazar la Vida
"Nada Es Para Siempre"	2005	90	1	—	—	—	—	—	—	—	—		Paso a Paso
"Estoy Perdido"	2005	—	9	—	—	—	—	—	—	—	—		Paso a Paso
"Vivo Muriendo"	2006	—	— (Note: The song did not rank on the Hot Latin Songs chart but peaked at 22 on the Billboard Latin Pop Songs chart.)	—	—	—	—	—	—	—	—		Paso a Paso
"Por Una Mujer"	2006	—	16	—	—	—	—	—	—	—	—		Paso a Paso
"Paso a Paso"	2006	—	— (Note: The song did not rank on the Hot Latin Songs chart but peaked at 32 on the Billboard Latin Pop Songs chart.)	—	—	—	—	—	—	—	—		Paso a Paso
"Tu Amor"	2006	—	1	—	—	—	—	—	—	—	—		Éxitos 98:06
"No Me Doy Por Vencido"	2008	92	1	—	—	—	—	5	—	—	—	PROMUSICAE: 2× Platinum	Palabras del Silencio
"Aquí Estoy Yo" (featuring Aleks Syntek, David Bisbal, and Noel Schajris)	2008	—	1	—	—	—	—	9	—	—	—	PROMUSICAE: Gold	Palabras del Silencio
"Llueve Por Dentro"	2009	—	33	—	—	—	—	—	—	—	—		Palabras del Silencio
"Aunque Estés Con El"	2009	—	41	—	—	—	—	—	—	—	—		Palabras del Silencio
"Gritar"	2011	—	11	—	—	—	—	24	—	—	—		Tierra Firme
"Respira"	2012	—	13	—	—	—	21	—	—	—	—		Tierra Firme
"Claridad"	2012	—	30	—	—	—	36	—	—	—	—		Tierra Firme
"Nunca Digas Siempre"	2012	—	—	—	—	—	—	13	—	—	—		Tierra Firme
"Corazón En La Maleta"	2014	—	21	—	—	—	35	13	—	—	—		8
"Llegaste Tú" (featuring Juan Luis Guerra)	2014	—	— (Note: The song did not rank on the Hot Latin Songs chart but peaked at 6 on the Billboard Latin Pop Songs chart.)	—	—	—	28	—	—	—	—		8
"Que Quieres de Mí"	2014	—	46	—	—	—	—	—	—	—	—		8
"Tentación"	2015	—	—	—	—	—	—	—	—	—	—		8
"Despacito" (featuring Daddy Yankee or with Daddy Yankee featuring Justin Bieber)	2017	1	1	1	1	1	1	1	1	1	1	AFP: 5× Platinum; AMPROFON: 5× Diamond+4× Platinum+Gold; ARIA: 11× Platinum; BPI: 7× Platinum; GLF: 13× Platinum; IFPI SWI: Platinum; MC: Diamond; PROMUSICAE: 13× Platinum; RIAA: 13× Platinum; RIAA: 141× Platinum (Latin); SNEP: Diamond	Vida
"Kissing Strangers (Remix)" (with DNCE featuring Nicki Minaj)	2017	—	—	—	—	—	—	—	—	—	—		Non-album single
"Échame la Culpa" (with Demi Lovato)	2017	47	3	80	35	3	19	1	6	2	46	AMPROFON: Diamond; BPI: Silver; GLF: 2× Platinum; MC: Platinum; PROMUSICAE: 4× Platinum; RIAA: 3× Platinum (Latin); SNEP: Diamond	Vida
"Calypso" (with Stefflon Don or Karol G)	2018	—	11	—	—	—	—	6	92	12	—	AMPROFON: Platinum; PROMUSICAE: 2× Platinum	Vida
"Sigamos Bailando" (with Gianluca Vacchi featuring Yandel)	2018	—	—	—	—	—	—	—	—	—	—		Non-album singles
"Pa' La Calle (with Coastcity)	2018	—	—	—	—	—	—	—	—	—	—		Non-album singles
"Imposible" (with Ozuna)	2018	— (Note: "Imposible" did not enter the Billboard Hot 100, but peaked at number 10 on the Bubbling Under Hot 100 chart.)	9	—	—	—	—	4	—	17	—	PROMUSICAE: 2× Platinum	Vida
"Sola"	2019	—	35	—	—	—	—	22	—	38	—		Vida
"Right Where I'm Supposed to Be (Official Song of the Special Olympic World Games Abu Dhabi 2019)" (with Ryan Tedder, Avril Lavigne, Hussain Al Jassmi, Assala Nasri and Tamer Hosny)	2019	—	—	—	—	—	—	—	—	—	—		Non-album single
"Date La Vuelta" (with Sebastián Yatra and Nicky Jam)	2019	—	31	—	—	—	—	23	—	27	—	PROMUSICAE: Platinum	Ley de Gravedad
"Pa' Lante" (with Alex Sensation and Anitta)	2019	—	— (Note: "Pa' Lante" did not enter the Billboard Hot Latin Songs chart, but peaked at number 45 on the Billboard Latin Airplay chart.)	—	—	—	—	—	—	—	—		Non-album singles
"16" (with Kurt)	2019	—	—	—	—	—	—	—	—	—	—		Non-album singles
"Tanto" (with Jesse & Joy)	2019	—	2	—	—	—	5	—	—	—	—	RIAA: 2× Platinum (Latin)	Non-album singles
"Sway" (Songland)	2020	— (Note: "Sway" did not enter the Billboard Hot 100, but peaked at number 11 on the Digital Songs chart.)	—	—	—	—	—	—	—	—	—		Non-album singles
"The World Can Wait" (with Paul Oakenfold)	2020	—	—	—	—	—	—	—	—	—	—		Non-album singles
"Perfecta" (with Farruko)	2020	—	30	—	—	—	—	—	—	—	—		Ley de Gravedad
"Vacío" (with Rauw Alejandro)	2021	—	—	—	—	—	—	41	—	—	—	PROMUSICAE: Gold	Ley de Gravedad
"Pues" (with R3hab and Sean Paul)	2021	—	—	—	—	—	—	—	—	—	—		Non-album singles
"Bésame" (with Myke Towers)	2021	—	—	—	—	—	—	11	—	—	—	RIAA: Platinum (Latin); PROMUSICAE: Platinum	Ley de Gravedad
"Yo No Te Olvido" (with Cali Y El Dandee)	2021	—	—	—	—	—	—	—	—	—	—		Non-album singles
"Un Ratito" (with Alok and Lunay featuring Lenny Tavárez and Juliette)	2022	—	—	—	—	—	—	—	—	—	—		Non-album singles
"Bora Bora" (with Abraham Mateo)	2023	—	—	—	—	—	—	—	—	—	—		Non-album singles
"Buenos Aires"	2023	—	—	—	—	—	—	—	—	—	—		El Viaje
"Roma" (with Laura Pausini)	2024	—	—	—	—	—	—	—	—	—	—		El Viaje
"Cambiaré" (with Feid)	2026	—	—	—	—	—	—	71	—	—	—		Non-album singles
"—" denotes a single that did not chart or has not yet been released.

=== As featured artist ===
Title	Year	Peak chart positions			Album
Title	Year	MEX Esp.	SPA	UK	Album
"Quién Como Tú" (Lucero featuring Luis Fonsi)	2015	32	—	—	Aquí Estoy
"Wave Your Flag" (Afrojack featuring Luis Fonsi)	2017	—	—	—	Non-album single
"Baby" (Clean Bandit featuring Marina and Luis Fonsi)	2018	—	—	15	What Is Love?
"Per le strade una canzone" (Eros Ramazzotti featuring Luis Fonsi)	2019	—	—	—	Vita ce n'è / Hay vida
"Dos veces" (David Bisbal featuring Luis Fonsi)	2021	—	79	—	20 Años Contigo
"Vamos a Marte" (Helene Fischer featuring Luis Fonsi)	2021	—	—	—	Rausch
"Que Será Será (Law Nebka Sawa)" (Hiba Tawaji featuring Luis Fonsi)	2022	—	—	—	Non-album single
"Corazones Rotos" (Lola Índigo featuring Luis Fonsi)	2023	—	41	—	El Dragon
"—" denotes a single that did not chart or was not released.

== Other charted songs ==
Title	Year	Peak chart positions	Album
Title	Year	US Lat.	Album
"Si No Te Hubiera Conocido" (Christina Aguilera featuring Luis Fonsi)	2000	36	Mi Reflejo

== Guest appearances ==
These songs have not appeared on a studio album by Fonsi.

Title	Year	Album	Notes
"Si No Te Hubiera Conocido"	2000	Mi Reflejo	Performed with Christina Aguilera
"Come As You Are"	2000	Crystal Clear	Performed with Jaci Velasquez
"Quien Diria"	2002	Sobrevivir	Performed with Olga Tañón
"Perdóname"	2003	Bustamante (Edicion Especial)	Performed with David Bustamante
"Amazing"	2004	Free Me	Performed with Emma Bunton
"Lamento Borincano"	2006	José Feliciano y Amigos	Performed with José Feliciano
"Historia de un Amor"	2006	Reunidos por Siempre	Performed with Víctor Yturbe
"Yo Te Quiero (Remix)"	2007	Los Vaqueros Wild Wild Mixes	Performed with Wisin & Yandel
"Noelia"	2009	Nino Bravo – 40 Años Con Nino	Tribute song
"Mucho Corazón"	2009	Ni Antes Ni Después	Performed with Armando Manzanero
"Que Cante la Vida"	2010	Non-album single	Charity single performed with various artists
"Una Oportunidad"	2010	Non-album single	Performed with Daddy Yankee
"Per le strade una canzone"	2018	Vita ce n'è	Performed with Eros Ramazzotti
"Por las calles las canciones"	2018	Hay Vida	Performed with Eros Ramazzotti

== Other collaborations ==
Title	Year
"Nada Es Para Siempre" (Reggaeton Version) (featuring Adassa)	2005
"Estoy Perdido" (Don Candiani Reggaeton Remix) (featuring Taino and Flaco)	2005
"Tu Amor" (Remix) (featuring Arcángel)	2006
"No Me Doy Por Vencido" (Urban Remix) (featuring MJ)	2008
"No Me Doy Por Vencido" (Banda Version) (featuring German Montero)	2008
"Aquí Estoy Yo" (Urban Remix) (featuring Yomo)	2009
"Gritar" (Banda Version) (featuring Banda el Recodo)	2011
"Gritar" (Remix) (featuring J Alvarez)	2011
"Respira" (Remix) (featuring Angel & Khriz)	2011
"Despacito" (Salsa Version) (featuring Víctor Manuelle)	2017
"Despacito" (Mandarin Version) (featuring JJ Lin)	2018

== Music videos ==
Year	Title	Album
1998	"Perdóname"	Comenzaré
1999	"Si tú quisieras"	Comenzaré
2000	"Imagíname sin ti"	Eterno
2000	"No te cambio por ninguna"	Eterno
2000	"Mi sueño"	Eterno
2002	"Quisiera poder olvidarme de ti"	Amor secreto
2002	"Amor secreto"/"Secret"	Amor secreto/Fight the Feeling
2003	"¿Quién te dijo eso?"	Abrazar la vida
2003	"Abrazar la vida"	Abrazar la vida
2005	"Nada es para siempre"	Paso a paso
2005	"Estoy perdido"	Paso a paso
2005	"Por una mujer"	Paso a paso
2006	"Tu amor"	Éxitos 98:06
2008	"No me doy por vencido"	Palabras del silencio
2008	"Aquí estoy yo" (with Aleks Syntek, Noel Schajris and David Bisbal)	Palabras del silencio
2009	"Aunque estés con él"	Palabras del silencio
2011	"Gritar"	Tierra firme
2011	"Respira"	Tierra firme
2011	"Claridad"	Tierra firme
2014	"Corazón en la maleta"	8
2014	"Llegaste tú" (with Juan Luis Guerra)	8
2014	"¿Qué quieres de mí?"	8
2016	"Despacito" (with Daddy Yankee)	Vida
2017	"Échame la culpa" (with Demi Lovato)	Vida
2018	"Calypso" (with Stefflon Don)	Vida
2018	"Imposible" (with Ozuna)	Vida
2018	"Sola" (English and Spanish versions)	Vida
2019	"Date la vuelta" (with Sebastián Yatra and Nicky Jam)	Ley de gravedad
2020	"Girasoles"	Ley de gravedad
2020	"Perfecta" (with Farruko)	Ley de gravedad
2021	"Vacío" (2 versions) (with Rauw Alejandro)	Ley de gravedad
2021	"Bésame" (with Myke Towers)	Ley de gravedad
2021	"Nuestra balada"	Ley de gravedad
2021	"Vacaciones" (with Manuel Turizo)	Ley de gravedad
2022	"Ley de gravedad" (with Cali y El Dandee)	Ley de gravedad
2022	"Dolce"	Ley de gravedad
2022	"Vacaciones" (Acoustic version) (with Manuel Turizo)	non-album
2023	"Buenos Aires"	El viaje
2023	"Pasa la página - Panamá"	El viaje
2023	"Santiago"	El viaje
2024	"La Romana"	El viaje
2024	"La paz" (with Adriel Favela)	Zorro soundtrack
2024	"Mabella" (with Omar Montes)	El viaje
2024	"Roma" (with Laura Pausini)	El viaje
2024	"Santa Marta" (with Carlos Vives)	El viaje
2024	"City of Dreams"	non-album
2025	"Tocando el cielo"	non-album
