= Love + Dance World Tour =

2017–18 concert tour by Luis Fonsi

- Tour by Luis Fonsi
- Associated album: "Despacito" & Mis Grandes Éxitos
- Start date: July 1, 2017
- End date: July 26, 2018
- Legs: 5
- No. of shows: 92

Luis Fonsi concert chronology
- Somos Uno Tour (2014–15); Love + Dance World Tour (2017–18); Vida World Tour (2019)

The Love + Dance World Tour is the ninth concert tour by Puerto Rican singer Luis Fonsi, in support of his worldwide hit single, "Despacito" (2017). The tour began on July 1, 2017, in Andújar, Spain, and concluded on July 26, 2018, in Marbella, Spain.

== Background ==
Fonsi announced the tour after his performance of "Despacito" at Late Night with Conan O'Brien on June 12, 2017. The American leg of the tour will take Fonsi to major markets, including Los Angeles, Chicago, Atlanta and Las Vegas, with more cities and dates to be announced. The tour began on July 1 in Spain.

== Opening acts ==
- Karol G (United States—selected dates)

== Set list ==
This set list is representative of the concert on July 1, 2017. It does not represent all concerts for the duration of the tour.

1. "Tanto Para Nada"
2. "Corazon En La Maleta"
3. "Nada Es Para Siempre"
4. "Imaginame Sin Ti"
5. "Apaga la Luz"
6. "Gritar"
7. "Llegaste Tú"
8. "¿Quién Te Dijo Eso?"
9. "Por Una Mujer"
10. "Llueve Por Dentro"
11. "Échame la Culpa"
12. "Se Supone"
13. "Yo Te Propongo"
14. "Aún Te Amo" / "Que Quieres de Mí" / "Abrazar la Vida" / "Aunque Estes con Él" / "Respira"
15. "No Me Doy por Vencido"
16. "Aquí Estoy Yo"
17. "Despacito"

== Tour dates ==
List of concerts, showing date, city, country, venue, opening acts, tickets sold, number of available tickets and amount of gross revenue
Date	City	Country	Venue	Attendance	Revenue
Europe
July 1, 2017	Andújar	Spain	Campo de Futbol de La Safa	—	—
July 6, 2017	Huelva	Spain	Foro Iberoamericano de La Rábida	—	—
July 8, 2017	Palma	Spain	Plaza de Toros de Palma	—	—
July 10, 2017	Laguna de Duero	Spain	Estadio Municipal de Laguna	—	—
July 11, 2017	Gijón	Spain	Palacio de Deportes de Gijón	—	—
July 13, 2017	Murcia	Spain	Plaza de Toros de Murcia	—	—
July 14, 2017	Valencia	Spain	Auditorio Marina Sur	—	—
July 15, 2017	Benidorm	Spain	Plaza de Toros de Benidorm	—	—
July 18, 2017	Lisbon	Portugal	Campo Pequeno Bullring	—	—
July 19, 2017	Gondomar	Portugal	Pavilhão Multiusos de Gondomar	—	—
July 21, 2017	Las Palmas	Spain	Anexo Estadio Gran Canaria	—	—
July 22, 2017	Tenerife	Spain	Parking del Parque Marítimo	—	—
July 23, 2017	La Palma	Spain	Recinto Portuario	—	—
July 25, 2017	Vigo	Spain	Instituto Ferial de Vigo	—	—
July 27, 2017	Santander	Spain	Campa de la Magdalena	—	—
July 28, 2017 (Note: The concert on July 28, 2017, in Lucca is part of the 2017 Lucca Summer Festival.)	Lucca	Italy	Piazza Napoleone	—N/a	—N/a
July 30, 2017	Madrid	Spain	Teatro Real	—	—
July 31, 2017	Ibiza	Spain	Recinto Ferial de Ibiza	—	—
August 2, 2017 (Note: The concert on August 2, 2017, in Marbella is part of the Starlite Festival.)	Marbella	Spain	Starlite Auditorium	—N/a	—N/a
August 3, 2017	Sanlúcar	Spain	Teatro Municipal de Sanlúcar	—	—
August 5, 2017 (Note: The concert on August 5, 2017, in Palafrugell is part of the 2017 Cap Roig Festival.)	Palafrugell	Spain	Jardins de Cap Roig	—N/a	—N/a
August 6, 2017 (Note: The concert on August 6, 2017, in Salou is part of the 2017 Nits Daurades de Salou.)	Salou	Spain	Plaça de les Comunitats Autònomes	—N/a	—N/a
August 7, 2017	Budapest	Hungary	Budapest Park	—	—
August 10, 2017 (Note: The concert on August 10, 2017, in Ayia Napa is part of the 2017 Beach Cult Live Music Festival.)	Ayia Napa	Cyprus	Makronissos Beach Club	—	—
Africa
August 11, 2017	North Coast	Egypt	ARCO Al Sahel Oasis	—	—
Europe
August 12, 2017	Stockholm	Sweden	Ericsson Globe	—	—
August 13, 2017	Bodrum	Turkey	Palmalife Bodrum Resort	—	—
South America
August 20, 2017	La Rioja	Argentina	Superdomo	—	—
August 21, 2017 (Note: The concert on August 21, 2017, in Dolores is part of the celebrations for the Dolores Bicentennial.)	Dolores	Argentina	Plaza Castelli	—N/a	—N/a
August 23, 2017	Mendoza	Argentina	Sancor Seguros Arena	—	—
August 25, 2017	Córdoba	Argentina	Orfeo Superdomo	—	—
August 26, 2017	Rosario	Argentina	City Center Rosario	—	—
August 28, 2017	Tucumán	Argentina	Estadio Central Córdoba	—	—
August 29, 2017	Salta	Argentina	Microestadio Delmi	—	—
August 30, 2017	Corrientes	Argentina	Club Juventus	—	—
September 1, 2017	Buenos Aires	Argentina	Estadio Luna Park	—	—
September 2, 2017	Buenos Aires	Argentina	Estadio Luna Park	—	—
September 3, 2017	Buenos Aires	Argentina	Estadio Luna Park	—	—
North America
September 8, 2017	Las Vegas	United States	Pearl Concert Theater	—	—
September 9, 2017	Los Angeles	United States	Wiltern Theatre	—	—
September 10, 2017	Phoenix	United States	Comerica Theatre	—	—
September 13, 2017	El Paso	United States	Abraham Chavez Theatre	—	—
September 15, 2017	Irving	United States	The Pavilion	—	—
September 16, 2017	San Antonio	United States	Majestic Theatre	—	—
September 17, 2017	Sugar Land	United States	Smart Financial Centre	—	—
September 20, 2017	Clearwater	United States	Ruth Eckerd Hall	—	—
September 22, 2017	Hollywood	United States	Hard Rock Live Arena	—	—
September 23, 2017	Orlando	United States	Hard Rock Live	—	—
September 24, 2017	Atlanta	United States	Roxy Theatre	—	—
September 26, 2017	Rosemont	United States	Rosemont Theatre	—	—
September 28, 2017	New York City	United States	Kings Theatre	—	—
September 29, 2017	Ledyard	United States	Fox Theater	—	—
September 30, 2017	Atlantic City	United States	Circus Maximus	—	—
South America
October 4, 2017	Lima	Peru	Jockey Club	—	—
October 6, 2017	Temuco	Chile	Gimnasio La Salle	—	—
October 7, 2017	Concepción	Chile	Gimnasio Municipal de Concepción	—	—
October 9, 2017	Viña del Mar	Chile	Enjoy Viña del Mar	—	—
October 12, 2017	Santiago	Chile	Movistar Arena	—	—
October 13, 2017	Santiago	Chile	Movistar Arena	—	—
October 14, 2017	Antofagasta	Chile	Estadio Sokol	—	—
October 15, 2017	Coquimbo	Chile	Enjoy Coquimbo	—	—
Europe
November 19, 2017	Moscow	Russia	Stadium Live Club	—	—
November 22, 2017	Riga	Latvia	Arēna Rīga	—	—
November 24, 2017	Belgrade	Serbia	Kombank Arena	—	—
December 1, 2017	Rome	Italy	Cinecittà World	—	—
December 3, 2017	Oberhausen	Germany	Turbinenhalle Oberhausen	—	—
December 4, 2017	Amsterdam	Netherlands	AFAS Live	—	—
Asia
December 6, 2017	Doha	Qatar	W Doha	—	—
Latin America
December 17, 2017 (Note: The concert on December 17, 2017, in La Plata was a benefit concert titled "Puerto Rico y Argentina se abrazan".)	La Plata	Argentina	Republic of the Children	—N/a	—N/a
February 6, 2018 (Note: The concert on February 6, 2018, in Córdoba is part of the 2018 Festival de Villa María.)	Villa María	Argentina	Anfiteatro de Villa María	—N/a	—N/a
February 17, 2018 (Note: The concert on February 17, 2018, in El Calafate is part of the 2018 Fiesta Nacional del Lago.)	El Calafate	Argentina	Anfiteatro del Bosque	—N/a	—N/a
February 19, 2018	Rosario	Argentina	City Center Rosario	—	—
February 21, 2018 (Note: The concert on February 21, 2018, in Viña del Mar is part of the LIX Viña del Mar International Song Festival.)	Viña del Mar	Chile	Quinta Vergara Amphitheater	—N/a	—N/a
February 27, 2018	Montevideo	Uruguay	Centro de Espectáculos Landia	—	—
March 7, 2018	Monterrey	Mexico	Auditorio Pabellón M	—	—
March 9, 2018	Torreón	Mexico	Coliseo Centenario	—	—
March 10, 2018	Tijuana	Mexico	Plaza Monumental	—	—
March 11, 2018	Mexicali	Mexico	Plaza Del Toros	—	—
March 14, 2018	Guadalajara	Mexico	Telmex Auditorium	—	—
March 16, 2018	Mexico City	Mexico	Auditorio Nacional	—	—
March 17, 2018	Cancún	Mexico	Plaza de Toros de Cancún	—	—
March 18, 2018	Mérida	Mexico	Coliseo Yucatán	—	—
March 22, 2018	Moreila	Mexico	Plaza de Toros de Moreila	—	—
March 23, 2018	Culiacan	Mexico	Palacio de Gobierno	—	—
April 21, 2018	Panama City	Panama	Figali Convention Center	—	—
May 3, 2018	Curitiba	Brazil	Live Curitiba	—	—
May 4, 2018	São Paulo	Brazil	Espaço das Américas	—	—
May 5, 2018	Rio de Janeiro	Brazil	KM de Vantagens Hall	—	—
June 1, 2018	San Juan	Puerto Rico	José Miguel Agrelot Coliseum	—	—
June 2, 2018	San Juan	Puerto Rico	José Miguel Agrelot Coliseum	—	—
June 9, 2018	La Romana	Dominican Republic	Altos de Chavón	—	—
June 14, 2018	Quito	Ecuador	Ruminahui Coliseum	—	—
June 16, 2018	Guayaquil	Ecuador	Voltaire Paladines Polo Coliseum	—	—
Europe
July 21, 2018	Tenerife	Spain	Canarias Urban Fest		
July 23, 2018	Barcelona	Spain	Gran Teatre Del Liceu		
July 26, 2018	Marbella	Spain	Starlite Festival		
Total				—	—

== Cancelled shows ==
Date	City	Country	Venue	Reason
July 17, 2017	Pesaro	Italy	Stadio Tonino Benelli	Logistical issues
October 19, 2017	Monterrey	Mexico	Auditorio Pabellón M	2017 Puebla earthquake
October 20, 2017	Torreón	Mexico	Coliseo Centenario	2017 Puebla earthquake
October 21, 2017	San Luis Potosí	Mexico	El Domo	2017 Puebla earthquake
October 22, 2017	Morelia	Mexico	Palacio de Arte	2017 Puebla earthquake
October 24, 2017	Guadalajara	Mexico	Telmex Auditorium	2017 Puebla earthquake
October 26, 2017	Puebla City	Mexico	Acrópolis Puebla	2017 Puebla earthquake
October 27, 2017	Cancún	Mexico	Plaza de Toros de Cancún	2017 Puebla earthquake
October 28, 2017	Mérida	Mexico	Coliseo Yucatán	2017 Puebla earthquake
November 1, 2017	Mexico City	Mexico	National Auditorium	2017 Puebla earthquake
November 2, 2017	Querétaro	Mexico	Auditorio Josefa Ortiz de Domínguez	2017 Puebla earthquake
November 26, 2017	Zagreb	Croatia	Arena Zagreb	"Breakdown in communication with Fonsi’s management"
November 28, 2017	Paris	France	Zénith Paris	Unknown
