= Latin American Music Awards of 2019 =

Music Awards

5th Annual Latin American Music Award
- Date: October 17, 2019
- Location: Dolby Theatre; Los Angeles, California
- Country: United States
- Hosted by: Eugenio Derbez and Jacky Bracamontes
- Most awards: Anuel AA (5)
- Most nominations: Ozuna (9)
- Website: Telemundo-Latin American Music Awards

Television/radio coverage
- Network: Telemundo
- Produced by: Dick Clark Productions and SOMOS Productions

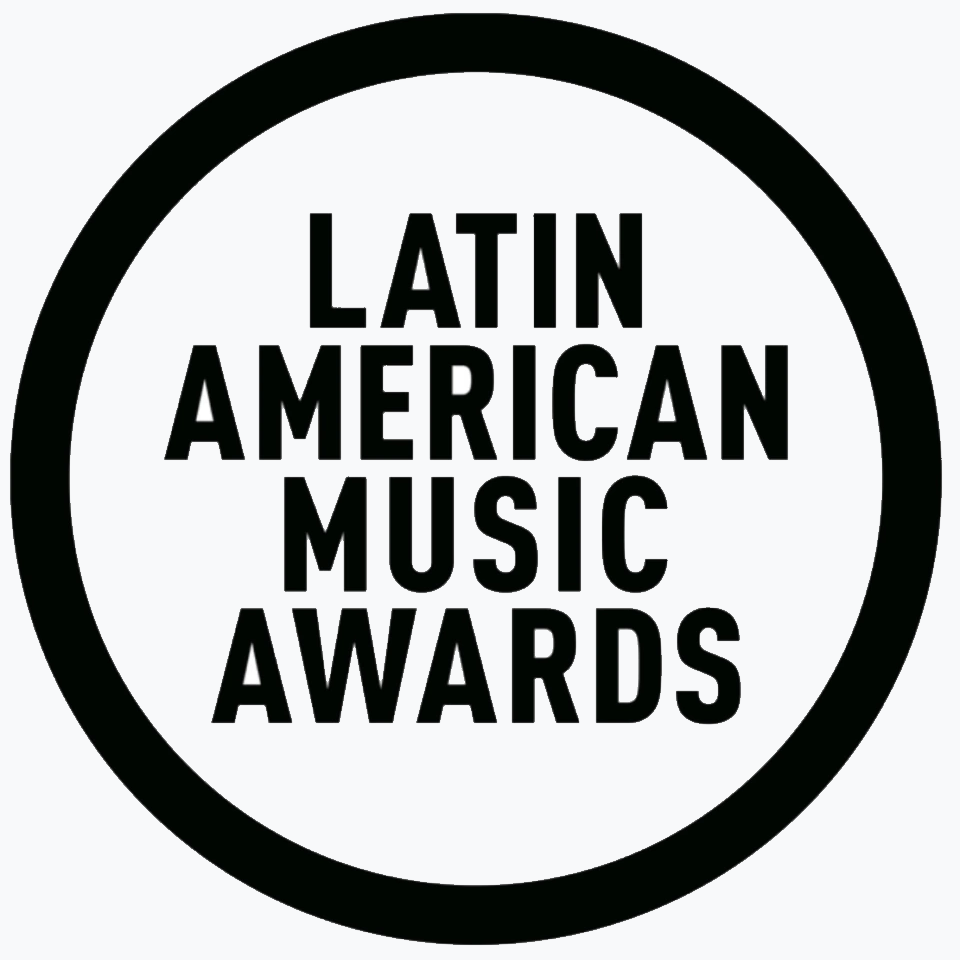
Latin American Music Awards logo since 2019

The 5th Annual Latin American Music Awards was held at the Dolby Theatre in Los Angeles, California. It was broadcast live on Telemundo. Ozuna lead the nominations with nine nods.

== Nominees and winners ==
The nominations were announced on September 4, 2019.

Artist of the Year	New Artist of the Year
Anuel AA - Winner; Bad Bunny; Banda MS de Sergio Lizárraga; Christian Nodal; Daddy Yankee; J Balvin; Karol G; Maluma; Ozuna; Romeo Santos	Lunay - Winner; Sech; Rosalía; Paulo Londra; Jhay Cortez; Darell
Song of the Year	Album of the Year
DJ Snake Feat. Selena Gomez, Ozuna & Cardi B - "Taki Taki" - Winner; Anuel AA & Romeo Santos - "Ella Quiere Beber (Remix)"; Bad Bunny (featuring Drake) - "Mia"; Daddy Yankee (featuring Snow) - "Con Calma"; Pedro Capó & Farruko - "Calma (Remix)"	Anuel AA – Real Hasta la Muerte - Winner; Bad Bunny – X 100pre; Luis Fonsi – Vida; Ozuna – Aura; Carlos Santana – Africa Speaks
Favorite Female Artist	Favorite Male Artist
Becky G - Winner; Natalia Lafourcade; Karol G; Natti Natasha; Rosalía	Anuel AA - Winner; Bad Bunny; J Balvin; Ozuna; Romeo Santos
Favorite Duo or Group	Favorite Pop/Rock Artist
CNCO - Winner; Banda Sinaloense MS de Sergio Lizárraga; Los Ángeles Azules; T3r Elemento; Wisin & Yandel	CNCO - Winner; Luis Fonsi; Pedro Capó; Sebastián Yatra
Favorite Pop/Rock Album	Favorite Pop/Rock Song
"Fantasía" – Sebastián Yatra - Winner; "Vida" – Luis Fonsi; "El mal querer" – Rosalía; "Africa Speaks" – Santana	"Ya No Tiene Novio", Sebastián Yatra Ft. Mau y Ricky. - Winner; "Lost In The Middle Of Nowhere (Remix)", Kane Brown Ft. Becky G; "Imposible", Luis Fonsi Ft. Ozuna; "Calma (Remix)", Pedro Capó & Farruko; "Amigos Con Derechos", Reik & Maluma
Favorite Regional Mexican Artist	Favorite Regional Mexican Album
Christian Nodal - Winner; Banda Sinaloense MS de Sergio Lizárraga; Calibre 50; T3r Elemento	"Oye Mujer", Raymix - Winner; "Con Todas Las Fuerzas", Banda Sinaloense MS de Sergio Lizárraga; "Bendecido", Lenin Ramírez; "The Green Trip", T3r Elemento
Favorite Regional Mexican Song	Favorite Urban Artist
"No Te Contaron Mal", Christian Nodal - Winner; "A través del vaso", Banda Los Sebastianes; "Mejor me alejo", Banda Sinaloense MS de Sergio Lizárraga; "Nunca Es Suficiente", Los Ángeles Azules Ft. Natalia Lafourcade; "Aerolínea Carrillo", T3r Elemento Ft. Gerardo Ortiz	Anuel AA - Winner; Ozuna; Bad Bunny; J Balvin
Favorite Urban Song	Favorite Urban Album
"Taki Taki", DJ Snake Feat. Selena Gomez, Ozuna & Cardi B - Winner; "Ella Quiere Beber (Remix)", Anuel AA & Romeo Santos; "MÍA", Bad Bunny & Drake; "Con Calma", Daddy Yankee & Snow; "Vaina loca", Ozuna Ft. Manuel Turizo	"Real Hasta la Muerte", Anuel AA - Winner; "X 100pre", Bad Bunny; "Gangalee", Farruko; "Aura", Ozuna
Favorite Tropical Artist	Favorite Tropical Song
Romeo Santos - Winner; Carlos Vives; Juan Luis Guerra; Marc Anthony	"Adicto", Prince Royce & Marc Anthony - Winner; "Inmortal", Aventura; "Centavito", Romeo Santos; "Vivir bailando", Silvestre Dangond & Maluma; "Aullando", Wisin & Yandel Ft. Romeo Santos
Favorite Tropical Album	Favorite Crossover Artist
"Utopía", Romeo Santos - Winner; "40… y contando (En vivo desde Puerto Rico)", Gilberto Santa Rosa; "Literal", Juan Luis Guerra; "OPUS", Marc Anthony	Drake - Winner; DJ Snake; Sean Paul; Snow
Favorite Tour	Favorite Video
Luis Miguel - Winner; Bad Bunny; Chayanne; Jennifer López; Marc Anthony	"R.I.P.", Sofía Reyes Ft. Rita Ora & Anitta) - Winner; "Te Confieso", Camila; "La Respuesta", Becky G & Maluma; "Si Supieras", Daddy Yankee Feat. Wisin & Yandel; "En Guerra", Sebastián Yatra & Camilo

== Multiple nominations and awards ==
Acts that received multiple nominations
Nominations	Act
9	Ozuna
7	Bad Bunny
7	Romeo Santos
6	Anuel AA
5	Banda Sinaloense MS de Sergio Lizárraga
4	Luis Fonsi
4	Maluma
4	Marc Anthony
4	Sebastián Yatra
4	T3r Elemento
3	Becky G
3	Christian Nodal
3	Daddy Yankee
3	DJ Snake
3	J Balvin
3	Rosalía
3	Wisin & Yandel
2	Cardi B
2	Carlos Santana
2	CNCO
2	Drake
2	Farruko
2	Juan Luis Guerra
2	Karol G
2	Los Ángeles Azules
2	Natalia Lafourcade
2	Pedro Capó
2	Selena Gomez
2	Snow

Acts that received multiple awards
Awards	Act
5	Anuel AA
2	Cardi B
2	Christian Nodal
2	CNCO
2	DJ Snake
2	Ozuna
2	Romeo Santos
2	Sebastián Yatra
2	Selena Gomez

== Special Honor ==
- International Artist Award of Excellence: Marc Anthony
- Extraordinary Evolution Award: Becky G
