= Éxitos 98:06 =

Greatest hits album by Luis Fonsi
- Released: November 21, 2006 (standard edition); February 6, 2007 (deluxe edition)
- Recorded: 1998–2006
- Genre: Latin pop
- Label: Universal Music Latino

Luis Fonsi chronology
| Paso a Paso (2005) | Éxitos 98:06 (00000001) | Palabras Del Silencio (2008) |

Singles from Éxitos 98:06
- 1. "Tu amor" Released: September 25, 2006

Professional ratings
Review scores
| Source | Rating |
|---|---|
| AllMusic | 4/5 stars |

Éxitos 98:06, released on November 21, 2006, is a compilation album by Luis Fonsi featuring songs from his first six albums, spanning the time period from 1998 to 2006, with the addition of two songs, "Tu amor" and "No lo Digas Más". A deluxe edition was released on February 6, 2007.

== Track listing ==
| No. | Title | Length |
|---|---|---|
| 1. | "Tu amor" | 3:47 |
| 2. | "No lo Digas Más" | 3:48 |
| 3. | "Nada Es Para Siempre" | 4:03 |
| 4. | "Por Una Mujer" | 2:55 |
| 5. | "Me Matas" | 3:13 |
| 6. | "¿Quién Te Dijo Eso?" | 4:36 |
| 7. | "Abrazar la Vida" | 3:37 |
| 8. | "Quisiera Poder Olvidarme de Ti" | 4:27 |
| 9. | "Imaginame Sin Ti" | 4:11 |
| 10. | "No Te Cambio Por Ninguna" | 3:44 |
| 11. | "Mi Sueño" | 4:21 |
| 12. | "Perdóname" | 4:02 |
| 13. | "Si Tú Quisieras" | 4:26 |

Deluxe version
| No. | Title | Length |
|---|---|---|
| 1. | "Tu amor" | 3:44 |
| 2. | "No lo Digas Más" | 3:45 |
| 3. | "Nada Es Para Siempre" | 4:00 |
| 4. | "Por Una Mujer" | 2:52 |
| 5. | "Me Matas" | 3:10 |
| 6. | "¿Quién Te Dijo Eso?" | 4:33 |
| 7. | "Abrazar la Vida" | 3:34 |
| 8. | "Quisiera Poder Olvidarme de Ti" | 4:24 |
| 9. | "Imagíname Sin Ti" | 4:08 |
| 10. | "No Te Cambio Por Ninguna" | 3:41 |
| 11. | "Mi Sueño" | 4:17 |
| 12. | "Perdóname" | 3:49 |
| 13. | "Si Tú Quisieras" | 4:23 |
| 14. | "Vives en Mi" | 3:40 |
| 15. | "Tu Amor" (acoustic version) | 3:41 |
| 16. | "No lo Digas Mas" (acoustic version) | 3:44 |
| 17. | "Paso a Paso" | 3:53 |

== Charts ==
| Chart (2006) | Peak position |
|---|---|
| Spanish Album Chart | 34 |
| US Billboard 200 | 192 |
| US Billboard Top Latin Albums | 11 |
| US Billboard Latin Pop Albums | 7 |

== Singles ==
=== "Tu Amor" ===
| Year | Chart | Peak |
|---|---|---|
| 2007 | Billboard Hot Latin Tracks | 1 |
