= Amor Secreto =

Amor Secreto may refer to:

- Amor Secreto (album), a 2002 album by Luis Fonsi
- Amor secreto (TV series), a Venezuelan telenovela
