= List of number-one albums of 2011 (Spain) =

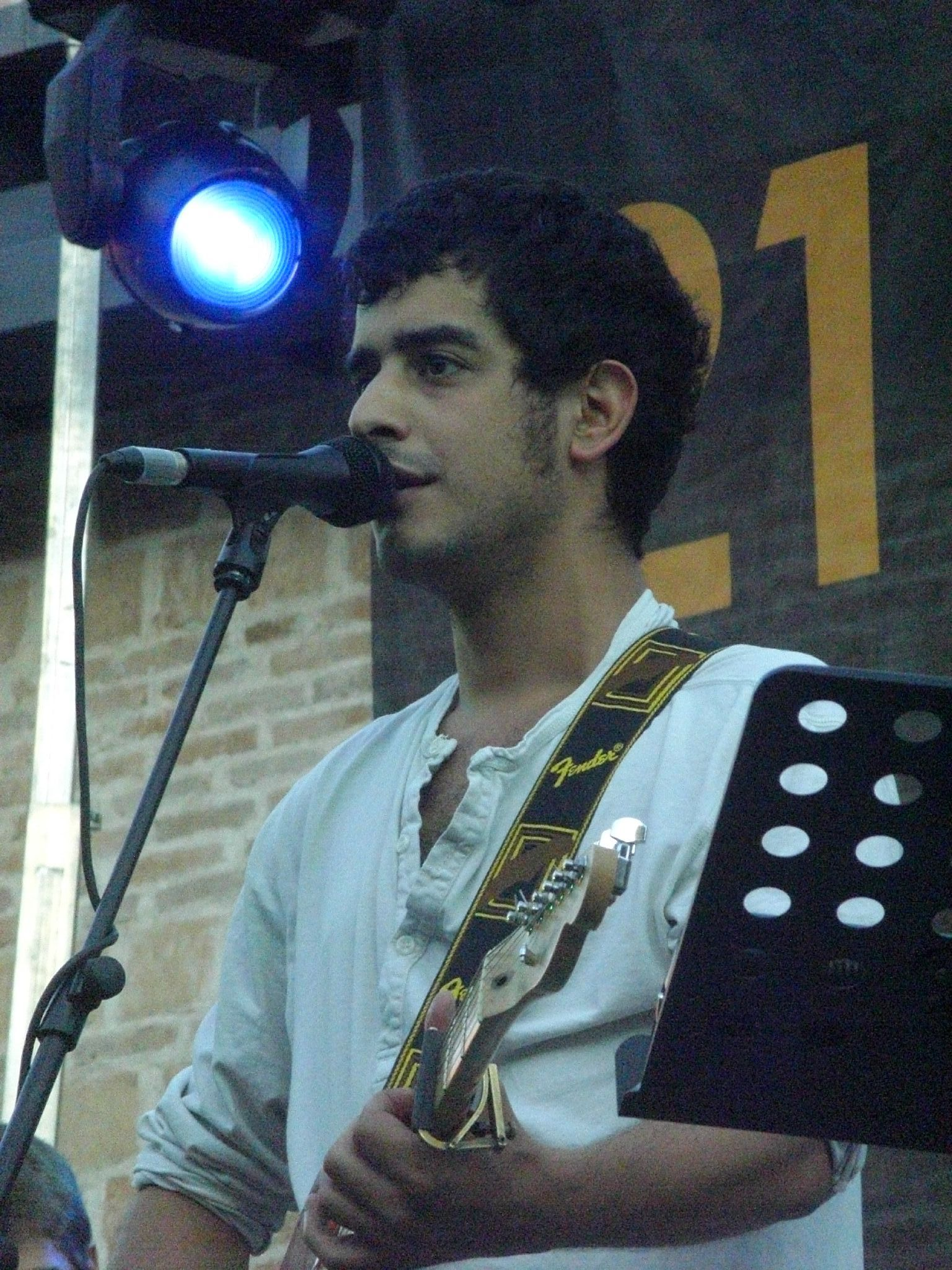
Roger Padilla, member of Spanish indie group Manel. With their second studio album 10 Milles per Veure una Bona Armadura, they became the first band singing in Catalan to ever top the Spanish charts.

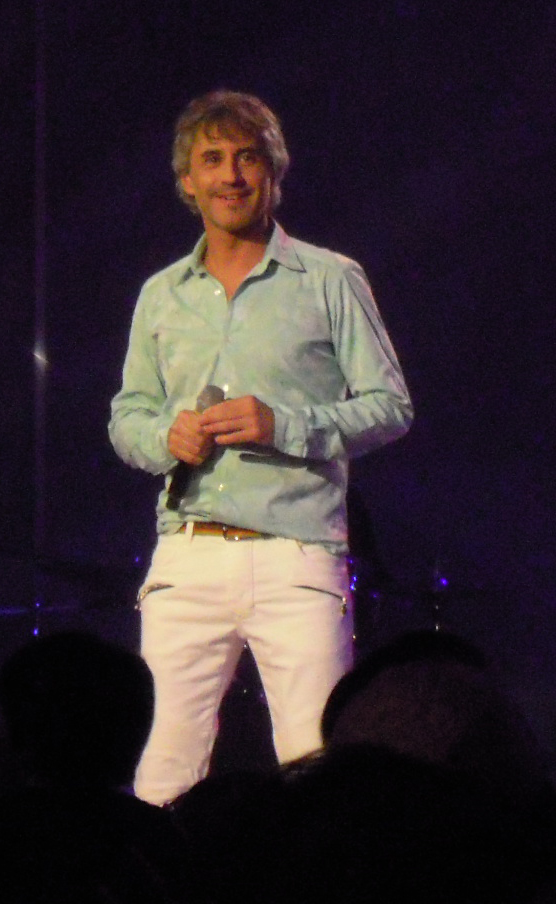
Spanish singer Sergio Dalma stayed at number-one for 10 consecutive weeks in 2010 and 2011 with his fifteenth studio album Via Dalma, before topping the charts later in the year with its follow-up Via Dalma II.

Top 100 España is a record chart published weekly by PROMUSICAE (Productores de Música de España), a non-profit organization composed by Spain and multinational record companies. This association tracks record sales (physical and digital) in Spain.

== Albums ==
| Chart date | Album | Artist(s) | Reference(s) |
|---|---|---|---|
| January 9 | Via Dalma | Sergio Dalma | |
| January 16 | Via Dalma | Sergio Dalma | |
| January 23 | Via Dalma | Sergio Dalma | |
| January 30 | Via Dalma | Sergio Dalma | |
| February 6 | Pablo Alborán | Pablo Alborán | |
| February 13 | Pablo Alborán | Pablo Alborán | |
| February 20 | Pablo Alborán | Pablo Alborán | |
| February 27 | Pablo Alborán | Pablo Alborán | |
| March 6 | Pablo Alborán | Pablo Alborán | |
| March 13 | Pablo Alborán | Pablo Alborán | |
| March 20 | 10 Milles per Veure una Bona Armadura | Manel | |
| March 27 | 10 Milles per Veure una Bona Armadura | Manel | |
| April 3 | Gran Rex | Bunbury | |
| April 10 | Pablo Alborán | Pablo Alborán | |
| April 17 | Drama y Luz | Maná | |
| April 24 | Drama y Luz | Maná | |
| May 1 | Drama y Luz | Maná | |
| May 8 | Drama y Luz | Maná | |
| May 15 | 20 | OBK | |
| May 22 | Fácil | Maldita Nerea | |
| May 29 | Material Defectuoso | Extremoduro | |
| June 5 | Material Defectuoso | Extremoduro | |
| June 12 | Material Defectuoso | Extremoduro | |
| June 19 | Material Defectuoso | Extremoduro | |
| June 26 | Pablo Alborán | Pablo Alborán | |
| July 3 | 4 | Beyoncé | |
| July 10 | Tierra Firme | Luis Fonsi | |
| July 17 | Pablo Alborán | Pablo Alborán | |
| July 24 | Pablo Alborán | Pablo Alborán | |
| July 31 | Pablo Alborán | Pablo Alborán | |
| August 7 | Pablo Alborán | Pablo Alborán | |
| August 14 | Pablo Alborán | Pablo Alborán | |
| August 21 | Pablo Alborán | Pablo Alborán | |
| August 28 | Pablo Alborán | Pablo Alborán | |
| September 4 | I'm with You | Red Hot Chili Peppers | |
| September 11 | Nothing but the Beat | David Guetta | |
| September 18 | Cometas por el Cielo | La Oreja de Van Gogh | |
| September 25 | Cometas por el Cielo | La Oreja de Van Gogh | |
| October 2 | Hacia lo Salvaje | Amaral | |
| October 9 | Hacia lo Salvaje | Amaral | |
| October 16 | Hacia lo Salvaje | Amaral | |
| October 23 | Hacia lo Salvaje | Amaral | |
| October 30 | Los Días Intactos | Manolo García | |
| November 6 | Los Días Intactos | Manolo García | |
| November 13 | Los Días Intactos | Manolo García | |
| November 20 | En Acústico | Pablo Alborán | |
| November 27 | 2.0 | Estopa | |
| December 4 | Via Dalma II | Sergio Dalma | |
| December 11 | Via Dalma II | Sergio Dalma | |
| December 18 | Via Dalma II | Sergio Dalma | |
| December 25 | Via Dalma II | Sergio Dalma | |
| January 1 | Via Dalma II | Sergio Dalma | |
