= Remixes (Luis Fonsi album) =

Remix album by Luis Fonsi
- Released: April 17, 2001
- Recorded: 1998–00
- Genre: Latin pop
- Label: Universal Latino

Luis Fonsi chronology
Eterno (2000)	Remixes (2001)	Amor Secreto (2002)

Professional ratings
Review scores
Source	Rating
AllMusic	2/5 stars

Remixes, released in 2001, is a compilation album by Luis Fonsi featuring remixes of songs from his first two albums, Comenzaré and Eterno.

== Track listing ==
1. "Mi Sueño (Radio Edit)" – 3:36
2. "Mi Sueño (Club Mix)" – 9:20
3. "No Te Cambio Por Ninguna (Radio Edit)" – 3:25
4. "No Te Cambio Por Ninguna (Club Mix)" – 7:28
5. "No Te Cambio Por Ninguna (Dance Mix)" – 8:54
6. "Imaginame Sin Ti (Remix)" – 4:07
7. "Me Iré (Remix)" – 5:01
8. "Me Iré (Club Mix)" – 3:38
9. "No Te Cambio Por Ninguna (Radio Edit-Instrumental)" – 3:25
10. "Mi Sueño (Radio Edit-Instrumental)" – 3:36
