= Tu Amor =

Tu Amor may refer to:

- "Tu Amor" (Jon B. song), 1997, later covered by RBD in 2006
- "Tu Amor" (Luis Fonsi song), 2006
- "Tu Amor", 1998 song by Olga Tañón from the album Te Acordarás de Mí
