= Imagíname Sin Ti =

2000 single by Luis Fonsi

Single by Luis Fonsi

from the album Eterno
- Released: 2000
- Genre: R&B
- Length: 4:26
- Label: Universal Latino
- Composers: Rudy Pérez; Mark Portmann
- Lyricist: Pérez
- Producer: Pérez

Luis Fonsi singles chronology
"Me Iré" (1999)	"Imagíname Sin Ti" (2000)	"No Te Cambio por Ninguna" (2000)

"Imagíname Sin Ti" is a song by Puerto Rican singer Luis Fonsi from his second studio album, Eterno (2000). The song was written by Rudy Pérez and Mark Portmann, with the former handling its production. It is an R&B-tinged ballad about the singer moving away from his lover and realizing he cannot live without her. Fonsi also recorded an English-language version of the song titled "Imagine Me Without You", which was produced by Veit Renn. The accompanying music video for the Spanish version was filmed by Marlene Salomé and filmed in Venezuela.

Commercially, "Imagíname Sin Ti" topped the Billboard Hot Latin Songs and Tropical Airplay charts in the United States. It was recognized as one of the best-performing Latin songs of the year at the 2001 American Society of Composers, Authors and Publishers (ASCAP) Latin Awards. The song has been covered by Jaci Velasquez, Martin Nievera Abraham Mateo, and CNCO. Velasquez's version received airplay on Christian radio stations and was nominated Song of the Year at the 2001 GMA Dove Awards.

== Background and composition ==
In 1998, Luis Fonsi released his debut album, Comenzaré, which was well-received and certified platinum in the Latin field by the Recording Industry Association of America. It led to Fonsi receiving a nomination for Pop Album of the Year by a New Artist at the 2000 Billboard Latin Music Awards. In June 2000, his record label Universal Music Latino announced that Fonsi would release his next studio album, Eterno, on June 20, 2000. Eterno was produced by Cuban American musician Rudy Pérez. For the project, Fonsi was "involved in every step of the way" including the chorus arrangements. Pérez and Mark Portmann wrote the opening track "Imagíname Sin Ti", which was deemed a "R&B-tinged ballad". Lyrically, Billboard editor Suzette Fernandez described it as "for anyone who moves away from a loved one and realizes that you can't live without that person". Pérez originally wrote it as a poem and was inspired by his "eternal love for his wife". Fonsi also recorded an English-language version of the song titled "Imagine Me Without You" which was produced by Veit Renn.

== Promotion and reception ==
"Imagíname Sin Ti" was released as Eterno's lead single in 2000 by Universal Music Latino. A remix of the track was included on Remixes (2001), while the track itself was included on his greatest hits album Éxitos 98:06 (2006). The accompanying music video was directed by Marlene Salomé, filmed in Venezuela, and features Venezuelan actress Gaby Espino. Ramiro Burr wrote for the San Antonio Express-News that the song "showcases Fonsi's limited but effective vocal range". In 2017, Billboard editor Suzette Fernandez listed it as among Fonsi's 15 best songs. In the same year, a writer for Telemundo noted it as one of Fonsi's best songs that had been forgotten. At the 2001 ASCAP Latin Music Awards, it was recognized as the best-performing Latin songs of the year under "Pop/Balada" category. Commercially, it became Fonsi's first number one song on the Billboard Hot Latin Songs and Tropical Airplay charts, while also peaking at number two on the Latin Pop Airplay chart. It was 20th best-performing track of 2000 on the Hot Latin Songs year-end chart.

The English version was covered by American singer Jaci Velasquez on her fourth studio album, Crystal Clear (2000). This version was also produced by Pérez along with Mark Heimmerman and released as its lead single in 2000 on Christian radio stations where it received airplay. On the review of the album, Jesus Freak Hideout reviewer John DiBlase mentioned it as one of the record's "powerful" ballads, while The Washington Post contributor Richard Harrington found it to be "inspirational". Velasquez's cover was nominated Song of the Year at the 32nd GMA Dove Awards in 2001, but ultimately lost to "Redeemer" by Nicole C. Mullen.

Other covers included the English version covered by Filipino singer Martin Nievera on his album More Souvenirs (2001), with a few alterations to the lyrics, and the original Spanish version recorded by Latin American boy band CNCO for their covers album, Déjà Vu (2021), where it released as the ninth single from the album that same year.

== Personnel ==
Adapted from the Eterno liner notes:

- David Cole –mixing
- Luis Fonsi – lead vocals
- Michael Greene –engineering
- Shawn McIntire –engineering assistant
- Raul Midon – chorus arrangement, background vocalist
- Joel Numa –engineering
- Rudy Pérez – producer, director, arrangement
- Mark Portmann – keyboards, arrangement, programming
- Neil Stubenahus – bass
- Felipe Tichauer –engineering assistant
- Michael Thompson – guitar
- Utah Symphony – strings
- Larry Warrilow – copyist
- Bruce Weeden –engineering

== Charts ==
=== Weekly charts ===
Chart performance for "Imagíname Sin Ti"
Chart (2000)	Peak position
US Hot Latin Songs (Billboard)	1
US Latin Pop Airplay (Billboard)	2
US Tropical Airplay (Billboard)	1

=== Year-end charts ===
2000 year-end chart performance for "Imagíname Sin Ti"
Chart (2000)	Position
US Hot Latin Songs (Billboard)	20
US Latin Pop Airplay (Billboard)	10
US Tropical Airplay (Billboard)	8

== See also ==
- List of number-one Billboard Hot Latin Tracks of 2000
- List of Billboard Tropical Airplay number ones of 2000
