= Fight the Feeling =

Studio album by Luis Fonsi
- Released: July 2, 2002
- Recorded: 2001–02
- Genre: Pop; R&B
- Label: MCA

Luis Fonsi chronology
Amor Secreto (2002)	Fight the Feeling (2002)	Abrazar la vida (2003)

Singles from Fight the Feeling
- 1. "Secret" Released: May 2002

Professional ratings
Review scores
Source	Rating
AllMusic	2.5/5 stars

Fight the Feeling, released in 2002, is the fourth album by Puerto Rican singer Luis Fonsi, and to date, his only album released in English.

== Track listing ==
1. "Fight the Feeling" – 3:39
2. "Secret" – 3:48
3. "Turn It Up" – 3:33
4. "Save Me" – 4:36
5. "You Got Nothing on Me" – 3:15
6. "If Only" – 4:34
7. "Keep My Cool" – 3:13
8. "Tell Her Tonight" – 4:06
9. "Twisted" – 4:14
10. "One Night Thing" – 3:58
11. "I Wish" – 4:09

"Keep My Cool" was covered by Korean singer BoA for her song "Spark" in her album My Name which was released in 2004.

== Personnel ==
- Johan Åberg – engineer, guitar, keyboards, producer, programming
- Humberto Alvarez – stylist
- Dow Brain – keyboards, producer, programming
- Dean Butterworth – drums
- Ron Cadiz – cover photo
- Cutfather – producer, remixing
- Kara DioGuardi – producer, vocals (background)
- Ryan Dorn – engineer
- Luis Fonsi – vocals (background)
- Jon Gass – mixing
- Julio Hernandez – bass
- Jean-Marie Horvat – mixing
- David Irvin – art direction, design
- Sebastian Krys – mixing
- David Leach – percussion
- Jolie Levine-Aller – production coordination
- Clyde Lieberman – A&R
- Manny Marraquin – mixing
- Harvey Mason Jr. – producer
- Mischke – engineer, producer, programming, vocal arrangement, vocal producer, vocals (background)
- Steve Morales – producer, programming
- Joel Numa – engineer
- Esbjörn Öhrwall – guitar
- Mario Patiño – production coordination
- Dave Pensado – mixing
- Betsy Perez – production coordination
- Rudy Pérez – guitar, producer
- Clay Perry – keyboards, programming
- Gen Rubin – drum programming, engineer, keyboards, percussion, producer
- Dave Russell – engineer
- Jonas Saeed – producer, vocal arrangement
- Andy Schlesinger – engineer
- David Siegel – keyboards
- Brian Steckler – producer, programming
- Shane Stoner – engineer
- Neil Stubenhaus – bass
- Supaflyas – keyboards, producer, programming
- Gino Tanabe – stylist
- Damon Thomas – producer
- Michael Hart Thompson – guitar
- Michael Tucker – engineer
- Dan Warner – guitar
- Bruce Weeden – engineer, mixing
- Brad Young – guitar, producer
- Sigurd Rosnes – keyboards, programming, vocals (background)

== Charts ==
Chart (2002)	Peak position
Billboard Heatseekers Albums	21
