= Tierra Firme (album) =

2011 album by Mateo martel

Studio album by Luis Fonsi
- Released: June 28, 2011
- Recorded: 2010–2011
- Studios: Jet Wash Studios; Studio 1203; (Miami Beach, Florida)
- Genre: Latin pop
- Length: 42:49
- Label: Universal Latino
- Producers: Luis Fonsi; Armando Ávila; Dan Warner; Lee Levin; Louis Bianconcello; Sam Watters; Sebastián Krys; Claudia Brant

Luis Fonsi chronology
Palabras del Silencio (2008)	Tierra Firme (2011)	8 (2014)

Singles from Tierra Firme
- 1. "Gritar" Released: April 11, 2011; 2. "Respira" Released: July 18, 2011; 3. "Claridad" Released: October 3, 2011

Tierra Firme (Mainland) is the eighth studio album recorded by Puerto Rican singer-songwriter Luis Fonsi. It was released by Universal Music Latino on June 28, 2011 (see 2011 in music).

== Track listing ==
1. "Explícame"
2. "Respira"
3. "Dime Que No"
4. "Gritar"
5. "Nunca Digas Siempre"
6. "Me Gustas Tú"
7. "Vuelve a Mi Lado"
8. "El Anillo y La Flor"
9. "Claridad"
10. "Se Supone"
11. "A Un Paso de Tenerte"
12. "Víctima"
13. "Renacer"
14. "Gritar" (Mexican Regional Version)
15. "Claridad" (Dance Remix)

== Charts ==
=== Weekly charts ===
Chart (2011)	Peak position
Spanish Albums (Promusicae)	1
US Billboard 200	56
US Top Latin Albums (Billboard)	1
US Latin Pop Albums (Billboard)	1

=== Year-end charts ===
Chart (2011)	Position
US Top Latin Albums (Billboard)	40

== Certifications ==
Region	Certification
Chile	Gold
Venezuela (AVINPRO)	Platinum

== See also ==
- List of number-one Billboard Latin Albums from the 2010s
- List of number-one albums of 2011 (Spain)
