= Abrazar la vida =

Abrazar la Vida

Studio album by Luis Fonsi
- Released: October 28, 2003
- Genre: Latin pop
- Label: Universal Latino

Luis Fonsi chronology
Fight the Feeling (2002)	Abrazar la Vida (2003)	Paso a Paso (2005)

Singles from Abrazar la Vida
- 1. "¿Quién Te Dijo Eso?" Released: August 11, 2003; 2. "Abrazar la Vida" Released: December 8, 2003; 3. "Por Ti Podría Morir" Released: March 29, 2004; 4. "Yo Te Propongo" Released: July 26, 2004

Abrazar la Vida (Embrace Life), released on October 28, 2003, is the fifth album by Luis Fonsi.

== Reception ==
Professional ratings
Review scores
Source	Rating
AllMusic	3.5/5 stars

The AllMusic review awarded the album 3 1/2 stars stating "Fonsi opens ABRAZAR LA VIDA with the plaintive torch song "Quien Te Dijo Eso?," akin to Babyface's country turn on "When Will I See You Again," followed by the more R&B-flavored, but still torch-laden, title song. However, the dance floor is not ignored, as Latin horn touches snake in infectiously on the frenetic "Yo Te Propongo," an almost dizzying number. On ABRAZAR LA VIDA, Fonsi reveals himself to be most comfortable in the modern crooner dye, and casts a satisfying pop shadow with his fifth album.".

== Track listing ==
1. "¿Quién Te Dijo Eso?" – 4:33
2. "Abrazar la Vida" – 3:34
3. "Yo Te Propongo" – 4:47
4. "Extraño Sentimiento" – 3:55
5. "Por Ti Podría Morir" – 4:00
6. "Yo" – 3:41
7. "Viviendo en el Ayer" – 4:12
8. "Te Echo de Menos" – 4:26
9. "Eso Que Llaman Amor" – 4:07
10. "La Fuerza de Mi Corazón" (duet with Christina Valemi) – 4:12
11. "Elígeme" – 4:50
12. "Se Supone" – 3:47

== Personnel ==
- Carolina Arenas – production coordination
- Jose Blanco – mastering
- Valério Do Carmo – art direction
- Judy Figueroa – graphic design
- Luis Fonsi – arranger, producer
- José Gaviria – arranger, keyboards, producer, programming
- Jeeve – arranger, direction, producer
- David Lopez – assistant engineer
- Manny López – arranger, engineer, programming
- Boris Milan – engineer
- Sergio Minski – production coordination
- Joel Numa – engineer
- Mario Patiño – creative director, text
- Cucco Peña – arranger, direction, producer
- Betsy Perez – production coordination
- Rudy Pérez – arranger, direction, producer
- Clay Perry – keyboards, programming
- Mark Portmann – arranger, producer
- Julio Estrada "Fruko" Rincón – arranger
- Milton Salcedo – percussion, producer, wind arrangements
- Kike Santander – producer
- Felipe Tichauer – engineer, mezcla
- Tony Vera – photography
- Juan Jose Virviescas – engineer
- Bruce Weeden – engineer
- Casey Felix – photography

== Chart performance ==
Chart (2003)	Peak position
Billboard 200	138
Billboard Top Latin Albums	3
Billboard Latin Pop Albums	3
Billboard Heatseekers Albums	3

Year	Chart (2003–2004)	Song	Peak
2003	Billboard Hot Latin Tracks	"Quien Te Dijo Eso?"	3
2004	Billboard Hot Latin Tracks	"Abrazar La Vida"	1
2004	Billboard Hot Latin Tracks	"Por Ti Podria Morir"	29

== Sales and certifications ==
Region	Certification	Certified units/sales
Chile	Gold	10,000
United States (RIAA)	Platinum (Latin)	100,000^{^}
^{^} Shipments figures based on certification alone.
