= Paso a Paso =

Studio album by Luis Fonsi
- Released: July 12, 2005
- Recorded: February – June 2005
- Studio: Crescent Moon Studios; Mofongo Studio; The Reed Door Studio; The Gallery Recording Studios; The Hit Factory (Critiera); (Miami, FL); The Tiki Room Studio; (Pembroke Pines, FL)
- Genre: Latin pop; pop rock; soft rock; Latin ballad
- Length: 40:23
- Language: Spanish
- Label: Universal Latino
- Producer: Luis Fonsi; Sebastián Krys; Jeeve

Luis Fonsi chronology
| Abrazar la Vida (2003) | Paso a Paso (2005) | Éxitos 98:06 (2006) |

Singles from Paso a Paso
- 1. "Nada Es Para Siempre" Released: May 23, 2005; 2. "Estoy Perdido" Released: September 19, 2005; 3. "Por Una Mujer" Released: January 2, 2006; 4. "Paso a Paso" Released: March 13, 2006; 5. "Vivo Muriendo" Released: May 29, 2006

Professional ratings
Review scores
| Source | Rating |
|---|---|
| Allmusic | 3.5/5 stars |

Paso a Paso (English: Step by Step) is the sixth studio album recorded by Puerto Rican-American singer-songwriter Luis Fonsi. The album was released by Universal Music Latino on July 12, 2005 (see 2005 in music). The album was certified Disco de Platino for shipments of 200,000 units in the United States.

== Track listing ==
| No. | Title | Writer(s) | Producer (es) | Length |
|---|---|---|---|---|
| 1. | "Nada Es Para Siempre" | Amaury Gutiérrez | Sebastián Krys | 4:00 |
| 2. | "Arrópame" | Luis Fonsi; Jean Rodríguez; Edward J. Montilla | Sebastián Krys | 3:32 |
| 3. | "Escondido" | Luis Fonsi; Claudia Brant | Sebastián Krys | 4:14 |
| 4. | "Estoy Perdido" | Sebastián Krys; Juan Carlos Pérez-Soto | Sebastián Krys | 3:47 |
| 5. | "Por Una Mujer" | Elsten Torres; Marthin Chan | Sebastián Krys | 2:52 |
| 6. | "Vivo Muriendo" | Sebastián Krys; Bárbara Larrinaga; Carlos Celles | Sebastián Krys | 4:12 |
| 7. | "Me Matas" | Luis Fonsi; Claudia Brant | Sebastián Krys | 3:10 |
| 8. | "Me lo Dice el Alma" | Luis Fonsi; Claudia Brant; Noel Schajris | Sebastián Krys | 4:14 |
| 9. | "Para Mí" | Luis Fonsi; Claudia Brant | Sebastián Krys | 3:03 |
| 10. | "Todo Sigue Igual" | Luis Fonsi; Claudia Brant | Luis Fonsi; Jeeve | 3:47 |
| 11. | "Paso a Paso" | Luis Fonsi; Claudia Brant | Sebastián Krys | 3:45 |
| Total length: | | | | 40:23 |

== Charts ==
| Peak position | Peak position |
|---|---|
| Billboard 200 Album Chart | 62 |
| Billboard Top Latin Albums | 2 |
| Billboard Latin Pop Albums | 2 |
| Spain Album Charts | 7 |

== Single charts ==
=== "Nada Es Para Siempre" ===
| Year | Chart | Peak |
|---|---|---|
| 2005 | Billboard Hot Latin Tracks | 1 |
| 2005 | Billboard Latin Pop Airplay | 1 |
| 2005 | Billboard Latin Tropical Airplay | 1 |
| 2005 | Billboard Hot 100 | 90 |

=== "Paso a Paso" ===
| Year | Chart | Peak |
|---|---|---|
| 2006 | Billboard Latin Pop Airplay | 32 |

=== "Estoy Perdido" ===
| Year | Chart | Peak |
|---|---|---|
| 2005 | Billboard Hot Latin Tracks | 9 |

=== "Por Una Mujer" ===
| Year | Chart | Peak |
|---|---|---|
| 2006 | Billboard Hot Latin Tracks | 16 |
| 2006 | Billboard Latin Pop Airplay | 4 |
| 2006 | Billboard Latin Tropical Airplay | 9 |

== Sales and certifications ==
| Region | Certification | Certified units/sales |
|---|---|---|
| Spain (PROMUSICAE) | Gold | 40,000^{^} |
| United States (RIAA) | Platinum (Latin) | 100,000^{^} |
^{^} Shipments figures based on certification alone.
