= Tu amor (Luis Fonsi song) =

2006 single by Luis Fonsi

"Tu Amor"

Single by Luis Fonsi

from the album Éxitos 98:06
- Released: September 25, 2006
- Recorded: 2006
- Genre: Latin pop; soft rock; latin ballad
- Length: 3:47
- Label: Universal Music Latino
- Songwriter: Jeremías
- Producers: Sebastián Krys; Dan Warner; Lee Levin

Luis Fonsi singles chronology
"Paso a Paso" (2006)	"Tu Amor" (2006)	"No Me Doy por Vencido" (2008)

"Tu Amor" (English: Your Love) is a ballad written by British–Venezuelan singer-songwriter Jeremías, produced by Sebastián Krys and co-produced by Dam Warner and Lee Levin and performed by Puerto Rican-American singer-songwriter Luis Fonsi. It was included as the one of two new cuts on his greatest hits package Éxitos 98:06 (2006). The song was released as a single to promote the CD. A music video was released in conjunction with the song. It became another hit for Fonsi. "Tu Amor" has peaked at number-one on Billboard's Hot Latin Tracks chart.

== Versions ==
- "Tu amor" (Album version)
- "Tu amor" (Salsa version)
- "Tu amor" (Reggaeton version featuring Arcángel)

== Charts ==
Chart (2006)	Peak position
US Bubbling Under Hot 100 (Billboard)	20
US Billboard Hot Latin Tracks	1
US Billboard Latin Pop Airplay	1
US Billboard Latin Tropical Airplay	3
