= Coliseo Centenario =

Multi-purpose complex in Coahuila, Mexico

Coordinates: 25.588511°N 103.403385°W

Coliseo Centenario de Torreón
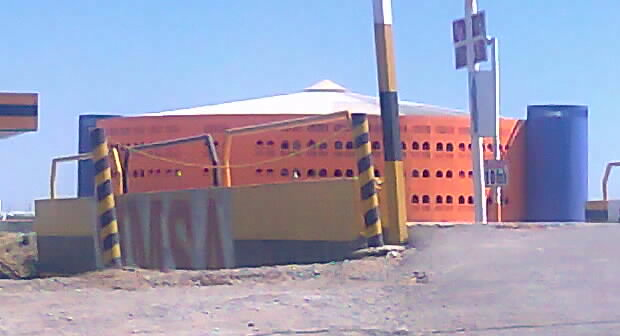
- ColiseoCentenario
- Interactive map of Coliseo Centenario de Torreón
- Location: Raul Lopez Sanchez s/n y Carretera a San Pedro Torreón, Mexico
- Owner: Privately Own
- Operator: Director of Operations: Francisco Mata & Director of Marketing & Image: Rafael Cortes Montalvo
- Capacity: Maximum 11,500

Construction
- Groundbreaking: October 2006
- Opened: February 8, 2008
- Cost: $100 million MXN
- Architect: Gilberto Of Yta

The Coliseo Centenario de Torreón (Centennial Coliseum of Torreón in English), officially named "Centro de Espectaculos Coliseo Centenario" is a multi-purpose complex in Torreón, in the state of Coahuila, Mexico. The complex can seat up to 10,000 people. It can also accommodate and services concerts, theater, sports venue, exhibitions and conventions it also has restaurants, a bullfighting museum, and offices.

Coliseo Centenario is one of the most modern centers of spectacles of the north of the country in Mexico. Its first event was bullfighting event on February 8, 2008. It first music concert was held on February 14, 2008, performed by the remaining members of The Doors. Other musical acts that appear at the Coliseo Centenario includes Banda el Recodo, Maná, Mägo de Oz, Pedro Fernández, Café Tacuba and Juan Gabriel.
