= 8 (Luis Fonsi album) =

Studio album by Luis Fonsi
- Released: May 19, 2014
- Recorded: 2013–14
- Studios: Miami, Florida; (Blue Room Studios); London, United Kingdom; (Kensaltown Recording Studios); Nashville, Tennessee; (Little Big Sound)
- Genre: Latin pop
- Label: Universal Latin
- Producer: Martin Terefe

Luis Fonsi chronology
Tierra Firme (2011)	8 (2014)	2En1 (2018)

Luis Fonsi studio album chronology
Tierra Firme (2011)	8 (2014)	Vida (2018)

Singles from 8
- 1. "Corazón En La Maleta" Released: February 17, 2014; 2. "Llegaste Tú" Released: August 25, 2014; 3. "Que Quieres de Mí" Released: October 13, 2014; 4. "Tentación" Released: June 8, 2015

8 is the ninth studio album by Puerto Rican singer Luis Fonsi. He collaborated with Juan Luis Guerra in the song "Llegaste Tú", a song that Fonsi dedicated to Mikaela, his daughter. It was released on May 19, 2014, through Universal Music Latin Entertainment.

== Track listing ==
8 (standard edition)
No.	Title	Writer(s)	Length
1.	"Anónimos"	Luis Fonsi; Claudia Brant; Martín Terefe	4:14
2.	"No te pertenece"	Luis Fonsi; Claudia Brant; Noel Schajris	5:01
3.	"Corazón en la maleta"	Luis Fonsi; Claudia Brant	3:39
4.	"Qué quieres de mí"	Luis Fonsi; Claudia Brant; Noel Schajris	4:32
5.	"Somos uno"	Luis Fonsi; Claudia Brant; Justin Gray	3:41
6.	"Regálame un minuto más"	Luis Fonsi; Horacio Palencia	3:41
7.	"Cansada"	Luis Fonsi; Claudia Brant	4:19
8.	"Llegaste tú" (featuring Juan Luis Guerra)	Luis Fonsi; Claudia Brant	3:40
9.	"Aprendí"	Luis Fonsi; Erika Ender	4:21
10.	"Cuando me dejes de amar"	Luis Fonsi; Claudia Brant; Martín Terefe	4:14
11.	"Corazón multicolor"	Luis Fonsi; Mónica Vélez	4:03
Total length:			45:28

8 (deluxe edition)
No.	Title	Writer(s)	Length
11.	"El tren"	Luis Fonsi; Claudia Brant; Martín Terefe	3:29
12.	"Un presentimiento"	Luis Fonsi; David Santisteban	3:58
13.	"Tentación"	Luis Fonsi; Erika Ender	3:11
14.	"Sólo quiero darte amor"	Luis Fonsi; Claudia Brant; James Bryan; Martín Terefe	4:06
15.	"Corazón multicolor"	Luis Fonsi; Mónica Vélez	4:03
Total length:			60:13

== Charts ==
=== Weekly charts ===
Chart (2014)	Peak position
Argentina Albums (CAPIF)	6
Spanish Albums (Promusicae)	4
US Billboard 200	60
US Top Latin Albums (Billboard)	2
US Latin Pop Albums (Billboard)	2

=== Year-end charts ===
Chart (2014)	Position
US Top Latin Albums (Billboard)	42

== Sales and certifications ==
Region	Certification	Certified units/sales
Argentina (CAPIF)	Platinum	40,000^{^}
Chile	Platinum	
^{^} Shipments figures based on certification alone.
