= Eterno (Luis Fonsi album) =

Studio album by Luis Fonsi
- Released: June 20, 2000
- Recorded: 1999–2000
- Studio: On the Mark Recording Studios; (Los Angeles, CA); Cocoa Butt Recording Studio; (Culver City, CA); L.A. Recording Studios; (Salt Lake City, UT); The Hook Roon; (Winter Springs, FL); North Bay Recording Studios; (Miami Beach, FL); House of South; (South Miami, FL)
- Genre: Latin pop; acoustic; Latin ballad
- Length: 51:40
- Label: Universal Latino
- Producer: Luis Fonsi; Rudy Pérez; Veit Renn

Luis Fonsi chronology
Comenzaré (1998)	Eterno (2000)	Remixes (2001)

Singles from Eterno
- 1. "Imagíname Sin Ti" Released: April 24, 2000; 2. "No Te Cambio Por Ninguna" Released: September 25, 2000; 3. "Eterno" Released: November 13, 2000; 4. "Mi Sueño" Released: January 15, 2001; 5. "Sería Fácil" Released: March 12, 2001

Professional ratings
Review scores
Source	Rating
Allmusic	5/5 stars

Eterno (Eternal), is the second studio album by recorded Puerto Rican-American singer-songwriter Luis Fonsi, This album was released by Universal Music Latino on June 20, 2000 (see 2000 in music).

== Track listing ==
No.	Title	Writer(s)	Producer (es)	Length
1.	"Imagíname Sin Ti"	Mark Portmann; Rudy Pérez	Rudy Pérez	4:08
2.	"Déjame o Dame Amor"	Veit Renn · Jolyon Skinner; Lyrics: Spanish: Mario Patiño	Veit Renn	3:14
3.	"Eterno"	Mark Portmann; Rudy Pérez	Rudy Pérez	4:16
4.	"Te Vuelvo a Encontrar"	José Miguel Velásquez	Rudy Pérez	3:56
5.	"Dentro de Mi Corazón"	Rafael Esparza-Ruíz; Alán García	Rudy Pérez	4:24
6.	"Dime Si Tú" (How About You)	Joel Numa; Lyrics: Spanish: Rudy Pérez	Rudy Pérez	4:29
7.	"No Te Cambio Por Ninguna"	Franco De Vita	Veit Renn	3:41
8.	"Cuanto Quisiera"	Gilbert González · Rudy Pérez	Rudy Pérez	4:32
9.	"Dime Cómo Vuelvo a Tener Tu Corazón" (Show Me the Way Back to Your Heart)	Diane Warren; Lyrics: Spanish: Rudy Pérez	Rudy Pérez	3:52
10.	"Mi Sueño"	Luis Fonsi	Rudy Pérez	4:17
11.	"Love Me or Let Me Go"	Veit Renn; Jolyon Skinner	Veit Renn	3:14
12.	"Imagine Me Without You"	Mark Portmann; Rudy Pérez	Rudy Pérez	4:10
13.	"Sería Fácil"	Rudy Pérez	Rudy Pérez	3:50
Total length:				51:40

== Charts ==
Chart (2000)	Peak position
Billboard Top Latin Albums	6
Billboard Latin Pop Albums	2
Billboard Heatseekers Albums	44

Year	Chart (2000–2001)	Song	Peak
2000	Billboard Hot Latin Tracks	"No Te Cambio Por Ninguna"	28
2000	Billboard Hot Latin Tracks	"Imaginame Sin Ti"	1
2001	Billboard Hot Latin Tracks	"Mi Sueno"	27
2001	Billboard Latin Pop Airplay	"Eterno"	34

== Sales and certifications ==
Region	Certification	Certified units/sales
United States (RIAA)	Platinum (Latin)	100,000^{^}
^{^} Shipments figures based on certification alone.
