= Imposible (Luis Fonsi and Ozuna song) =

2018 song by Luis Fonsi and Ozuna

Single by Luis Fonsi and Ozuna

from the album Vida
- Language: Spanish
- English title: "Impossible"
- Released: October 19, 2018
- Length: 2:43
- Label: Universal Latin; Universal
- Songwriters: Luis Fonsi; Vicente Saavedra; Mauricio Rengifo; Juan Carlos Ozuna Rosado; Andrés Torres
- Producers: Andrés Torres; Mauricio Rengifo

Luis Fonsi singles chronology
"Pa' La Calle" (2018)	"Imposible" (2018)	"Baby" (2018)

Ozuna singles chronology
"Taki Taki" (2018)	"Imposible" (2018)	"Quiero Más" (2018)

"Imposible" is a song by Puerto Rican singers Luis Fonsi and Ozuna, released on October 19, 2018 through Universal Music Latin Entertainment. The song topped the charts in Chile and reached the top 10 in: Argentina, Bolivia, Panama and Spain.

== Background ==
Fonsi wrote a song with "a lot of feeling" and wanted a voice with a "perfect balance between urban and melodic", so he chose Ozuna. Fonsi stated that he wished to collaborate with Ozuna because he is "incredibly talented, has great vocals and great writing".

== Composition ==
The song is a "romantic urban tune" dedicated to women, from the point of view of a man. HotNewHipHop stated the track has the sound and potential to be a "'Despacito type single". El Mundo called the song a ballad mixed with reggaeton and similar to Fonsi's other "songs of this style that were characterized by their romantic lyrics and deep phrases".

== Music video ==
The music video was directed by Carlos Perez and filmed at Gold Coast Railroad Museum in Miami, FL in September 2018, with Fonsi confirming this on Instagram.

== Charts ==
=== Weekly charts ===
Chart (2018–19)	Peak position
Argentina (Argentina Hot 100)	8
Bolivia (Monitor Latino)	2
Chile (Monitor Latino)	1
Colombia (National-Report)	61
Ecuador (National-Report)	19
Israel (Media Forest TV Airplay)	10
Panama (Monitor Latino)	4
Portugal (AFP)	70
Puerto Rico (Monitor Latino)	1
Spain (Promusicae)	4
Switzerland (Schweizer Hitparade)	17
US Bubbling Under Hot 100 (Billboard)	10
US Hot Latin Songs (Billboard)	9
US Latin Airplay (Billboard)	1
US Latin Rhythm Airplay (Billboard)	1
Venezuela (National-Report)	1

=== Year-end charts ===
Chart (2018)	Position
Portugal Full Track Download (AFP)	183
Spain (PROMUSICAE)	95
Chart (2019)	Position
Portugal (AFP)	179
US Hot Latin Songs (Billboard)	32

== Certifications ==
Region	Certification	Certified units/sales
Brazil (Pro-Música Brasil)	Platinum	40,000^{‡}
Portugal (AFP)	Platinum	10,000^{‡}
Spain (Promusicae)	3× Platinum	300,000^{‡}
^{‡} Sales+streaming figures based on certification alone.

== See also ==
- List of Billboard Argentina Hot 100 top-ten singles in 2019
- List of Billboard number-one Latin songs of 2019
