= Amor Secreto (album) =

2002 studio album by Luis Fonsi

Studio album by Luis Fonsi
- Released: March 12, 2002
- Recorded: October 2001 – January 2002
- Studios: L.A. FX Studio; (Los Angeles, CA); North Bay Recording Studios; The Playroom Rec Studio; (Miami Beach, FL)
- Genres: Latin pop; R&B; soft rock; latin ballad
- Length: 47:26
- Language: Spanish
- Label: Universal Music Latino
- Producers: Johan Ăberg; Dow Brian; Jonas Saeed; Tommy Tysper; Mario Patiño; Harvey Mason Jr.; Kara DioGuardi; Luis Fonsi; Rudy Pérez; Steve Morales; Tulio Cremisini

Luis Fonsi chronology
Remixes (2001)	Amor Secreto (2002)	Fight the Feeling (2002)

Singles from Amor Secreto
- 1. "Quisiera Poder Olvidarme De Tí" Released: January 14, 2002; 2. "Amor Secreto" Released: May 6, 2002; 3. "Te Vas" Released: September 9, 2002

Professional ratings
Review scores
Source	Rating
AllMusic	5/5 stars

Amor Secreto (English: Secret Love) is the third studio album recorded by Puerto Rican-American singer-songwriter Luis Fonsi. The album was released by Universal Music Latino on March 12, 2002 (see 2002 in music).

== Track listing ==
No.	Title	Writer(s)	Producer (es)	Length
1.	"Quisiera Poder Olvidarme De Ti"	Mark Portmann; Rudy Pérez	Rudy Pérez	4:22
2.	"Fuera de Control"	Clyde Lieberman · Allan Rich · Johan Ǎberg · Ziggy; Lyrics: Spanish: Claudia Brant · Luis Fonsi	Johan Ǎberg; Luis Fonsi	3:15
3.	"Amor Secreto"	Tim James · Fredrik Thomander ·Anders Wikström; Lyrics: Spanish: Claudia Brant · Luis Fonsi	Brad Young; Dow Brain; Kara DioGuardi; Luis Fonsi	3:35
4.	"Entrégate"	Kara DioGuardi · David Siegel · Luis Fonsi · Steve Morales; Lyrics: Spanish: Claudia Brant · Luis Fonsi	Steve Morales	3:53
5.	"Te Vas"	Roberto Livi; Rudy Pérez	Rudy Pérez	4:01
6.	"Tienes Que Parar"	Jonas Saeed · Pia Sjöberg · Mattias; Lyrics: Spanish: Claudia Brant · Luis Fonsi	Brian "The Schick" Steckler · Jonas Saeed	3:31
7.	"Y Ahora Cómo Te Olvido"	Jorge Luis Piloto; Rudy Pérez	Rudy Pérez	4:03
8.	"Tú Puedes Salvarme"	Howie Dorough · Andrew Fromm · Harvey Mason Jr. · Damon Thomas · Mischke	Damon Thomas; Harvey Manson Jr.; Luis Fonsi	4:39
9.	"Díselo Ya"	Clyde Lieberman · Allan Rich · Luis Fonsi; Lyrics: Spanish: Claudia Brant · Luis Fonsi	Steve Morales; Luis Fonsi	4:08
10.	"Irresistible"	Tommy Tysper · Gustav Grizzly · Marcus Sepehrmanesh; Lyrics: Spanish: Claudia Brant · Luis Fonsi	Gustav Grizzly; Marcus Sepehrmanesh; Tommy Tysper; Luis Fonsi	3:38
11.	"Me Lo Dijo el Silencio"	Claudia Brant; Luis Fonsi	Luis Fonsi; Tulio Cremisini	4:41
12.	"Para Vivir"	Pablo Milanés	Luis Fonsi	3:40
Total length:				47:26

== Credits and personnel ==
=== Personnel ===
- Johan Åberg – producer
- Vincent Becchinelli – design
- Dow Brain – producer
- Ron Cadiz – photography
- Vinnie Colaiuta – bateria
- Tulio Cremisini – producer
- Kara DioGuardi – producer
- Rafael Ferro García – arranger
- Luis Fonsi – coros, executive producer, producer
- Jon Gass – mezcla
- Julio Hernández – bajo sexto
- David Irvin – art direction
- Ted Jensen – mastering
- Sebastian Krys – mezcla
- Michael Landau – guitar
- Lee Levin – bateria
- Iris Martínez – coros
- Harvey Mason Jr. – producer
- Carlos Mendoza – coros
- Steve Morales – didjeridu, producer
- Joel Numa – engineer
- Mario Patiño – producer
- Dave Pensado – mezcla
- Betsy Pérez – production coordination
- Rudy Pérez – arranger, coros, dirigida, guitar, keyboards, percussion, producer, programming
- Clay Perry – keyboards, programming
- Mark Portmann – arranger, keyboards, programming
- Jonas Saeed – producer
- Milton Sesenton – arranger, piano
- Simon Simantob – guitar
- Neil Stubenhaus – bajo sexto
- Steve Sykes – engineer
- Michael Hart Thompson – guitar
- Felipe Tichauer – engineer
- Ronnie Torres – engineer, mezcla
- Tommy Tysper – producer
- Anders Von Hofsten – coros
- Dan Warner – guitar
- Bruce Weeden – engineer
- Brad Young – producer

© MMII. Universal Music Latino.

== Charts ==
Chart (2002)	Peak position
Billboard 200	109
Billboard Top Latin Albums	1
Billboard Latin Pop Albums	1
Billboard Heatseekers Albums	1

Year	Chart (2002)	Song	Peak
2002	Billboard Hot Latin Tracks	"Quisiera Poder Olvidarme De Tí"	3
2002	Billboard Hot Latin Tracks	"Amor Secreto"	35
2002	Billboard Hot Latin Tracks	"Te Vas"	25

== Sales and certifications ==
Region	Certification	Certified units/sales
United States (RIAA)	Platinum (Latin)	100,000^{^}
^{^} Shipments figures based on certification alone.
