= Vida (Luis Fonsi album) =

2019 studio album by Luis Fonsi

Studio album by Luis Fonsi
- Released: February 1, 2019
- Recorded: 2016–2018
- Genre: Latin pop
- Length: 52:25
- Languages: Spanish; English
- Label: Universal Latin
- Producers: Mauricio Rengifo; Andrés Torres

Luis Fonsi chronology
Despacito & Mis Grandes Éxitos (2017)	Vida (2019)	Ley de Gravedad (2022)

Luis Fonsi studio album chronology
8 (2014)	Vida (2019)	Ley de Gravedad (2022)

Singles from Vida
- 1. "Despacito" Released: January 13, 2017; 2. "Échame la Culpa" Released: November 17, 2017; 3. "Calypso" Released: June 14, 2018; 4. "Imposible" Released: October 19, 2018; 5. "Sola" Released: January 23, 2019

Vida (Life) is the tenth studio album by Puerto Rican singer Luis Fonsi, released on February 1, 2019, through Universal Music Latin Entertainment. It received a nomination for Best Latin Pop Album at the 62nd Annual Grammy Awards and for Album of the Year at the 20th Annual Latin Grammy Awards.

Vida is Fonsi's first album in five years, and features the singles "Despacito" (both the original version and remix), "Échame la Culpa", "Calypso" (both the original version and remix), "Imposible" and "Sola". Commercially the album sold over one million copies in the United States, topping the Billboard Top Latin Albums.

== Background and composition ==
After the ninth studio album 8 published in 2014, Fonsi started working on the next project. In 2017 he published "Despacito" with Daddy Yankee, which topped the charts of 47 official charts and won four Latin Grammy Awards, including for Record of the Year and Song of the Year. The same year Fonsi published "Échame la Culpa" with Demi Lovato which reached number one in sixteen countries charts worldwide.

Along with its singles, the primarily Spanish album includes "Sola", which was described as a "mid-tempo, sultry R&B tinged jam over sparse arrangements" by Billboard. It includes a variety of tempos, ranging from the "up-tempo urban/pop fusions" "Despacito" and "Échame la Culpa" to the romantic ballad "Le pido al cielo".

== Critical reception ==
Professional ratings
Review scores
Source	Rating
AllMusic	4/5 stars
Rolling Stone	4/5 stars

Billboard named Vida one of the most anticipated albums of 2019, saying there would be "plenty of new ballads, which Fonsi sings predominantly in Spanish and delivers with an urban touch".

Year-end lists
Publication	Accolade	Ranking	Ref.
AllMusic	AllMusic Best of 2019	—N/a	

== Commercial performance ==
In the United States, Vida debuted at number 18 on the US Billboard 200 with 22,000 equivalent album units and at number one on the Top Latin Albums chart and on the Latin Pop Albums chart.

== Track listing ==
Adapted from iTunes.

No.	Title	Writer(s)	Length
1.	"Sola"	Luis Rodríguez; Mauricio Rengifo; Andrés Torres	3:24
2.	"Apaga la Luz"	Rodriguez; Paolo Tondo; Luis Salazar; Jovany Barreto; Tat Tong	3:32
3.	"Le Pido al Cielo"	Rodriguez; M. Rengifo; Torres	4:07
4.	"Imposible" (with Ozuna)	Rodríguez; Vicente Saavedra; M. Rengifo; Juan Carlos Ozuna Rosado; Torres	2:44
5.	"Poco a Poco"	Rodriguez; M. Rengifo; Torres	2:55
6.	"Dime Que No Te Irás"	Rodriguez; Ferras Alquasi; Claudia Menkarski	4:21
7.	"Échame la Culpa" (with Demi Lovato)	Rodríguez; Alejandro Rengifo; M. Rengifo; Torres	2:53
8.	"Tanto para Nada"	Rodriguez; Torres; Menkarski	3:50
9.	"Despacito" (featuring Daddy Yankee)	Rodríguez; Erika Ender; Ramón Ayala	3:49
10.	"Más Fuerte Que Yo"	Rodriguez; Torres; Ximena Munoz	3:49
11.	"Calypso" (featuring Stefflon Don)	Rodríguez; Oladayo Olatunji; M. Rengifo; Torres; Stephanie Allen	3:20
12.	"Ahí Estás Tú"	Rodriguez; Torres	3:22
13.	"Despacito" (Remix) (with Daddy Yankee featuring Justin Bieber)	Rodríguez; Ender; Ayala; Justin Bieber; Jason Boyd; Marty James	3:50
14.	"Calypso" (Remix) (featuring Karol G)	Rodríguez; Olatunji; M. Rengifo; Torres; Allen	3:05
15.	"Sola" (English version)	Rodríguez; M. Rengifo; Torres; Ross Golan	3:24
Total length:			52:25

== Charts ==
=== Weekly charts ===
Chart (2019)	Peak position
Argentinian Albums (CAPIF)	1
Austrian Albums (Ö3 Austria)	41
Belgian Albums (Ultratop Flanders)	64
Belgian Albums (Ultratop Wallonia)	114
Canadian Albums (Billboard)	47
Chilean Albums (Punto Musical)	1
Czech Albums (ČNS IFPI)	83
Dutch Albums (Album Top 100)	91
French Albums (SNEP)	76
German Albums (Offizielle Top 100)	27
Italian Albums (FIMI)	89
Portuguese Albums (AFP)	29
Spanish Albums (PROMUSICAE)	1
South American Albums (Prensario)	1
Swiss Albums (Schweizer Hitparade)	6
US Billboard 200	18
US Top Latin Albums (Billboard)	1
US Latin Pop Albums (Billboard)	1

Chart (2025)	Peak position
Portuguese Streaming Albums (AFP)	197

=== Year-end charts ===
Chart (2019)	Position
Spanish Albums (PROMUSICAE)	46
US Top Latin Albums (Billboard)	6
Chart (2020)	Position
US Top Latin Albums (Billboard)	17
Chart (2021)	Position
US Top Latin Albums (Billboard)	26

== Certifications ==
Region	Certification	Certified units/sales
Brazil (Pro-Música Brasil)	2× Diamond	320,000^{‡}
Denmark (IFPI Danmark)	Gold	10,000^{‡}
France (SNEP)	Gold	50,000^{‡}
Italy (FIMI)	Gold	25,000^{‡}
Poland (ZPAV)	2× Platinum	40,000^{‡}
Singapore (RIAS)	Platinum	10,000^{*}
Spain (Promusicae)	Gold	20,000^{‡}
United States (RIAA)	22× Platinum (Latin)	1,320,000^{‡}
^{*} Sales figures based on certification alone.^{‡} Sales+streaming figures based on certification alone.
