= Comenzaré =

Studio album by Luis Fonsi
- Released: September 15, 1998
- Recorded: 1997–1998
- Genre: Latin pop; R&B; rock en español
- Length: 38:07
- Label: Universal Latino

Luis Fonsi chronology
Comenzaré (1998)	Eterno (2000)

Singles from Comenzaré
- 1. "Dime Como" Released: July 27, 1998; 2. "Perdóname" Released: October 12, 1998; 3. "Si Tú Quisieras" Released: February 8, 1999; 4. "Me Iré" Released: May 10, 1999

Professional ratings
Review scores
Source	Rating
AllMusic	3/5 stars

Comenzaré (I Will Start), released in 1998, is the debut album by Luis Fonsi. The album was certified Disco de Platino for selling 100,000 copies in the United States.

== Track listing ==
1. "Si Tú Quisieras" – 4:25
2. "Comenzaré" – 3:53
3. "Perdóname" – 3:57
4. "Tu Calor" – 3:53
5. "Dime Cómo" – 3:42
6. "Yo Frente Al Amor" – 3:15
7. "Por Ella" – 3:40
8. "Tres Veces No" – 3:26
9. "Me Iré" – 3:37
10. "Ya No Sé Querer" – 4:19

== Charts ==
Chart (1999)	Peak position
Billboard Top Latin Albums	27
Billboard Latin Pop Albums	12

Chart (1998–1999)	Song	Peak
Billboard Hot Latin Tracks	"Dime Como"	23
Billboard Hot Latin Tracks	"Si Tu Quisieras"	9
Billboard Hot Latin Tracks	"Perdoname"	17
Billboard Hot Latin Tracks	"Me Ire"	19

== Sales and certifications ==
Region	Certification	Certified units/sales
United States (RIAA)	Platinum (Latin)	100,000^{^}
^{^} Shipments figures based on certification alone.
