= Nada Es Para Siempre =

Single by Luis Fonsi

from the album Paso a Paso
- Released: May 24, 2005
- Recorded: 2005
- Genre: Latin rock; Latin ballad
- Length: 3:59
- Label: Universal Latino
- Songwriter: Amaury Gutiérrez
- Producer: Sebastián Krys

Luis Fonsi singles chronology
"Por Ti Podría Morir" (2004)	"Nada Es Para Siempre" (2005)	"Estoy Perdido" (2005)

Music video
- "Nada Es Para Siempre" on YouTube

"Nada Es Para Siempre" (English: Nothing Is Forever) is a ballad written by Amaury Gutiérrez, produced by Sebastián Krys and performed by Puerto Rican-American singer-songwriter Luis Fonsi. It was released as the first single from sixth studio album Paso a Paso (2005). The song was the third number-one hit for Luis Fonsi. The song was featured in the soundtrack of Mexican telenovela Rebelde.

== Background ==
The song was dedicated to Luis Fonsi's wife, Adamari López, who at the time had been diagnosed with breast cancer. The song was the second single released from the album, Paso a Paso, after "Estoy Perdido". "Nada Es Para Siempre" received a nomination for Pop Song of the Year at the Premios Lo Nuestro 2006 awards and another nomination at the 2006 Latin Billboard Music Awards for Latin Pop Airplay Song of the Year – Male.

== Chart performance ==
"Nada Es Para Siempre" reached number-one during the week of August 27, 2005, interrupting Shakira and Alejandro Sanz's "La Tortura" consecutive number-one weeks. This was the first time that Luis Fonsi had crossed over to the US Billboard Hot 100 which peaked at number 90.

Chart (2005)	Peak position
Billboard Hot 100	90
Billboard Hot Latin Tracks	1
Billboard Latin Tropical/Salsa Airplay	1

=== Covers ===
- "Nada Es Para Siempre" [Reggaeton version] (featuring Adassa) – 3:40
- "Nada Es Para Siempre" [Salsa version] – 4:51

== Certifications ==
Region	Certification	Certified units/sales
Brazil (Pro-Música Brasil)	Gold	30,000^{‡}
^{‡} Sales+streaming figures based on certification alone.
