= Luis Fonsi =

Puerto Rican singer (born 1978)

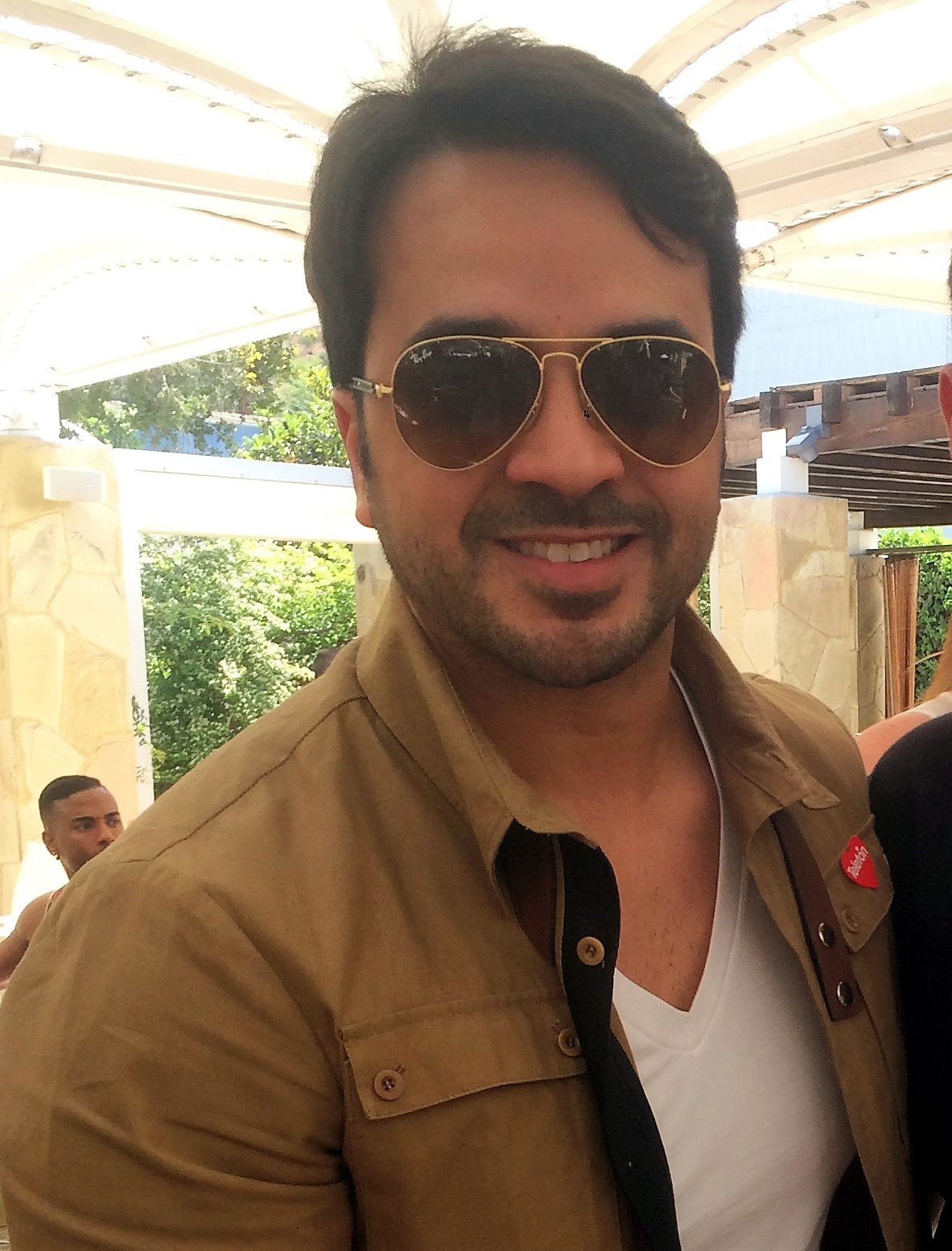
- Fonsi in 2015
- Born: Luis Alfonso Rodríguez López-Cepero; April 15, 1978 (age 48); San Juan, Puerto Rico
- Citizenship: United States
- Education: Dr. Phillips High School
- Occupations: Singer; songwriter
- Years active: 1997–present
- Spouses: Adamari López (m. 2006; div. 2010) Águeda López (m. 2014)
- Children: 2
- Relatives: Jean Rodríguez (brother)
- Musical career
- Origin: Orlando, Florida, United States
- Genres: Latin pop; rock; reggaeton; pop; pop rock; contemporary R&B; acoustic
- Label: Universal Latin
- Website: www.luisfonsi.com

Luis Alfonso Rodríguez López-Cepero (born April 15, 1978), known by his stage name Luis Fonsi (Spanish pronunciation: [ˈlwis ˈfonsi]), is a Puerto Rican singer. He is known for his soulful and dance oriented songs, most notably 2017's "Despacito".

Fonsi received his first Latin Grammy Award nominations in the Record of the Year category and won Song of the Year thanks to the song "Aquí Estoy Yo". The song also won three Billboard Latin Music Awards. "Despacito" became Fonsi's biggest success, winning four Latin Grammy Awards, seven Billboard Latin Music Awards, five Billboard Music Awards and three Grammy Awards nominations. He also won one Latin American Music Award for "Échame la Culpa" with Demi Lovato.

As of 2018, Fonsi has broken six Guinness World Records and sold more than 11 million records with "Despacito", whose music video was the most-watched YouTube video of all time until November 2020, with over 8 billion views.

== Early life ==
Fonsi was born on April 15, 1978, in San Juan, Puerto Rico, the oldest child of Alfonso Rodríguez and Delia López-Cepero. He has two younger siblings: Jean Rodríguez, who also is a singer, and Tatiana Rodríguez.

Growing up, Fonsi idolized the stars of the popular group Menudo, and the San Juan Children's Choir.

At the age of 10, his family decided to move from Puerto Rico and relocated to Orlando, Florida. He attended Westridge Middle School and Dr. Phillips High School, both in Orlando. During his high school years, he participated in an a cappella group called "The Big Guys". They sang at school parties and local festivals. One of the members of the group, Joey Fatone, later joined *NSYNC.

In 1995, Fonsi enrolled at Florida State University School of Music on a full scholarship, He also joined the school's choir, the Florida State University Singers, and sang with the City of Birmingham Symphony Orchestra. Eventually, he dropped out in order to pursue a career in music. Soon after, he was offered a recording contract by Universal Music Latin.

== Career ==
=== 1997–2006: Early albums ===
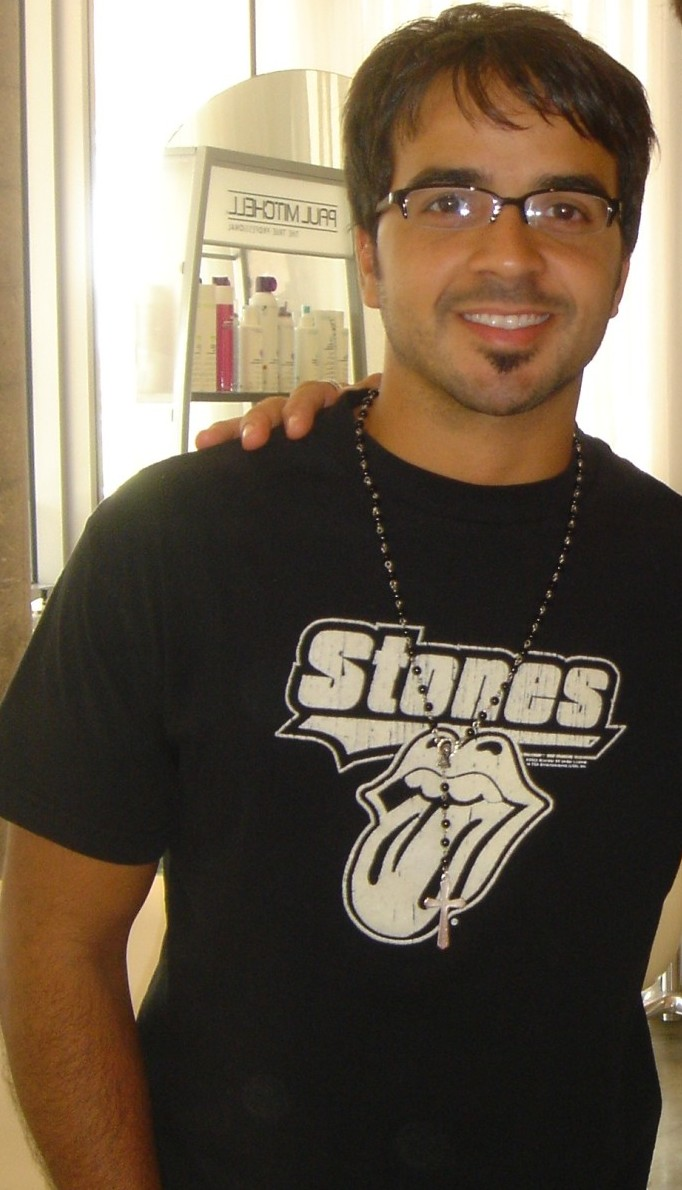
Fonsi in 2005

In 1997, Fonsi recorded his debut album, Comenzaré (I Will Begin), released in 1998. The record peaked at number 11 on Billboard's Top Latin Albums chart and contained the singles "Si Tú Quisieras", "Perdóname", "Dime Como", and "Me Iré". Comenzaré became a hit in Puerto Rico and across Latin America, with Fonsi doing well in markets like Colombia, the Dominican Republic, El Salvador, Mexico, and Venezuela. His 2000 follow-up, Eterno, was even more successful. Around this time, Fonsi also recorded a duet with Christina Aguilera for her 2000 Spanish-language album, Mi Reflejo. On May 1, 2000, Fonsi performed at the Great Jubilee Concert for a Debt-Free World, an outdoor concert in Rome, attended by Pope John Paul II. That same year, Ednita Nazario won a Latin Grammy Award for a song composed by Fonsi. He also performed with other artists at the White House in honor of the victims of the September 11 attacks.

In 2002, Fonsi was the opening act for Britney Spears' Dream Within a Dream Tour in the US and Mexico. In the same year he debuted his English album "Fight The Feeling" trying to do a crossover with the first single "Secret" featuring Joey Fatone in the video. In 2003, Luis Fonsi performed to billions of viewers across the globe at Miss World 2003 in China.

His fifth CD, Abrazar la vida, sold very well, which opened new markets in Europe. "¿Quién Te Dijo Eso?" reached number one on the Billboard Latin charts. During his time in the studio for the next album, Fonsi recorded "Amazing", a duet with Spice Girl Emma Bunton for her 2004 album Free Me. His sixth CD, Paso a Paso, debuted at number one and sent him into international markets. "Nada Es Para Siempre" also reached number one on the music charts, and was a nominee for the Latin Grammy Awards. In 2006, he contributed to El Piruli, a tribute album honoring Víctor Yturbe, singing a classic bolero, "Historia de un Amor".

=== 2007–2015: Palabras del Silencio, Tierra Firme, and 8 ===
In 2007, Luis Fonsi was selected to be part of the jury of the new version of the Latino boy band Menudo. The band would be a fusion of urban, pop and rock music in English and Spanish to produce several albums with the label of Sony BMG Epic Records. Several auditions were held in different cities such as Los Angeles, Dallas, Miami, New York, among others. Fonsi was a part of the Dallas competition where along the side of radio announcer Daniel Luna they chose various contestants and in their pickings, rising star JC Gonzalez was 1 of the 25 selected. His sound producer was named Mariano Zunino from Argentina but moved to Florida.

His seventh CD, Palabras del Silencio, debuted and stayed in the number one position for many weeks. Luis Fonsi entered the US Billboard Hot 100 for the first time in September 2008 with his song "No Me Doy por Vencido", debuting at number 98 and peaking at number 92. It reached number one on the Billboard Hot Latin Tracks chart, one of his biggest hits to date. "No Me Doy por Vencido" became Billboard's "Latin Pop Song of the Decade", and spent 21 weeks at number one on the Hot Latin Songs chart.

In November 2009, Luis Fonsi was awarded a Latin Grammy Award for "Song of the Year" for his composition "Aquí Estoy Yo".

On December 11, 2009, Fonsi performed at the Nobel Peace Prize Concert in Oslo, honoring recipient President Barack Obama.

In 2011, Fonsi released the album Tierra Firme, and went on tour to promote it throughout Latin America.

On July 9, 2011, Billboard named Fonsi "Leader of Latin Music's New Generation".

In 2014, Fonsi released his album 8, a reference to his eighth career album. He then did a tour named "Somos Uno" in 2014–15. He also mentioned that acting would be on his career path and that he wouldn't mind acting with Mexican actors and actresses.

=== 2017–present: "Despacito" and international success ===
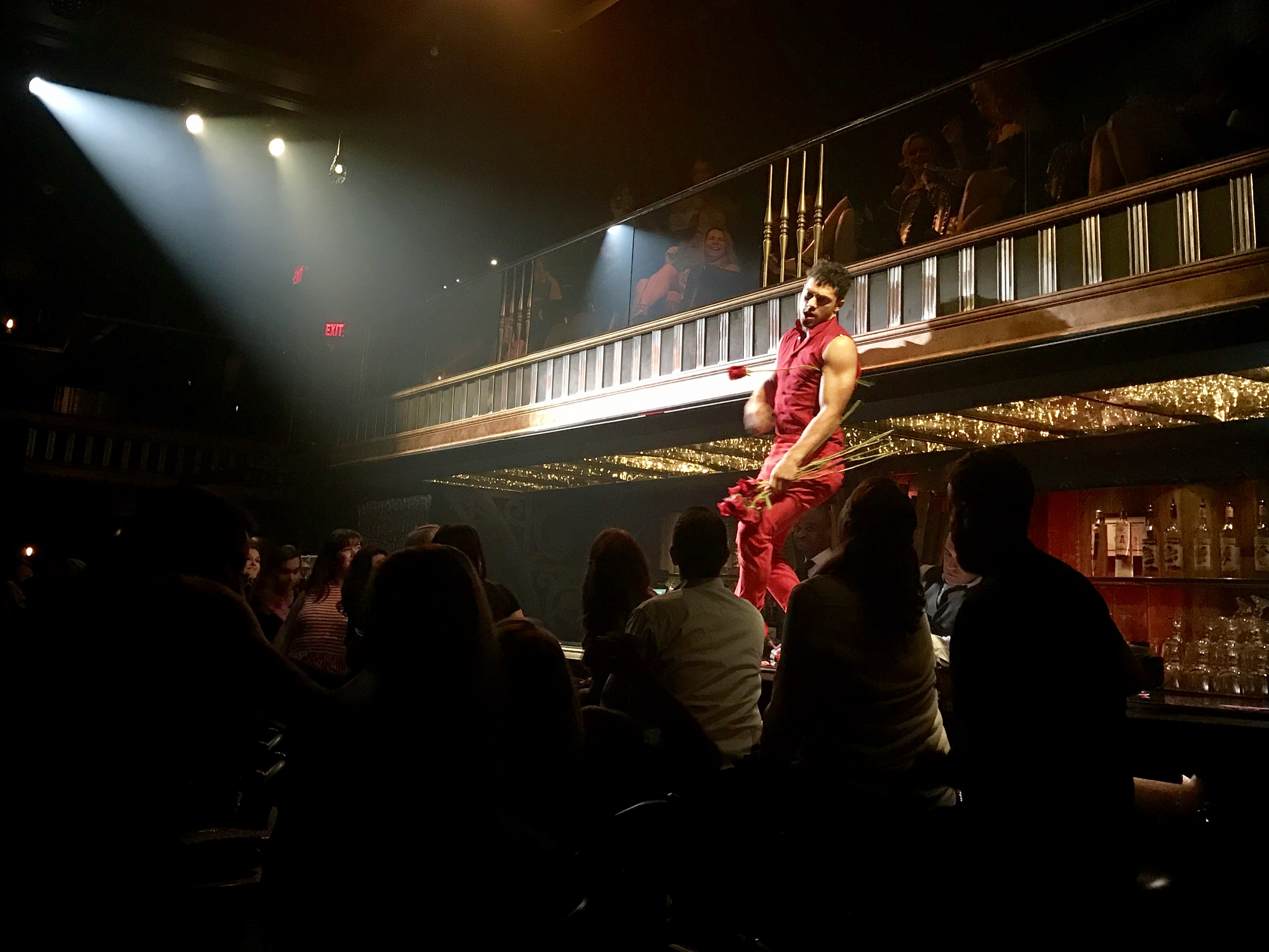
Fonsi in concert

In January 2017, "Despacito" featuring Daddy Yankee was promoted and released. On April 5, 2018, the music video reached five billion views on YouTube, with the song becoming number one in nearly every Latin Billboard chart, and the most viewed video in the world. In April 2017, the song was given an English remix featuring Canadian singer Justin Bieber. The remix featuring Bieber reached number one on the US Billboard Hot 100 for the week ending May 27, 2017, becoming both Fonsi and Yankee's first number one on the chart, and Bieber's fifth. Bieber promoted the remix at one of his shows in Puerto Rico, inviting Fonsi onto stage to perform the duet with him. The song remained number one for 16 consecutive weeks, tying One Sweet Day, by Mariah Carey and Boyz II Men as the longest reigning top song in the chart's history.

On August 15, 2017, Fonsi was named the tourism ambassador of Puerto Rico.

In November 2017, he released the song "Échame la Culpa", featuring Demi Lovato, which debuted at number three on the Hot Latin chart. The song won Song of the Year at the Latin American Music Awards of 2018 and received one nomination for Best Latin at the MTV Video Music Awards. As of 2018, the song had sold more than 1 million copies worldwide.

In June 2018, Fonsi released the single "Calypso", with Stefflon Don. The song peaked at number 11 on the Hot Latin chart. On November 2, 2018, he collaborated on the track "Baby" by Clean Bandit from their second studio album. The song peaked at number 13 on the Billboard Hot Dance/Electronic Songs chart and at number 15 on the UK Singles Chart.

In October 2018, he collaborated with Italian singer Eros Ramazzotti for the song "Per le strade una canzone", from the album Vita ce n'è.

On January 13, 2019, the singer joined with Wisin, Alejandra Guzmán and Carlos Vives as coaches of the first Spanish season of La Voz by Telemundo.

After five years since 8, on February 1, 2019, his 10th studio album, Vida was released. The track list contains "Despacito (Remix) ", "Échame la Culpa" and "Sola". The album topped the Billboard Top Latin Albums chart and Spanish albums chart, and entered at number 18 on the Billboard 200.

In 2019, Fonsi performed "Right Where I'm Supposed to Be" as the official song of the 2019 Special Olympics World Summer Games in Abu Dhabi, United Arab Emirates in collaboration with Ryan Tedder, Avril Lavigne, Hussain Al Jassmi, Assala Nasri and Tamer Hosny.

On July 26, 2019, Fonsi performed at the opening ceremony of the 2019 Pan American Games in Lima, Peru. He sang his songs including his worldwide hit "Despacito" at the ceremony. In November 2023, Fonsi was a guest narrator at Disney's Candlelight Processional at Walt Disney World. In August 2025, it was announced that he would be returning as a guest narrator for the Candlelight Processional on December 23 and 24, 2025.

== Film and television appearances ==
In 2004, Fonsi made his second acting appearance on the Mexican telenovela named Corazones al límite in which he played Roy. He also had a special appearance in 2001 on the Nickelodeon television series Taina. Fonsi joined the cast of Broadway's Forever Tango for a two-week engagement in August 2013

Fonsi has been featured as a coach on three versions of The Voice worldwide. From 2015 to 2016, he was a coach on The Voice Chile. From 2019 to 2020, he was a coach on La Voz America, winning the 2019 season with his artist Jeidimar Rijos. In 2019, and again from 2021 to 2024, Fonsi was a coach on La Voz Spain, winning the 2023 season with his artist Elsa Tortonda.

In 2024, Fonsi voiced the main character in the Dominican animated film Captain Avispa.He also starred as the lead in the 2024 romantic comedy Say a Little Prayer.

In 2026, he debuted as a coach on La Voz Kids Spain.

== Personal life ==
In 2003, Fonsi started to become romantically interested in actress Adamari López, who, as a Univision artist and fellow Puerto Rican, constantly found herself near Fonsi. That same year, Fonsi released the song "Abrazar la vida" ("To Embrace the Life"), off the eponymous album. The song would later become one of López's favorites.

During 2005, Fonsi was in the middle of an international tour that was abruptly cancelled when López was diagnosed with cancer. Fonsi promised to stay by her side, and traveled with her to Mexico, Miami, and Puerto Rico for various treatment and work-related trips. She had been in remission since 2006.

On June 3, 2006, Fonsi and Adamari López were married in a religious ceremony in Guaynabo, Puerto Rico, attended by many celebrities including Joey Fatone, Charytín Goyco, Ednita Nazario and Carlos Ponce, as well as his brother Jean Rodríguez. On November 8, 2010, they officially divorced.

Fonsi and Spanish model Águeda López were married on September 10, 2014, after three years of living together. They had their first child together, a daughter, on December 20, 2011 in Miami. On December 20, 2016, they welcomed their second child, a son, the same date his first daughter was born.

In a 2024 interview, Fonsi said he has ADD.

== Philanthropy ==
Since 2008, Luis Fonsi has been an ambassador of St. Jude Children's Research Hospital, which fights against childhood cancer. In 2017, the Billboard Latin Music Awards honored him with the Spirit of Hope Award for his humanitarian work.

After Hurricane Maria struck Puerto Rico and the Dominican Republic in 2017, the singer became one of the major helpers to raise the islands from the devastation. For his contribution, he was honored with the Global Gift Philanthropy Award.

He is also a supporter of spreading Latin culture around the world.

== Discography ==
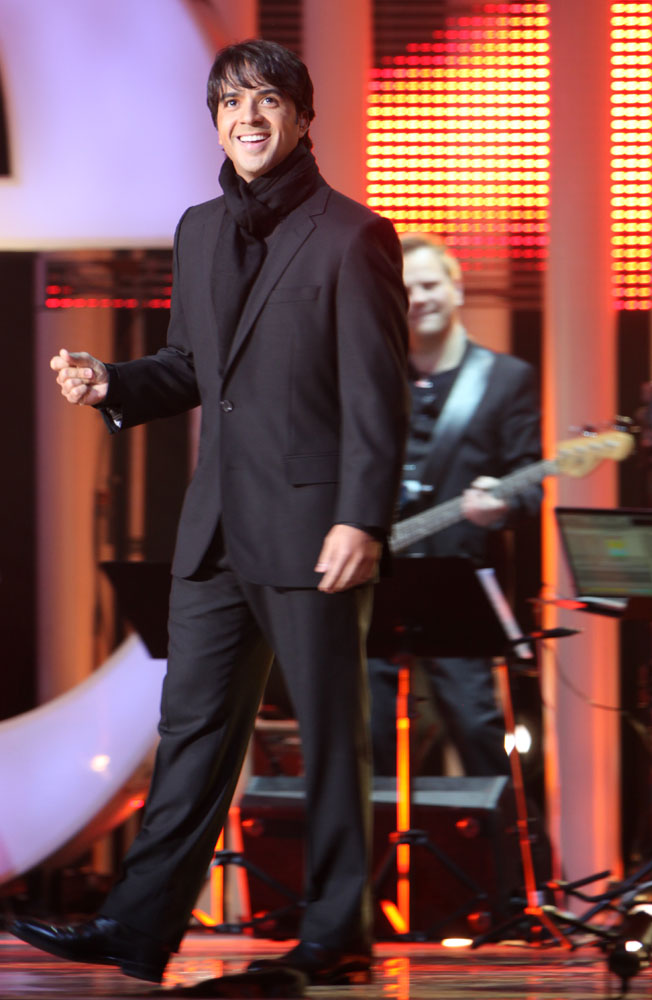
Fonsi performing in 2009

Studio albums

- Comenzaré (1998)
- Eterno (2000)
- Amor Secreto (2002)
- Fight the Feeling (2002)
- Abrazar la vida (2003)
- Paso a Paso (2005)
- Palabras del Silencio (2008)
- Tierra Firme (2011)
- 8 (2014)
- Vida (2019)
- Ley de Gravedad (2022)
- El Viaje (2024)

== Tours ==
- Comenzaré Tour (1998–99)
- Eterno Tour (2000–01)
- Amor Secreto Tour (2002)
- Abrazar La Vida Tour (2003–04)
- Paso a Paso Tour (2005–06)
- Palabras del Silencio Tour (2009–10)
- Tierra Firme Tour (2011–13)
- Somos Uno Tour (2014–15)
- Love + Dance World Tour (2017–18)
- Vida World Tour (2019)
- Noche Perfecta (2022)

== Awards and nominations ==
Award/organization	Year	Nominee/work	Category	Result	Ref.
American Music Awards	2009	Luis Fonsi	Favorite Latin Artist	Nominated	
American Music Awards	2017	Luis Fonsi	Favorite Latin Artist	Nominated	
American Music Awards	2017	"Despacito" (with Daddy Yankee and Justin Bieber)	Collaboration of the Year	Won	
American Music Awards	2017	"Despacito" (with Daddy Yankee and Justin Bieber)	Favorite Pop/Rock Song	Won	
American Music Awards	2017	"Despacito" (with Daddy Yankee)	Video of the Year	Nominated	
El Premio ASCAP	2019	"Échame la Culpa"	Award Winning Songs	Won	
Berlin Music Video Awards	2025	"Buenos Aires"	Best Art Director	Nominated	
Billboard Music Awards	2018	Luis Fonsi	Top Latin Artist	Nominated	
Billboard Music Awards	2018	"Despacito" (with Daddy Yankee and Justin Bieber)	Top Hot 100 Song	Won	
Billboard Music Awards	2018	"Despacito" (with Daddy Yankee and Justin Bieber)	Top Selling Song	Won	
Billboard Music Awards	2018	"Despacito" (with Daddy Yankee and Justin Bieber)	Top Streaming Song (Audio)	Nominated	
Billboard Music Awards	2018	"Despacito" (with Daddy Yankee and Justin Bieber)	Top Streaming Song (Video)	Won	
Billboard Music Awards	2018	"Despacito" (with Daddy Yankee and Justin Bieber)	Top Collaboration	Won	
Billboard Music Awards	2018	"Despacito" (with Daddy Yankee and Justin Bieber)	Top Latin Song	Won	
Billboard Latin Music Awards	2006	"Nada Es Para Siempre"	Latin Pop Airplay Song of the Year – Male	Nominated	
Billboard Latin Music Awards	2006	Paso A Paso	Latin Pop Album of the Year – Male	Nominated	
Billboard Latin Music Awards	2009	Luis Fonsi	Your World Award (Premio Tu Mundo)	Won	
Billboard Latin Music Awards	2009	"No Me Doy por Vencido"	Hot Latin Song of the Year	Nominated	
Billboard Latin Music Awards	2009	"No Me Doy por Vencido"	Hot Latin Song of the Year- Male	Nominated	
Billboard Latin Music Awards	2009	"No Me Doy por Vencido"	Latin Pop Airplay Song of the Year, Male	Nominated	
Billboard Latin Music Awards	2009	Palabras del Silencio	Latin Pop Album of the Year, Solo	Nominated	
Billboard Latin Music Awards	2010	Luis Fonsi	Artist of the Year	Nominated	
Billboard Latin Music Awards	2010	Luis Fonsi	Latin Pop Airplay Artist of the Year, Male	Won	
Billboard Latin Music Awards	2010	Luis Fonsi	Hot Latin Songs Artist of the Year, Male	Nominated	
Billboard Latin Music Awards	2010	Luis Fonsi	Latin Pop Albums Artist of the Year, Solo	Won	
Billboard Latin Music Awards	2010	"Aqui Estoy Yo" (with Aleks Syntek, Noel Schajris and David Bisbal)	Latin Pop Airplay Song of the Year	Won	
Billboard Latin Music Awards	2010	"No Me Doy por Vencido" (Banda Versión)	Latin Master Ringtone of the Year	Nominated	
Billboard Latin Music Awards	2017	Luis Fonsi	Spirit Of Hope	Won	
Billboard Latin Music Awards	2018	Luis Fonsi	Artist of the Year	Nominated	
Billboard Latin Music Awards	2018	Luis Fonsi	Hot Latin Songs Artist of the Year, Male	Won	
Billboard Latin Music Awards	2018	Luis Fonsi	Latin Pop Artist of the Year, Solo	Nominated	
Billboard Latin Music Awards	2018	Luis Fonsi	Songwriter of the Year	Nominated	
Billboard Latin Music Awards	2018	"Despacito" (with Daddy Yankee and Justin Bieber)	Hot Latin Song of the Year	Won	
Billboard Latin Music Awards	2018	"Despacito" (with Daddy Yankee and Justin Bieber)	Hot Latin Song of the Year, Vocal Event	Won	
Billboard Latin Music Awards	2018	"Despacito" (with Daddy Yankee and Justin Bieber)	Airplay Song of the Year	Won	
Billboard Latin Music Awards	2018	"Despacito" (with Daddy Yankee and Justin Bieber)	Digital Song of the Year	Won	
Billboard Latin Music Awards	2018	"Despacito" (with Daddy Yankee and Justin Bieber)	Streaming Song of the Year	Won	
Billboard Latin Music Awards	2018	"Despacito" (with Daddy Yankee and Justin Bieber)	Latin Pop Song of the Year	Won	
Billboard Latin Music Awards	2019	"Echáme La Culpa" (with Demi Lovato)	Latin Pop Song of the Year	Nominated	
Billboard Latin Music Awards	2020	"Despacito" (with Daddy Yankee)	Latin Song of the Decade	Won	
Billboard Latin Music Awards	2020	Luis Fonsi	Latin Pop Artist of the Year, Solo	Won	
Billboard Latin Music Awards	2020	"Date La Vuelta" (with Sebastián Yatra & Nicky Jam)	Latin Pop Song of the Year	Nominated	
Billboard Latin Music Awards	2020	Vida	Top Latin Album of the Year	Nominated	
Billboard Latin Music Awards	2020	Vida	Latin Pop Album of the Year	Won	
Billboard Latin Music Awards	2021	Luis Fonsi	Latin Pop Artist of the Year	Nominated	
Billboard Latin Music Awards	2024	Luis Fonsi	Latin Pop Artist of the Year	Nominated	
Billboard Latin Music Awards	2025	Luis Fonsi	Latin Pop Artist of the Year	Nominated	
BMI Latin Awards	2018	Luis Fonsi	President's Award	Won	
BMI Latin Awards	2018	"Despacito" (with Daddy Yankee and Justin Bieber)	Contemporary Latin Song of the Year	Won	
BMI Latin Awards	2018	"Despacito" (with Daddy Yankee and Justin Bieber)	Award Winning Songs	Won	
BMI Latin Awards	2018	"Despacito" (with Daddy Yankee)	Award Winning Songs	Won	
Grammy Awards	2009	Palabras del Silencio	Best Latin Pop Album	Nominated	
Grammy Awards	2018	"Despacito (Remix)"	Record of the Year	Nominated	
Grammy Awards	2018	"Despacito (Remix)"	Song of the Year	Nominated	
Grammy Awards	2018	"Despacito (Remix)"	Best Pop Duo/Group Performance	Nominated	
Grammy Awards	2020	Vida	Best Latin Pop Album	Nominated	
Grammy Awards	2025	El Viaje	Best Latin Pop Album	Nominated	
Heat Latin Music Awards	2019	Luis Fonsi	Best Male Artist	Nominated	
Heat Latin Music Awards	2019	"Échame la Culpa" (with Demi Lovato)	Best Video	Nominated	
Heat Latin Music Awards	2020	Luis Fonsi	Best Pop Artist	Nominated	
Heat Latin Music Awards	2021	Luis Fonsi	Best Pop Artist	Nominated	
Heat Latin Music Awards	2022	Luis Fonsi	Best Pop Artist	Nominated	
Heat Latin Music Awards	2024	Luis Fonsi	Best Pop Artist	Nominated	
Heat Latin Music Awards	2024	"La Paz" (with Adriel Favela)	Best Song for Video Games, TV Series or Movies	Nominated	
Heat Latin Music Awards	2025	"Mi Amor" (with Juan Luis Guerra 4:40 & Joy)	Best Song for Video Games, TV Series or Movies	Nominated	
iHeartRadio Music Awards	2018	"Despacito" (with Daddy Yankee and Justin Bieber)	Song of the Year	Nominated	
iHeartRadio Music Awards	2018	"Despacito" (with Daddy Yankee and Justin Bieber)	Best Collaboration	Nominated	
iHeartRadio Music Awards	2018	"Despacito" (with Daddy Yankee and Justin Bieber)	Best Remix	Nominated	
iHeartRadio Music Awards	2018	Luis Fonsi	Latin Artist of the Year	Won	
iHeartRadio Music Awards	2018	"Despacito" (with Daddy Yankee)	Latin Song of the Year	Won	
iHeartRadio Music Awards	2018	"Despacito" (with Daddy Yankee)	Best Lyrics	Nominated	
iHeartRadio Music Awards	2019	"Échame la Culpa" (with Demi Lovato)	Latin Song of the Year	Nominated	
iHeartRadio Titanium Awards	2017	"Despacito" (with Daddy Yankee and Justin Bieber)	1 Billion Total Audience Spins on iHeartRadio Stations	Won	
Latin America Music Awards	2017	Luis Fonsi	Artist of the Year	Nominated	
Latin America Music Awards	2017	Luis Fonsi	Favorite Pop/Rock Male Artist	Nominated	
Latin America Music Awards	2017	"Despacito" (with Daddy Yankee and Justin Bieber)	Song of the Year	Nominated	
Latin America Music Awards	2017	"Despacito" (with Daddy Yankee and Justin Bieber)	Favorite Pop/Rock Song	Nominated	
Latin America Music Awards	2017	"Despacito" (with Daddy Yankee and Justin Bieber)	Favorite Collaboration	Nominated	
Latin America Music Awards	2018	Luis Fonsi	Artist of the Year	Nominated	
Latin America Music Awards	2018	Luis Fonsi	Favorite Pop Artist	Nominated	
Latin America Music Awards	2018	"Échame La Culpa" (with Demi Lovato)	Song of the Year	Won	
Latin America Music Awards	2018	"Échame La Culpa" (with Demi Lovato)	Favorite Pop Song	Nominated	
Latin America Music Awards	2019	Luis Fonsi	Favorite Pop Artist	Nominated	
Latin America Music Awards	2019	Vida	Album of the Year	Nominated	
Latin America Music Awards	2019	Vida	Favorite Pop Album	Nominated	
Latin America Music Awards	2019	"Imposible" (with Ozuna)	Favorite Pop Song	Nominated	
Latin America Music Awards	2021	Luis Fonsi	Favorite Pop Artist	Nominated	
Latin America Music Awards	2022	Luis Fonsi	Favorite Pop Artist	Nominated	
Latin America Music Awards	2023	Luis Fonsi	Favorite Pop Artist	Nominated	
Latin Grammy Awards	2009	"Aquí Estoy Yo" (with Aleks Syntek, Noel Schajris and David Bisbal)	Record of the Year	Nominated	
Latin Grammy Awards	2009	"Aquí Estoy Yo" (with Aleks Syntek, Noel Schajris and David Bisbal)	Song of the Year	Won	
Latin Grammy Awards	2011	"Gritar"	Record of the Year	Nominated	
Latin Grammy Awards	2014	"Llegaste Tú" (with Juan Luis Guerra)	Record of the Year	Nominated	
Latin Grammy Awards	2017	"Despacito" (with Daddy Yankee)	Record of the Year	Won	
Latin Grammy Awards	2017	"Despacito" (with Daddy Yankee)	Best Short Form Music Video	Won	
Latin Grammy Awards	2017	"Despacito" (with Daddy Yankee)	Song of the Year	Won	
Latin Grammy Awards	2017	"Despacito" (with Daddy Yankee and Justin Bieber)	Best Urban/Fusion Performance	Won	
Latin Grammy Awards	2019	Vida	Album of the Year	Nominated	
Latin Grammy Awards	2024	El Viaje	Best Pop Vocal Album	Won	
LOS40 Music Awards	2017	Luis Fonsi	Best Latin Act	Nominated	
LOS40 Music Awards	2017	"Despacito" (with Daddy Yankee and Justin Bieber)	International Song of the Year	Won	
LOS40 Music Awards	2017	"Despacito" (with Daddy Yankee)	International Video of the Year	Nominated	
LOS40 Music Awards	2017	"Despacito" (with Daddy Yankee)	LOS40 Global Show Award	Nominated	
LOS40 Music Awards	2017	"Despacito" (with Daddy Yankee and Justin Bieber)	Golden Music Award	Won	
MTV Europe Music Awards	2017	"Despacito" (with Daddy Yankee)	Best Song	Nominated	
MTV Millennial Awards	2017	"Despacito" (with Daddy Yankee and Justin Bieber)	Collaboration of the Year	Nominated	
MTV Millennial Awards	2017	"Despacito" (with Daddy Yankee and Justin Bieber)	Best Party Anthem	Won	
MTV Millennial Awards	2018	"Échame La Culpa" (with Demi Lovato)	Hit of the Year	Nominated	
MTV Video Music Awards	2017	"Despacito" (with Daddy Yankee and Justin Bieber)	Song of Summer	Nominated	
MTV Video Music Awards	2018	"Échame La Culpa" (with Demi Lovato)	Best Latin	Nominated	
Premios Juventud	2006	Luis Fonsi	Favorite Pop Star	Nominated	
Premios Juventud	2006	Luis Fonsi	He's Got Style Award	Nominated	
Premios Juventud	2006	Luis Fonsi & Adamari López	Hottest Romance	Won	
Premios Juventud	2007	Luis Fonsi	Favorite Pop Star	Nominated	
Premios Juventud	2007	Luis Fonsi	He's Got Style Award	Won	
Premios Juventud	2009	Luis Fonsi	Voice of the Moment	Won	
Premios Juventud	2009	Luis Fonsi	Favorite Pop Artist	Won	
Premios Juventud	2009	Luis Fonsi	My Idol Is	Won	
Premios Juventud	2009	Luis Fonsi	What a Hottie!	Nominated	
Premios Juventud	2009	Luis Fonsi	He's Got Style Award	Won	
Premios Juventud	2009	Luis Fonsi & Adamari López	Hottest Romance	Won	
Premios Juventud	2009	"Aquí Estoy Yo" (with Aleks Syntek, Noel Schajris and David Bisbal)	The Perfect Combination	Won	
Premios Juventud	2009	"Aquí Estoy Yo" (with Aleks Syntek, Noel Schajris and David Bisbal)	My favorite Video	Won	
Premios Juventud	2009	"Aquí Estoy Yo" (with Aleks Syntek, Noel Schajris and David Bisbal)	Catchiest Tune	Won	
Premios Juventud	2009	"Aquí Estoy Yo" (with Aleks Syntek, Noel Schajris and David Bisbal)	Best Ballad	Nominated	
Premios Juventud	2009	"No Me Doy Por Vencido"	Best Ballad	Won	
Premios Juventud	2009	"No Me Doy Por Vencido"	The Perfect Combination	Won	
Premios Juventud	2009	"No Me Doy Por Vencido"	My Ringtone	Nominated	
Premios Juventud	2009	Palabras del Silencio	CD To Die For	Won	
Premios Juventud	2010	Luis Fonsi	Voice of the Moment	Nominated	
Premios Juventud	2010	Luis Fonsi	My Favorite Concert	Nominated	
Premios Juventud	2010	Luis Fonsi	Favorite Pop Artist	Nominated	
Premios Juventud	2010	Luis Fonsi	What a Hottie!	Nominated	
Premios Juventud	2010	Luis Fonsi & Adamari López	Hottest Romance	Won	
Premios Juventud	2012	Luis Fonsi	Follow me The Good	Nominated	
Premios Juventud	2012	Luis Fonsi	My Favorite Concert	Nominated	
Premios Juventud	2012	Luis Fonsi	Favorite Pop Artist	Nominated	
Premios Juventud	2012	Luis Fonsi	Best Moves	Nominated	
Premios Juventud	2012	Tierra Firme	Everything I touch it	Nominated	
Premios Juventud	2012	Tierra Firme	My Favorite Concert	Nominated	
Premios Juventud	2012	"Respira"	Best Ballad	Nominated	
Premios Juventud	2017	"Despacito" (with Daddy Yankee)	The Perfect Combination	Won	
Premios Juventud	2017	"Despacito" (with Daddy Yankee)	Best Song For Singing	Won	
Premios Juventud	2019	"Imposible" (with Ozuna)	Best Song: Singing in the Shower	Nominated	
Premios Juventud	2021	"Girasoles"	Video with the Best Social Message	Nominated	
Premios Juventud	2023	"Vacaciones" (with Manuel Turizo)	Best Pop/Urban Collaboration	Nominated	
Premios Juventud	2023	Ley De Gravedad	Best Pop/Urban Album	Nominated	
Premios Juventud	2025	El Viaje	Best Pop Album	Nominated	
Premios Juventud	2025	"Roma" (with Laura Pausini)	Best Pop/Ballad Song	Nominated	
Premios Juventud	2025	"Santa Marta" (with Carlos Vives)	Tropical Mix	Nominated	
Premios Juventud	2026	"Cambiaré" (with Feid)	Best Pop/Rhythmic Song	Pending	
Premio Lo Nuestro	2005	Luis Fonsi	Male Artist of the Year – Pop	Nominated	
Premio Lo Nuestro	2005	Abrazar la Vida	Album of the Year – Pop	Nominated	
Premio Lo Nuestro	2006	Luis Fonsi	Male Artist of the Year – Pop	Won	
Premio Lo Nuestro	2006	"Nada Es Para Siempre"	Song of the Year – Pop	Nominated	
Premio Lo Nuestro	2006	"Nada Es Para Siempre"	Video of the Year	Won	
Premio Lo Nuestro	2006	Paso a Paso	Album of the Year – Pop	Nominated	
Premio Lo Nuestro	2007	Luis Fonsi	Male Artist of the Year – Pop	Nominated	
Premio Lo Nuestro	2007	"Por Una Mujer"	Song of the Year – Pop	Nominated	
Premio Lo Nuestro	2009	Luis Fonsi	Male Artist of the Year – Pop	Won	
Premio Lo Nuestro	2010	Luis Fonsi	Artist of the Year	Nominated	
Premio Lo Nuestro	2010	Luis Fonsi	Male Artist of the Year – Pop	Won	
Premio Lo Nuestro	2010	"Aquí Estoy Yo" (with Aleks Syntek, Noel Schajris and David Bisbal)	Collaboration of the Year	Won	
Premio Lo Nuestro	2010	"Aquí Estoy Yo" (with Aleks Syntek, Noel Schajris and David Bisbal)	Song of the Year – Pop	Won	
Premio Lo Nuestro	2012	"Respira"	Video of the Year	Nominated	
Premio Lo Nuestro	2013	Luis Fonsi	Male Artist of the Year – Pop	Nominated	
Premio Lo Nuestro	2016	"Llegaste Tú" (with Juan Luis Guerra)	Pop Song of the Year	Nominated	
Premio Lo Nuestro	2019	"Calypso" (with Stefflon Don)	Crossover Collaboration of the Year	Nominated	
Premio Lo Nuestro	2020	Luis Fonsi	Pop/Rock Artist of the Year	Nominated	
Premio Lo Nuestro	2020	Luis Fonsi	Pop/Ballad Artist of the Year	Won	
Premio Lo Nuestro	2020	"Imposible" (with Ozuna)	Pop/Rock Collaboration of the Year	Nominated	
Premio Lo Nuestro	2020	"Imposible" (with Ozuna)	Urban/Pop Song of the Year	Nominated	
Premio Lo Nuestro	2020	"Date La Vuelta" (with Sebastián Yatra and Nicky Jam)	Urban/Pop Song of the Year	Nominated	
Premio Lo Nuestro	2021	"Tanto" (with Jesse & Joy)	Pop Collaboration of the Year	Nominated	
Premio Lo Nuestro	2021	"Tanto" (with Jesse & Joy)	Pop Song of the Year	Nominated	
Premio Lo Nuestro	2021	"Girasoles"	Video of the Year	Nominated	
Premio Lo Nuestro	2022	Luis Fonsi	Pop Artist of the Year	Nominated	
Premio Lo Nuestro	2022	"Vacío" (with Rauw Alejandro)	Pop Collaboration of the Year	Nominated	
Premio Lo Nuestro	2022	"Se Nos Fue La Mano"	Pop Song of the Year	Nominated	
Premio Lo Nuestro	2022	"Se Nos Fue La Mano"	Pop/Ballad Song of the Year	Nominated	
Premio Lo Nuestro	2023	Luis Fonsi	Male Pop Artist of the Year	Nominated	
Premio Lo Nuestro	2023	"Vacaciones" (with Manuel Turizo)	Pop Collaboration of the Year	Nominated	
Premio Lo Nuestro	2023	"Nuestra Balada"	Pop/Ballad Song of the Year	Nominated	
Premio Lo Nuestro	2023	Ley de Gravedad	Pop Album of the Year	Nominated	
Premio Lo Nuestro	2024	Luis Fonsi	Male Pop Artist of the Year	Nominated	
Premio Lo Nuestro	2025	Luis Fonsi	Male Pop Artist of the Year	Nominated	
Premio Lo Nuestro	2025	"Santa Marta" (with Carlos Vives)	Pop Song of The Year	Nominated	
Premio Lo Nuestro	2025	"Roma" (with Laura Pausini)	Pop/Ballad Song of the Year	Nominated	
Premio Lo Nuestro	2025	El Viaje	Pop-Urban Album of The Year	Nominated	
Premio Lo Nuestro	2026	"Tocando El Cielo"	Pop/Urban – Song of the Year	Nominated	
Premio Lo Nuestro	2026	"Sabes Qué Hora Es" (with Banda Los Sebastianes De Saúl Plata)	The Perfect Mix of the Year	Nominated	
Premios Tu Música Urbano	2019	"Imposible" (with Ozuna)	Top Song - Pop Urban	Nominated	
Premios Tu Música Urbano	2019	"Imposible" (with Ozuna)	Video of the Year	Nominated	
Premios Tu Música Urbano	2020	"Date La Vuelta" (with Sebastián Yatra & Nicky Jam)	Top Song - Pop Urban	Nominated	
Premios Tu Música Urbano	2026	Luis Fonsi	Top Artist Male - Pop	Nominated	
Swiss Music Awards	2019	"Échame La Culpa" (Demi Lovato)	Best Hit International	Won	
Teen Choice Awards	2017	Luis Fonsi	Choice Latin Artist	Nominated	
Teen Choice Awards	2017	"Despacito" (with Daddy Yankee and Justin Bieber)	Choice Song: Male Artist	Nominated	
Teen Choice Awards	2017	"Despacito" (with Daddy Yankee and Justin Bieber)	Choice Latin Song	Won	
Teen Choice Awards	2017	"Despacito" (with Daddy Yankee and Justin Bieber)	Choice Summer Song	Won	
Teen Choice Awards	2018	Luis Fonsi	Choice Latin Artist	Nominated	
Teen Choice Awards	2018	"Échame La Culpa" (with Demi Lovato)	Choice Latin Song	Nominated	

== Television ==
- Amantes de Luna Llena (2000); Special appearance
- Taina (2001); Special appearance
- Corazones al límite (2004); Roy
- Llena de amor (2010); Special appearance
- The Voice Chile (2015–16); Coach
- The Tonight Show Starring Jimmy Fallon (2017, 2019); guest performer
- El hormiguero (2017, 2018, 2018 (La Voz), 2019, 2020, 2021, 2021 (La Voz), 2022, 2022 (La Voz); Guest Performer
- Lip Sync Battle (2018); Episode: "Luis Fonsi vs. Joan Smalls"
- Drop the Mic (2018); Episode: "Seth Rogen vs. Joseph Gordon-Levitt / Terry Crews vs. Luis Fonsi"
- La Voz (2019-); Coach (with Wisin, Alejandra Guzmán, Carlos Vives)
- Songland (2020)
- The Voice (2021) with Kelly Clarkson's team
- 23rd Annual Latin Grammy Awards (2022); Host (with Anitta, Laura Pausini, Thalía)

== See also ==
- List of best-selling Latin music artists
- List of Puerto Ricans
- List of composers by nationality
- List of Puerto Rican songwriters
