= Premonition =

Premonition(s) or The Premonition may refer to:

== Film and television ==
- "Premonition" (Alfred Hitchcock Presents), an episode of Alfred Hitchcock Presents (1955)
- "The Premonition" (The Outer Limits), an episode of the original version of The Outer Limits (1965)
- Premonition (1947 film), a 1947 Czech film
- Premonition (1972 film), an American horror film by Alan Rudolph
- The Premonition (1976 film), an American psychological thriller starring Richard Lynch
- Premonition (2004 film), a Japanese horror film by Tsuruta Norio
- Premonition (2005 film), a TV movie starring Catherine Oxenberg
- Premonition (2006 film), a 2006 French drama film
- Premonition (2007 film), an American drama starring Sandra Bullock

== Music ==
=== Albums ===
- Premonition (John Fogerty album), 1998
- Premonition (The Legendary Pink Dots album), 1982
- Premonition (Paul McCandless album), 1992
- Premonition (Peter Frampton album), 1986
- Premonition (Survivor album), 1981
- Premonition (Tony MacAlpine album), 1994
- Premonition (Vampire Rodents album), 1992
- The Premonition (album), by Firewind, 2008
- Premonitions (album), by Miya Folick, 2018
- Premonitions, by Blue Stahli, 2016
- Premonitions, an EP by Jehst, 1999

=== Songs ===
- "Premonition", by August Burns Red from Death Below, 2023
- "Premonition", by Chris Kline from the soundtrack of the video game Pinball Hall of Fame: The Williams Collection, 2011
- "Premonition", a track from the soundtrack of the 2015 video game Undertale by Toby Fox
- "Premonition", by Galneryus from Under the Force of Courage, 2015
- "Premonition", by Reks from Grey Hairs, 2008
- "Premonition", by Joe Satriani from Black Swans and Wormhole Wizards, 2010
- "Premonition", by Simple Minds from Real to Real Cacophony, 1979
- "Premonition", by Symphony X from Symphony X, 1994
- "Premonition", by Vicious Rumors from Soldiers of the Night, 1985
- "Premonition (Intro)", by Eminem from Music to Be Murdered By, 2020
- "The Premonition", by The Haunted from The Dead Eye, 2006

== Other uses ==
- Premonition (horse) (1950–1970), a Thoroughbred racehorse
- Premonitions (novel), a 2005 young adult novel by Jude Watson
- The Premonition (Lewis book), a 2021 book by Michael Lewis
- The Premonition (novel), a 1988 novel by Banana Yoshimoto

== See also ==
- Premonición, a 2006 album by David Bisbal
  - Premonición Live, a 2007 live album by David Bisbal
