= Aquí Estoy Yo =

Song written by Luis Fonsi, Claudia Brant and Gen Rubin

- Urban remix cover

Single by Luis Fonsi featuring Aleks Syntek, David Bisbal and Noel Schajris

from the album Palabras del Silencio
- Released: January 12, 2009
- Recorded: 2007–2008
- Studio: Angel Recording Studios; (London, England, United Kingdom); Arju Studios; Cata Studios; Hit Factory Critiera; The Warehouse Recording; The Tiki Room; Mofongo Studios; Picks and Hammers; (Miami, Florida); Cosmos Studios; Elith Studios; (Mexico City, Mexico); Junk O-M; (São Paulo, Brazil); Estudio de la Radio Nacional Eslovaca; (Bratislava, Slovakia); Olivetta Recording Studios; (Bologna, Italy); PKO Studios; (Madrid, Spain)
- Genre: Latin pop; ballad
- Length: 4:11
- Label: Universal Latino
- Songwriters: Luis Fonsi; Claudia Brant; Gen Rubin
- Producers: Luis Fonsi; Sebastián Krys

Luis Fonsi singles chronology
"No Me Doy por Vencido" (2008)	"Aquí Estoy Yo" (2009)	"Llueve Por Dentro" (2009)

Aleks Syntek singles chronology
"In My Arms" (2008)	"Aquí Estoy Yo" (2008)	"Loca" (2009)

David Bisbal singles chronology
"Hate That I Love You" (2008)	"Aquí Estoy Yo" (2008)	"Esclavo de Sus Besos" (2009)

Noel Schajris singles chronology
"Será" (2008)	"Aquí Estoy Yo" (2008)	"No Importa" (2009)

"Aquí Estoy Yo" (transl. "Here I Am") is a song written by Luis Fonsi, Claudia Brant and Gen Rubin; it was produced by Luis Fonsi and Sebastián Krys for Fonsi's seventh studio album Palabras del Silencio (2008), and it is performed by Luis Fonsi, Aleks Syntek, David Bisbal, and Noel Schajris.

It was released as the second single from Fonsi's album on January 12, 2009, and became his sixth number-one single on the Billboard Hot Latin Tracks chart, the second number-one single for David Bisbal on the same chart, and the first for Aleks Syntek and Noel Schajris (as a solo performer).

== Background ==
"Aquí Estoy Yo" was released on October 13, 2008, as the second single from Palabras del Silencio, the seventh studio album recorded by Puerto Rican singer-songwriter Luis Fonsi. This song is the follow-up to "No Me Doy por Vencido" and was written by Fonsi in 2008, according to an interview in the Mexican newspaper El Universal: "I wrote it six years ago to four male voices (the brother of Luis Fonsi and two Brazilian brothers, Rodrigo and Julian Medeiros), and in all these years, I never knew what to do with the song, I thought maybe give it to some group, but as I loved it so much, decided to keep it." About the choice to perform with Noel Schajris, David Bisbal and Aleks Syntek, Fonsi told Billboard magazine: "One day, I thought and I said, why not invite three guys, three friends, not difficult to reach them, they can talk to you one on one, because it had happened but they were my friends." While on a boat fishing with Bisbal, Syntek and Schajris, Fonsi asked them to record the track, since it was "an amazing song and the only thing I do is look at three musketeers sing to me". Fonsi thought that the diversity would help this "hymn": "We have Mexico, Argentina, Spain and Puerto Rico in the same track." During the recording, there were no rules, it was a mix of artistic styles, like a bohemian reunion with friends. On the album review, Jason Birchmeier of AllMusic declared that this was a notable song, that features a quartet of international all-stars.

== Music video ==
The music video was recorded in Mexico City in December 2008, as stated by Fonsi on his official website. It was released on January 26, 2009.

In the music video, Aleks, David, and Noel are all going to meet Fonsi to sing a song together. On their way, there they see Fonsi. When Aleks, David and Noel bump into Ludwika Paleta. When they get to Fonsi's home, Fonsi, Syntek, Bisbal, and Noel sing "Aquí Estoy Yo" altogether. Near the end, they all leave and see and Fonsi smiles at Ludwika Paleta and she smiles back.

== Track listing ==
Digital download

1. "Aquí Estoy Yo" (Urban Version) featuring Yomo – 4:28
2. "Aquí Estoy Yo" (Bachata Version)

== Chart performance ==
The song debuted on the Billboard Hot Latin Tracks chart at number 42 on February 7, 2009. and slowly climbed to number one 19 weeks later, replacing "El Amor" by Tito "El Bambino". The track became Fonsi's sixth number-one single on the chart, and the second number-one single for David Bisbal, after "¿Quién Me Iba a Decir?" in 2006. "Aquí Estoy Yo" became the first number-one single for Aleks Syntek whose previous highest rank on this chart was achieved in 2004 with "Duele el Amor", a duet with Spanish singer Ana Torroja that peaked at number two. It is also the first time that Noel Schajris reached the top position on this chart as a solo performer. With Sin Bandera, Schrajris, reached the number-one position in 2004 with "Mientes Tan Bien".

On the Billboard Latin Pop Airplay chart, this song replaced Fonsi's "No Me Doy por Vencido", which led the list for a chart-record 28 weeks. This was only the third time in the chart's history that an artist has succeeded himself at the top. Juanes' "Gotas de Agua Dulce" followed by "Me Enamora" on the February 23, 2008, and Ricky Martin's "Vuelve" gave way to "Perdido Sin Ti" on September 12, 1998.

=== Charts ===
Chart (2009)	Peak Position
Spanish Singles Charts	9
US Bubbling Under Hot 100 (Billboard)	14
US Billboard Hot Latin Tracks	1
US Billboard Latin Pop Airplay	1

== Certifications ==
Region	Certification	Certified units/sales
Spain (Promusicae)	Gold	10,000^{^}
^{^} Shipments figures based on certification alone.

== Awards ==
=== Billboard Latin Music Awards ===
- Latin Pop Airplay Song of the Year
- Latin Pop Airplay Artist of the Year – Male

=== Latin Grammy Awards ===
- Song of the Year

=== Premio Lo Nuestro ===
- Pop Song of the Year
- Collaboration of the Year
