= Sebastian Krys =

American record producer

- Also known as: Sebas Krys
- Born: November 11, 1970 (age 55)
- Origin: Buenos Aires, Argentina
- Genres: Latin pop
- Occupations: Record producer, audio engineer
- Instruments: Keyboards, organ, guitar
- Years active: 1992–present

Sebastian Krys (born November 11, 1970) is an Argentine-born American audio engineer and record producer. An eight-time Grammy and 14-time Latin Grammy winner, Krys has worked with many Spanish language pop and rock artists such as Percance, Sergio Dalma, Eros Ramazzotti, Sandy & Junior, Gloria Estefan, Carlos Vives, Shakira, Alejandro Sanz, Luis Fonsi, Vega, Kinky, Los Rabanes, Obie Bermúdez, Ricky Martin, Marc Anthony, Lori Meyers, Fangoria, La Santa Cecilia and Will Smith.

== Personal ==
Sebastian Krys (pronounced "Chris") was born in Buenos Aires, Argentina and arrived in the United States in 1980 at the age of nine as an undocumented immigrant. He became a U.S. citizen in 2012. He Lives with his wife, Pamela Krys, and sons Nick and Gabe Krys.

== Career ==
Krys started in 1992 as a recording intern at Emilio Estefan's Crescent Moon Studio in Miami, where he worked until the early 2000s. There he worked with major Latin artists such as Roberto Blades, Celia Cruz, Enrique Iglesias, David Bisbal, Ricky Martin, Arturo Sandoval, Jon Secada and, of course, Gloria Estefan.

In 2010, after moving to Los Angeles, Krys launched an independent music company called Rebeleon Entertainment.

== Selected discography ==
- Amor a la Mexicana, Thalía (1997)
- Dónde Están los Ladrones?, Shakira (1998)
- Ricky Martin, Ricky Martin (1999)
- MTV Unplugged, Shakira (2000)
- Arrasando, Thalía (2000)
- Escape, Enrique Iglesias (2001)
- Déjame Entrar, Carlos Vives (2001)
- Money Pa Que', Los Rabanes (2002)
- Confesiones, Obie Bermúdez (2003)
- Unwrapped, Gloria Estefan (2003)
- Imperfecta, JD Natasha (2004)
- El Rock de Mi Pueblo, Carlos Vives (2004)
- Paso a Paso, Luis Fonsi (2005)
- Mi Forma de Ser, Patricia Loaiza (2005)
- El Otro Lado de Mi, Soraya (2005)
- Dicen Que El Tiempo, Jennifer Pena (2006)
- Sandy e Junior 2006, Sandy & Junior (2006)
- Premonición, David Bisbal (2006)
- Ese Que Va Por Ahí, Jeremías (2006)
- VI, Los Rabanes (2007)
- E2, Eros Ramazzotti (2007)
- 9MA, Nove Mil Anjos (2008)
- Día Azul, Jimena Angel (2008)
- Palabras del Silencio, Luis Fonsi (2008)
- A Buena Hora, Sergio Dalma (2008)
- Barracuda, Kinky (2008)
- Soy, Ednita Nazario (2009)
- Metamorfosis, Vega (2009)
- Bendito Entre Las Mujeres, Vallin (2009)
- Trece, Sergio Dalma (2010)
- Extranjera, Dulce María (2010)
- Cuando el Destino Nos Alcance, Lori Meyers (2010)
- Acordes de Mi Diario, Merche (2010)
- Suddenly Yours, Allstar Weekend (2010)
- 2, Amaia Montero (2011)
- Guadalupe, The Mills (2011)
- Grandes Canciones, Noel Schajris (2011)
- La Cuenta Atras, Vega (2011)
- Tierra Firme, Luis Fonsi (2011)
- La Música No Se Toca, Alejandro Sanz (2012)
- Un mundo de colores, Merche (2012)
- Antes o después, Fangoria (2013)
- Impronta, Lori Meyers (2013)
- Montaña Rusa, Second (2013)
- Treinta Dias, La Santa Cecilia (2013)
- Wolverines, Vega (2013)
- Tú y Yo, David Bisbal (2014)
- Verte Nacer, Noel Schajris (2014)
- Someday New, La Santa Cecilia (2014)
- Sirope, Alejandro Sanz (2015)
- ¿Dónde está mi Varón?, Verónica Orozco (2016)
- Buenaventura, La Santa Cecilia (2016)
- Cicatrices, Miriam Rodríguez (2018)
- La Reina Pez, Vega (2018)
- Look Now, Elvis Costello and The Imposters (2018)

== Awards and nominations ==
As a producer and mixer, he won seven American Grammys and ten Latin Grammys. He is currently fourth in the list of the Most Latin Grammys won by a Producer, third as Most Latin Grammys won by an Engineer or Mixer and sixth as Most Latin Grammys won in a lifetime. In 2007, Krys was awarded the title of Producer of the Year. at the 8th Latin Grammy Awards In 2009, he was inducted to the Full Sail University Hall of Fame.

=== Grammy Awards ===
Year	Category	Nominated work	Artist	Result	Ref.
2001	Best Latin Pop Album	MTV Unplugged (as producer)	Shakira	Won	
2001	Best Traditional Tropical Latin Album	Alma Caribeña (as producer)	Gloria Estefan	Won	
2002	Best Traditional Tropical Latin Album	Déjame Entrar (as producer)	Carlos Vives	Won	
2005	Best Latin Pop Album	Amar Sin Mentiras (as producer)	Marc Anthony	Won	
2014	Best Latin Rock, Urban or Alternative Album	Treinta Días (as producer)	La Santa Cecilia	Won	
2020	Best Traditional Pop Vocal Album	Look Now (as producer)	Elvis Costello and The Imposters	Won	
2022	Best Latin Rock or Alternative Album	Origen (as producer)	Juanes	Won	

=== Latin Grammy Awards ===
Year	Category	Nominated work	Artist	Result	Ref.
2000	Album of the Year	El Amor de Mi Tierra (as engineer)	Carlos Vives	Nominated	
2000	Album of the Year	MTV Unplugged	Shakira	Nominated	
2000	Best Pop Album	MTV Unplugged	Shakira	Nominated	
2001	Best Engineered Album	Arrasando (as engineer)	Thalía	Won	
2002	Album of the Year	Déjame Entrar (as producer)	Carlos Vives	Nominated	
2002	Best Contemporary Tropical Album	Déjame Entrar (as producer)	Carlos Vives	Won	
2002	Record of the Year	"Déjame Entrar" (as engineer)	Carlos Vives	Nominated	
2002	Producer of the Year	Sebastian Krys		Nominated	
2003	Best Engineered Album	Money Pa' Que (as engineer)	Los Rabanes	Nominated	
2004	Producer of the Year	Sebastian Krys		Nominated	
2005	Album of the Year	Todo el Año (as producer)	Obie Bermúdez	Nominated	
2005	Best Male Pop Vocal Album	Todo el Año (as producer)	Obie Bermúdez	Won	
2005	Best Singer-Songwriter Album	Resucitar (as producer)	Gian Marco	Won	
2005	Best Contemporary Tropical Album	El Rock de Mi Pueblo (as producer)	Carlos Vives	Won	
2005	Producer of the Year	Sebastian Krys		Nominated	
2007	Producer of the Year	Sebastian Krys		Won	
2007	Best Rock Album by a Duo or Group with Vocal	Kamikaze (as producer)	Los Rabanes	Won	
2009	Record of the Year	"Aquí Estoy Yo" (as producer)	Luis Fonsi featuring David Bisbal, Noel Schajris and Aleks Syntek	Nominated	
2010	Best Engineered Album	Distinto (as engineer)	Diego Torres	Won	
2011	Album of the Year	En Primera Fila (as engineer)	Franco De Vita	Nominated	
2011	Best Male Pop Vocal Album	En Primera Fila (as engineer)	Franco De Vita	Won	
2011	Record of the Year	"Tan Sólo Tú" (as engineer)	Franco De Vita featuring Alejandra Guzmán	Nominated	
2011	Record of the Year	"Gritar" (as engineer)	Luis Fonsi	Nominated	
2012	Record of the Year	"No Me Compares" (as mixer)	Alejandro Sanz	Nominated	
2013	Album of the Year	La Música No Se Toca (as mixer)	Alejandro Sanz	Nominated	
2013	Best Contemporary Pop Vocal Album	La Música No Se Toca (as mixer)	Alejandro Sanz	Won	
2013	Record of the Year	"Mi Marciana" (as mixer)	Alejandro Sanz	Nominated	
2015	Album of the Year	Sirope (as producer)	Alejandro Sanz	Nominated	
2015	Best Contemporary Pop Vocal Album	Sirope (as producer)	Alejandro Sanz	Won	
2015	Record of the Year	"Un Zombie a la Intemperie" (as mixer)	Alejandro Sanz	Nominated	
2015	Producer of the Year	Sebastian Krys		Won	
2021	Album of the Year	Origen (as producer)	Juanes	Nominated	
2021	Best Pop/Rock Album	Origen (as producer)	Juanes	Won	
2023	Album of the Year	Vida Cotidiana (as producer, engineer and mixer)	Juanes	Nominated	
