= Esclavo de Sus Besos =

Single by David Bisbal

from the album Sin Mirar Atrás
- Released: 24 August 2009
- Recorded: 2009
- Genre: Latin pop, soft rock
- Length: 3:57
- Label: Universal
- Songwriters: José Abraham, Juana Lugo
- Producer: Armando Avila

David Bisbal singles chronology
| "Aquí Estoy Yo" (2008) | "Esclavo de Sus Besos" (2009) | "Mi Princesa" (2010) |

"Esclavo de Sus Besos" (English: Slave of Her Kisses) is a song performed by Spanish singer David Bisbal. It was written by José Abraham and Juanma Leal. The song was released as the lead single from Bisbal's fourth studio album Sin Mirar Atrás in August 2009.

The song debuted on the Spanish Singles Chart in the week of 30 August 2009 at number six, being the highest debut for the week. Three weeks later the track peaked at number one for four consecutive weeks. In United States the song debuted on the charts in the week of September 26, 2009 climbing to the top ten of the Billboard Top Latin Songs chart four weeks later. "Esclavo de Sus Besos" peaked at number one on 31 October 2009 replacing "Loba" by Colombian singer-songwriter Shakira, being succeeded by fellow Spanish performer Alejandro Sanz three weeks later. The song became Bisbal's third number-one hit in the chart, following "¿Quién Me Iba a Decir?" (2006) and "Aquí Estoy Yo", his collaboration with Luis Fonsi, Aleks Syntek and Noel Schajris. The official remix features reggaeton romantic duo Magnate & Valentino, or an urban remix.

== Weekly charts ==
| Chart (2009) | Peak position |
|---|---|
| Mexico (Monitor Latino) | 1 |
| Spanish Singles Charts | 1 |
| U.S. Billboard Top Latin Songs | 1 |
| U.S. Billboard Latin Pop Airplay | 1 |
| U.S. Billboard Tropical/Salsa Airplay | 2 |
| U.S. Bubbling Under Hot 100 Singles | 21 |

== Certifications ==
| Region | Certification | Certified units/sales |
|---|---|---|
| Spain (Promusicae) | Gold | 20,000^{*} |
| Spain (Promusicae) Remix version | 2× Platinum | 80,000^{*} |
| United States (RIAA) | Platinum (Latin) | 60,000^{‡} |
^{*} Sales figures based on certification alone.^{‡} Sales+streaming figures based on certification alone.

== See also ==
- List of number-one songs of 2009 (Mexico)
- List of Billboard Latin Rhythm Airplay number ones of 2009
