= Diez Mil Maneras =

Single by David Bisbal

from the album Tú y Yo
- Released: January 23, 2014
- Genre: Latin pop
- Length: 3:33
- Label: Universal Music
- Songwriters: Christopher Nissen, Justin Gray, Johan Wetterberg and Ximena Muñoz
- Producer: Sebastian Krys

David Bisbal singles chronology
"Para Enamorarte de Mí" (2013)	"Diez Mil Maneras" (2014)	"Tu y Yo" (2014)

"Diez Mil Maneras" (English: 10,000 Ways) is a song performed by Spanish singer David Bisbal, released as the second single from his fifth studio album Tú y Yo, on January 23, 2014. The song was written by Christopher Nissen, Justin Gray, Johan Wetterberg and Ximena Muñoz, and produced by Sebastian Krys.

== Charts ==
=== Weekly charts ===
Chart (2014)	Peak position
Dominican Republic Pop Chart (Monitor Latino)	11
Mexico (Billboard Mexican Airplay)	10
Mexico (Monitor Latino)	5
Spain (PROMUSICAE)	1
US Hot Latin Songs (Billboard)	40
US Latin Airplay (Billboard)	36
US Latin Pop Airplay (Billboard)	16

=== Year-end charts ===
Chart (2014)	Position
Spain (PROMUSICAE)	3

== Certifications ==
Region	Certification	Certified units/sales
Mexico (AMPROFON)	2× Platinum	120,000^{‡}
Spain (Promusicae)	2× Platinum	200,000^{‡}
United States (RIAA)	Platinum (Latin)	60,000^{‡}
Streaming
Spain (Promusicae)	Platinum	8,000,000^{†}
^{‡} Sales+streaming figures based on certification alone.^{†} Streaming-only figures based on certification alone.
