= Jij bent zo =

Single by Jeroen van der Boom

from the album Ik ben zo
- Released: 22 June 2007
- Genre: Pop rock
- Length: 3:34
- Label: Red Bullet
- Songwriter: Tony Neef

Jeroen van der Boom singles chronology
"She's a Lady" (2007)	"Jij bent zo" (2007)

Music video
- "Jij bent zo" (Official) on YouTube

"Jij bent zo" is a single by Dutch singer Jeroen van der Boom, released in 2007. It is a Dutch-language cover of the song "Silencio" by Spanish singer David Bisbal.

Both songs are identical, but their lyrics are vastly different. "Silencio" tells the story of someone who feels hurt because his lover left him, and "Jij bent zo" ("That's the way you are") is about someone who overcame his differences with his lover and respects her the way she is. In both versions, every line in the chorus ends with an O.

In August 2007, the song climbed to the top of the Dutch music charts. "Jij bent zo" is Van der Boom's debut in the Dutch Top 40, and at the same time his first number one hit. The music video of "Jij Bent Zo" has been filmed and edit by Cees Quakkelaar a Dutch cameraman.

== Charts ==
=== Weekly charts ===
Weekly chart performance for "Jij bent zo"
Chart (2007)	Peak position
Belgium (Ultratop 50 Flanders)	1
Netherlands (Dutch Top 40)	1
Netherlands (Single Top 100)	1

=== Year-end charts ===
2007 year-end chart performance for "Jij bent zo"
Chart (2007)	Position
Belgium (Ultratop 50 Flanders)	27
Netherlands (Dutch Top 40)	1
Netherlands (Single Top 100)	2

== Certifications ==
Region	Certification	Certified units/sales
Netherlands (NVPI)	Gold	40,000^{^}
^{^} Shipments figures based on certification alone.
