= Sin Mirar Atrás (David Bisbal album) =

Studio album by David Bisbal
- Released: October 20, 2009
- Recorded: 2008–2009 (Madrid, Miami, Los Angeles, Mexico, Bratislava, London, Stockholm, São Paulo)
- Genre: Latin pop · pop rock
- Length: 46:02
- Label: Vale Music · Universal Music Spain · Universal Music Latino
- Producer: Sebastián Krys; José Luis de la Peña; Armando Ávila; Antonio Rayo; Jacobo Calderón; Rafael Vergara; Dimitri Stassos

David Bisbal chronology
Premonición Live (2007)	Sin Mirar Atrás (2009)	Tú y Yo (2014)

Alternative covers
- Amazon alternative cover

Singles from Sin Mirar Atrás
- 1. "Esclavo de Sus Besos" Released: August 24, 2009; 2. "Mi Princesa" Released: November 23, 2009; 3. "Sin Mirar Atrás" Released: May 25, 2010 (Spain only); 4. "24 Horas" Released: May 31, 2010

Sin Mirar Atrás (Without Looking Back) is the fourth studio album recorded by Spanish singer David Bisbal. It was released on October 20, 2009, by Universal Music Spain. It was re-released on July 27, 2010, as Sin Mirar Atrás (24 Horas + Edition).

== Recording and background ==
Sin Mirar Atrás was recorded in studios in Madrid, Miami, Los Angeles, Mexico, Bratislava, London, Stockholm and São Paulo. The album was produced by the Latin Grammy Award-winner Sebastián Krys, José Luis de la Peña, Armando Ávila, Antonio Rayo, Jacobo Calderón, Rafael Vergara and Dimitri Stassos, as well as Bisbal himself, who is credited as co-writer on six songs. It includes collaborations from the English singer-songwriter Pixie Lott and the Mexican singer-songwriter Espinoza Paz.

The album was released in three versions: standard (which has only 11 tracks), deluxe (released the same day with three bonus tracks including the duet with Lott) and the 24 horas + edition (which has the tracks from the standard edition and three versions of "24 Horas" featuring Paz).

== Track listing ==
Standard Edition
No.	Title	Writer(s)	Length
1.	"Esclavo de Sus Besos"	José Abraham, Juanma Leal	3:57
2.	"Mi Princesa"	David Bisbal, Amaury Gutiérrez	3:22
3.	"Dame Tu Amor"	Abraham	3:01
4.	"Sin Mirar Atrás"	Claudio Lozano	3:31
5.	"Besos de Tu Boca"	Bisbal, Gutiérrez	3:27
6.	"Si Falta el Aire"	David Santisteban	3:15
7.	"Sueños Rotos"	Bisbal, Yoel Henríquez	3:59
8.	"Al Andalus"	Antonio Rayo, Bisbal, Rafael Vergara	3:58
9.	"Antes o Después"	Rayo, Bisbal, Vergara	3:50
10.	"24 Horas"	Espinoza Paz	3:40
11.	"Juro Que Te Amo"	Armando Ávila, Jorge Eduardo Murguía P., Mauricio Hernández López de A.	3:47

24 Horas + Edition - Bonus Tracks
No.	Title	Writer(s)	Length
12.	"24 Horas" (featuring Espinoza Paz)	Paz	3:42
13.	"24 Horas" (Ballad version) (featuring Espinoza Paz))	Paz	3:32
14.	"24 Horas" (Banda version) (featuring Espinoza Paz))	Paz	3:30

Deluxe Edition
No.	Title	Writer(s)	Length
1.	"Esclavo de Sus Besos"	Abraham, Leal	3:57
2.	"Mi Princesa"	Bisbal, Gutiérrez	3:22
3.	"Dame Tu Amor"	Abraham	3:01
4.	"Sin Mirar Atrás"	Lozano	3:31
5.	"Besos de Tu Boca"	Bisbal, Gutiérrez	3:27
6.	"Si Falta el Aire"	Santisteban	3:15
7.	"Sueños Rotos"	Bisbal, Henríquez	3:59
8.	"Al Andalus"	Rayo, Bisbal, Vergara	3:58
9.	"Antes o Después"	Rayo, Bisbal, Vergara	3:50
10.	"24 Horas"	Paz	3:40
11.	"Cuando Hacemos el Amor"	Bisbal, David Palau	4:56
12.	"El Ruido"	Vega	3:58
13.	"Sufrirás" (featuring Pixie Lott)	Dimitri Stassos, Linda Sundblad, Måns Zelmerlöw, Versión Español - Cris Zalles	3:26
14.	"Juro Que Te Amo"	Ávila, Murguía P., Hernández López de A.	3:47

US Deluxe Edition - Bonus DVD
No.	Title	Length
15.	"Esclavo de Sus Besos" (Music video)	3:42
16.	"Sufrirás" (Making of (with Pixie Lott))	3:01

Spanish Deluxe Edition - Bonus DVD
No.	Title	Length
15.	"Esclavo de Sus Besos" (Music video)	3:44
16.	"Esclavo de Sus Besos" (Making of)	3:06
17.	"Mi Princesa" (Music video)	3:22
18.	"Mi Princesa" (Making of)	3:21
19.	"Photo Gallery"	2:37
20.	"Interview with David Bisbal"	8:16
21.	"Sin Mirar Atrás" (Making of)	8:12
22.	"Sufrirás" (Making of) (with Pixie Lott)	3:03
23.	"Buen Camino" (Documentary)	27:36

== Charts ==
=== Chart positions ===
Chart (2009)	Peak position
Mexican Albums Chart	17
Dutch Albums Chart	81
Spanish Albums Chart	1
Swiss Music Charts	81
US Top Latin Albums	1
US Latin Pop Albums	1
US Billboard 200	119

=== Certifications ===
Region	Certification	Certified units/sales
Argentina (CAPIF)	Gold	20,000^{^}
Mexico (AMPROFON)	Platinum	60,000^{‡}
Spain (PROMUSICAE)	3× Platinum	180,000^{^}
Venezuela	Gold	
^{^} Shipments figures based on certification alone.^{‡} Sales+streaming figures based on certification alone.

== Release history ==
Country	Date
Standard Edition, Deluxe Edition
Worldwide	October 20, 2009
24 Horas + Edition
Worldwide	July 27, 2010
