= Grandes Canciones =

Grandes Canciones is a term in Spanish for a Greatest hits album. It may make reference to:

- Grandes Canciones (Noel Schajris album)
- Grandes Canciones (Rata Blanca album)

== See also ==
- Greatest Hits (disambiguation)
