= Torre De Babel =

Torre De Babel may refer to:

- Torre De Babel (song)
- Torre de Babel (TV series)
