= Sin Mirar Atrás =

Sin Mirar Atrás may refer to:

- Sin Mirar Atrás (David Bisbal album), 2009
- Sin Mirar Atrás (Los Mismos album), 2000
