= Palabras del Silencio =

Studio album by Luis Fonsi
- Released: 26 August 2008
- Recorded: 2007–2008
- Studio: Angel Recording Studios; (London, England, United Kingdom); Arju Studios; Cata Studios; Hit Factory Critiera; The Warehouse Recording; The Tiki Room; Mofongo Studios; Picks and Hammers; (Miami, Florida); Cosmos Studios; Elith Studios; (Mexico City, Mexico); Junk O-M; (São Paulo, Brazil); Estudio de la Radio Nacional Eslovaca; (Bratislava, Slovakia); Olivetta Recording Studios; (Bolongna, Italy); PKO Studios; (Madrid, Spain)
- Genre: Latin pop
- Label: Universal Latino
- Producer: Jacobo Calderón; José Luis de la Peña; Homero Patrón; Luis Fonsi; Claudia Brant; Armando Ávila; Sebastián Kyrs

Luis Fonsi chronology
Éxitos 98:06 (2007)	Palabras del Silencio (2008)	Tierra Firme (2011)

Singles from Palabras del Silencio
- 1. "No Me Doy por Vencido" Released: June 16, 2008; 2. "Aquí Estoy Yo" Released: January 12, 2009; 3. "Llueve Por Dentro" Released: June 29, 2009; 4. "Aunque Estés con Él" Released: January 25, 2010

Professional ratings
Review scores
Source	Rating
AllMusic	4/5 stars

Palabras del Silencio (English: Words from the Silence) is the seventh studio album, and sixth in Spanish recorded by Puerto Rican singer-songwriter Luis Fonsi. The album was released by Universal Music Latino on 26 August 2008 (see 2008 in music). This album received a Grammy Award for Best Latin Pop Album nomination at the 51st Annual Grammy Awards on 8 February 2009, losing to La Vida... Es Un Ratico by Juanes.

An expanded Anniversary Edition, Palabras del Silencio: Un Año Después, was released on 8 September 2009, expanded to a 2-disc CD+DVD set, including on the CD the original 13 tracks plus an additional 5 tracks.

== Commercial performance ==
The album debuted at No. 15 on Billboard 200 Album Charts selling about 30,000 copies in the first week. It was certified Platinum (Latin) for shipping 100,000 units in the United States and Platinum in Spain for shipping 80,000 units.

It was also certified Gold and Platinum in several countries from Latin America and has sold more than 500,000 copies worldwide.

== Awards and nominations ==
=== 2009 Latin Billboard Music Awards ===
Year	Nominated work	Award	Result
2009	"No Me Doy por Vencido"	Hot Latin Song of the Year	Nominated
2009	"No Me Doy por Vencido"	Hot Latin Song of the Year – Male	Nominated
2009	"No Me Doy por Vencido"	Latin Pop Airplay Song of the Year – Male	Nominated
2009	Palabras del Silencio	Latin Pop Album of the Year – Solo	Nominated
2009	Luis Fonsi	Your World Award (Premio Tu Mundo)	Won

=== Premio Lo Nuestro 2009 ===
Year	Nominated work	Award	Result
2009	Luis Fonsi	Male Pop Artist of the Year	Nominated

=== 2009 Grammy Awards ===
Year	Nominated work	Award	Result
2009	Palabras del Silencio	Best Latin Pop Album	Nominated

=== 2009 Premios Juventud ===
Year	Nominee / work	Award	Result
2009	"No Me Doy por Vencido"	La Mas Pegajosa (Most Addictive Song)	Won
2009	"No Me Doy Por Vencido"	Cancion Corta-Venas (Best Ballad)	Won
2009	"No Me Doy Por Vencido"	Mi Ringtone (My Ringtone)	Nominated
2009	"Aquí Estoy Yo"	La Combinacion Perfecta (Best Collaboration); Shared With: Aleks Syntek, David Bisbal and Noel Scharjis	Won
2009	"Aquí Estoy Yo"	Mi Video Favorito (My Favorite Video); Shared With: Aleks Syntek, David Bisbal and Noel Scharjis	Won
2009	"Luis Fonsi"	Voz del Momento (Artist of the Year)	Won
2009	"Luis Fonsi"	Mi Artista Pop (Favorite Pop Artist)	Won
2009	"Luis Fonsi"	Mi Idolo Es (My Idol Is)	Won
2009	"Luis Fonsi"	Torridos Romances (Favorite Love Birds); Shared With: Adamari López	Won
2009	"Luis Fonsi"	El De Mejor Estilo (Best Dressed)	Won
2009	"Luis Fonsi"	Esta Buenisimo! (Hottest Male)	Nominated
2009	Palabras del Silencio	Me Muero Sin Ese CD (Best Album)	Won

== Track listing ==
No.	Title	Length
1.	"¿Quién Le Va a Decir?"	3:48
2.	"Llueve Por Dentro"	3:59
3.	"Otro Día Será (Desencontrándonos)"	3:14
4.	"No Me Doy por Vencido"	3:58
5.	"Aunque Estés con Él"	4:39
6.	"La Mentira"	3:38
7.	"Lágrimas del Mar"	4:16
8.	"Todo Vuelve A Empezar"" (duet with Laura Pausini)	4:13
9.	"Persiguiendo El Paraíso"	3:38
10.	"Todo Lo Que Tengo"	3:30
11.	"Aquí Estoy Yo" (with Aleks Syntek, Noel Schajris, and David Bisbal)	4:11
12.	"Tienes Razón"	4:22
13.	"No Me Doy Por Vencido (Versión Ranchera)"	3:55

== Charts ==
Chart (2008)	Peak position
Mexico Top 100 Albums	10
Spanish Albums Chart	2
U.S. Billboard 200	15
U.S. Billboard Top Latin Albums	1
U.S. Billboard Latin Pop Albums	1
Venezuelan Albums (Recordland)	2

== Sales and certifications ==
Region	Certification	Certified units/sales
Argentina (CAPIF)	Gold	20,000^{^}
Central America (CFC)	Gold	5,000
Chile Digital download	Platinum	
Colombia (ASINCOL)	2× Platinum	20,000
Mexico (AMPROFON)	Gold	40,000^{^}
Spain (Promusicae)	Platinum	80,000^{^}
United States (RIAA)	Platinum (Latin)	250,000
Venezuela (AVINPRO)	4× Platinum	
Summaries
Worldwide	—	500,000
^{^} Shipments figures based on certification alone.

== Palabras del Silencio: Un Año Después ==
Palabras del Silencio: Un Año Después was released 8 September 2009. The album contained live tracks as well previously unreleased remixes of "No Me Doy Por Vencido" and "Aquí Estoy Yo."

=== Track listing ===
Palabras del Silencio: Un Año Después (©2009)
Disc 1 – CD

1. "Quién Le Va A Decir" – 3:48
2. "Llueve Por Dentro" – 3:59
3. "Otro Día Será (Desencontrándonos)" – 3:14
4. "No Me Doy por Vencido" – 3:58
5. "Aunque Estés Con Él" – 4:38
6. "La Mentira" – 3:37
7. "Lágrimas del Mar" – 4:16
8. "Todo Vuelve A Empezar" (duet with Laura Pausini) – 4:13
9. "Persiguiendo El Paraíso" – 3:37
10. "Todo Lo Que Tengo" – 3:30
11. "Aquí Estoy Yo" (feat. Aleks Syntek, Noel Schajris and David Bisbal) – 4:11
12. "Tienes Razón" – 4:22
13. "No Me Doy Por Vencido (Ranchera Version)" – 3:55
14. "Así Debe Ser" – 3:34
15. "No Me Doy Por Vencido" (Urbana Version) (feat. MJ) – 2:56
16. "No Me Doy Por Vencido" (Banda Version) (feat. German Montero) – 3:52
17. "Aquí Estoy Yo" (Solo Version) – 4:07
18. "Llueve Por Dentro" (Live) (2009 Live from San Juan, Puerto Rico) – 4:53

Disc 2 – DVD

1. "Aquí Estoy Yo" (feat. Aleks Syntek, Noel Schajris, and David Bisbal) [Music Video]
2. "No Me Doy Por Vencido" (Live from Coliseo de Puerto Rico, José Miguel Agrelot Coliseum)
3. "Llueve Por Dentro" (Live from Coliseo de Puerto Rico, José Miguel Agrelot Coliseum)
4. "Aquí Estoy Yo" (feat. Aleks Syntek, Noel Schajris, and David Bisbal) [Live from Coliseo de Puerto Rico, José Miguel Agrelot Coliseum]
