= Jeroen van der Boom =

Dutch singer

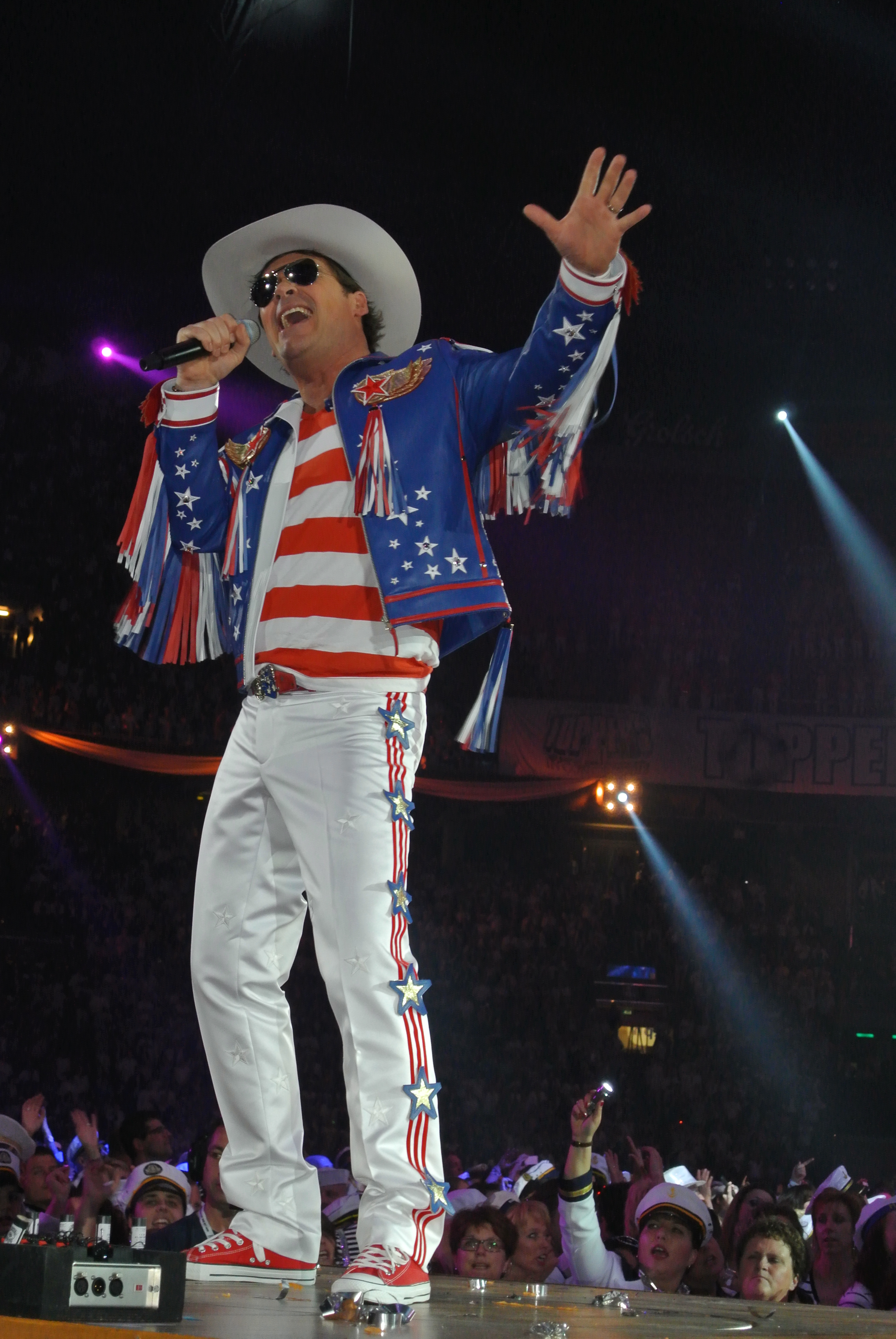
- Jeroen van der Boom in 2009

Background information
- Also known as: Jeroen from the Tree
- Born: 22 June 1972 (age 54); Nijmegen, Netherlands
- Genres: Pop, pop rock
- Occupation: Singer, Keys
- Years active: 1996–present
- Label: Red Bullet
- Website: JeroenvanderBoom.nl

Jeroen van der Boom (born 22 June 1972 in Nijmegen, Netherlands) is a Dutch singer who rose to fame in 2007 with his No. 1 hit single "Jij bent zo".

== Biography ==
During his time as a student, Jeroen van der Boom was already an artist. He played in a relatively unknown band called The Travellers. After he graduated, he started working in the entertainment industry.

== Television ==
In 1996, he was employed by SBS6 as the presenter of the TV programme Real TV, which was later renamed to Explosief. After that, he also worked for the music show 15 Miljoen Mensen, Barney's Dart Show (with Raymond van Barneveld), and Domino Day. In 2002, he founded his own production company: Rebel-TV & Events.

He played in several theatre shows, including Barcelona and Novomundo.

As of 2007, Van der Boom is a voice actor for Café de Wereld, and an entertainer in Koppensnellers.

In 2010, he acted as one of the four judges, for the first season of the TV show The Voice Of Holland.

For the 2011–2012 season of the Voice of Holland, Van Der Boom did not return as a judge. Instead, on 12 March 2011, he became the host of the game show Lotto Weekend Miljonairs, the Dutch version of Who Wants to Be a Millionaire? broadcast on TV.

In 2022, he won that year's season of the Dutch version of the television show The Masked Singer. In 2023, he appeared in an episode of the television game show Alles is Muziek. Van der Boom won the third season of the drag queen show Make Up Your Mind.

== Music ==
Van der Boom regularly gave concerts in the Netherlands, and was eventually given the opportunity to record an album. This album featured cover versions of (amongst others) "Don't Stop Me Now" (by Queen) and "Wonderful Tonight" (by Eric Clapton). In 2007, he recorded a cover of Tom Jones's song "She's a Lady", and was a supporting act during Jones's concert in the Heineken Music Hall on 21 April 2007.

On 18 June 2007, his single "Jij bent zo" (a cover of David Bisbal's "Silencio") was released. It unexpectedly became a huge hit, and rose to the first place on both the Top 40 and the Single Top 100.

On 12 November 2007, a new single was released, "Eén wereld". In December, this song went to the number 1 position in the charts, and remained there for two weeks.

Jeroen represented The Netherlands as a part of the male group De Toppers in the Eurovision Song Contest 2009.

In January 2016, Van der Boom was accused of plagiarizing "Não dá" by the Portuguese band D.A.M.A in his song "Overal waar ik ga" released in June 2015.

== Awards ==
On 12 September 2007 Van der Boom received the "Pluim van de Duim" from Juan da Silva, head of Free Record Shop, for his "positive contribution to the Dutch pop music scene" with "Jij bent zo".

== Discography ==
=== Albums ===
- Jij bent zo (2007)
- Verder (2009)
- Grote liefde (2011)

=== Singles ===
- "Café de Wereldcup" (2006) (as Café de Wereld)
- "Jij bent zo" (2007)
- "Eén wereld" (2007)
- "Betekenis" (2008)
- "Het is over" (2008)
- "Alles min een" (2009)
