= Bulería (song) =

Single by David Bisbal

from the album Bulería
- Released: 2004
- Recorded: 2003
- Genre: Pop, Latin
- Songwriters: Kike Santander, Gustavo Santander

David Bisbal singles chronology
"Dígale" (2003)	"Bulería" (2004)	"Oye El Boom" (2004)

Music video
- "Bulería" on YouTube

"Bulería" is the David Bisbal's fourth official single and the lead single off his second studio album Bulería. The single was released in Spain early 2004. The singer performed the song with Camila Cabello on Cabello's Never Be the Same Tour Live in Madrid.

== Formats and track listings ==
- CD single
1. "Bulería"
- CD single – France
1. "Bulería" (Radio Edit)
2. "Bulería" (Remix - Radio Edit)
- CD single – Canada
1. "Bulería" (Original Version)
2. "Bulería" (Remix)
3. "Bulería" (Without Flamenco Guitar Intro. Version)
4. "Bulería" (Without Bulería Vocals Version)
- Digital download – live version
1. "Bulería (Live)" – 4:10

== Credits and personnel ==
Publishing

- Phonographic Copyright (p) – Vale Music Spain S.L.
- Copyright (c) – Vale Music Spain S.L.
- Record company – Vale Music Spain S.L.
- Produced for – Santander Productions
- Mastered at – Metropolis Mastering
- Published by – Kike Santander Music, LLC
- Published by – Santander Melodies, LLC
- Published by – Famous Music Corporation

Personnel

- David Bisbal – vocals
- Gustavo Santander – songwriting
- Kike Santander – songwriting, production, arrangement, strings arrangement, wind Arrangement
- Daniel Betancourt – production, arrangement, strings arrangement, keyboards programming
- Milton Salcedo – strings arrangement
- Camilo Valencia – wind Arrangement
- Jose Gaviria – backing vocals,
- Rafa Vergara – backing vocals, coros flamencos backing vocals
- Robin Espejo – backing vocals
- Vicky Echeverry – backing vocals
- Paco Fonta – coros flamencos backing vocals, handclaps
- Virginia Moreno – coros flamencos backing vocals, handclaps
- Konstantin Litvinenko – Cello
- Francesc Freixes – graphic design
- Kike Santander – direction
- Rayito – flamenco guitar, handclaps
- Academia de Artistas – management
- Tony Cousins – mastering
- Richard Bravo – percussion
- Rubendarío – photography
- Victor Moscardó – photography
- Milton Salcedo – piano
- Ed Calle – tenor saxophone, baritone saxophone
- Dana Teboe – trombone
- Jason Carder – trumpet
- Luis Aquino – trumpet
- Pedro Alfonso – violin, viola

== Charts ==
Chart (2004)	Peak position
Argentina (Monitor Latino)	1
Spain (Promusicae)	1
US Hot Latin Songs (Billboard)	11
World Latin Top Singles	2

== Certifications ==
Region	Certification	Certified units/sales
Mexico (AMPROFON)	Gold	30,000^{‡}
United States (RIAA)	Platinum (Latin)	60,000^{‡}
^{‡} Sales+streaming figures based on certification alone.

== See also ==
- List of number-one singles of 2004 (Spain)
