= Latin Grammy Award records =

Throughout the thirteen-year history of the Latin Grammy Awards, multiple records have been set. This page includes competitive awards only and does not include special awards such as Lifetime Achievement awards or any other non-competitive awards presented by the Latin Academy of Recording Arts & Sciences.

== Awards ==
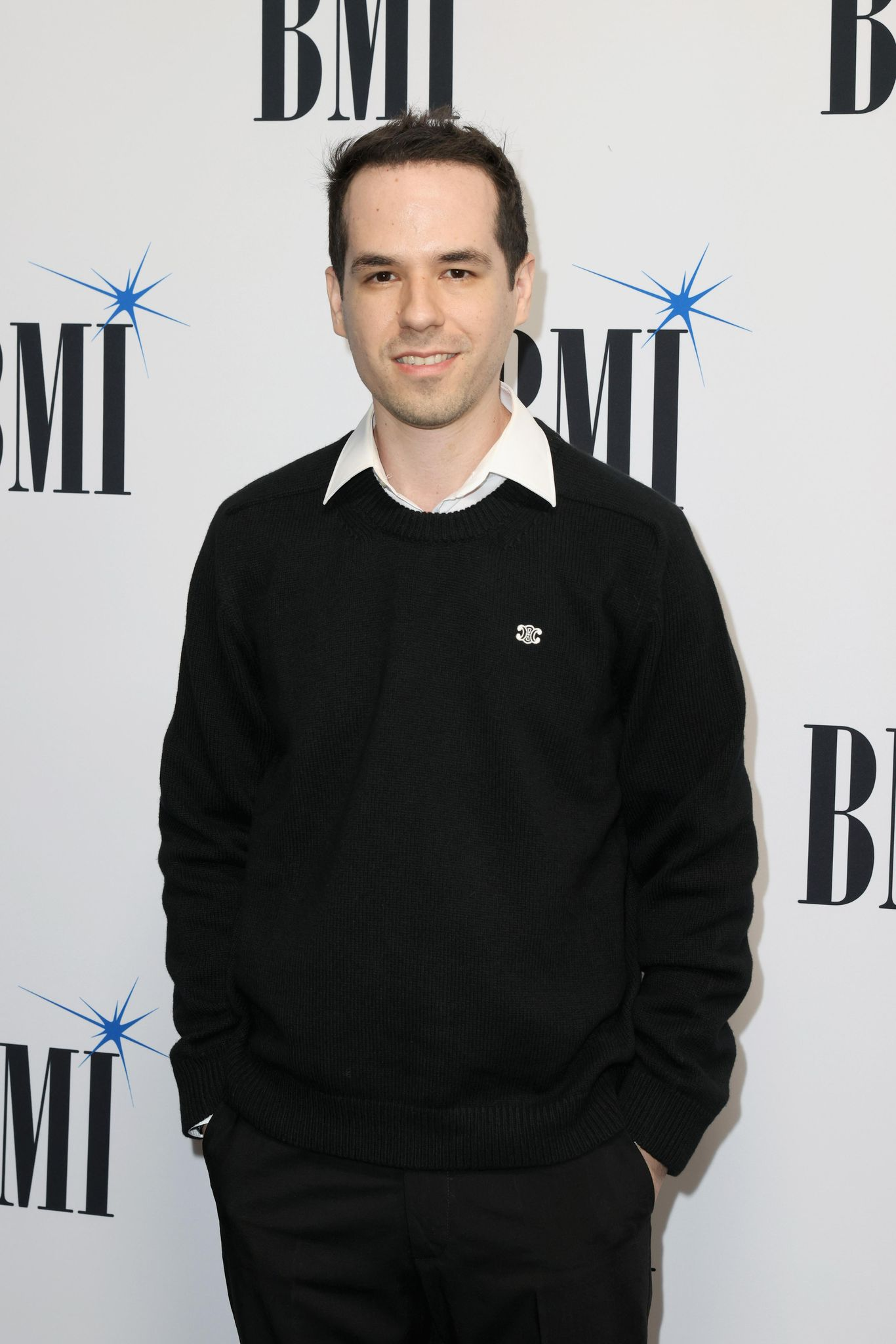
Edgar Barrera is the most awarded person, with 31 accolades.

=== Most Latin Grammys won ===
| Rank | Artist | Number of awards | Ref. |
|---|---|---|---|
| 1 | Edgar Barrera | 31 | |
| 2 | Residente (Note: Residente's awards include 22 as part of Calle 13.) | 29 | |
| 3 | Juan Luis Guerra | 28 | |
| 4 | Juanes | 27 | |
| 5 | Cabra (Note: Cabra's awards include 22 as part of Calle 13.) | 24 | |
| 5 | Alejandro Sanz | 24 | |
| 6 | Calle 13 | 22 | |
| 7 | Allan Leschhorn | 21 | |
| 7 | Rafael Arcaute | 21 | |
| 8 | Natalia Lafourcade | 20 | |
| 9 | Carlos Vives | 19 | |
| 10 | Bad Bunny | 17 | |
| 10 | Gustavo Santaolalla | 17 | |
| 11 | Carlos Alvarez | 16 | |
| 11 | Sergio George | 16 | |
| 11 | Rosalía | 16 | |
| 11 | Jorge Drexler | 16 | |

=== Most Latin Grammys won by a male artist ===
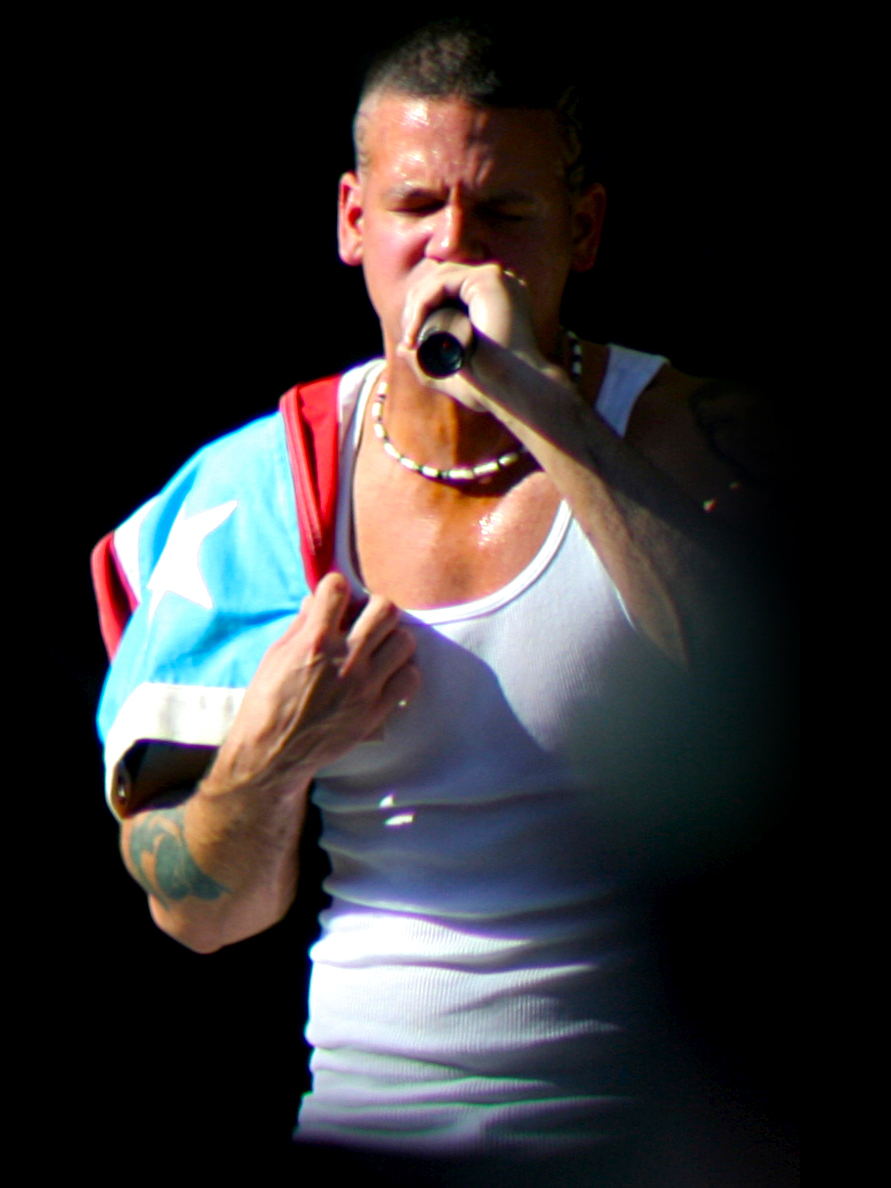
Residente is the most awarded male artist, with 29 accolades.

| Rank | Artist | Number of awards |
|---|---|---|
| 1 | Residente | 29 |
| 2 | Juan Luis Guerra | 28 |
| 3 | Juanes | 25 |
| 4 | Cabra | 24 |
| 4 | Alejandro Sanz | 24 |
| 5 | Allan Leschhorn | 21 |
| 5 | Rafael Arcaute | 21 |
| 6 | Carlos Vives | 19 |
| 7 | Bad Bunny | 17 |
| 7 | Gustavo Santaolalla | 17 |
| 8 | Carlos Alvarez | 16 |
| 8 | Sergio George | 16 |
| 8 | Jorge Drexler | 16 |

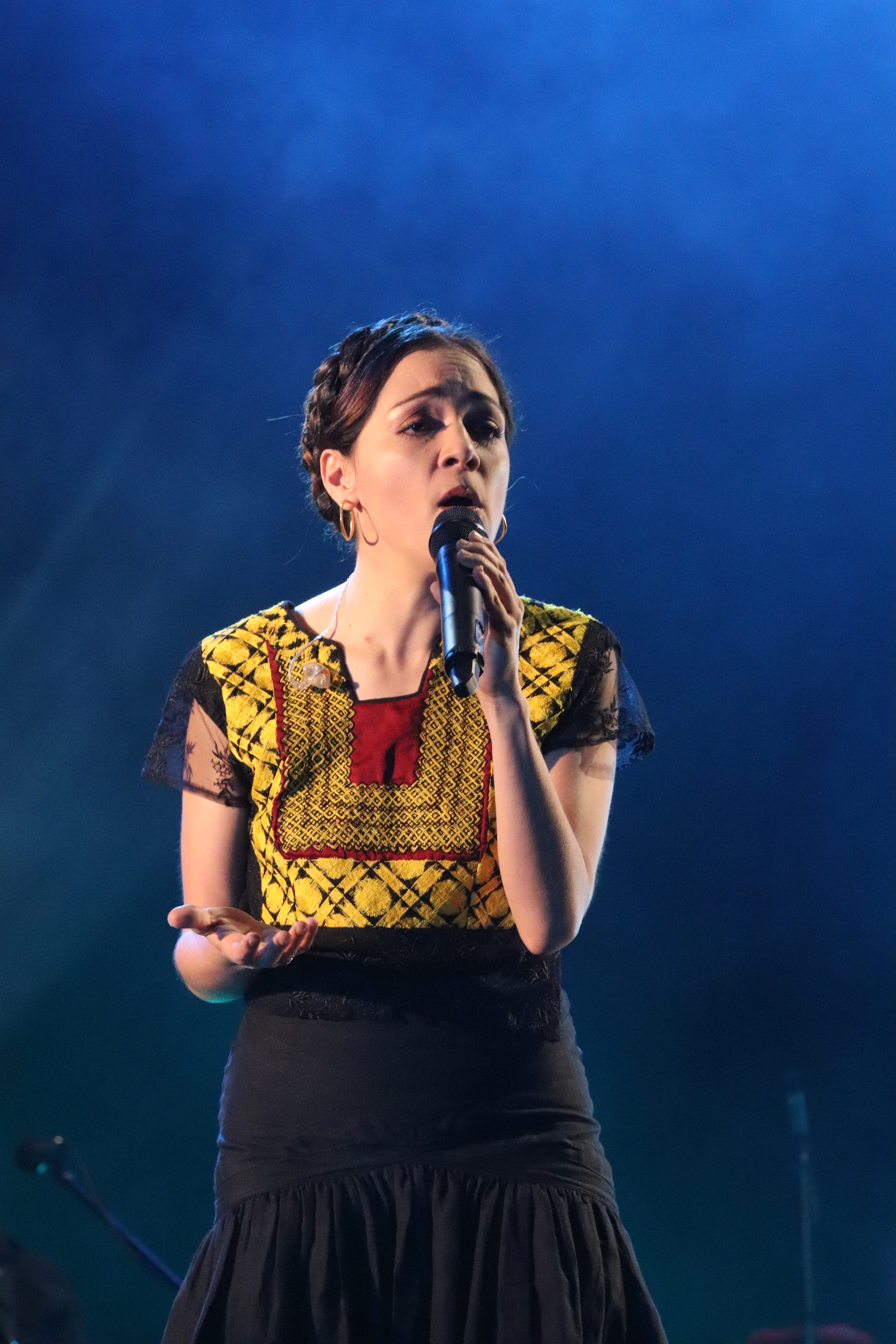
Natalia Lafourcade is the most awarded female artist, with 20 accolades.

=== Most Latin Grammys won by a female artist ===
| Rank | Artist | Number of awards | Ref. |
|---|---|---|---|
| 1 | Natalia Lafourcade | 20 | |
| 2 | Rosalía | 16 | |
| 3 | Shakira | 15 | |
| 4 | Karol G | 10 | |
| 5 | Aline Barros | 8 | |
| 5 | Julieta Venegas | 8 | |
| 5 | Maria Rita | 8 | |
| 6 | Kany García | 7 | |

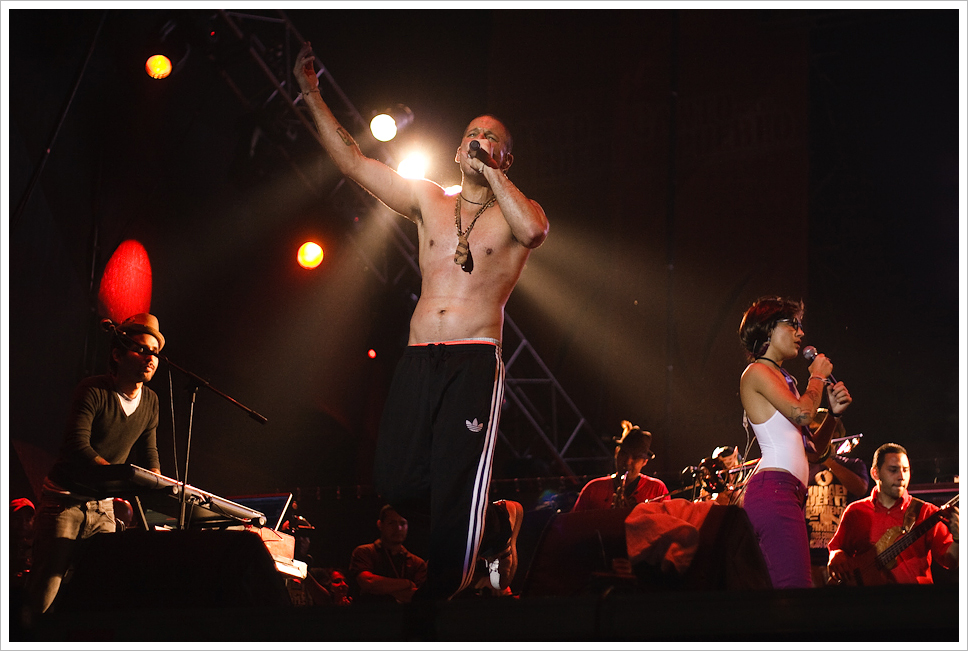
Calle 13 is the most awarded Group, with 22 accolades.

=== Most Latin Grammys won by a group ===
| Rank | Artist | Number of awards | Ref. |
|---|---|---|---|
| 1 | Calle 13 | 22 | |
| 2 | Banda el Recodo | 9 | |
| 3 | Café Tacvba | 8 | |
| 3 | Los Tigres del Norte | 8 | |
| 4 | Motolov | 7 | |
| 5 | Jimmy González y Grupo Mazz | 6 | |

=== Most Latin Grammys won by a duo ===
Ca7riel & Paco Amoroso is the most awarded duo, with 8 accolades.

| Rank | Artist | Number of awards | Ref. |
|---|---|---|---|
| 1 | Ca7riel & Paco Amoroso | 8 | |
| 2 | Chitãozinho & Xororó | 6 | |
| 2 | Jesse & Joy | 6 | |
| 3 | Renato Teixeira | 3 | |

=== Most Latin Grammys won by a producer ===
Edgar Barrera with 31 awards has won more awards than any other producer.

| Rank | Artist | Number of awards |
|---|---|---|
| 1 | Edgar Barrera | 31 |
| 2 | Juan Luis Guerra | 28 |
| 3 | Rafael Arcaute | 21 |
| 4 | Gustavo Santaolalla | 17 |
| 5 | Sergio George | 16 |

=== Most Latin Grammys won by an engineer or mixer ===
Thom Russo with 11 awards, has won more than any other engineer or mixer.

| Rank | 1st | 2nd | 3rd | 4th | 5th |
|---|---|---|---|---|---|
| Engineer or Mixer | Sebastian Krys; Thom Russo | Rafael Arcaute; Aníbal Kerpel; Javier Garza; Rafa Sardina | Carlos Alvarez; Mike Couzzi | Emilio Estefan; Benny Faccone | Ronnie Torres |
| Total | 11 | 10 | 9 | 8 | 7 |

=== Youngest Winner ===
Jaden, from the group Sophia, made history as the youngest Latin Grammy winner when he received the award for Best Latin Children's Album in 2022 at just 8 years old. Meanwhile, Mexican singer Yuri became the youngest artist to receive the Latin Grammy Lifetime Achievement Award, which she was honored in 2018 with at the age of 54.

=== Oldest Winner ===
Cuban born American musician Angela Alvarez was awarded Best New Artist at age 95 in 2022.

=== Most Honored Albums ===
Entren Los Que Quieran by Calle 13 is the most honored album in Latin Grammy history. It won nine awards in 2011.

| Rank | 1st | 2nd | 3rd |
|---|---|---|---|
| Album | Entren Los Que Quieran by Calle 13 | La Llave de Mi Corazón by Juan Luis Guerra; Un Día Normal by Juanes; El Mal Querer and Lux by Rosalía | Debí Tirar Más Fotos by Bad Bunny Papota by Ca7riel & Paco Amoroso |
| Total | 9 | 6 | 5 |

=== Most Record of the Year wins ===
The Record of the Year award is given to the performers, producers, recording engineers, mixing engineers and mastering engineers for commercially released singles or tracks of new vocal or instrumental recordings in Spanish or Portuguese language. Due to the increasing musical changes in the industry, from 2012 the category includes 10 nominees. Alejandro Sanz has won the most awards in the category with five wins out of nine nominations.

Performers
| Awards | Artist | Ref. |
|---|---|---|
| 8 | Alejandro Sanz | |
| 3 | Jorge Drexler | |
| 2 | Juanes | |
| 2 | Shakira | |
| 2 | Calle 13 | |
| 2 | Natalia Lafourcade | |
| 2 | Juan Luis Guerra | |

Producers/engineers
| Awards | Producer/engineer | Ref. |
|---|---|---|
| 2 | Benny Faccone (Note: As recording and mixing engineer.) | |
| 2 | Gustavo Santaolalla (Note: As producer.) | |
| 2 | Anibal Kerpel | |
| 2 | Thom Russo | |
| 2 | Lulo Pérez | |
| 2 | Rafael Arcaute (Note: As producer and recording engineer.) | |

=== Most Album of the Year wins ===
The Album of the Year award is given to the performers, producers, recording engineers, mixing engineers and mastering engineers for vocal or instrumental albums with 51% of newly recorded material. Due to the increasing musical changes in the industry, from 2012 the category includes 10 nominees. Beginning in 2018, songwriters are eligible for the accolade if 33% of the playing time are written by them. Juan Luis Guerra is the performer with the most wins in the category with four awards, including one as a producer, while Allan Leschhorn has also received four awards as recording and mixing engineer.

Performers
| Awards | Artist | Ref |
|---|---|---|
| 5 | Juan Luis Guerra | |
| 3 | Alejandro Sanz | |
| 3 | Juanes | |
| 3 | Rosalia | |
| 2 | Luis Miguel | |
| 2 | Calle 13 | |

Producers/Engineers
| Awards | Producer/Engineer | Ref |
|---|---|---|
| 4 | Allan Leschhorn | |
| 3 | Ronnie Torres | |
| 3 | Adam Ayan | |

=== Most Song of the Year wins ===
The Song of the Year award is given to the songwriters of new songs containing at least 51% of lyrics in Spanish or Portuguese language. Instrumental songs and cover versions are not eligible. Due to the increasing musical changes in the industry, from 2012 the category includes 10 nominees. Alejandro Sanz is the most awarded songwriter in the category with four wins out of eight nominations.

| Awards | Artist | Ref. |
|---|---|---|
| 4 | Alejandro Sanz | |
| 3 | Shakira | |
| 3 | Jorge Drexler | |
| 2 | Juanes | |
| 2 | Carlos Vives | |
| 2 | Andrés Castro | |
| 2 | Luis Fonsi | |

=== Artists who have won all four General Field awards ===
There have been only two musicians who have won all four General Field awards: Album of the Year, Record of the Year, Song of the Year, and Best New Artist.

In 2001, Juanes won Best New Artist. He earned the three other awards in 2003 and 2008. He's the first artist to win all four awards in the General Field.

In 2006, Calle 13 won Best New Artist. In 2009 the band won Album of the Year and Record of the Year and in 2013 the group won all three major awards in that night making them the second overall artists and the first band to achieve this milestone.

== Single Ceremony ==
=== Most Latin Grammys won in one night ===
Calle 13 holds the record for most Latin Grammys won in one night with nine wins in 2011.

| Rank | Artist | Awards |
|---|---|---|
| 1 | Calle 13 (2011) | 9 |
| 2 | Jorge Drexler (2022) | 6 |
| 3 | Juanes (2003, 2008) | 5 |
| 3 | Juan Luis Guerra (2007) | 5 |
| 3 | Bad Bunny (2025) | 5 |
| 3 | Ca7riel & Paco Amoroso (2025) | 5 |
| 3 | Rosalía (2026) | 5 |

=== Most Latin Grammys won by a male artist is one night ===
Jorge Drexler holds the record for most Latin Grammys won in one night by a male artist with six wins in 2022. Juanes, Juan Luis Guerra, Bad Bunny and Ca7riel & Paco Amoroso follow him with five.

| Rank | Artist(s) | Awards |
|---|---|---|
| 1 | Jorge Drexler (2022) | 6 |
| 2 | Juanes (2003, 2008) | 5 |
| 2 | Juan Luis Guerra (2007) | 5 |
| 2 | Bad Bunny (2025) | 5 |
| 2 | Ca7riel & Paco Amoroso (2025) | 5 |

=== Most Latin Grammys won by a female artist in one night ===
Rosalía hold the record for most Latin Grammys won in one night by a female artist which is five.

| Rank | Artist(s) | Awards |
|---|---|---|
| 1 | Rosalía (2026) | 5 |
| 2 | Shakira (2006) | 4 |
| 2 | Natalia Lafourcade (2015) | 4 |
| 3 | Rosalía (2019, 2020) | 3 |
| 3 | Natalia Lafourcade (2020, 2023) | 3 |
| 3 | Shakira (2023) | 3 |
| 3 | Karol G (2023) | 3 |

=== Most Latin Grammys won by a group in one night ===
Calle 13 with nine wins in 2011, holds the record for most wins by a group in one night.

=== Most Latin Grammys awarded to an album on one night ===
In 2011 Calle 13's Entren Los Que Quieran won nine awards. It won Record of the Year, Album of the Year, Song of the Year, Best Urban Album, Best Urban Song, Best Alternative Song, Best Tropical Song, Producer of the Year and Best Short Form Music Video.

| Rank | 1st | 2nd | 3rd |
|---|---|---|---|
| Album | Entren Los Que Quieran by Calle 13 | La Llave de Mi Corazón by Juan Luis Guerra, Un Día Normal by Juanes and Lux (Rosalía album) by Rosalía | Debí Tirar Más Fotos by Bad Bunny and Papota by Ca7riel & Paco Amoroso |
| Awards | 9 | 6 | 5 |

== Nominations ==
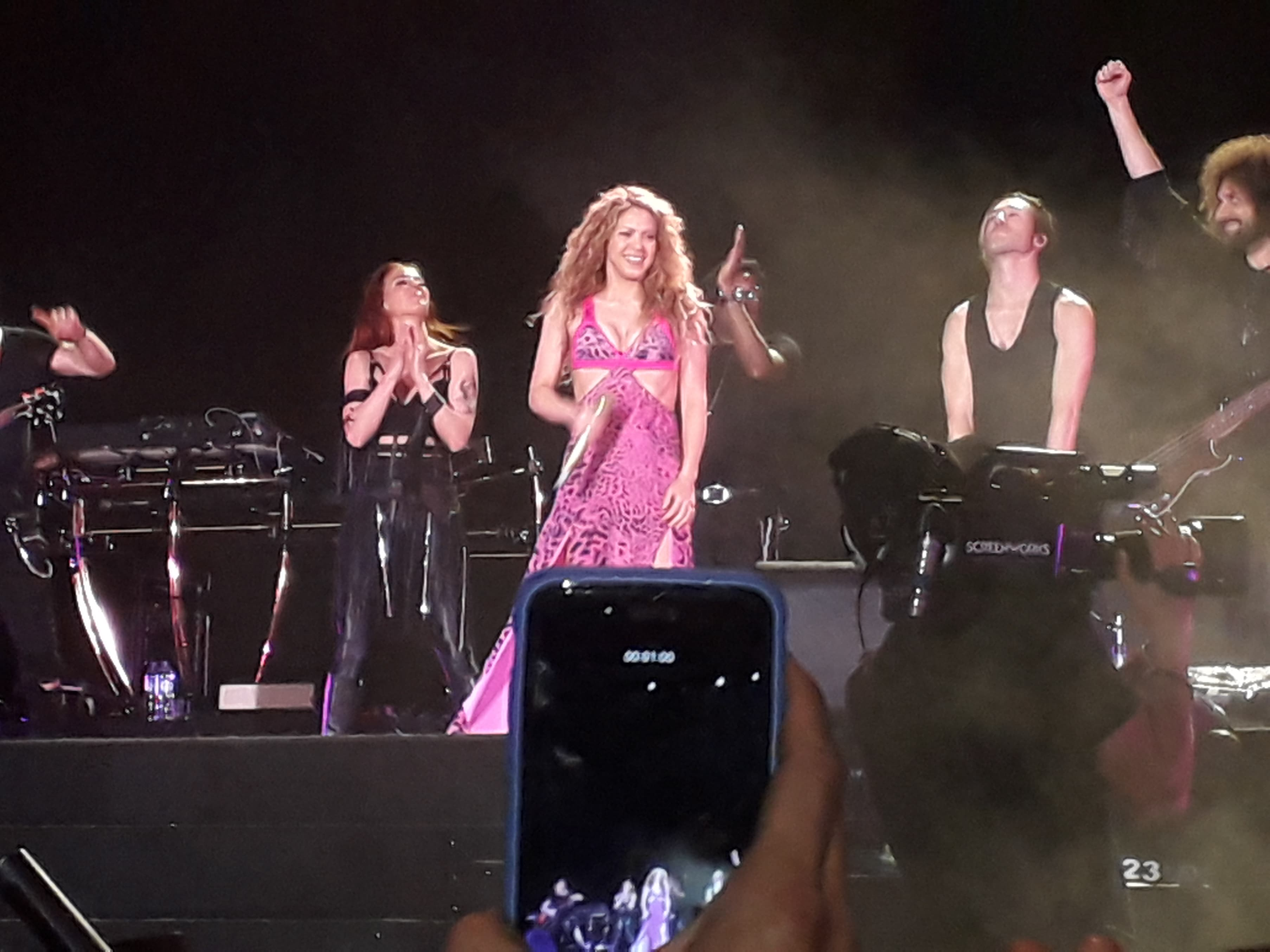
In 2023, Shakira became the first artist in history to receive three nomination in Song of the Year category in the same year with Shakira: Bzrp Music Sessions, Vol. 53, TQG, and Acróstico.

=== Most Latin Grammy nominations ===
Edgar Barrera holds the record for the most Latin Grammy nominations with 74.

| Nominations | Artist | Ref. |
|---|---|---|
| 74 | Edgar Barrera | |
| 55 | Residente (Note: Residente's nominations include 33 as part of Calle 13.) | |
| 52 | Bad Bunny | |
| 51 | Alejandro Sanz | |
| 49 | Juanes | |
| 42 | Natalia Lafourcade | |
| 40 | Eduardo Cabra (Note: Eduardo Cabra's nominations include 33 as part of Calle 13.) | |
| 36 | Shakira | |

| Rank | 1st | 2nd | 3rd | 4th | 5th | 6th | 7th | 8th | 9th | 10th | 10th | 11th |
|---|---|---|---|---|---|---|---|---|---|---|---|---|
| Artist | René Pérez Joglar "Residente" | Calle 13 | Shakira | Juanes | | Eduardo Cabra "Visitante" | Alejandro Sanz | Juan Luis Guerra Daddy Yankee; Rosalía | Carlos Vives | Gustavo Santaolalla | Karol G | Caetano Veloso |
| Total | 42 | 40 | 36 | 35 | 34 | 33 | 32 | 31 | 30 | 29 | 28 | 27 |

=== Most Nominations in one night ===
J Balvin was nominated for thirteen Latin Grammy Awards in 2020. Calle 13 was nominated for ten Latin Grammy Awards in 2011. Eduardo Cabra was nominated for ten Latin Grammy Awards in 2014.

=== Most Nominations for a Female artist in one night ===
Rosalía and Karol G hold the record for most Nominations in one night for a female artist with eight. Rosalía was nominated for eight awards in 2022 (Note: Overall Rosalía received nine nominations at the 23rd Annual Latin Grammy Awards, since her Motomami was also nominated for Best Engineered Album, but that nomination goes to Chris Gehringer, Jeremie Inhaber, Manny Marroquin, Zach Peraya & Anthony Vilchis.) and Karol G was nominated for eight awards in 2024.

== See also ==
- Grammy Award records
