= Corazón latino =

Corazón Latino

Studio album by David Bisbal
- Released: October 15, 2002
- Recorded: March – April 2002
- Studio: Estudio G; Estudios Aurha (Barcelona, Spain); JMV Studios; South Beach Audio; MT Studio (New York, New York); Critiera Moon Studios; One-Take Studios; The Hit Factory; The Gallery Recording Studios; Santander Studios (Miami, Florida)
- Genre: Latin pop • Latin ballad
- Length: 42:15
- Label: Vale Music · Universal Music Spain · Universal Music Latino
- Producer: José Gaviria; Bernardo Ossa; Kike Santander; José Miguel Velásquez; Fernando Tobón; Daniel Betancourt; Andrés Múnera

David Bisbal chronology
Corazón Latino (2002)	Bulería (2004)

Singles from Corazón Latino
- 1. "Ave María" Released: May 13, 2002; 2. "Corazón Latino" Released: July 1, 2002; 3. "Lloraré Las Penas" Released: July 22, 2002; 4. "Dígale" Released: November 11, 2002; 5. "Quiero Perderme en Tu Cuerpo" Released: January 6, 2003; 6. "Como Será" Released: March 31, 2003

Corazón Latino (Latin Heart) is the debut studio album recorded by Spanish singer David Bisbal. It was released by Vale Music, Universal Music Spain and Universal Music Latino on October 15, 2002 (see 2002 in music). The album received international attention and sold 1.3 million copies in Spain. The second track, "Digale", is featured on Televisa's hit soap-opera Cuidado con el ángel (2008–2009).

== Track listing ==
No.	Title	Writer(s)	Length
1.	"Ave María"	K. Santander · G. Santander	3:31
2.	"Dígale"	C. Leuzzi · G. Santander	4:24
3.	"Un Amor Que Viene y Va"	Daniel Betancourt · K. Santaner · G. Santaner	3:44
4.	"Fuiste Mía"	J. Gaviria · X. Muñóz · B. Ossa	3:45
5.	"Lloraré las Penas"	Rayito · José M. Velásquez	4:00
6.	"Quiero Perderme en Tu Cuerpo"	K. Santander	3:59
7.	"Como Será"	K. Santander · G. Santander	3:58
8.	"Vuelvo a Tí" (with Chenoa)	J. Gaviria · K. Santander	3:41
9.	"Por Tí"	K. Santander · G. Santander	4:08
10.	"Por Cuanto Tiempo"	K. Santander	3:53
11.	"Corazón Latino"	J. Cubino	2:55
Total length:			42:15

== Charts and certifications ==
=== Charts ===
Chart (2002/2003)	Peak position
Spanish Top 100 Albums	1
US Billboard Top Latin Albums	13
US Billboard Top Heatseekers	41
US Billboard Latin Pop Albums	6

=== Certifications ===
Region	Certification	Certified units/sales
Argentina (CAPIF)	Gold	20,000^{^}
Argentina (CAPIF) Limited Edition	Gold	20,000^{^}
Central America (CFC)	Gold	10,000
Chile	Gold	
Colombia	Gold	
Ecuador	Gold	
Mexico (AMPROFON)	2× Platinum	300,000^{‡}
Spain (Promusicae)	13× Platinum	1,300,000^{^}
United States (RIAA)	Platinum (Latin)	100,000^{^}
Uruguay (CUD)	Gold	
Venezuela	Gold	
Summaries
Europe (IFPI)	Platinum	1,000,000^{*}
Worldwide	—	2,000,000
^{*} Sales figures based on certification alone.^{^} Shipments figures based on certification alone.^{‡} Sales+streaming figures based on certification alone.

== See also ==
- List of best-selling albums in Spain
- List of best-selling Latin albums
