= Premonición Live =

Live album by David Bisbal
- Released: November 25, 2007 (Spain)
- Genre: Latin pop
- Label: Universal Latino

David Bisbal chronology
Premonición (2006)	Premonición Live (2007)	Sin Mirar Atrás (2009)

Premonición Live is a live album of Spanish pop singer David Bisbal released in 2007. This is the second live album of the singer, the first being Todo Por Ustedes.

== Track listing ==
It was released in 3CDs:

CD1 All renditions on CD1 are live

1. Intro Show 2007 / Calentando Voy – 5:12
2. Medley Funk – 5:07
3. Amar Es Lo Que Quiero – 4:32
4. Premonición – 4:18
5. Qué Tendrás – 4:04
6. Oye El Boom – 5:04
7. Cuidar Nuestro Amor (I'll Never Let Go) – 4:03
8. Esta Ausencia – 5:02
9. Lloraré Las Penas – 4:54
10. Ave María – 5:46
11. Amanecer Sin Ti – 4:01

CD2 All renditions on CD1 are live

1. Medley Baladas 1 – 4:56
2. Aquí Y Ahora – 4:38
3. Como La Primera Vez – 4:01
4. Medley Baladas 2 – 4:31
5. Como Olvidar – 5:19
6. Dígale – 9:17
7. Quien Me Iba A Decir – 3:38
8. Silencio – 6:29
9. Soldado De Papel – 7:01
10. Torre De Babel – 3:33
11. Bulería – 5:58

CD3 (Studio recordings)

1. Todo Por Ustedes (versión estudio-demo) – 4:30
2. La Actriz – 3:10
3. Crumbling – 4:10
4. No Juegues Conmigo – 4:39
5. Odio Y Placer (demo) – 3:27
6. Amante Bandido – 4:09
7. Bum Bum Bum – 4:27
8. Cuidar Nuestro Amor (I'll Never Let Go) (demo up-tempo) – 3:36
9. Profundo (Crumbling) – 4:09
10. Caramelito – 3:06
11. Hear The Boom – 4:25
12. The Sun Ain't Gonna Shine Anymore (Sun Rivera Spanglish mix) – 6:33
13. Desnúdate Mujer (JMV Dance remix) – 4:51
14. Hate That I Love You (Spanglish version) – 3:41
