= Silencio (David Bisbal song) =

Single by David Bisbal

from the album Premonición
- Released: 7 December 2006
- Genre: Latin rock, rock
- Length: 3:31
- Songwriter: Kike Santander

David Bisbal singles chronology
"¿Quién Me Iba a Decir?" (2006)	"Silencio" (2006)	"Soldado De Papel" (2006)

"Silencio" (English: Silence) is the second single to be released from David Bisbal's 2006 studio album, Premonición. "Silencio" tells the story of someone who feels hurt because his lover left him.

In October, the single was started Spanish promotion in TV show with the mobile tune.

== Charts ==
=== Weekly charts ===
Chart (2006–07)	Peak position
Austria (Ö3 Austria Top 40)	6
European Hot 100	36
Germany (GfK)	10
Netherlands (Single Top 100)	79
Switzerland (Schweizer Hitparade)	10
US Latin Pop Airplay (Billboard)	32

=== Year-end charts ===
Chart (2007)	Position
Austria (Ö3 Austria Top 40)	43
Germany (Official German Charts)	59
Switzerland (Schweizer Hitparade)	44

== Covers ==
In the summer of 2007, Dutch artist Jeroen van der Boom covered "Silencio" in Dutch, called "Jij bent zo", and hit number 1 with his version in the Dutch top 40.
