= No Me Doy por Vencido =

2008 single by Luis Fonsi

- US iTunes Store cover

Single by Luis Fonsi

from the album Palabras del Silencio
- Released: June 2, 2008
- Recorded: 2008
- Studio: Cosmos Studios; Elith Studios; (Mexico City, Mexico)
- Genre: Latin pop; rock; alternative mariachi; latin ballad
- Length: 3:58
- Label: Universal Music Latino
- Songwriters: Luis Fonsi; Claudia Brant
- Producers: Armando Ávila; Emilio Ávila (exec.)

Luis Fonsi singles chronology
"Tú Amor" (2006)	"No Me Doy por Vencido" (2008)	"Aquí Estoy Yo" (2009)

"No Me Doy por Vencido" (transl. I Don't Give Up) is a Spanish language song performed by Puerto Rican-American singer-songwriter Luis Fonsi. It was released on June 2, 2008, for the promotional and charity compilation, AT&T Team USA Soundtrack (2008) and lead single from seventh studio album Palabras del Silencio (2008). The music video of the song was released on YouTube in August 2008. It is one of Fonsi's biggest hits to date, breaking into the Billboard Hot 100 at number 92.

== Chart performance ==
After making its debut during the summer of 2008, the song became a number one hit on the Hot Latin Tracks chart in September. As of 17 January 2009, the song was at the top for 17 of the latest 19 weeks (only to be interrupted for two weeks in November by Enrique Iglesias' "Lloro Por Ti"). It would not only hold off "Lloro Por Ti" from the top spot, but it would hold off other hits such as "Te Regalo Amores" by R.K.M & Ken-Y, "Dame Tu Amor" by Alacranes Musical, and "Como Duele" by Ricardo Arjona. It was a big success in Spain where it peaked at number four and sold 50,000 copies. "No Me Doy por Vencido" was named the fourth best-performing Latin pop song of the decade ending 31 December 2009. In Latin America, the song enjoyed success, peaking at number one in Mexico, Panama and Venezuela; and reaching the top-ten in Chile, Colombia, Costa Rica and Guatemala.

== Track listing ==
=== CD single ===
1. "No Me Doy por Vencido" (Album Version)
2. "No Me Doy por Vencido" (Ranchera Version)
3. "No Me Doy por Vencido" (featuring MJ) (Mambo Kingz Reggaeton Radio Edit)
4. "No Me Doy por Vencido" (featuring MJ) (Mambo Kingz Reggaeton Full Mix)

=== Remixes ===
1. "No Me Doy por Vencido" (Bachata Version)
2. "No Me Doy por Vencido" (featuring German Montero) (Banda Version)

== Charts ==
=== Weekly charts ===
Chart (2008–09)	Peak Position
Argentina (CAPIF)	4
Chile (EFE)	4
Colombia (EFE)	6
Costa Rica (EFE)	10
Guatemala (EFE)	3
Mexico (Monitor Latino)	1
Panama (EFE)	1
Spain (Promusicae)	4
US Billboard Hot 100	92
US Hot Latin Songs (Billboard)	1
Venezuela (Record Report)	1

=== All-time charts ===
Chart (2021)	Position
US Hot Latin Songs (Billboard)	7

== Certifications ==
Region	Certification	Certified units/sales
Spain (Promusicae)	2× Platinum	50,000^{^}
Spain (Promusicae) Ringtone	Platinum	20,000^{*}
^{*} Sales figures based on certification alone.^{^} Shipments figures based on certification alone.

== 2009 Latin Billboard Music Awards ==
Year	Nominated work	Award	Result
2009	"No Me Doy por Vencido"	Hot Latin Song of the Year	Nominated
2009	"No Me Doy por Vencido"	Hot Latin Song of the Year – Male	Nominated
2009	"No Me Doy por Vencido"	Latin Pop Airplay Song of the Year – Male	Nominated

== See also ==
- List of number-one songs of 2008 (Mexico)
