= Uno No Es Uno =

Studio album by Noel Schajris
- Released: October 13, 2009
- Genre: Latin pop
- Label: Sony Discos

Noel Schajris chronology
Cita En Las Nubes (1999)	Uno No Es Uno (2009)	Grandes Canciones (2011)

Uno No Es Uno is the second album by Argentine singer Noel Schajris released on October 13, 2009.

== Track listing ==
1. Momentos
2. No Veo La Hora
3. A Un Minuto del Sol
4. Nadie Me Hace Más Feliz Que Tú (feat. Yuridia)
5. No Importa (feat. John Legend)
6. Quién Necesita Mirar
7. Aunque Duela Aceptarlo (feat. Luis Fonsi)
8. Nadie Se Va a Marchar
9. Gracias Por Entrar
10. Lejos
11. Hay Luna Nueva
12. Regresar (Bonus Track)
13. No Importa (Bonus Track)

== Charts ==
Chart (2009)	Peak position
US Top Latin Albums (Billboard)	27
US Latin Pop Albums (Billboard)	10

== Certifications ==
Region	Certification	Certified units/sales
Mexico (AMPROFON)	Gold	30,000^{^}
Venezuela	Platinum	
^{^} Shipments figures based on certification alone.
