= Llueve Por Dentro =

Single by Luis Fonsi

from the album Palabras del Silencio
- Released: June 29, 2009
- Recorded: 2008
- Genre: Latin pop; Pop rock; Latin music; Latin ballad
- Length: 3:58
- Label: Universal Latino
- Songwriters: Luis Fonsi; Amaury Gutiérrez
- Producer: Armando Ávila

Luis Fonsi singles chronology
"Aquí Estoy Yo" (2008)	"Llueve Por Dentro" (2009)	"Aunque Estés Con Él" (2009)

"Llueve Por Dentro" (English: Rains on the Inside) is a ballad performed by Puerto Rican-American singer-songwriter Luis Fonsi. It was officially revealed to be the third single of his most successful album to date Palabras del Silencio (2008) via his official website on June 29, 2009 and will be sent to radios, since his previous single still receives significant airplay in Latin American radio stations.

== Chart performance ==
Chart (2009)	Peak position
US Hot Latin Songs (Billboard)	33
US Latin Pop Airplay (Billboard)	24
