= David Bisbal Edición Europea =

Greatest hits album by David Bisbal
- Released: 4 April 2006
- Genre: Latin pop, pop rock
- Label: Vale Music Spain, S.L.

David Bisbal chronology
Todo Por Ustedes (2005)	David Bisbal Edición Europea (2006)	Premonición (2006)

Singles from David Bisbal
- 1. "Let's Make History" Released: 2006

David Bisbal Edición Europea is an album by Spanish pop-rock singer David Bisbal.

== Album information ==
This special edition CD was released in Spain in October 2006. On the album, David Bisbal interprets songs in the English language such as "The Sun Ain't Gonna Shine (Anymore)", "Cry for Me" and "Stop Loving You". These new songs were accompanied by eleven of the artists past hits including "Ave María", "Dígale", "Lloraré las penas" and "Bulería".

== Track listing ==
1. "The Sun Ain't Gonna Shine (Anymore)"
2. "Me Derrumbo (Crumbling)"
3. "Oye el Boom"
4. "Bulería"
5. "Dígale"
6. "Cry for Me"
7. "Quiero perderme en tu cuerpo"
8. "Lloraré las penas"
9. "Esta Ausencia"
10. "Desnúdate mujer"
11. "Cómo olvidar"
12. "Fuiste mía"
13. "Ave María"
14. "Stop Loving You"
15. "Let's Make History" (a duet with Joana Zimmer; bonus track)
