= Cita en las Nubes =

Cita En Las Nubes

Studio album by Noel Schajris
- Released: 1999
- Genre: Latin pop
- Label: Sony Music

Noel Schajris chronology
Cita En Las Nubes (1999)	Uno No Es Uno (2009)

Cita En Las Nubes is the debut album by Argentine-Mexican singer Noel Schajris released in 1999.

== Track listing ==
1. Iluminame
2. Pobre Corazón
3. Te Espero
4. Para Siempre
5. Donde Nace El Amor
6. ¿A Donde Van Las Nubes?
7. Te Seguiré
8. Cada Vez
9. Siempre Que Tú Estés
10. Volverá El Amor
11. Iluminame (Remix Version)
12. Iluminame (English Version)
