= Bulería (album) =

2004 studio album by David Bisbal

Studio album by David Bisbal
- Released: February 10, 2004
- Recorded: 2004
- Genre: Latin pop
- Label: Vale Music · Universal Music Spain · Universal Music Latino
- Producer: Kike Santander

David Bisbal chronology
Corazón Latino (2002)	Bulería (2004)	Todo Por Ustedes (2005)

Singles from Bulería
- 1. "Bulería" Released: 2004; 2. "Oye El Boom" Released: 2004; 3. "Desnúdate Mujer" Released: 2004; 4. "Camina y Ven" Released: 2004; 5. "Me Derrumbo" Released: 2005; 6. "¿Cómo Olvidar?" Released: 2005; 7. "Esta Ausencia" Released: 2005

Professional ratings
Review scores
Source	Rating
Allmusic	4/5 stars
Los Angeles Times	2.5/4 stars

Bulería is the second studio album recorded by Spanish singer David Bisbal, following Corazón Latino (2002). It was released by Vale Music, Universal Music Spain and Universal Music Latino on February 10, 2004 (see 2004 in music). It is primarily dance music, containing both slow and fast pieces. Two of the songs on the album were co-written by Bisbal. The song "Esta Ausencia" was chosen as theme song for the Mexican telenovela Piel de Otoño (2005), produced by Mapat L. de Zatarain, starring Laura Flores and René Strickler, while Sergio Goyri, Sabine Moussier and Manuel Landeta, starred as antagonists. Gerardo Munguía and María Marcela starred as stellar performances. Raquel Olmedo starred as special participation.

== Track listing ==
1. "Bulería" (Kike Santander, Gustavo Santander) – 4:13
2. "Permítame Señora" (Angel Martinez) – 4:45
3. "Oye El Boom" (K. Santander) – 4:28
4. "Esta Ausencia" (K. Santander) – 4:37
5. "¿Cómo Olvidar?" (Antonio Rayo Sr., José Miguel Velasquez) – 4:34
6. "Me Derrumbo" (Aaron Benward, Jess Cates) – 4:11
7. "Camina y Ven" (K. Santander) – 4:22
8. "Se Acaba" (Ricardo Montaner, K. Santander) – 3:55
9. "Ángel de la Noche" (K. Santander) – 3:26
10. "Desnúdate Mujer" (David Bisbal, Velasquez) – 4:41
11. "Condenado a Tu Amor" (K. Santander) – 4:29
12. "Amores del Sur" (Sergio Domínguez, Markus Johannes Katier, Gabriel Loré) – 3:50

== Singles ==
=== "Desnúdate Mujer" ===
The song is a passionate and sexual ballad, pleading a woman to literally "get naked" and be unfaithful to her partner with the singer. The song peaked at #6 on the Billboard Hot Latin Songs chart.

== Personnel ==
- Pedro Alfonso – Violin, Viola
- Luis Aquino – Trumpet
- Daniel Betancourt – Arranger, Keyboards, Programming, Producer, Wind Arrangements, Choir Arrangement
- David Bisbal – Adaptation, Concept, Improvisation
- Richard Bravo – Percussion
- Ed Calle – Sax (Baritone), Sax (Tenor)
- Jason Carder – Trumpet
- Andres Castro – Guitar (Electric)
- Gustavo Celis – Arranger
- Tony Cousins – Mastering
- Sal Cuevas – Bajo Sexto
- Vicky Echeverria – Coros
- Robin Espejo – Coros
- Paco Fonta – Coro, Palmas
- Francesc Freixes – Graphic Design
- Jose Gaviria – Arranger, Keyboards, Programming, Producer, Coros
- Julio Hernandez – Bajo Sexto
- Lee Levin – Bateria
- Konstantin Litvinenko – Cello
- Miami Symphonic Strings – Cuerda
- José Antonio Molina – Choir Arrangement
- Virginia Moreno – Coro, Palmas
- Tedoy Mullet – Trumpet
- Andrés Múnera – Arranger, Keyboards, Programming, Producer
- Alfredo Oliva – Concert Comedienne
- Bernardo Ossa – Arranger, Keyboards, Programming, Producer, Fender Rhodes
- Rayito – Flamenco Guitar, Palmas
- Catalina Rodríguez – Coros
- Rubendarío – Photography, Estilista
- Milton Salcedo – Piano, Arranger, Keyboards, Programming, Producer, Wind Arrangements, Choir Arrangement
- Juan Sanchez – Flamenco Guitar
- Kike Santander – Arranger, Producer, Fender Rhodes, Wind Arrangements, Dirigida, Choir Arrangement, Improvisation
- Dana Teboe – Trombone
- Ramiro Teran – Arreglos, Coros
- Fernando Tobon – Guitar (Acoustic), Guitar (Electric)
- Camilo Valencia – Wind Arrangements
- Eugenio Vanderhorst – Copista
- Rafael Vergara – Coro, Coros
- Dan Warner – Guitar (Acoustic), Guitar (Electric)

== Charts and certifications ==
=== Charts ===
Chart (2004)	Peak position
Spanish Albums (Promusicae)	1
Swiss Albums (Schweizer Hitparade)	73
US Top Latin Albums (Billboard)	5
US Latin Pop Albums (Billboard)	3
US Heatseekers Albums (Billboard)	13

=== Certifications ===
Region	Certification	Certified units/sales
Argentina (CAPIF)	Gold	20,000^{^}
Colombia	Gold	
Spain (Promusicae)	10× Platinum	1,000,000^{^}
United States (RIAA)	Platinum (Latin)	100,000^{^}
Venezuela	Gold	
Summaries
Europe (IFPI)	Platinum	1,000,000^{*}
^{*} Sales figures based on certification alone.^{^} Shipments figures based on certification alone.

== See also ==
- List of best-selling albums in Spain
