= Día Azul =

Studio album by Jimena Angel
- Released: 11 September 2008
- Recorded: 2005–2007
- Genre: Alternative pop, latin rock
- Length: 38:24
- Label: Universal Music
- Producer: Jimena Angel, Sebastian Krys

Jimena Angel chronology
Día Azul (2008)	Todo Reverdece (2015)

Singles from Día Azul
- 1. "Día Azul" Released: 2008; 2. "Mañana" Released: 2009

Día Azul (Blue Day) is the debut studio album by Colombian singer-songwriter Jimena Angel, released in 2008 by Universal Music Mexico. The album was also nominated to a Latin Grammy for "Best Female Pop Vocal Album" in 2009 but lost to Laura Pausini.

== Track listing ==
All tracks are written by Jimena Angel; except where indicated

No.	Title	Writer(s)	Length
1.	"¿Qué Te Pasa?"	Jimena Angel, Sebastian Krys	2:41
2.	"Deja"	Jimena Angel, Alejandro Gómez Cáceras	3:54
3.	"Si No Estas Conmigo"		3:36
4.	"9:30"	Jimena Angel, Juan Gabriel Turbay	3:13
5.	"Mañana"		3:24
6.	"Fuera de Control"	Jimena Angel, Iván Benavides	2:29
7.	"Día Azul"		3:59
8.	"Como Ayer"	Jimena Angel, Elsten Torres	3:34
9.	"Para Estar Mejor"	Jimena Angel, Alejandro Gómez Cáceras	4:31
10.	"Tengo Ganas"		3:21
11.	"Estas Aquí"	Jimena Angel, Sebastian Krys	3:42
