= Noel Schajris =

Argentine and Mexican musician (born 1974)

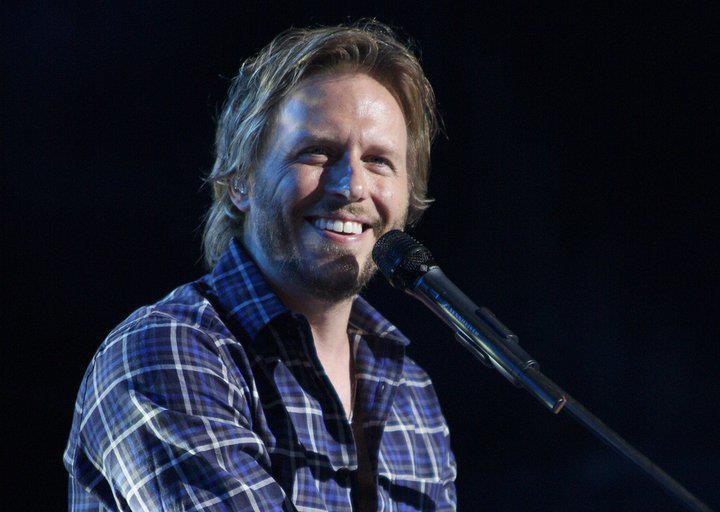
- Schajris performing live in 2013
- Born: Nahuel Schajris Rodríguez; 19 July 1974 (age 51); Buenos Aires, Argentina
- Citizenship: Argentina; Mexico
- Occupations: Singer; songwriter; pianist
- Spouse: Gwendolyn Stevenson (m. 2012)
- Children: 2
- Musical career
- Genres: Latin pop; Latin ballad; Latin rock; pop rock
- Instruments: Vocals; guitar; concertina
- Years active: 1999–present
- Label: Sony Music
- Member of: Sin Bandera
- Website: noelschajris.com

Nahuel Schajris Rodríguez (born July 19, 1974) is an Argentine-Mexican singer, songwriter and pianist based in Mexico who experienced chart-topping success as part of the duo Sin Bandera until he and fellow singer and songwriter Leonel García concluded their partnership in 2007. Schajris began his solo career in 2009 with the release of his first full-length solo album Uno No Es Uno, which was received with critical and commercial success, reaching number 10 on Billboard's Latin Pop Albums chart and number 27 on Billboard's Top Latin Albums chart.

== Career ==
Schajris sang in a quartet with Luis Fonsi on the song "Aquí Estoy Yo" from Fonsi's 2008 album Palabras del Silencio. This quartet also included artists David Bisbal and Aleks Syntek. In December 2008, Brian McKnight's Christmas album featured Schajris performing a verse in Spanish on the track "Silent Night". Schajris has also co-written songs for artists such as Alejandro Fernández, Yuridia, Paulina Rubio, Ednita Nazario, Fanny Lu, and others.

Schajris volunteered in a charity organization called Playing for Change, which accepts donations to help build music schools for underprivileged children. The group records and films musicians from across the planet and posts videos on their website to try and unite the world through music. Noel appeared singing in the upbeat Playing for Change version of the Indian folk song "Chanda Mama". He is now a devotee of Sri Amma and Sri Bhagavan. Since his experience in the Oneness Temple, all of Spain and in the European countries have started to know this man.

He considers Ananda Giri from One World Academy as his longtime spiritual mentor and one of his best friends. In 2010, he co-wrote some songs for Diego Torres' studio album Distinto. In March 2011, he was a judge in the television show Pequenos Gigantes.

== Personal life ==
Noel moved to Mexico in 1997 and later became a Mexican citizen. He married Karla Goudinoff on 21 April 2002, whom he divorced. On February 22, 2012, he married Panamanian model and TV host Gwendolyn Stevenson, and on September 12, 2013, they became parents of Emma.

== Discography ==
- 1999: Cita En Las Nubes
- 2009: Uno No Es Uno
- 2011: Grandes Canciones
- 2014: Verte Nacer
