= Torre De Babel (song) =

Single by David Bisbal featuring Wisin & Yandel

from the album Premonición
- Released: November 25, 2005 (Spain)
- Recorded: 2005
- Genre: Reggaeton; Latin pop; soft rock
- Length: 4:17
- Songwriter: Kike Santander
- Producer: Kike Santander

David Bisbal featuring Wisin & Yandel singles chronology
"Amar Es Lo Que Quiero" (2006)	"Torre De Babel" (2005)	"Hate That I Love You (Remix)" (2007)

"Torre De Babel" (English: Tower of Babel) is the fifth single released on November 25, 2005 from David Bisbal's studio album, Premonición. The remix version features reggaeton duo Wisin & Yandel also included on the album.

The song was covered by Serbian singer Jelena Karleuša for her 2007 album JK Revolution, and Greek singer Kostas Martakis for his 2007 album Anatropi.

== Track listing ==
CD Single

1. Torre De Babel (Reggaeton Mix) (with Vicente Amigo and Wisin & Yandel) [4:17]
2. Torre De Babel (db Original Mix) [3:09]
3. Torre De Babel (Wisin & yandel Remix) [4:19]

== Charts ==
Chart (2007)	Peak position
U.S. Billboard Hot Latin Songs	10
U.S. Billboard Latin Pop Songs	13
U.S. Billboard Tropical Songs	2

== Certifications ==
Region	Certification	Certified units/sales
United States (RIAA)	Platinum (Latin)	60,000^{‡}
^{‡} Sales+streaming figures based on certification alone.
