= Premonición =

Studio album by David Bisbal
- Released: 3 October 2006 (Spain)
- Recorded: 2005–2006
- Genre: Latin pop

David Bisbal chronology
David Bisbal (2006)	Premonición (2006)	Premonición Live (2008)

Singles from Premonición
- 1. "¿Quién Me Iba a Decir?" Released: 21 August 2006; 2. "Silencio" Released: 7 December 2006; 3. "Soldado De Papel" Released: December 2006; 4. "Amar Es Lo Que Quiero" Released: January 2007; 5. "Torre de Babel" Released: 26 May 2007; 6. "Premonición" Released: 2007

Premonición (Premonition) is the third studio album by David Bisbal that was released on 3 October 2006. By 9 October it was certified 5× platinum for shipping 400,000 copies in Spain.

== Singles ==
"Soldado De Papel"

Single by David Bisbal

from the album Premonición
- Released: December 2006 (Spain)
- Genre: Pop rock
- Length: 4:08
- Songwriters: David Bisbal, Rafael Vergara, Mauricio Gasca
- Producer: Sebastian Krys

David Bisbal singles chronology
"Silencio" (2006)	"Soldado De Papel" (2006)	"Amar Es Lo Que Quiero" (2006)

"Soldado De Papel" (English: Paper Soldier) was the third promotional single to be released from the album. The single features Spanish singer Tomatito.

The single was intended for TV promotion. In the song's lyrics, David Bisbal denounces using minors in armed conflicts. The money generated from Bisbal's copyright of "Soldado De Papel" will be donated to the "Spanish Coalition to finish with the Utilization of Children and Girls Soldiers".

== Notable events ==
The following took place in 2006:

- On 2 October the full album was leaked on the Internet.
- In the first week of Spanish sales, Premonición sold more than 400,000 copies.
- On 12 October, in Florida, a representative of Universal Music presented a Golden Disc in recognition of 100,000 copies sold in USA (Latin).
- On 13 October, in the official Billboard 200, Premonición debuted at No. 150 with 6,771 units sold.

== Track listing ==
=== CD ===
1. "¿Quién Me Iba a Decir?" (Kike Santander) – 3:39
2. "Silencio" (Santander) – 3:31
3. "Como La Primera Vez" (David Bisbal, Santander) – 4:01
4. "Torre de Babel (Reggaeton Mix)" (featuring Vicente Amigo y Wisin & Yandel) (Santander) – 4:18
5. "Amar Es Lo Que Quiero" (David Demaría) – 3:30
6. "Soldado De Papel" (Bisbal, Mauricio Gasca, Rafael Vergara) – 4:08
7. "Premonición" (Bisbal, Santander) – 4:07
8. "Cuidar Nuestro Amor (I'll Never Let You Go)" (Bisbal, Christina Christian, Christian Leuzzi, Emanuel Olsson) – 3:47
9. "Calentando Voy (I'm Just Warmin' Up)" (Filipol Carrins, D. Clench, Eric Sanicola) – 3:40
10. "Qué Tendrás" (Daniel Betancourt, Bisbal) – 4:04
11. "Amanecer Sin Tí" (Bisbal, Leuzzi, Vergara) – 3:59
12. "Aquí y Ahora" (Bisbal, Mauricio Gasca, Vergara) – 4:05
13. "Torre de Babel (db Original Mix)" (Santander) – 3:12
14. "Torre de Babel (Wisin & Yandel Remix)" (Santander) – 4:22

=== German Bonus ===
1. Ave María (2007) – 3:31
2. Bulería – 4:13

=== iTunes Bonus ===
1. Cry For Me – 3:32
2. Stop Loving You – 3:38
3. The Sun Ain't Gonna Shine (Anymore) – 3:09

=== DVD ===
1. Making of Grabación Album "Premonición" [DVD]
2. Grabació de La Canción "Quién Me Iba a Decir" [DVD]
3. Entrevista a David Bisbal: El Disco [DVD]
4. Entrevista a David Bisbal: Los Productores [DVD]
5. Entrevista a David Bisbal: Las Canciones [DVD]
6. Entrevista a David Bisbal: Bonus Track [DVD]
7. Quién Me Iba a Decir [Videoclip] [DVD]
8. Making of Grabación Videoclip [DVD]

== Charts and certifications ==
=== Charts ===
Chart (2006)	Peak position
Austrian Albums (Ö3 Austria)	27
Spanish Albums (PROMUSICAE)	1
Swiss Albums (Schweizer Hitparade)	26
US Billboard 200	150
US Top Latin Albums (Billboard)	6
US Latin Pop Albums (Billboard)	5
US Heatseekers Albums (Billboard)	4

=== Certifications ===
Region	Certification	Certified units/sales
Spain (Promusicae)	5× Platinum	400,000^{^}
Venezuela (AVINPRO)	Gold	5,000
Summaries
Latin America	—	250,000
^{^} Shipments figures based on certification alone.

== See also ==
Premonición Live
