= Todo Por Ustedes =

Live album by David Bisbal
- Released: 29 March 2005 (Spain)
- Genre: Latin pop
- Label: Vale Music, Universal Music Spain

David Bisbal chronology
Bulería (album) (2004)	Todo Por Ustedes (2005)	David Bisbal (2006)

Professional ratings
Review scores
Source	Rating
Allmusic	3.5/5 stars

Todo Por Ustedes (English: All for Yours) is a multiple disc album of David Bisbal's concert tour. It contains the entire concert, the making of the "Bulería Tour", interviews, unedited tracks from the Bulería album, and his touring of the United States and Latin America.

The album peaked at 64 and 17 in the Billboard Top Latin Albums and Billboard Latin Pop Albums charts.

== Track listing ==
Disc 1

1. Intro Concierto Bisbal Bulería [DVD][Live]
2. Angel de la Noche [DVD][Live]
3. Fuiste Mia [DVD][Live]
4. Camina y Ven [DVD][Live]
5. Se Acaba [DVD][Live]
6. Corazón Latino [DVD][Live]
7. Permítame Señora [DVD][Live]
8. Quiero Perderme en Tu Cuerpo [DVD][Live]
9. Ave María [DVD][Live]
10. Previo "Como Será" [DVD][Live]
11. Como Será [DVD][Live]
12. Desnúdate Mujer [DVD][Live]
13. Cómo Olvidar [DVD][Live]
14. Dígale [DVD][Live]
15. Esta Ausencia [DVD][Live]
16. Lloraré las Penas [DVD][Live]
17. Me Derrumbo [DVD][Live]
18. Bulería [DVD][Live]
19. Todo Por Ustedes [DVD][Live]
20. Amores del Sur [DVD][Live]
21. Oye el Boom [DVD][Live]
22. Making of de la "Gira Bulería" [DVD]
23. Opción Multiángulo [DVD]

Disc 2

1. Documental "Bulería" en España [DVD]
2. David Bisbal en América [DVD]
3. Premios [DVD]
4. Entrevista [DVD]
5. Extras [DVD]
6. [DVD ROM]

Disc 3

1. Camina y Ven [Live] - 4:32
2. Corazón Latino [Live] - 4:00
3. Quiero Perderme en Tu Cuerpo [Live] - 4:21
4. Esta Ausencia [Live] - 5:17
5. Ave María [Live] - 6:12
6. Desnúdate Mujer [Live] - 4:51
7. Dígale [Live] - 5:29
8. Lloraré las Penas [Live] - 4:51
9. Me Derrumbo [Live] - 4:17
10. Bulería [Live] - 4:18
11. Todo Por Ustedes [Live] - 6:30
12. Oye el Boom [Live] - 4:59
13. Dame el Amor - 3:39
14. Apiádate de Mi - 4:42

== Charts ==
Chart (2005)	Peak position
US Top Latin Albums (Billboard)	64
US Latin Pop Albums (Billboard)	17
