= Tú y Yo (David Bisbal album) =

Studio album by David Bisbal
- Released: March 18, 2014
- Recorded: 2013–2014
- Genre: Latin pop
- Label: Universal Music
- Producer: Sebastian Krys

David Bisbal chronology
Acústico: Una Noche En El Teatro Real (2011)	Tú y Yo (2014)	Hijos del Mar (2016)

Singles from Tú y Yo
- 1. "Para Enamorarte de Mí" Released: September 30, 2013; 2. "Diez Mil Maneras" Released: January 23, 2014; 3. "No Amanece" Released: May 6, 2014; 4. "Tú y Yo" Released: July 1, 2014; 5. "Sí Pero No" Released: August 19, 2014; 6. "Culpable" Released: October 21, 2014

Tú y Yo (You and I) is the fifth studio album of Spanish singer David Bisbal. It was released on March 18, 2014.

== Track listing ==
1. "No Amanece" (3:15)
2. "Sí Pero No" (3:47)
3. "Diez Mil Maneras" (3:33)
4. "Si Aún Te Quieres Quedar" (4:18)
5. "Tú y Yo" (3:49)
6. "Mi Estrella de Cine" (3:15)
7. "Culpable" (Written by Mario Cardoso and Bisbal) (3:51)
8. "Hombre de tu Vida" (feat. Sandy) (3:29)
9. "Burbuja" (3:56)
10. "Lo Que Vendrá" (feat. Antonio Orozco) (3:16)
11. "Olvidé Respirar" (feat. India Martínez) (4:22)
12. "Vida, Qué Locura" (3:41)
13. "Para Enamorarte de Mí" (3:54) (Bonus)
14. "Mama (Ojos Mágicos)" (4:22) (Bonus)
15. "Historia de un Amor" (feat. Marco Antonio Solís) (3:34) (Bonus)
16. "Fuego de Noche, Nieve de Día" (feat. Paty Cantú) (3:30)
17. "Hoy" (3:02) – Tour Edition
18. "Lo Que Vendrá – Solo Version" (3:16) – Tour Edition
19. "Hombre de tu vida – Spanish Version" (feat. Sandy) (3:28) – Tour Edition
20. "Lo Que Vivimos" (3:30) – Tour Edition & iTunes
21. "Si Aún Te Quieres Quedar" (Feat. Cuca Roseta) (3:19) – Gold Edition
22. "Hombre de tu vida – italo/spanish version" (Feat. Emma Marrone) (3:29) – Gold Edition
23. "Ámame – Amami spanish Version" (Feat. Emma Marrone) (3:50) – Gold Edition & iTunes Italy
24. "Unbreakable (Diez Mil Maneras)" (3:29) – Gold Edition
25. "Unbreakable (Diez Mil Maneras) – Club Remix" (5:28) – Gold Edition
26. "Closer Tonight (Freixenet 2014)" (2:00) – Gold Edition
27. "Closer Tonight – FBT Remix" (3:37) – Gold Edition

== Charts ==
=== Weekly charts ===
Weekly chart performance for Tú y Yo
Chart (2014)	Peak position
Spanish Albums (Promusicae)	1
US Top Latin Albums (Billboard)	8
US Latin Pop Albums (Billboard)	3

=== Year-end charts ===
Year-end chart performance for Tú y Yo
Chart (2014)	Position
Spanish Albums (PROMUSICAE)	2
Chart (2015)	Position
Spanish Albums (PROMUSICAE)	53

== Certifications ==
Certifications for Tú y Yo
Region	Certification	Certified units/sales
Argentina (CAPIF)	Gold	20,000^{^}
Mexico (AMPROFON)	Gold	30,000^{^}
Spain (Promusicae)	3× Platinum	120,000^{^}
^{^} Shipments figures based on certification alone.
