= ¿Quién Me Iba a Decir? =

Single by David Bisbal

from the album Premonición
- Released: 25 August 2006 (Spain)
- Genre: Latin, pop, rock
- Length: 3:39
- Songwriter: Kike Santander

David Bisbal singles chronology
"Ave María" (2006)	"¿Quién Me Iba a Decir?" (2006)	"Silencio" (2006)

"¿Quién Me Iba a Decir?" (Spanish: Who Was Going to Tell Me?), is the first official single released from David Bisbal's album Premonición. The single premiered on 25 August 2006. The remix of the song features popular reggaeton duo RKM & Ken-Y.

== Charts ==
Chart (2006)	Peak position
Ibero America Hot 100 Airplay	3
Chile Top 100	1
US Billboard Hot Latin Songs	1
US Latin Tropical Airplay	4
US Billboard Hot 100	101
Mexico Hot 100 Airplay	33

== Certifications ==
Region	Certification	Certified units/sales
United States (RIAA)	Gold (Latin)	30,000^{‡}
^{‡} Sales+streaming figures based on certification alone.
