= Grandes Canciones (Noel Schajris album) =

Studio album by Noel Schajris
- Released: June 7, 2011
- Genre: Latin pop
- Label: Sony Discos

Noel Schajris chronology
Uno No Es Uno (2009)	Grandes Canciones (2011)	Verte Nacer (2014)

Grandes Canciones is the third album by Argentine singer Noel Schajris released on June 7, 2011. It is an album made up of covers of songs made popular by other Spanish-language singers, with one English-language exception; Tears In Heaven, originally recorded by Eric Clapton.

== Track listing ==
1. Quien Como Tú (originally recorded by Ana Gabriel)
2. La Incondicional (originally recorded by Luis Miguel)
3. Bachata Rosa (originally recorded by Juan Luis Guerra y 4.40)
4. Quiero Dormir Cansado (originally recorded by Emmanuel)
5. A Medio Vivir (originally recorded by Ricky Martin)
6. Tu Carcel (originally recorded by Los Bukis)
7. Te Amo (originally recorded by Franco De Vita)
8. Lamento Boliviano (originally recorded by Enanitos Verdes)
9. Si Tú Supieras (originally recorded by Alejandro Fernandez)
10. Mi Historia Entre Tus Dedos (originally recorded by Gianluca Grignani)
11. Tears In Heaven (originally recorded by Eric Clapton)
12. Me Va a Extrañar (originally recorded by Ricardo Montaner)

== Charts ==
Chart (2011)	Peak position
US Top Latin Albums (Billboard)	70
US Latin Pop Albums (Billboard)	17

== Certifications ==
Region	Certification	Certified units/sales
Mexico (AMPROFON)	Platinum	60,000^{^}
Venezuela	Gold	
^{^} Shipments figures based on certification alone.
