= David Bisbal =

Spanish singer (born 1979)

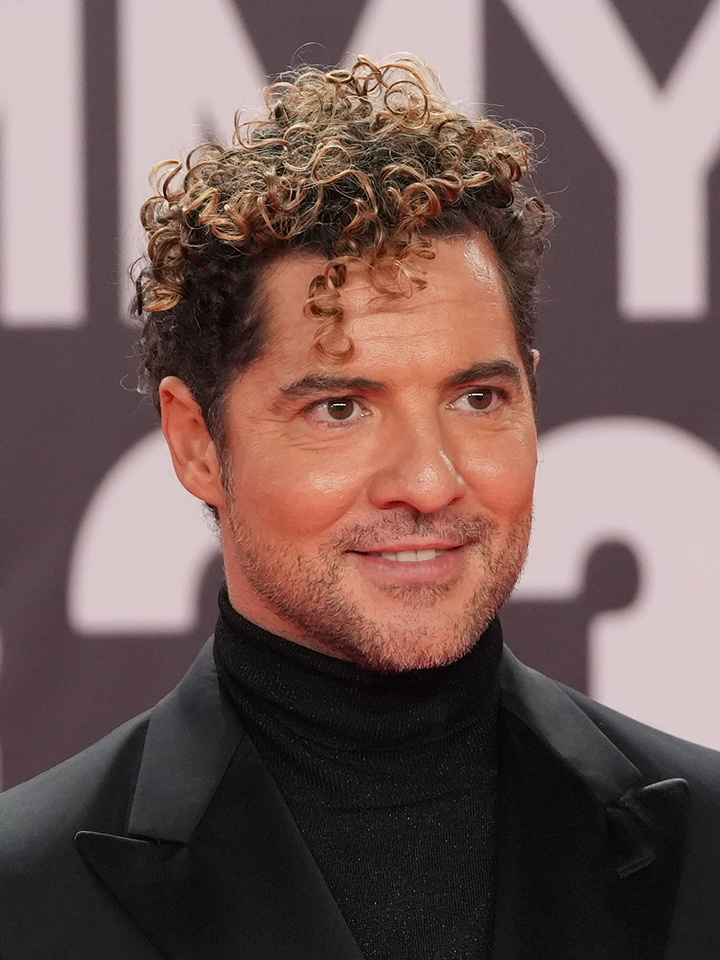
- Bisbal in 2023
- Born: David Bisbal Ferre; 5 June 1979 (age 47); Almería, Andalusia, Spain
- Occupations: Singer; actor
- Years active: 2001-present
- Height: 1.75 m (5 ft 9 in)
- Spouse: Rosanna Zanetti (m. 2018)
- Partners: Chenoa (2001-2005); Elena Tablada (2006-2011)
- Children: 3
- Musical career
- Genres: Latin ballad; Latin pop; pop
- Instrument: Vocals
- Labels: Vale Music (2002-2010); Universal Music Group (2003-present)
- Website: davidbisbal.com

David Bisbal Ferre (born 5 June 1979) is a Spanish singer and actor. He gained his initial fame as the runner-up on the first edition of the reality television talent show Operación Triunfo.

He has since released five studio albums, all of which topped the Spanish Albums Chart, in addition to recording a number of live albums. He has toured throughout Europe and Latin America and is now considered to be a crossover international artist.

As of 2019, David Bisbal has sold more than six million records in Spain and America, getting 69 platinum albums, 20 gold and two diamond. Corazón Latino and Bulería have each received an IFPI Platinum Award, the official certification of having sold over one million copies across Europe.

== Early life ==
David Bisbal was born on 5 June 1979 in Almería, Spain. His parents are José Bisbal, a professional boxer who was Spanish national Bantamweight and Featherweight champion and part of a trio of flamenco musicians, and Maria Ferre Montoya. He is the youngest of three siblings, a brother named José María and a sister named María del Mar. As a child, Bisbal showed a talent for performing, but was always very shy about doing so in public.

Bisbal attended the secondary school IES Al-Andalus in Almería, but dropped out in his second to last year at around age 15. After dropping out, his father took him to work in a greenhouse in Almería, which was his first known job. A few years later he met the producer of Orchestra Expressions, a popular band in Almería. After listening to and discovering his vocal quality, the producer offered him employment as the main singer of the group.

Through his work in Orchestra Expressions, he gradually began to develop as a singer, and to discover his passion for music. David went on to audition for the first series of Operación Triunfo in Barcelona in 2001. He was one of 16 contestants who competed to go to Eurovision 2002 and he came in second place to Rosa López. Bisbal then performed at Eurovision in the backing chorus to Rosa López along with fellow finalists David Bustamante, Chenoa, Gisela and Geno.

== Career ==
=== 2001–2002: Early beginnings and Operación Triunfo ===
In October 2001 he auditioned for the first ever edition of Operación Triunfo (the Spanish original version of Star Academy) where he was accepted and was one of the sixteen contestants. He reached the final, where he placed as the runner-up to Rosa López. The top three contestants qualified for a secondary phase of the contest, where the prize was the chance of representing Spain in the 47th edition of the Eurovision Song Contest. He came second in the Eurovision phase with the song "Corazón Latino", losing again to Rosa López. She went on to sing "Europe's Living a Celebration" in that Eurovision held in Tallinn. Bisbal accompanied her there as one of the backing singers.

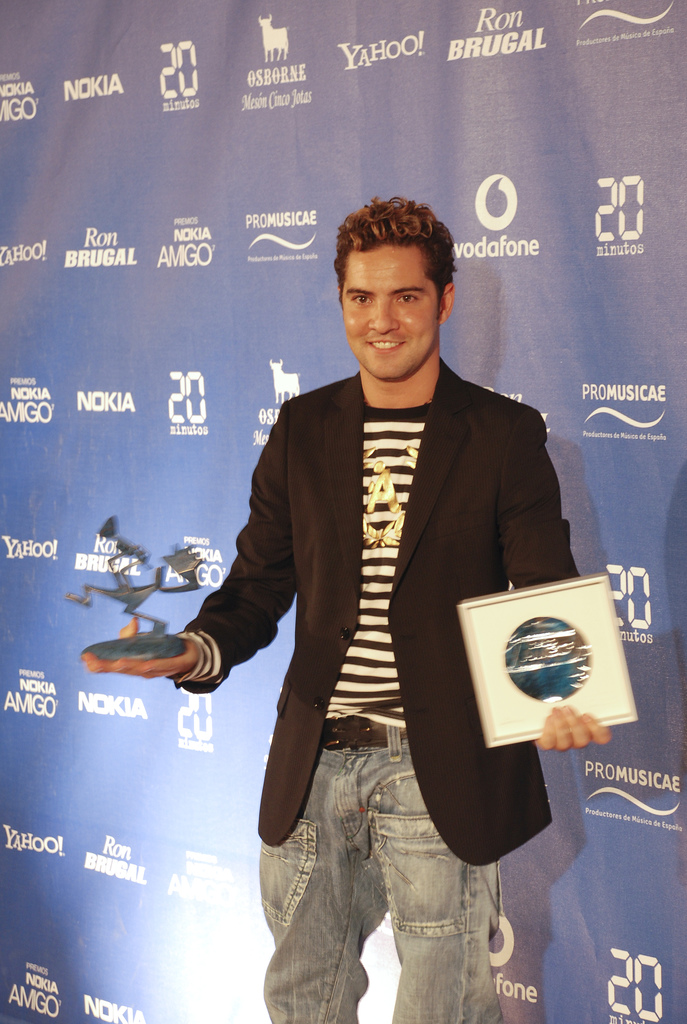
David Bisbal, at Los Premios Nokia Amigo, 2007

Bisbal signed a contract with Vale Music Record label and released his first album, recorded in Miami under the title Corazón Latino with producer and songwriter Kike Santander. The album went platinum 7 times by summer 2002, after having topped the Spanish charts. The first single from the album, called Ave María, had a phenomenal success. After winning a Latin Grammy, the album went platinum (over 1 million in sales).

=== 2002–2003: International launch debut album ===
After achieving fame as Operación Triunfo finalist, he signed a contract with label Vale Music, offering him the opportunity to record his first solo debut album. The album, entitled Corazón Latino, was released in Summer 2002, recorded in Miami and produced by Kike Santander. The album reached number one in its debut week selling over 600,000 copies, breaking sales records; the album stayed for seven consecutive weeks at number one on the Spanish Albums Chart. With more than 1,300,000 copies sold in Spain, Bisbal was launched to the rest of the Spanish-speaking world; his debut album would be released on 15 October. In January 2003, Bisbal received an Amigo award in Madrid's Palacio de Cristal de la Arganzuela. On 31 October he began his first tour of Latin America in Argentina; he visited 12 countries and performed 17 live concerts. In November, a special issue of Corazón Latino was released in Mexico.

=== 2004–2005: Bulería, the second million record sales ===
On 10 February 2004, he released his second album entitled Bulería, again produced by his friend Kike Santander. It found similar success in Spain and throughout Latin America, hitting the diamond certification with more than 1 million albums sold in Spain alone, and becoming the best Spanish seller of 2004.

The first single from Bisbal's second album, "Bulería", premiered on 15 December 2003. It reached number 1 on the charts and radio stations of both Spain and Latin America. On 11 February, the eponymous album was released. The album debuted on the charts in Spain, where more than 300,000 copies were sold in a week. It also reached gold certification in Colombia and Venezuela within two weeks.

In March 2005, he also released a DVD Todo Por Ustedes that contained live recordings of some of his concerts in the United States, Latin America and Spain.

He first set foot in Germany in November in order to promote his duet with singer Joana Zimmer. The duet's theme was "Let's make history". Several days after presenting the video with Joana Zimmer, David performed at the Tribute to Rocío Jurado Gala.

=== 2006–2008: Premonición and promotion in Europe and Japan ===
The first single of his third studio album Premonición, "Quién me iba a decir" was released in August 2006. The album was released on 3 October 2006. It sold more than 900,000 copies.

Premonición was the third studio album by David Bisbal released on 3 October 2006. By the end of its first week of release, it had achieved enough sales to be certified as 5 times platinum with sales of over 400,000 copies in Spain alone.

On 24 October he performed at the seat of European Parliament in Strasbourg in an exclusive concert in which he performed the songs from his album to representatives of 25 member countries. The album stayed for a month at number one on the Spanish chart. The singer won an Ondas Award in a ceremony held at the Barcelona Teatre Musical, and a Micrófono de Oro award. In January 2007, the second single from the album "Silencio" stayed for eight weeks at number one in Los 40 Principales, Spain's Top 40 Chart.

In 2008, Bisbal performed a duet with Rihanna, "Hate That I Love You", which was included in the re-issue of Good Girl Gone Bad.

=== 2009–2010: Sin Mirar Atrás ===
His fourth studio album Sin Mirar Atrás was released on 20 October 2009 in Spain, Latin America and the United States. The first single from the album was "Esclavo de tus Besos", under the production of Mexican-born Armando Ávila. Its world premiere was on 24 August and the video came out on 7 September. It was one of the most successful singles of the Spanish singer in his career, reaching number 1 on sales and radio charts in Spain, Latin America and the United States.

On 20 October 2009, Bisbal released Sin Mirar Atrás, receiving positive reviews. David worked with writer/producer DJ Sammy on the track "Aqui Ahora", which is featured on the album Premonición.

On 9 January 2010, Promusicae announced that "Esclavo de Tus Besos" had earned a double platinum certification for its more than 80,000 copies sold in Spain, and it also earned a platinum certification in Argentina for more than 20,000 copies sold. The second single from the album was "Mi Princesa". The song "24 Horas" made with Mexican singer Espinoza Paz, was the third single in the U.S. and Latin America and was presented at the 2010 Billboard Awards, while in Spain the single was "Sin Mirar Atrás", a song that gave title to the album. Bisbal also won his first Latin Grammy in 2009. On 14 November 2010 he was presented the Gold Record for the sales of the album in USA and Puerto Rico.

=== 2011–present: Herederos and The Voice ===
David Bisbal sang the theme song for the soap opera Herederos de una venganza. It is one of the highest rated telenovelas in Argentina, which starred Romina Gaetani, Luciano Castro and Federico Amador, where all romantic moments are set to music by the song sung by David Bisbal. The songwriters of this release were Bisbal himself, Sebastian Bazan, and Karen Oliver.

On 5 November 2011 he released his first acoustic performance, a DVD/CD pack titled Una noche en el Teatro Real, recorded in the Madrid's main opera house, the Teatro Real (Royal Theatre), four days earlier. In its first week on sale, it set a record: the first time a DVD/CD set surpassed sales of CDs on the Spanish charts, selling more than 50,000 copies in seven days, and obtaining double platinum status. On 18 January, sales reached triple platinum, with more than 75,000 copies sold. In 2012, his CD Live at the Royal Albert Hall was certified platinum in Spain.

During the tour of "Una noche en el Teatro Real", Bisbal played in some of the most iconic theatres and auditoriums in Spain, North America, Latin America, and major European capitals. He played a total of 128 concerts in such unique venues as the Royal Albert Hall in London, Carnegie Hall in New York, and Luna Park in Buenos Aires. Writing about Bisbal's Albert Hall concert in September 2012, Boris Izaguirre described him as "the voice of Spanish emigrants" and "The Julio Iglesias of the lost generation", noting that many Spaniards in their twenties who had been forced by the 2008–2014 Spanish financial crisis to emigrate had grown up during Bisbal's rise to fame in the previous decade's economic boom. On 15 November 2012, in Las Vegas, David Bisbal won his third Latin Grammy, this time in the category "Best Traditional Pop Album".

Bisbal's career took a turn towards its beginnings when he joined the Spanish reality talent show La Voz as a judge, acting as coach to eventual winner Rafa Blas in the first series. In addition he was a judge on La Voz... México on the third series of the show. However, in January 2014 after appearing on two seasons of the Spanish show and one of the Mexican edition, Bisbal announced he would leave these roles due to a heavy schedule of live and promotional work for his new album Tú y Yo. In mid-2016, he was a mentor on the show La Apuesta in which he was the winner with his fellow contestant Héctor Osobampo.

In 2017 Bisbal released the album Hijos del mar. Four singles were released: "Antes que no", "Duele demasiado", "Lo tenga o no" and "Fiebre". For the latter, Bisbal recorded a video clip in Los Angeles with Mexican vlogger Caeli and Spanish model Silvia Kal.

In June 2018 Aitana was invited by David Bisbal to sing at the Palau Sant Jordi. Both sang Mi princesa, a song by Bisbal.

In 2020, Carrie Underwood teamed up with David Bisbal for a new single, "Tears of Gold." The song marks Underwood's first-ever bilingual single, with both vocalists singing in English and in Spanish.

On 27 April 2022 he was announced as a coach on the program La Voz... México alongside Ha*Ash, Yuridia and Joss Favela.

== International appeal ==
Internationally, Bisbal enjoys popularity in a great number of countries.

- On 3 September 2003, he won the Latin Grammy for "Best New Artist". During the event, He sang Angels, with Jessica Simpson. He also launched a big promotional tour in Latin America with sold-out concerts in Argentina, Brazil, Mexico, Puerto Rico, Venezuela and others.
- In 2008, he recorded Hate That I Love You (Odio Amarte), a Spanglish version with Rihanna. He achieved European success in England, Germany, Belgium, Russia and Romania in addition to great success in Japan.
- In 2009, he recorded "Sufrirás" a Spanglish duet with singer Pixie Lott, eventually released as a platinum bonus track on the Deluxe Edition of his fourth studio album, Sin Mirar Atrás.
- In 2010 David was featured in the Spanish version of the FIFA 2010 Official World Cup song Waving Flag with Somali-Canadian Musician K'naan who is the original artist of the song.
- In 2010, A remix version of Miley Cyrus's When I Look At You, titled "Te miro a ti", was released on one of his albums in order to promote the release of The Last Song in Spain; in it, Cyrus sings her lines in English, while Bisbal's are mingled in both English and Spanish.
- In 2011 David recorded a song for the TV series "Herederos" in Argentina. The song is called "Herederos" and David has sold over 300,000 copies of the cd "Sin Mirar Atrás Tour" in Argentina.
- On 15 November 2012, he won the Latin Grammy held in Las Vegas from the category "Best Traditional Pop Album" for "Una Noche en el Teatro Real".
- In 2013, Bisbal acted as himself in the TV series Jane the Virgin where he sang "Esclavo de sus besos" he appeared one episode.

== Personal life ==
He has a daughter with designer Elena Tablada.

He also has a son, Mateo with Venezuelan actress and model Rosanna Zanetti, whom he married on 2 July 2018.

== Discography ==
=== Studio albums ===
Year	Title	Chart positions					Sales and certifications
Year	Title	SPA	US Latin	GER	SWI	AUT	Sales and certifications
2002	Corazón Latino: Released: 15 October 2002; Format: CD	1	13	–	–	–	Worldwide sales: 2,000,000; Spain sales: 1,300,000; PROMUSICAE: 13× Platinum; AMPROFON: Gold; CAPIF: Gold; RIAA: Platinum (Latin)
2004	Bulería: Released: 10 February 2004; Format: CD	1	5	–	–	73	Worldwide sales: 1,300,000; Spain sales: 1,000,000; PROMUSICAE: 10× Platinum; CAPIF: Gold; RIAA: Platinum (Latin)
2006	Premonición: Released: 3 October 2006; Format: CD, download	1	6	41	26	27	Worldwide sales: 1,000,000; Spain sales: 400,000; PROMUSICAE: 5× Platinum
2009	Sin Mirar Atrás: Released: 20 October 2009; Formats: CD, download	1	1	–	81	–	Worldwide sales: 550,000+ Spain sales: 200,000+ PROMUSICAE: 3× Platinum; CAPIF: Gold
2014	Tú y Yo: Released: 18 March 2014; Formats: CD, download	1	8	–	–	–	Spain sales: 160,000+ PROMUSICAE: 3× Platinum; AMPROFON: Gold; CAPIF: Gold; IFPI: Gold
2016	Hijos del Mar: Released: 2 December 2016; Formats: CD, download	1	4	–	–	–	Spain sales: 50,000+ PROMUSICAE: Platinum
2020	En Tus Planes: Released: 3 January 2020; Formats: CD, download	1	–	–	–	–	Spain sales: 40,000+ PROMUSICAE: Platinum
2023	Me Siento Vivo: Released: 28 September 2023; Formats: CD, download	1	–	–	–	–	
2026	Eternos: Released: 5 October 2026; Formats: CD, download	2	–	–	–	–	

=== Live albums ===
Year	Title	Chart positions		Sales and certifications
Year	Title	SPA	US Latin	Sales and certifications
2005	Todo Por Ustedes: Released: 29 March 2005 (Spain), 24 May 2005 (United States, Latin America); Formats: 2 DVDs + CD	1	64	Worldwide sales: 100,000; Spain sales: 75,000; PROMUSICAE: Gold
2007	Premonición Live: Released: 27 November 2007 (Worldwide); Formats: 2 DVDs + 2CDs	68	75	Worldwide sales: 100,000; Spain sales: 40,000; PROMUSICAE: Gold
2011	Acústico: Una Noche En El Teatro Real: Released: 6 December 2011 (Spain); Formats: 2 DVDs + 2CDs	45	14	Spain sales: 75,000; PROMUSICAE: 3× Platinum; AMPROFON: Gold
2013	Live at the Royal Albert Hall: Released: January 2013 (Spain); Format: CD	28	49	Spain sales: 40,000; PROMUSICAE: Platinum
2015	Tu Y Yo En Vivo: Released: 18 December 2015; Format: CD	–	–	

=== Compilation albums ===
Year	Title	Chart positions	Sales and certifications
Year	Title	SPA	Sales and certifications
2006	David Bisbal Edicion Europea: Released: 4 April 2006 (Worldwide); Format: CD	18	Worldwide sales: 150,000; Spain sales: 40,000; PROMUSICAE: Gold
2014	Lo Mejor de David Bisbal: Released: March 2014 (Spain); Format: CD	32	
2021	20 Años Contigo: Released: December 2021 (Spain); Format: CD	2	

=== Singles ===
Title	Year	Chart positions										Album
Title	Year	SPA	US Latin	GER	FRA	SWI	AUT	ARG	CHI	MEX	COL	Album
"Ave María"	2002	1	—	8	—	—	—	12	7	29	24	Corazón Latino
"Lloraré Las Penas"	2002	1	3	—	—	—	—	10	17	25	—	Corazón Latino
"Dígale"	2002	1	15	—	—	—	—	—	5	17	—	Corazón Latino
"Quiero Perderme En Tu Cuerpo"	2003	24	—	—	—	—	—	—	—	—	—	Corazón Latino
"Cómo Será"	2003	—	—	—	—	—	—	—	—	—	—	Non-album single
"Rosa y Espinas" (with David Civera)	2003	1	—	—	—	—	—	—	—	—	—	La Chiqui Big Band
"Bulería"	2004	1	11	—	—	—	—	6	—	15	9	Bulería
"Oye El Boom"	2004	1	—	—	—	—	—	5	—	17	13	Bulería
"Desnúdate Mujer"	2004	—	6	—	—	—	—	—	16	24	—	Bulería
"Camina Y Ven"	2004	1	40	—	—	—	—	—	—	—	—	Bulería
"Me Derrumbo"	2005	5	—	—	—	—	—	—	—	—	—	Bulería
"Cómo Olvidar"	2005	1	—	—	—	—	—	—	—	—	—	Bulería
"Esta Ausencia"	2005	—	7	—	—	—	—	18	—	13	—	Bulería
"Todo Por Ustedes"	2005	—	—	—	—	—	—	—	—	—	—	Todo Por Ustedes
"Let's Make History" (with Joana Zimmer)	2006	5	—	—	48	23	—	—	—	—	—	David Bisbal
"Quien Me Iba A Decir"	2006	1	1	—	—	—	—	1	11	33	13	Premonición
"Silencio"	2006	1	32	13	—	10	6	—	—	—	—	Premonición
"Soldado De Papel" (with Tomatito)	2006	—	—	—	—	—	—	—	—	—	—	Premonición
"Amar Es Lo Que Quiero"	2007	—	6	—	—	—	—	—	—	24*	—	Premonición
"Torre De Babel" (with Vicente Amigo & Wisin & Yandel)	2007	1	10	—	—	—	—	—	—	—	—	Premonición
"Premonición"	2007	6	—	—	—	—	—	—	—	—	—	Premonición
"Hate That I Love You (Spanglish version)" (with Rihanna)	2008	2	—	—	—	—	—	2	11	26	—	Premonición Live
"Esclavo de Sus Besos"	2009	1	1	—	—	—	—	1	10	1	1	Sin Mirar Atrás
"Mi Princesa"	2009	1	35	—	—	—	—	34	12	1	—	Sin Mirar Atrás
"Wavin' Flag (Spanish Celebration Mix) (with K'Naan)	2010	2	—	—	—	—	—	2	4	1	—	Troubadour
"Soñar (My Life)"	2010	—	—	—	—	—	—	—	—	—	—	Despicable Me
"Sin Mirar Atrás"	2010	42	—	—	—	—	—	17	76	—	—	Sin Mirar Atrás (and 24 Horas edition)
"24 horas"	2010	—	27	—	—	—	—	—	—	—	—	Sin Mirar Atrás (and 24 Horas edition)
"Ave Maria" (re-release)	2011	26	—	—	—	—	—	—	—	—	—	Acústico – Una noche en el teatro real
"Sombra y luz" (Versión acústica)	2012	32	—	—	—	—	—	—	—	—	—	Acústico – Una noche en el teatro real
"No hay 2 sin 3 (Gol)" (Cali & El Dandee feat. David Bisbal)	2012	1	—	—	—	—	—	—	—	—	—	Non-album singles
"Hasta el final"	2012	34	—	—	—	—	—	—	—	—	—	Non-album singles
"Para enamorarte de mí"	2013	16	—	—	—	—	—	—	—	—	—	Tú y Yo
"Diez Mil Maneras"	2014	1	40	—	—	—	—	—	14	5	—	Tú y Yo
"Tú y Yo"	2014	8	—	—	—	—	—	—	—	—	—	Tú y Yo
"Sí pero no"	2014	6	—	—	—	—	—	—	—	—	—	Tú y Yo
"No amanece"	2014	4	—	—	—	—	—	—	—	—	—	Tú y Yo
"Olvidé respirar" (with India Martínez)	2014	27	—	—	—	—	—	—	—	—	—	Tú y Yo
"El ruido"	2015	45	—	—	—	—	—	—	—	—	—	Non-album singles
"Me enamoré de ti"	2016	13	—	—	—	—	—	—	—	—	—	Non-album singles
"Corazón que miente"	2016	17	—	—	—	—	—	—	—	—	—	Non-album singles
"Antes que no"	2016	18	—	—	—	—	—	—	—	—	—	Hijos del Mar
"Escondidos" (with Chenoa)	2016	18	—	—	—	—	—	—	—	—	—	Non-album single
"Duele demasiado"	2016	—	—	—	—	—	—	—	—	—	—	Hijos del Mar
"Fiebre"	2016	77	—	—	—	—	—	—	—	—	—	Hijos del Mar
"Todo Es Posible" (featuring Tini)	2017	—	—	—	—	—	—	—	—	—	42	Tadeo Jones 2: El secreto del Rey Midas
"Si No Te Hubieras Ido" (with Juan Luis Guerra)	2017	—	—	—	—	—	—	—	—	—	—	Non-album single
"A Partir De Hoy" (with Sebastián Yatra)	2018	7	7	—	—	—	—	6	15	15	9	En Tus Planes
"Perdón" (with Greeicy Rendón)	2018	31	—	—	—	—	—	—	—	—	—	En Tus Planes
"Tú Eres La Magia"	2019	—	—	—	—	—	—	—	—	—	—	El Parque Mágico
"Bésame" (with Juan Magán)	2019	22	—	—	—	—	—	—	—	—	—	En Tus Planes
"Abriré La Puerta" (with Alejandro Fernández)	2019	—	—	—	—	—	—	—	—	—	—	En Tus Planes
"Mucho Más Allá"	2019	—	—	—	—	—	—	—	—	—	—	Frozen 2
"I'll Be Home for Christmas/Estaré En Mi Casa Esta Navidad" (with Idina Menzel)	2019	—	—	—	—	—	—	—	—	—	—	Christmas: A Season of Love
"En Tus Planes"	2019	78	—	—	—	—	—	—	—	—	—	En Tus Planes
"Si Tú La Quieres" (featuring Aitana)	2020	13	—	—	—	—	—	—	—	—	—	Non-album single
"Tears of Gold" (with Carrie Underwood)	2020	—	—	—	—	—	—	—	—	—	—	En Tus Planes
"A Contracorriente" (with Álvaro Soler)	2022	43	—	—	—	—	—	—	—	—	—	Non-album singles
"Se Nos Rompió El Amor"	2022	—	—	—	—	—	—	—	—	—	—	Non-album singles
"Tú Me Delatas"	2022	—	—	—	—	—	—	—	—	—	—	Non-album singles
"Quiero Ser Yo (Ese Hombre)" (with Los Ángeles Azules)	2022	—	—	—	—	—	—	—	—	—	—	Cumbia Del Corazón
"Ajedrez"	2023	96	—	—	—	—	—	—	—	—	—	Me Siento Vivo
"Himno de Andalucía"	2023	—	—	—	—	—	—	—	—	—	—	Non-album single
"Ay, Ay, Ay"	2023	—	—	—	—	—	—	—	—	—	—	Me Siento Vivo
"Tengo Roto El Corazón"	2023	—	—	—	—	—	—	—	—	—	—	Me Siento Vivo
"Me Siento Vivo"	2023	—	—	—	—	—	—	—	—	—	—	Me Siento Vivo
"Ahora" (with Carlos Rivera)	2024	—	—	—	—	—	—	—	—	—	—	Non-album single
"Rueda" (with Rvfv)	2024	20	—	—	—	—	—	—	—	—	—	El Tiburón
"Todo Es Posible En Navidad"	2024	12	—	—	—	—	—	—	—	—	—	Todo Es Posible En Navidad
"El Burrito Sabanero"	2024	9	—	—	—	—	—	—	—	—	—	Todo Es Posible En Navidad
"Te Sigo Amando" (with Luciano Pereyra)	2025	—	—	—	—	—	—	—	—	—	—	Non-album single

=== Other appearances ===
List of other appearances, showing year released and album name
Title	Year	Other artist(s)	Album
"Te Mueves Tú, Se Mueven Todos"	2014	Ha*Ash, Reik	Non-album

Preceded by (Sweden) Barbados	OGAE Second Chance Contest winner 2002	Succeeded by (Sweden) Alcazar
