= La Voz (Mexican TV series) season 8 =

La Voz
- Season 8
- Hosted by: Jimena Pérez
- Coaches: Lupillo Rivera; Belinda; Yahir; Ricardo Montaner
- Winner: Fátima Domínguez
- Winning coach: Lupillo Rivera
- Runner-up: Leo Rosas

Release
- Original network: Azteca Uno
- Original release: March 12 – July 1, 2019

Season chronology
- ← Previous; Season 7 Next → Season 9

The eighth season of La Voz premiered March 12, 2019 on Azteca Uno. Lupillo Rivera, Belinda, Yahir, and Ricardo Montaner joined as new coaches replacing Natalia Jiménez, Carlos Rivera, Anitta, and Maluma, respectively. Whereas, Jimena Pérez became the new host of the show.

This is the first season being produced by TV Azteca after they acquired the show's rights from Televisa. Due to the change of broadcast channel, it featured new coaches and host, as well as a few format changes.

This season the coaches are supposed to close their teams with 51 members each, instead of the usual 12. Another change were the Knockouts which came before the Battles, and featured 3 artists facing each other instead of 2. After the Knockouts, came the Battles, Top 3, and finally the Live Shows.

On Tuesday, July 1, 2019, Fátima Domínguez was announced the winner and crowned La Voz México 2019, alongside her coach Lupillo Rivera. This makes the third coach last name "Rivera" to win the show, Jenni Rivera being Lupillo's sister.

== Coaches ==
La Voz México season 8 coaches

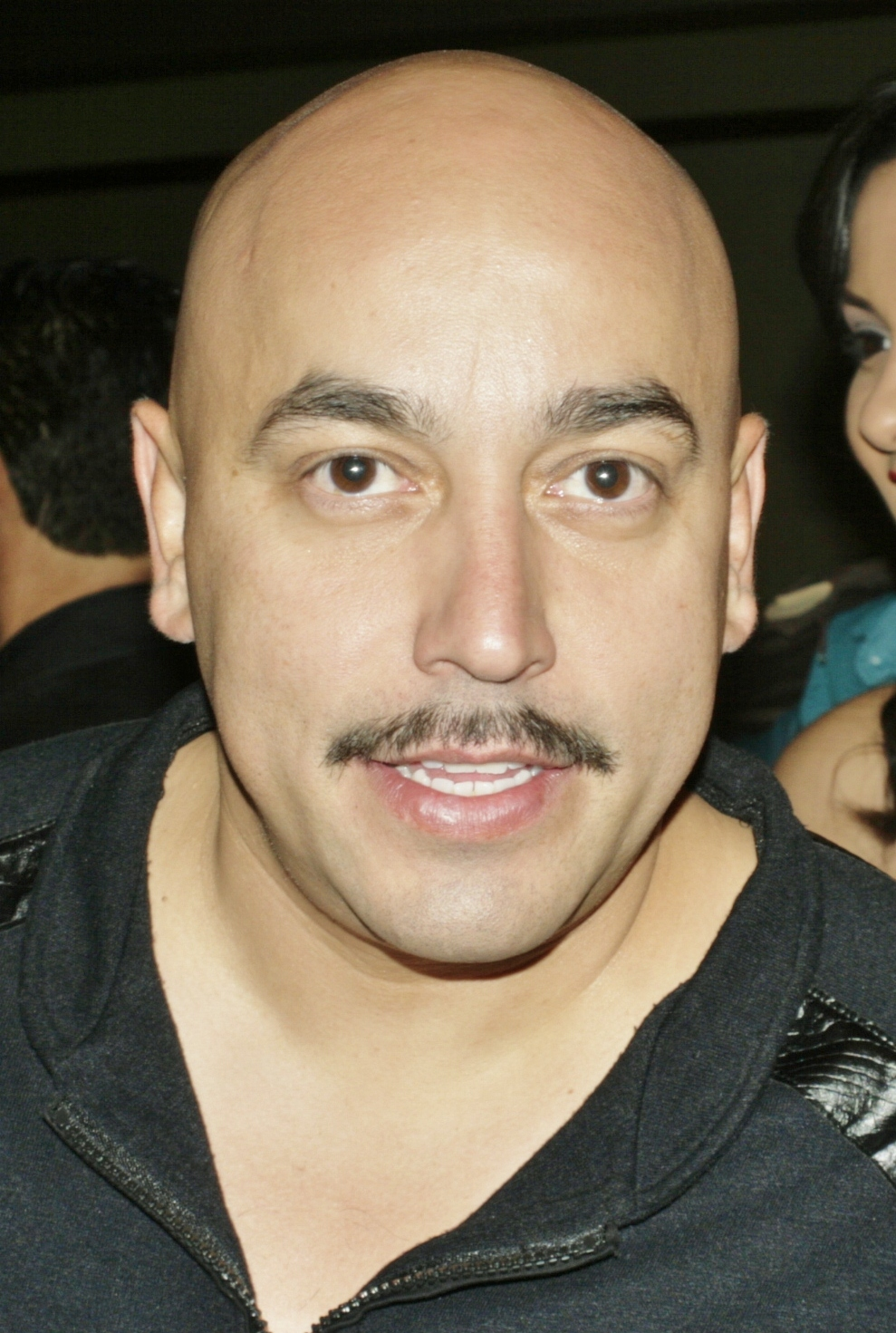
Lupillo Rivera

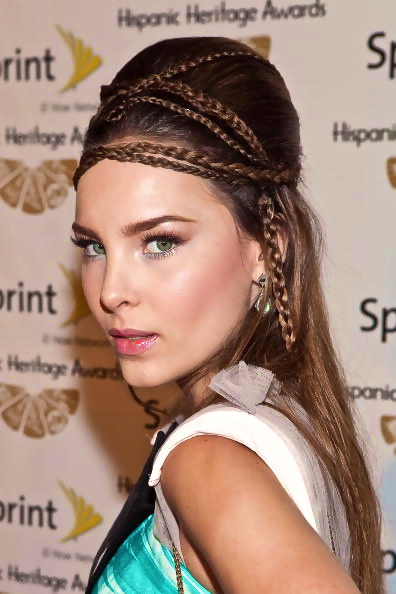
Belinda

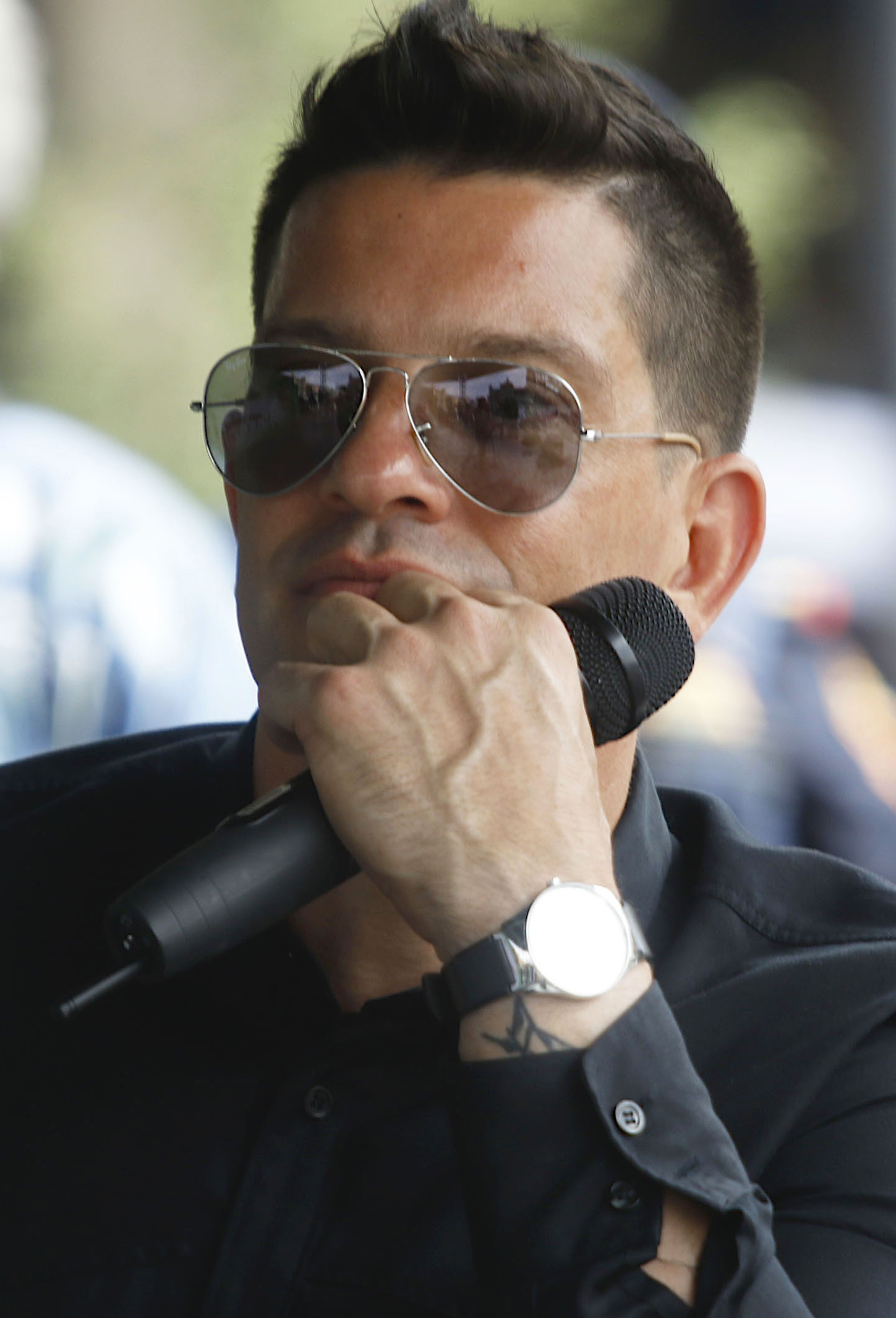
Yahir

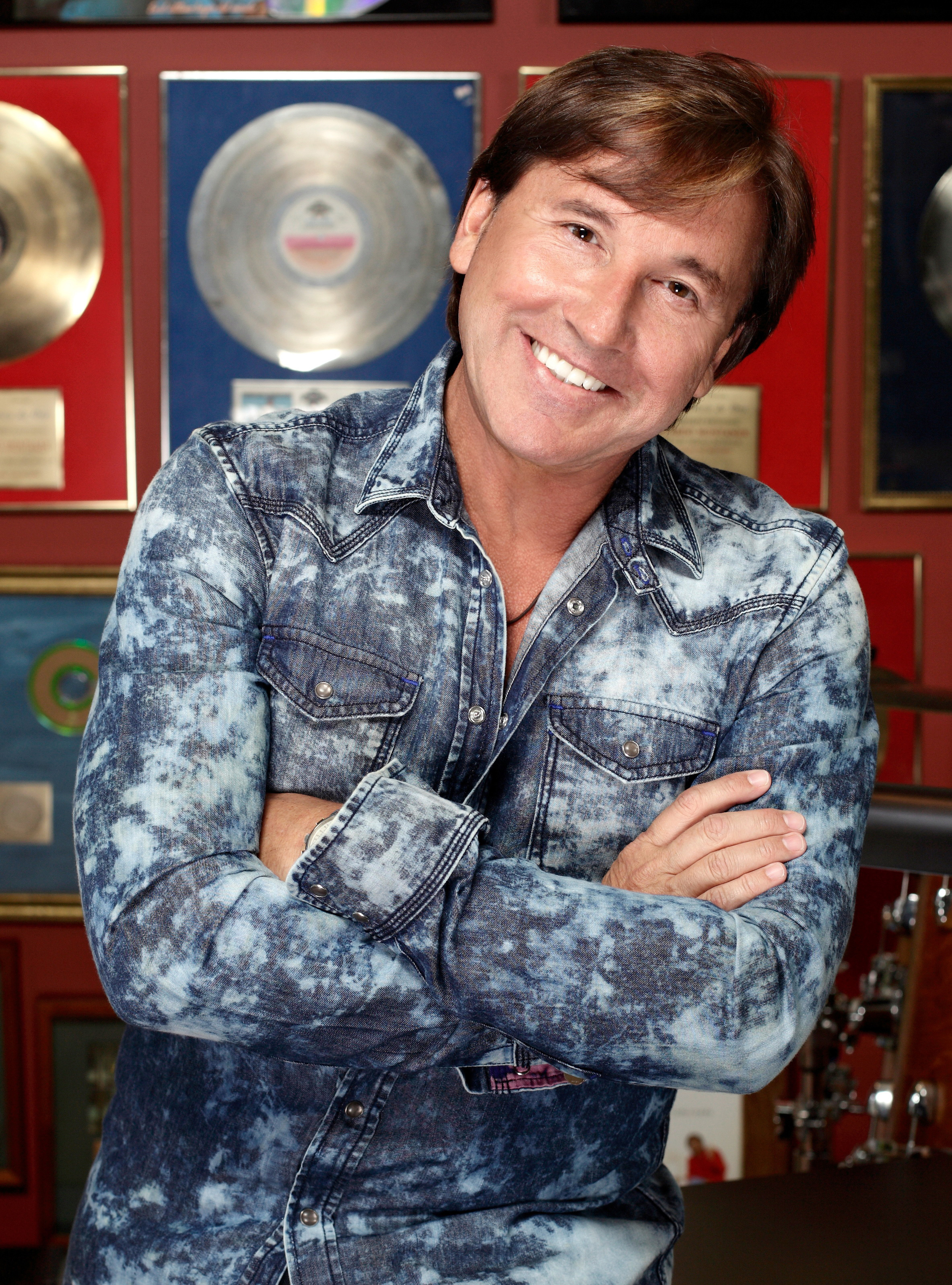
Ricardo Montaner

Due to the show's rights being obtained by TV Azteca starting in 2020, it had to feature a brand new cast due to former coaches having contract with Televisa. On February 12, 2019, TV Azteca announced Belinda as their first coach. Former contestant of Azteca's high-rated La Academia, and now successful singer, Yahir and international star, Ricardo Montaner were confirmed as the second and third coaches of the new edition. Later, Jimena Pérez was announced as the new host. Lupillo Rivera closed the coach openings, as the final coach announced.

== Teams ==
Color key

- Winner
- Runner-up
- Third place
- Fourth place
- Eliminated in the Live Shows
- Eliminated in the Top 3
- Stolen in the Battles
- Eliminated in the Battles
- Stolen in the Knockouts
- Eliminated in the Knockouts

Coaches	Top 204 artists				
Lupillo Rivera					
Lupillo Rivera	Fátima Domínguez	José de Jesús	Miguel Rivera	Rose Merlin	Mario Heredia
Lupillo Rivera	Pame Larré	Irasema	Lalo Arriola	Diana Díaz	Karoll Flores
Lupillo Rivera	Eli Zamora	Yael González	~~Yomi Ascasio~~	Axxl Mart	Carlos Rubén Loaiza
Lupillo Rivera	Diana Laura Domínguez	Diana Mellado	Ana Loaiza	Tania Gutíerrez	Alan Ponce
Lupillo Rivera	Majo	Gaby Luna	~~Begoña Ibarreche~~	~~Chamo Perdomo~~	Laura Cuevas
Lupillo Rivera	César Antulio	Reyna Avelar	Mildred Soto	Rosalba Montero	Joab Zuñiga
Lupillo Rivera	Carolina Hérnandez	Natalia Marty	Luz Ruiz	Ale Capellini	Carlos Cabrera
Lupillo Rivera	Krisna Fernández	Sarah Salgado	Tavo Catalan	Nayeli Sosa	Karla Sofía
Lupillo Rivera	Pamela Calzadilla	Gersos Solís	Gaby García	Gaby Berumen	Gabby Ángel
Lupillo Rivera	Michel Báez	Rebeca Aviles	Robie Rojas	Nicholas Griffin	Arath Jiménez
Lupillo Rivera	Karla Temis	Karime Lacayo	Bryanda Armenta	Doménica	Fernanda Velázquez
Lupillo Rivera	Marisela Beltrán				
Belinda					
Belinda	Viviann Baeza	Lucas Martín	Meli G	Majo Alcocer	Rodrigo Decuir
Belinda	Dave Shaman	Carlos Alba	Alex Guillén	Keyla Lencioni	Luisa Mata
Belinda	Zuhe Riestra	Rodo González	~~Eli Zamora~~	~~Euge Hernández~~	~~Germaine~~
Belinda	~~Lalo Arriola~~	Alecs Báez	Duo One	Alan Jos	Steven Sibaja
Belinda	Max Barragán	Ilayali Bolívar	~~Bettina y Óscar~~	~~Axxl Mart~~	~~Karoll Flores~~
Belinda	~~Diana Leoport~~	Rodrigo Alejo	Nat Hernández	Tanya Ugalde	Martín Pantoja
Belinda	Rosselly Valladolid	Karla Martínez	Maríana de la Garza	Cecilia Villalba	Laura Drevos
Belinda	Ayax Andoni	Paulina Sosa	Isabella Curi	Jordi D'Luz	Ren Munguía
Belinda	Maríana Escobedo	Diana Paty González	Nancy Elizabeth	Fernanda Rodríguez	Moni Campos
Belinda	Yuselén Valencia	Manuel Alejandro	Cameron García	Brenda Rosh	Rani
Belinda	Clyde Guerra	Evelyn Bañuelos	Karla " Kai" Díaz	Flor Soto	Macurena
Belinda	Maríana Gómez				
Yahir					
Yahir	Leo Rosas	Tenoch Niño de Rivera	Daniela González	T-Love	Guillermo Salazar
Yahir	Alexander Juli	Omar Pérez	Germaine	Caro Molina	Mitzy Yamet
Yahir	Arantza Hernández	Bettina y Óscar	Jimena Segovia	Karen Romero	Joey Benjamín
Yahir	Nicole García	Jair Gentleman	Edna Martín	Nelly Burguette	Omar Sago
Yahir	Roberto Navarro	Duzan	~~Eli Zamora~~	Roberto "Ro" Blázquez	Manuel Vázquez
Yahir	Mercedes Barranco	Edith Valdez	Ilse McCarthy	Homero Duran	Nelly Bedolla
Yahir	Pepo Martínez	Haydee Leyva	Jonathan Lohe	Gris Sandoval	Luis Sánchez
Yahir	Iván Sosa	Jozz Edith	Rafael Carpinteyro	Daniela Mejía	Jesús Torres
Yahir	Jéssica Ríos	Víctor Villalobos	Diego Denver	Fany Rubio	Nayelli López
Yahir	Erick Zárate	Paula Vera	Ulises Orozco	Alejandra Salas	Luis Enrique Partida
Yahir	Raúl Macías	Lucía Madariaga	Danna Zamorto	Ian Vargas	Mayte de Samaniego
Yahir	Tamara				
Ricardo Montaner					
Ricardo Montaner	Mashiakh y Dara Warnero	Sury Faría	Diana Bellini	Abi Gómez	Diana Leoport
Ricardo Montaner	Elías Aguirre	José Otero	Maka	Yomi Ascasio	Euge Hernández
Ricardo Montaner	John Vince	Laura de Freitas	~~Caro Molina~~	~~Luisa Mata~~	~~Alex Guillén~~
Ricardo Montaner	Begoña Ibarreche	Luis Ángel Layseca	Chamo Perdomo	Roberto Hinostroza	Ana Luisa
Ricardo Montaner	Silvia Priego	Uriel Valenzuela	~~Jair Gentleman~~	~~Euge Hernández~~	~~Tania Gutiérrez~~
Ricardo Montaner	~~Duo One~~	~~Nelly Burguette~~	Dalia González	Fares Kassis	Carlos Morantes
Ricardo Montaner	AXL Dissa	Ximena Ocampo	Allyson Menrod	Sofía Silva	JJ
Ricardo Montaner	Ana Spíndola	Juan Colin	Jago Valentino	Brissa López	Salma
Ricardo Montaner	Ana Paula Enríquez	Juan de Flores	Jacqueline Meneses	Majo Lazo	Didi Ibarra
Ricardo Montaner	Diego Mónaco	Pedro Soto	Paz Villaseñor	Disnarda Vega	Esther González
Ricardo Montaner	Jhonny Salaz	Paola Sulser	Patricio Gala	Andrea Nuñez	Valeria Cárdenas
Ricardo Montaner	Adri de Lucía				
Note: Italicized names are stolen artists (names struck through within former teams).

== Blind Auditions ==
Color key

Coach pressed "QUIERO TU VOZ" button
Artist defaulted to a coach's team
Artist elected a coach's team
Artist eliminated with no coach pressing his or her “QUIERO TU VOZ” button

=== Episode 1 (March 12) ===
At the beginning of the episode, each coach performed a solo song: Lupillo Rivera sang "Mi Gusto Es", Yahir sang "Fue Ella, Fui Yo", Belinda sang "Luz Sin Gravedad" and Ricardo Montaner sang "La Cima del Cielo".

Order	Artist	Age	Hometown	Song	Coach's and artist's choices			
Order	Artist	Age	Hometown	Song	Lupillo	Belinda	Yahir	Ricardo
1	Ana Spíndola	29	Mexico City	"Cómo te extraño"	✔	✔	✔	✔
2	Mitzy Yamet	27	Mexico City	"Cobarde"	✔	—	✔	—
3	Adam Sadwing	32	Mexico City	"¿Cómo pagarte?"	—	—	—	—
4	Carolina Hernández	27	Mexico City	"¿Quién como tú?"	✔	—	—	—
5	Juan Carlos Casasola	54	Huixquilucan, Edo. de México	"Uno entre mil"	—	—	—	—
6	Uriel Valenzuela	23	Tepic, Nayarit	"Decirte adiós"	✔	✔	✔	✔
7	Carlos Alba	29	Aguascalientes, Aguascalientes	"Mi forma de sentir"	✔	✔	—	—
8	Alexander Hertogs	37	Netherlands	"Love Me Tender"	—	—	—	—
9	Laura Cuevas	24	Oaxaca, Oaxaca	"La Llorona"	✔	—	—	—
10	Karen Romero	22	Ecatepec, Estado de México	"Así se fue"	✔	✔	✔	—
11	Bettina y Óscar	25y26	Ciudad de México	"Hoy tengo ganas de ti"	✔	✔	✔	✔
12	Pablo Ahmad	39	Buenos Aires, Argentina	"La nave del olvido"	—	—	—	—
13	Gerson Solís	24	Costa Rica	"Le solté la rienda"	✔	—	✔	✔
14	Maka	21	Cuba	"Pillowtalk"	✔	✔	✔	✔

=== Episode 2 (March 13) ===
Order	Artist	Age	Hometown	Song	Coach's and artist's choices			
Order	Artist	Age	Hometown	Song	Lupillo	Belinda	Yahir	Ricardo
1	Tamara	19	Mexico City	"Cuídate"	✔	✔	✔	✔
2	Yael González	24	Mexico City	"Amar y querer"	✔	—	—	—
3	Paz Villaseñor	24	Guadalajara, Jalisco	"Sin ti"		—	✔	✔
4	Mitzi Hernández	22	Guadalajara, Jalisco	"El color de tus ojos"	—	—	—	—
5	Roberto Navarro	29	Mexico City	"Esta tarde vi llover"	✔	—	✔	—
6	Dalia González	28	Guadalajara, Jalisco	"Cruz de navajas"		—	—	✔
7	Tristán Ramírez	25	Mexico City	"Todo a pulmón"	—	—	—	—
8	Viviann Baeza	19	Querétaro, Querétaro	"Mi persona favorita"	✔	✔	✔	✔
9	Arath Jiménez	18	Tuxtla Gutiérrez, Chiapas	"El sinaloense	✔	✔	—	—
10	Elías Aguirre	22	Oaxtepec, Morelos	"Granada"	✔	✔	✔	✔
11	Germaine	26	State of Mexico	"Versace on the Floor"	✔	✔	✔	✔
12	Fernanda Velázquez	27	Los Mochis, Sinaloa	"Lo intentamos"	✔	—	—	—
13	Paula Allien y Perla Val	28y25	Orizaba, Veracruz / Hermosillo, Sonora	"Mala hierba"	—	—	—	—
14	Víctor Villalobos	33	Ciudad Mendoza, Veracruz	"Nada es para siempre"	✔	—	✔	✔

=== Episode 3 (March 19) ===
Order	Artist	Age	Hometown	Song	Coach's and artist's choices			
Order	Artist	Age	Hometown	Song	Lupillo	Belinda	Yahir	Ricardo
1	Rosalba Montero	27	Morelia, Michoacán	"I Want You Back"	✔	—	—	✔
2	Roberto "Ro" Blázquez	29	Ciudad de México	"True Colors"	✔	✔	✔	✔
3	José Otero	29	Gran Canaria, Spain	"Dancing On My Own"	✔	✔	✔	✔
4	Edith González	30	Guadalajara, Jalisco	"Tiempos Mejores"	—	—	—	—
5	Daniela Jiménez	19	Zapopan, Jalisco	"Que lo nuestro se quede nuestro"	—	—	—	—
6	Chamo Perdomo	39	San Cristóbal, Venezuela	"Muchachita consentida"	✔	—	—	—
7	Patricio Gala	21	Monterrey, Nuevo León	"Sexo, pudor y lágrimas"	✔	—	—	✔
8	Guillermo Proal	40	Ciudad de México	"Volcán"	—	—	—	—
9	Danna Zamorto	21	Ciudad de México	"De qué me sirve la vida"	✔	—	✔	✔
10	Rodrigo Villalba	34	Buenos Aires, Argentina	"Calma"	—	—	—	—
11	César Antulio	31	Chihuahua, Chihuahua	"Dejaría todo"	✔	—	—	—
12	Nelly Burguette	27	Ciudad de México	"Bang Bang"	✔	✔	✔	✔
13	Luis Ángel	28	Torreón, Coahuila	"La media vuelta"	—	—	—	—
14	Diana Leoport	21	Ciudad de México	"At Last"	✔	✔	✔	✔

=== Episode 24 (May 20) ===
Order	Artist	Age	Hometown	Song	Coach's and artist's choices			
Order	Artist	Age	Hometown	Song	Lupillo	Belinda	Yahir	Ricardo
1	Tania Gutiérrez	29	Nogales, Sonora	"Casi perfecto"	✔	✔	✔	✔
2	Robie Rojas	31	Valencia, Venezuela	"Bésame mucho"	✔	—	—	—
3	Javier Roal	29	Ciudad de México	"Maldita luna"	—	—	—	—
4	Cecilia Villalba	23	Tijuana, Baja California	"Can't Help Falling in Love"	✔	✔	✔	✔
5	Maia San Miguel	26	Ciudad de México	"Piensa en mí"	—	—	—	—
6	Erik y Sonia "Duo One"	29y32	Durango, Durango	"Colgando en tus manos"	✔	✔	—	✔
7	Paula Vera	43	Mexico City / Chile	"I'll Never Fall in Love Again"	—	—	✔	—
8	Rodrigo Alejo	27	Querétaro, Querétaro	"Tu cabeza en mi hombro"	—	✔	Team full	✔
9	Riccy	17	Querétaro, Querétaro	" A labio dulce"	—	—	Team full	—
10	Gaby Luna	26	Durango, Durango	"Un mundo raro"	✔	✔	Team full	—
11	Julie Fernández	18	Naucalpan, Edo. de México	"Espacio sideral"	Team full	—	Team full	—
12	Juan Colin	41	El Rosario, Sinaloa	"Por mujeres como tú"	Team full	✔	Team full	✔
13	Fernanda Rodríguez	25	Mexico City / Costa Rica	"Valiente"	Team full	✔	Team full	Team full

== The Battles ==
The Battle Round started June 5. The coaches can steal two losing artists from other coaches. Contestants who win their battle or are stolen by another coach will advance to the Top 3 Round.

Color key:

Artist won the Battle and advanced to the Top 3
Artist lost the Battle but was stolen by another coach
Artist lost the Battle and was eliminated

Episode	Coach	Order	Winner	Song	Loser	'Steal' result			
Episode	Coach	Order	Winner	Song	Loser	Lupillo	Belinda	Yahir	Ricardo
Episode 32 (Wednesday, June 5, 2019)	Ricardo Montaner	1	Laura de Freitas	"I Have Nothing"	Caro Molina	—	—	✔	N/A
Episode 32 (Wednesday, June 5, 2019)	Yahir	2	Tenoch Niño de Rivera	"Come Fly with Me"	Roberto Navarro	—	—	N/A	—
Episode 32 (Wednesday, June 5, 2019)	Belinda	3	Dave Shaman	"Iris"	Alecs Baéz	—	N/A	—	—
Episode 32 (Wednesday, June 5, 2019)	Lupillo Rivera	4	Mario Heredia	"Perro fiel"	Majo	N/A	—	—	—
Episode 32 (Wednesday, June 5, 2019)	Yahir	5	Alexander Juli	"Te Vi"	Duzan	—	—	N/A	—
Episode 32 (Wednesday, June 5, 2019)	Belinda	6	Viviann Baeza	"Duele"	Lalo Arriola	✔	—	N/A	—
Episode 32 (Wednesday, June 5, 2019)	Lupillo Rivera	7	José de Jesús "Pichi"	"Si tú te vas"	Gaby Luna	N/A	—	—	—
Episode 32 (Wednesday, June 5, 2019)	Ricardo Montaner	8	José Otero	"Llegaste tú"	Begoña Ibarreche	—	—	—	N/A
Episode 33 (Monday, June 10, 2019)	Lupillo Rivera	1	Pame Larré	"La bruja"	Tania Gutiérrez	N/A	—	—	—
Episode 33 (Monday, June 10, 2019)	Yahir	2	Leo Rosas	"Ya no vives en mí"	Nelly Burguette	—	—	N/A	—
Episode 33 (Monday, June 10, 2019)	Belinda	3	Rodrigo Decuir	"La malquerida"	Duo One	—	N/A	—	—
Episode 33 (Monday, June 10, 2019)	Ricardo Montaner	4	Diana Bellini	"Recuerdo"	Luisa Mata	✔	✔	✔	N/A
Episode 33 (Monday, June 10, 2019)	Lupillo Rivera	5	Diana Díaz	"No te contaron mal"	Alan Ponce	N/A	–	–	–
Episode 33 (Monday, June 10, 2019)	Yahir	6	Omar Pérez	"Te quiero, te quiero"	Omar Sago	—	—	N/A	—
Episode 33 (Monday, June 10, 2019)	Belinda	7	Meli G	"Uptown Funk"	Germaine		N/A		—
Episode 33 (Monday, June 10, 2019)	Ricardo Montaner	8	Diana Leoport	"Halo"	Luis Ángel Layseca	–	–	Team full	N/A
Episode 34 (Tuesday, June 11, 2019)	Belinda	1	Keyla Lencioni	"Échame la culpa"	Alan Jos	—	N/A	Team Full	—
Episode 34 (Tuesday, June 11, 2019)	Lupillo Rivera	2	Miguel Rivera	"Solos"	Ana Loaiza	—	—	Team Full	N/D
Episode 34 (Tuesday, June 11, 2019)	Ricardo Montaner	3	Elías Aguirre	"El triste"	Roberto Hinostroza	N/D	—	Team Full	—
Episode 34 (Tuesday, June 11, 2019)	Yahir	4	Arantza Hernández	"Say Something"	Jair Gentleman	—	—	Team Full	—
Episode 34 (Tuesday, June 11, 2019)	Lupillo Rivera	5	Irasema	"Lost on You"	Yomi Ascasio	N/A	–	Team Full	✔
Episode 34 (Tuesday, June 11, 2019)	Ricardo Montaner	6	Mashiakh y Dara	"I Will Always Love You"	Chamo Perdomo	—	–	Team Full	N/A
Episode 34 (Tuesday, June 11, 2019)	Belinda	7	Rodo González	"De los besos que te di"	Euge Hernández	–	N/A	Team Full	✔
Episode 34 (Tuesday, June 11, 2019)	Yahir	8	T-Love	"Si voy a perderte"	Edna Martín	—	—	Team Full	N/A
Episode 35 (Wednesday, June 12, 2019)	Yahir	1	Guillermo Salazar	"Qué gano olvidándote"	Joey Benjamin	–	–	Team full	Team full
Episode 35 (Wednesday, June 12, 2019)	Ricardo Montaner	2	Abi Gómez	"La gata bajo la lluvia"	Silvia Priego	—	—	Team full	Team full
Episode 35 (Wednesday, June 12, 2019)	Lupillo Rivera	3	Fátima Domínguez	"A cambio de qué"	Diana Laura Domínguez	N/A	–	Team full	Team full
Episode 35 (Wednesday, June 12, 2019)	Belinda	4	Majo Alcocer	"Perfect"	Steven Sibaja	—	N/A	Team full	Team full
Episode 35 (Wednesday, June 12, 2019)	Yahir	5	Bettina y Oscar	"Héroe"	Nicole García	—	—	Team full	Team full
Episode 35 (Wednesday, June 12, 2019)	Lupillo Rivera	6	Yael González	"Quién"	Diana Mellado	N/A	–	Team full	Team full
Episode 35 (Wednesday, June 12, 2019)	Belinda	7	Lucas Martín	"It's a Man's World"	Eli Zamora	✔	N/A	Team full	Team full
Episode 35 (Wednesday, June 12, 2019)	Ricardo Montaner	8	Sury Faría	"Entrégate"	Ana Luisa	–	–	Team full	Team full
Episode 36 (Monday, June 17, 2019)	Lupillo Rivera	1	Rose Merlin	"La cosa más bella"	Axxl Mart	Team full	–	Team full	Team full
Episode 36 (Monday, June 17, 2019)	Belinda	2	Carlos Alba	"Recuérdame"	Ilayali Bolívar	Team full	N/A	Team full	Team full
Episode 36 (Monday, June 17, 2019)	Yahir	3	Mitzy Yamet	"Try a little tenderness"	Jimena Segovia	Team full	—	Team full	Team full
Episode 36 (Monday, June 17, 2019)	Ricardo Montaner	4	Maka	"Shallow"	Uriel Valenzuela	Team full	—	Team full	Team full
Episode 36 (Monday, June 17, 2019)	Belinda	5	Zuhe Riestra	"Mi persona favorita"	Max Barragán	Team full	N/A	Team full	Team full
Episode 36 (Monday, June 17, 2019)	Yahir	6	Daniela González	"Hábito de ti"	Karen Romero	Team full	—	Team full	Team full
Episode 36 (Monday, June 17, 2019)	Ricardo Montaner	7	John Vince	"Lay me down"	Alex Guillén	Team full	✔	Team full	Team full
Episode 36 (Monday, June 17, 2019)	Lupillo Rivera	8	Karoll Flores	"Tan solo tú"	Carlos Rubén Loaiza	Team full	Team full	Team full	Team full

== Top 3 ==
The Top 3 Round started on June 18, and consisted of three episodes. During this round each coach chooses their best three artists of their choice to advance to the live shows. After each individual performance, it is up to their coach if the artist deserves one of the three chairs. If they do, artist on Chair #3 is eliminated in favor of the new artist. If their coach decides not to give a chair they are automatically eliminated. The 3 artists (per team) that remain in a chair until the end of this round will advance to the Quarterfinals.

Color key

Artist received a chair from his/her coach
Artist did not receive a chair from his/her coach
Artist was eliminated without chair given
Artist was eliminated after chair was given to someone else
Artists remained in a chair and advanced to the Quarterfinals

Episode	Coach	Order	Artist	Song	Chair	Artist Removed	Final Result
Episode 37 (Tuesday, June 18, 2019)	Ricardo Montaner	1	Laura de Freitas	"Sola otra vez"		–	Eliminated
Episode 37 (Tuesday, June 18, 2019)	Ricardo Montaner	2	John Vince	"No puedo dejarte de amar"		–	Eliminated
Episode 37 (Tuesday, June 18, 2019)	Ricardo Montaner	3	Elías Aguirre	"Never Enough"		–	Eliminated
Episode 37 (Tuesday, June 18, 2019)	Ricardo Montaner	4	Diana Bellini	"My Heart Will Go On"		Laura de Freitas	Advanced
Episode 37 (Tuesday, June 18, 2019)	Lupillo Rivera	5	Diana Díaz	"Cielo rojo"		–	Eliminated
Episode 37 (Tuesday, June 18, 2019)	Lupillo Rivera	6	Yael González	"Oro de ley"		–	Eliminated
Episode 37 (Tuesday, June 18, 2019)	Lupillo Rivera	7	Karoll Flores	"Ex's & Oh's"		–	Eliminated
Episode 37 (Tuesday, June 18, 2019)	Lupillo Rivera	8	Eli Zamora	"Regresa a mí"		–	Eliminated
Episode 37 (Tuesday, June 18, 2019)	Belinda	9	Rodo González	"Imposible"		–	Eliminated
Episode 37 (Tuesday, June 18, 2019)	Belinda	10	Zuhe Riestra	"Algo contigo"		–	Eliminated
Episode 37 (Tuesday, June 18, 2019)	Belinda	11	Luisa Mata	"Un sueño que una vez soñe"		–	Eliminated
Episode 37 (Tuesday, June 18, 2019)	Belinda	12	Majo Alcocer	"Home"		Rodo González	Eliminated
Episode 37 (Tuesday, June 18, 2019)	Yahir	13	Mitzy Yamet	"Tormento"		–	Eliminated
Episode 37 (Tuesday, June 18, 2019)	Yahir	14	Tenoch Niño de Rivera	"Back to Black"		–	Advanced
Episode 37 (Tuesday, June 18, 2019)	Yahir	15	Caro Molina	"A esa mujer"		–	Eliminated
Episode 37 (Tuesday, June 18, 2019)	Yahir	16	Bettina y Óscar	"Vivo por ella"		–	Eliminated
Episode 38 (Wednesday, June 19, 2019)	Ricardo Montaner	1	Maka	"Rehab"		–	Eliminated
Episode 38 (Wednesday, June 19, 2019)	Ricardo Montaner	2	Yomi Ascasio	"Algo de mí"		–	Eliminated
Episode 38 (Wednesday, June 19, 2019)	Ricardo Montaner	3	Euge Hernández	"Yo te voy a amar"		–	Eliminated
Episode 38 (Wednesday, June 19, 2019)	Ricardo Montaner	4	Mashiakh y Dara Warnero	"Like I'm Gonna Lose You"		John Vince	Advanced
Episode 38 (Wednesday, June 19, 2019)	Lupillo Rivera	5	Lalo Arriola	"Ya es muy tarde"		–	Eliminated
Episode 38 (Wednesday, June 19, 2019)	Lupillo Rivera	6	Rose Merlin	"Ahora quién"		Diana Díaz	Eliminated
Episode 38 (Wednesday, June 19, 2019)	Lupillo Rivera	7	Mario Heredia	"Corazón"		Karoll Flores	Eliminated
Episode 38 (Wednesday, June 19, 2019)	Lupillo Rivera	8	Pame Larré	"Tears in Heaven"		Yael González	Eliminated
Episode 38 (Wednesday, June 19, 2019)	Belinda	9	Alex Guillén	"Tardes negras"		–	Eliminated
Episode 38 (Wednesday, June 19, 2019)	Belinda	10	Keyla Lencioni	"Mañana es too late"		–	Eliminated
Episode 38 (Wednesday, June 19, 2019)	Belinda	11	Carlos Alba	"La Malagueña"		Luisa Mata	Eliminated
Episode 38 (Wednesday, June 19, 2019)	Belinda	12	Dave Shaman	"Still Loving You"		Zuhe Riestra	Eliminated
Episode 38 (Wednesday, June 19, 2019)	Yahir	13	Germaine	"Love on Top"		–	Eliminated
Episode 38 (Wednesday, June 19, 2019)	Yahir	14	T-Love	"La chica de Ipanema"		Caro Molina	Eliminated
Episode 38 (Wednesday, June 19, 2019)	Yahir	15	Alexander Juli	"Disparo al corazón"		Mitzy Yamet	Eliminated
Episode 38 (Wednesday, June 19, 2019)	Yahir	16	Arantza Hernández	"Por siempre tú"		–	Eliminated
Episodio 39 (Monday, June 24, 2019)	Ricardo Montaner	1	Abi Gómez	"Me va a extrañar"		–	Eliminated
Episodio 39 (Monday, June 24, 2019)	Ricardo Montaner	2	Diana Leoport	"L-O-V-E"		–	Eliminated
Episodio 39 (Monday, June 24, 2019)	Ricardo Montaner	3	Sury Faria	"Respect"		Elías Aguirre	Advanced
Episodio 39 (Monday, June 24, 2019)	Ricardo Montaner	4	José Otero	"Te esperaba"		–	Eliminated
Episodio 39 (Monday, June 24, 2019)	Lupillo Rivera	5	Miguel Rivera	"Esclavo y amo"		Rose Merlin	Advanced
Episodio 39 (Monday, June 24, 2019)	Lupillo Rivera	6	Fátima Domínguez	"Feeling Good"		Mario Heredia	Advanced
Episodio 39 (Monday, June 24, 2019)	Lupillo Rivera	7	Irasema	"Fallaste corazón"		Pame Larré	Eliminated
Episodio 39 (Monday, June 24, 2019)	Lupillo Rivera	8	José de Jesús "Pichi"	"Dónde estará mi primavera"		Irasema	Advanced
Episodio 39 (Monday, June 24, 2019)	Belinda	9	Meli G	"A Million Dreams"		–	Advanced
Episodio 39 (Monday, June 24, 2019)	Belinda	10	Rodrigo Decuir	"Me arrepiento"		–	Eliminated
Episodio 39 (Monday, June 24, 2019)	Belinda	11	Viviann Baeza	"Open Arms"		Dave Shaman	Advanced
Episodio 39 (Monday, June 24, 2019)	Belinda	12	Lucas Martín	"When a Man Loves a Woman"		Carlos Alba	Advanced
Episodio 39 (Monday, June 24, 2019)	Yahir	13	Leo Rosas	"Todo se derrumbó"		T-Love	Advanced
Episodio 39 (Monday, June 24, 2019)	Yahir	14	Guillermo Salazar	"Corazón en la maleta"		–	Eliminated
Episodio 39 (Monday, June 24, 2019)	Yahir	15	Daniela González	"No sé vivir si no es contigo"		Alexander Juli	Advanced
Episodio 39 (Monday, June 24, 2019)	Yahir	16	Omar Pérez	"Always"		–	Eliminated

Non-competition performances
Order	Artist	Song
37.1	Ricardo Montaner	"Qué vas a hacer ahora"
38.1	Lupillo Rivera	"A través del vaso"
39.1	Belinda y Yahir	"Alucinado"

== Live Shows ==
Color key:

Artist was saved by the Public's votes
Artist was eliminated

=== Week 1, Day 1: Quarterfinals (June 25) ===
Order	Coach	Artist	Song	Result
1	Lupillo Rivera	Miguel Rivera	"Hay Amores"	Eliminated
2	Yahir	Daniela González	"Dangerous Woman"	Eliminated
3	Ricardo Montaner	Sury Faría	"Oye"	Safe
4	Belinda	Viviann Baeza	"Your Song"	Safe
5	Lupillo Rivera	José de Jesús "Pïchi"	"Cómo sufro"	Safe
6	Yahir	Leo Rosas	"Melodía desencadenada"	Safe
7	Ricardo Montaner	Mashiakh y Dara Warnero	"Un mundo ideal"	Safe
8	Belinda	Lucas Martin	"You Are So Beautiful"	Safe
9	Lupillo Rivera	Fátima Domínguez	"I'll Never Love Again"	Safe
10	Yahir	Tenoch Niño de Rivera	"Unchain My Heart"	Safe
11	Ricardo Montaner	Diana Bellini	"Gracias a la vida"	Eliminated
12	Belinda	Meli G	"Havana"	Eliminated

Non-competition performances
Order	Artist	Song
1	Lupillo Rivera	"A mi manera"
2	Ricardo Montaner	"Me va a extrañar"
3	Belinda	"Nada"

=== Week 1, Day 2: Semifinal (June 26) ===
Order	Coach	Artist	Song	Result
1	Yahir	Tenoch Niño de Rivera	"Mackie El Navaja"	Eliminated
2	Lupillo Rivera	José de Jesús "Pichi"	"Urge"	Eliminated
3	Belinda	Lucas Martín	"Earned It"	Eliminated
4	Ricardo Montaner	Mashiakh y Dara Warnero	"La Gloria de Dios"	Safe
5	Yahir	Leo Rosas	"Tu primera vez"	Safe
6	Lupillo Rivera	Fátima Domínguez	"Alone"	Safe
7	Belinda	Viviann Baeza	"El hombre del piano"	Safe
8	Ricardo Montaner	Sury Faría	"Mi todo"	Eliminated

Non-competition performances
Order	Artist	Song
1	Romeo Santos y Raulín Rodríguez	"La Demanda"
2	Belinda	"Como Quien Pierde Una Estrella"
3	Yahir	"Entre nosotros dos"
4	Belinda y Ricardo Montaner	"El Poder De Tu Amor"

=== Week 2: Live Finale (July 1) ===
The finale aired July 1, 2019 with the Top 4 artists. All artists performed one solo song and one song alongside their coach. After, the host announced the fourth and third place. The two remainining artists performed a song they've sang during the show with the public's vote being announced at the end of the night. Fátima Domínguez was crowned the winner of the season.

Color key:

Winner
Runner-up
3rd Place
4th Place

Coach	Artist	Order	Solo Song	Order	Duet (With Coach)	Order	Solo Song	Result
Belinda	Viviann Baeza	1	"Caruso"	4	"Contigo en la Distancia"	N/A	N/A (Eliminated)	3rd Place
Yahir	Leo Rosas	5	"Volver a amar"	2	"La Locura"	10	"Amiga Mía"	Runner-up
Lupillo Rivera	Fátima Domínguez	3	"Skyfall"	7	"Acá entre nos"	9	"The Power of Love"	Winner
Ricardo Montaner	Mashiakh y Dara Warnero	8	"No Me Doy por Vencido"	6	"Déjame llorar"	N/A	N/A (Eliminated)	4th Place

Actuaciones fuera de competencia
Orden	Artista	Canción
1	Mau y Ricky	"Ya no tiene Novio/ Desconocidos"
2	Ricardo Montaner y Yahir	"Tan Enamorados"
3	Belinda y Lupillo Rivera	"Amor de los dos"

== Elimination Chart ==
=== Overall ===
Color key
Artist's info

- Team Lupillo
- Team Belinda
- Team Yahir
- Team Montaner

Result details

- Winner
- Runner-up
- Third place
- Fourth place
- Saved by the public
- Eliminated

Live Show Results per week
Artists	Week 1, Day 1	Week 1, Day 2	Week 2 Finale
Fátima Domínguez	Safe	Safe	Winner
Leo Rosas	Safe	Safe	Runner-up
Viviann Baeza	Safe	Safe	3rd place
Mashiak & Dara Warnero	Safe	Safe	4th place
José de Jesús	Safe	Eliminated	Eliminated (week 1, day 2)
Lucas Martín	Safe	Eliminated	Eliminated (week 1, day 2)
Sury Faría	Safe	Eliminated	Eliminated (week 1, day 2)
Tenoch Niño de Rivera	Safe	Eliminated	Eliminated (week 1, day 2)
Daniela González	Eliminated	Eliminated (week 1, day 1)	
Diana Bellini	Eliminated	Eliminated (week 1, day 1)	
Meli G	Eliminated	Eliminated (week 1, day 1)	
Miguel Rivera	Eliminated	Eliminated (week 1, day 1)	
