= La Voz (Mexican TV series) season 9 =

La Voz
- Season 9
- Hosted by: Eddy Vilard; Sofía Aragón
- Coaches: Ricardo Montaner; Belinda; María José; Christian Nodal
- Winner: Fernando Sujo
- Winning coach: Christian Nodal
- Runner-up: Alexis Tanguma

Release
- Original network: Azteca Uno
- Original release: June 2 – August 31, 2020

Season chronology
- ← Previous; Season 8 Next → Season 10

The ninth season of La Voz premiered on June 2, 2020, on Azteca Uno. Ricardo Montaner and Belinda returned as coaches for their second season, while María José and Christian Nodal joined the panel, replacing Yahir and Lupillo Rivera. Jimena Pérez, the host from the previous season, was replaced by Eddy Vilard and Sofía Aragón.

Originally scheduled for March 30, 2020, the season was postponed due to the COVID-19 pandemic. TV Azteca announced that the show was postponed until further notice to protect everyone's health. It was later announced that the new date would be June 2.

The block button returned for this season, allowing coaches to prevent another coach from selecting an artist they like. Each coach had two block opportunities during the blind auditions. This feature was first introduced in the seventh season produced by Televisa.

On Monday, August 31, 2020, Fernando Sujo was announced as the winner and crowned La Voz México 2020, along with his coach Christian Nodal. Nodal's win also makes him the youngest winning coach in the entire history of The Voice franchise.

== Coaches ==
La Voz México season 9 coaches

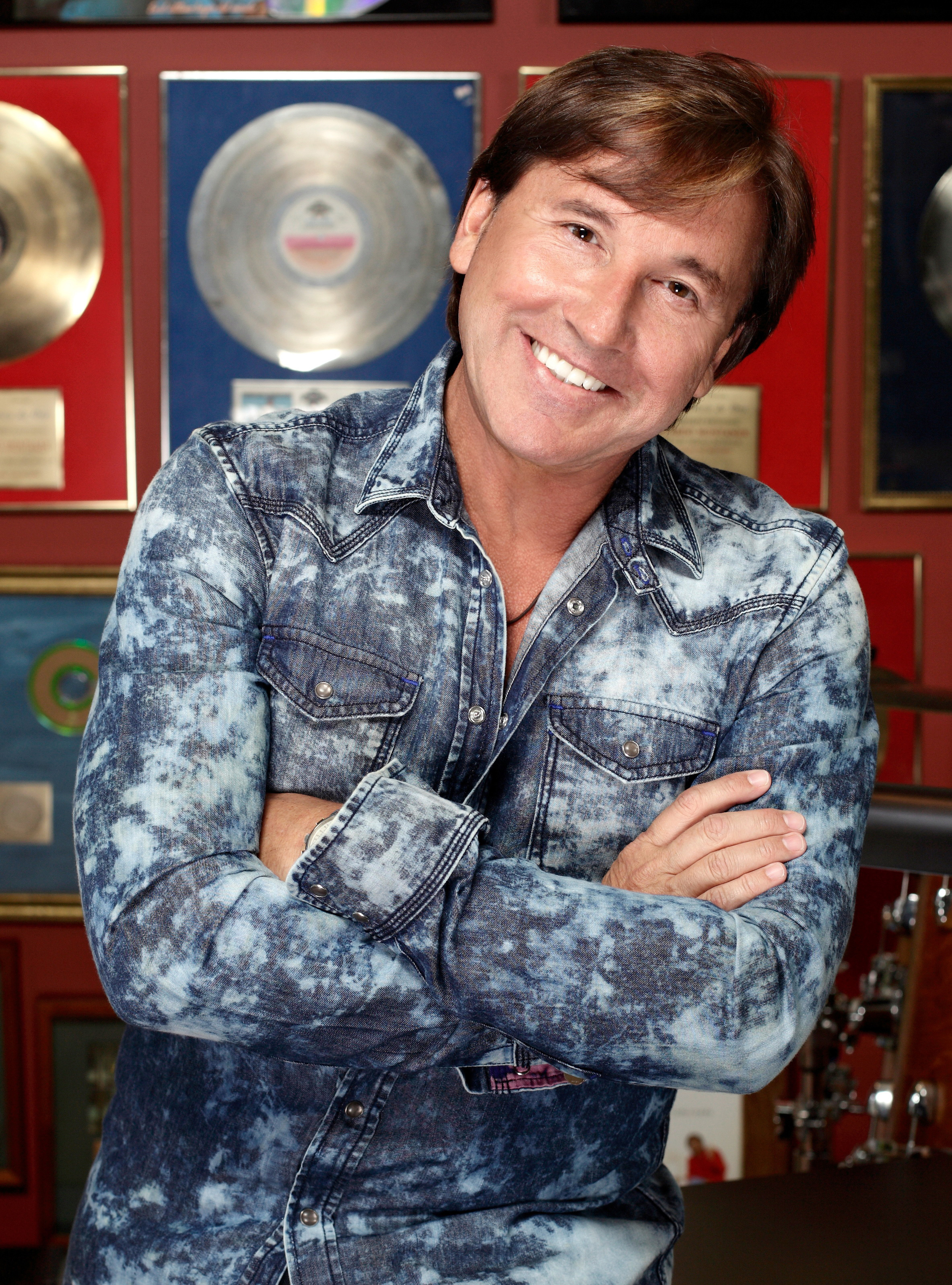
Ricardo Montaner

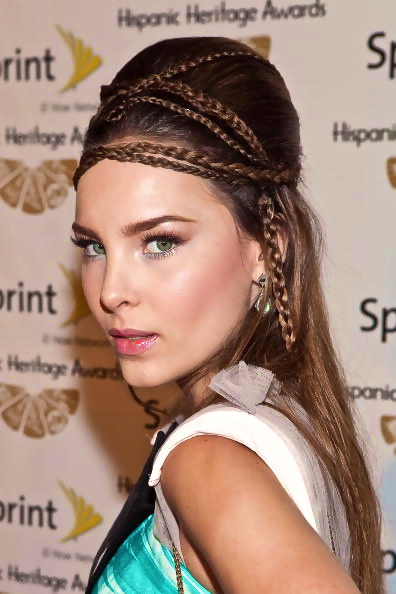
Belinda

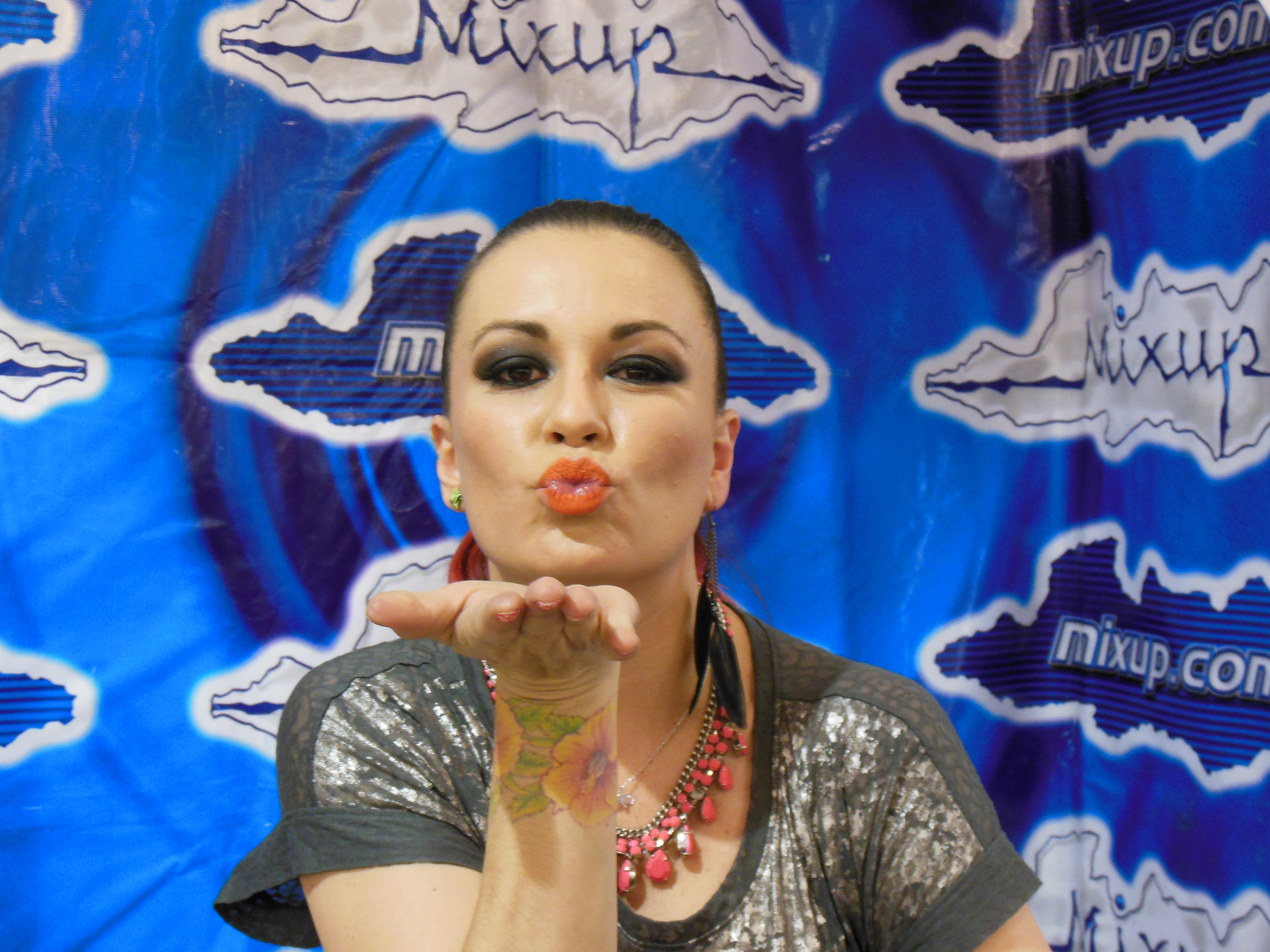
María José

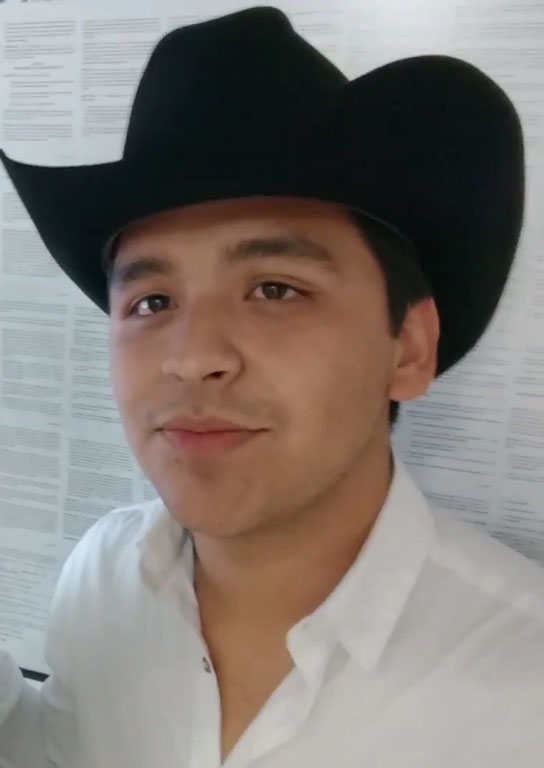
Christian Nodal

On January 21, 2020, TV Azteca officially confirmed the return of Ricardo Montaner and Belinda as coaches for their second season, along with new coaches María José and Christian Nodal. Nodal's inclusion as a coach made him the youngest coach in the history of The Voice franchise, surpassing Tini Stoessel from La Voz Argentina.

Similar to the previous season, there were no advisors present for either the Knockout or Battle Rounds. This continued the trend of not having advisors for those rounds.

== Teams ==
Color key

Winner
Runner-up
Third place
Fourth place
Eliminated in the Final Phase
Eliminated in the Top 3
Stolen in the Battles
Eliminated in the Battles
Stolen in the Knockouts
Eliminated in the Knockouts
Withdrew

Coaches	Top 168 artists					
Ricardo Montaner						
Ricardo Montaner	Alexis Tanguma	Alonso Hernández	Gabby Muller	Pao Carrasco	Las Conde	Adria & Lluvia Acuña
Ricardo Montaner	Sofía Guardiola	Mila Gaos	Jorge Quintero	Laura Argelia	~~Anabel Paz~~	~~Glenda Ramírez~~
Ricardo Montaner	~~Daniela Cortés~~	~~Emilio Cámara~~	Montserrat Cruz	Daniela & Fuensanta	Sergio Aquino	Fabiola Jaramillo
Ricardo Montaner	~~Mario Cruz~~	~~Bigi~~	~~Kike Jiménez~~	Jorge Cano	Aura	Carla Cerda
Ricardo Montaner	Dan y Rigo	Miriam Mar	Karina Esparza	Liz Flores	Tiffany	Jessica Luna
Ricardo Montaner	Alejandra De Garay	Marilú Juárez	Juan Luis Orozco	Anny Lynno Montes	Eddy Peña	Vivozes
Ricardo Montaner	Mon Franco	Luis Daniel Herca	Antonio Ramírez	Ari Benedick	Tony Rosher	Maximo Franco
Ricardo Montaner	Alejandra Iglesias	Gaby Teijo	Las Pereira	Galván		
Belinda						
Belinda	Prudence	Juan Ma	DYF	Karely Esparza	Mario de la Garza	Mercedes de Angoitia
Belinda	Scarlett Chico	Jossué González	Yuli Flores	Quetzaly	~~Gabby Muller~~	Mario Cruz
Belinda	Grace Guillen	Ángel Strife	Marlene Lechuga	Karen Ricoy	Nicholas Griffin	Karen de la Puente
Belinda	~~Daniela & Fuensanta~~	Abdiel Roses	Brian Álvarez	Alex Rey	Cheyenne	Diana Delgado
Belinda	Andresse	Mauricio Vaez	Daniela Pedali	MyMy	Frida Piña	Joanna Valencia
Belinda	Quique Montes	Alejandro HG	Vanessa Payán	Mary Ángel	Marah	Lendor
Belinda	Abner Medina	Heriberto Jiménez	Jonathan Sandoval	Vicky Cabrera	Dafne Celada	Yahel Gozz
Belinda	Rafael Castañón	Rodolfo Padilla	Owen Padua	Ricardo Ramírez		
María José						
María José	Glenda Ramírez	Majo Cornejo	Kike Jiménez	Pedro Herrera	Irlanda González	Betty Love
María José	Fer Haneine	Tomás Mándel	Any Banda	Anabel Paz	~~Quetzaly~~	~~Sofía Guardiola~~
María José	Laura Ruíz	Alex Shaar	Grettel	Mar Puente	Scarlett Ceballos	Karyna Rizos
María José	~~Sandy Castillo~~	~~Pao Carrasco~~	Luhana Riveros	Keyra Valay	Felo	Yanina
María José	Pedro Massucatti	Hugo Robles	Mint Parker	Alinka	Primavera Alejandre	César Kafka
María José	Las Jimez	Guily Baraldi	Rodriguez	Genaro Perlo	Yill	Shinobi Ortiz
María José	Yari Pimentel	Felipe Álvarez	Gerardo Urquiza	Ricardo Larrazolo	Álvaro Velsan	Josafat e Imanol
María José	Sara Aimeé	Little Coco	Karely Gómez	Irma Flores		
Christian Nodal						
Christian Nodal	Fernando Sujo	Natalia Marrokin	Arnoldo Tapia	Marìa Renée	Kelly Castro	Sara Rubí
Christian Nodal	Emilio Cámara	Alex Sevilla	Daniela Cortés	Nieves Loaiza	~~Yuli Flores~~	Sandy Castillo
Christian Nodal	Kaii Jiménez	Pamela Maldonado	Abel González	HERSAH	Bigi	Gemelas Nevares
Christian Nodal	~~Marlene Lechuga~~	~~Mar Puente~~	Rodrigo Mena	Sandra Padilla	Alondra & Paola	Sofía Schellemberg
Christian Nodal	Carol Ziehl	Andrés Ayong	Memo Blues	Nandy Cupil	Juan Jesús Martínez	Cuates Berumen
Christian Nodal	Karla Kobach	Anilú Davila	León	Omar Contreras	Stefany Torres	Montse Bernal
Christian Nodal	Héctor Castillo	Víctor González	Lalo Fuentes	Alejandro Fuentes	Leslie Palma	Manuel Medina
Christian Nodal	Azul Aimé	Nere Barajas	Reyes	Iván Cortes		
Note: Italicized names are stolen artists (names struck through within former teams).

== Blind Auditions ==
In the Blind Auditions, each coach had to complete their teams with 42 contestants. Each coach had two Blocks to prevent one of the other coaches from getting a contestant.

Color key

✔	Coach pressed "QUIERO TU VOZ" button
	Artist defaulted to a coach's team
	Artist elected a coach's team
	Artist was eliminated with no coach pressing his or her "QUIERO TU VOZ" button
✘	Coach pressed the "QUIERO TU VOZ" button, but was blocked by Ricardo from getting the artist
✘	Coach pressed the "QUIERO TU VOZ" button, but was blocked by Belinda from getting the artist
✘	Coach pressed the "QUIERO TU VOZ" button, but was blocked by María from getting the artist
✘	Coach pressed the "QUIERO TU VOZ" button, but was blocked by Nodal from getting the artist

=== Episode 1 (June 2) ===
The coaches performed "Feeling Good" at the beginning of the episode.

Order	Artist	Age	Hometown	Song	Coach's and artist's choices			
Order	Artist	Age	Hometown	Song	Ricardo	Belinda	María José	Christian
1	Glenda Ramírez	24	Ciudad Victoria, Tamaulipas	"Solo Otra Vez"	✔	✔	✔	✔
2	Claudia Cifuentes	44	Mexico City	"Sentimientos"	–	–	–	–
3	Fer Haneine	32	Mexico City	"Bohemian Rhapsody"	✔	✘	✔	–
4	Noe Alonso Paxtor	28	Chiapas, Chiapas	"Ayer te Perdí"	–	–	–	–
5	Yuli Flores	24	Monterrey, Nuevo León	"No La Beses"	–	✔	–	✔
6	Ángel Moré	25	Mexico City	"Burning Love"	–	–	–	–
7	Bigi	23	Puerto Vallarta, Jalisco	"Tusa"	✔	✔	–	✔
8	D. Khilla	–	Mexico City	"Te vi"	–	–	–	–
9	Jorge Quintero	24	Tingüindín, Michoacán	"Culpable Tù"	✔	✔	–	–
10	Carol Ziehl	17	Mexico City	"Try"	–	–	–	✔
11	DYF	–	Mexico City / China / Haiti	"Será Que No me Amas" / "Crazy"	✔	✔	✔	✔
12	Giuly Baraldi	22	Mexico City	"Valiente"	–	–	✔	–
13	Helen Kahuachi	42	Mexico City	"Mujer"	–	–	–	–
14	Mint Parker	39	Mexico City	"Highway to Hell"	–	✔	✔	✔

=== Episode 2 (June 3) ===
During the episode, Christian Nodal performed "Adiós Amor".

Order	Artist	Age	Hometown	Song	Coach's and artist's choices			
Order	Artist	Age	Hometown	Song	Ricardo	Belinda	María José	Christian
1	Luhana Riveros	41	Mexico City	"Que Locura Enamoradme de Ti"	–	–	✔	–
2	Alberto Cuevas	30	Guadalajara, Jalisco	"Ataúd"	–	–	–	–
3	Alison G	21	Veracruz, Veracruz	"Rómpeme, Matáme"	–	–	–	–
4	Felo	30	Mexico City	"Lay Me Down"	–	✔	✔	–
5	Dan y Rigo	25 & 30	Mexico City	"Reggaetón Lento (Bailemos)"	✔	–	–	–
6	Karen De La Puente	28	Mexico City	"It's Oh So Quiet"	✔	✔	✔	✔
7	Mario Cruz	21	Mexico City	"As Long as You Love Me"	✔	✔	–	–
8	Nicholas Griffin	39	Monterrey, Nuevo León	"Old Town Road"	–	✔	✔	✔
9	Jacobo Davis	27	Loreto, Baja California Sur	"Por Si No Recuerdas"	–	–	–	–
10	Laura Ruiz	26	Chihuahua, Chihuahua	"Empiezo a recordarte"	–	–	✔	–
11	Kelly Castro	19	Reynosa, Tamaulipas	"Bad Guy"	✔	✔	✘	✔
12	Areli Bautista	26	Matlapa, San Luis Potosí	"Solamente Una Vez"	–	–	–	–
13	Lalo Fuentes	44	Ciudad Victoria, Tamaulipas	"Fuerte No Soy"	–	–	–	✔

=== Episode 3 (June 8) ===
During the episode, María José performed "Adelante Corazón".

Order	Artist	Age	Hometown	Song	Coach's and artist's choices			
Order	Artist	Age	Hometown	Song	Ricardo	Belinda	María José	Christian
1	Anilú Davila	23	Torreón, Coahuila	"La Gata Bajo La Lluvia"	✔	–	–	✔
2	Pablo Dazán	28	Mexico City	"Dancing with a Stranger"	–	–	–	–
3	Reyes	30	Los Mochis, Sinaloa	"Caballero"	–	–	–	✔
4	Little Coco	36	Mexico City	"Diamonds"	✔	–	✔	–
5	Luis Arambula	21	Mexico City	"Borró Cassette"	–	–	–	–
6	Lluvia & Adria Acuña	17 & 18	Guaymas, Sonora	"Price Tag"	✔	✔	✔	✔
7	Marlene Lechuga	29	Durango, Durango	"Talking to the Moon"	✔	–	–	✔
8	Michael Miglolio	30	Ciudad Madero, Tamaulipas	"¿Quien Será?"	–	–	–	–
9	Karyna Rizos	31	Puerto Vallarta, Jalisco	"Don't Rain on My Parade"	–	–	✔	–
10	Ángel Strife	26	Mexico City	"Soñé"	–	✔	✔	✔
11	Alejandra Solis	24	Pachuca, Hidalgo	"Convénceme"	–	–	–	–
12	Mary Ángel	41	Mexico City	"Déjame Volver Contigo"	–	✔	–	–
13	Quetzaly	22	Cuernavaca, Morelos	"Yo Quería"	✔	✔	✔	✔

=== Episode 4 (June 9) ===
During the episode, Belinda performed "Bella Traición".

Order	Artist	Age	Hometown	Song	Coach's and artist's choices			
Order	Artist	Age	Hometown	Song	Ricardo	Belinda	María José	Christian
1	HERSAH	20 & 20	Tampico, Tamaulipas	"Don't Go Breaking My Heart"	✔	✔	–	✔
2	Sonia Ramirez	46	Mexico City	"Algo de mí"	–	–	–	–
3	Rafael Nava	34	Toluca, Mexico State	"Y Te Vas"	–	–	–	–
4	Vivozes	–	Mexico City	"Eres tú"	✔	–	✔	–
5	Tomás Mándel	29	Mexico City	"Versace on the Floor"	✔	✔	✔	✔
6	Memo Blues	44	Mexico City	"Yo Me Enamore de Tí"	–	–	–	✔
7	Madelein Josahandy	25	Mexico City	"Man! I Feel Like a Woman!"	–	–	–	–
8	León	21	Puebla, Puebla	"Bombón de Azucár"	–	✔	–	✔
9	Heidy Infante	41	Mexico City	"La Llamada"	–	–	–	–
10	Yari Pimentel	34	Mexico City	"Oye"	–	–	✔	–
11	Jean Pierre	26	Caracas, Venezuela	"Sentirme Vivo"	–	–	–	–
12	Scarlett Chico	23	Mexico City	"Flashlight"	✔	✔	✔	✔
13	Carla Cerda	32	Mexico City	"Because of You"	✔	–	–	–

=== Episode 5 (June 10) ===
During the episode, Ricardo Montaner performed "La Cima del Cielo".

Order	Artist	Age	Hometown	Song	Coach's and artist's choices			
Order	Artist	Age	Hometown	Song	Ricardo	Belinda	María José	Christian
1	Alonso Hernández	28	Mexico City	"I'll Never Love Again"	✔	–	–	–
2	Leslye Horcacitas	27	Mexico City	"Será le Aire"	–	–	–	–
3	Sara Rubí	24	Córdoba, Veracruz	"Los Laureles"	–	–	✔	✔
4	Gabby Muller	27	Tampico, Tamaulipas	"Dangerous Woman"	✔	✔	✔	✔
5	Primavera Alejandre	27	Cerro Azul, Veracruz	"You Shook Me All Night Long"	–	–	✔	✔
6	Manuel Gayosso	39	Huazalingo, Hidalgo	"Sombrás"	–	–	–	–
7	Karely Esparza	35	Culiacán, Sinaloa	"You Don't Own Me"	✔	✔	✔	✔
8	Abel González	34	Tampico, Tamaulipas	"La Verdolaga"	–	–	–	✔
9	Luis Sandoval	–	Torreón, Coahuila	"Al Fin Te Encontré"	–	–	–	–
10	Nieves Loaiza	43	Mazatlán, Sinaloa	"Ya Te Perdí la Fe"	–	✔	–	✔
11	César Kafka	28	Tampico, Tamaulipas	"Vehicle"	–	–	✔	–

=== Episode 6 (June 11) ===
Order	Artist	Age	Hometown	Song	Coach's and artist's choices			
Order	Artist	Age	Hometown	Song	Ricardo	Belinda	María José	Christian
1	Magaly Beltrán	29	Mexico City	"Tata Dios"	–	–	–	–
2	Owen Padua	26	Toluca, Mexico State	"Writing's on the Wall"	–	✔	–	–
3	Pamela Maldonado	22	Villahermosa, Tabasco	"Stronger Than Me"	–	✔	–	✔
4	Montse Patraca	22	Minatitlán, Veracruz	"Te Regalo"	–	–	–	–
5	Rodolfo Padilla	26	Gómez Palacio, Durango	"Insoportablemente Bella"	✔	✔	✔	✔
6	Omar Contreras	24	Huejulta, Hidalgo	"El Lado Oscuro"	–	–	–	✔
7	Sandy Castillo	32	Cerro Azul, Veracruz	"Como Me Haces Falta"	✔	✔	✔	✔
8	Fer Arceo	24	Guadalajara, Jalisco	"No Le Llames Amor"	–	–	–	–
9	Danna y Carlos	15 & 40	Navojoa, Sonora	"Tú sangre en mi cuerpo"	–	–	–	–
10	Josafat e Imanol	21 & 19	Toluca, Mexico State	"Llegaste Tú"	✔	–	✔	–
11	Aranda Brizelly	19	Monterrey, Nuevo León	"Million Reasons"	–	–	–	–
12	Las Conde	–	La Paz, Baja California Sur	"ABC"	✔	✔	✔	✔
13	Genaro Perlo	25	Cerro Azul, Veracruz	"Pena Negra"	–	–	✔	–

=== Episode 7 (June 15) ===
During the episode, Christian Nodal performed "De Los Besos Que Te Di".

Order	Artist	Age	Hometown	Song	Coach's and artist's choices			
Order	Artist	Age	Hometown	Song	Ricardo	Belinda	María José	Christian
1	Alejandro Fuentes	35	Puebla, Puebla	"Amiga"	✔	–	–	✔
2	Estefania Lavalle	23	Mérida, Yucatán	"Prometiste"	–	–	–	–
3	Ricardo Larrazolo	26	Ciudad Victoria, Tamaulipas	"Bruja hada"	–	–	✔	–
4	Yuni Del Valle	40	Havana, Cuba	"Mi Mayor Venganza"	–	–	–	–
5	Sofia Schellemberg	29	Mexico City	"Ilusionado"	✔	✔	✔	✔
6	Miguel Segui	22	Mérida, Yucatán	"I Feel Good"	–	–	–	–
7	Cheyenne	24	Mexico City	"Tú sí sabes quererme"	✔	✔	–	–
8	Paola "Pao" Carrasco	28	Aguascalientes, Aguascalientes	"Someone like You"	✔	✔	✔	✔
9	Andrés Ayong	22	Ciudad Obregón, Sonora	"Te Fuiste de Aquí"	–	–	–	✔
10	Juan Ma	21	Mexico City	"If I Ain't Got You"	✘	✔	✔	✔
11	Marysol Pulido	48	Monterrey, Nuevo León	"No Voy en Tren"	–	–	–	–
12	Galván	32	Cholula, Puebla	"Mi Princesa"	✔	–	–	–

=== Episode 8 (June 16) ===
During the episode, María José performed "Lo Que Tenías Conmigo".

Order	Artist	Age	Hometown	Song	Coach's and artist's choices			
Order	Artist	Age	Hometown	Song	Ricardo	Belinda	María José	Christian
1	Meli Mendía	28	Mexico City	"Amor de Tres"	–	–	–	–
2	Yill	21	Monterrey, Nuevo León	"Finesse"	–	–	✔	–
3	Anhuar Ortega	29	Durango, Durango	"Voy a Llenarte Toda"	–	–	–	–
4	Ricardo Ramirez	22	Tampico, Tamaulipas	"Tutu"	✔	✔	–	–
5	Lunna Mursan	30	Caborca, Sonora	"Supiste Hacerme Mal"	–	–	–	–
6	Kaii Jimenez	29	Mexico City	"Si Tú Me Miras"	✔	✔	✔	✔
7	Laura Valman	30	Coatzacoalcos, Veracruz	"¿Que Boy Hacer Sin El"	–	–	–	–
8	Victor Gonzalez	33	Mérida, Yucatán	"Alfonsina y el Mar"	–	–	–	✔
9	Adi ML	16	Mexico City	"La Chancla"	–	–	–	–
10	Daniela Pedali	42	Mexico City	"And I Am Telling You I'm Not Going"	✔	✔	✔	✔
11	Karina Esparza	19	Culiacán, Sinaloa	"I Wanna Dance with Somebody"	✔	✔	–	–
12	Las Jimez	25 & 28	Pachuca, Hidalgo	"Cosas del Amor"	✔	✔	✔	✔
13	Kankel	36	Ciudad Victoria, Tamaulipas	"Suave"	–	–	–	–
14	Daniel Diesco	40	Brownsville, Texas	"Oh, Pretty Woman"	–	–	–	–
15	Héctor Castillo	35	Mexico City	"Te Esperaba"	–	–	–	✔

=== Episode 9 (June 17) ===
During the episode, Ricardo Montaner performed "Será".

Order	Artist	Age	Hometown	Song	Coach's and artist's choices			
Order	Artist	Age	Hometown	Song	Ricardo	Belinda	María José	Christian
1	Marilú Juarez	20	Texcoco, Mexico State	"Procuro Olvidarte"	✔	✔	–	–
2	Fernando Sujo	16	Torreón, Coahuila	"Llamarada"	✔	✔	✔	✔
3	Zafiro	35	Mexico City	"Bachata Rosa"	–	–	–	–
4	Gerardo Urquiza	47	Querétaro, Querétaro	"Malagueña Salerosa"	–	–	✔	–
5	Ernesto Díaz	32	Mexico City	"Si Tú Te Atreves"	–	–	–	–
6	Rodrigo Mena	23	Mexico City	"Iris"	–	–	–	✔
7	Pamela Libera	28	Mexico City	"La Fuerza del Destino"	–	–	–	–
8	Hugo Robles	32	Guadalajara, Jalisco	"TBC"	✔	✔	✔	–
9	Jessica Luna	30	Obregrón, Sonora	"Piece of My Heart"	✔	–	–	–
10	Dan Alcocer	27	Mexico City	"Pienso en Ti"	–	–	–	–
11	Grettel	20	León, Guanajuato	"A Moment Like This"	✔	✔	✔	✔
12	Fabiola Jaramillo	40	Orizaba, Veracruz	"Quiero Amanecer con Alguien"	✔	✔	–	–
13	Dali Sayago	23	Mexico City	"Mediocre"	–	–	–	–

=== Episode 10 (June 18) ===
During the episode, Belinda performed Luz Sin Gravedad.

Order	Artist	Age	Hometown	Song	Coach's and artist's choices			
Order	Artist	Age	Hometown	Song	Ricardo	Belinda	María José	Christian
1	Pedro Massuvatti	26	Mexico City	"No Te Apartes de Mi"	–	–	✔	–
2	Patricia Saucedo	27	Yurécuaro, Michoacán	"El Tiempo de Ti"	–	–	–	–
3	Alondra & Paola Ponce	25 & 25	Chontla, Veracruz	"Sueña"	–	–	–	✔
4	Sergio Aquino	22	Mexico City	"Dame"	✔	✔	–	–
5	Miguel Evadista	23	Mexico City	"Uno de Tantos"	–	–	–	–
6	Yahel Gozz	27	Guadalajara, Jalisco	"Invéntame"	✔	✔	–	–
7	Xime León	33	San Luis Potosí, San Luis Potosí	"Love Hurts"	–	–	–	–
8	Nere Barajas	25	Zapotlanejo, Jalisco	"Oye Pablo"	–	–	–	✔
9	Alexis Tanguma	20	Monterrey, Nuevo León	"Bailar"	✔	✔	✔	✔
10	Diana Roca	31	Torreón, Coahuila	"Scars to Your Beautiful"	–	–	–	–
11	Abdiel Roses	15	Tampico, Tamaulipas	"Yo Quisiera"	–	✔	–	✔
12	Ana Viniegra	33	Cerro Azul, Veracruz	"Sueños Rotos"	–	–	–	–
13	Irlanda González	29	Monterrey, Nuevo León	"Chandelier"	✔	✘	✔	✔
14	Iván Cortés	31	Mexico City	"Tus Latidos"	–	–	–	✔

=== Episode 11 (June 22) ===
Order	Artist	Age	Hometown	Song	Coach's and artist's choices			
Order	Artist	Age	Hometown	Song	Ricardo	Belinda	María José	Christian
1	Las Pereira	46 & 48	Puebla, Puebla	"¿Cómo te va mi amor?"	✔	✔	–	–
2	Mirelle Rivera	43	Mexico City	"Loca"	–	–	–	–
3	Vicky Cabrera	41	Altamirano, Guerrero	"Señor Amante"	–	✔	–	–
4	Eduardo Romo	28	Mexico City	"Cama de Rosas"	–	–	–	–
5	Jorge Cano	35	Tampico, Tamaulipas	"Corazón"	✔	✔	✔	✔
6	Karen Ricoy	19	León, Guanajuato	"The Scientist"	✔	✔	✔	✔
7	Juan Jesús Martinez	25	Cerro Azul, Veracruz	"Que Lo Nuestro quede Nuestro"	✔	–	–	✔
8	Luna León	21	Ciudad Victoria, Tamaulipas	"Que Bonito"	–	–	–	–
9	Sandra Padilla	28	Degollado, Jalisco	"La Gran Señora"	✔	✔	✔	✔
10	Eddy Peña	26	Texcoco, Mexico State	"El Dia que me Quieras"	✔	✔	–	–
11	Arnoldo Tapia	25	Obregón, Sonora	"Dónde Estará Mi Primavera"	✔	✘	✔	✔
12	Yared	36	Matamoros, Tamaulipas	"¿Qué Hago Yo?"	–	–	–	–
13	Felipe Álvarez	33	Monterrey, Nuevo León	"Another One Bites the Dust"	✔	✔	✔	✔

=== Episode 12 (June 23) ===
Order	Artist	Age	Hometown	Song	Coach's and artist's choices			
Order	Artist	Age	Hometown	Song	Ricardo	Belinda	María José	Christian
1	Gaby Teijo	50	Mexico State	"Te Quiero, Te Quiero"	✔	✔	–	✔
2	Abner Medina	26	Aguascalientes, Aguascalientes	"Duele"	✘	✔	✔	✔
3	Alejandra Iglesias	25	Naranjos, Veracruz	"Amigos No Por Favor"	✔	✔	–	–
4	Azul Aimé	21	Guadalajara, Jalisco	"1, 2, 3"	✘	✔	✔	✔
5	Sebas Espejo	30	Buenos Aires, Argentina	"El Ruido"	–	–	–	–
6	Any Banda	29	Durango, Durango	"Hoy Ya Me Voy"	✔	✔	✔	✔
7	MyMy	29 & 34	Hermosillo, Sonora	"Mujer Contra Mujer"	✔	✔	✔	✔
8	Montse Bernal	23	Guadalajara, Jalisco	"La Bruja"	–	✔	–	✔
9	Roberto Matzumoto	31	Tampico, Tamaulipas	"Lo Legal"	–	–	–	–
10	Mar Puente	25	Mérida, Yucatán	"La Loca"	✔	✔	✔	✔
11	Loreli Analis	35	Altamira, Tamaulipas	"November Rain"	–	–	–	–
12	Maximo Franco	29	Guadalajara, Jalisco	"Antes Que No"	✔	–	–	–

=== Episode 13 (June 24) ===
Order	Artist	Age	Hometown	Song	Coach's and artist's choices			
Order	Artist	Age	Hometown	Song	Ricardo	Belinda	María José	Christian
1	Astrid Selene	27	Monterrey, Nuevo León	"Que lloro"	–	–	–	–
2	Sebastián Miranda	19	Mexico City	"Cristina"	–	–	–	–
3	Ari Benedick	34	Puebla, Puebla	"Vida loca"	✔	✔	–	–
4	Leslie Palma	16	Ciudad Juárez, Chihuahua	"Puño de Diamantes"	–	–	–	✔
5	Isaías Niño	27	Monterrey, Nuevo León	"Te me vas"	–	–	–	–
6	Alex Schaar	49	Mexico City	"Home Sweet Home"	✔	✔	✔	✔
7	Karla Kobach	33	Mexico City	"Pa' ti no estoy"	–	✔	–	✔
8	Brian Álvarez	24	Tehuacán, Puebla	"El jinete"	–	✔	–	–
9	Jersey Goitia	22	Torreón, Coahuila	"Solo con verte"	–	–	–	–
10	Betty Love	39	Mexico State	"Funeral"	✔	✔	✔	✔
11	Karen Nava	38	Mexico City	"Te solté la rienda"	–	–	–	–
12	Mercedes De Angoitia	24	Mexico City	"Shallow"	✔	✔	✔	✔
13	Manuel Bustamante	30	Oaxaca, Oaxaca	"Tal Vez"	–	–	–	–
14	Emilio Cámara	28	Durango, Durango	"A Medio Vivir"	✔	–	–	–
15	Albania Rodríguez	30	Reynosa, Tamaulipas	"Leona dormida"	–	–	–	–

=== Episode 14 (June 25) ===
Order	Artist	Age	Hometown	Song	Coach's and artist's choices			
Order	Artist	Age	Hometown	Song	Ricardo	Belinda	María José	Christian
1	Noah	42	Mazatlán, Sinaloa	"No Me Lo Puedo Explicar"	–	–	–	–
2	César López	50	Chihuahua, Chihuahua	"¿De qué me sirve el cielo?"	–	–	–	–
3	Anabel Paz	18	Ensenada, Baja California	"Me Vas a Extrañar"	✔	✔	–	–
4	Vik Guga	35	Mexico City	"Aquí"	–	–	–	–
5	Sofía Guardiola	19	Cancún, Quintana Roo	"Tormento"	✔	✔	✔	✔
6	Stefany Torres	19	Tonalá, Jalisco	"Pídeme"	✔	–	–	✔
7	Gabriel Covagil	31	Mexico State	"Always on My Mind"	–	–	–	–
8	Manuel Medina	24	Guasave, Sinaloa	"Al Diablo lo Nuestro"	–	–	–	✔
9	Keyra Valay	24	León, Guanajuato	"Para Volver a Amar"	✔	–	✔	–
10	Andresse	24	Obregón, Sonora	"Mía"	✔	✔	✔	✔
11	Noren Luna	24	Mexico City	"No Me Queda Más"	–	–	–	–
12	Alejandra de Garay	30	Playa del Carmen, Quintana Roo	"Dance Monkey"	✔	✔	✔	✔
13	Tanya Valenzuela	35	Hermosillo, Sonora	"Me Siento Tan Sola"	–	–	–	–
14	Frida Piña	28	Tijuana, Baja California	"No Te Olvidaré"	✔	✔	✔	–
15	Eder Sosa	26	Mérida, Yucatán	"A Little Respect"	–	–	–	–

=== Episode 15 (June 29) ===
Order	Artist	Age	Hometown	Song	Coach's and artist's choices			
Order	Artist	Age	Hometown	Song	Ricardo	Belinda	María José	Christian
1	Sara Aimeé	23	Querétaro, Querétaro	"El sueño imposible"	–	✔	✔	–
2	Marìa Renée	19	Mexico State	"These Boots Are Made for Walkin'"	–	✔	✔	✔
3	Kike Jiménez	29	Guadalajara, Jalisco	"Take Me to Church"	✔	✔	✔	✔
4	Damiana Villa	43	Mexico City	"La media vuelta"	–	–	–	–
5	Aura	31	Mexico State	"Ahora entendí"	✔	–	–	–
6	Marah	25	Acayucan, Veracruz	"El Cristal"	✔	✔	✔	–
7	Pedro Herrera	21	Navojoa, Sonora	"Remolino"	✔	✔	✔	✔
8	Sofía Meza	23	Obregón, Sonora	"Héroe"	–	–	–	–
9	Rafael Castañón	27	Durango, Durango	"Don't Stop Me Now"	✔	✔	✔	–
10	Gaspar Romero	44	Boca del Río, Veracruz	"El amor de mi vida"	–	–	–	–
11	Cuates Berumen	20	Aguascalientes, Aguascalientes	"Pienso en ti"	✔	✔	–	✔
12	Nain Jurado	34	Puebla, Puebla	"La Locura"	–	–	–	–

=== Episode 16 (June 30) ===
During the episode, Ricardo Montaner performed "Te Adoraré" and Christian Nodal performed "No Te Contaron Mal".

Order	Artist	Age	Hometown	Song	Coach's and artist's choices			
Order	Artist	Age	Hometown	Song	Ricardo	Belinda	María José	Christian
1	Alejandro Lara	20	Tuxtla Gutiérrez, Chiapas	"Bonita"	–	–	–	–
2	Vanessa Payan	24	Durango, Durango	"En Peligro de Extincion"	–	✔	–	–
3	Nandy Cupil	39	Macuspana, Tabasco	"Personal Jesus"	–	–	–	✔
4	Elmer Robs	40	Veracruz, Veracruz	"Mi Media Mitad"	–	–	–	–
5	Alex Sevilla	32	Cancún, Quintana Roo	"Memories"	✔	✔	✔	✔
6	Karen Toretto	25	Durango, Durango	"Vuélveme a Querer"	–	–	–	–
7	Alinka	35	Mexico State	"A Chillar a otra parte"	✔	–	✔	–
8	Ariadna Contreras	28	Huejutla, Hidalgo	"Un Pato"	–	–	–	–
9	Anny Lynno	29	Ciudad Madero, Tamaulipas	Me Cuesta Tanto Olvidarte"	✔	✔	✔	–
10	Rodriguez	40	San Bernardo, Chile	"Que Precio tiene el Cielo"	–	✔	✔	–
11	Laura María	26	Navojoa, Sonora	"Como Fui a Enamorarme de Ti"	–	–	–	–
12	Daniela & Fuensanta	24 & 21	Puebla, Puebla	"Say My Name"	✔	✔	–	–
13	Alex Cabada	24	Tijuana, Baja California	"Saturno"	–	–	–	–
14	Miriam Mar	26	Cerro Azul, Veracruz	"Hazme Olvidarlo"	✔	–	–	–

=== Episode 17 (July 1) ===
During the episode, María José performed "Evidencias".

Order	Artist	Age	Hometown	Song	Coach's and artist's choices			
Order	Artist	Age	Hometown	Song	Ricardo	Belinda	María José	Christian
1	Anahí Manzanero	30	Mérida, Yucatán	"Entre mis recuerdos"	–	–	–	–
2	Tiffany	28	Querétaro, Querétaro	"Te amo"	✔	–	–	–
3	Lendor	22	Tampico, Tamaulipas	"Somewhere Only We Know"	✔	✔	–	–
4	Gaby Torres	27	Culiacán, Sinaloa	"A quien"	–	–	–	–
5	Scarlet Ceballos	23	Puerto Vallarta, Jalisco	"Believe"	✔	✔	✔	–
6	Alejandro HG	26	Ciudad Victoria, Tamaulipas	"Contigo puedo ser quien soy"	✔	✔	–	–
7	Juan Navarro	52	Veracruz, Veracruz	"Perfidia"	–	–	–	–
8	Mila Gaos	23	Mexico City	"Big Girls Don't Cry"	✔	✔	–	–
9	Heriberto Jimenez	27	Nuevo Laredo, Tamaulipas	"Amor Completo"	✔	✔	✔	–
10	Álvaro Velsan	19	San Luis Potosí, San Luis Potosí	"Perdóname"	–	–	✔	–
11	Dafne Celada	32	Huamantla, Tlaxcala	"La luna del cielo"	–	✔	–	–
12	Diego Leal	25	Mexico City	"Millonario de amor"	–	–	–	–
13	Laura Argelia	41	Mexico State	"Me he enamorado de ti"	✔	✔	✔	–
14	Karla Jireth	39	Mexico City	"Se te salió mi nombre"	–	–	–	–

=== Episode 18 (July 2) ===
During the episode, Belinda performed "En El Amor Hay Que Perdonar".

Order	Artist	Age	Hometown	Song	Coach's and artist's choices			
Order	Artist	Age	Hometown	Song	Ricardo	Belinda	María José	Christian
1	Juan Luis Orozco	28	Los Mochis, Sinaloa	"Ese loco soy yo"	✔	–	–	–
2	Yessika Rua	36	Los Cabos, Baja California Sur	"Devuélveme la vida"	–	–	–	–
3	Diana Delgado	22	Ciudad Acuña, Coahuila	"Una mañana"	–	✔	–	✔
4	Luis Flores "Wizwod"	21	Ciudad Juárez, Chihuahua	"No puedo dejarte de amar"	–	–	–	–
5	Mon Franco	32	Guadalajara, Jalisco	"Stay"	✔	✔	✔	–
6	Karely Gómez	35	Ciudad Cuauhtémoc, Chihuahua	"Ya Lo Sé"	–	✔	✔	–
7	Mario de la Garza	30	Monterrey, Nuevo León	"Halo"	✔	✔	–	–
8	Edgar Axel Rebollar	25	Jungapeo, Michoacán	"Aunque no sea conmigo"	–	–	–	–
9	Majo Cornejo	25	Mexico City	"Hello"	✔	✔	✔	–
10	Antonio Ramírez	20	Zapotlán, Jalisco	"Lloviendo estrellas"	✔	–	–	–
11	Jorge Mascareño	25	Los Mochis, Sinaloa	"¿Cómo pagarte?"	–	–	–	–
12	Natalia Marrokin	26	Mexico City	"Higher Ground"	✔	✔	✔	✔
13	Cristian Escalante	25	Pánuco, Veracruz	"Fantasía"	–	–	–	–

=== Episode 19 (July 6) ===
During the episode Christian Nodal performed "Adiós Amor" and María José performed "Lo Que Tenías Conmigo".

Order	Artist	Age	Hometown	Song	Coach's and artist's choices			
Order	Artist	Age	Hometown	Song	Ricardo	Belinda	María José	Christian
1	Danfer	30	Ciudad de México	"Háblame"	–	–	–	–
2	Alex Rey	27	Villahermosa, Tabasco	"Imaginame Sin Ti"	–	✔	–	–
3	Irma Flores	29	Mexico City	"The Winner Takes It All"	–	✔	✔	–
4	Mac Gregor	24	Querétaro, Querétaro	"Para Tu Amor"	–	–	–	–
5	Shinobi Ortiz	42	Durango, Durango	"Crazy"	–	✔	✔	–
6	Joanna Valencia	28	Tampico, Tamaulipas	"Bailar contigo"	–	✔	–	–
7	Daniela Cortés	20	Mexico State	"Otro día más sin verte"	✔	✔	✔	–
8	Jossué Gonzáles	30	Guerrero Negro, Baja California Sur	"Ángel"	✔	✔	✔	–
9	Alex Borja	38	Querétaro, Querétaro	"It's My Life"	–	–	–	–
10	Tony Rusher	36	Puebla, Puebla	"Angel"	✔	✔	✔	–
11	Prudence	25	Mexico City	"Dream On"	✔	✔	✔	✘
12	Bernardo	24	Cuernavaca, Morelos	"Use Somebody"	–	–	–	–

=== Episode 20 (July 7) ===
During the episode Ricardo Montaner performed "Tan Enamorados" and Belinda performed "Litost".

Order	Artist	Age	Hometown	Song	Coach's and artist's choices			
Order	Artist	Age	Hometown	Song	Ricardo	Belinda	María José	Christian
1	Laura Rubio	33	Mexico City	"El primer día del resto de mi vida"	–	–	–	–
2	Liz Flores	39	Veracruz	"Careless Whisper"	✔	–	–	–
3	Jonathan Sandoval	36	Caracas, Venezuela	"Por ti volaré"	–	✔	–	–
4	Teresa Gallegos	18	Tijuana, Baja California	"Mi buen corazón"	–	–	–	–
5	Lau Miranda	29	Los Angeles, California	"La Mejor Versión de Mí"	–	–	–	–
6	Quique Montes	34	Torrevieja, Spain	"Tiburones"	–	✔	–	–
7	Luis Daniel Herca	21	Oaxaca, Oaxaca	"Señora"	✔	✔	–	–
8	Grace Guillen	29	Culiacán, Sinaloa	"Fallaste corazón"	–	✔	✔	–
9	Goyo Estrada	24	San Luis Potosí	"Llévame Contigo"	–	–	–	–
10	Gemelas Nevares	21	León, Guanajuato	"Lo Aprendí de Ti"	–	✔	✔	✔
11	Montserrat Cruz	20	Monterrey, Nuevo León	"Cobarde"	✔	✔	✔	Team full
12	Yanina	35	Mexico City	"Fallin'"	Team full	✔	✔	Team full
13	Mauricio Vaez	33	Monterrey, Nuevo León	"Favorito"	Team full	✔	Team full	Team full

== The Knockouts ==
The Knockout Rounds started July 13. Unlike season eight where coaches had three steals, this season coaches can steal two losing artists from other coaches. Contestants who win their knockout or are stolen by another coach advance to The Battles.

Color key:

Artist won the Knockout and advanced to The Battles
Artist lost the Knockout but was stolen by another coach and advanced to The Battles
Artist lost the Knockout and was eliminated
Artist voluntarily left the competition

Episode	Coach	Order	Song	Winner	Losers	Song	'Steal' result			
Episode	Coach	Order	Song	Winner	Losers	Song	Ricardo	Belinda	María José	Christian
Episode 21 (Monday, July 13, 2020)	María José	1	"Sola"	Irlanda González	Karely Gómez	"Si Quieres Verme Llorar"	—	—	N/A	—
Episode 21 (Monday, July 13, 2020)	María José	1	"Sola"	Irlanda González	Irma Flores	"I Will Survive"	—	—	N/A	—
Episode 21 (Monday, July 13, 2020)	Belinda	2	"It Will Rain"	Juan Ma	Rodolfo Padilla	"Quién"	—	N/A	—	—
Episode 21 (Monday, July 13, 2020)	Belinda	2	"It Will Rain"	Juan Ma	Owen Padua	"Volverás"	—	N/A	—	—
Episode 21 (Monday, July 13, 2020)	Ricardo Montaner	3	"Y volveré"	Fabiola Jaramillo	Las Pereira	"Si la quieres"	N/A	—	—	—
Episode 21 (Monday, July 13, 2020)	Ricardo Montaner	3	"Y volveré"	Fabiola Jaramillo	Gaby Teijo	"No Soy el Aire"	N/A	—	—	—
Episode 21 (Monday, July 13, 2020)	Christian Nodal	4	"Mátalas"	Abel González	Iván Cortés	"Èchame a mi la culpa"	—	—	—	N/A
Episode 21 (Monday, July 13, 2020)	Christian Nodal	4	"Mátalas"	Abel González	Reyes	"Me Sobrabas Tú"	—	—	—	N/A
Episode 21 (Monday, July 13, 2020)	Ricardo Montaner	5	"Like I'm Gonna Lose You"	Adria & Lluvia Acuña	Alejandra Iglesias	"Por eso te amo"	N/A	—	—	—
Episode 21 (Monday, July 13, 2020)	Ricardo Montaner	5	"Like I'm Gonna Lose You"	Adria & Lluvia Acuña	Máximo Franco	"Recuédame"	N/A	—	—	—
Episode 21 (Monday, July 13, 2020)	Christian Nodal	6	"Mercy"	Pamela Maldonado	Azul Aimé	"Riptide"	—	—	—	N/A
Episode 21 (Monday, July 13, 2020)	Christian Nodal	6	"Mercy"	Pamela Maldonado	Nere Barajas	"Eres Tú"	—	—	—	N/A
Episode 21 (Monday, July 13, 2020)	Ricardo Montaner	7	"No Basta"	Emilio Cámara	Tony Rosher	"La Incondicional"	N/A	—	—	—
Episode 21 (Monday, July 13, 2020)	Ricardo Montaner	7	"No Basta"	Emilio Cámara	Ari Benedick	"Un Beso Grande"	N/A	—	—	—
Episode 21 (Monday, July 13, 2020)	Belinda	8	"The Show Must Go On"	Prudence	Yahel Gozz	"River"	—	N/A	—	—
Episode 21 (Monday, July 13, 2020)	Belinda	8	"The Show Must Go On"	Prudence	Rafael Castañón	"I Was Made for Lovin' You"	—	N/A	—	—
Episode 22 (Tuesday, July 14, 2020)	María José	1	"Oye"	Majo Cornejo	Sara Aimeé	"Sería Más Fácil"	—	—	N/A	—
Episode 22 (Tuesday, July 14, 2020)	María José	1	"Oye"	Majo Cornejo	Little Coco	"Wrecking Ball"	—	—	N/A	—
Episode 22 (Tuesday, July 14, 2020)	Ricardo Montaner	2	"Y, ¿Si Fuera Ella?"	Alexis Tanguma	Antonio Ramírez	"Ven junto a mi"	N/A	—	—	—
Episode 22 (Tuesday, July 14, 2020)	Ricardo Montaner	2	"Y, ¿Si Fuera Ella?"	Alexis Tanguma	Luis Daniel Herca	"Penelope"	N/A	—	—	—
Episode 22 (Tuesday, July 14, 2020)	Belinda	3	"Blanco y Negro"	Scarlett Chico	Dafne Celada	"Venus"	—	N/A	—	—
Episode 22 (Tuesday, July 14, 2020)	Belinda	3	"Blanco y Negro"	Scarlett Chico	Vicky Cabrera	"Amor Mío, ¿Qué Me Has Hecho?"	—	N/A	—	—
Episode 22 (Tuesday, July 14, 2020)	Christian Nodal	4	"Los Días Felices"	Fernando Sujo	Manuel Medina	"Seremos"	—	—	—	N/A
Episode 22 (Tuesday, July 14, 2020)	Christian Nodal	4	"Los Días Felices"	Fernando Sujo	Leslie Palma	"Como la Flor"	—	—	—	N/A
Episode 22 (Tuesday, July 14, 2020)	Belinda	5	"All I Ask"	Mario de la Garza	Jonathan Sandoval	"Amazing Grace"	—	N/A	—	—
Episode 22 (Tuesday, July 14, 2020)	Belinda	5	"All I Ask"	Mario de la Garza	Heriberto Jiménez	"Ódiame"	—	N/A	—	—
Episode 22 (Tuesday, July 14, 2020)	María José	6	"Aprendiz"	Laura Ruíz	Sandy Castillo	"Lo Mejor de Mí"	—	✔	N/A	✔
Episode 22 (Tuesday, July 14, 2020)	María José	6	"Aprendiz"	Laura Ruíz	Pao Carrasco	"Contigo en la Distancia"	✔	—	N/A	—
Episode 22 (Tuesday, July 14, 2020)	Ricardo Montaner	7	"Love Me like You Do"	Mila Gaos	Mon Franco	"Don't Start Now"	N/A	—	—	—
Episode 22 (Tuesday, July 14, 2020)	Ricardo Montaner	7	"Love Me like You Do"	Mila Gaos	Kike Jiménez	"Smooth"	N/A	✔	✔	—
Episode 22 (Tuesday, July 14, 2020)	María José	8	"Lloran Las Rosas"	Pedro Herrera	Josafat e Imanol	"Si la ves"	—	—	N/A	—
Episode 22 (Tuesday, July 14, 2020)	María José	8	"Lloran Las Rosas"	Pedro Herrera	Álvaro Velsan	"Me Hace Tanto Bien"	—	—	N/A	—
Episode 23 (Monday, July 20, 2020)	María José	1	"Someone You Loved"	Tomás Mándel	Ricardo Larrazolo	"Eres Tanto"	—	—	N/A	—
Episode 23 (Monday, July 20, 2020)	María José	1	"Someone You Loved"	Tomás Mándel	Gerardo Urquiza	"Y Tú"	—	—	N/A	—
Episode 23 (Monday, July 20, 2020)	Belinda	2	"Who's Lovin' You"	Karely Esparza	Abner Medina	"Call Out My Name"	—	N/A	—	—
Episode 23 (Monday, July 20, 2020)	Belinda	2	"Who's Lovin' You"	Karely Esparza	Lendor	"Volverte a Amar"	—	N/A	—	—
Episode 23 (Monday, July 20, 2020)	Christian Nodal	3	"Disculpe Usted"	Nieves Loaiza	Alejandro Fuentes	"Para Enamorarte De Mí"	—	—	—	N/A
Episode 23 (Monday, July 20, 2020)	Christian Nodal	3	"Disculpe Usted"	Nieves Loaiza	Lalo Fuentes	"Me Acordaré de Ti"	—	—	—	N/A
Episode 23 (Monday, July 20, 2020)	María José	4	"Rómpeme El Corazón"	Betty Love	Felipe Álvarez	"The Reason"	—	—	N/A	—
Episode 23 (Monday, July 20, 2020)	María José	4	"Rómpeme El Corazón"	Betty Love	Yari Pimentel	"Hoy"	—	—	N/A	—
Episode 23 (Monday, July 20, 2020)	Ricardo Montaner	5	"Stayin' Alive"	Las Conde	Vivozes	"Aquí Estoy Yo"	N/A	—	—	—
Episode 23 (Monday, July 20, 2020)	Ricardo Montaner	5	"Stayin' Alive"	Las Conde	Eddy Peña	"Cien Años"	N/A	—	—	—
Episode 23 (Monday, July 20, 2020)	Christian Nodal	6	"Adelante Corazón"	Yuli Flores	Víctor González	"Hijo de la Luna"	—	—	—	N/A
Episode 23 (Monday, July 20, 2020)	Christian Nodal	6	"Adelante Corazón"	Yuli Flores	Héctor Castillo	"Agua Nueva"	—	—	—	N/A
Episode 23 (Monday, July 20, 2020)	Belinda	7	"L-O-V-E"	Karen de la Puente	Marah	"Afuera"	—	N/A	—	—
Episode 23 (Monday, July 20, 2020)	Belinda	7	"L-O-V-E"	Karen de la Puente	Daniela & Fuensanta	"Lady Marmalade"	'✔	N/A	—	—
Episode 23 (Monday, July 20, 2020)	Christian Nodal	8	"Besos y Copas"	Sara Rubí	Montse Bernal	"El Cascabel"	Team full	—	—	N/A
Episode 23 (Monday, July 20, 2020)	Christian Nodal	8	"Besos y Copas"	Sara Rubí	Stefany Torres	"Después de ti ¿Quién?"	Team full	—	—	N/A
Episode 24 (Tuesday, July 21, 2020)	Belinda	1	"Ya Me Enteré"	Grace Guillén	Mary Ángel	"Me fui"	Team full	N/A	—	—
Episode 24 (Tuesday, July 21, 2020)	Belinda	1	"Ya Me Enteré"	Grace Guillén	Vanessa Payán	"Mi Enemigo el Amor"	Team full	N/A	—	—
Episode 24 (Tuesday, July 21, 2020)	María José	2	"Feel"	Fer Haneine	Shinobi Ortiz	"Again"	Team full	—	N/A	—
Episode 24 (Tuesday, July 21, 2020)	María José	2	"Feel"	Fer Haneine	Yill	"Mayores"	Team full	—	N/A	—
Episode 24 (Tuesday, July 21, 2020)	Belinda	3	"My Sacrifice"	Nicholas Griffin	Alejandro HG	"Yo No Sé Mañana"	Team full	N/A	—	—
Episode 24 (Tuesday, July 21, 2020)	Belinda	3	"My Sacrifice"	Nicholas Griffin	Quique Montes	"Temblando"	Team full	N/A	—	—
Episode 24 (Tuesday, July 21, 2020)	Ricardo Montaner	4	"Beautiful"	Glenda Ramírez	Anny Montes	"Eres"	Team full	—	—	—
Episode 24 (Tuesday, July 21, 2020)	Ricardo Montaner	4	"Beautiful"	Glenda Ramírez	Bigi	"Sodio"	Team full	—	—	'✔
Episode 24 (Tuesday, July 21, 2020)	Christian Nodal	5	"La Dificil"	Alex Sevilla	Omar Contreras	"¿Qué nos pasó?"	Team full	—	—	Team full
Episode 24 (Tuesday, July 21, 2020)	Christian Nodal	5	"La Dificil"	Alex Sevilla	León	"Querido Corazón"	Team full	—	—	Team full
Episode 24 (Tuesday, July 21, 2020)	Ricardo Montaner	6	"Dime"	Jorge Quintero	Juan Luis Orozco	"Otra Vez"	Team full	—	—	Team full
Episode 24 (Tuesday, July 21, 2020)	Ricardo Montaner	6	"Dime"	Jorge Quintero	Marilú Juárez	"Insensinle a ti"	Team full	—	—	Team full
Episode 24 (Tuesday, July 21, 2020)	Christian Nodal	7	"A lo Mejor"	Gemelas Nevares	Anilú Davila	"De qué te vale fingir"	Team full	—	—	Team full
Episode 24 (Tuesday, July 21, 2020)	Christian Nodal	7	"A lo Mejor"	Gemelas Nevares	Mar Puente	Ese Beso"	Team full	—	✔	Team full
Episode 24 (Tuesday, July 21, 2020)	María José	8	"Rise Up"	Quetzaly	Genaro Perlo	"Por Cobardia"	Team full	—	Team full	Team full
Episode 24 (Tuesday, July 21, 2020)	María José	8	"Rise Up"	Quetzaly	Rodriguez	"Felices los 4"	Team full	—	Team full	Team full
Episode 25 (Monday, July 27, 2020)	Christian Nodal	1	"Rock Steady"	Natalia Marrokin	Karla Kobach	"Como Quieres Que Te Quiera"	Team full	—	Team full	Team full
Episode 25 (Monday, July 27, 2020)	Christian Nodal	1	"Rock Steady"	Natalia Marrokin	Marlene Lechuga	"Tengo Todo Excepto a Ti"	Team full	✔	Team full	Team full
Episode 25 (Monday, July 27, 2020)	Belinda	2	"Love on the Brain"	Mercedes de Angoitia	Joanna Valencia	"La Vida Después de Ti"	Team full	N/A	Team full	Team full
Episode 25 (Monday, July 27, 2020)	Belinda	2	"Love on the Brain"	Mercedes de Angoitia	Frida Piña	"Estoy Aquí"	Team full	N/A	Team full	Team full
Episode 25 (Monday, July 27, 2020)	Ricardo Montaner	3	"No me enseñaste"	Daniela Cortés	Alejandra De Garay	"Back to Black"	Team full	—	Team full	Team full
Episode 25 (Monday, July 27, 2020)	Ricardo Montaner	3	"No me enseñaste"	Daniela Cortés	Jessica Luna	"Loca"	Team full	—	Team full	Team full
Episode 25 (Monday, July 27, 2020)	María José	4	"Lost on You"	Sofía Guardiola	Giuly Baraldi	"Corazón En La Maleta"	Team full	—	Team full	Team full
Episode 25 (Monday, July 27, 2020)	María José	4	"Lost on You"	Sofía Guardiola	Las Jimez	"¿Qué Me Faltó?"	Team full	—	Team full	Team full
Episode 25 (Monday, July 27, 2020)	Ricardo Montaner	5	"What's Up?"	Montserrat Cruz	Tiffany	"El Amor Acaba"	Team full	—	Team full	Team full
Episode 25 (Monday, July 27, 2020)	Ricardo Montaner	5	"What's Up?"	Montserrat Cruz	Liz Flores	"Como Hemos Cambiado"	Team full	—	Team full	Team full
Episode 25 (Monday, July 27, 2020)	Christian Nodal	6	"Vuelve"	Arnoldo Tapia	Cuates Berunen	"El Color de Tus Ojos"	Team full	—	Team full	Team full
Episode 25 (Monday, July 27, 2020)	Christian Nodal	6	"Vuelve"	Arnoldo Tapia	Juan Jesús Martínez	"Sólo Con Un Beso"	Team full	—	Team full	Team full
Episode 25 (Monday, July 27, 2020)	Belinda	7	"Crazy in Love" / "La copa de la Vida"	DYF	MyMy	"Son de Amores"	Team full	N/A	Team full	Team full
Episode 25 (Monday, July 27, 2020)	Belinda	7	"Crazy in Love" / "La copa de la Vida"	DYF	Daniela Pedali	"Run to You"	Team full	N/A	Team full	Team full
Episode 25 (Monday, July 27, 2020)	María José	8	"Faithfully"	Alex Schaar	César Kafka	"My Girl"	Team full	—	Team full	Team full
Episode 25 (Monday, July 27, 2020)	María José	8	"Faithfully"	Alex Schaar	Primavera Alejandre	"Ángel"	Team full	—	Team full	Team full
Episode 26 (Tuesday, July 28, 2020)	Belinda	1	"Castillo Azul"	Jossué González	Mauricio Vaez	"You're Still the One"	Team full	N/A	Team full	Team full
Episode 26 (Tuesday, July 28, 2020)	Belinda	1	"Castillo Azul"	Jossué González	Andresse	"Otras Vidas"	Team full	N/A	Team full	Team full
Episode 26 (Tuesday, July 28, 2020)	Christian Nodal	2	"Fly Me to the Moon"	Kaii Jiménez	Nandy Cupil	"You Are So Beautiful"	Team full	—	Team full	Team full
Episode 26 (Tuesday, July 28, 2020)	Christian Nodal	2	"Fly Me to the Moon"	Kaii Jiménez	Memo Blues	"Susie Q"	Team full	—	Team full	Team full
Episode 26 (Tuesday, July 28, 2020)	Ricardo Montaner	3	"At This Moment"	Alonso Hernández	Galván	"*****"	Team full	—	Team full	Team full
Episode 26 (Tuesday, July 28, 2020)	Ricardo Montaner	3	"At This Moment"	Alonso Hernández	Karina Esparza	"Scared to Be Lonely"	Team full	—	Team full	Team full
Episode 26 (Tuesday, July 28, 2020)	Christian Nodal	4	"7 Rings"	Kelly Castro	Andrés Ayong	"Se Supone"	Team full	—	Team full	Team full
Episode 26 (Tuesday, July 28, 2020)	Christian Nodal	4	"7 Rings"	Kelly Castro	Carol Ziehl	"Me Rehúso"	Team full	—	Team full	Team full
Episode 26 (Tuesday, July 28, 2020)	María José	5	"Tu falta de querer"	Karyna Rizos	Alinka	"Consecuencia de mis Actos"	Team full	—	Team full	Team full
Episode 26 (Tuesday, July 28, 2020)	María José	5	"Tu falta de querer"	Karyna Rizos	Mint Parker	"Jolene"	Team full	—	Team full	Team full
Episode 26 (Tuesday, July 28, 2020)	Ricardo Montaner	6	"Eres"	Anabel Paz	Miriam Mar	"Te quedó grande la yegua"	Team full	—	Team full	Team full
Episode 26 (Tuesday, July 28, 2020)	Ricardo Montaner	6	"Eres"	Anabel Paz	Dan y Rigo	"Ya No Tiene Novio"	Team full	—	Team full	Team full
Episode 26 (Tuesday, July 28, 2020)	Belinda	7	"Desconocidos"	Ángel Strife	Diana Delgado	"Si tú no estás aqui"	Team full	N/A	Team full	Team full
Episode 26 (Tuesday, July 28, 2020)	Belinda	7	"Desconocidos"	Ángel Strife	Cheyenne	"La Negra"	Team full	N/A	Team full	Team full
Episode 26 (Tuesday, July 28, 2020)	María José	8	"Ya No Quiero"	Any Banda	Hugo Robles	"En Cambio No"	Team full	—	Team full	Team full
Episode 26 (Tuesday, July 28, 2020)	María José	8	"Ya No Quiero"	Any Banda	Pedro Massucatti	"Love Yourself"	Team full	—	Team full	Team full
Episode 27 (Monday, August 3, 2020)	Christian Nodal	1	"Brillas"	HERSAH	Alondra & Paola	"Me Gustas"	Team full	—	Team full	Team full
Episode 27 (Monday, August 3, 2020)	Christian Nodal	1	"Brillas"	HERSAH	Sandra Padilla	"El Amor De Su Vida"	Team full	—	Team full	Team full
Episode 27 (Monday, August 3, 2020)	Belinda	2	"When We Were Young"	Gabby Muller	Alex Rey	"Amante del amor"	Team full	N/A	Team full	Team full
Episode 27 (Monday, August 3, 2020)	Belinda	2	"When We Were Young"	Gabby Muller	Brian Álvarez	"A Medio Vivir"	Team full	N/A	Team full	Team full
Episode 27 (Monday, August 3, 2020)	María José	3	"Valerie"	Scarlett Ceballos	Yanina	"Rehab"	Team full	—	Team full	Team full
Episode 27 (Monday, August 3, 2020)	María José	3	"Valerie"	Scarlett Ceballos	Felo	"Momentos"	Team full	—	Team full	Team full
Episode 27 (Monday, August 3, 2020)	Belinda	4	"Titanium"	Karen Ricoy	Ricardo Ramírez	"*****"	Team full	N/A	Team full	Team full
Episode 27 (Monday, August 3, 2020)	Belinda	4	"Titanium"	Karen Ricoy	Abdiel Roses	"Dejaría Todo"	Team full	N/A	Team full	Team full
Episode 27 (Monday, August 3, 2020)	María José	5	"Tattooed Heart"	Grettel	Keyra Valay	"Por Lo Que Reste De Vida"	Team full	—	Team full	Team full
Episode 27 (Monday, August 3, 2020)	María José	5	"Tattooed Heart"	Grettel	Luhana	"Y Hubo Alguien"	Team full	—	Team full	Team full
Episode 27 (Monday, August 3, 2020)	Ricardo Montaner	6	"The Greatest Love of All"	Laura Argelia	Carla Cerda	"Me Equivoqué"	Team full	—	Team full	Team full
Episode 27 (Monday, August 3, 2020)	Ricardo Montaner	6	"The Greatest Love of All"	Laura Argelia	Aura	"Pienso en Ti"	Team full	—	Team full	Team full
Episode 27 (Monday, August 3, 2020)	Christian Nodal	7	"Fell in Love with a Boy"	María Renée	Sofía Schellemberg	"Coleccionista de Canciones"	Team full	—	Team full	Team full
Episode 27 (Monday, August 3, 2020)	Christian Nodal	7	"Fell in Love with a Boy"	María Renée	Rodrigo Mena	"Bonita"	Team full	—	Team full	Team full
Episode 27 (Monday, August 3, 2020)	Ricardo Montaner	8	"Tu Corazón lo sabe"	Sergio Aquino	Mario Cruz	"De Qué Me Sirve la Vida"	Team full	✔	Team full	Team full
Episode 27 (Monday, August 3, 2020)	Ricardo Montaner	8	"Tu Corazón lo sabe"	Sergio Aquino	Jorge Cano	"Mi Ojos Lloran Por Ti"	Team full	—	Team full	Team full

== The Battles ==
The Battle Round started on August 4. The coaches can steal two losing artists from other coaches. Contestants who win their battle or are stolen by another coach will advance to the Top 3 Round.

Color key:

Artist won the Battle and advanced to the Top 3
Artist lost the Battle but was stolen by another coach and advanced to the Top 3
Artist lost the Battle and was eliminated

Episode	Coach	Order	Winner	Song	Loser	'Steal' result			
Episode	Coach	Order	Winner	Song	Loser	Ricardo	Belinda	María José	Christian
Episode 28 (Tuesday, August 4, 2020)	María José	1	Betty Love	"Quiero cantar"	Karyna Rizos	—	—	N/A	—
Episode 28 (Tuesday, August 4, 2020)	Christian Nodal	2	Fernando Sujo	"En El Jardín"	Gemelas Nevares	—	—	—	N/A
Episode 28 (Tuesday, August 4, 2020)	Belinda	3	Karely Esparza	"W.O.M.A.N"	Karen de la Puente	—	N/A	—	—
Episode 28 (Tuesday, August 4, 2020)	Ricardo Montaner	4	Adria & Lluvia Acuña	"Perdiendo la Cabeza"	Emilio Cámara	N/A	—	—	✔
Episode 28 (Tuesday, August 4, 2020)	Christian Nodal	5	Kelly Castro	"Sin Pijama"	Bigi	—	—	—	N/A
Episode 28 (Tuesday, August 4, 2020)	Belinda	6	Prudence	"Bring Me to Life"	Nicholas Griffin	—	N/A	—	—
Episode 28 (Tuesday, August 4, 2020)	María José	7	Tomás Mandel	"Escondidos"	Sofía Guardiola	✔	—	N/A	—
Episode 28 (Tuesday, August 4, 2020)	Ricardo Montaner	8	Laura Argelia	"Cómo Han Pasado Los Años"	Fabiola Jaramillo	N/A	—	—	—
Episode 29 (Monday, August 10, 2020)	Christian Nodal	1	Arnoldo Tapia	"Yo Te Prefiero a Ti"	HERSAH	—	—	—	N/A
Episode 29 (Monday, August 10, 2020)	María José	2	Any Banda	"Viveme"	Scarlett Ceballos	—	—	N/A	—
Episode 29 (Monday, August 10, 2020)	Belinda	3	Juan Ma	"Por Última Vez"	Karen Ricoy	—	N/A	—	—
Episode 29 (Monday, August 10, 2020)	Ricardo Montaner	4	Jorge Quintero	"Probablemente"	Daniela Cortés	N/A	✔	—	✔
Episode 29 (Monday, August 10, 2020)	Christian Nodal	5	María Renée	"Black Velvet"	Pamela Maldonado	—	—	—	Team full
Episode 29 (Monday, August 10, 2020)	Belinda	6	DYF	"Bésame Mucho"	Gabby Muller	✔	N/A	✔	Team full
Episode 29 (Monday, August 10, 2020)	María José	7	Majo Cornejo	"Amor, Amor"	Mar Puente	Team full	—	N/A	Team full
Episode 29 (Monday, August 10, 2020)	Ricardo Montaner	8	Mila Gaos	"Fascinación"	Sergio Aquino	Team full	—	—	Team full
Episode 30 (Tuesday, August 11, 2020)	Belinda	1	Mercedes de Angoitia	"Pero Me Acuerdo de Ti"	Marlene Lechuga	Team full	N/A	—	Team full
Episode 30 (Tuesday, August 11, 2020)	Ricardo Montaner	2	Pao Carrasco	"No Hace Falta"	Daniela & Fuensanta	Team full	—	—	Team full
Episode 30 (Tuesday, August 11, 2020)	Belinda	3	Scarlett Chico	"Destino o Casualidad"	Ángel Strife	Team full	N/A	—	Team full
Episode 30 (Tuesday, August 11, 2020)	Christian Nodal	4	Sara Rubí	"Esto Que Siento"	Abel González	Team full	—	—	Team full
Episode 30 (Tuesday, August 11, 2020)	María José	5	Fer Haneine	"Dónde está el Amor"	Grettel	Team full	—	N/A	Team full
Episode 30 (Tuesday, August 11, 2020)	Christian Nodal	6	Natalia Marrokin	"Fever"	Yuli Flores	Team full	✔	—	Team full
Episode 30 (Tuesday, August 11, 2020)	Ricardo Montaner	7	Alonso Hernández	"Nada Personal"	Montserrat Cruz	Team full	—	—	Team full
Episode 30 (Tuesday, August 11, 2020)	María José	8	Pedro Herrera	"Recuérdame"	Quetzaly	Team full	✔	N/A	Team full
Episode 31 (Monday, August 17, 2020)	Belinda	1	Jossué González	"Tanto"	Grace Guillen	Team full	Team full	—	Team full
Episode 31 (Monday, August 17, 2020)	María José	2	Kike Jiménez	"Come Together"	Alex Shaar	Team full	Team full	N/A	Team full
Episode 31 (Monday, August 17, 2020)	Christian Nodal	3	Alex Sevilla	"Falta Amor"	Kaii Jiménez	Team full	Team full	—	Team full
Episode 31 (Monday, August 17, 2020)	Ricardo Montaner	4	Las Conde	"Faith"	Glenda Ramírez	Team full	Team full	✔	Team full
Episode 31 (Monday, August 17, 2020)	María José	5	Irlanda González	"Una Mentira Más"	Laura Ruiz	Team full	Team full	N/A	Team full
Episode 31 (Monday, August 17, 2020)	Belinda	6	Mario de la Garza	"Pídeme"	Mario Cruz	Team full	Team full	—	Team full
Episode 31 (Monday, August 17, 2020)	Christian Nodal	7	Nieves Loaiza	"A Través del Vaso"	Sandy Castillo	Team full	Team full	—	Team full
Episode 31 (Monday, August 17, 2020)	Ricardo Montaner	8	Alexis Tanguma	"Tanto"	Anabel Paz	Team full	Team full	✔	Team full

Non-competition performances
Order	Performers	Song
28.1	Ricardo Montaner & María José	"Bésame"
29.1	Christian Nodal & Belinda	"De los besos que te di"
30.1	Ricardo Montaner & Christian Nodal	"Me va extrañar"
31.1	María José & Belinda	"Prefiero ser su amante"

== Top 3 ==
The Top 3 Round started on August 18. After every performance, the artist's coach decides if the artist deserves a spot in the team's Top 3. If yes, the artist is given a chair by their coach. When all chairs are occupied the coach chooses an artist to seize his/her spot to the new artist and gets eliminated. Artists who are denied a chair by the coach are automatically eliminated. The Top 3 from each team advanced to the Semifinal.

Color key

Artist was given a chair from his/her coach
Artist was not given a chair by his/her coach
Artist was eliminated automatically without chair given
Artist was given a chair but later eliminated in favor of another artist
Artist remained in a chair and advanced to the Semifinal

Episode	Coach	Order	Artist	Song	Chair	Artist Removed	Final Result
Episode 32 (Tuesday, August 18, 2020)	Ricardo Montaner	1	Jorge Quintero	"Enséñame A Olvidarte"		—	Eliminated
Episode 32 (Tuesday, August 18, 2020)	Ricardo Montaner	2	Laura Argelia	"Fame"		—	Eliminated
Episode 32 (Tuesday, August 18, 2020)	Ricardo Montaner	3	Mila Gaos	"Llorar"		—	Eliminated
Episode 32 (Tuesday, August 18, 2020)	Ricardo Montaner	4	Pao Carrasco	"Sabor a Mí"		Laura Argelia	Eliminated
Episode 32 (Tuesday, August 18, 2020)	Ricardo Montaner	5	Adria & Lluvia Acuña	"Falsas Esperanzas"		Jorge Quintero	Eliminated
Episode 32 (Tuesday, August 18, 2020)	María José	6	Tomás Mándel	"Bésame"		—	Eliminated
Episode 32 (Tuesday, August 18, 2020)	María José	7	Any Banda	"Acaríciame"		—	Eliminated
Episode 32 (Tuesday, August 18, 2020)	María José	8	Kike Jiménez	"Youngblood"		—	Advanced
Episode 32 (Tuesday, August 18, 2020)	María José	9	Anabel Paz	"Cielo rojo"		—	Eliminated
Episode 32 (Tuesday, August 18, 2020)	María José	10	Betty Love	"No"		Any Banda	Eliminated
Episode 32 (Tuesday, August 18, 2020)	Belinda	11	Mario de la Garza	"Llorar Duele Más"		—	Eliminated
Episode 32 (Tuesday, August 18, 2020)	Belinda	12	Yuli Flores	"Invencible"		—	Eliminated
Episode 32 (Tuesday, August 18, 2020)	Belinda	13	Jossué González	"Para Empezar"		—	Eliminated
Episode 32 (Tuesday, August 18, 2020)	Belinda	14	Quetzaly	"Cobarde"		—	Eliminated
Episode 32 (Tuesday, August 18, 2020)	Belinda	15	Prudence	"Rock and Roll"		Yuli Flores	Advanced
Episode 32 (Tuesday, August 18, 2020)	Christian Nodal	16	Alex Sevilla	"Shape of You"		—	Eliminated
Episode 32 (Tuesday, August 18, 2020)	Christian Nodal	17	Kelly Castro	"Havana"		—	Eliminated
Episode 32 (Tuesday, August 18, 2020)	Christian Nodal	18	Nieves Loaiza	"Se va muriendo mi alma"		—	Eliminated
Episode 32 (Tuesday, August 18, 2020)	Christian Nodal	19	Daniela Cortés	"La Soledad"		Nieves Loaiza	Eliminated
Episode 32 (Tuesday, August 18, 2020)	Christian Nodal	20	Natalia Morrokin	"I'm Every Woman"		Daniela Cortés	Advanced
Episode 33 (Monday, August 24, 2020)	Christian Nodal	1	Emilio Cámara	"Amigos con derechos"		Alex Sevilla	Eliminated
Episode 33 (Monday, August 24, 2020)	Christian Nodal	2	Sara Rubí	"Señora"		Emilio Cámara	Eliminated
Episode 33 (Monday, August 24, 2020)	Christian Nodal	3	Arnoldo Tapia	"Como yo te amo"		Sara Rubí	Advanced
Episode 33 (Monday, August 24, 2020)	Christian Nodal	4	María Renné	"I Say a Little Prayer"		Kelly Castro	Eliminated
Episode 33 (Monday, August 24, 2020)	Christian Nodal	5	Fernando Sujo	"¿Y cómo es él?"		María Reneé	Advanced
Episode 33 (Monday, August 24, 2020)	Belinda	6	Karely Esparza	"One Night Only"		Jossué González	Eliminated
Episode 33 (Monday, August 24, 2020)	Belinda	7	Scarlett Chico	"Sin Combustible"		—	Eliminated
Episode 33 (Monday, August 24, 2020)	Belinda	8	Juan Ma	"Me and Mrs. Jones"		Mario de la Garza	Advanced
Episode 33 (Monday, August 24, 2020)	Belinda	9	Mercedes de Angoitia	"Cuando Fuimos Nada"		—	Eliminated
Episode 33 (Monday, August 24, 2020)	Belinda	10	DYF	"Nunca es suficiente"		Karely Esparza	Advanced
Episode 33 (Monday, August 24, 2020)	María José	11	Irlanda González	"Quédate conmigo"		Tomás Mándel	Eliminated
Episode 33 (Monday, August 24, 2020)	María José	12	Fer Haneine	"Fuego de Noche, Nieve de Día"		—	Eliminated
Episode 33 (Monday, August 24, 2020)	María José	13	Glenda Ramírez	"Respect"		Betty Love	Advanced
Episode 33 (Monday, August 24, 2020)	María José	14	Pedro Herrera	"Matándome suavemente"		Irlanda González	Eliminated
Episode 33 (Monday, August 24, 2020)	María José	15	Majo Cornejo	"Gracias a la Vida"		Pedro Herrera	Advanced
Episode 33 (Monday, August 24, 2020)	Ricardo Montaner	16	Alonso Hernández	"Siempre es de Noche"		Mila Gaos	Advanced
Episode 33 (Monday, August 24, 2020)	Ricardo Montaner	17	Sofía Guardiola	"Todo Mi Corazón"		—	Eliminated
Episode 33 (Monday, August 24, 2020)	Ricardo Montaner	18	Las Conde	"Boogie Wonderland"		—	Eliminated
Episode 33 (Monday, August 24, 2020)	Ricardo Montaner	19	Alexis Tanguma	"No Desaparecerá"		Pao Carrasco	Advanced
Episode 33 (Monday, August 24, 2020)	Ricardo Montaner	20	Gabby Muller	"Don't You Worry 'bout a Thing"		Adria & Lluvia Acuña	Advanced

== Final phase ==
This season, the Live shows had several changes: the Quarterfinals were removed, the Semifinals were pre-recorded, but the Finale was live and the public was able to vote for the winner.

Color key:

Artist was saved by the Public's votes
Artist was saved by his/her coach
Artist was eliminated

=== Week 1: Semifinal (August 25) ===
In the Semifinal, the twelve remaining participants performed in order to become one of their coach's choice to advance into the Finale. Each coach advanced with two artists, with the third member being eliminated.

Episode 34
Order	Coach	Artist	Song	Result
1	Belinda	DYF	"Mi Gente"	Eliminated
2	Christian Nodal	Arnoldo Tapia	"Hoy Tengo Ganas de Ti"	Eliminated
3	María José	Majo Cornejo	"Recuerdo"	María's choice
4	Ricardo Montaner	Alonso Hernández	"All of Me"	Ricardo's choice
5	Belinda	Juan Ma	"Cuando Nadie me Ve"	Belinda's choice
6	Christian Nodal	Natalia Marrokin	"Duele"	Nodal's choice
7	María José	Kike Jiménez	"Rolling in the Deep"	Eliminated
8	Ricardo Montaner	Gabby Muller	"One Moment in Time"	Eliminated
9	Ricardo Montaner	Alexis Tanguma	"Desnúdate Mujer"	Ricardo's choice
10	María José	Glenda Ramírez	"With a Little Help from My Friends"	María's choice
11	Christian Nodal	Fernando Sujo	"Amar y querer"	Nodal's choice
12	Belinda	Prudence	"Call Me"	Belinda's choice

Non-competition performances
Order	Performers	Song
34.1	María José & Christian Nodal	"Adelante Corazón"
34.2	Belinda & Ricardo Montaner	"Gaia"

=== Week 2: Finale (August 31) ===
The Finale was broadcast live on August 31, and consisted of two rounds. In the first round, the participants sang a solo song, followed by team performances. After the team performance, the coach had to choose one artist to advance onto the second round. In the second round, the public then had to vote for their favorite, with results being announced at the end of the night.

==== First round ====
Episode 35
Order	Coach	Artist	Song	Result
1	Christian Nodal	Natalia Marrokin	"¿Quién eres tú?"	Eliminated
2	Christian Nodal	Fernando Sujo	"Con Ella"	Nodal's choice
3	Belinda	Juan Ma	"Perdón"	Eliminated
4	Belinda	Prudence	"Bad Romance"	Belinda's choice
5	Ricardo Montaner	Alexis Tanguma	"Algo de Mí"	Ricardo's choice
6	Ricardo Montaner	Alonso Hernández	"I'm Not the Only One"	Eliminated
7	María José	Majo Cornejo	"Volverás"	Eliminated
8	María José	Glenda Ramírez	"Rumour Has It"	María's choice

Non-competition performances
Order	Performers	Song
35.1	Christian Nodal & his team (Fernando & Natalia)	"Que Te Olvide"
35.2	Belinda & her team (Prudence & Juan Ma)	"Muriendo Lento"
35.3	Ricardo Montaner & his team (Alexis & Alonso)	"El poder de tu amor"
35.4	María José & her team (Glenda & Majo)	"Castillos"

==== Second round ====
Coach	Artist	Order	Song	Result
Belinda	Prudence	1	"Dream On"	Fourth place
Christian Nodal	Fernando Sujo	2	"Llamarada"	Winner
Ricardo Montaner	Alexis Tanguma	3	"Bailar"	Runner-up
María José	Glenda Ramírez	4	"Sola Otra Vez"	Third place

== Elimination Chart ==
=== Overall ===
Color key
Artist's info

- Team Montaner
- Team Belinda
- Team María José
- Team Nodal

Result details

- Winner
- Runner-up
- Third place
- Fourth place
- Saved by his/her coach
- Eliminated

Final Phase Results per week
Artists	Week 1 Semifinal	Week 2 Finale	
Artists	Week 1 Semifinal	Round 1	Round 2
Fernando Sujo	Safe	Safe	Winner
Alexis Tanguma	Safe	Safe	Runner-up
Glenda Ramírez	Safe	Safe	Third place
Prudence	Safe	Safe	Fourth place
Natalia Marrokin	Safe	Eliminated	Eliminated (Finale round 1)
Alonso Hernández	Safe	Eliminated	Eliminated (Finale round 1)
Majo Cornejo	Safe	Eliminated	Eliminated (Finale round 1)
Juan Ma	Safe	Eliminated	Eliminated (Finale round 1)
Arnoldo Tapia	Eliminated	Eliminated (week 1)	
Gabby Muller	Eliminated	Eliminated (week 1)	
Kike Jiménez	Eliminated	Eliminated (week 1)	
DYF	Eliminated	Eliminated (week 1)	

== Ratings ==
Show	Episode	Air date	Timeslot (CT)	Viewers (millions)
1	"Blind Auditions, Part 1"	June 2, 2020	Tuesday 7:30 p.m.	1.1
2	"Blind Auditions, Part 2"	June 3, 2020	Wednesday 7:30 p.m.	1.1
3	"Blind Auditions, Part 3"	June 8, 2020	Monday 7:30 p.m.	1.1
4	"Blind Auditions, Part 4"	June 9, 2020	Tuesday 7:30 p.m.	1.6
5	"Blind Auditions, Part 5"	June 10, 2020	Wednesday 7:30 p.m.	
6	"Blind Auditions, Part 6"	June 11, 2020	Thursday 7:30 p.m.	1.3
7	"Blind Auditions, Part 7"	June 15, 2020	Monday 7:30 p.m.	1.4
8	"Blind Auditions, Part 8"	June 16, 2020	Tuesday 7:30 p.m.	1.0
9	"Blind Auditions, Part 9"	June 17, 2020	Wednesday 7:30 p.m.	1.1
10	"Blind Auditions, Part 10"	June 18, 2020	Thursday 7:30 p.m.	1.2
11	"Blind Auditions, Part 11"	June 22, 2020	Monday 7:30 p.m.	1.1
12	"Blind Auditions, Part 12"	June 23, 2020	Tuesday 7:30 p.m.	1.2
13	"Blind Auditions, Part 13"	June 24, 2020	Wednesday 7:30 p.m.	1.2
14	"Blind Auditions, Part 14"	June 25, 2020	Thursday 7:30 p.m.	1.3
15	"Blind Auditions, Part 15"	June 29, 2020	Monday 7:30 p.m.	1.2
16	"Blind Auditions, Part 16"	June 30, 2020	Tuesday 7:30 p.m.	1.2
17	"Blind Auditions, Part 17"	July 1, 2020	Wednesday 7:30 p.m.	1.2
18	"Blind Auditions, Part 18"	July 2, 2020	Thursday 7:30 p.m.	1.4
19	"Blind Auditions, Part 19"	July 6, 2020	Monday 7:30 p.m.	1.2
20	"Blind Auditions, Part 20"	July 7, 2020	Tuesday 7:30 p.m.	1.3
21	"The Knockouts, Part 1"	July 13, 2020	Monday 7:30 p.m.	1.3
22	"The Knockouts, Part 2"	July 14, 2020	Tuesday 7:30 p.m.	1.4
23	"The Knockouts, Part 3"	July 20, 2020	Monday 7:30 p.m.	1.2
24	"The Knockouts, Part 5"	July 21, 2020	Tuesday 7:30 p.m.	1.2
25	"The Knockouts, Part 5"	July 27, 2020	Monday 7:30 p.m.	1.2
26	"The Knockouts, Part 6"	July 28, 2020	Tuesday 7:30 p.m.	1.2
27	"The Knockouts, Part 7"	August 3, 2020	Monday 7:30 p.m.	
28	"The Battles, Part 1"	August 4, 2020	Tuesday 7:30 p.m.	1.2
29	"The Battles, Part 2"	August 10, 2020	Monday 7:30 p.m.	1.4
30	"The Battles, Part 3"	August 11, 2020	Tuesday 7:30 p.m.	1.1
31	"The Battles, Part 4"	August 17, 2020	Monday 7:30 p.m.	1.6
32	"Top 3, Part 1"	August 18, 2020	Tuesday 7:30 p.m.	1.2
33	"Top 3, Part 2"	August 24, 2020	Monday 7:30 p.m.	1.3
34	"Semifinal"	August 25, 2020	Tuesday 7:30 p.m.	1.4
35	"Finale"	August 31, 2020	Monday 7:30 p.m.	1.6

== Artists who appeared on other shows or in previous seasons ==
- Ángel Moré, Anilú Dávila, Kelly Castro (as Hidekel Castro), Aranda Brizelly and Montse Bernal participated in the eight season. They were eliminated by not turning any chairs
- Nicholas Thomas Griffin participated in the eight season in Lupillo Rivera's team
- Alonso Hernández participated in the second season in Paulina Rubio's team
- Josafat Silva (of Josafat and Imanol) participated in the second season of "Pequeños Gigantes"
- Karely Esparza participated in the fourth season in Julión Álvarez's team
- Daniela Pedali participated in the fourth season in Ricky Martin's team, later stolen by Julión Álvarez
- Damiana Conde from "Las Conde" participated in the first and sixth seasons in the teams of Alejandro Sanz and Yuri respectively. Damiana is the first participant of the format in Mexico to have participated on three different occasions.
- Karina Esparza participated in the fourth season. She was eliminated by not flipping any chairs.
- Fabiola Jaramillo participated in the seventh season of La Academia
- Eddy Peña participated in the fifth season (in a duet with Jairo Calderón) in the Los Tigres del Norte's team
- Arnoldo Tapia participated in the Mexican reality show La Apuesta in David Bisbal's team and in the fifth season, being eliminated by not turning any chair
- Abner Medina was a participant in the Mexican reality show La Apuesta in Pepe Aguilar's team
- Sebastián Miranda participated in the sixth season (in a duet with Tyrone Díaz) in Maluma's team
- Kike Jiménez was the runner-up in the fourth season in Laura Pausini's team
- Nain Jurado participated in the third season, being eliminated by not turning any chairs
- Vanessa Payán was a participant in the Mexican reality show La Apuesta as "Payán" in David Bisbal's team
- Antonio Ramírez participated in the second season of "Pequeños Gigantes" as "Toñito Ramírez"
- Marco Silva from "Vivozes" participated in the fourth generation of La Academia
