= La Cima del Cielo =

Single by Ricardo Montaner

from the album Un Toque de Misterio
- Released: 1989
- Recorded: 1989
- Studio: New Rever Studios (Fort Lauderdale, FL, U.S.A.)
- Genre: Latin pop · latin ballad
- Length: 4:26
- Label: TH-Rodven
- Songwriter: Ricardo Montaner · Pablo Manavello
- Producer: Pablo Manavello

Ricardo Montaner singles chronology
"Debo Cambiar de Amor" (1989)	"La Cima del Cielo" (1989)	"Me Va a Extrañar" (1990)

"La Cima del Cielo" (English: The Highest Point of the Sky) is a song performed by Venezuelan singer-songwriter Ricardo Montaner. It was written by Montaner and co-written and produced by Pablo Manavello and released in late 1989 as the lead single from his third studio album Un Toque de Misterio (1989). The song became the first number-one single for the singer in the Billboard Top Latin Songs chart in January 1990.

The song was re-recorded by Montaner in 1999 with a new musical arrangement, and it was included on the setlist of his album Ricardo Montaner con la London Metropolitan Orchestra which was produced by Bebu Silvetti. Also a Portuguese version was recorded by the singer in 2004.

== Background ==
Ricardo Montaner began his recording career in the late 1970s, independently recording an album titled Mares (1978). In 1983, he released Cada Día, his first album for Venezuela's largest record label, Rodven Records, and only enjoyed limited success in Venezuela. The following recordings, Ricardo Montaner (1986) and Ricardo Montaner, Vol. 2 (1988), were quite successful and established him as a popular artist.

The former album includes a pair of telenovela opening themes, "Vamos a Dejarlo" (which was used in Esa Muchacha de Ojos Café) and "Yo Que Te Amé" (for the soap opera Enamorada), while the latter album was his international breakthrough, with singles like "Tan Enamorados", "A Donde Va el Amor" and "Sólo con un Beso", that became Billboard Top Latin Songs top ten hits. He also recorded "Tu Piano y Mi Guitarra" a duet with Alejandro Lerner, and made an impact in countries such as Mexico, Colombia, United States and Latin America. Montaner continued his career with Un Toque de Misterio released in 1989, an album that included his first number-one hit in the Americal Latin charts, "La Cima del Cielo".

== Chart performance ==
The song debuted on the Billboard Top Latin Songs chart (formerly Hot Latin Tracks) at number 29 on 25 November 1989 and climbed to the top ten three weeks later. It reached the top position of the chart on 27 January 1990 for two weeks. It replaced "Cómo Fuí a Enamorarme de Tí" by Mexican band Los Bukis and succeeded by Kaoma with "Lambada". The song spent 28 weeks within the Top 40 and became the fifth top ten single for the singer in the chart, and first number-one hit.
