= Un Tributo (a José José) =

Studio album by Various
- Released: November 10, 1998 (Mexico)
- Recorded: Mexico
- Genres: Latin rock, Latin Alternative, Mexican rock
- Label: RCA
- Producers: Michael Brook, Jorge Mondragon, Café Tacuba, Azul Violeta

Un Tributo (a José José) (English A tribute to José José) is a 1998 tribute album to Mexican singer José José.

Paying homage to José José for his influence on Latin pop music, the album was recorded by several popular Latin artists of different musical genres such as Molotov, Cafe Tacuba, Julieta Venegas, Moenia, Beto Cuevas, and La Mafia.

The main hits of the album were: "Lo que no fue, no será" by El Gran Silencio, "Una mañana" by Cafe Tacuba, "Lo pasado, pasado" by Maldita Vecindad, "Gavilán o paloma" by La Lupita and "Volcán" by Moenia (the last two released video clip aired on MTV). Cafe Tacuba performed the song "Una mañana" on their MTV Unplugged in 1995.

The album started a trend of Latin rock bands and hip hop artists recording old songs from music icons such as Juan Gabriel and Sandro de América, as an homage. In 2013, another album was released titled Un Tributo (a José José) 2.

== Tracks ==
1. "Lo pasado, pasado" — Maldita Vecindad - 3:20
  - Originally released on Lo Pasado, Pasado.
2. "El Triste" — Julieta Venegas - 4:18
  - Originally released on El Triste (album).
3. "Payaso" — Molotov - 3:49
  - Originally released on Reflexiones.
4. "Gavilán o paloma" — La Lupita - 3:55
  - Originally released on Reencuentro.
5. "La nave del olvido" — Beto Cuevas - 4:40
  - Originally released on La Nave del Olvido.
6. "Me basta" — Poncho Kingz - 4:22
  - Originally released on Gracias.
7. "Volcán" — Moenia - 4:41
  - Originally released on Volcán.
8. "Amnesia" — Control Machete - 4:56
  - Originally released on En las Buenas... y en las Malas.
9. "Preso" — Aleks Syntek - 4:51
  - Originally released on Gracias.
10. "Amar y querer" — Azul Violeta - 6:18
  - Originally released on Reencuentro.
11. "Una Mañana" — Cafe Tacuba - 3:01
  - Originally released on Cuidado.
12. "Si me dejas ahora" — Leonardo de Lozanne - 4:41
  - Originally released on Si Me Dejas Ahora.
13. "Lagrimas" — Pastilla - 3:54
  - Originally released on Secretos.
14. "Lo dudo" — Jumbo - 5:00
  - Originally released on Secretos.
15. "Lo que no fue, no será" — El Gran Silencio - 5:14
  - Originally released on Lo Pasado, Pasado.

== Personnel ==
- Rubén Albarrán - Art Direction, Artwork, Design
- Carlos Arredondo - Engineer, Mixing
- Armando Ávila - Arranger, Mixing, Recording
- Azul Violeta - Co-producer
- Jose Barbosa - Engineer, Mixing
- Craig Brock - Engineer, Mixing
- Michael Brook - Producer
- John Caban - Guitar
- Café Tacuba - Co-Producer
- Arnulfo Canales - Guitar (Acoustic)
- Carlos Castro - Bass
- Joe Chiccarelli - Mixing
- Rodolfo Cruz - Engineer
- Beto Cuevas - Co-Producer
- David Dachinger - Keyboards, Mixing, Percussion, Programming, Vocals (Background)
- Gerardo Garza - Engineer, Producer, Vocals (Background)
- Rogelio Gómez - Engineer
- Señor González - Percussion
- Didi Gutman - Guitar, Keyboards, Producer, Programming
- Ricardo Haas - Engineer, Mixing, Producer
- Alvaro Henriquez - Guitar, Producer
- Antonio Hernandez - Engineer, Mixing, Producer
- Edgar Hernandez - Engineer
- Diego Herrera - Producer
- Jorge 'Chiquis' Amaro - Producer
- Cachorro López - Producer
- Oscar Lopez - Producer
- Ernesto F. Martinez - Bass
- Román Martínez - Art Direction, Design
- Moenia - Synthesizer
- Jorge Mondragon - Executive Producer
- Carlos Murguía - Piano
- Uriel Natenzon - Bass
- Poncho Kingz - Co-Producer
- Luis Román - Engineer
- Noel Savón - Percussion
- Sebastián Schon - Engineer, Guitar, Keyboards, Programming
- La Mafia - Co-producer
- Rodolfo Vazquez - Engineer
- Joe Zook - Mixing

== Sequel ==
After almost fifteen years since its release, in November 2013, a follow-up to "Volcán: Tributo a José José" was released under the title "Un Tributo 2", featuring performers such as Natalia Lafourcade, Moderatto, Los Claxons, Carla Morrison and Panteón Rococó.
