= List of awards and nominations received by José José =

José José awards and nominations
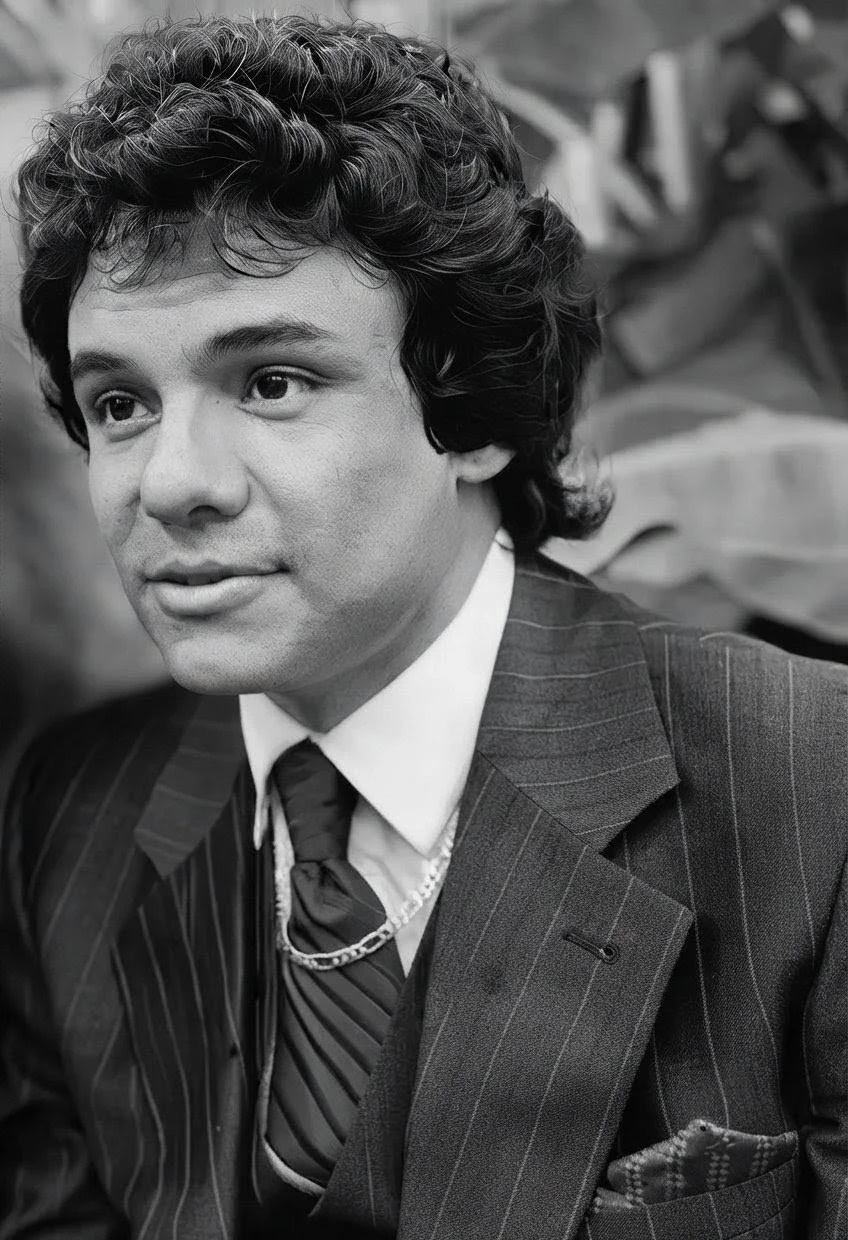
- José José in 1970
Awards and nominations
Award	Wins	Nominations
Association of Latin Entertainment Critics	14	16
Billboard Number-One Awards	7	10
Billboard Latin Music Awards	1	1
Grammy Awards	0	9
Lo Nuestro Awards	2	4
The Recording Academy	2	2
TVyNovelas Awards	1	1

Totals (Note: Certain award groups do not simply award one winner. They acknowledge several different recipients, have runners-up, and have third place. Since this is a specific recognition and is different from losing an award, runner-up mentions are considered wins in this award tally. For simplification and to avoid errors, each award in this list has been presumed to have had a prior nomination.)
- Wins: 83
- Nominations: 100

José José (1948-2019) was a Mexican singer and actor, recipient of multiple awards through his career spanning five decades, and posthumously. Nicknamed the "Prince of Song", he is one of the best-selling Latino singers of all-time with estimated record sales of over 40 million.

José José first gained recognition after having participated in the 1970 edition for the Festival Mundial de la Canción Latina, in which he earned the third place. Soon after, he received accolades from major national awards and abroad, including El Heraldo de México Awards, and Disco de Oro de Hollywood from Los Angeles, United States. During this decade, he received various Discometro which recognized record sales in Mexico, called by Billboard as the "Mexican Grammys". Through his career, he achieved nominations and awards from other majors associations, including nine nominations from the Grammy Awards (all of them for Best Latin Pop Album), as well Lo Nuestro Awards, and various Latin ACE from the Association of Latin Entertainment Critics and Billboard Number-One Awards. In addition, his career was recognized at various ceremony awards, including a Latin Grammy Lifetime Achievement Award in 2004, a Billboard Latin Achievement in 2013, and the Living Legend Award by the Latin Songwriters Hall of Fame in 2019.

Outside of his work in music, José José received awards for his acting career, most notoriously for his role in La fea más bella winning the TVyNovelas Award for Best Supporting Actor in 2007. He was admitted into various hall and walk of fames, including Plaza de las Estrellas (Mexico), the Billboard Latin Music Hall of Fame, Hollywood Walk of Fame and Las Vegas Walk of Stars. He also received honors outside of the music industry, including an estimated 16 keys to the city between United States and Mexico. In 1984, José José was condecorated by then Mexican president Miguel de la Madrid ahead of his mainstream success with his album Secretos (1983).

== Awards and nominations ==
Award/organization (Note: Charts are not included, unless they are explicitly described as "awards" or specific trophies are given.)	Year	Nominee/work	Category	Result	Ref.
Academia Mexicana del Entretenimiento Popular (AMEP) (Premios Grandes)	2015	José José	Icon of Romantic Genre	Honoree	
Asociación de Hispanos (Nosotros)	2003	José José	Golden Eagle Award	Honoree	
Asociación Internacional de Poetas y Escritores Hispanos (AIPEH)	2009	José José	Pluma de Oro (Golden Feather Award)	Won	
Asociación Internacional de Periodistas de Radio, Prensa y Televisión de Las Vegas	2007	José José	Maximum Hispanic Pride	Honoree	
Asociación Internacional de Periodistas de Radio, Prensa y Televisión de Las Vegas	2007	José José	Keys to the City, Las Vegas	Honoree	
Asociación Nacional de Actores (Anda)	2014	José José	Pedro Infante Medal	Honoree	
Association of Latin Entertainment Critics (Latin ACE, New York)	1978	José José	Best Male Singer	Nominated	
Association of Latin Entertainment Critics (Latin ACE, New York)	1982	José José	Best Male Singer	Nominated	
Association of Latin Entertainment Critics (Latin ACE, New York)	1984	José José	Most Outstanding Male Singer ("Voy a Llenarte Toda")	Won	
Association of Latin Entertainment Critics (Latin ACE, New York)	1984	Secretos	Album of the Year	Won	
Association of Latin Entertainment Critics (Latin ACE, New York)	1985	José José	TV Special of the Year	Won	
Association of Latin Entertainment Critics (Latin ACE, New York)	1985	José José	International Artist of the Year	Won	
Association of Latin Entertainment Critics (Latin ACE, New York)	1986	José José	Most Outstanding Male Singer ("¿Y Qué?")	Won	
Association of Latin Entertainment Critics (Latin ACE, New York)	1986	José José	International Artist of the Year	Won	
Association of Latin Entertainment Critics (Latin ACE, New York)	1986	Reflexiones	Album of the Year	Won	
Association of Latin Entertainment Critics (Latin ACE, New York)	1987	José José	Most Outstanding Performer of Regional Rhythms ("Dos Amores")	Won	
Association of Latin Entertainment Critics (Latin ACE, New York)	1987	José José	Most Popular Concert (at Radio City Music Hall)	Won	
Association of Latin Entertainment Critics (Latin ACE, New York)	1989	José José	Male Singer of the Year	Won	
Association of Latin Entertainment Critics (Latin ACE, New York)	1991	José José	ACE Extraordinary Award for Distinction and Merit	Honoree	
Association of Latin Entertainment Critics (Latin ACE, New York)	1995	José José	Lifetime Award	Honoree	
Association of Latin Entertainment Critics (Latin ACE, New York)	1999	José José	Voices of the Millennium Award	Honoree	
Association of Latin Entertainment Critics (Latin ACE, New York)	2000	José José	Voices of the Millennium Award	Honoree	
Billboard Latin Music Awards	2013	José José	Lifetime Achievement Awards	Honoree	
Billboard Tanqueray Sterling Music Video Awards	1990	José José	Latin category	Won	
Billboard Number One Awards (Note: Prior to the inauguration of the Billboard Music Awards in 1990, the magazine had the "Number One Awards" to honor the top-performing artists of the year on each of chart categories.)	1986	José José	Top Pop Latin Artists	Won	
Billboard Number One Awards	1986	Promesas	Top Pop Latin Albums	Won	
Billboard Number One Awards	1987	José José	Top Pop Latin Artists	Won	
Billboard Number One Awards	1987	Siempre Contigo	Top Pop Latin Albums	Won	
Billboard Number One Awards	1987	"Y Quién Puede Ser"	Top Hot Latin Tracks	Nominated	
Billboard Number One Awards	1988	José José	Top Pop Latin Artists	Won	
Billboard Number One Awards	1988	Soy Así	Top Pop Latin Albums	Won	
Billboard Number One Awards	1988	"Soy Así"	Top Hot Latin Tracks	Nominated	
Billboard Number One Awards	1989	José José	Top Pop Latin Artists	Won	
Billboard Number One Awards	1989	"Como Tú"	Top Hot Latin Tracks	Nominated	
Brownsville Chamber of Commerce	1985	José José	Mr. Amigo of 1984 (Note: Mr. Amigo, a collaborative effort by cities of Brownsvile, Texas, and Matamoros, Tamaulipas established in 1964 to honor Mexican figures in sports, politics, business, cultural and arts)	Honoree	
Calendario Azteca de Oro (Note: transl. Aztec Gold Calendar, an award given by the Asociación Mexicana de Periodistas de Radio y Televisión (AMPRyT))	1977	José José	Intérprete génerico	Nominated	
Calendario Azteca de Oro	1979	José José	Intérprete génerico	Won	
Calendario Azteca de Oro	1980	José José	Best Mexican Romantic-Ballad Singer	Won	
Calendario Azteca de Oro	1982	José José		Won	
Casandra Awards (a.k.a. Soberano Awards)	1996	José José	Casandra International	Honoree	
Desi Entertainment Awards	1992	José José	Lifetime Award	Honoree	
Desi Entertainment Awards	1992	José José	Special Award	Honoree	
Diosas de Plata	2017	José José	Lifetime Award	Honoree	
Discometro (Note: According to Billboard, an award given by music retailer Mercado de Discos to best-sellers in Mexico. It was called the "Mexican Grammys" by the publication in 1976.)	1970	José José	Sales Awards (Note: A trophy given by sales.)	Won	
Discometro	1971	José José	Sales Awards	Won	
Discometro	1974	José José	Sales Awards	Won	
Discometro	1975	José José	Sales Awards	Won	
Discometro	1976	José José	Sales Awards	Won	
Disco de Oro de Hollywood (Note: An award celebrated in Los Angeles, and organized by music producer Antonio de Marco and Alfredo Garcia according to La Opinión.)	1970	José José	Winning-Artists	Won	
Disco de Oro de Hollywood	1972	José José	Winning-Artists	Nominated	
Disco de Oro de Hollywood	1973	José José	Winning-Artists	Nominated	
Disco de Oro de Hollywood	1976	José José	Winning-Artists	Won	
Disco de Oro de Hollywood	1977	José José	Winning-Artists	Won	
El Heraldo de México Awards	1970	José José	Voice of El Heraldo	Won	
El Heraldo de México Awards	1971	José José	Revelation of the Year	Won	
El Heraldo de México Awards	1985	José José	Artist of the Year (1984)	Won	
El Heraldo de México Awards	1985	José José	Best Show	Won	
El Heraldo de México Awards	1995	José José	Lifetime Award	Honoree	
El Patio	1993	José José	Special award for his performance	Honoree	
Festival Mundial de la Canción Latina	1970	José José	Contest Award	3rd place	
Fundación Agustín Lara	2014	José José	Medal Agustín Lara	Honoree	
Fundación Agustín Lara	2014	José José	Lifetime Award: 50 Years	Honoree	
Grammy Awards	1985	Secretos	Best Latin Pop Album	Nominated	
Grammy Awards	1986	Reflexiones	Best Latin Pop Album	Nominated	
Grammy Awards	1986	Por Ella	Best Latin Pop Album	Nominated	
Grammy Awards	1987	"Pruebame"	Best Latin Pop Album	Nominated	
Grammy Awards	1988	Siempre Contigo	Best Latin Pop Album	Nominated	
Grammy Awards	1989	Soy Así	Best Latin Pop Album	Nominated	
Hispanic Heritage Society	2002	José José	Tito Guízar Award (Note: An award established in San Antonio, Texas by Sociedad de la Herencia Hispana (Hispanic Heritage Society).)	Honoree	
KLVE	1995	José José	Ovación Award	Honoree	
Latinos de Hoy Awards (Note: An award given by Hoy, Los Angeles Times and the organization OneLegacy, also known as Premios Hoy.)	2013	José José	Special Achievement in Music: 50 Years	Honoree	
Latin Songwriters Hall of Fame	2019	José José	Living Legend Award	Honoree	
Lo Nuestro Awards	1989	José José	Pop Male Artist of the Year	Won	
Lo Nuestro Awards	1989	Soy Así	Pop Album of the Year	Nominated	
Lo Nuestro Awards	1990	"Como Tú"	Pop Song of the Year	Nominated	
Lo Nuestro Awards	1996	"Llora Corazón"	Pop Song of the Year	Nominated	
Lo Nuestro Awards	2002	José José	Excellence Award	Honoree	
Mexican American Legal Defense and Educational Fund	2010	José José	Leadership in the Arts	Honoree	
Orgullosamente Latino Awards		José José	Lifetime Award	Honoree	
Pan American Health Organization	2008	José José	Health Champion (Campeón de la Salud)	Honoree	
Premios Juventud	2004	José José	Idol of Generations Award	Honoree	
Ronda Awards	1985	José José	Most Popular Foreign Singer	Won	
Stereo Joya	2014	José José	Lifetime Awards: 50 Years	Honoree	
TVyNovelas Awards	2007	José José (La fea más bella)	Best Supporting Actor	Won	
The Latin Recording Academy	2004	José José	Lifetime Achievement Awards	Honoree	
The Latin Recording Academy	2005	José José	Person of the Year	Honoree	

== Other honors ==
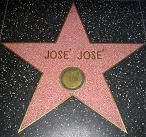
José José's Hollywood Walk of Fame

List of State/Government Honors
Year	Description	Status	Ref.
1984	Medal from Mexican president, Miguel de la Madrid	Honoree	
2011	Keys to the City (Mexicali, Mexico)	Honoree	
2013	Keys to the City (Puerto Vallarta, Mexico)	Honoree	
2015	Distinguished Visitor of Puebla, Mexico	Honoree	
2015	Lifetime Award from Congress of Mexico City (Note: An award given by the Congress of Mexico City, along with various LGBT associations recognizing his support for the community)	Honoree	

List of hall/walk of fames
Year	Award	Status	Ref.
c. 1995	Plaza de las Estrellas (Mexico)	Honoree	
1997	Billboard Latin Music Hall of Fame	Honoree	
2002	International Latin Music Hall of Fame	Honoree	
2004	Hollywood Walk of Fame	Honoree	
2008	Las Vegas Walk of Stars	Honoree	
2008	Latin Walk of Fame (Los Angeles)	Honoree	
2014	Tijuana Walk of Stars	Honoree	
2015	Walk of Fame (Cuernavaca)	Honoree	
2017	Hall of Fame (Pachuca, Mexico)	Honoree	
