= Soy Así (song) =

Single by José José

from the album Soy Así
- Released: 1987
- Recorded: 1986–1987; Take One Studios; Mad Hatter Studios; O'Henry and Arison Studios (Los Angeles, California)
- Genre: Latin
- Length: 3:30
- Label: RCA Ariola
- Songwriter: Rafael Pérez-Botija
- Producer: Rafael Pérez-Botija

José José singles chronology
"Sin Saber" (1987)	"Soy Así" (1987)	"Mi Hembra" (1988)

"Soy Así" ("I Am Like This") is a ballad written and produced by Spanish composer Rafael Pérez-Botija and performed by Mexican singer José José. It was released as the first single from his twenty fourth studio album of the same title (1987). This song became the second number-one single by the artist in the Billboard Hot Latin Tracks chart, after the single "¿Y Quién Puede Ser?" two years before. In 2005, Mexican singer Valentín Elizalde recorded a cover version of the single and included it on his album of the same name.

== Background ==
"Soy Así" was written and produced by Rafael Pérez-Botija, who worked previously with José José on the albums Volcán (1978), Si Me Dejas Ahora (1979), Amor, Amor (1980), Gracias (1981), Mi Vida (1982), Reflexiones (1984), and Promesas (1985). José José told magazine Selecciones that during 1985 to 1987, he had a personal crisis because "my life was going on airplanes, trucks, locked in a hotel room." His daughter was born in 1982 and that more or less balanced his marriage, but after a while he divorced his then wife. In the same year, he also finished his work relation with his manager, who also was his brother in law. During this events, and his on-going battle with alcoholism, José José recorded his album Soy Así.

== Chart performance and cover versions ==
The song debuted on the Billboard Hot Latin Tracks chart at number 22 on November 28, 1987 and climbed to the top ten two weeks later. It reached the top position of the chart on January 16, 1988, replacing "Y Tú También Llorarás" by Venezuelan singer José Luis Rodríguez "El Puma" and being replaced one week later by Ana Gabriel's "Ay Amor". "Soy Así" ranked at number seven in the Hot Latin Tracks Year-End Chart of 1988.

"Soy Así" has been recorded by several performers, including Valentín Elizalde who released it as a single from his album of the same title in 2005, peaking at number 28 in the Billboard Latin Regional Mexican Airplay. Elefante, Juan Garza, Banda Horoscopos and Alamenos de la Sierra also recorded their own version of the track.

=== Charts ===
Chart (1988)	Peak position
US Billboard Hot Latin Tracks	1
