= Romántico =

Romántico may refer to:

== Albums ==
- Romántico (José José album), 1981
- Romantico (Kamikazee album), 2012
- Romantico, by Aiello, 2023
- Romántico, by Gilberto Santa Rosa, 2000
- Romántico, by Los Ángeles de Charly, 2019
- El Romántico, by José Manuel Calderón, 1974

== Other uses ==
- Romántico (film), a 2005 American documentary directed by Mark Becker
- Romántico (horse) (1935–1957), a South American Thoroughbred racehorse
