= José José =

Mexican singer (1948–2019)

- José José in 1970
- Born: José Rómulo Sosa Ortiz; 17 February 1948; Clavería, Azcapotzalco, Mexico City, Mexico
- Died: 28 September 2019 (aged 71); Homestead, Florida, U.S.
- Resting place: Panteón Francés de San Joaquín, Mexico City
- Other name: El Príncipe de la Canción
- Occupations: Singer; actor
- Years active: 1963–2012
- Spouses: Natalia Herrera Calles (m. 1970; div. 1975) Anel (m. 1976; div. 1991) Sara Salazar (m. 1995)
- Children: 3
- Awards: Full list
- Musical career
- Genres: Latin ballad; bolero; bossa nova; jazz
- Instrument: Vocals
- Labels: RCA Victor; Ariola Records; Sony BMG

José Rómulo Sosa Ortiz (17 February 1948 – 28 September 2019), known professionally as José José (Spanish pronunciation: [xoˈse xoˈse]) was a Mexican singer and actor. Dubbed as "El Príncipe de la Canción" ("the Prince of Song"), his performance and vocal style have influenced many Latin pop artists in a career that spanned more than four decades. Due to his vocals and popularity, José José was considered by Latin audiences and media as an icon of Latin pop music and one of the most emblematic Latin singers of his time.

Born into a family of musicians, José began his musical career in his early teens playing guitar and singing in serenade. He later joined a jazz and bossa nova trio where he sang and played bass and double bass. José José found success as a solo artist in the early 1970s. Demonstrating his tenor vocal ability with a stunning performance of the song "El Triste" at a Latin music festival held in Mexico City in 1970, he climbed the Latin charts during that decade. Having achieved recognition as a balladeer, his singing garnered universal critical acclaim from musical peers and media.

In the 1980s, after signing with Ariola Records, José rose to international prominence as one of the most popular and talented Latin performers. His 1983 album Secretos has sold over four million units. With many international hits, he received several Grammy nominations, sold more than 40 million albums and was once courted by music legend Frank Sinatra, who wanted to win him for his own label. He sold out in venues such as Madison Square Garden and Radio City Music Hall. His music reached non-Spanish-speaking countries in Europe and Asia. He forged a career as an actor, starring in movies such as Gavilán o Paloma (1985) and Perdóname Todo (1995).

== Life and career ==
=== 1948–1962: Childhood ===
José Rómulo Sosa Ortiz was born on 17 February 1948 in Clavería, Azcapotzalco, Mexico City. His father, José Sosa Esquivel, was an operatic tenor (tenor comprimario) and his mother, Margarita Ortiz, was a classical pianist. When José showed interest in singing, they tried to discourage him claiming that it was too difficult to be successful in show business. In that time, his reportedly alcoholic father abandoned the family forcing José to work to help his mother and younger brother.

=== 1963–1969: Early career ===
At the age of fifteen, his mother gave him his first piano. Besides working in his teens, he learned to play guitar and sang in the church and in serenades along with his neighborhood friends for extra money.

In 1967, at the age of 19, José formed Los Peg, a Mexican band of bossa nova/jazz. Although they made several recordings as a group, they did not reach commercial success. In 1965, under the name of "Pepe Sosa" and pursuing a solo career encouraged by his mother, he recorded the singles "Ma vie" and "El Mundo", which did not sell well either. He made a career breakthrough when he was invited to perform a song for a friend's sister on her birthday. His friend's sister was the executive secretary for the managing director of Orfeón Records. He took a new performing name after this, joining his first name "José" with his father's first name (also José), who had died of alcoholism. He signed a contract with RCA Victor and recorded his first album: José José (also known as Cuidado). The album featured songs by Rubén Fuentes and Armando Manzanero. It was arranged by his former teacher Mario Patrón, who was considered the best jazz musician of Mexico, and employed Brazilian percussionist Mayuto Correa, who was in Mexico City playing with bossa nova stars João Gilberto, Carlos Lyra, Leny Andrade, and Tamba Trio. The album's sound is a combination of boleros and romantic ballads with a jazz and bossa nova influence.

=== 1970–1980: "El Triste", consolidation and Ariola Records ===
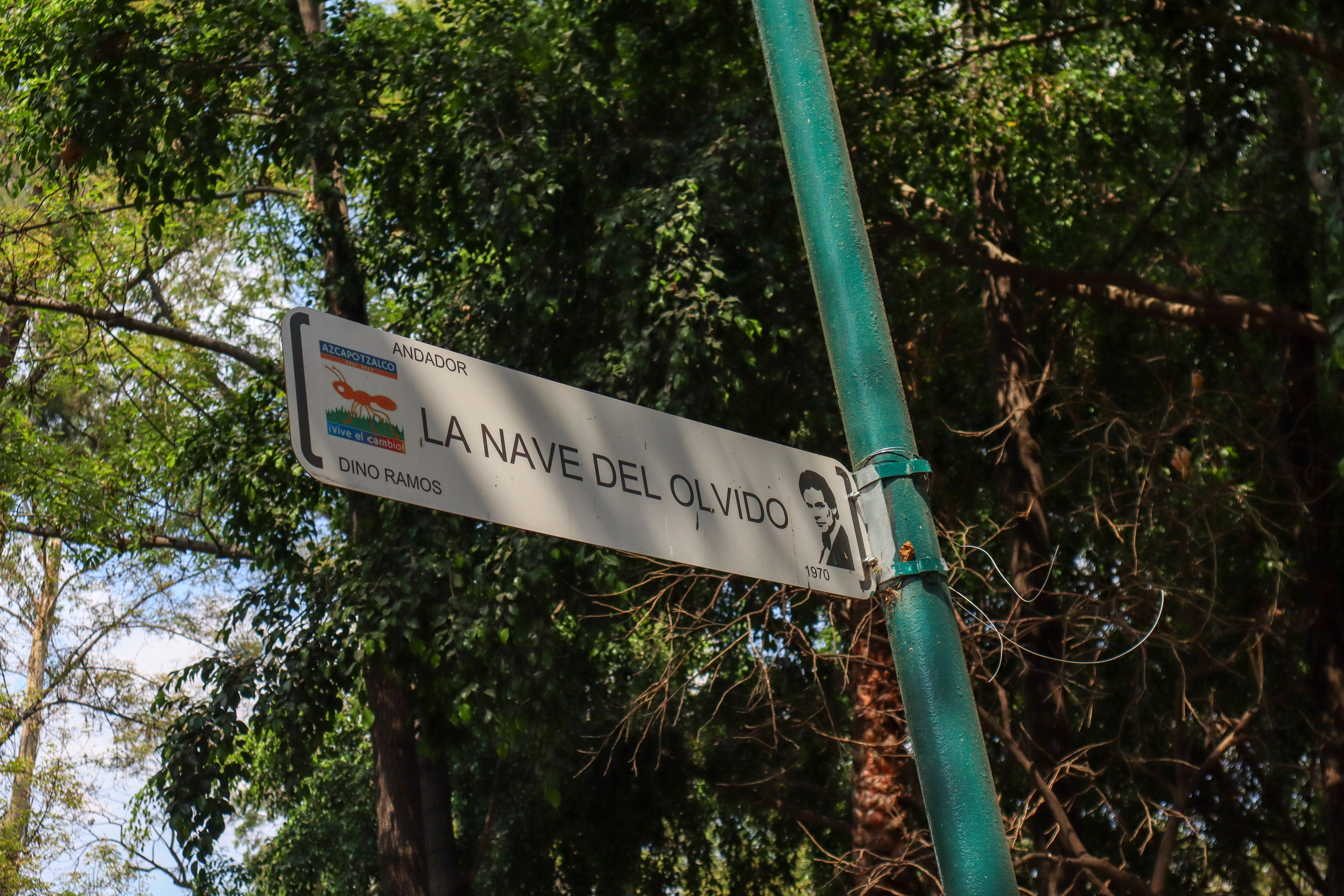
Signage at the Clavería neighborhood in Azcapotzalco with the name of his song "La nave del olvido", photographed in 2025

In early 1970 he released the song "La nave del olvido" which became his first big hit in Mexico and Latin America, and recorded his second album: La Nave Del Olvido. José's big break came on 15 March 1970, when he represented Mexico in the international song festival the II Festival de la Canción Latina (Latin Song Festival II, predecessor of the OTI Festival) with a performance of the song "El Triste". Although José José finished in third place, his performance helped launch his music career to a wider audience.

José José had several major hits in the 1970s including "De Pueblo en Pueblo", "Hasta Que Vuelvas", "Déjame Conocerte", "Sentimientos", "Paloma", and "Gavilan o Paloma". One song which was played on the radio, "El Príncipe" ("The Prince"), earned the artist the title "El Príncipe de la Canción" ("The Prince of Songs") from a DJ.

In 1973, Frank Sinatra listened to José's music at Reprise Records and invited him to record a duet and a full album under Sinatra's label. The collaboration was impossible due to José's exclusivity agreement with his label.

In 1976, José signed with Ariola Records with Reencuentro being the first albums to be released under the label a year later.

=== 1980–1989: International stardom, Secretos and Mexico's top singer ===
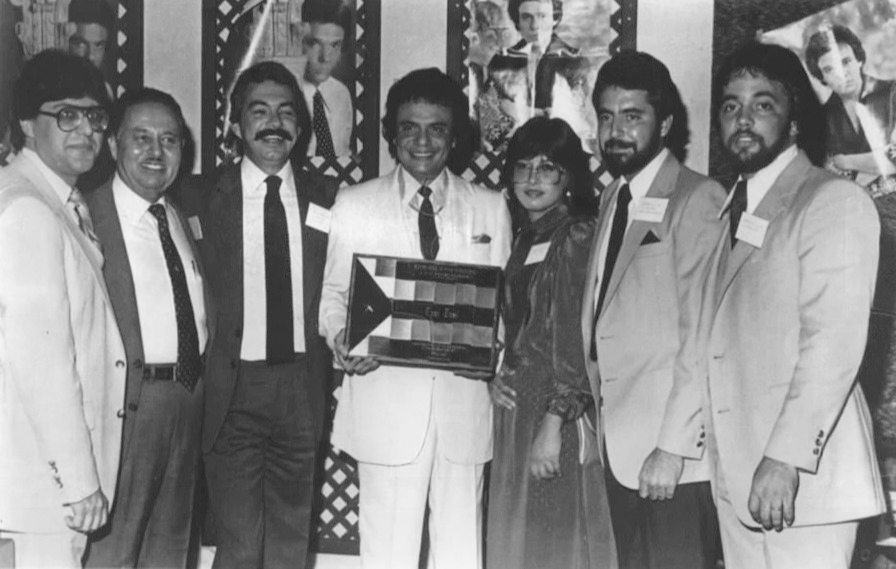
José José receiving an award in the United States in 1982

José José released several successful albums including Amor Amor (1980), Romántico (1981), Gracias (1981), Mi Vida. Amor Amor sold over 1.5 million copies in Latin America. He recorded a Spanish version of the hit "New York, New York", as a tribute to his friend Frank Sinatra.

In 1983, José José released Secretos, in which he collaborated with Manuel Alejandro for the album's compositions. "Lo Dudo" ("I Doubt It") and "El Amor Acaba" ("The Love is Over") were major hits from the album and Secretos became the best selling recording in his career with four million copies sold. Secretos was nominated for Best Latin Pop Performance in the Grammy Awards of 1985. Following the release of Secretos, José continued his international success. He released Reflexiones in 1984. The album was written, produced and arranged by Rafael Pérez-Botija and sold over 2 million copies worldwide. Reflexiones became the first album to reach number one on the Billboard Latin Pop Albums in the United States upon its establishment in 1985, and was also nominated for Best Latin Pop Performance in the 1986 Grammy Awards.

In 1985, José José collaborated with performers such as Plácido Domingo, Julio Iglesias, Roberto Carlos, José Luis Rodríguez "El Puma", Pedro Vargas and Vicente Fernández for the charity single, "Cantaré, cantarás". He also performed a duet with Puerto Rican singer José Feliciano on the song "Por Ella" ("For Her") on Feliciano's album Ya Soy Tuyo (1985) which was also nominated in the same category on the 1986 Grammy Awards. The same year, José starred in his autobiographic film Gavilán o Paloma, alongside Christian Bach and the comedian Jorge Ortiz de Pinedo. The following, he released the album Promesas, written, produced and arranged by Pérez-Botija. Its main hits were "Amantes", "Me vas a echar de menos", "Más", and "Tú me estás volviendo loco". One of the album's singles, "Pruébame", was nominated for Best Latin Pop Performance at the 1987 Grammy Awards. Promesas became his second number-one album on the Billboard Latin Pop Albums. On his next album Siempre Contigo in 1986 he worked with the Spanish producer and guitarist Paco Cepero. The album produced three singles: "¿Y Quién Puede Ser?", "Corre y Ve Con Él", and "Sin Saber". The former track became his first number-one song on the Billboard Hot Latin Songs chart in the United States. It was nominated for Best Latin Pop Performance in the Grammy Awards of 1988 and became his third number-one album on the Billboard Latin Pop Albums chart.

José José told magazine Selecciones that during 1985 to 1987, he had a personal crisis because "my life was going on airplanes, trucks, locked in a hotel room." His daughter was born in 1982 and that more or less balanced his marriage, but after a while he divorced his then wife. In the same year, he also finished his work relation with his manager, who also was his brother in law. During this events, and his on-going battle with alcoholism, José José recorded his album Soy Así; it became his fourth number-one album on the Latin Pop Albums chart. The album included four singles: the title track (became his second number-one song on the Hot Latin Songs chart), "Mi Hembra", "Salúdamela Mucho", and "Vergüenza Me Da Quererte". Soy Así was nominated for Best Latin Pop Performance in the 1989 Grammy Awards. It was also nominated for Pop Album of the Year at the 1st Annual Lo Nuestro Awards in the same year while José José was awarded Pop Male Artist of the Year.

José José played the role of the Mexican singer and composer Álvaro Carrillo in the movie Sabor A Mí, co-starring Angelica Aragón. In 1989, José José released ¿Qué Es El Amor? and included three singles: "Como Tú", "Piel de Azucar" and "Él". "Como Tú" spent ten weeks at number-one on the Hot Latin Songs chart and received a nomination for Pop Song of the Year at the 1990 Lo Nuestro Awards.

=== 1990–1999: "Amnesia", 40 y 20, rehab and decline ===
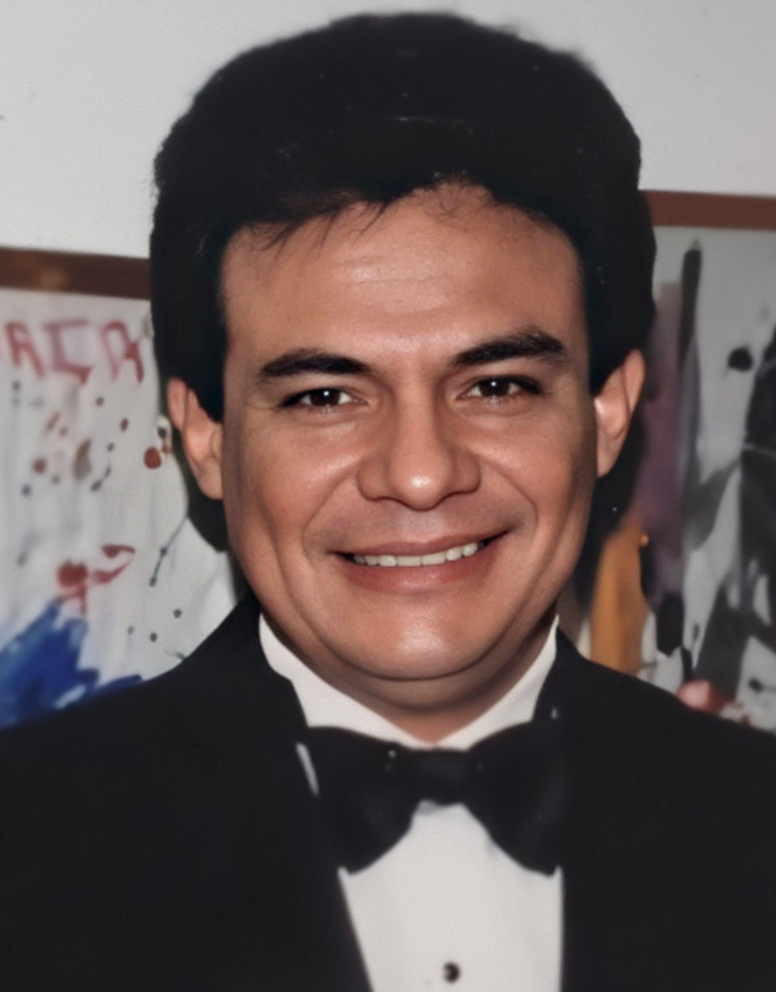
José José in 1990

In 1990, Raúl Velasco made a special TV show to celebrate José's 25th career anniversary. The show, broadcast by Televisa, lasted over five hours and featured special guests such as Armando Manzanero, Libertad Lamarque, Vicente Fernández and Marco Antonio Muñiz. Later that year, he released En las Buenas... y en las Malas with the lead single "Amnesia" reaching number-one on the Hot Latin Songs chart. Two years later, he released 40 y 20 in which the title track speaks about men who fall in love with women that are much younger than them and the reaction of the society to those situations.

By the early 1990s, José's vocals began to deteriorate. It worsened over time and became evident in his live performances. His excessive drinking and unceasing activity of his career caused his voice to falter.

In August 1993, to commemorate the 30th anniversary of José's career, BMG hosted a tribute in the city of Puerto Vallarta. It was called 30 Años de ser el Príncipe (30 years of being the Prince). The tribute included some of the most prestigious artists of Spanish music such as Rocío Dúrcal, Camilo Sesto, Armando Manzanero, Marco Antonio Muñiz and Raúl di Blasio. The tribute coincided with his recent divorce, a serious relapse into alcoholism and a significant loss of vocal abilities. He appeared to be in poor physical shape, too thin and lacking energy. Camilo Sesto even took a break in the middle of the presentation to speak words of encouragement. The album was not released until 1994. At that time, José suffered the worst stage of alcoholism of his life. During 1993, he retired from the stage and went into rehab. Upon completion of his rehabilitation, he started seasons in places like the famous "Teatro Blanquita" of Mexico City, and the Gibson Amphitheatre in Los Angeles, among others.

In 1994, José José reunited with Manuel Alejandro and released the album Grandeza Mexicana. The title track peaked at number 12 on the Hot Latin Tracks. He recorded a duet with his son José Joél in the song "La Fuerza de la Sangre". In 1995, he played the lead role in the movie Perdóname Todo, a drama about an alcoholic has-been and how he tries to survive against himself and the music business. That same year, his album "Mujeriego" was released. It sold more than 180,000 copies in its first two weeks and reached number 12 on the Billboard Latin charts. The song "Llora Corazón" peaked at number 6 on the Hot Latin Songs and was nominated for Pop Song of the Year in the Lo Nuestro Awards.

In 1996, he performed a duet with Paul Anka on "Déjame Conocerte (Let me Get to Know You)" from Anka's Latin album Amigos. In 1997, he performed at the Bally's Atlantic City. In September 1999, he joined fellow Mexican singers Armando Manzanero, Marco Antonio Muñiz and Argentine pianist Raúl di Blasio for a series of concerts dubbed "Noche Bohemia" (Bohemian Night) at the Universal Amphitheatre in Los Angeles.

=== 2000–2012: Vocal problems, TV and Sony BMG concept albums ===
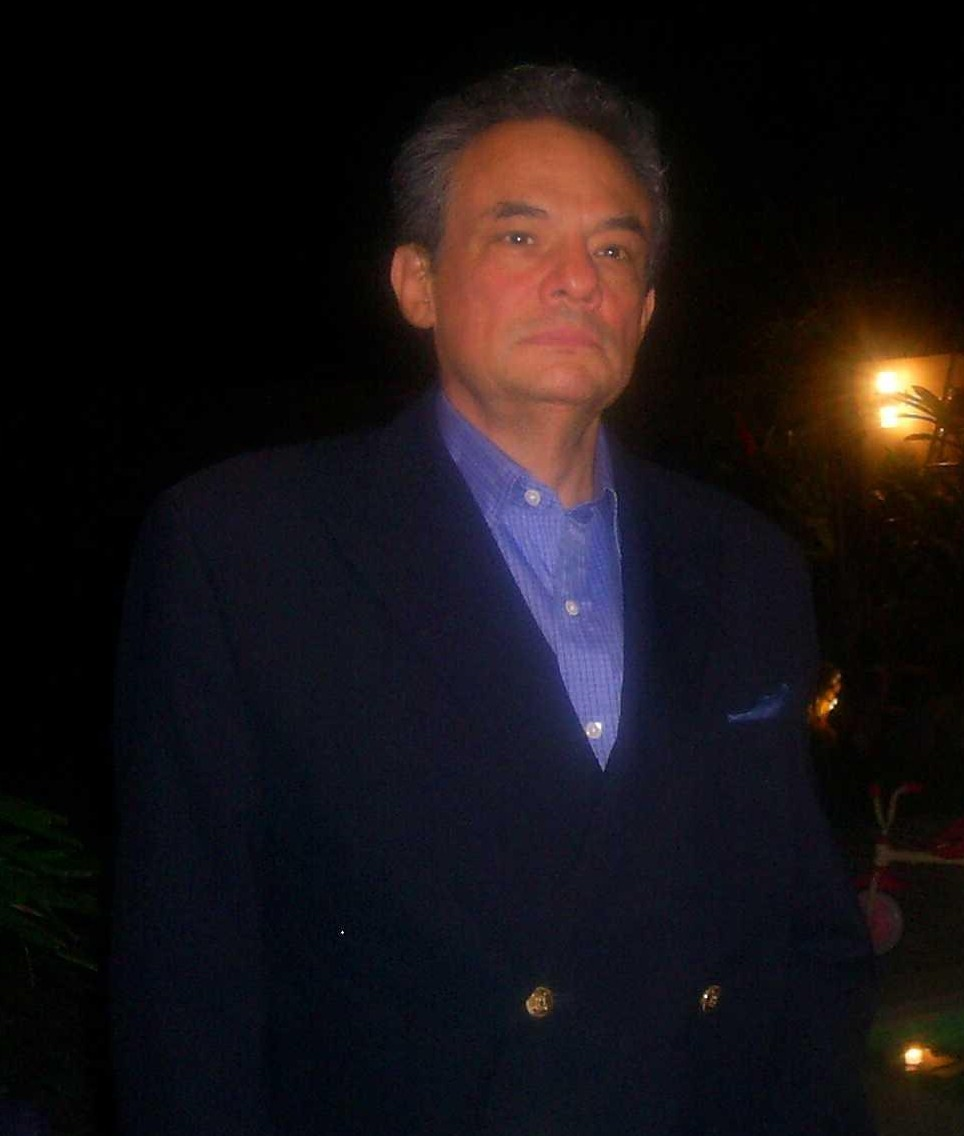
José José in 2007

In 2001, with a deteriorating voice he recorded Tenampa. It was his first studio album with mariachi and the last one of his career. It was written and produced completely by Juan Gabriel. It received poor reviews and sold only about 500,000 units. After that, he retired from recording full-length albums. His vocal problems worsened, affecting not only his ability to sing, but also to speak. In 2003, BMG released a collection of three albums entitled El Principe Con Trio with some of his greatest hits recorded between 1969 and 1983, separated from the original accompaniment, remastered and accompanied by the guitar trio "Los Tres Caballeros", transforming them into boleros.

In the mid-2000s, he played the role of Erasmo Padilla (the father of Leticia "Lety" Padilla) in La Fea Más Bella, a successful Mexican version of the Colombian production Betty la Fea (adapted in the US as Ugly Betty). In 2007, he won a TVyNovelas Award for best supporting actor for his work in La Fea Más Bella.

In 2008, José recorded an emotive song called "Volver a creer" ("Believe Again") with Greek composer Yanni. The song is included on the album Yanni Voices. Yanni stated that he wanted to "help a true legend to fulfill his dream, to sing again". José José was invited by Yanni to sing their song live on Yanni's tour in Mexico. He published his autobiography Esta es mi vida (This is My Life).

In 2010, he released José José Ranchero, another concept album with some of his greatest hits, separated from the original accompaniment, remastered and accompanied with mariachi, giving his classics a traditional Mexican sound. The same year, José launched his own perfume, called simply "José José", the profits from sales help women and children sick with HIV/AIDS.

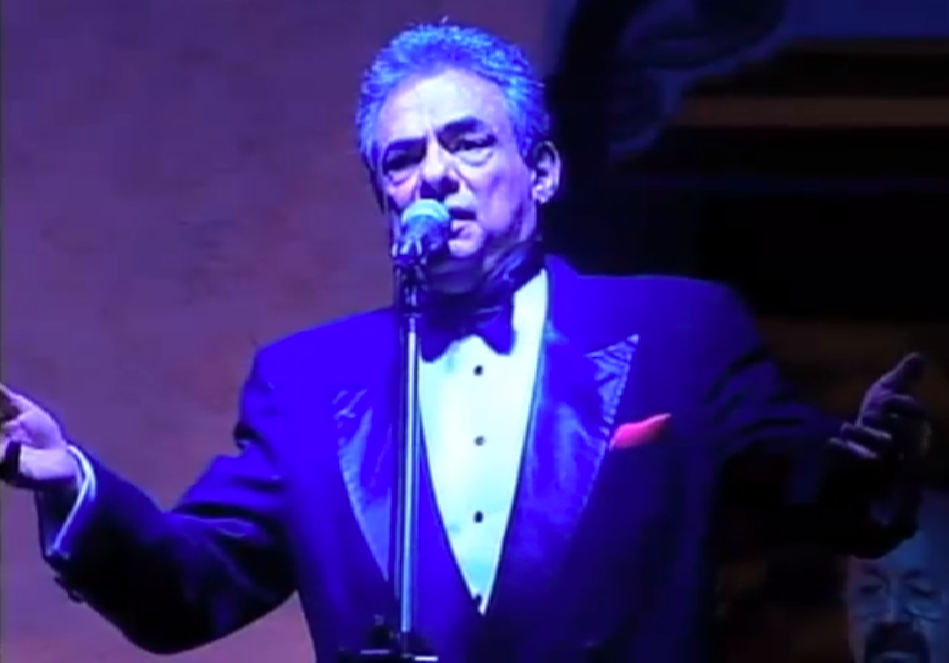
José José in a concert at Guatemala in 2011.

José was planning a new, untitled album, adding that it would consist of nine unreleased tracks and a melody he used to sing in serenades "Que viva mi tristeza", from songwriter Armando Manzanero. It was never completed due to his vocal problems. In 2011, he went on the short Mexican tour "José José y sus amigos" (José José and friends), with singers Dulce, Carlos Cuevas, Celso Piña, and Chamin Correa.

In 2012, as a celebration for his 50-year career, José gave a concert at the Hard Rock Hotel & Casino in Miami, his final live performance.

=== 2024: "Ya no pienso en ti" ===
On 25 September 2024, Sony Music Mexico released through Spotify the inedit single "Ya no pienso en ti", song recorded by José José in London in 1978 for the album Lo Pasado, Pasado.

== Personal life ==
=== Relationships, marriages and family ===
In 1970 he started a relationship with TV hostess, actress, and model Ana Elena Noreña, known in show business as Anel. That year they split and he married Natalia "Kiki" Herrera Calles, a socialite 20 years older. He separated from Herrera and returned to Anel shortly after. He divorced Herrera in 1975 and married Anel in 1976. They had two children: their first-born José Francisco (known as José Joel) who was born in 1975, and their daughter Marysol Estrella, born in 1982. In 1991 he divorced Anel. Four years later, he married Sara "Sarita" Salazar, his third wife. The same year during a Latin American tour, his third child Sara was born. He lived in Miami, Florida, with his wife.

=== Financial problems ===
In later years, José made his financial problems public. Despite being one of the most recognized Latin artists for decades, his alcoholism caused him serious monetary loss. His career declined when he lost his vocal ability, stopping income from live performances. He claimed that during his career he was constantly defrauded by people close to him, including his former wife Anel and her brother. In November 2008, his wife suffered a cerebral haemorrhage, José stated that the medical bills nearly caused him to go bankrupt. He told TV Notas magazine that he and his family lived "day to day" and in 2014, he sold his five-million-dollar house in Coral Gables, Florida, and moved to an apartment in Miami.

=== Health issues and loss of voice ===
José José suffered from a severe case of pneumonia in 1972 and his thoracic diaphragm was paralyzed. The disease almost ended his career. He recovered after months of therapy involving breathing exercises. One of his lungs was permanently damaged. José would suffer dire consequences from his problem with alcoholism, as his health faltered dearly during the 1990s. He developed diabetes.

The effects of alcoholism, the abuse of cortisone, and a hiatal hernia not only affected his ability to sing but to talk, as well. In 2007, he suffered from Bell's palsy. That same year, he lost his voice almost completely as a result of severe chronic gastroesophageal reflux caused by his hiatal hernia, which burned his vocal cords, in addition to neurological damage, the aftereffects of pneumonia, and the impact of alcoholism and smoking, outcoming in irreversible damage to his vocal apparatus. In consequence of these problems, he fought a serious depression. He acknowledged this during an interview on the Univisión program Don Francisco Presenta..., hosted by Don Francisco.

He struggled with diabetic retinopathy in one of his eyes undergoing a successful operation. In 2012, he underwent surgery due to gastritis. In November 2013, he underwent an operation to remove cataracts from one of his eyes.

=== Alcoholism ===
José said that he started drinking at the age of fifteen, when his father (an alcoholic) left home. As a result of his alcoholism, he developed a cocaine habit.

He stated that his addiction was because he "was frail, weak, innocent, ignorant, weak-willed and did not know how to say no". In the early 1970s, after the success of "El Triste" and missing a collaboration with Frank Sinatra, he fell into depression and alcoholism, but with help of his friends and family he managed to stop drinking for a while. His ongoing battle against alcoholism continued during the 1970s and 1980s. He attended AA meetings and stopped drinking for periods of time, but fell steadily back into the addiction. After his divorce from Anel in 1991 he reached his lowest point, reportedly declaring that he wanted to die drinking. With the help of his friends, family and fellow artists, he decided to go to rehab. He went to the Hazelden clinic in Minnesota for rehab and remained a sober recovering alcoholic.

== Illness and death ==
In March 2017, José José announced he had been diagnosed with pancreatic cancer. On 28 September 2019 at 12:17 p.m., José died in a hospital in Homestead, Florida at the age of 71. Although an autopsy was not performed, news outlets reported that he died of pancreatic cancer.

His death shocked Mexico and within several hours became a national trending topic. A large number of personalities, artists, athletes and politicians mourned his death in social media. President of Mexico Andrés Manuel López Obrador stated that "his voice moved a lot of people", highlighting his collaborations with composer Manuel Alejandro, also added that "the best homage is to keep remembering him and listening to his songs".

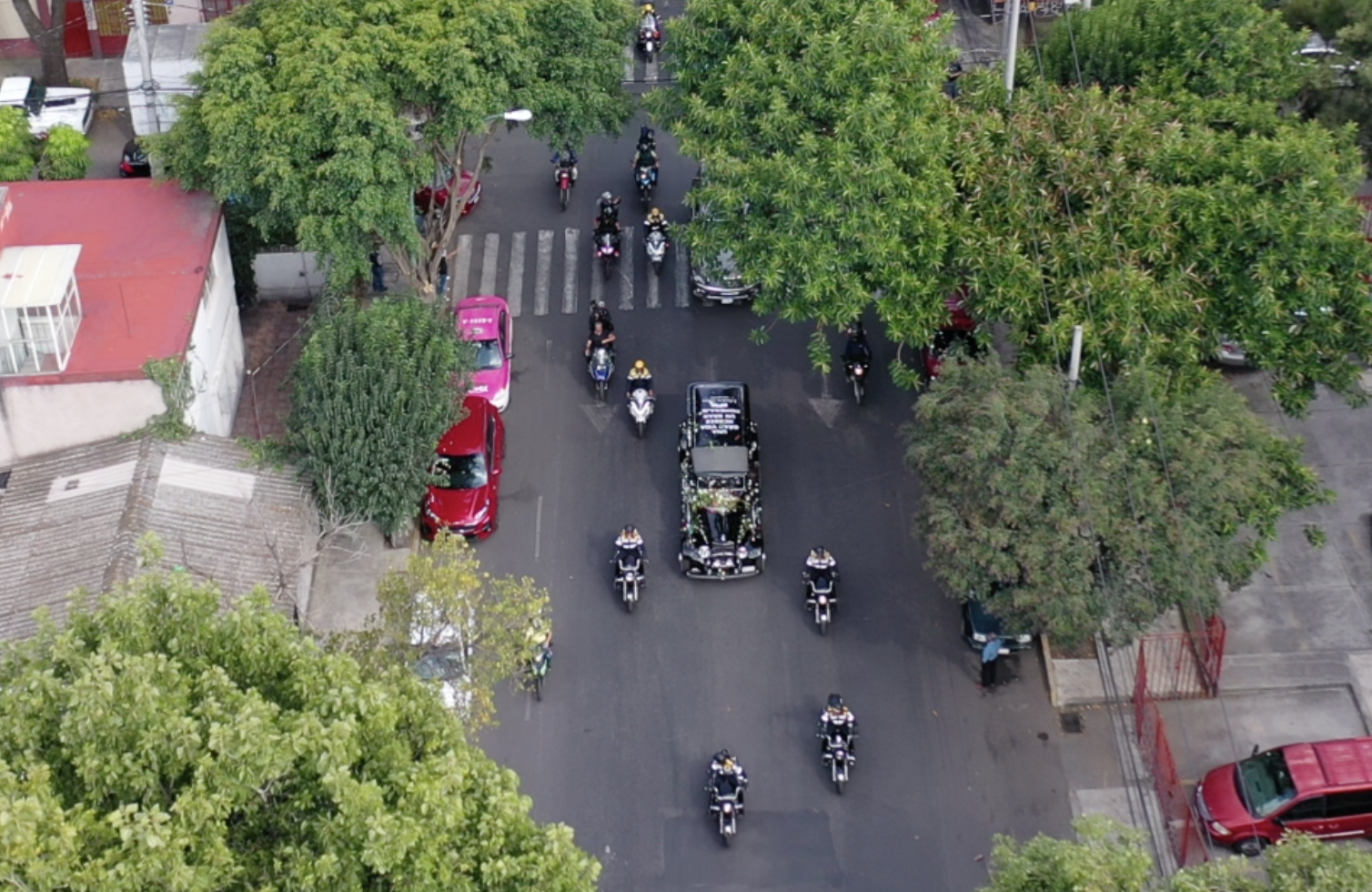
Caravan and float that transported the repatriated remains of the singer in October 2019

On 4 October, a funeral for José was held in Miami which was exclusively for family and friends and José was finally cremated on 8 October. Also on 8 October, his death certificate was revealed and his ashes were divided; with a portion of his ashes staying in Miami, while the remainder of his ashes were flown back to Mexico.

On 9 October, half of his ashes were flown back to Mexico City aboard a Mexican Air Force military plane early in the day. A black hearse picked up the gold plated casket bearing his ashes at the airport and drove to the city's downtown where admirers tossed flowers and waved to the passing vehicle as it made its way to the Palace of Fine Arts. A three-hour long tribute was held at the Fine Arts Palace planned by the Mexican Culture Ministry with members of the National Symphony Orchestra played renditions of some of the icon's ballad songs including "El Triste". Artists from Mexico's the Opera Studio of Fine Arts and the Saloma Quartet also honored the singer's musical legacy during the ceremony. Artists like Emmanuel, Dulce, Lucia Mendez and Jorge Ortiz de Pinedo arrived at the tribute to stood guard for his coffin. His ashes were then taken to the Basilica of Our Lady of Guadalupe for a mass, after the family led a funeral procession through the singer's former neighborhood. The ashes were interred at the Panteón Francés de San Joaquín located in Mexico City.

== Artistry and image ==
José grew up listening to traditional pop, rock and roll, jazz, swing, and big band. He listened to performers such as Elvis Presley, Frank Sinatra, Johnny Mathis and such popular Mexican composers as Consuelo Velázquez and María Grever. He was later inspired by vocalist Barbra Streisand, whom he considered an influence. The son of an operatic tenor and a pianist, he grew up listening to composers such as Chopin and Mozart, but never got the chance to play classical music. In his teens, José learned to play music from top Mexican jazz players and is recognized for playing several instruments, such as the piano, bass, guitar and double bass. Because of his phrasing ability, he was once described as "a singer who sings as a musician". His musical preferences were classical musicians such as Ravel, Debussy and Musorgsky, jazz, and bossa nova.

=== Vocals ===
According to his autobiography, Ésta es mi vida, vocal coach Guido Picco described José José in his early years as a light lyric tenor. The vocals showed through all of his career place him in a light baritone range. José worked for periods with coach Seth Riggs, who later highlighted his vocal abilities. Over time, his voice and vocal style changed noticeably, being his prime the early 1970s. Inheriting the singing qualities of his father, he was able to reach high and low notes easily with a practically flawless intonation. His live performance of "El Triste" in 1970 has been widely praised by many critics for its technique and intensity. His breathing technique allowed him to sustain long and clear notes.

After recording the song "El Triste" for the 2010 album Iconos, singer Marc Anthony said, "once you start to sing it you realize the magnitude, of that spectacular voice and special phrasing of José José and his incredible way to perform". On the Latin VH1 show Las 100 grandiosas canciones de los 1980s en español (The 100 Greatest Spanish Songs of the 1980s), singer Diego Verdaguer said: "If today he could sing, he would be the greatest of Latin America." In a 2018 interview, singer Lupita D'Alessio stated "[José] is an icon, the master, the creator of phrasing, he's got a way of phrasing that there will not be another, for me, he is the greatest singer ever, with the pardon of Luis Miguel". D'Alessio also highlighted his technique to breathe and sustain long notes.

== Legacy ==
=== Representation in Mexico ===
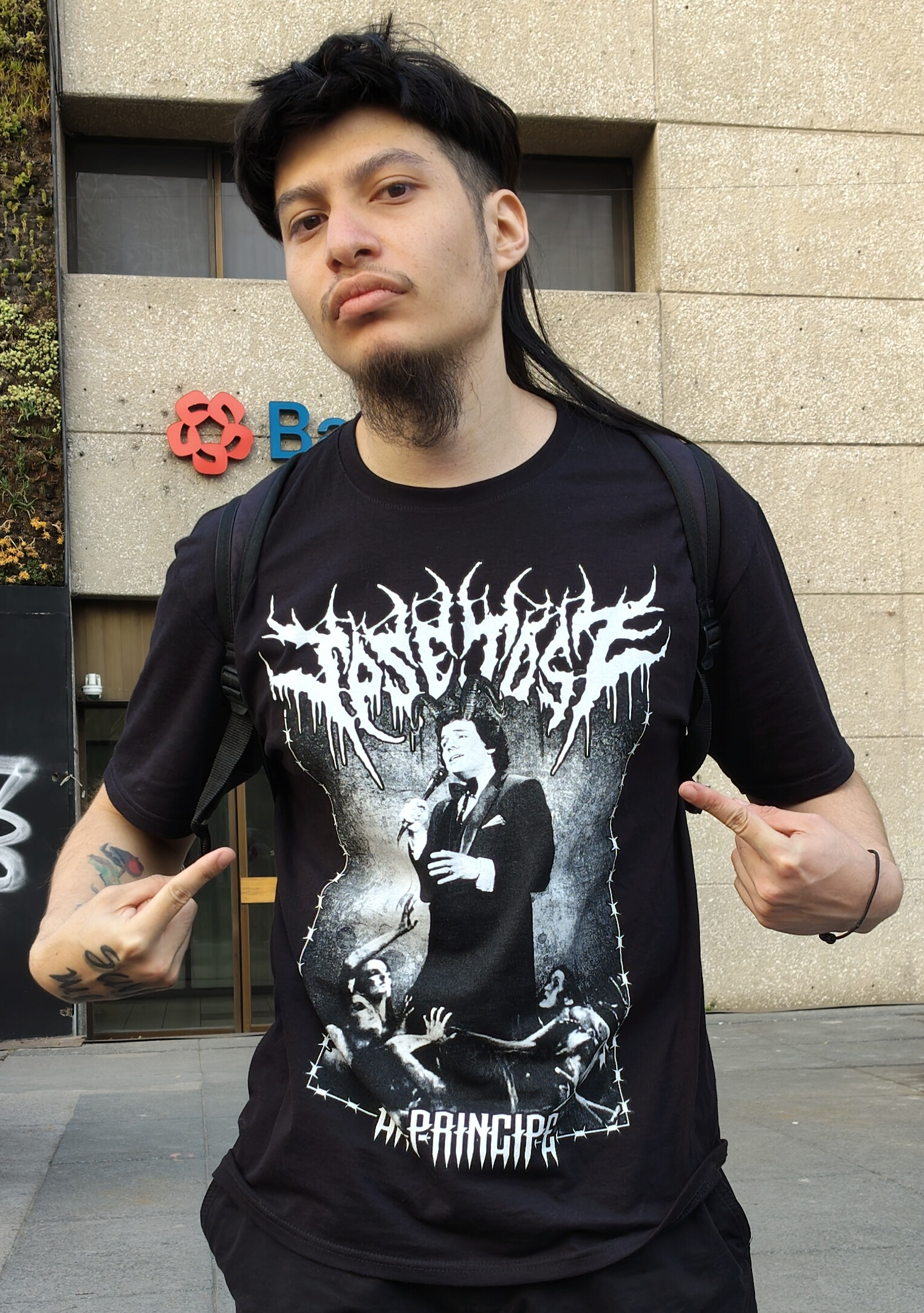
After his death, José José regained popularity among the generations who grew up with his music, as well as new ones, reaching a sector of the young population. Thus, T-shirts (like the one pictured), albums, and other merchandise were commercialized, and "La Nave del Olvido" (spanish for, "The Ship of Oblivion"), a tourist tram that takes visitors to his most emblematic locations in his hometown of Azcapotzalco, was launched.

José José positioned himself as a key figure in Mexican pop culture, being recognized by Mexican media as "the best voice of the second half of the 20th century." Thanks to his musical catalog related to themes of personal suffering, he has been described as a fundamental part of the contemporary history of Mexico and its collective sonic "unconscious". Based on the above, Mexican humor incorporated it into its striking memes, calling several of his songs "migajeras" (spanish for "crumbs") a term used to refer to a person who is content with receiving minimal attention, affection, or time, an expression that was even coined by José's website.

Both before and after his death, José remained popular among younger generations of Mexican listeners, who helped establish him as a widely remembered cultural figure.

=== Musical influence ===
The music of José José is widely known in the Hispanic community. Many artists have acknowledged José as an influence, including Cristian Castro, Vicente Fernández, Alejandro Fernández, Nelson Ned, Pepe Aguilar, Kalimba, Erik Rubin, Manuel Mijares, Lupita D'Alessio, Diego Verdaguer, Reyli, Chayanne, Luis Fonsi and Marc Anthony.

In 1997, José was inducted into Billboard Latin Music Hall of Fame. He received the Billboard Latin Music Lifetime Achievement Award in 2013.

People went mute when he walked onstage ... We were just amazed when he came out, stood there and sang a song with such mastery. He was like an angel. It revolutionized my mind, and little by little I understood that that's what I wanted to do.

— Cristian Castro
Billboard, 2003

In 2002, José José was awarded the Excellence Award at the 14th Annual Lo Nuestro Awards and was inducted into the International Latin Music Hall of Fame. In 2004, he received the Latin Grammy Lifetime Achievement Award. A year later he received the Personalidad del Año (Person of the Year) by the Latin Recording Academy.

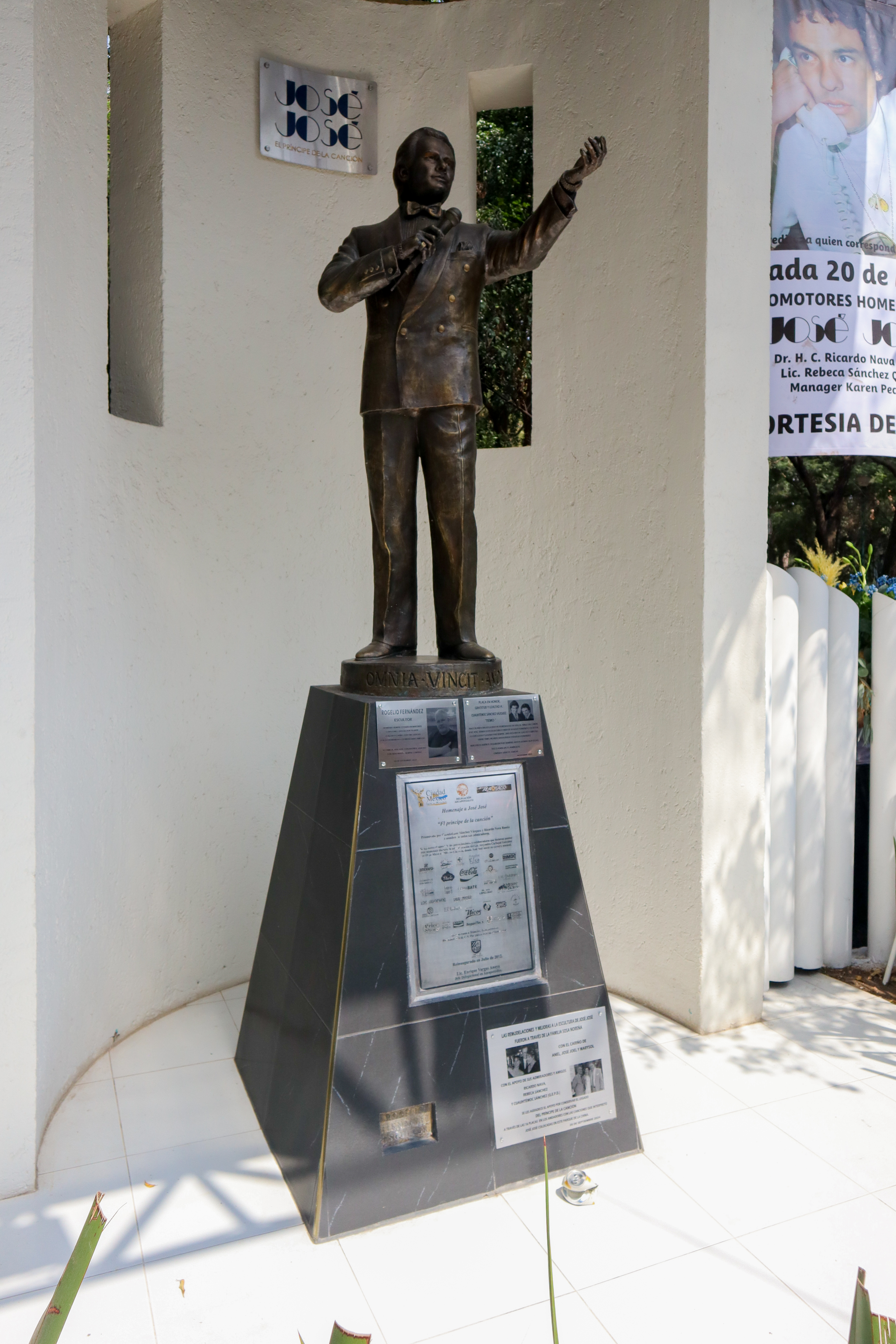
Statue of José José at Parque de la China, photographed in April 2025

In 2006, Televisa produced a TV homage to José José in Acapulco, where singers such as José María Napoleón, Denisse de Kalafe, Francisco Céspedes, among others, performed several of his greatest hits live. A year later, in 2007, a bronze statue was unveiled in his honor in the Azcapotzalco area in Mexico City, where he grew up.

In July 2008, Univision and the Latin Grammy recorded a special TV tribute in Miami to José José, called Latin Grammy Celebra: José José (Latin Grammy Celebrates: José José) at the BankUnited Center. Stars such as Marco Antonio Solís, Ana Bárbara, Alicia Villarreal, Olga Tañon, Luis Fonsi, David Bisbal, and Aventura performed some of his greatest hits live. Stars such as Plácido Domingo, Ricky Martin, Enrique Iglesias, Pepe Aguilar, Pedro Fernández, and RBD, showed their admiration with messages and greetings. Univision described José José as "One of the most beloved singers in Latin music."

=== Tributes ===
Latin rock and hip hop artists such as Molotov, Jumbo, Julieta Venegas, Beto Cuevas, and Aleks Syntek recorded a tribute album in 1998 called Volcán: Tributo a José José (Volcán: Tribute to José José). Each artist recorded one of José's classics such as "Lo Dudo", "El Triste", or "Volcán" in a distinctive fashion. It sold over 500,000 units. Fifteen years after its release, in November 2013, a follow-up to Volcán: Tributo a José José was released under the title Un Tributo 2, featuring performers such as Natalia Lafourcade, Moderatto, Los Claxons, Carla Morrison, and Panteón Rococó.

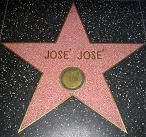
José Jose's star in the Hollywood Walk of Fame

In February 2004, for his contribution to the recording industry, José José received a star on the Hollywood Walk of Fame at 7036 Hollywood Blvd. He was honored by the Las Vegas Walk of Stars with a celebrity star and a book signing at the Rio in Las Vegas on 20 November 2008.

In 2009, Kalimba recorded an album, Amar y Querer: Homenaje A Las Grandes Canciones (Love and Desire: A Tribute to the Great Songs), which featured some of the most iconic Latin ballads, among them: "Amar y querer", "Desesperado", "Volcán", and "El Triste".

On 30 November 2010, Mexican singer Cristian Castro released Viva el Principe (Long Live the Prince) which includes a virtual duet with José José on "Lo Pasado, Pasado" and a poem recited by him. In the poem, José conveys that the singer cannot live if he cannot sing ("Ya no podrá vivir, si ya no canta"); an allusion to losing his singing voice. Rafael Pérez-Botija was involved in the production of the album. The success of Viva el Principe helped revive Castro's career. Castro released another tribute album to José José titled Mi Amigo El Príncipe (My friend the Prince).

On 25 October 2019, 100,000 people paid homage to José during a rainstorm in the Zócalo of Mexico City. Posthumously, he was given the Living Legend Award by the Latin Songwriters Hall of Fame in 2019.

== Filmography ==
Films and television
Year	Title	Role	Notes
1972	Buscando Una Sonrisa		Film
1972	Un sueño de amor	David Granados	Film
1974	La carrera del millón		Film
1977	Variedades de media noche	Singer	Episode: "El príncipe de la canción"
1983	Los secretos de José José	Himself	Film
1984	Siempre en domingo	Himself	Film
1985	Gavilán o Paloma	José Sosa "José José"	Film
1988	Sabor a mí	Alvaro Carrillo	Film
1995	Perdóname Todo		Film
2005	Sueño	Mystery Musician	Film
2006	Double Tap	Mob Leader	Film
2006–2007	La fea más bella	Erasmo Padilla	TV series; Co-lead role
2007	Objetos perdidos	Singer	Voice, Episode: "Objeto 1"
2009	Melate el corazón	Himself	Film

== Selected discography ==
Year	Title	Label
1967	Los PEG	RVV EP1 (México)
1967	Anina y Pepe Sosa	Orfeon (México)
1969	Cuidado	RCA (México)/RCA Victor (US)
1970	La Nave del Olvido	RCA (México)/RCA Victor (US)
1970	El triste	RCA (México)/RCA Victor (US)
1971	Buscando una sonrisa	RCA (México)/RCA Victor (US)
1972	De pueblo en pueblo	RCA (México)/RCA Victor (US)
1972	Cuando tú me quieras	RCA (México)/Arcano Records (US)
1973	Hasta que vuelvas	RCA (México)/Arcano Records (US)
1974	Vive	RCA (México)/Arcano Records (US)
1975	Tan cerca... Tan lejos	RCA (México)/Arcano Records (US)
1976	El príncipe	RCA (México)/Arcano Records (US)
1977	Reencuentro	Ariola (México)/Pronto Records (US)
1978	Volcán	Ariola (México)/Pronto Records (US)
1978	Lo pasado, pasado	Ariola (México)/Pronto Records (US)
1979	Si me dejas ahora	Ariola (México)/Pronto Records (US)
1980	Amor, amor	Ariola (México)/Pronto Records (US)
1981	Romántico	Ariola (México)/Pronto Records (US)
1981	Gracias	Ariola (México)/Pronto Records (US)
1982	Mi vida	Ariola (México)/Pronto Records (US)
1983	Secretos	Ariola (México/US)
1984	Reflexiones	Ariola (México/US)
1985	Gavilán o paloma	Ariola (México/US)
1985	Promesas	Ariola (México/US)
1986	Siempre contigo	Ariola (México/US)
1987	Soy así	Ariola (México/US)
1988	Sabor a mí	Ariola (México/US)
1989	¿Qué es el amor?	BMG Ariola (México/US)
1990	En las Buenas... y en las Malas	BMG Ariola (México/US)
1992	40 y 20	BMG Ariola (México/US)
1994	Grandeza mexicana	BMG (México/US)
1995	Mujeriego	BMG (México/US)
1997	Tesoros	BMG (México/US)
1998	Y algo más	BMG (México/US)
1998	Distancia	BMG (México/US)
2001	Tenampa	BMG (México/US)

== Billboard charts ==
https://www.billboard.com/artist/jose-jose/chart-history/htl/

- ¿Y Quién Puede Ser? (#1)
- Soy Así (#1)
- Como Tú (#1)
- Amnesia (#1)
- Corre y Ve con El (#4)
- 40 y 20 (#4)
- Mi Hembra (#5)
- Esa Mujer (#5)
- Eso Nomás (#5)
- Atrapado (#7)
- Llora Corazón (#7)
- Vergüenza Me Da Quererte (#8)
- Pruébame (#10)
- Él (#12)
- Grandeza Mexicana (#12)
- Un Hotel en Vez de Corazón (#15)
- Piel de Azúcar (#16)
- Sin Saber (#18)
- El Más Feliz del Mundo (#19)
- Salúdamela Mucho (#22)

== See also ==
- List of best-selling Latin music artists
