= Mi Vida (José José album) =

Studio album by José José
- Released: November 30, 1982 (México)
- Recorded: 1982
- Genre: Pop
- Label: Ariola
- Producer: Rafael Pérez Botija, José José

José José chronology
Gracias (1981)	Mi Vida (1982)	Secretos (1983)

Mi Vida (My life) is the title of the studio album released by Mexican pop singer José José in 1982. The main hits of the album were: "Mi vida", "Contigo no", "Siempre te vas", "Nunca sabrán" and "Desesperado". José José continued positioned as one of the top sellers of records in Latin America. The album earned six Gold and one Platinum albums.

== Track listing ==
No.	Title	Writer(s)	Length
1.	"Mi Vida"	Rafael Pérez Botija	4:02
2.	"Aqui Estoy Yo"	Guillermo Ruiz	3:47
3.	"Contigo No"	Alejandro Jaén	3:44
4.	"Soy Tan Infiel"	Gil Rivera/Jesús Lopez	3:18
5.	"Y Para Qué"	José María Napoleón	3:05
6.	"Nunca Sabrán"	José Antonio Farías "Potro"	3:55
7.	"Desesperado"	Rafael Pérez Botija	3:34
8.	"Vale La Pena Intentarlo"	Ma. Esther de Rodríguez	3:52
9.	"Yo No Soy Digno de Ti"	Rafael Pérez Botija	3:38
10.	"Siempre Te Vas"	Juan Carlos Calderón	4:32
11.	"Regresar Al Ayer"	José Antonio Farías "Potro"	3:15
12.	"No Es a Mí"	Gil Rivera	3:50

== Musical arrangement and direction ==
- 1,7,9: Rafael Pérez Botija
- 3,6,10: Michel Colombier
- 2,11: Clare Fischer
- 4,5,8: Armando Noriega
- 12: Oscar Castro Neves
