= Cuando tú me quieras =

Studio album by José José
- Released: 1972
- Genre: Latin pop, Latin ballad
- Length: 31 Minutes
- Label: RCA Víctor
- Producer: Eduardo Magallanes

Cuando tú me quieras (When you want me) Is the sixth studio album by Mexican singer José José. It was released under the RCA Víctor record label in 1972. For this album, he works for the first time with the Mexican composer and music producer Eduardo Magallanes. They highlight songs like "Cuando tú me quieres, Todo es amor, Pobre de mi... Si tú te vas y Sabrás que te quiero." The song "Todo es amor" was included in an album at the end of that same year. The latter was the main theme of the Mexican soap opera of the Telenovela network Mi primer amor (1973). under the production of Antulio Jiménez Pons. He was the protagonist of Raúl Ramírez and Sonia Furió.

== Track listing ==
Cuando tú me quieras track listing
No.	Title	Writer(s)	Length
1.	"Cuando tú me quieras"	Raúl Shaw Moreno · Mario Barrios	2:59
2.	"Tonto"	Armando Manzanero	3:20
3.	"Por este amor que siento en mí"	Juan Marcelo	2:56
4.	"Volverás, volverás"	Guillermo Thorndike · Luis González	2:53
5.	"Que tengas suerte"	Arturo Castro	3:43
6.	"Si estás enamorada... Aleluya!"	Alberto Cortez	3:11
7.	"Sabrás que te quiero"	Teddy Fregoso	3:25
8.	"Pobre de mí... Si tú te vas"	Gabino Correa · Armando Patrono	2:50
9.	"Todo es amor"	M. Salamanca · Sergio Esquivel	2:30
10.	"Es mejor soñar"	Tessandori · Cassia · Aloiso; Adapt: al español: C. García Lecha	3:35

== Credits and position ==
- José José – Voice
- Mario Patrón – Arrangements and direction on tracks 2, 4 and 6.
- Ángel "Pocho" Gatti – Arrangements and direction on tracks 3 and 8.
- Arturo Castro – Arrangements and direction on track 5.
- Enrique Neri – Arrangements and direction on track 10.
- Eduardo Magallanes – Arrangements and direction on tracks 1, 7, 9 and production.
