= Jumbo (band) =

Mexican rock band

- Origin: Monterrey, Nuevo León, Mexico
- Genres: Rock; Alternative rock
- Years active: 1997–present
- Labels: Indie/Independiente
- Members: Alejandro Clemente Castillo Guerra; Carlos Alfredo Castro Aradillas; Alberto Ramos Estrada; Iñigo (Trinidad Eneko)
- Past members: Jorge Tamez Chapa; Eduardo David González Peláez; Enrique Demián González Peláez
- Website: http://www.jumbo.com.mx

Jumbo is the name of an Avanzada Regia alternative rock band from Monterrey, Mexico.

They were founded in May 1997 with the following lineup:

- Alejandro Clemente Castillo Guerra, known simply as "Castillo"; (vocals and guitar)
- Jorge Tamez Chapa, a.k.a. "Flip Fantastic", "Fruit", or "Flipi"; (guitar)
- Carlos Alfredo Castro Aradillas, a.k.a. "Charly Pornet"; (bass guitar)
- Eduardo David González Peláez., a.k.a. "Edy" or "Eddie"; (keyboard)
- Enrique Demián González Peláez, a.k.a. "Bugs Wako"; (drums)

== History ==
In the early 1990s, before the creation of Jumbo, Castillo, Charly, Eddie, Chuy Guerra, Javier Othón and René Garza formed a band called "Blueswagen" which played mainly covers of bands like The Beatles, The Rolling Stones, The Doors, Pink Floyd, R.E.M., U2, The Police, Lenny Kravitz, Stone Temple Pilots and Red Hot Chili Peppers. They started gaining more fans and an increasing popularity, which led to playing bars and clubs and recording many demos. BMG obtained one of the demos and started looking for them. Later the band signed with them.

In 1996, Flip joined the band and in 1997 Bugs, Eddie's brother, returned from Quintana Roo, Mexico and also joined the band. They changed the band's name to "Jumbo", after an Asian baby boy named Jumbo Jin Li who weighed at the time approximately 50 kg.

In 1997 and 1998, they recorded their first album, "Restaurant", which included the singles "Monotransistor", "Siento que...", "Aquí" and "Fotografía", songs which were well received by the public. At that time they were greatly inspired by Gustavo Cerati's Bocanada album performance in the Metropolitan Theater. They recorded the song "Lo dudo" for the album "Volcán: Tributo a José José", a tribute to José José, a legend in Mexico.

In 2000 they were part of the 17-city Revolucion Tour 2000, alongside Jaguares, La Gusana Ciega, Julieta Venegas and other Latin rock artists. Ernesto Lechner wrote in the Los Angeles Times: "Power-pop quintet Jumbo relies on its goofy lyrics and evocative hooks to create an indelible impression of sweet nostalgia".

In May 2005, brothers Eddie and Bugs Wako left the band. Bugs moved with his wife to Los Angeles, while Eduardo left the band so he could pursue different musical projects. However, in September of that same year the remaining members with new drummer Beto Ramos released Gran panorámico, a greatest hits album with two new songs.

== Discography ==
=== Restaurant (1999) ===
1. "Monotransistor"
2. "DulceÁcido"
3. "Aquí"
4. "Fotografía"
5. "Nova"
6. "Superactriz"
7. "Siento Que..."
8. "Dilata"
9. "Desde Que Nací"
10. "Explosión"
11. "Automático"
12. "Alienados Para Siempre"
13. "Tú Me Ves"
14. "Siempre En Domingo"t

=== D.D. y Ponle Play (2001) ===
1. "D.D. Y Ponle Play (Intro)"
2. "Rockstar"
3. "Audiorama"
4. "Cámara Lenta"
5. "Después"
6. "Motocicleta"
7. "Happy High"
8. "Día"
9. "Cada Vez Que Me Voy"
10. "Far Out"
11. "Desaparecer"
12. "Hoy"
13. "D.D. Y Ponle Play (Outro)"

=== Teleparque (2003) ===
1. "Un Poco Más"
2. "Bajo control"
3. "En Repetición"
4. "Yeah"
5. "15 Horas"
6. "Se Derrumba"
7. "Instrumental #2"
8. "No Extraño Nada"
9. "Black Party"
10. "Atrás"
11. "Sintonizando"
12. "Estampida"

=== Gran Panorámico (2005) ===
1. "Caminando Hacia Atrás"
2. "Hasta que el Sol se Apague"
3. "Enseñame a Olvidar (Intocable)"
4. "Rockstar"
5. "Siento Que"
6. "Cámara Lenta"
7. "En Repetición"
8. "Fotografía"
9. "Cada Vez Que Me Voy"
10. "Día"
11. "Motocicleta"
12. "Atrás"
13. "Después"
14. "No Extraño Nada"
15. "DulceAcido"
16. "Monotransistor"
17. "Bajo Control"
18. "Desde Que Nací"
19. "Lo Dudo (En Vivo)"
20. "Super Actriz (en vivo)"
21. "Aquí"

=== Superficie (2007) ===
1. Un Millón De Vueltas
2. Fuerza De La Gravedad
3. Nos Vamos A Encontrar
4. Y Por Ahora
5. Una Parte De Ti
6. No Me Hagas Caso
7. Háblame
8. Cuántas Veces Me Dices Que No
9. Aquí No Pasa Nada
10. Se Hace Tarde
11. Uno de Estos Días
12. Veo
13. Una Isla Y El Mar
14. Escóndeme

=== Alamo. Canciones en Madera. Vol 1 (2009) ===
1. Transformándonos En Sal
2. Invencibles
3. Y Por Ahora
4. Criminal
5. Nos Vamos A Encontrar
6. Vive

=== Alto Al Fuego (2011) ===
1. Alto Al Fuego
2. A Veces
3. Biografía De Una Idea
4. Bla Bla Bla
5. Nada Es Coincidencia
6. Mundo Pequeño
7. Segundo Tiempo
8. Nubes
9. Plática
10. Click

=== Manes (2012) ===
1. Rocket Man (I Think It's Going To Be a Long, Long Time)
2. Soul Man
3. Mr. Tambourine Man
4. Mr. Sandman
5. Rambling Man
6. Here Comes Your Man
7. Iron Man

=== Alfa Beta Grey (2014) ===
1. Bala Perdida
2. Sin Respuesta
3. Cambio y Fuera
4. De Pie
5. Estrellas
6. Invisible
7. El Fin del Mundo (Y Este Absurdo Caos Que Echamos a Andar)
8. Siempre Más
9. Juego de Herir
10. Hologramas
11. Estrellas (Acústica)

=== Manual De Viaje A Un Lugar Lejano (En Directo) (2018) ===
1. En Repetición (En Directo) - Jumbo
2. Caminando Hacia Atrás (En Directo) - Jumbo, Chetes
3. Estrellas (En Directo) - Jumbo
4. Cada Vez Que Me Voy (En Directo) - Jumbo, Alberto Lugo
5. Fotografía (En Directo) - Jumbo, Jay De La Cueva
6. Nos Vamos A Encontrar (En Directo) - Jumbo
7. A Veces (En Directo) - Jumbo, Daniela Spalla
8. Rockstar (En Directo) - Jumbo, Paco Familiar
9. Siento Que… (En Directo) - Jumbo, Daniel Gutiérrez
10. Después (En Directo) - Jumbo
11. Mil Emociones (En Directo) - Jumbo
12. Cuantas Veces Me Dices Que No (En Directo) - Jumbo
13. Yo Sin Tu Amor (En Directo) - Jumbo, Alicia Villareal
14. Aquí (En Directo) - Jumbo, Tony Hernández
