= Anel (actress) =

Mexican model and actress (born 1944)

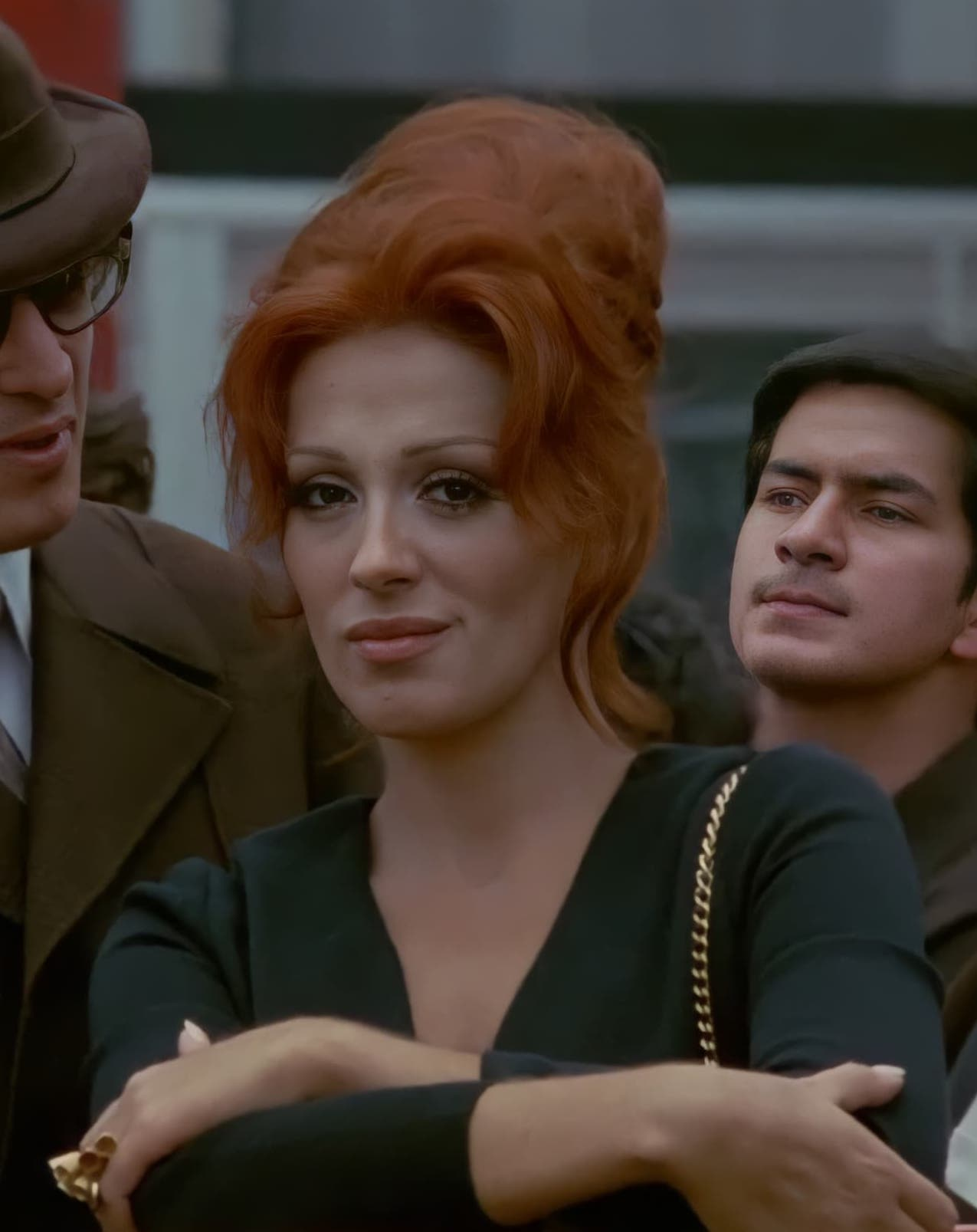
- Anel in El ardiente deseo (1971)
- Born: Ana Elena Noreña Grass; October 10, 1944 (age 81); Mexico City, Mexico
- Occupations: Actress; model
- Years active: 1970–present
- Title: Miss Mexico 1965
- Spouse: José José (m. 1976; div. 1991)
- Children: 2
- Parents: Manuel Noreña (father); Elena Grass (mother)

Ana Elena Noreña Grass (born October 10, 1944), known professionally as Anel, is a Mexican actress and former model. She debuted in 1970 on the film Tápame contigo.

== Early life ==
Anel was born in Mexico City on October 10, 1944. She was the eldest child of Manuel Noreña, a car salesman, and Elena Grass, housewife. When she was little, her father decided to move to Tijuana, Baja California. Soon after, her mom was offered a job as a housekeeper in Los Angeles, California. Anel was only fifteen years old when she found herself working for Edith Head as the lead live in housekeeper in her mansion in Beverly Hills. While working under Edith she met a lot of Hollywood stars and learned how to entertain. Edith helped her enlist to become Miss Mexico, which was a contest in Los Angeles. Anel won first place and went to Mexico to receive the award, while in Mexico she met executives which helped her land her first television appearance and from there she worked on many soap opera and movie projects.

== Personal life ==
In 1975 Anel started a relationship with the Argentine actor Rafael del Río, after that, she married the Mexican singer José José. After 15 years of marriage, the couple divorced in 1990. During her marriage they had two children.

== Filmography ==
Films, Telenovelas, Television
Year	Title	Role	Notes
1970	Tápame contigo		Film
1971	El amor tiene cara de mujer	Claudia	Supporting role
1971	Siempre hay una primera vez		Film
1971	Las reglas del juego		Film
1971	Los novios	Maru	Film
1971	Espérame en Siberia, vida mía		Film
1971	La mula de Cullen Baker		Film
1971	El ardiente deseo		Film
1972	El arte de engañar	Estela	Film
1972	Muñeca reina	Silvia	Film
1972	Tampico		Film
1972	Santo vs. la hija de Frankestein		Film
1972	Tonta, tonta, pero no tanto	Lucy	Film
1972	Padre nuestro que estás en la tierra	Marta	Film
1973	Interval	Jackie	Film
1973	Las tarántulas	Georgette	Film
1973	El amor tiene cara de mujer		Film
1973	El honorable Señor Valdez	Andrea	Supporting role
1975	Paloma	Margo	Supporting role
1991	Alcanzar una estrella II	Verónica Vélez	Supporting role
1992	La sonrisa del Diablo	Perla	Supporting role
1994	Agujetas de color de rosa	Rebeca del Moral	Supporting role
1996	Tú y yo	Laura/Elena Campos	Supporting role
1998	Vivo por Elena	Jenny	Supporting role
2000	Que bonita familia: Papá 2000	Adriana's mother	Film
2006	Mujer, casos de la vida real	Herself	1 Episode: "Reina de belleza"
2007/08	Yo amo a Juan Querendón	Delfina de la Cueva	Supporting role
2008	La rosa de Guadalupe	Capitana	1 Episode: "Ciber-amigo"
2009	Mujeres Asesinas 2	Esperanza	1 Episode: "Rosa, heredera"
2011/12	Una familia con suerte	Fabiana	Special Appearance

Awards and achievements
Preceded by Ana Martín	Miss Mexico; 1965	Succeeded by María Cristina Ortal
