= Parque de la China =

Public park in Mexico City

- Interactive map of Parque de la China
- Location: Clavería, Azcapotzalco, San Miguel Amantla, 02080 Ciudad de México, CDMX, Mexico
- Coordinates: 19.4648°N 99.1787°W

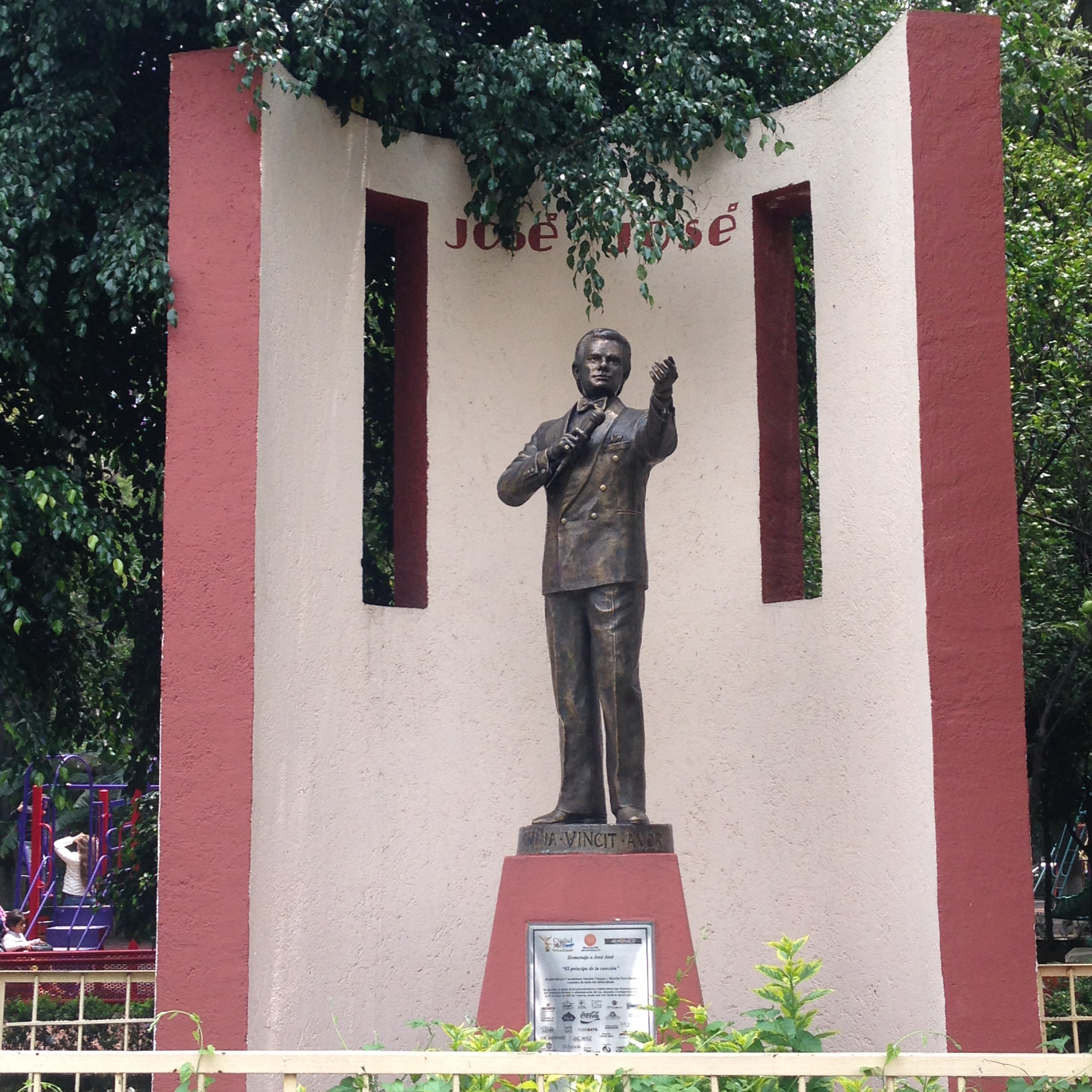
Statue of José José

Parque de la China is a park in Mexico City.

It is located in the Colonia Clavería of the Azcapotzalco delegation of Mexico's Federal District. It is adjacent to the Obrero Popular neighborhood and is close to Cuitláhuac Avenue.

== History ==
The land occupied by the current Clavería colony belonged to the Matsumoto family, well-known florists in Mexico, when it was very wide and had a lot of vegetation and trees (hence the name Forest of China), even years ago, you could see Several squirrels traverse the branches of their leafy trees. The park is currently used as a cultural center and for physical exercise. As well, it has areas for games and recreation, where they usually make food exhibitions in the states of the Mexican Republic.

The park has a kiosk in the middle, built for the visit of President José López Portillo, wide spaces, gravel roads and land for running or hiking. It has a playground for children, an area with exercise equipment. In the park there is a statue of José José, because he was born and lived his childhood in this colony. It is near the large commercial area of Clavería, Boy Scouts meetings are also usually held, and on Sundays classes and workshops of crafts for children and adults.

== See also ==
- Azcapotzalco
