= Buscando Una Sonrisa =

Studio album by José José
- Released: 1971 (México)
- Recorded: Mexico
- Genre: Latin pop
- Label: RCA

José José chronology
| El Triste (1970) | Buscando Una Sonrisa (1971) | De Pueblo En Pueblo (1971) |

Buscando Una Sonrisa (Looking for a smile) is the title of the studio album released by Mexican singer José José in 1971.

At the same time of its release, José José debuts in cinema as an actor, in a film of the same name, some of the songs of the album were used as the soundtrack: "Buscando una sonrisa", "Hoy cuando tú no estás", "Llegaste a mi" and "Cosas imposibles".

== Track listing ==
1. Buscando una Sonrisa (Jonathan Zarzora)
2. Sólo Amor (Rafael Macias Cruz)
3. Llegaste a Mí (Eduardo Salas; Alfonso Ontiveros)
4. Amor Mío (Álvaro Carrillo)
5. En una tarde de verano (Eduardo Salas; Alfonso Ontiveros)
6. Dos Rosas (Sergio Esquivel; Guillermo "Memo" Salamanca)
7. Hoy Cuando ya no Estás (Eduardo Salas; Alfonso Ontiveros)
8. Cosas Imposibles (Armando Manzanero)
9. La Primera Vez (Enrique Navarro)
10. La Barca (Roberto Cantoral)
