= Gavilán o Paloma =

- Directed by: Alfredo Gurrola
- Written by: Fernando Galiana; José José
- Produced by: Carlos Amador
- Starring: José José; Christian Bach; Jorge Ortiz de Pinedo
- Distributed by: Televisa
- Release date: 1985
- Running time: 106 minutes
- Country: Mexico
- Language: Spanish

Gavilán o Paloma (Hawk or Dove) is a 1985 Mexican drama film. The movie is titled after one of José José's greatest songs, which he recorded in 1977. The story chronicles the rise of this Mexican music icon from humble beginnings in Mexico City to international superstardom. Gavilán o Paloma stars José José playing himself, with co-stars Christian Bach and comedian Jorge Ortiz de Pinedo. Fifteen of José José's songs are on the soundtrack.

== Plot ==
José José was born in a Mexican family of talented musicians. His father was an alcoholic operatic tenor and his mother was a pianist. Growing up in the tough neighborhoods of Mexico City, José began his career as a singer in serenades, and later in a jazz trio. His father died and his career took off due to his enormous talent. José started a relationship with Anel (Bach), a beautiful young actress, but because of his alcoholism and infidelities, she leaves him. José marries Kiki Herrera (Gina Romand), a beautiful socialite twenty years older than he is. After several fights and irreconcilable differences, José leaves her. After suffering a terrible pneumonia that nearly ended his career, Anel returns to be by his side and he recovers. After a couple of years without success, José signed a contract with a major record label and returns to the pinnacle of success to stay there for the rest of his career.

== Production notes and awards ==
- It was shot in Mexico City.
- The movie was not a big commercial success because its release coincided with the 1985 Mexico City earthquake.
- It received two nominations in the Ariel Awards in the category of "Best Supporting Actor" (Rojo Grau) and "Best Supporting Actress" (Gina Romand).
