= Como Tú =

"Cómo Tú"

Single by José José

from the album ¿Qué Es El Amor?
- Released: 1989
- Recorded: 1988–1989
- Studio: Electric Lady Studios; Baked Potato Recording (New York City); Record Plant Studios (Hollywood, California)
- Genre: Latin
- Length: 4:14
- Label: RCA Ariola
- Songwriter: Wildo
- Producer: Daniel Freiberg · Óscar López

José José singles chronology
"Verguenza Me Da Quererte" (1988)	"Cómo Tú" (1989)	"Piel de Azúcar" (1989)

"Cómo Tú" ("Like You") is a pop song written by Chilean singer-songwriter Wildo, produced by Daniel Freiberg and Óscar López, and performed by Mexican singer José José. It was released in 1989 as the first single from the studio album ¿Qué Es El Amor? (1989), and became his third number-one single in the Billboard Hot Latin Tracks chart after "¿Y Quién Puede Ser?" (1986) and "Soy Así" (1988).

The song climbed on the Billboard Hot Latin Tracks chart from number five to the top of the chart on March 18, 1989. where spent 10 consecutive weeks. "Como Tú" replaced "Hombres al Borde de un Ataque de Celos" by Mexican performer Yuri and was succeeded at the top of the chart by fellow Mexican performer Luis Miguel with the second single from his album Busca una Mujer (1988), "La Incondicional". At the end of 1989, "Como Tú" ranked as the fourth best-performing Latin single of the year in the United States.
