= Lo Pasado, Pasado =

Studio album by José José
- Released: November 7, 1978 (México)
- Genre: Latin pop
- Label: Ariola
- Producer: Tom Parker

José José chronology
Volcán (1978)	Lo Pasado, Pasado (1978)	Si Me Dejas Ahora (1979)

Lo Pasado, Pasado (The past, is past) is a studio album by Mexican singer José José, released in 1978. The album has the participation of the popular singers/composers Juan Gabriel and José María Napoleón. The first single of the album was the song "Lo pasado, pasado", that instantly became a hit. After that, the singles "Almohada", "Lo que no fue, no será" and "Te quiero tal como eres" (a Spanish-language cover of Billy Joel's "Just the Way You Are") became hits.

== Track listing ==
No.	Title	Writer(s)	Length
1.	"Lo que No Fue, No Será"	José María Napoleón	3:38
2.	"Amor de Discoteque"	José José / Tom Parker	3:43
3.	"Cómo Deseo Hoy Que Sea Mañana"	Guillermo Ruiz	4:21
4.	"Hoy que Faltas Tú"	Miguel Pous	4:00
5.	"Ahora No"	Juan Gabriel	2:51
6.	"Lo Pasado, Pasado"	Juan Gabriel	4:11
7.	"Ahora o Nunca"	Juan Carlos Calderón	3:23
8.	"El Último Beso"	Rafael Pérez Botija	4:13
9.	"Almohada"	Adan Torres	3:35
10.	"Te Quiero Tal Como Eres (Just the Way You Are)"	Billy Joel / Armando Martínez	4:41
11.	"Amor Para Los Dos"	José José	3:50

=== "Ya no pienso en ti" ===
On September 25, 2024, Sony Music Mexico released through Spotify the inedit single “Ya no pienso en ti”, song recorded by José José for this album, but was not included in the final cut.
