= Lo Nuestro Award for Pop Male Artist of the Year =

Latin music award

Lo Nuestro Awards for Pop Male Artist of the Year
- Country: United States
- Presented by: Univision
- First award: 1989
- Currently held by: Enrique Iglesias (2017)

Highlights
- Most awards: Enrique Iglesias (6)
- Website: univision.com/premiolonuestro

The Lo Nuestro Award for Pop Male Artist of the Year is an award presented annually by American network Univision. It was first awarded in 1989 and has been given annually since. The accolade was established to recognize the most talented performers of Latin music. The nominees and winners were originally selected by a voting poll conducted among program directors of Spanish-language radio stations in the United States and also based on chart performance on Billboard Latin music charts, with the results being tabulated and certified by the accounting firm Deloitte. At the present time, the winners are selected by the audience through an online survey. The trophy awarded is shaped in the form of a treble clef.

The award was first presented to Mexican singer José José. Spanish singer-songwriter Enrique Iglesias holds the record for the most awards, winning on six occasions. Mexican artist Luis Miguel won five times in the 90's. Puerto-Rican American singer-songwriter Luis Fonsi have won in four ceremonies. Puerto-Rican American performer Chayanne have received three awards. American artist Marc Anthony earned the accolade for Pop Male Artist and also Tropical Male Artist, likewise, Mexican singers Alejandro Fernández and Cristian Castro have received both the Pop and Regional Mexican Male Artist. Guatemalan singer-songwriter Ricardo Arjona, with eight nominations, holds the record for most nominations without a win.

== Winners and nominees ==
Listed below are the winners of the award for each year, as well as the other nominees for the majority of the years awarded.

Key	Meaning
‡	Indicates the winner

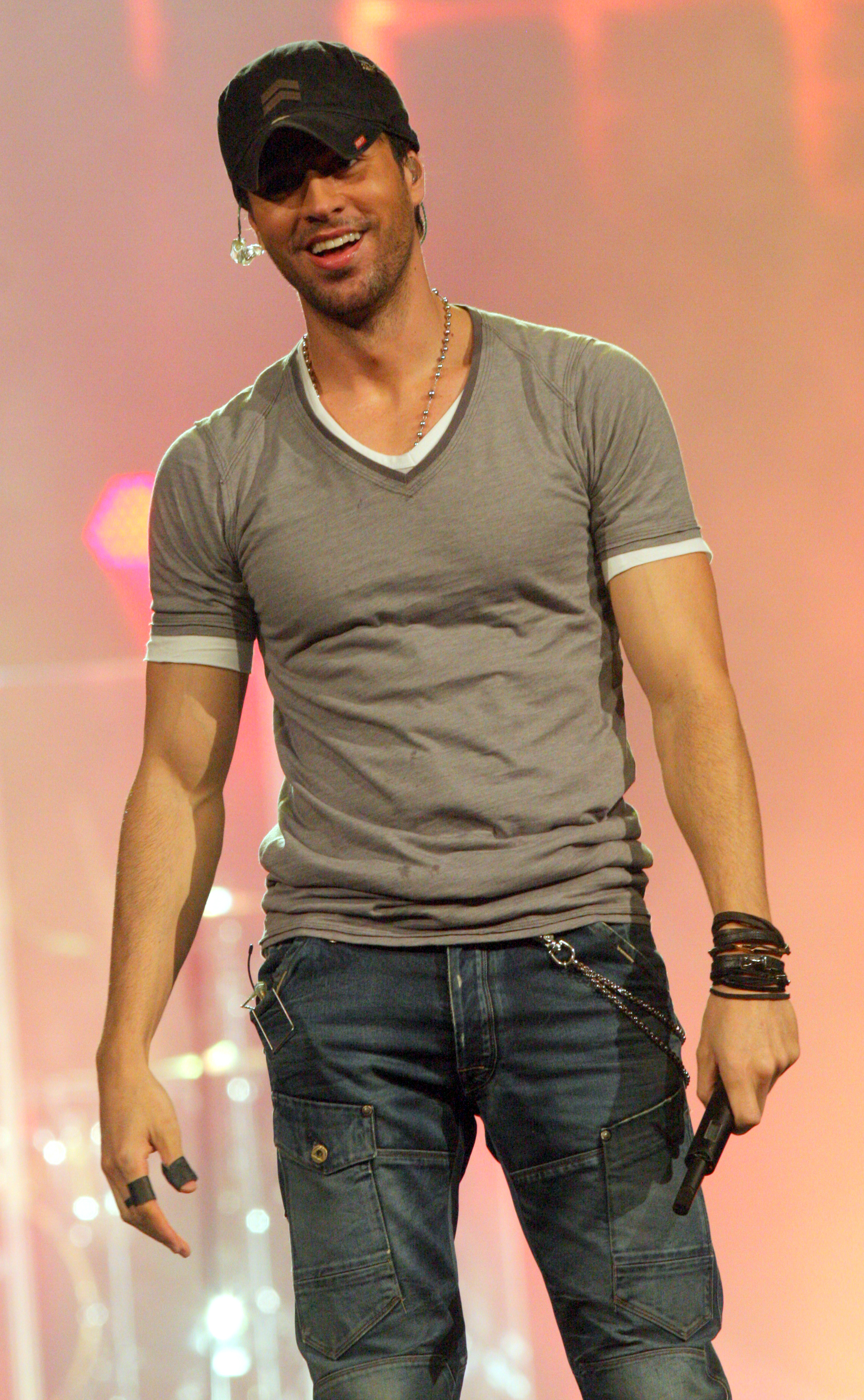
Spanish singer Enrique Iglesias (pictured in 2011), is the most awarded in the category, with six wins

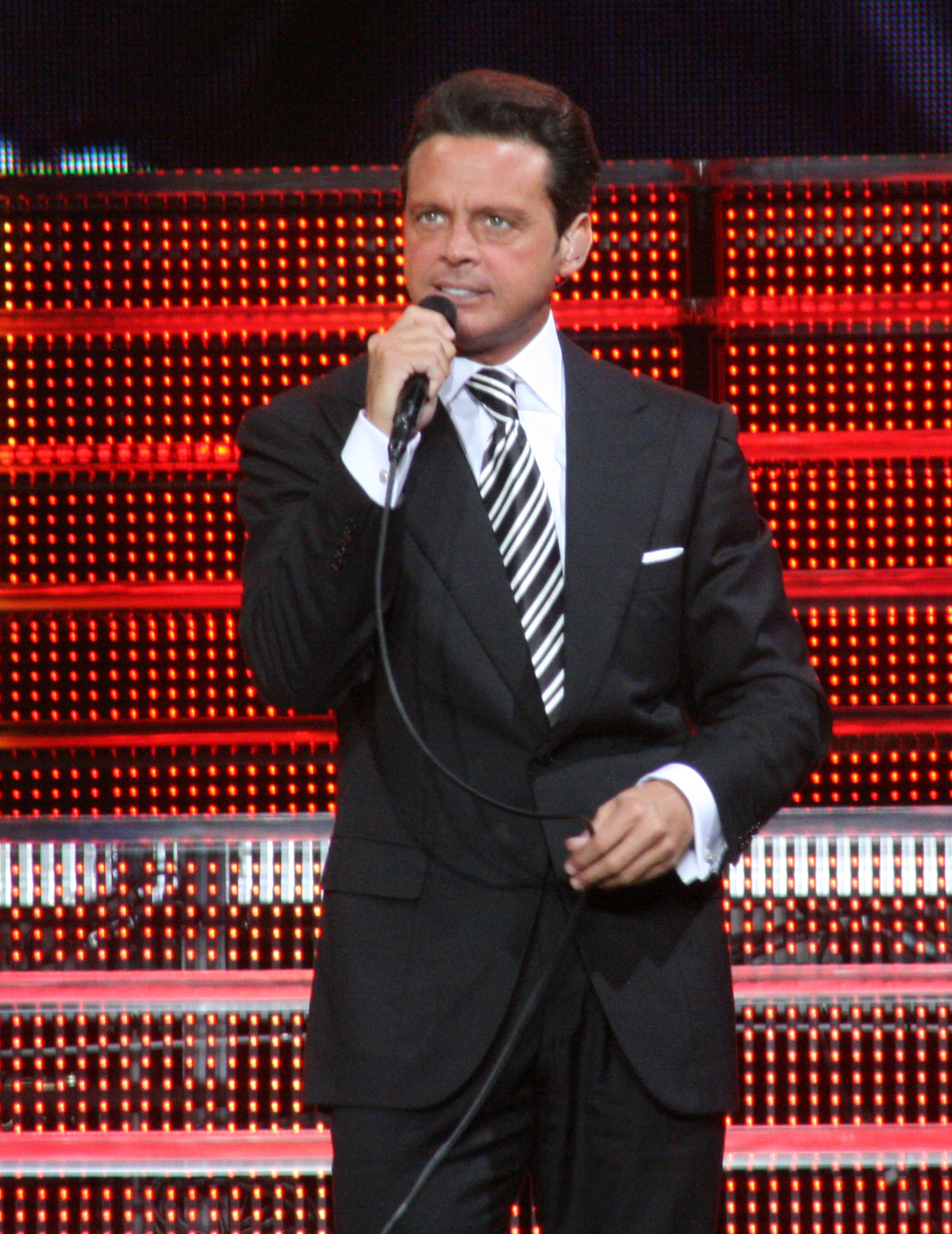
Mexican performer Luis Miguel (pictured in 2009), five-time winner

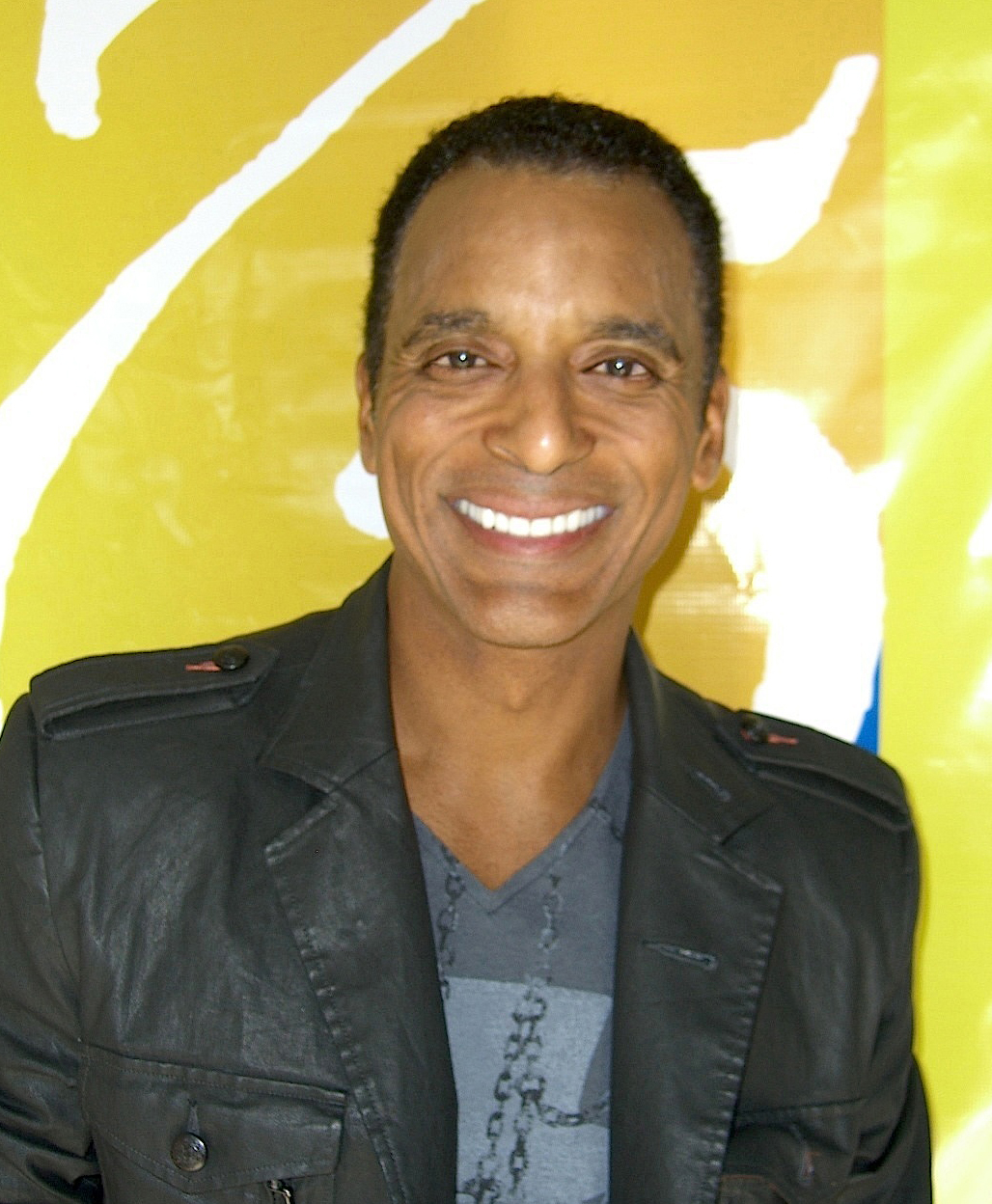
Cuban-American performer Jon Secada (pictured in 2011), winner in 1993

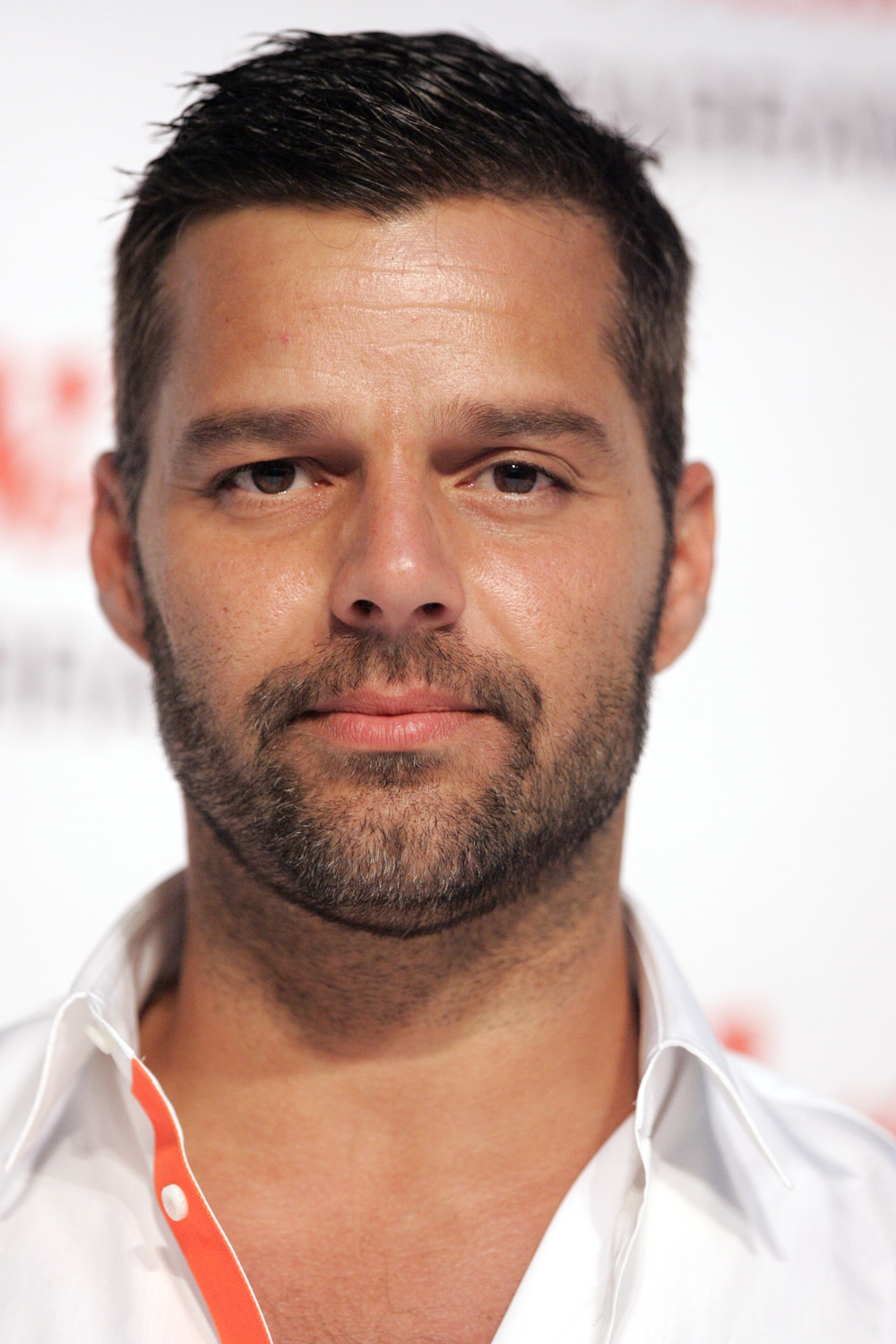
Puerto-Rican American singer Ricky Martin (pictured in 2013), winner in 1999 and 2000

Year	Performer	Ref
1989 (1st)	José José‡	
1989 (1st)	Braulio	
1989 (1st)	Emmanuel	
1989 (1st)	Roberto Carlos	
1990 (2nd)	Chayanne‡	
1990 (2nd)	Luis Miguel	
1990 (2nd)	Ricardo Montaner	
1990 (2nd)	José Luis Rodríguez	
1991 (3rd)	Luis Miguel‡	
1991 (3rd)	Rudy La Scala	
1991 (3rd)	Roberto Carlos	
1991 (3rd)	José Luis Rodríguez	
1992 (4th)	Luis Miguel‡	
1992 (4th)	Raúl di Blasio	
1992 (4th)	Juan Gabriel	
1992 (4th)	Ricardo Montaner	
1993 (5th)	Jon Secada‡	
1993 (5th)	Chayanne	
1993 (5th)	Luis Miguel	
1993 (5th)	Ricardo Montaner	
1994 (6th)	Luis Miguel‡	
1994 (6th)	Cristian Castro	
1994 (6th)	Álvaro Torres	
1994 (6th)	Jon Secada	
1995 (7th)	Luis Miguel‡	
1995 (7th)	Ricardo Arjona	
1995 (7th)	Cristian Castro	
1995 (7th)	Juan Gabriel	
1996 (8th)	Luis Miguel‡	
1996 (8th)	Cristian Castro	
1996 (8th)	Enrique Iglesias	
1996 (8th)	Pedro Fernández	
1997 (9th)	Enrique Iglesias‡	
1997 (9th)	Cristian Castro	
1997 (9th)	Luis Miguel	
1997 (9th)	Marco Antonio Solís	
1998 (10th)	Alejandro Fernández‡	
1998 (10th)	Juan Gabriel	
1998 (10th)	Luis Miguel	
1998 (10th)	Enrique Iglesias	
1999 (11th)	Ricky Martin‡	
1999 (11th)	Alejandro Fernández	
1999 (11th)	Enrique Iglesias	
1999 (11th)	Alejandro Sanz	
2000 (12th)	Ricky Martin‡	
2000 (12th)	Cristian Castro	
2000 (12th)	Chayanne	
2000 (12th)	Marc Anthony	
2001 (13th)	Marc Anthony‡	
2001 (13th)	Cristian Castro	
2001 (13th)	Alejandro Fernández	
2001 (13th)	Luis Miguel	
2002 (14th)	Cristian Castro‡	
2002 (14th)	Alejandro Fernández	
2002 (14th)	Juan Gabriel	
2002 (14th)	Marco Antonio Solís	
2003 (15th)	Juanes‡	
2003 (15th)	Chayanne	
2003 (15th)	Cristian Castro	
2003 (15th)	Enrique Iglesias	
2003 (15th)	Luis Miguel	
2004 (16th)	Juanes‡	
2004 (16th)	Ricardo Arjona	
2004 (16th)	Alexandre Pires	
2004 (16th)	Ricky Martin	
2005 (17th)	Chayanne‡	
2005 (17th)	Obie Bermúdez	
2005 (17th)	Luis Fonsi	
2005 (17th)	Ricky Martin	
2006 (18th)	Luis Fonsi‡	
2006 (18th)	Obie Bermúdez	
2006 (18th)	Alejandro Fernández	
2006 (18th)	Reyli	
2007 (19th)	Luis Fonsi‡	
2007 (19th)	Cristian Castro	
2007 (19th)	Chayanne	
2007 (19th)	Ricardo Arjona	
2008 (20th)	Chayanne‡	
2008 (20th)	David Bisbal	
2008 (20th)	Enrique Iglesias	
2008 (20th)	Ricky Martin	
2009 (21st)	Luis Fonsi‡	
2009 (21st)	Chayanne	
2009 (21st)	Alejandro Fernández	
2009 (21st)	Enrique Iglesias	
2009 (21st)	Tommy Torres	
2010 (22nd)	Luis Fonsi‡	
2010 (22nd)	Ricardo Arjona	
2010 (22nd)	Cristian Castro	
2010 (22nd)	Enrique Iglesias	
2010 (22nd)	Tommy Torres	
2011 (23rd)	Enrique Iglesias‡	
2011 (23rd)	Carlos Baute	
2011 (23rd)	Chayanne	
2011 (23rd)	Alejandro Fernández	
2011 (23rd)	Alejandro Sanz	
2012 (24th)	Enrique Iglesias‡	
2012 (24th)	Carlos Baute	
2012 (24th)	Chayanne	
2012 (24th)	Ricky Martin	
2013 (25th)	Alejandro Sanz‡	
2013 (25th)	Ricardo Arjona	
2013 (25th)	Franco De Vita	
2013 (25th)	Luis Fonsi	
2014 (26th)	Marco Antonio Solís‡	
2014 (26th)	Ricardo Arjona	
2014 (26th)	Frankie J	
2014 (26th)	Alejandro Sanz	
2014 (26th)	Rigú	
2015 (27th)	Enrique Iglesias‡	
2015 (27th)	Ricardo Arjona	
2015 (27th)	Juanes	
2015 (27th)	Ricky Martin	
2015 (27th)	Marco Antonio Solís	
2016 (28th)	Enrique Iglesias‡	
2016 (28th)	Ricardo Arjona	
2016 (28th)	Chayanne	
2016 (28th)	Ricky Martin	
2017 (29th)	Enrique Iglesias‡	
2017 (29th)	Christian Daniel	
2017 (29th)	Marco Antonio Solís	
2017 (29th)	Ricky Martin	

== See also ==
- Grammy Award for Best Latin Pop Album
- Latin Grammy Award for Best Male Pop Vocal Album
