= Romántico (José José album) =

Studio album by José José
- Released: 1981 (México)
- Genre: Bolero
- Label: Ariola
- Producer: José José

José José chronology
Amor Amor (1980)	Romántico (1981)	Gracias (1981)

Professional ratings
Review scores
Source	Rating
AllMusic	3/5 stars

Romántico (Romantic) is a studio album released by Mexican singer José José in 1981. José José performs classic boleros like "La gloria eres tú", "El reloj" and "Regálame esta noche". The album includes one new song: "Polvo enamorado".

== Track listing ==
1. El Reloj (Roberto Cantoral)
2. Como Fue (Ernesto Duarte)
3. Cancionero (Álvaro Carrillo)
4. Reina Mía (Saulo Sedano)
5. Regalame Esta Noche (Roberto Cantoral)
6. Polvo Enamorado (Dr. Mauricio González De La Garza)
7. La Gloria Eres Tú (José Antonio Méndez)
8. Te Me Olvidas (Vicente Garrido)
9. Novia Mía (José Antonio Méndez)
10. Un Poco Más (Álvaro Carrillo)
11. Muchachita (Mario Ruiz Armengol)
12. Tu Ausencia (Alberto Elorza-Martha Rangel)
