= Amor Amor (José José album) =

Amor, Amor

Studio album by José José
- Released: October 16, 1980 (México)
- Genre: Latin pop, bolero
- Label: Ariola
- Producer: José José

José José chronology
Si Me Dejas Ahora (1979)	Amor, Amor (1980)	Romántico (1981)

Amor Amor (Love Love) is the title of the studio album released by Mexican singer José José in 1980. It was recorded at the Salty Dog Studios in Los Angeles, California.

José José opened successfully the decade of the 1980s, as he continued his good run, placing hits such as "Amor Amor", "Insaciable amante" (by Camilo Sesto), "Él" (Rupert Holmes' "Him"), "No me digas que te vas", "Perdido en la oscuridad", and his version of the classic bolero "No me platiques más". The album established him as one of the best-selling Latin singers of that time, setting the tone for future success in the 1980s.

== Track listing ==
1. Insaciable amante (Camilo Blanes)
2. Te amo y no te amo (Lolita De La Colina)
3. No me digas que te vas (Alejandro Jaén)
4. No me platiques más (Vicente Garrido)
5. Aléjate (Sergio Fachelli)
6. Amor, amor (Rafael Pérez Botija)
7. A ratos (Lolita De La Colina)
8. Él (Him) (Rupert Holmes-Oscar Sarquiz Spanish version)
9. Perdido en la oscuridad (Alejandro Jaén)
10. Cosa de dos (José José-Rubén and Alejandro Zepeda-Manolo Noreña)
