= Soy Así =

Studio album by José José
- Released: 24 November 1987
- Recorded: 1987
- Studio: Take One Studios; Mad Hatter Studios; O'Henry and Artison Studios (Los Angeles, California)
- Genre: Latin pop (80's)
- Length: 34:20
- Label: RCA Ariola
- Producer: Rafael Pérez-Botija

José José chronology
Siempre Contigo (1986)	Soy Así (1987)	Sabor a Mí (1988)

Professional ratings
Review scores
Source	Rating
Allmusic	2.5/5 stars

Soy Así (I am like this) is 23rd studio album recorded by Mexican performer José José, It was released by RCA Ariola in 1987. It was written and produced by Spanish producer Rafael Pérez-Botija. This album became the fourth number-one set on the Billboard Latin Pop Albums by the artist and at the Grammy Awards of 1989 was nominated for Best Latin Pop Performance and for Pop Album of the Year at the 1st Lo Nuestro Music Awards.

Soy Así yielded four successful singles: the title track reached the number-one position in the Billboard Hot Latin Tracks chart, while "Mi Hembra" peaked at number 5, "Salúdamela Mucho" at number 22, and "Vergüenza Me Da Quererte" reached number 8.

== Track listing ==
All the songs written, arranged and produced by Rafael Pérez-Botija.

1. "Vergüenza Me Da Quererte"
2. "Ni en un Millón de Años"
3. "Cobarde"
4. "Cinco Minutos"
5. "Salúdamela Mucho"
6. "Soy Así"
7. "Si Te Parece Poco"
8. "Quiero Morir En Tu Piel"
9. "La Estrella"
10. "Mi Hembra"

== Charts ==
Chart (1987)	Peak position
US Billboard Latin Pop Albums	1

== See also ==
- List of Billboard Latin Pop Albums number ones from the 1980s
