= Reencuentro (José José album) =

Studio album by José José
- Released: June 15, 1977 (México)
- Recorded: 1977 in London
- Genre: Latin pop
- Label: Ariola
- Producer: Ramón Farrán

José José chronology
El Príncipe (1976)	Reencuentro (1977)	Volcán (1978)

Reencuentro (Reunion) is the title of the studio album released by Mexican singer José José in 1977 and the first for the Ariola label.

Made at the Music Center Studios in London, England, José José returned to the height of his success with the participation of composers such as Juan Carlos Calderón, Rafael Pérez Botija, Roberto Cantoral and Manuel Alejandro.

In addition, José José made his debut as a composer with the song "Si Alguna Vez". Reencuentro contains notable tracks such as "Gavilán o paloma", "Buenos días, amor" and "Amar y querer".

== Track listing ==
1. Recuerdos (Roberto Cantoral)
2. Buenos días, amor (Juan Carlos Calderón)
3. Solo tú (Israel)
4. Te canto sólo a ti (Guillermo Ruiz)
5. Cómo ser diferente (Daniel López)
6. Gavilán o paloma (Rafael Pérez Botija)
7. Si alguna vez (José José)
8. Si no eres tú (Guillermo Ruiz)
9. Amar y querer (Manuel Alejandro/Ana Magdalena)
10. Gotas de fuego (Ramón Ferrán)
- Musical arrangement and direction: Tom Parker

4,8.Ramón Ferrán
