= La Nave del Olvido =

La Nave Del Olvido

Studio album by José José
- Released: 1970 (México)
- Recorded: Mexico
- Genre: Latin pop
- Label: RCA
- Producer: Ignacio González / Rubén Fuentes

José José chronology
José José (1969)	La Nave Del Olvido (1970)	El Triste (1970)

La Nave Del Olvido (Spanish for "the ship of oblivion") is a studio album released by Mexican singer José José in 1970. It includes his breakthrough signature hit "La nave del olvido", written by Dino Ramos.

Other popular songs were "Nadie, simplemente nadie" and "Del altar a la tumba".

This production combined the talent of composers such as Armando Manzanero, Rubén Fuentes, Dino Ramos, Leo Dan, and Leonardo Favio, among others. Furthermore, this album includes the large orchestras of Chucho Ferrer and Eduardo Magallanes.

This album earned José earned a gold and platinum disc for its high sales.

== Track listing ==
1. "La nave del olvido" (Dino Ramos)
2. "El día más triste del mundo" (Armando Manzanero)
3. "Si alguien me dijera" (Armando Manzanero)
4. "Ven y verás" (Ignacio "Nacho" González)
5. "Alguien" (Rubén Fuentes; Martha Roth)
6. "Ella es así" (Rubén Fuente)
7. "Del altar a la tumba" (Armando Manzanero; Luis De Llano)
8. "Y el mundo sigue girando" (Leo Dan; Leonardo Favio; Roberto Lambertucci)
9. "Nadie, simplemente nadie" (Susana Fernández)
10. "Mirar el amor" (Alfonso Ontivero)
11. "Avalancha" (Ignacio "Nacho" González)
12. "Un mundo para ti" (Armando Manzanero)
