= Secretos =

Studio album by José José
- Released: November 29, 1983
- Recorded: 1983
- Studio: Sonoland Studios (Madrid, Spain)
- Genre: Latin pop (80's)
- Length: 43:21
- Label: RCA Ariola
- Producer: Manuel Alejandro

José José chronology
Mi Vida (1982)	Secretos (1983)	Reflexiones (1984)

Professional ratings
Review scores
Source	Rating
Allmusic	4/5 stars

Secretos (Secrets) is the 19th studio album by Mexican performer José José, It was released by RCA Ariola in 1983 (see 1983 in music). It was written, produced and arranged by Manuel Alejandro. Secretos became José José's first collaboration with Manuel Alejandro on album and went on to become the most popular of Jose José's career. One of the all-time best-selling albums in Mexico, sales there vary from an estimated 2 million to as high as 5 million copies. "Secretos" reached the top of the Billboard charts. The album received 22 Platinum and Gold certifications worldwide, and achieved a nomination for Grammy Awards for Best Latin Pop Performance in the 27th Annual Grammy Awards in 1985, losing to Always in My Heart (Siempre en mi Corazón) by Plácido Domingo.

== Track listing ==
All tracks are written by Manuel Alejandro.

No.	Title	Length
1.	"Lo Dudo"	3:41
2.	"El Amor Acaba"	4:20
3.	"Voy a Llenarte Toda"	5:25
4.	"Cuando Vayas Conmigo"	3:55
5.	"Entre Ella y Tu"	3:35
6.	"Lágrimas"	5:15
7.	"He Renunciado a Ti"	3:56
8.	"Quiero Perderme Contigo"	4:58
9.	"Esta Noche te Voy a Estrenar"	5:08
10.	"A esa"	3:03

== Secretos tracks sampled by other artists ==
"Lo Dudo"

In 1998 - U.S. rapper DMX sampled the intro of romantic ballad "Lo Dudo" in his song "Let Me Fly" of which was included in his debut release It's Dark and Hell Is Hot.

In 2005 - Los Angeles Latin Hip-Hop duo Akwid sample the same intro yet this time with vocal audio from the original recording of which was included on their album 'Los Aguacates De Jilquilpan' on the song "Anda Y Ve, Lo Dudo".

"Cuando Vayas Conmigo"

In 1998 - New York rapper Noreaga samples the intro of this romantic ballad in his titled song "It's Not a Game".

== Sales and certifications ==
Region	Certification	Certified units/sales
Mexico Sales as of 1986	—	2,000,000
Mexico (AMPROFON)	2× Platinum	500,000^{‡}
Spain	—	50,000
United States	—	80,000
^{‡} Sales+streaming figures based on certification alone.
