= Los Claxons =

Mexican pop rock band

- Origin: Monterrey, Nuevo León, Mexico
- Genres: Pop; pop rock
- Years active: 2004–present
- Label: Movic Records
- Members: Ignacio "Nacho" Llantada; Mauricio "Sanchez" Sanchez; Pablo Gonzalez Sarre; Cesareo R. Castillo; Edgar "Cholo" Lozano
- Website: www.losclaxons.com

Los Claxons is a Mexican pop rock band from Monterrey, Mexico, initially formed in 2004. Its members include Ignacio Llantada (vocals, guitar, piano), Mauricio Sánchez (vocals, guitar), Edgar "Cholo" Lozano (electric guitar), Pablo Gonzalez Sarre (bass, guitar), and Cesareo Castillo (drums).

== History ==
Los Claxons started playing locally, which resulted in their recognition around Monterrey. Signed to the label Movic Records, released their first album, Sin Ganga, in 2004 where hit singles like "Personajes" and "Mis Manos Necias" led to their wide recognition in Mexico. This first album was recorded at El Cielo recording studios, a joint music studio located within Movic Records.

Ever since, the band has gained great exposure and popularity around Mexico, sharing the stage with artists like Maroon 5. They have recorded over 6 albums including Un Día De Sol co-produced by the band and 16-time Grammy winner, Thom Russo. They also composed songs for the movie Cantinflas alongside other notable artists including Enrique Bunbury, Aleks Syntek, and La Santa Cecilia. In October 2015, Los Claxons released their 6th studio album "Centro, Sur y al Otro Lado" produced solely by them, which debuted #1 on iTunes Mexico and US, was in the Top 3 category of CD sales in Mexico and their single "Hasta Que Vuelvas a Verme" charted within the Top 5 chart in Mexican radio.

Los Claxons is currently recording their 7th studio album "Maldita Felicidad". Their first single from this upcoming album was released on radio 16 April and in digital platforms on 20 April. The single instantly charted on Spotify playlists and is currently on the Top 20 on national radio.

The band has been nominated for two Latin Grammys:

– Best Pop Album (2010)

– Best Pop/Rock Album (2012)

== Discography ==
"Tómame" was their first ever released single.

=== Sin Ganga ===
Sin Ganga

Studio album by Los Claxons
- Released: 2005
- Length: 37:07
- Language: Spanish
- Label: Movic Records
- Producer: Guillermo Gil (10 tracks), Adrian Treviño (2 tracks)

No.	Title	Length
1.	"Ultramar"	4:18
2.	"Tómame"	3:05
3.	"María"	4:22
4.	"Jackie"	3:21
5.	"Fuera"	3:15
6.	"La Rumana"	3:32
7.	"Bombones"	3:20
8.	"Pastel"	3:26
9.	"West"	3:23
10.	"El Aire"	4:31

=== Sin Ganga (Edición Especial) ===
Sin Ganga (Edición Especial)

Studio album by Los Claxons
- Released: 2006
- Length: 43:42
- Language: Spanish
- Label: Movic Records
- Producer: Guillermo Gil (10 tracks), Adrian Treviño (2 tracks)

No.	Title	Length
1.	"Ultramar"	4:18
2.	"Tómame"	3:05
3.	"María"	4:22
4.	"Jackie"	3:21
5.	"Fuera"	3:15
6.	"La Rumana"	3:32
7.	"Bombones"	3:20
8.	"Pastel"	3:26
9.	"West"	3:23
10.	"El Aire"	4:31
11.	"Personajes" (Jam Session)	3:22
12.	"Mis Manos Necias" (Jam Session)	3:12

=== En Primera ===
En Primera

Studio album by Los Claxons
- Released: 2007
- Length: 51:08
- Language: Spanish
- Label: Movic Records
- Producer: Adrián "Rojo" Treviño, Los Claxons

No.	Title	Length
1.	"Acompañándonos"	3:57
2.	"Los Ángeles"	3:16
3.	"Tu Sonrisa"	3:42
4.	"Plan Perfecto"	3:26
5.	"Sin Ver Atrás"	4:20
6.	"Folkie Lovin'"	3:43
7.	"Crónica De Un Beso"	3:53
8.	"Estoy En El Aire"	3:52
9.	"Artificial"	3:24
10.	"Playa Maguadel"	4:06
11.	"Lágrimas De Más"	3:30
12.	"Leidelay"	3:22
13.	"De Perfil"	3:18
14.	"Así Pasa El Día Aquí"	3:19

=== Los Claxons ===
Los Claxons

Studio album by Los Claxons
- Released: 2010
- Length: 46:44
- Language: Spanish
- Label: Movic Records
- Producer: Baltazar "Balta" Hinojosa, Los Claxons

No.	Title	Length
1.	"Tal Vez Me Estoy Tomando El Pelo"	3:08
2.	"Volcán"	4:14
3.	"Más Grande Que El Sol"	3:06
4.	"Préstame Atención"	3:47
5.	"Tus Maletas"	3:21
6.	"Invierno"	3:38
7.	"En El Mismo Lugar"	3:57
8.	"Adiós"	3:45
9.	"Ahí Fue Cuándo"	3:35
10.	"Primeros Auxilios"	2:52
11.	"Buscando Casa"	3:34
12.	"Los Claxons"	3:47
13.	"Enero"	3:58

=== Camino A Encontrarte ===
Camino A Encontrarte

Studio album by Los Claxons
- Released: 2011
- Length: 48:55
- Language: Spanish
- Label: Movic Records
- Producer: Baltazar "Balta" Hinojosa, Los Claxons, and Kiko Lobo

No.	Title	Length
1.	"Ella Y Yo"	3:37
2.	"Este Mundo Sin Tí"	3:42
3.	"Ya Me Cansé"	3:13
4.	"Ahí Estaré"	3:24
5.	"Menos De Tí"	3:40
6.	"Hasta Mañana ft. Beto Zapata"	3:53
7.	"Camino A Encontrarte"	4:49
8.	"Antes Que Al Mío"	3:02
9.	"Flores En Febrero"	3:32
10.	"Llegaste"	4:03
11.	"Día De Muertos"	3:54
12.	"Un Ratito ft. Telepathic Tedddy"	6:12
13.	"Cualquier Forma De Amor (bonus track)"	4:04

=== Un Día De Sol ===
Un Día De Sol

Studio album by Los Claxons
- Released: 2013
- Length: 50:55
- Language: Spanish
- Label: Movic Records
- Producer: Thom Russo, Los Claxons

No.	Title	Length
1.	"Sin Fin"	3:58
2.	"Un Día De Sol"	3:42
3.	"Salpicándonos"	3:46
4.	"Me Voy A Tomar La Noche"	3:24
5.	"Díganle Que Estoy Bien"	3:37
6.	"Empieza Hoy"	3:58
7.	"Igual Que Ayer"	4:04
8.	"Acuérdate De Mi"	4:10
9.	"Orden Natural"	3:28
10.	"Te Voy A Dejar Ir"	3:42
11.	"Tú"	3:47

=== Diez En Vivo (Live) ===
Diez En Vivo

Live album by Los Claxons
- Released: 2015
- Length: 51:08
- Language: Spanish
- Label: Movic Records
- Producer: Los Claxons

No.	Title	Length
1.	"Te Voy A Dejar Ir"	4:44
2.	"Ya Me Cansé"	3:57
3.	"Díganle Que Estoy Bien"	4:25
4.	"Solo De Pablo"	2:17
5.	"Así Se Pasa El Día Aquí"	7:41
6.	"Tal Vez Me Estoy Tomando El Pelo"	4:16
7.	"Orden Natural"	5:18
8.	"Me Voy A Tomar La Noche"	5:39
9.	"Playa Maguadel"	5:45
10.	"Antes Que Al Mío"	2:58
11.	"Este Mundo Sin Ti"	4:41

=== Centro, Sur y Al Otro Lado ===
Centro, Sur y Al Otro Lado

Studio album by Los Claxons
- Released: 2015
- Length: 45:00
- Language: Spanish
- Label: Movic Records
- Producer: Los Claxons

No.	Title	Length
1.	"Hasta Que Vuelvas A Verme"	3:02
2.	"Heridas (Aunque No Seas Mía)"	3:31
3.	"Canciones De Amor"	3:25
4.	"5 Segundos"	3:42
5.	"Hasta Que El Amor Nos Deje Descansar"	3:38
6.	"Cautiverio"	4:08
7.	"Isabel"	3:46
8.	"Para Volar"	3:20
9.	"Me Vuelves Loco"	3:51
10.	"Aquí Cabemos Los Dos"	4:05
11.	"La Posibilidad"	3:53
12.	"Al Otro Lado"	4:00

=== Maldita felicidad ===
Maldita felicidad

Studio album by Los Claxons
- Released: 2018
- Length: 42:00
- Language: Spanish
- Label: Movic Records
- Producer: Los Claxons

No.	Title	Length
1.	"Maldita felicidad"	2:48
2.	"Tu y yo"	2:55
3.	"Te propongo"	4:07
4.	"Viviendo en vano"	3:52
5.	"Respiro"	3:28
6.	"Diez beso más"	3:02
7.	"Te doy"	3:02
8.	"Lástima por ti"	2:56
9.	"Cuarto de hotel"	2:45
10.	"Amándote"	3:44
11.	"Me voy"	3:28
12.	"Bonita"	2:58
13.	"Cada paso que doy"	3:16
