= Volcán (album) =

Studio album by José José
- Released: February 24, 1978 (México)
- Genre: Latin pop
- Label: Ariola
- Producer: Rafael Pérez Botija, José José

José José chronology
| Reencuentro (1977) | Volcán (1978) | Lo Pasado, Pasado (1979) |

Volcán (Volcano) is the title of the studio album released by Mexican singer José José in 1978. The arranger and director of all the songs was the Spanish composer Rafael Pérez Botija.

== Track listing ==
1. "Volcán" (Pérez Botija)
2. "O tú o yo" (Honorio Herrero, Luis Gómez-Escolar, Julio Seijas)
3. "Amor lo que se dice" (Pérez Botija)
4. "Amándote" (Manuel Soto)
5. "Pregúntaselo a ella" (Pérez Botija)
6. "Solo los pájaros" (Honorio Herrero, Luis Gómez-Escolar, Julio Seijas)
7. "Jaque mate" (Manuel Soto)
8. "Por una sonrisa" (Pérez Botija)
9. "Liberame" (Lazaro Muñiz, Armando Martinez)
10. "Farolero" (Pérez Botija)

== Personnel ==
- Lyrics & Music: Rafael Pérez Botija (except as noted)
- Arrangement: Rafael Pérez Botija
