= Gracias (album) =

Studio album by José José
- Released: November 24, 1981 (México)
- Recorded: 1981
- Genre: Pop
- Label: Ariola
- Producers: Rafael Pérez Botija, José José

José José chronology
Romántico (1981)	Gracias (1981)	Mi Vida (1982)

Gracias (Thanks) is the title of the studio album released by Mexican singer José José in 1981. The main hits of the album were: "Gracias", "Una noche de amor", "Sólo tú y yo" (Grover Washington, Jr.'s "Just the Two of Us"), "Preso", "Vamos a darnos tiempo" and "Me basta".

== Track listing ==
No.	Title	Writer(s)	Length
1.	"Gracias"	Rafael Pérez Botija	3:05
2.	"Una Noche de Amor"	Potro	3:15
3.	"No Puedes Mentirme"	Alejandro Jaén	4:43
4.	"Pero Me Hiciste Tuyo"	J.M. Gallardo	4:14
5.	"Sólo Tú y Yo"		4:58
6.	"Preso"	Rafael Pérez Botija	3:47
7.	"Vamos a Darnos Tiempo"	Alejandro Jaén	4:11
8.	"Ámame"	Gil Rivera	3:22
9.	"Me Basta"	Rafael Pérez Botija	3:50
10.	"Tranquilo"	Alejandro Jaén	4:40
