= Si Me Dejas Ahora =

Studio album by José José
- Released: October 30, 1979 (México)
- Genre: Latin pop
- Label: Ariola
- Producer: Camilo Sesto, José José

José José chronology
Lo Pasado, Pasado (1979)	Si Me Dejas Ahora (1979)	Amor Amor (1980)

Si Me Dejas Ahora (If you leave me now) is the title of the studio album released by Mexican singer José José in 1979.

José José produced an album for the first time in collaboration with Spanish singer, composer and producer Camilo Sesto.

It became one of the most successful and best selling albums of José José's career, continuing his run of success. The singles "Si me dejas ahora", "Mientras llueve", "Franqueza", "Tu primera vez" and "Será" instantly became hits.

== Track listing ==
1. Mientras llueve (José María Napoleón)
2. Será (Manuel Alejandro)
3. Candy (José José-Steve Jerome)
4. Franqueza (Consuelo Velazquez)
5. Rosa de fuego (Rafael Pérez Botija)
6. Si me dejas ahora (Camilo Blanes)
7. He sido (Mario Patrón-Eduardo Salas)
8. Donde vas (Camilo Blanes)
9. Tu primera vez (José María Napoleón)
10. Linda disco (Hermanos Zepeda Novelo-José José)

== Musical direction and arrangement ==
- 1,2,3,9: Tom Parker
- 4,7,10: Mario Patrón
- 6,8,: D'Arniell Pershing
- 5: Rene de Copeau
