= Reflexiones (José José album) =

Studio album by José José
- Released: November 13, 1984
- Recorded: 1984
- Studio: One On One Studios (North Hollywood, California); Gramola Studios (Madrid, Spain)
- Genre: Latin pop
- Length: 32:02
- Label: RCA Ariola
- Producer: Rafael Pérez-Botija

José José chronology
Secretos (1983)	Reflexiones (1984)	Promesas (1985)

Professional ratings
Review scores
Source	Rating
Allmusic	3/5 stars

Reflexiones (Reflections) is the 20th studio album recorded by Mexican performer José José, It was released by RCA Ariola in 1984. It was written, produced and arranged by Spanish producer Rafael Pérez-Botija. This album became the first number-one set on the Billboard Latin Pop Albums, received a platinum certification in Mexico for sales of 250,000 units, and at the Grammy Awards of 1986 it was nominated for Grammy Awards for Best Latin Pop Performance losing to Es Fácil Amar by Lani Hall.

== Track listing ==
All tracks are written by Rafael Pérez-Botija

No.	Title	Length
1.	"Payaso"	3:02
2.	"Seré"	3:14
3.	"Adiós Princesa"	4:06
4.	"Tu Ganas"	3:02
5.	"Toda Mía"	3:08
6.	"De Hombre a Hombre"	3:05
7.	"Disimula"	3:09
8.	"¿Y Qué?"	3:09
9.	"¿Estás Segura?"	3:21
10.	"¿Qué Hay de Malo en Ser Extraños?"	3:15

== Personnel ==
- Rafael Perez Botija – Arranger, Director, Producer, Direction, Realization
- José José – Interpretation

== Chart performance ==
Chart (1985)	Peak position
US Billboard Latin Pop Albums	1

== See also ==
- List of Billboard Latin Pop Albums number ones from the 1980s
