= Music of Mexico =

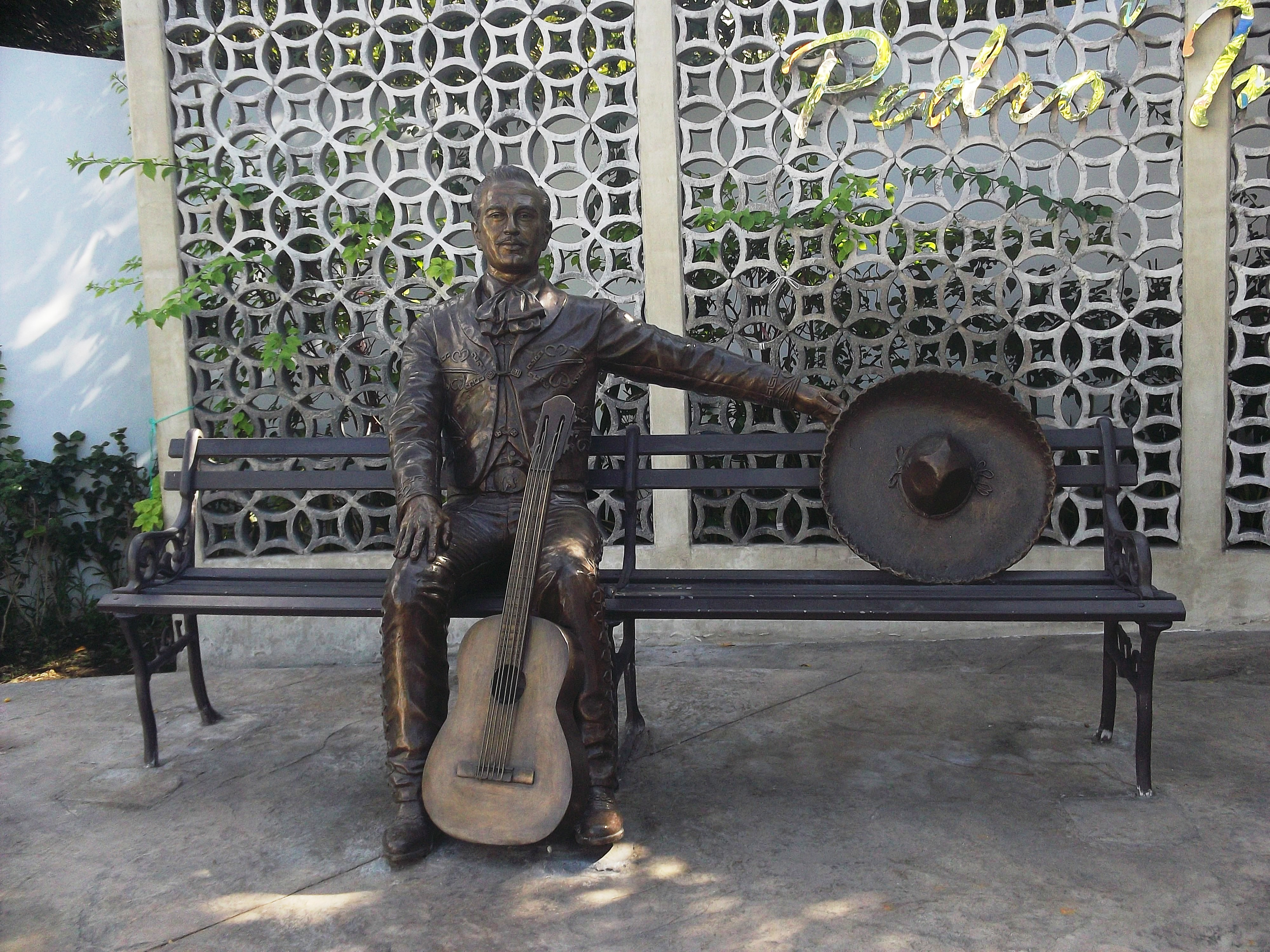
The statue of Pedro Infante in Mérida, Yucatán is a tribute to one of the 'Three Mexican Roosters' of Mexican music, along with Jorge Negrete and Javier Solís.

The music of Mexico is highly diverse, featuring a wide range of musical genres and performance styles. It has been influenced by a variety of cultures, primarily deriving from Europeans, Indigenous, and Africans. Music became an expression of Mexican nationalism starting in the nineteenth century.

In the 21st century, Mexico has ranked as the world's tenth-largest recorded music market and the largest in the Spanish-speaking world, according to IFPI's 2024 and 2002 reports.

== History ==
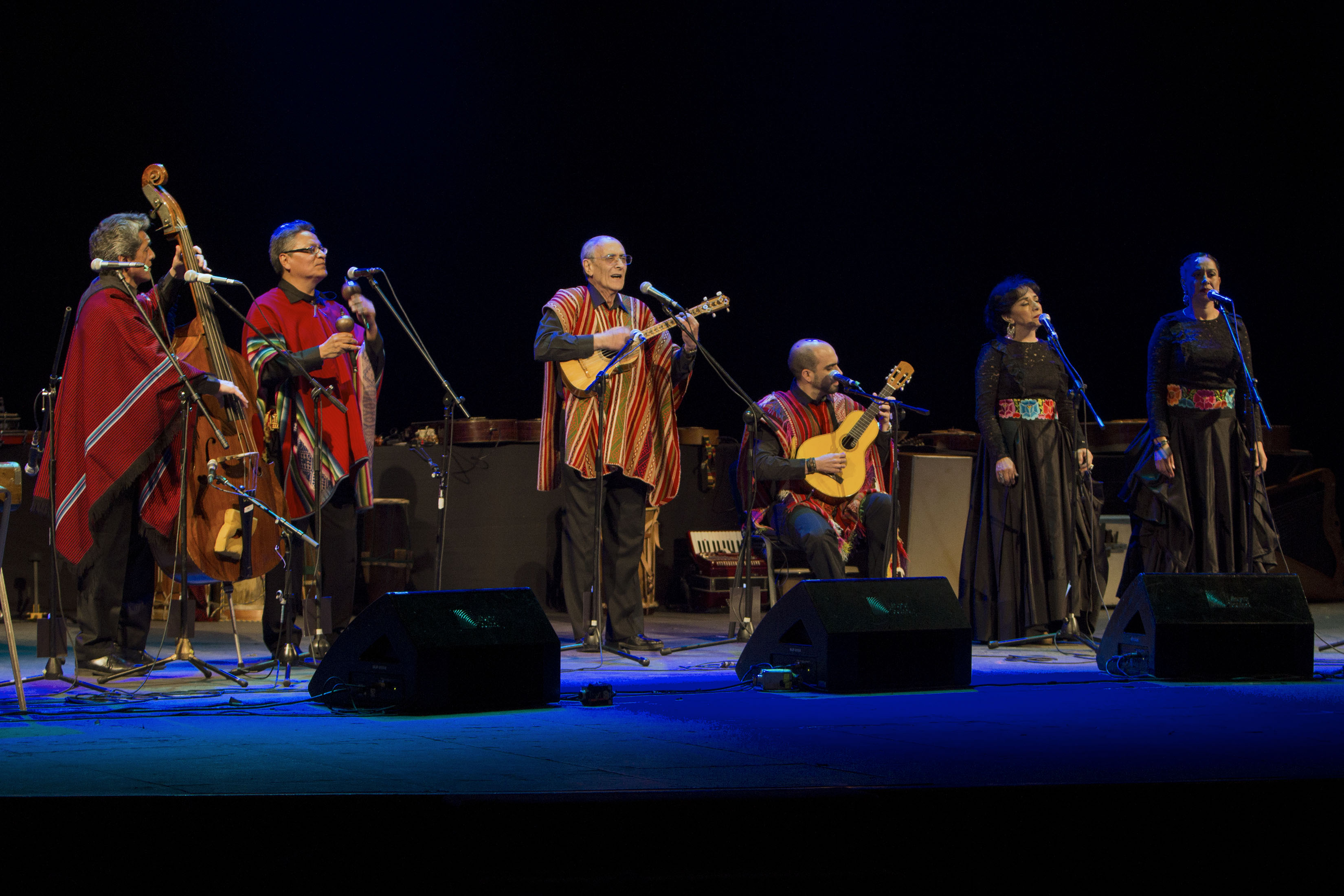
Los Folkloristas a musical group formed in Mexico City in 1966 and dedicated to the research, execution, and dissemination of traditional Latin American music. Since its creation, almost fifty musicians have passed through the group.

The foundation of Mexican music comes from its indigenous sounds and heritage. The original inhabitants of the land used drums (such as the teponaztli), flutes, rattles, conches as trumpets and their voices to make music and dances. This ancient music is still played in some parts of Mexico. However, much of the traditional contemporary music of Mexico was written during and after the Spanish colonial period, using many Old World influenced instruments. Many traditional instruments, such as the Mexican vihuela used in Mariachi music, were adapted from their old-world predecessors and are now considered very Mexican.

There existed regional and local musical traditions in the colonial period and earlier, but national music began to develop in the nineteenth century, often with patriotic themes of national defense and against foreign invaders. Conservative general and president Antonio López de Santa Anna brought Catalan musician Jaime Nunó from nearby Cuba to create a network of military bands on a national scale. He composed the music for the Mexican national anthem. During the French Intervention in Mexico, which placed Maximilian of Habsburg on the throne of the French empire in Mexico, many musicians accompanied his entourage and he established the National Conservatory of Music in 1866.

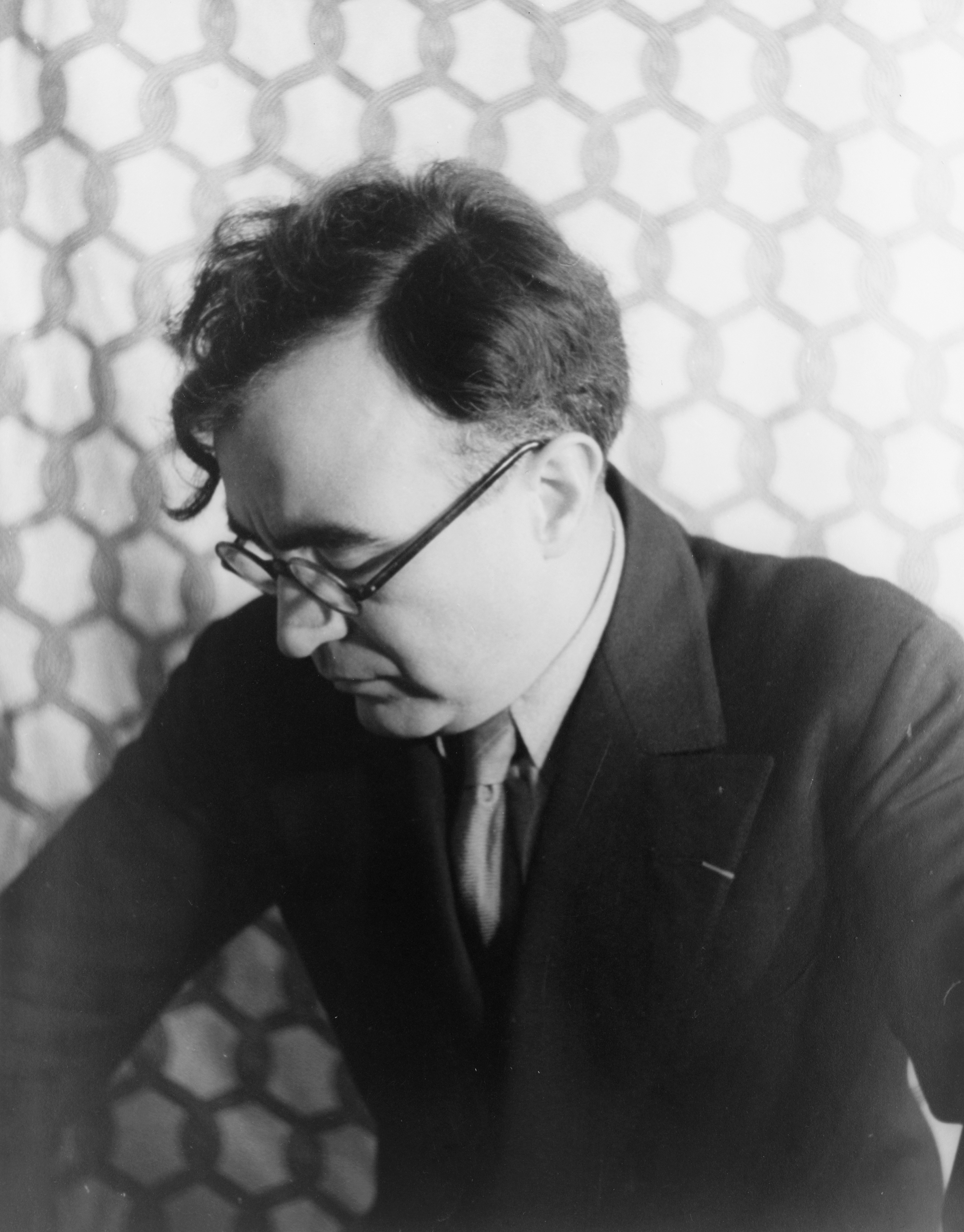
Carlos Chávez, composer

Liberal President Benito Juárez saw the need to create military bands. Village brass bands proliferated in the late nineteenth century, with concerts in town squares, often on a central kiosk. During the Porfiriato, musical styles expanded, with Mexican national music, cosmopolitan music brought by foreign elites, and European regional music such as polkas, mazurkas, and waltzes, as well as opera overtures. Musicians had access to and used sheet music. In some indigenous regions, new music and bands helped bring a level of unity. In Oaxaca, a waltz, "Dios nunca muere" (God never dies) became the state's anthem. A variety of musical styles from elsewhere were incorporated into Mexican popular music in the nineteenth century. Music, dance, and poetry flourished during the Porfiriato. Mexico's National Conservatory of Music was strongly influenced by Italian masters, who gave way to French influence at the turn of the twentieth century.

Following the Revolution, Venustiano Carranza, leader of the winning Constitutionalist faction of the Revolution, mandated that the National Conservatory "recover the national" in its musical education, abandoning rather than privileging foreign music. Younger Mexican composers emerged, including Carlos Chávez, Silvestre Revueltas, and Luis Sandi, who developed Mexican "art music." Chávez was a prolific composer and one who embraced creating Mexican orchestral music drawing on revolutionary corridos, and composed an Aztec-themed ballet. He became the director of the National Conservatory of Music, which became affiliated with the Ministry of Education (SEP). Revueltas composed music for the emerging Mexican cinema, and Sandi created choral works, creating music for civic events, as well as incorporating indigenous music from the Yaqui and Maya regions in his compositions. Chávez is seen as the driving force behind the split between Mexican art music and traditional styles, privileging art music. However, traditional or folkloric music continues to be popular, and the Ballet Folklórico de México, established in 1952, performs regularly at Bellas Artes.

== Traditional folk music ==
=== Northern Mexican folk music ===
Northern traditional music or Norteño was highly influenced by immigrants from Germany, Poland, and Czechia to northern Mexico and the southwestern United States in the mid 1800s, the instruments and musical styles of the Central European immigrants were adopted to Mexican folk music, the accordion becoming especially popular and is still frequently used. There are many styles of northern mexican folk music, among the most popular being Ranchera, Corrido, Huapango, Chotís, Polka, Redova, Cumbia and Banda. Norteño folk music is some of the most popular music in and out of Mexico, with Corridos and Rancheras being specifically popular in Chile, Colombia, United States, Central America and Spain.

Northern Mexico music instruments
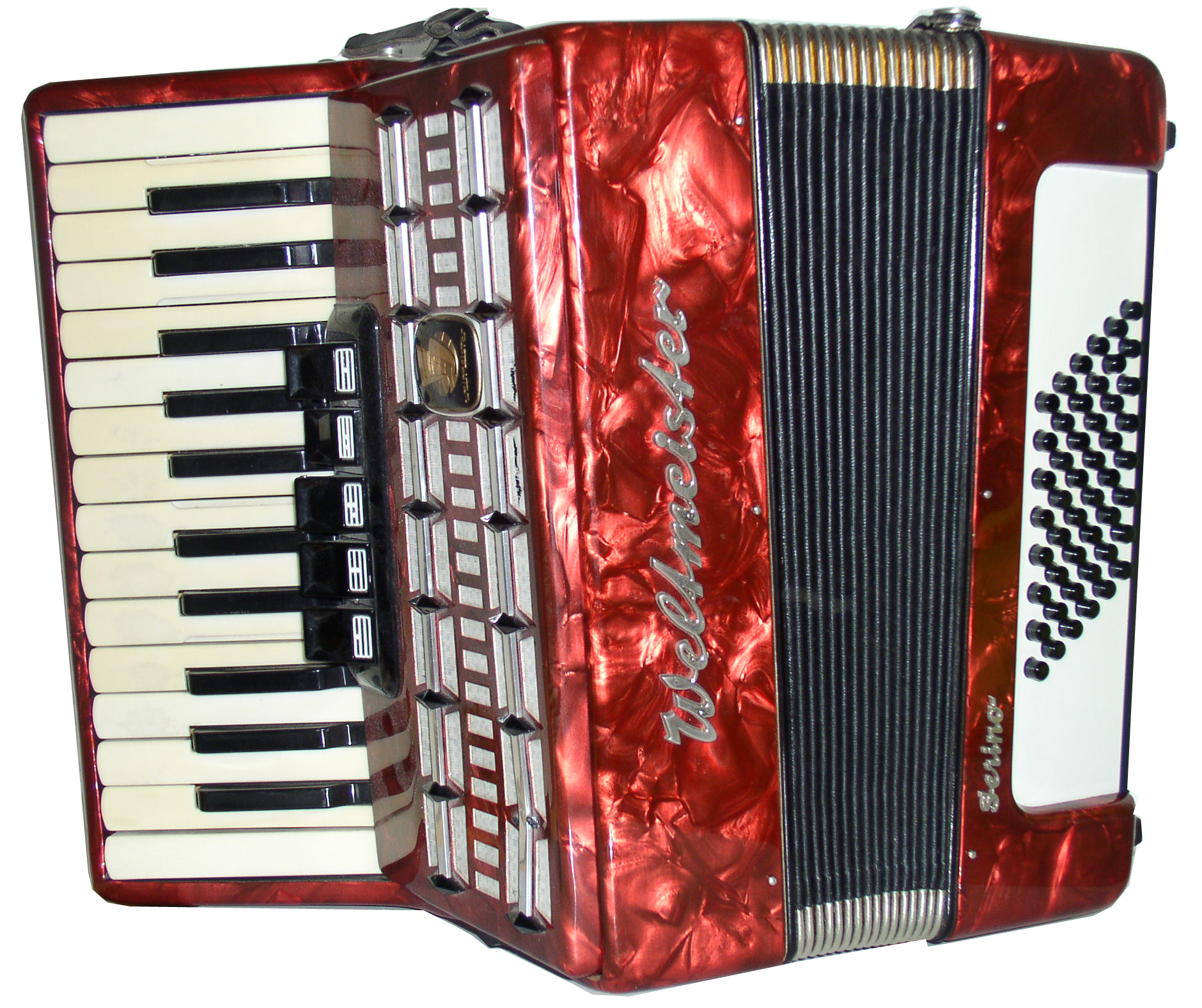
Accordion

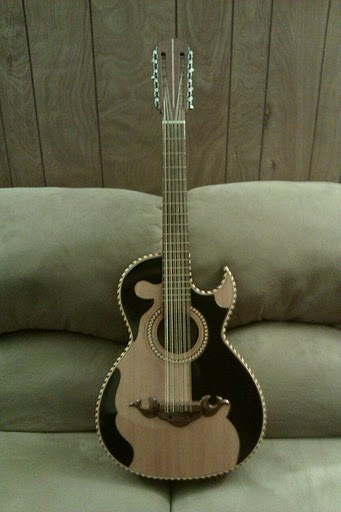
Bajo sexto, Mexican string instrument

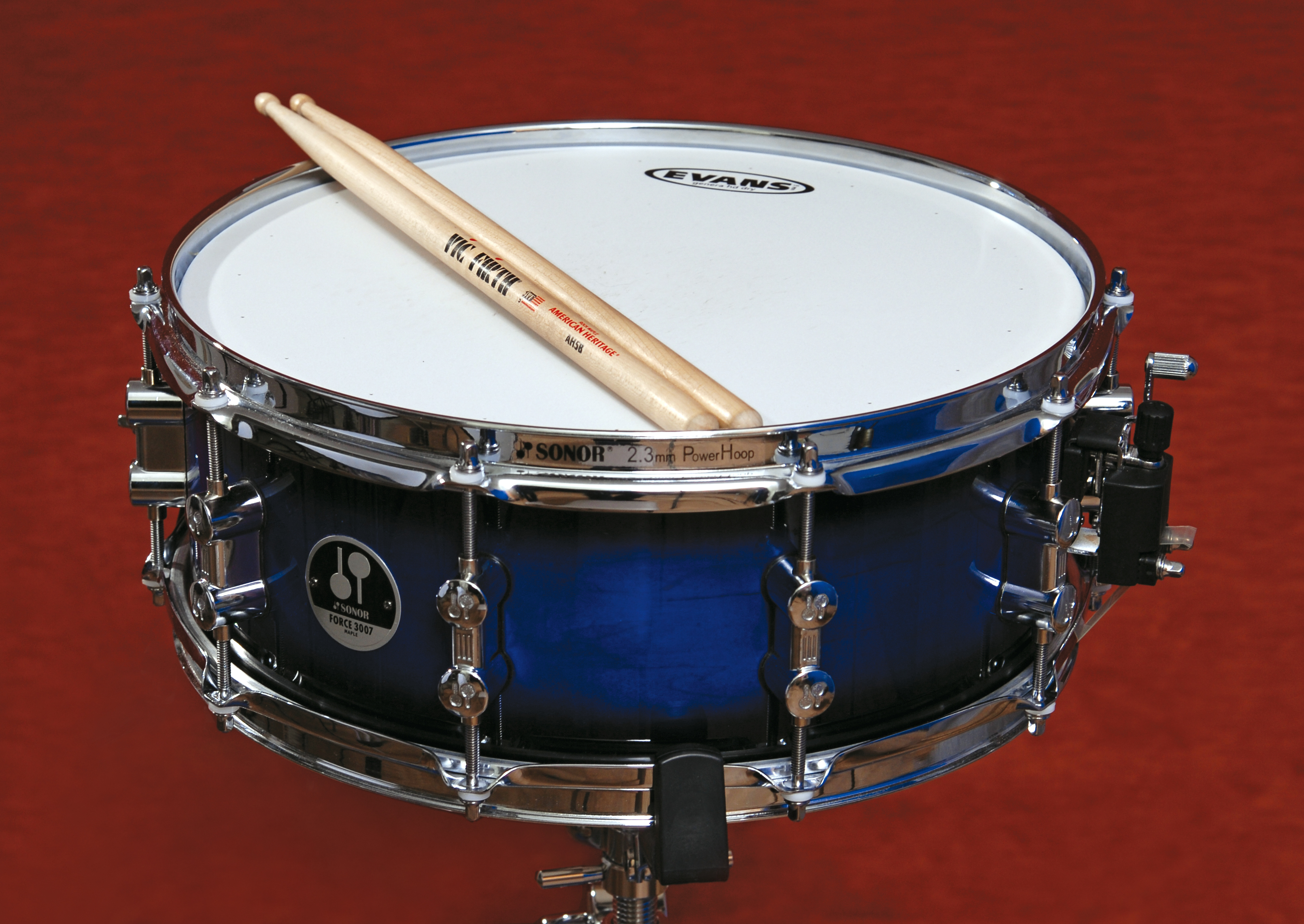
Snare drum

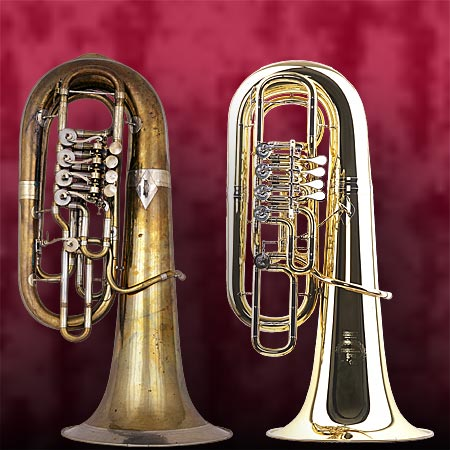
Tuba

==== Genres ====
- Corrido: Corrido music is a popular narrative song of poetry form, a ballad. Various themes are featured in Mexican corridos, and corrido lyrics are often old legends (stories) about a famed criminal or hero in the rural frontier areas of Mexico. There are also corridos about women (La Venganza de Maria, Laurita Garza, La tragedia de Rosita, and La Adelita), and corridos telling love stories.
- Ranchera: Ranchera music, whose term derives from ranch (farm for raising livestock, typical of the southern United States and Mexico; in Spanish it's called "rancho"), usually has a rhythm in 2/4 (the ranchera corrido or polka), 3/4 (ranchera valsada) or 4/4 (ranchera romantica), with songs typically in a major key. Generally the most appreciated and important exponent of this genre is considered José Alfredo Jiménez.
- Banda: Banda music was made with the imitation of military bands that were imported during the Second Mexican Empire, headed by emperor Maximilian I of Mexico in the 1860s. Polish and German immigrants established themselves in the state of Sinaloa. It was further popularized during the Mexican Revolution when local authorities and states formed their own bands to play in the town squares. Revolutionary leaders like Pancho Villa, also took wind bands with them wherever they went. Banda has to this day remained popular throughout the central and northern states. It has, however, diversified into different styles due to regions, instruments and modernization. Today people associate banda with Sinaloense. Although banda music is played by many bands from different parts of Mexico, its original roots are in Sinaloa, made popular by bands from Sinaloa.

=== Central Mexican folk music ===
The folklore in central Mexico retains strong Spanish influence which can be seen in the amount of colonial cities in this region like Guanajuato, San Miguel de Allende and Zacatecas and also the instruments utilized in the folk music such as guitars, violins and vihuelas. The most iconic figure from central Mexico is the Mexican charro, a kind of horseman originated in Jalisco in the early 1900s. In Central Mexico, The most characteristic style of folk music is Mariachi, a style which is played by a group consisting of five or more musicians who wear charro suits and play various instruments such as the violin, the vihuela, guitar, a guitarrón and a trumpet with lyricism usually being about love, betrayal, death, politics, revolutionary heroes and country life.

Central Mexico music instruments
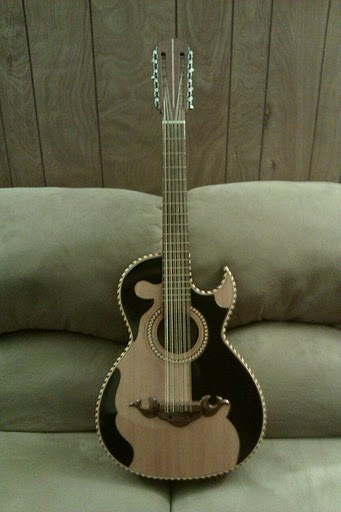
Bajo sexto, Mexican string instrument

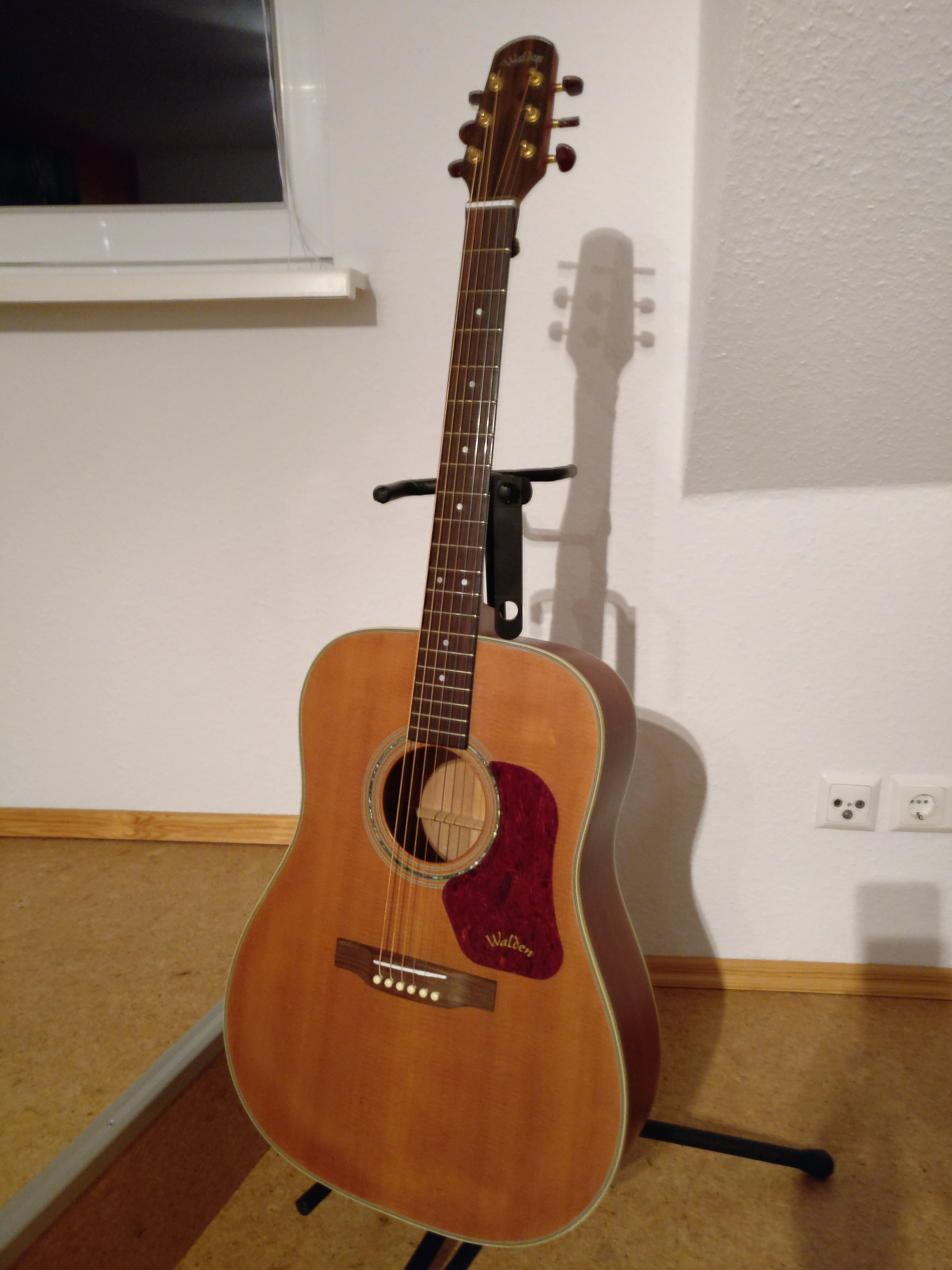
Guitar

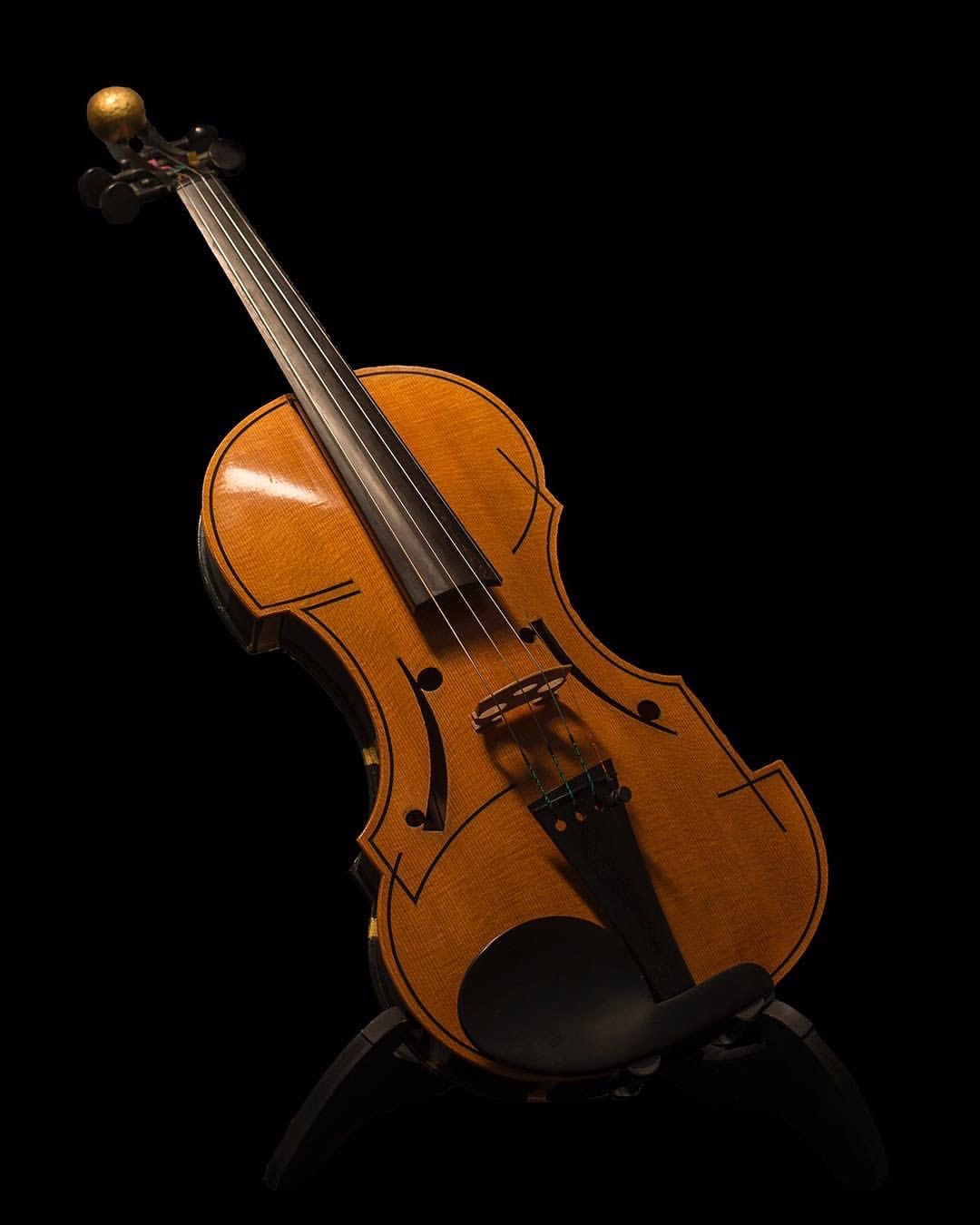
Violin

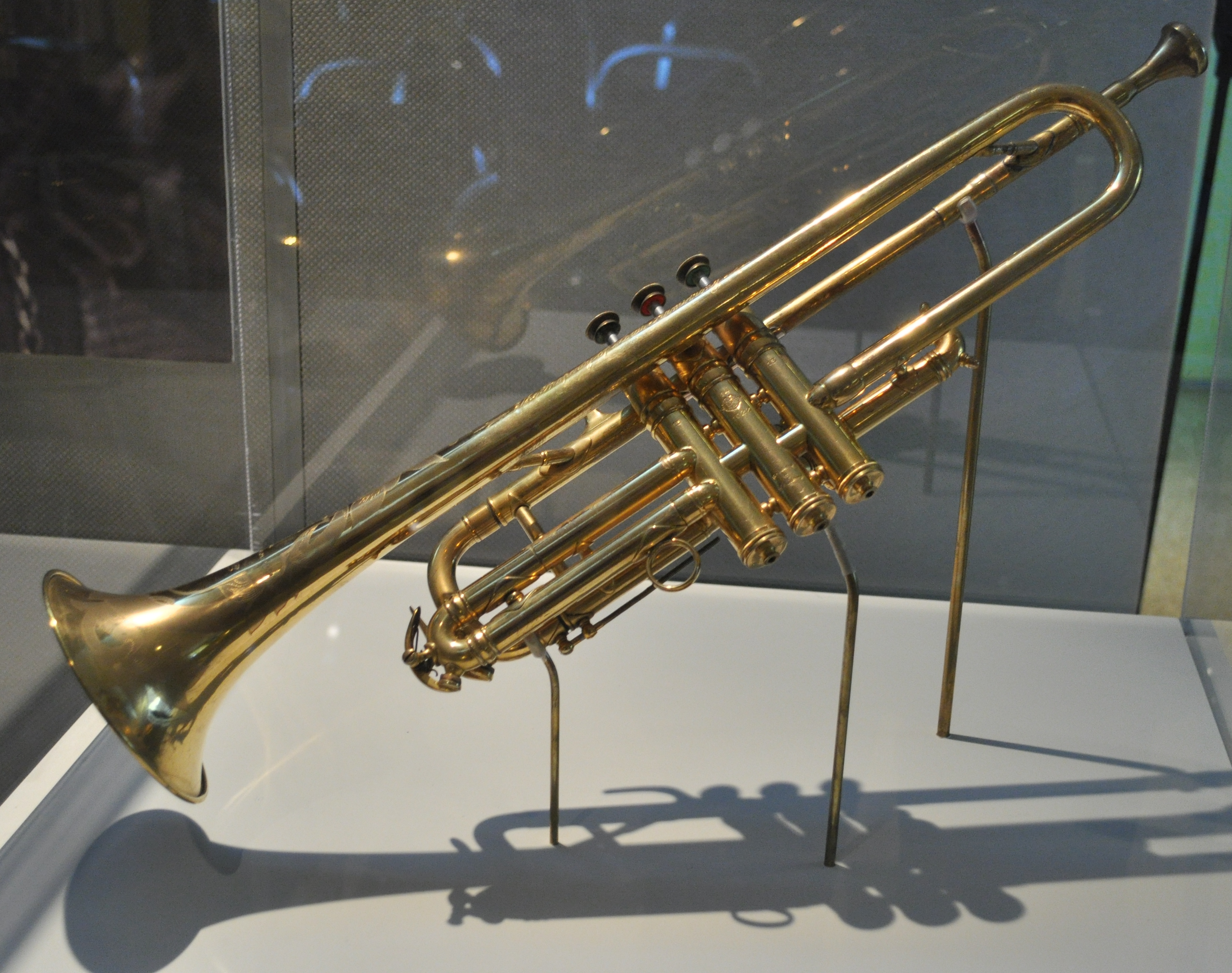
Trumpet

==== Genres ====
- Mariachi: Mariachi is an ensemble that consists of guitarrón, vihuela, guitar, violins and trumpets. Between 1940 and 1960 mariachi and rancheras originated in the western states of the country. This folk ensemble performs ranchera, son de mariachi, huapango de mariachi, polka, corrido, and other musical forms. It originated in the southern part of the state of Jalisco during the 19th century. The city of Guadalajara in Jalisco is known as the "Capital of Mariachi". The style is now popular throughout Mexico and the Southwestern United States, and is considered representative of Mexican music and culture.
- Tamborazo Zacatecano: Tamborazo Zacatecano ("drum-beat from Zacatecas") is a banda style traditionally played by two trumpets, two saxophones, and the al bass drum. Tamborazo is closely related to traditional brass Banda. However, Tamborazo uses saxophones instead of clarinets. Another difference from banda is that Tamborazo uses its drum consistently, as opposed to banda which distributes the use of the other instruments throughout a song. Tamborazo originated in Villanueva in the state of Zacatecas.

=== Southern Mexican folk music ===
The south of Mexico is often characterized by a strong mixture of different cultures since this region has some of the most important port cities of the country like Veracruz and Acapulco which functioned as an entry way for immigrants from Europe, Africa, The Middle East, South America, the Caribbean and Asia. Some of the most known folk music in southern Mexico are Son Jarocho from Veracruz, Chilena from the Costa Chica regions in Guerrero and Oaxaca, Jarana Yucateca from the Yucatan Peninsula, Bolero from Yucatan and Veracruz and Abajeño from Michoacán.

Southern Mexican musical instruments
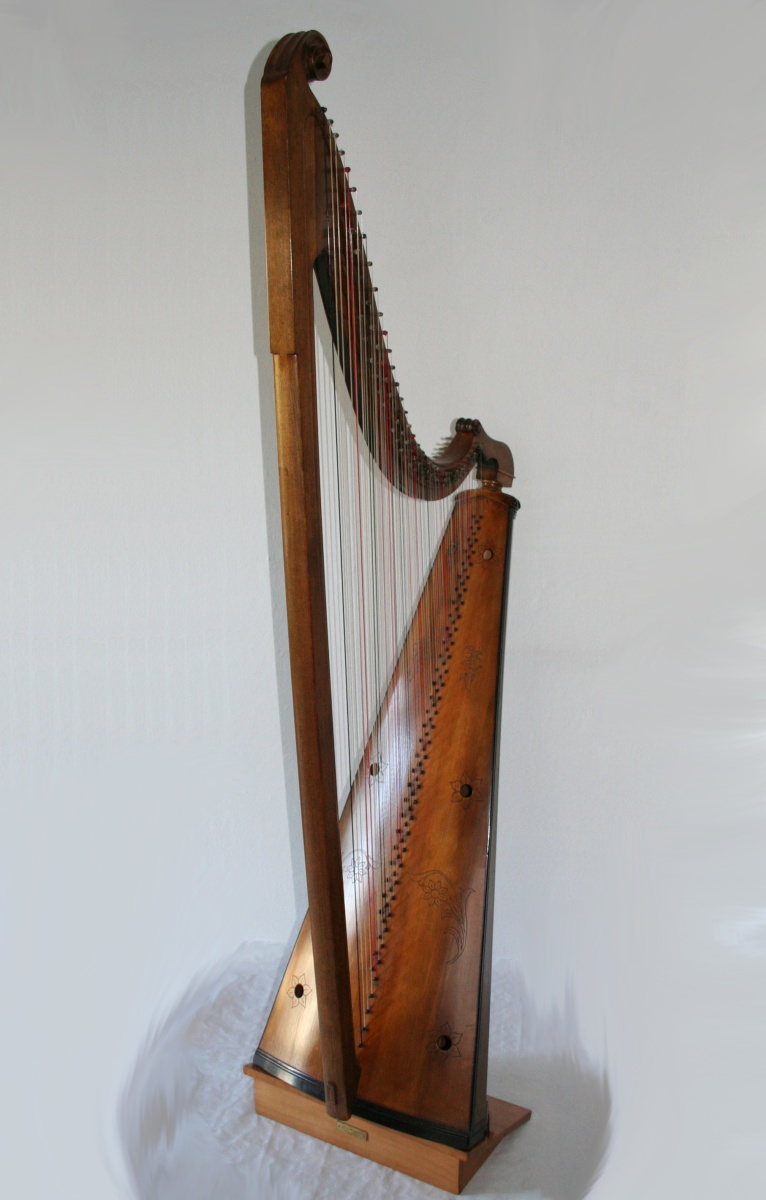
Harp

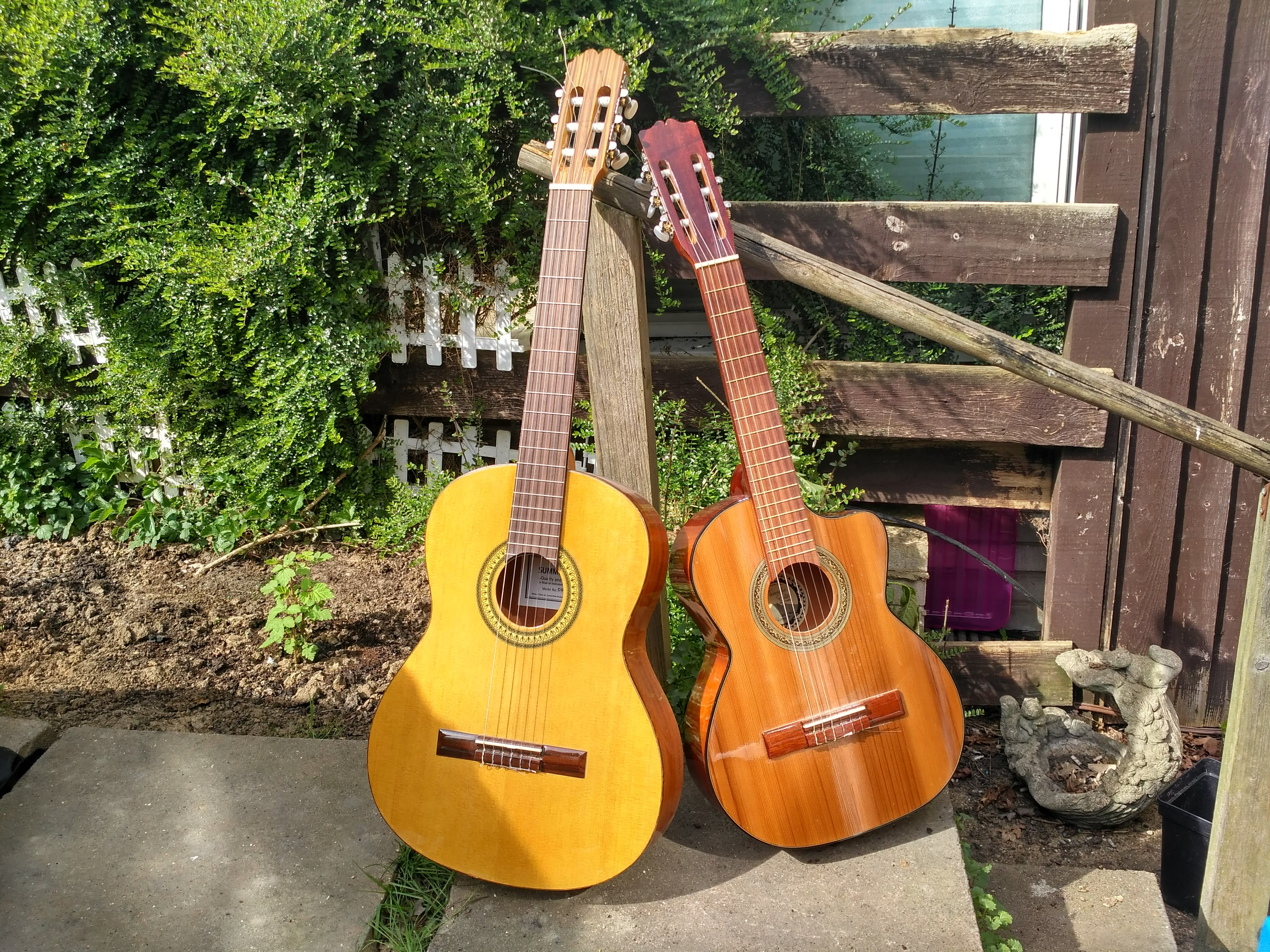
Classical and Requinto guitars

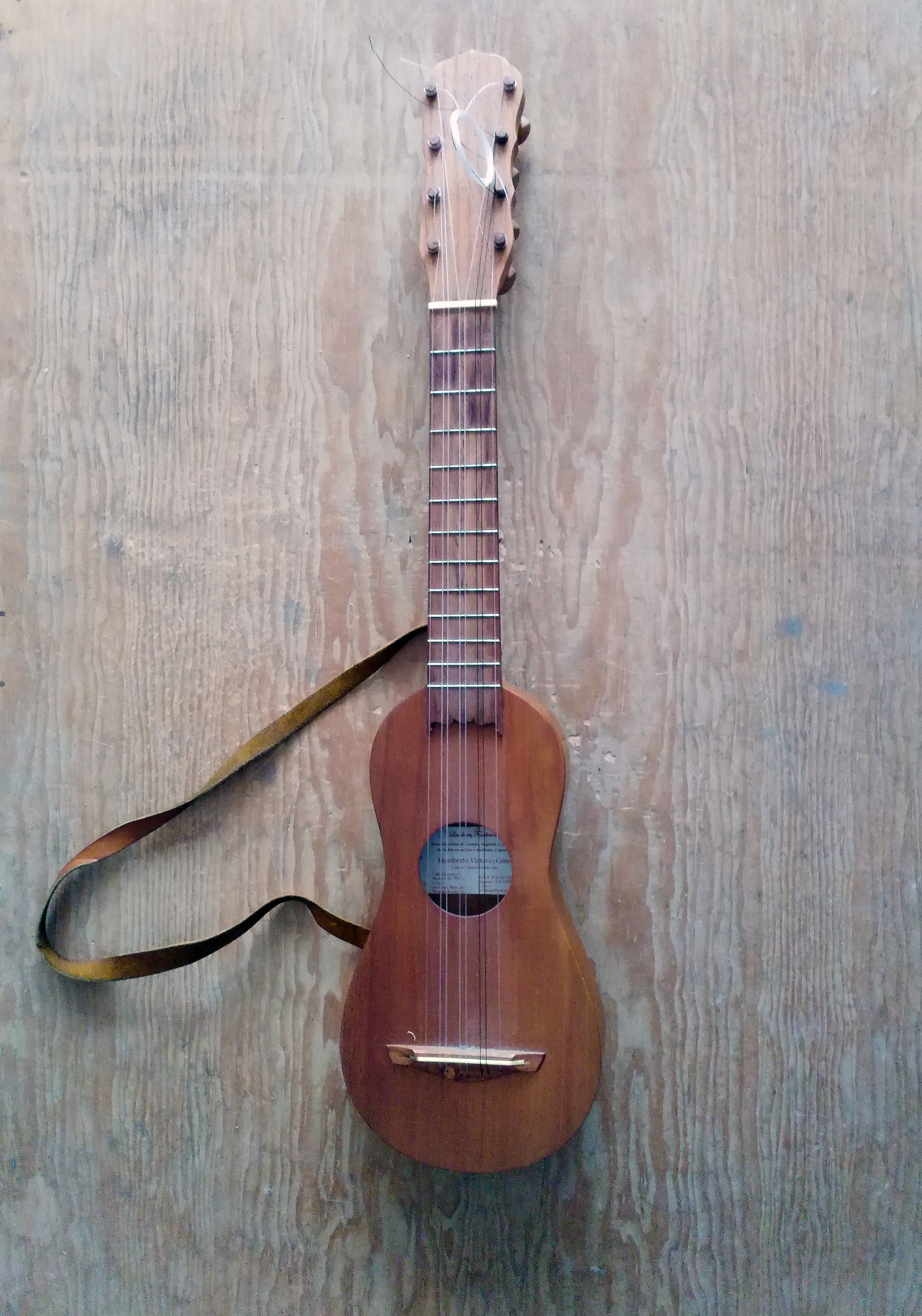
Jarana jarocha

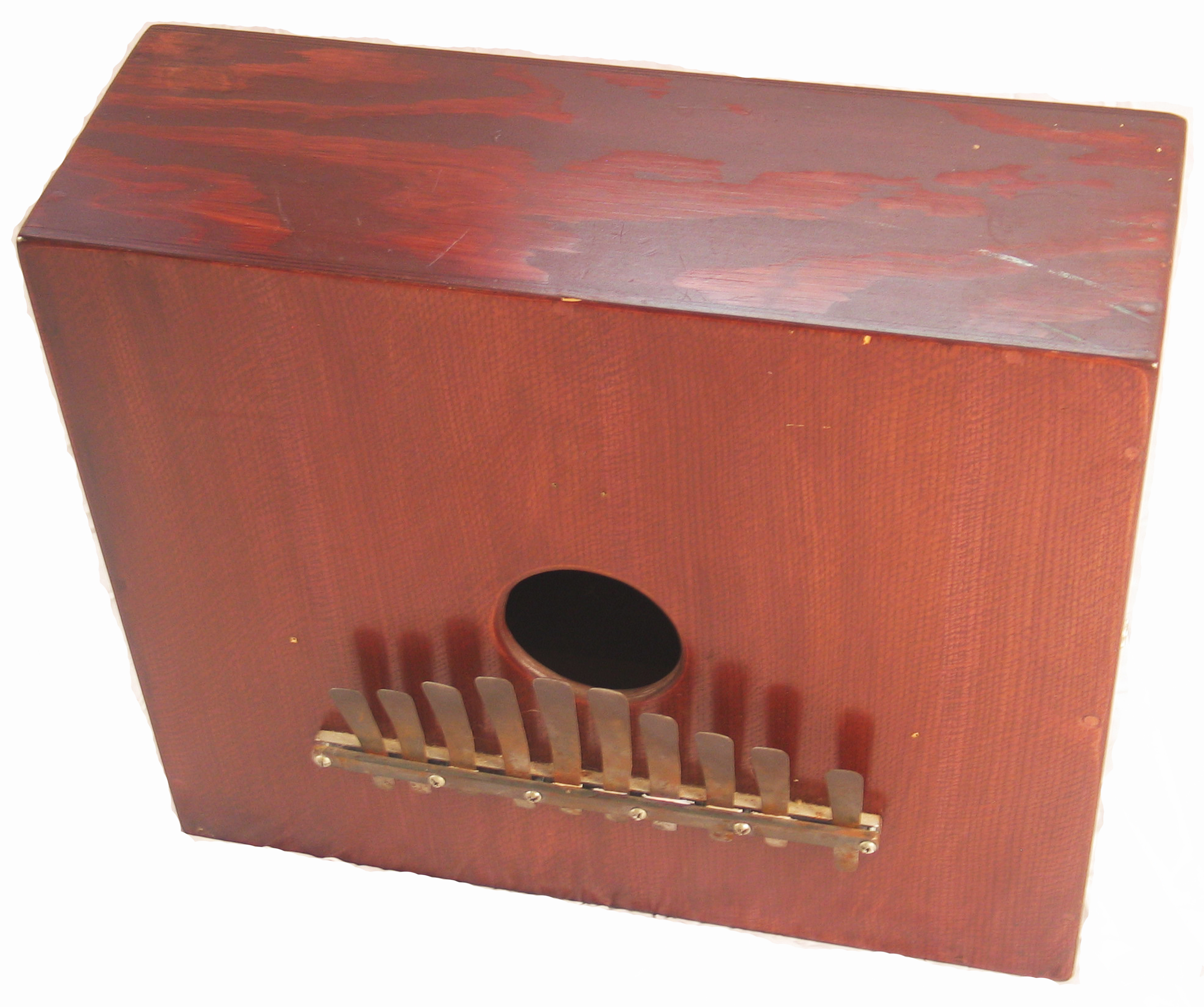
Marímbula

==== Genres ====
- Son Jarocho: Son Jarocho music comes from the Veracruz area, and is distinguished by a strong African influence. International acclaim has been limited, including the major hit La Bamba. The most legendary performer is Graciana Silva, whose releases on Discos Corason made inroads in Europe. Southern Veracruz is home to a distinct style of Jarochos that is characteristically lacking a harp, is played exclusively by requinto or jarana guitars, and is exemplified by the popular modern band Mono Blanco.
- Chilena: Chilena is a musical genre from the Costa Chica region, an area along the Pacific Ocean between the Mexican states of Oaxaca and Guerrero, although its influence extends to other nearby regions. It originated from the Chilean cueca, hence its name, a dance that was carried by Chilean sailors in 1821 and then by Chilean immigrants between 1848 and 1855, during the height of the California gold rush.

== Popular music of folk roots ==
=== Grupera ===
Grupera (or onda grupera) is a genre of Mexican popular music. It is influenced by the styles of cumbia, norteño, and ranchera, and reached the height of its popularity in the 1980s, especially in rural areas.

The music has roots in the rock groups of the 1960s but today generally consists of five or fewer musicians using electric guitars, keyboards and drums. Artists in this genre include Los Yonics, Los Temerarios, Los Bukis, La Mafia, Ana Bárbara, Alicia Villarreal, Mariana Seoane, Grupo Bryndis, Los Freddy's, Lidia Ávila, Los Caminantes, Los Humildes, La Migra, Liberación, Pegasso, and Grupo Mojado. The music increased in popularity in the 1990s and became commercially viable, and is now recognized in some Latin music awards ceremonies such as Lo Nuestro and the Latin Grammy Awards.

The original wave of Mexican rock bands got their start mostly with Spanish covers of popular English rock songs. After this initial stage they moved on to include in their repertoire traditional ranchera songs, in addition to cumbia, and ballads. Thus the 1970s saw the rise of a number of grupera bands that specialized in slow ballads and songs that up to that point had only been sung with mariachi. Among these we can include Los Muecas, Los Freddys, Los Babys, etc.

== Popular music ==
=== Pop ===
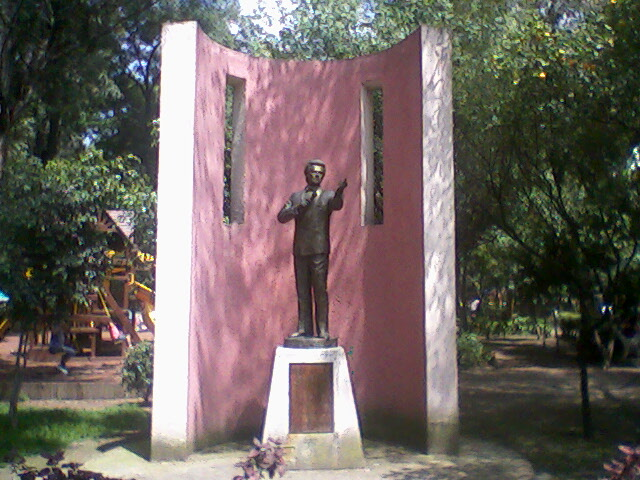
Statue of crooner José José El Príncipe de la Canción (The Prince of Song) in Mexico City.

During the 1960s and 1970s most of the pop music produced in Mexico consisted of Spanish-language versions of English-language rock-and-roll hits. Singers and musical groups like Angélica María, Johnny Laboriel, Alberto Vázquez, Enrique Guzmán or Los Teen Tops performed cover versions of songs by Elvis Presley, Paul Anka, Nancy Sinatra and others.

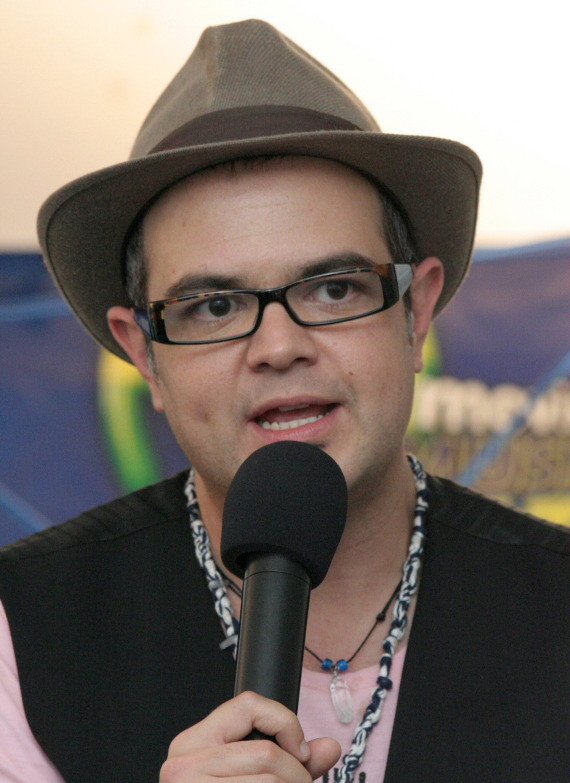
Aleks Syntek, winner of three Latin Billboard awards and an Ariel award for Best Film Music.

In 2000, the century saw the crossover of some of Mexican recording artist like Paulina Rubio and Thalía into the English music industry, with bilingual albums, compilation album, that included hit songs in English and Spanish language, and the firsts solo English-language albums by the Mexican pop artist. The best recording crossover artist has been Paulina Rubio with her first English-language album being Border Girl released on June 18, 2002. Thalia has collaborated with U.S. singer of traditional pop standards Tony Bennett in a duet for the song "The Way You Look Tonight". Viva Duets is the studio album by Tony Bennett, released in October 2012. It consists of electronically assembled duets between Bennett and younger singers from various genres like Frank Sinatras "Duets II". In Duets II, Sinatra personally invited Luis Miguel to participate on a duet in the album for the song "Come Fly with Me". Luis Miguel has been dubbed several times by the press and the media as the "Latin Frank Sinatra".

The best-known Mexican pop singers are José María Napoleón, Juan Gabriel, Lucía Méndez, Ana Gabriel, Daniela Romo, Marco Antonio Solís, Yuri, Gloria Trevi, Lucero, Angélica María, Luis Miguel, Sasha Sokol, Thalía, Paulina Rubio, Alessandra Rosaldo, Reyli, Bibi Gaytán, Edith Márquez, Fey, Aracely Arámbula, Irán Castillo, Lynda Thomas, Natalia Lafourcade, Paty Cantú, Anahí, Maite Perroni, Dulce María, Ximena Sariñana, Yuridia, Daniela Luján, Belinda Peregrín, Sofía Reyes, Kika Edgar, Carlos Rivera, Kalimba, and groups like Camila, Sin Bandera, Ha*Ash, Jesse & Joy, Belanova, Playa Limbo, and Jotdog.

=== Rock ===
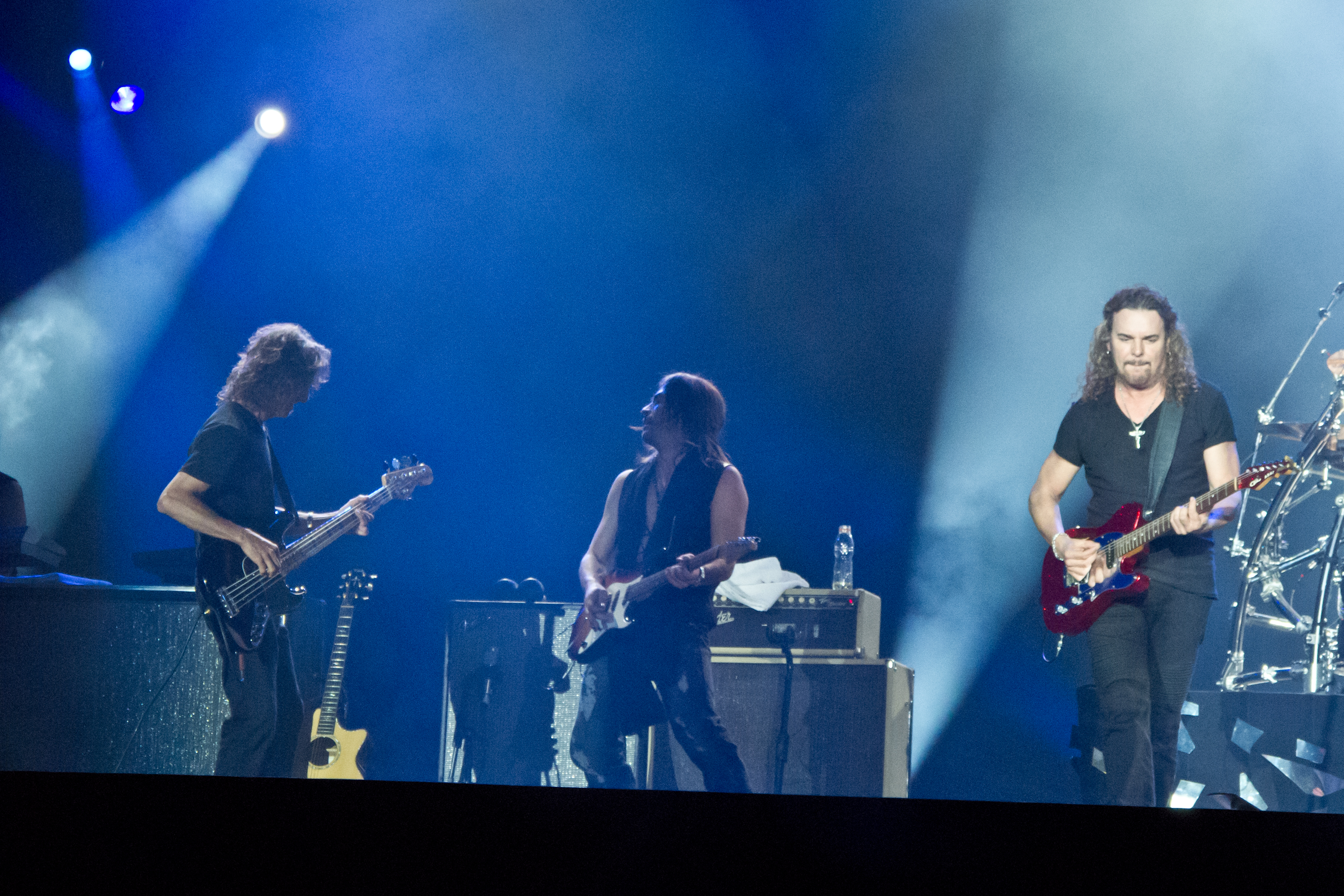
Maná

The Mexican rock movement started in the late 1950s and early 1960s, rapidly becoming popular, and peaking in the 1969 and 1990s with real authentic sounds and styles. One of the early Mexican rock bands came out of the predominantly Mexican barrio community of East Los Angeles, "Los Nómadas" (The Nomads). They were the first ethnically integrated rock and roll band of the 1950s, consisting of three Mestizo boys, Chico Vasquez, Jose 'J.D.' Moreno, Abel Padilla, and a Caucasian boy Bill Aken (Billy Mayorga Aken).

The adopted son of classical guitarist Francisco Mayorga and Mexican movie actress Lupe Mayorga, Aken was mentored by family friend, jazz guitarist Ray Pohlman and would later become rocker Zane Ashton, arranging music and playing lead guitar for everybody from Elvis to Nina Simone. His association with the other three boys would be a lifelong one and they stayed together as a band for more than thirty years. Mexican Rock combined the traditional instruments and stories of Mexico in its songs. Mexican and Latin American rock en español remain very popular in Mexico, surpassing other cultural interpretations of rock and roll, including British rock.

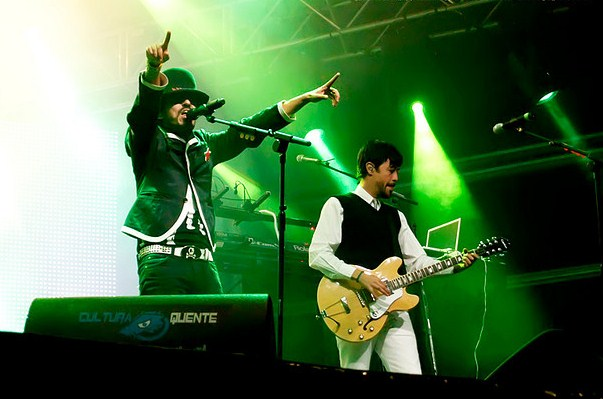
Café Tacuba performing in Pontevedra, Spain

In the 1960s and 1970s, during the PRI government, most rock bands were forced to appear underground, that was the time after Avándaro (a Woodstock-style Mexican festival) in which groups like El Tri, Enigma, Los Dug Dug's, Javier Bátiz and many others arose. During that time Mexican Carlos Santana became famous after performing at Woodstock. During the 1990s many Mexican bands surfaced and popular rock bands like Nar Mattaru,Santa Sabina, Café Tacuba, Caifanes, Control Machete, Fobia, Los de Abajo, Molotov, Maná, Ely Guerra, Julieta Venegas and Maldita Vecindad achieved a large international following.

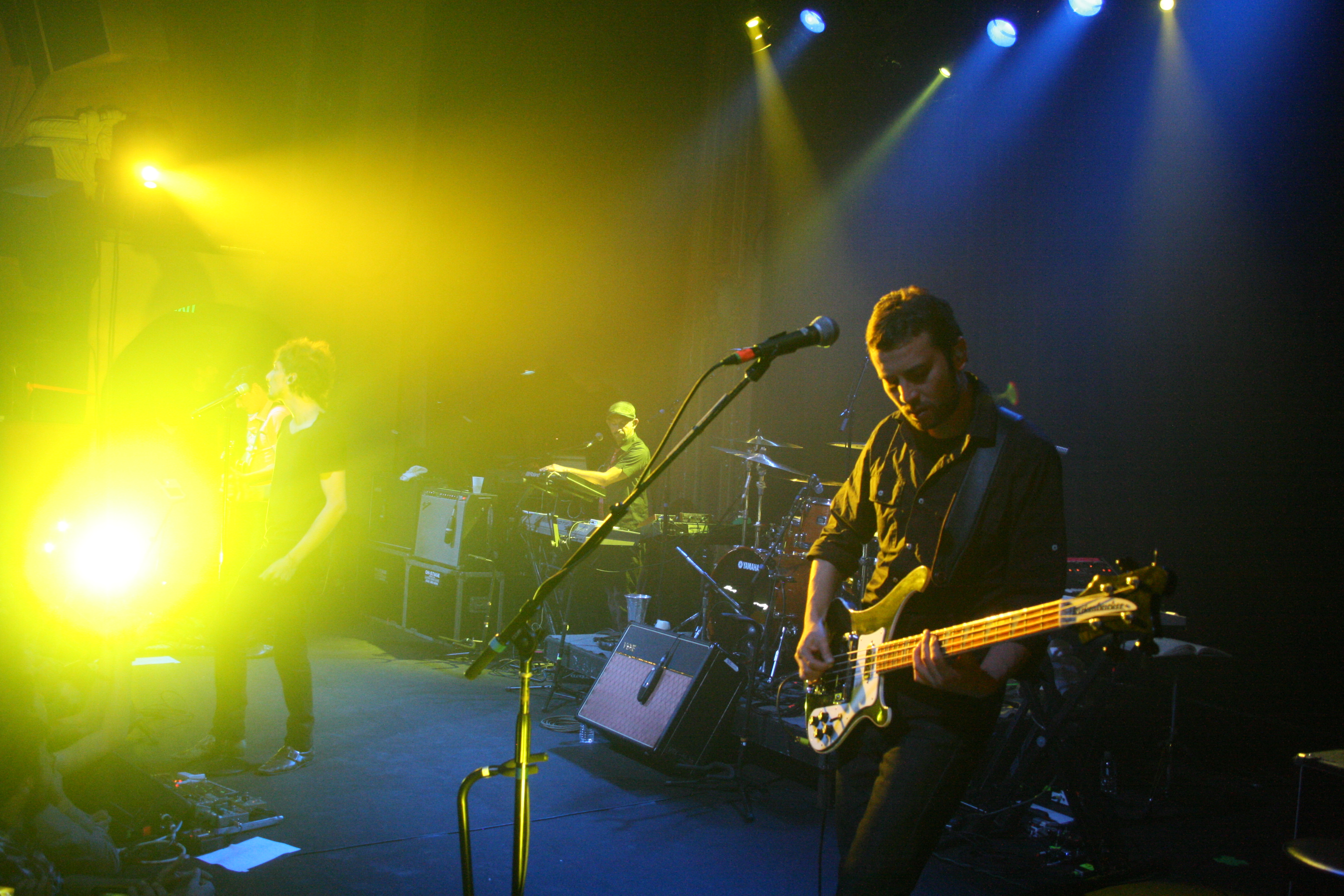
Zoé the band has achieved success in Mexico and most Spanish-speaking countries

The latter are "grandfathers" to the Latin ska movement. Mexico City has also a considerable movement of bands playing surf rock inspired in their outfits by local show-sport lucha libre. In the late 1990s, Mexico had a new wave "resurgence" of rock music with bands like Jumbo, Zoé, Porter, etc., as well as instrumentalists Rodrigo y Gabriela and Los Jaigüey the band of Santa Sabina's bass player, Poncho Figueroa, along with brothers Gustavo Jacob and Ricardo Jacob in the late 2000s.

Extreme metal has been popular for a long time in Mexico, with bands such as Dilemma, Exanime formed in 1985 in Monterrey, N.L. The Chasm, Xiuhtecuhtli, Disgorge, Brujeria, Transmetal, Hacavitz, Sargatanas, Mictlayotl, Yaoyotl, Ereshkigal, Xibalba, and Calvarium Funestus. The Mexican metal fanbase is credited with being amongst the most lively and intense, and favorites for European metal bands to perform for.

Alejandra Guzmán's 26 years of artistic career, with more than 10 million albums sold, 16 released albums and 30 singles in radio's top 10 hits, has earned her the title of La Reina del Rock (The Queen of Rock). She is the daughter of two Latin entertainment legends: movie icon Silvia Pinal and rock and roll legend Enrique Guzmán, from whom she inherits her talent and passion for arts, music, dance and constant spiritual growth, but in the real Mexican vision her as seen like a pop singer, not real rock.

=== Latin alternative ===
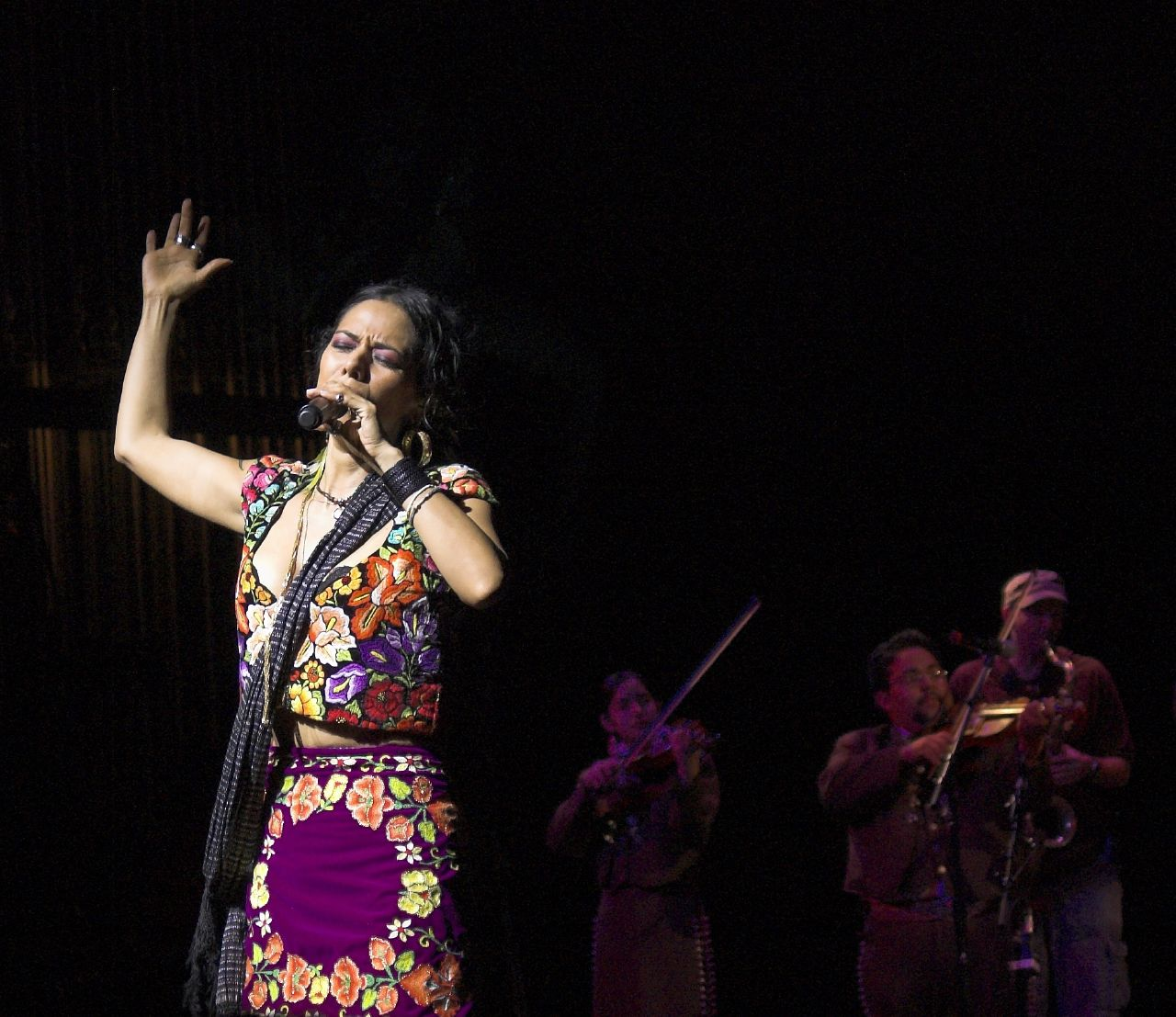
Lila Downs in the "National Sor Juana Festival" 2007.

Latin alternative takes influence from a wide variety of genres, including rock, hip-hop and electronica. It represents a sonic shift away from regionalism and points to a new global Latin identity.

The name "Latin alternative" was coined in the late 1990s by American record company executives as a way to sell music that was -literally—all over the map. It was marketed as an alternative to the slick, highly produced Latin pop that dominated commercial Spanish-language radio, such as Ricky Martin or Paulina Rubio.

Artists within the genre, such as Rodrigo y Gabriela, Carla Morrison, Café Tacuba, Hello Seahorse!, Porter, Juan Son, Austin TV, Lila Downs, Maria José, Paté de Fuá, Julieta Venegas and Jenny and the Mexicats have set out to defy traditional expectations of Latin music.

=== Mexican ska ===
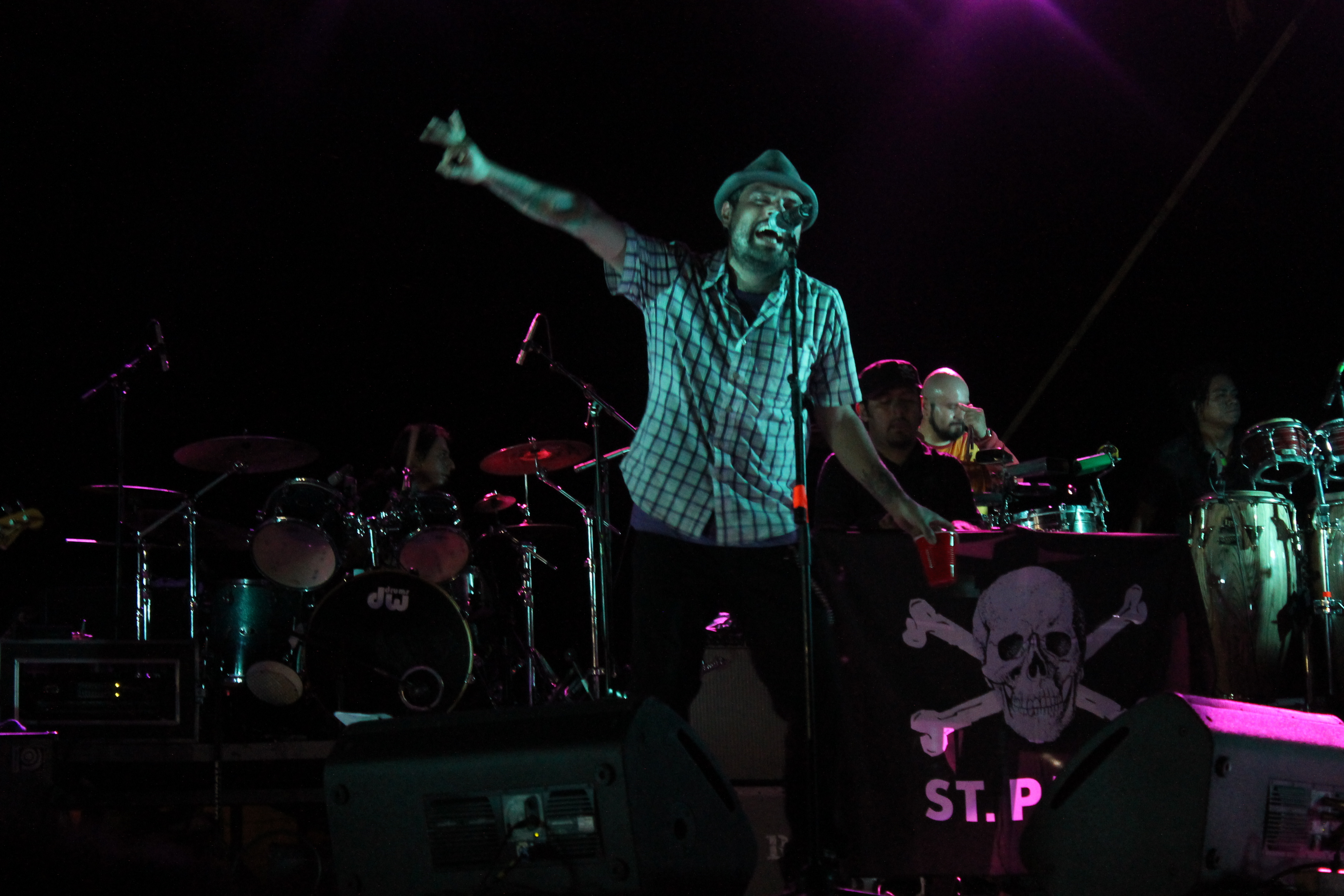
Panteon Rococo

Ska entered Mexico in the 1960s, when both small bands like Los Matemáticos and big orchestras like Orquestra de Pablo Beltrán Ruíz recorded both original ska tunes and covers of Jamaiacan hits. After early new wave bands of the early 1980s like Ritmo Peligroso and Kenny y los Eléctricos incorporated ska into their post-punk sound, a more punk-influenced brand of Ska started being produced in Mexico City in the late eighties, and the genre enjoyed its highest popularity during the early 2000s, even though it is still very popular today. Mexican Ska groups include Panteón Rococó (Mexico City), Inspector (Nuevo Leon), Control Machete, La Maldita Vecindad (Mexico City), Mama Pulpa (Mexico City) and Tijuana No! (Tijuana, Baja California; originally named Radio Chantaje).

=== Electronic ===
Some of the best Mexican composers for electronic and electroacoustic media are Javier Torres Maldonado, Murcof and Manuel Rocha Iturbide, the later conducting festivals and workshops of experimental music and art, in Mexico City and Paris. Some exponents are 3Ball MTY, Nortec Collective, Wakal, Kobol, Murcof, Hocico & Deorro and Mexican Institute of Sound.

== Other music of Latin-American roots ==
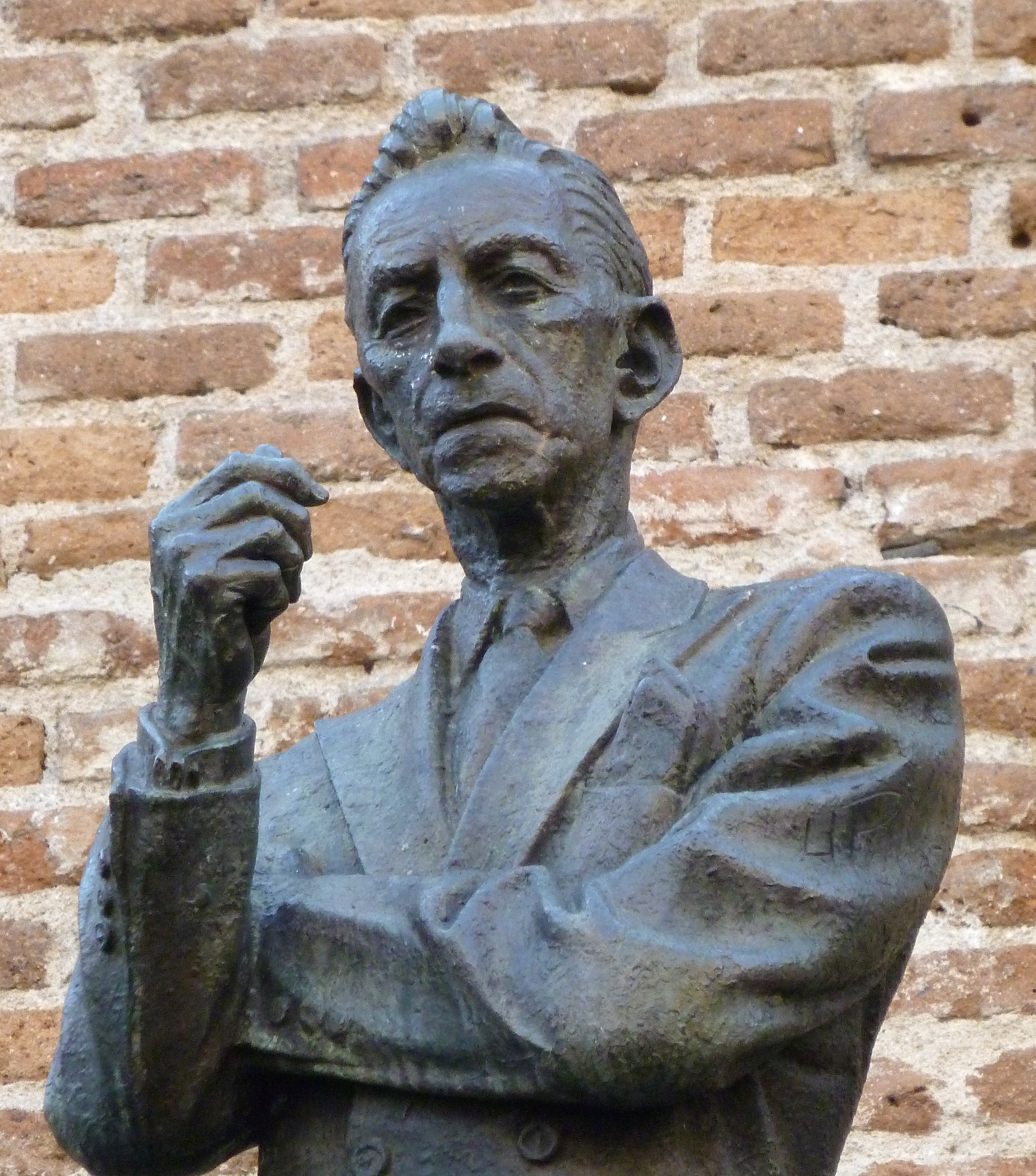
Agustín Lara

Other popular forms of music found in various parts of Mexico – mostly with origins in other parts of the Caribbean and Latin America include rumba, mambo, Cha cha chá, Danzón, Cumbia, and bolero. Rumba came from the black Mexican slaves in Veracruz, Mexico City, and Yucatán. The style began in Cuba and later became famous in the black community of Mexico. From the beginning of the 20th century, bolero arrived to Yucatán, and Danzón to Veracruz. Both styles became very popular all over the country, and a Mexican style of both rhythms was developed.

In the 1940s, the Cubans Pérez Prado, Benny Moré emigrated to Mexico, they brought with them the mambo, which became extremely popular especially in Mexico City, later on mambo developed into Cha cha chá, which was also popular.

=== Bolero ===
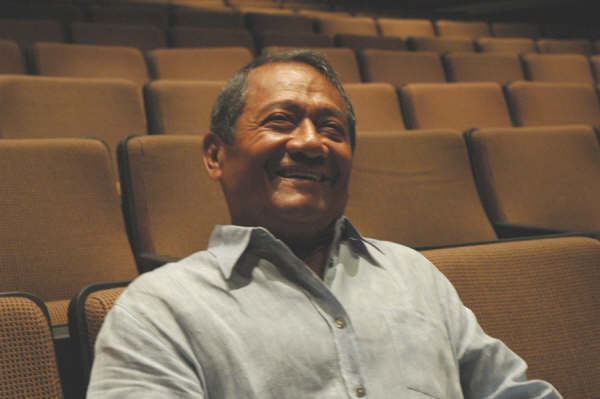
Armando Manzanero widely considered the premier Mexican romantic composer of the postwar era.

The Cuban bolero has traveled to Mexico and the rest of Latin America after its conception, where it became part of their repertoires. Some of the bolero's leading composers have come from nearby countries, most especially the prolific Puerto Rican composer Rafael Hernández; another example is Mexico's Agustín Lara. Some Cuban composers of the bolero are listed under Trova. Some successful Mexican bolero composers are María Grever, Gonzalo Curiel Barba, Gabriel Ruiz, and Consuelo Velázquez which song Verdad Amarga (Bitter Truth) was the most popular in Mexico in the year 1948.

Another composer Armando Manzanero widely considered the first Mexican romantic composer of the Post-war era and one of the most successful composers of Latin America has composed more than four hundred songs, fifty of which have given him international fame. His most well-known songs include Voy a apagar la luz (I'm Going to Turn Off the Lights), Contigo Aprendí (With you I Learnt... ), Adoro (Adore), No sé tú (I don't know if you...), Por Debajo de la Mesa (Under the Table) Esta Tarde Vi Llover (English version "Yesterday I Heard the Rain"), Somos Novios (English version "It's Impossible"), Felicidad (Happiness) and Nada Personal (Nothing Personal).

Some renowned trios románticos were Trio Los Panchos, Los Tres Ases, Los Tres Diamantes and Los Dandys. Trio Bolero, a unique ensemble of two guitars and one cello. Other singers in singing boleros in Mexico are Óscar Chávez, José Ángel Espinoza and Álvaro Carrillo.

Included among the acclaimed interpreters of the bolero on the radio and the international concert stage were the Mexican tenors Juan Arvizu and Nestor Mesta Chayres. The brother of Aida Cuevas, "the Queen of the Ranchera," Carlos Cuevas has been equally successful as an interpreter of the bolero and Eugenia León in Mexico's contemporary music scene.

=== Romantic ballad or Latin ballad ===
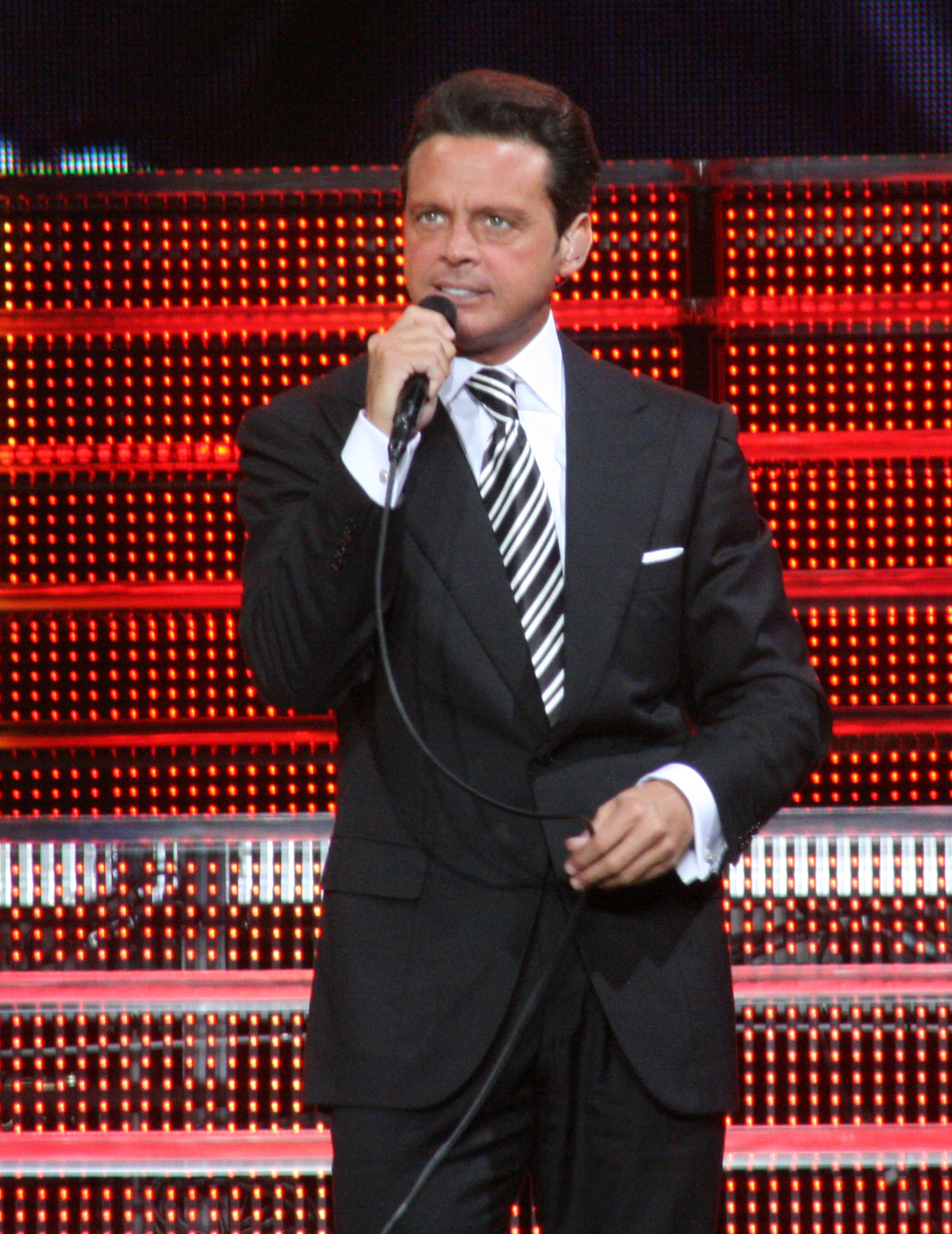
Luis Miguel, "El sol de Mexico" (The Sun of Mexico). His album 33, which featured a collection of ballads and uptempo songs climbed to number 1 on Billboard's Latin Charts earning Luis Miguel two Billboard Awards as well as Grammy and Latin Grammy award nominations.

The Latin or romantic balled has its origin in the Latin American bolero in the 1950s (Lucho Kitten, Leo Marini), but also in the romantic song in Italian (Nicola Di Bari) and French (Charles Aznavour) in the 1960s and 1970s.

The ethnomusicologist Daniel Party defines the romantic ballad as "a love song of slow tempo, played by a solo singer accompanied by an orchestra usually".

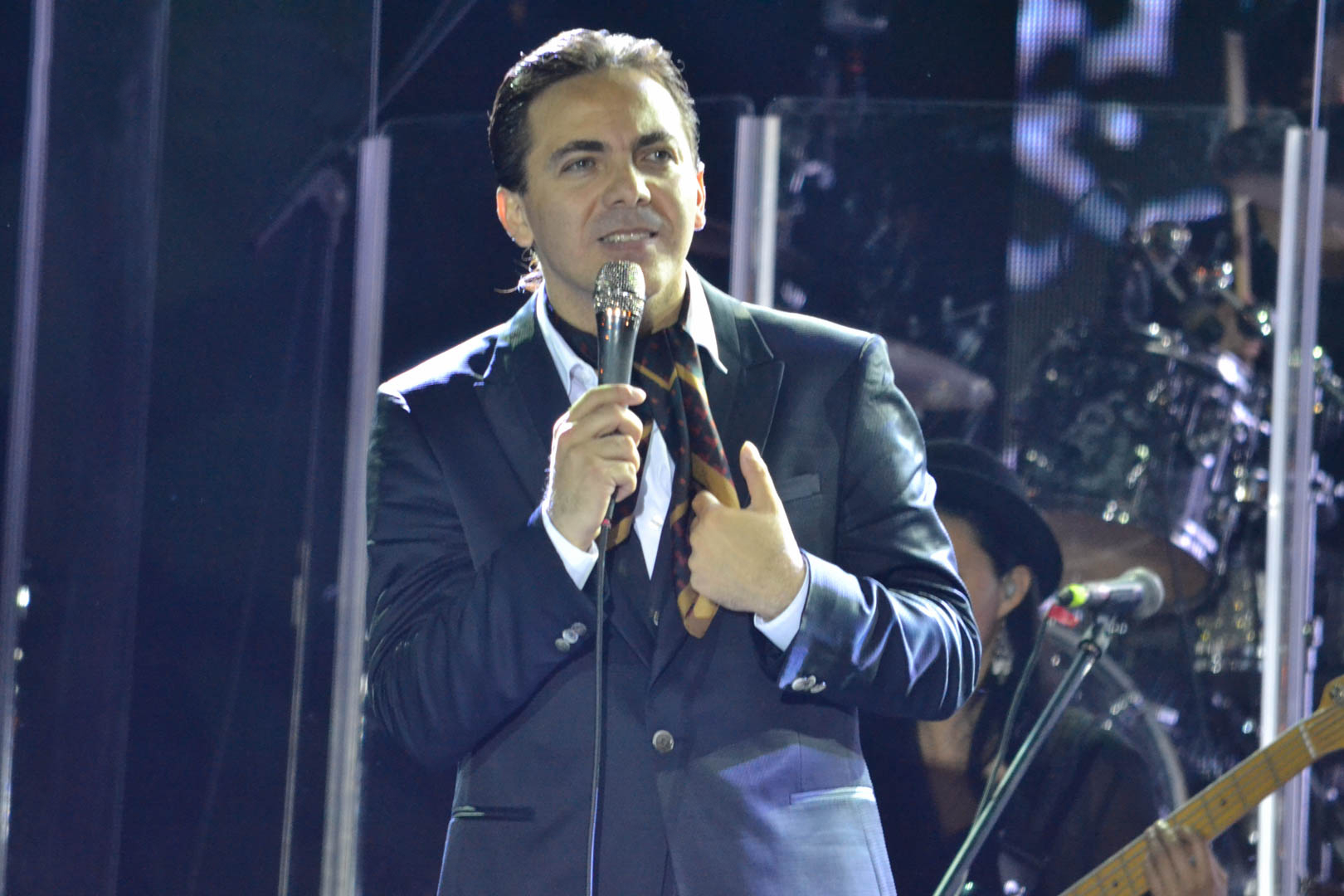
On September 28, 2010, Cristian Castro released the single "La Nave del Olvido" and "Amor, Amor" as part of Viva el Príncipe, his tribute album to José José.

The ballad and bolero are often confused and songs can fall in one or the other category without too much precision. The distinction between them is referring primarily to a more sophisticated and more metaphorical language and subtle bolero, compared with a more direct expression of the ballad.

In Mexico, the first ballad that is registered as such is "Sonata de Amor" (Sonata of Love) of Mario Alvarez in 1961. In 1965, bolero singer-songwriter Armando Manzanero recorded his first ballad, "Pobres besos míos" (My Poor Kisses).

The heyday of the ballad was reached in the mid-1970s, where artists such as José José, Camilo Sesto, Raphael, Roberto Carlos, Rocío Dúrcal and others released many hits. The main hist of José José were "El triste" (The Sad One) by Roberto Cantoral, "La nave del olvido" (The ship of the forgotten), "Te extraño" (I Miss You), "Amar y querer" (Love and want), or "Gavilán o Paloma" (Hawk or Dove), "Lo Pasado Pasado" (The Past is Past), "Volcán" (Volcano) or "Lo que no fue no será" (What Never Was Will Never Be). In the course of their existence the genre merged with diverse rhythms to form several variants, such as romantic salsa and cumbia aside others. Manolo Muñoz was one of the first soloists in Latin America to sing romantic ballads, Víctor Yturbe considered one of the best interpreters of this genre in Mexico and Lupita D'Alessio is one of the great female singers in the ballad genre of the '80s in Latin America.

From the 1990s on, globalization and media internationalization contributed to the ballad's international spread and homogenization.

== Tropical ==
Sonora Santanera is an orchestra playing tropical music from Mexico with over 60 years of history. Los Hermanos Rigual were a Cuban vocal group based in Mexico, mainly active in the sixties. They had their breakout in 1962, thanks to the song "Cuando calienta el sol" which became an international hit.

=== Cumbia ===
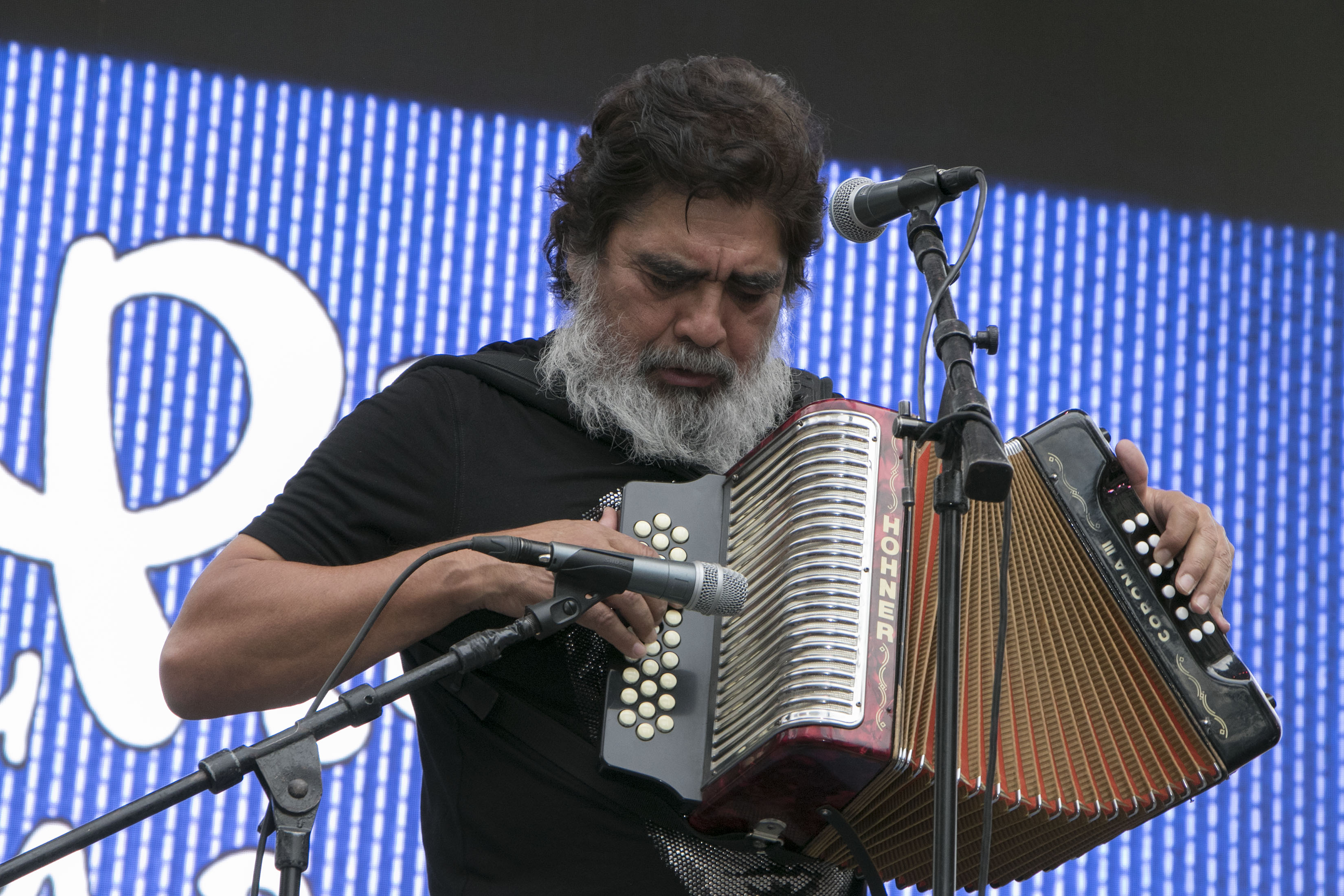
Piña was a pioneer in the mixture and fusion of tropical sounds.

The history of Cumbia in Mexico is almost as old as Cumbia in Colombia. In the 1940s Colombian singers emigrated to Mexico, where they worked with the Mexican orquestra director Rafael de Paz. In the 1950s they recorded what many people consider to be the first cumbia recorded outside of Colombia, La Cumbia Cienaguera. He recorded other hits like Mi gallo tuerto, Caprichito, and Nochebuena. This is when Cumbia began to become popular Mexico, with Tony Camargo as one of the first exponents of Mexican Cumbia. In Mexico D.F., most people who dance to it are called "Chilangos"—which means people born in the main district.

In the 1970s Aniceto Molina emigrated to Mexico, where he joined the group from Guerrero, La Luz Roja de San Marcos, and recorded many popular tropical cumbias like El Gallo Mojado, El Peluquero, and La Mariscada. Also in the 1970s, Rigo Tovar became popular with his fusion of Cumbia with ballad and rock.

Today Cumbia is played in many different ways, and has slight variations depending on the geographical area like Cumbia sonidera, Cumbia andina mexicana, Cumbia Norteña, Tecno-cumbia. Popular Mexican Cumbia composers and interpreters include Rigo Tovar y su Costa Azul, Celso Piña, Pilar Montenegro, Ninel Conde, Los Caminantes, and Selena.

Los Ángeles Azules play the cumbia sonidera genre, which is a cumbia subgenre using the accordion and synthesizers. This results in a fusion of the sounds of cumbia from the 1950-1970s with those of 1990s-style electronic music.

== Art music ==
=== Operas ===
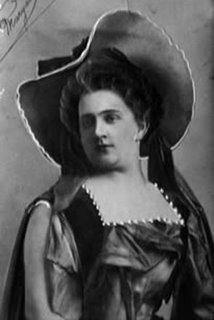
Ángela Peralta, operatic soprano

The first opera by a Mexican-born composer was Manuel de Zumaya's La Parténope, performed in 1711 before a private audience in the Viceroy's Palace in Mexico City. However, the first Mexican composer to have his operas publicly staged was Manuel Arenzana, the maestro de capilla at Puebla Cathedral from 1792 to 1821. He is known to have written at least two works performed during the 1805-06 season at the Teatro Coliseo in Mexico City — El extrangero and Los dos ribales en amore. Both were short comic pieces. The first Mexican opera seria was Paniagua's Catalina de Guisa (composed in 1845 and premiered in 1859). With its story about the Huguenots in France and an Italian libretto by Felice Romani, contemporary critics noted that the only thing Mexican about it was the composer.

Although the traditions of European opera and especially Italian opera had initially dominated the Mexican music conservatory and strongly influenced native opera composers (in both style and subject matter), elements of Mexican nationalism had already appeared by the latter part of the 19th century with operas such as Aniceto Ortega del Villar's 1871 Guatimotzin, a romanticised account of the defense of Mexico by its last Aztec ruler, Cuauhtémoc. Later works such as Miguel Bernal Jiménez's 1941 Tata Vasco (based on the life of Vasco de Quiroga, the first bishop of Michoacán) incorporated native melodies into the score. Ángela Peralta was an operatic soprano of international fame, known in Europe as "The Mexican Nightingale", who sang in the premieres of operas by Paniagua, Morales, and Ortega del Villar. Mexican tenors include Rolando Villazon, Ramón Vargas, Francisco Araiza, Arturo Chacón Cruz, Fernando de la Mora, Javier Camarena, José Mojica, José Sosa Esquivel, and Alfonso Ortiz Tirado. Mexican soprano include Marta Domingo, Maria Katzarava, Irma González, Olivia Gorra, Irasema Terrazas, and singer Susana Zabaleta.

Spanish opera singer, conductor and arts administrator Plácido Domingo (in the 1990s part of The Three Tenors), started his career in Mexico and continued to do charitable work and presentations in Mexico.

=== Classical ===
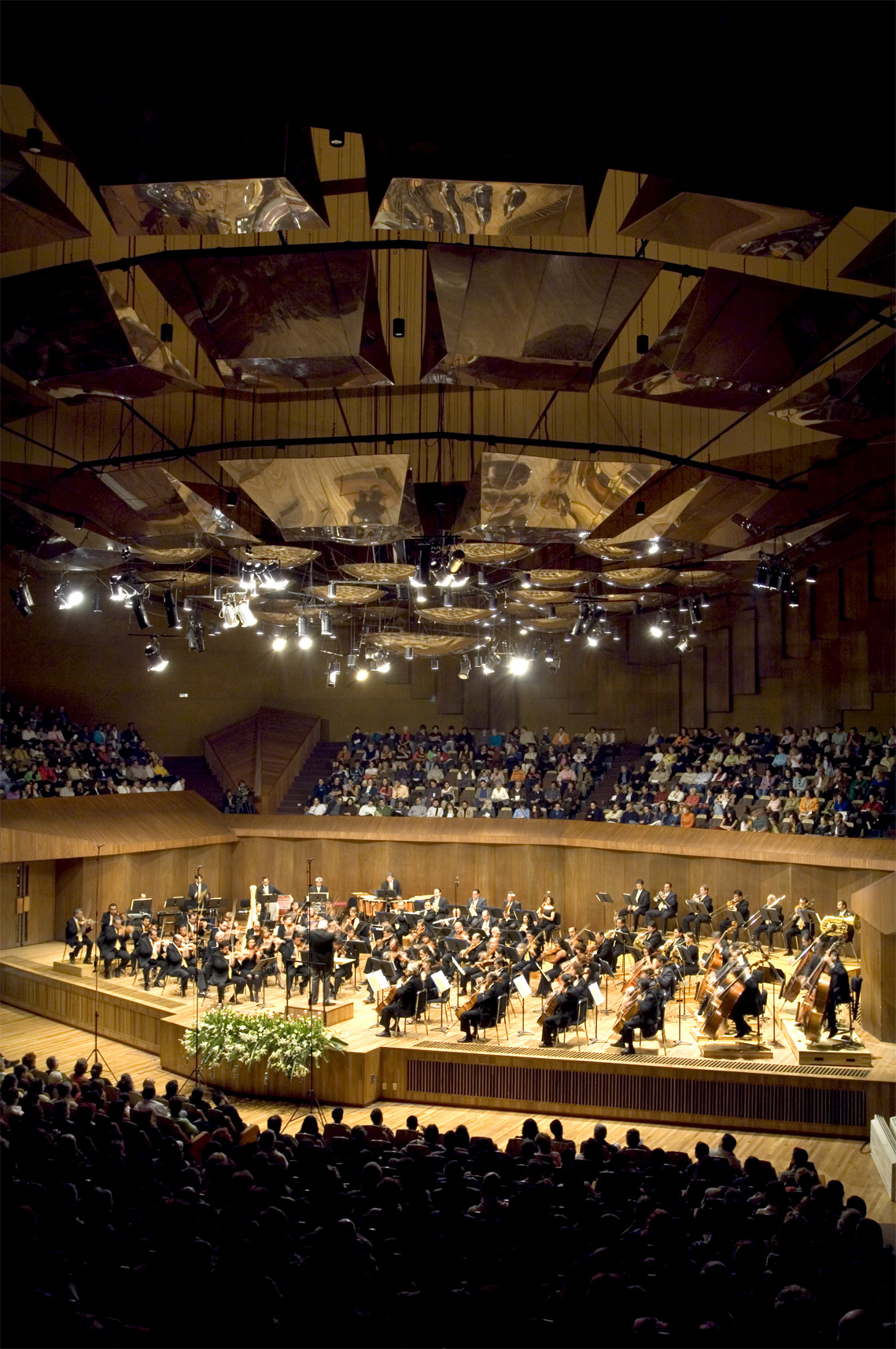
OFUNAM playing at Sala Nezahualcóyotl (Room Nezahualcoyotl).

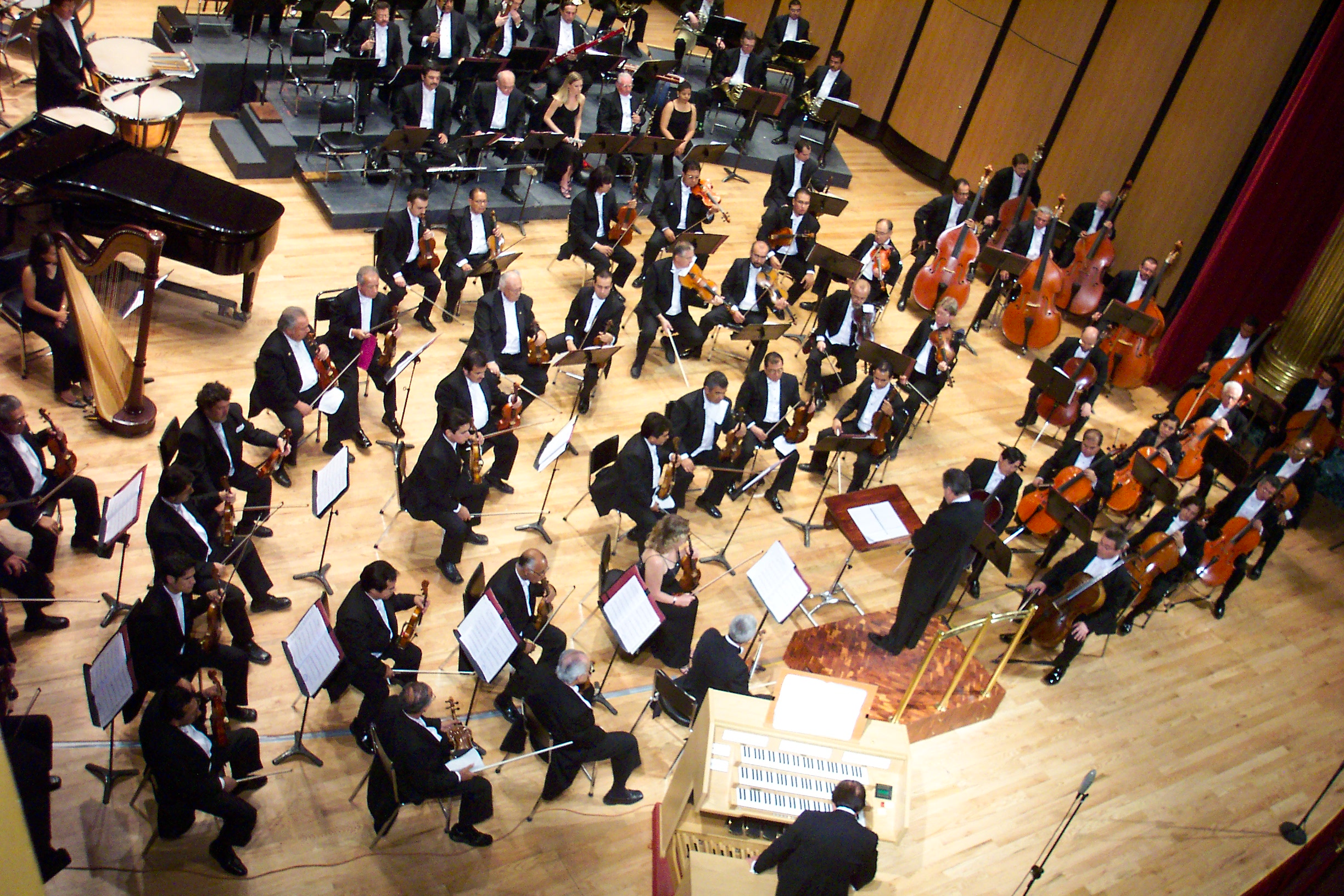
The Jalisco Symphony Orchestra.

Puebla was a significant center of music composition in the 17th century, as the city had considerable wealth and for a time was presided over by Bishop Juan de Palafox y Mendoza, who was an enthusiastic patron of music. Composers during this period included Bernardo de Peralta Escudero (mostly active around 1640), and also Juan Gutiérrez de Padilla, who was the most well-known composer of the 17th century in Mexico. The construction of the cathedral in Puebla made the composition and performance of polychoral music possible, especially compositions in the Venetian polychoral style. Late in the century, Miguel Matheo de Dallo y Lana set the verse of poet Sor Juana Inés de la Cruz.

In the 18th century, Manuel de Sumaya, maestro de capilla at the cathedral in Mexico City, wrote many cantadas and villancicos, and he was the first Mexican to compose an opera, La Partenope (1711). After him, Ignacio Jerusalem, an Italian-born composer, brought some of the latest operatic styles as well as early classical (galant) styles to Mexico. His best-known composition is probably the Matins for the Virgin of Guadalupe (1764). Jerusalem was maestro de capilla at the cathedral in Mexico City after Sumaya, from 1749 until his death in 1769.

In the 19th century the waltzes of Juventino Rosas achieved world recognition. Manuel M. Ponce is recognized as an important composer for the Spanish classical guitar, responsible for widening the repertoire for this instrument. Ponce also wrote a rich repertoire for solo piano, piano and ensembles, and piano and orchestra, developing the first period of modernistic nationalism, using Native American and European resources, but merging them into a new, original style.

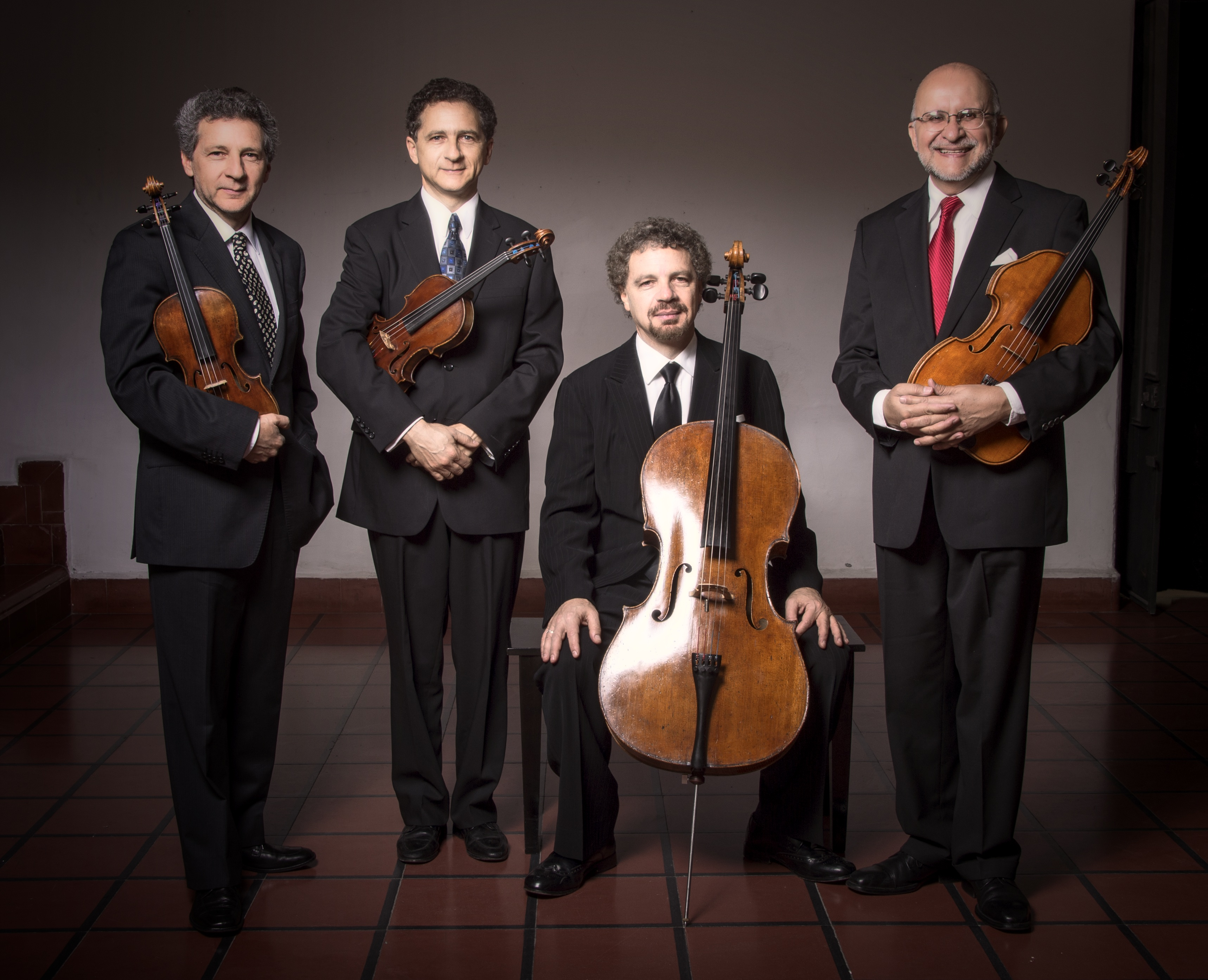
Cuarteto Latinoamericano is a renowned string quartet, formed in Mexico in 1981.

In the 20th century, Carlos Chávez is a notable composer who wrote symphonies, ballets, and a wide catalog of chamber music, within varied esthetic orientations. Chávez's "Sinfonía India" ("Indian Symphony") uses three themes based on indigenous songs from northern Mexico. Another recognized composer is Silvestre Revueltas who wrote such pieces as The Night of the Mayas, an homage to García Lorca (tribute to García Lorca), Sensemayá based on a poem by Nicolás Guillén, and orchestral suites like Janitzio and Redes originally written for motion pictures. José Pablo Moncayo with compositions such as Huapango, and Blas Galindo with Sones de Mariachi, are also recognized as adapters of Mexican sons into symphonic music. A later contributor to this tradition, Arturo Márquez is also internationally known by his orchestral mastery and melodic vivacity like Danzón No. 2.

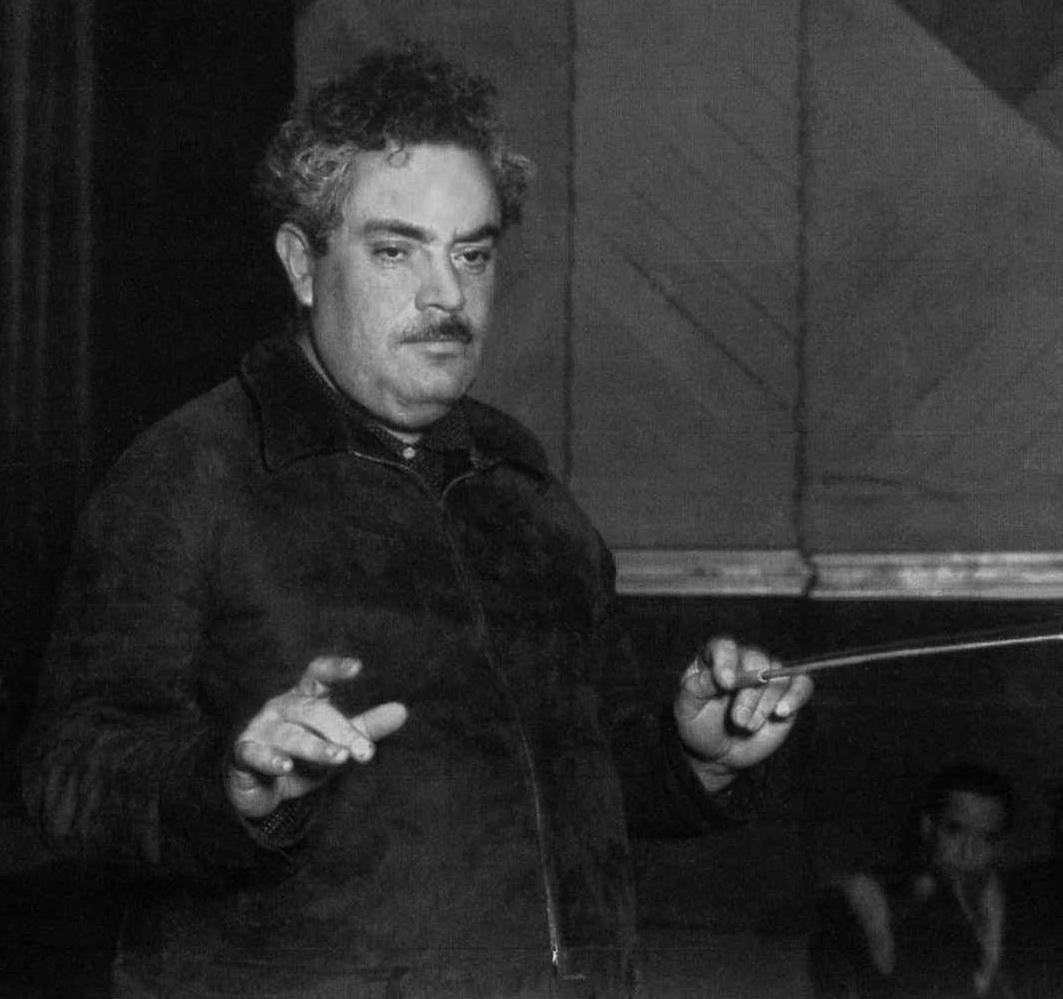
Silvestre Revueltas

In 1922, Julián Carrillo (violinist, composer, conductor, theoretician and inventor), created a microtonal system that he called "Sonido 13". He also developed and constructed harps and pianos able to play music in fragments of tone, like fourths, sixths, eighths and sixteenths. Another contemporary Mexican composer was Conlon Nancarrow (of U.S. birth), who created a system to play pianola music, using and developing theories of politempo and polimetrics. Composers leading Mexican music during the second half of the 20th century include Alicia Urreta, Manuel Enríquez, Mario Lavista, and Julio Estrada. Composers of the next generation include Gabriela Ortiz, Graciela Agudelo, Daniel Catán, Carlos Sanchez-Gutierrez, Guillermo Galindo, Ignacio Baca-Lobera, Hebert Vázquez, Ricardo Zohn-Muldoon, Javier Álvarez, Ana Lara, Víctor Rasgado, Juan Trigos, Hilda Paredes, and Javier Torres Maldonado. Stablished composers of a new generation born in the 70's include Georgina Derbez, Gabriel Pareyón, Enrico Chapela, Víctor Ibarra, Arturo Fuentes, and José Luis Hurtado.

=== Jazz ===
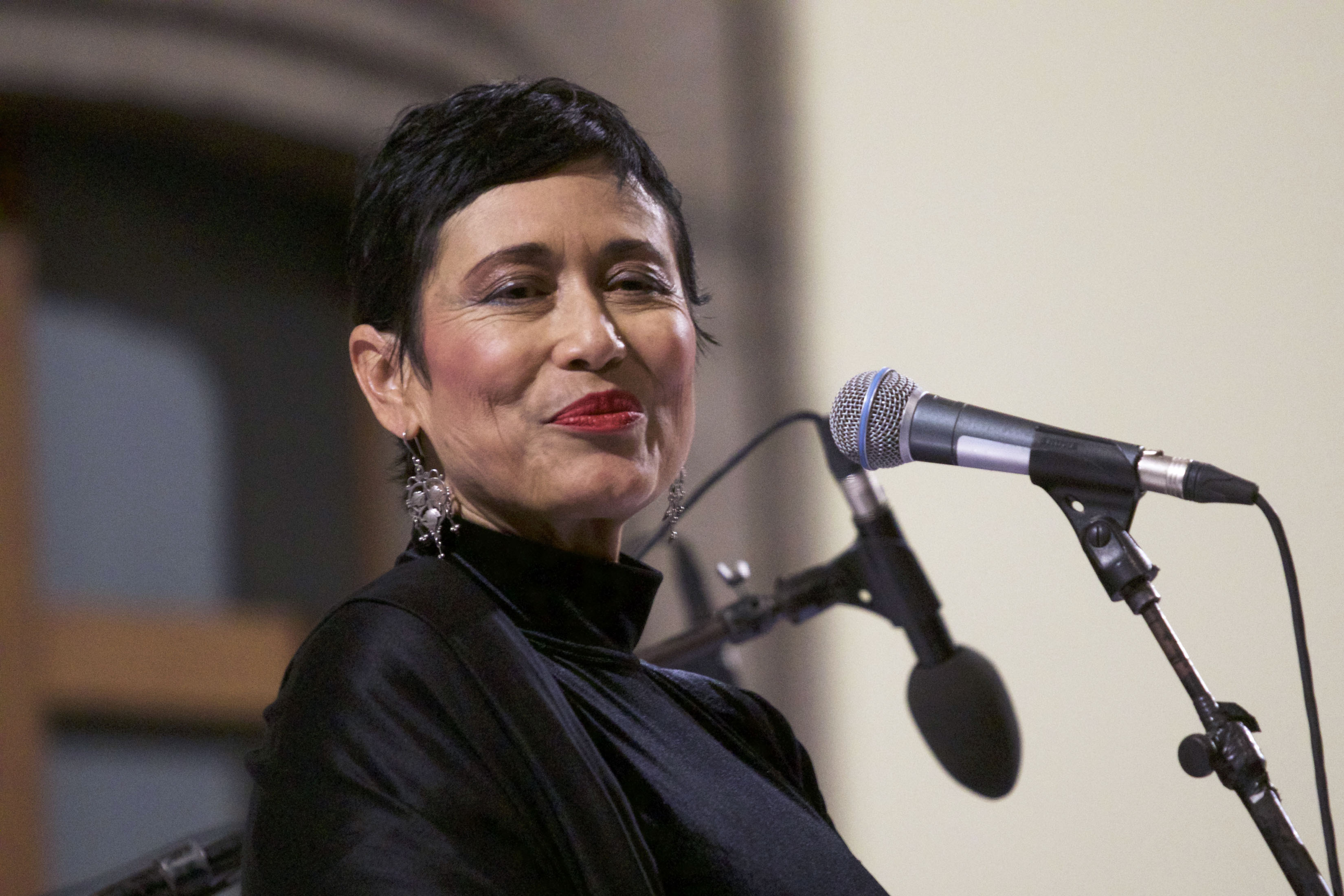
Jaramar sings in the Genre of World Music

Some notable Mexican jazz musicians include Magos Herrera, Tino Contreras, and Agustín Bernal. Other prominent figures in the Mexican jazz scene include Juan García Esquivel, Eugenio Toussaint, Arturo Castro, Rafael Méndez, Richard Lemus, Leo Acosta, Luis Ocadiz, J. J. Calatayud, Chilo Morán, and Popo Sánchez. Antonio Sánchez, a highly regarded jazz drummer and composer from Mexico City, has been performing with renowned U.S. musicians since he moved to the United States in the early 1990s. He has collaborated with artists such as Pat Metheny, Chick Corea, Michael Brecker, and Gary Burton, in addition to leading his own bands and ensembles.

Arturo O'Farrill, the son of Latin jazz musician, arranger, and bandleader Chico O'Farrill, is known for his contributions to contemporary Latin jazz. His music is often described as "pan-Latin" in style by critic Dan Bilawsky. The Teatro Metropólitan sponsors Mexico City's National Jazz Festival. Another group exploring Latin jazz is the Villalobos Brothers.

== Table (traditional music ensembles) ==
Traditional ensembles and instruments
Ensemble	Bowed Strings	Plucked Strings	Wood Winds	Brass Winds	Other Aerophones	Membranophone Percussion	Idiophone Percussion
Mariachi	violin	guitar, vihuela, guitarron		trumpet			
Banda			clarinet, saxophone	tuba, trombone, trumpet		tambora, tarola	cymbals
Conjunto norteño		bajo sexto, double bass	saxophone		accordion	drums, tarola	redoba
Conjunto jarocho		requinto jarocho, jarana jarocha, leona, harp				pandero octagonal	marimbol, quijada, güiro
Conjunto huasteco	violin	huapanguera, jarana huasteca					
Marimba orquesta		double bass	saxophone			drums	marimba, güiro
Conjunto calentano	violin	guitarra sexta, guitarra panzona, double bass				tamborita	
Conjunto de arpa grande	violin	harp, guitar, vihuela, double bass					
Jarana yucateca		double bass	clarinet, saxophone	trumpet, trombone		timpani	cymbals, güiro
Conjunto de son de tarima		vihuela, guitar					cajón de tapeo
Conjunto mixteco	violin	guitar, bajo quinto					cántaro
Trío romántico		guitar, guitarra requinto					maracas
Tamborileros de Tabasco			flauta de tres hoyos			tamboril, tamboril requinto	
Orquesta típica	violin	bandolón, guitar, salterio	clarinet			snare drum	
Flauta y Tamboril			flauta de tres hoyos			tambor de marco, tamborcito	
Chirimía			chirimía			tambor	
Conjunto de Costa Chica					harmonica	friction drum	quijada
Tamborileros del norte			clarinet			tambora	
Violín y tambora	violin					tambora	
Prehispánico			ocarina, caracol, flauta de tres hoyos			huehuetl, tambor de u, kayum	teponaztli, ayoyotes, sonaja

== See also ==
- Regional styles of Mexican music
- Regional Mexican
- List of music artists and bands from Mexico
- Mexican hip hop
- Category:Mexican composers
- List of Mexican operas
- National Conservatory of Music
- Danzon de Mexico
- Billboard Top Latin Albums
- Regional Mexican Airplay
- Hot Latin Songs
- Flamenco
