= Lorena Vera =

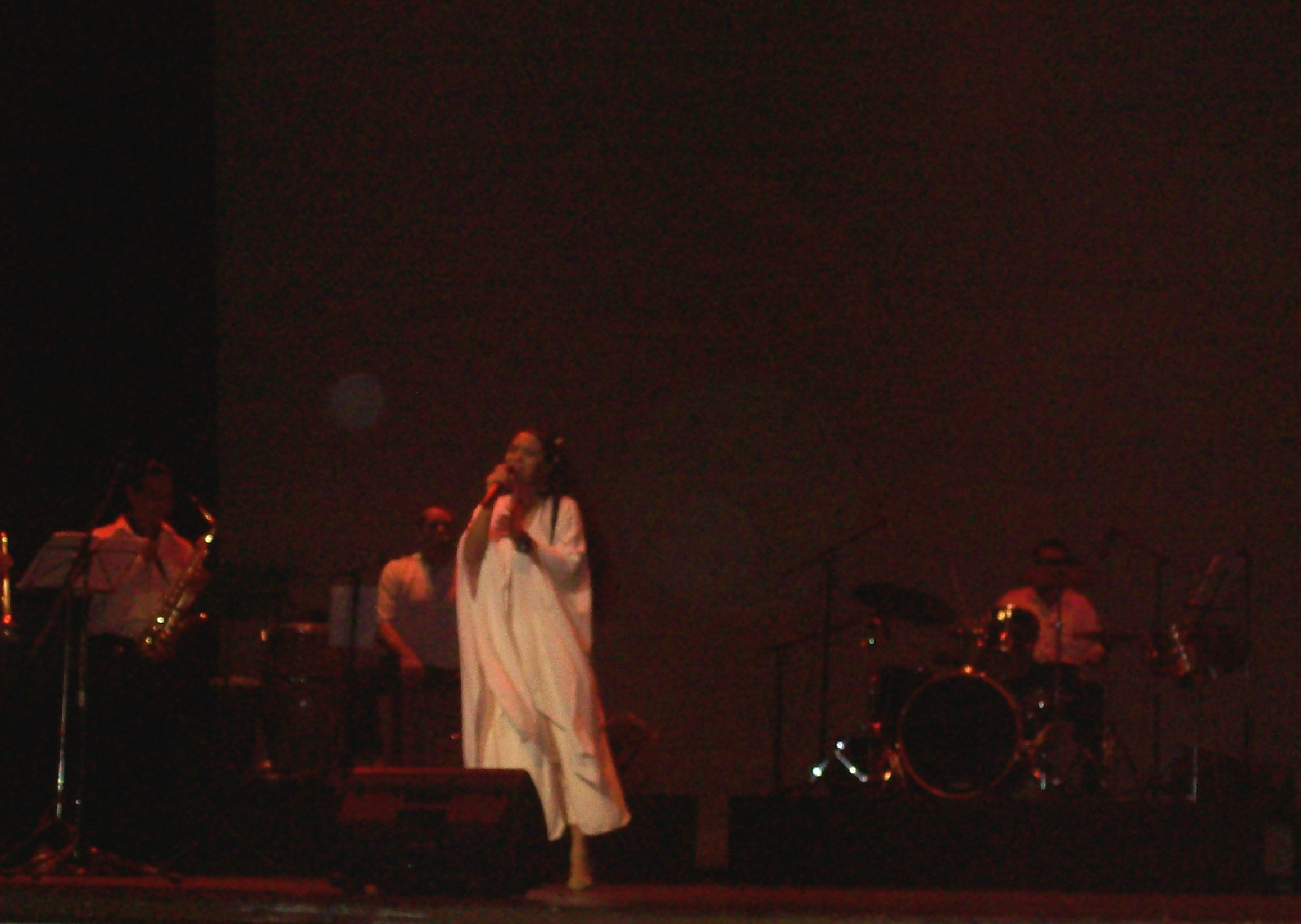

Background information
- Also known as: Lorena
- Born: Lorena Vera
- Origin: Oaxaca, Mexico
- Genres: World Music, Jazz, Chilena
- Occupations: Singer, songwriter, entrepreneur
- Instrument: Voice
- Years active: 1998– Present
- Label: Indie

Lorena Vera is a Mexican composer, producer, dancer, actress, and singer of traditional music born in Oaxaca de Juarez, Mexico. She is currently a vocalist in the Mexican world music band Lorena y Los Alebrijes, which mixes sounds as jazz, blues, cumbia and Chilena.

== Biography ==
Lorena Vera was born in Oaxaca City. She began to sing from adolescence, beginning her musical studies at the Center of Artistic Education of Oaxaca. When culminating their basic studies in the CEDART, Vera entered the Institute of Sciences and Arts of Oaxaca where she took classes in singing and performance, later on she took classes in contemporary dance at the House of the Oaxacan Culture. In 1999, with Ignacio Carrillo, she began an intense one investigation and experimentation with the sounds of different cultures, focused in the African-American-Mexican area of the Costa Region. It is there where Lorena y Los Alebrijes began, a musical project focused in interpreting pieces of the cultural repertoire of the State of Oaxaca. Vera writes part of the songs which are fleshed out with the percussionist Ignacio Lico Carrillo, the pianist Jorge Villanueva and the guitarist Jesus Medina. Vera has also participated in musicals such as "They Are of the Skull" and "Woman of Corn". She has also produced the materials of Los Alebrijes with whom she has promoted through the culture of excluded indigenous communities

Vera has been a scholarship holder of FOESCA.
