= Fanny Anitúa =

Mexican contralto opera singer (1887–1968)

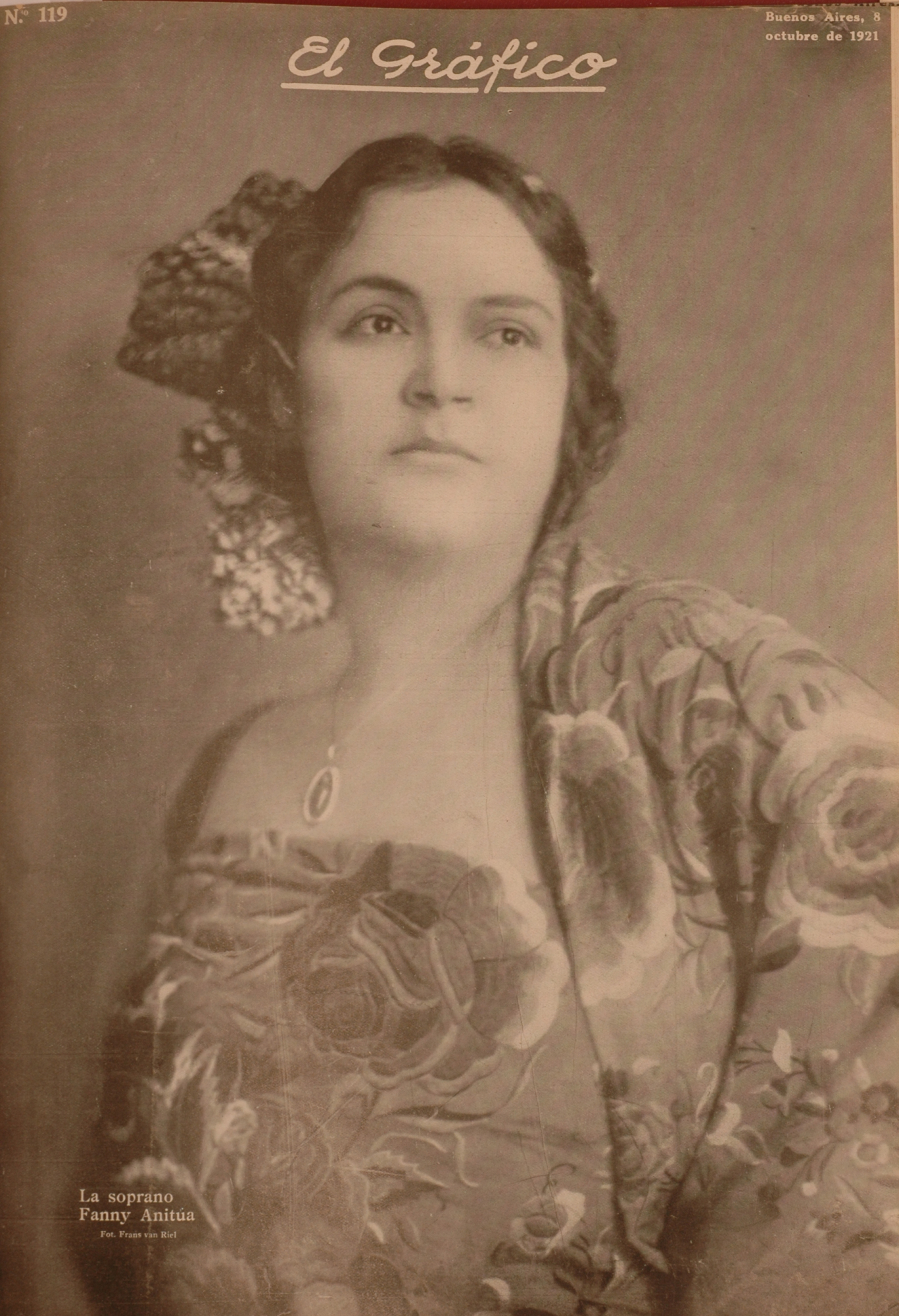
- Francisca "Fanny" Anitúa, from a 1921 publication.
- Born: January 22, 1887; Durango City
- Died: April 4, 1968 (aged 81)
- Occupation: Singer

Fanny Anitúa Yañez (22 January 1887 – 4 April 1968) was a renowned Mexican contralto opera singer.

== History ==
Francisca Anitúa was born in the city of Durango. Daughter of Antonio Sarabia Anitúa, who worked in mining, and Josefa Medrano Yanez. The father moved with his wife and two daughters to Topia, Durango, when Fanny was three years old. At age 10 she had won a radio contest and a contract to sing on a local radio station.

Anitùa initially studied singing in her native city, moving afterward to Mexico City, and later to Rome. She debuted at Teatro Nazionale in Rome in 1910, singing the role of Orfeo from the eponymous Christoph Willibald Gluck opera. She often sang at Teatro alla Scala in Milan, especially in Sigfried (1910–11 season), Etra in the first edition of Ildebrando Pizzetti's Fedra (1914–15 season), Konciakovna in Borodin's Prince Igor (1915–16 season), and besides Gluck's Orfeo, Giuseppe Verdi's Il Trovatore and Un Ballo in Maschera (1923–26 seasons).

She sang in other important Italian theaters, including Teatro Rossini in Pesaro and Teatro Regio in Parma, performing Il barbiere di Siviglia (1916) and La Cenerentola (1920), and very often in South American theaters such as Teatro Colón in Buenos Aires, especially as Olga in Tchaikovsky's Eugene Onegin (1911) and as Amneris Verdi's Aida (1939).

She has been considered one of the last true contraltos in the history of modern singing with low notes, wide and deep, with a sonorous and extended voice and with a solid technique that allowed her to perform Rossini despite the limited knowledge of coloratura at that time. One of her many students was the tenor José Sosa Esquivel.

Anitùa did not release many recordings, but there is a full edition of Carmen and a few opera pieces edited by Columbia.

== Repertoire ==
- Gluck
  - Orfeo ed Euridice
- Gioacchino Rossini
  - Il barbiere di Siviglia
  - La Cenerentola
- Giuseppe Verdi
  - Aida
  - Il trovatore
  - Un ballo in maschera
- Richard Wagner
  - Siegfried
  - Lohengrin
  - Tristan und Isolde
  - Die Walküre
- Georges Bizet
  - Carmen
- Alexander Borodin
  - Prince Igor
- Pyotr Ilyich Tchaikovsky
  - Eugene Onegin
