= Redoba =

The redoba is a percussion instrument. It consists of a wood block fixed to a belt and struck with sticks. A pair of blocks can be used to obtain two different musical notes. It is possible to dance and play at the same time. It is mainly used in conjunto norteño.
