= José Sosa Esquivel =

Mexican opera singer

José Sosa Esquivel (March 22, 1923 in Santiago de Querétaro, Querétaro – June 15, 1968 in Tampico, Mexico) was a Mexican tenor. He is best known for being the father of the famed singer José José. He died because of his alcoholism, after leaving his family.

== Career ==
Jose Sosa Esquivel studied singing with the professor José Pierson, and the contralto Fanny Anitùa, at the Academia de la Ópera de Bellas Artes (Opera Academy of Fine Arts). He debuted in 1950 at the Palacio de Bellas Artes playing the role of Azael on Debussy's L'Enfant prodigue. In 1951, he played the role of Rinuccio in the Mexican premiere of Puccini's Gianni Schicchi. He was principal tenor of the national opera and first comprimario of the international opera. He sang in the opera seasons of Bellas Artes in Mexico City, Guadalajara, Veracruz, Guanajuato and Monterrey.

In 1953, he played the roles of Prince Vasiliy Ivanovich Shuysky and Yurodivy in Boris Godunov, next to Nicola Rossi-Lemeni. In 1954, he participated in the inauguration of the Virginia Fábregas Theatre, singing the title role in Offenbach's Orpheus in the Underworld, and in 1958 at the world premiere of the "Cantata Homage to Juarez", by Blas Galindo, at the Degollado Theatre. He sang in productions like L'elisir d'amore, La traviata, Madama Butterfly in the roles of Pinkerton and Goro, Pagliacci in the role of Beppe, Mefistofele, Trionfo di Afrodite -at its premiere in Mexico-, Orphée aux Enfers, Tosca as Spoletta, L'amore dei tre re, Fedora, Andrea Chénier, L'amico Fritz, Carmina Burana and La bohème. He spanned the genres of lied, oratorio, zarzuela and operetta. He sang in Havana, Cuba, in the 1954-1957 seasons.
