= Wakal =

wakal
- Origin: Mexico City, Mexico
- Genres: House, electro, rock
- Years active: 2000–present
- Label: Discos Konfort
- Members: Jorge Govea
- Website: wakal.com

Wakal (Spanish: Huacal) is a Mexican electronic music project by Jorge Govea. He is a Mexican musician currently living and working in Paris, France, who was a founding member of the independent record label, Discos Konfort. His first album revealed the way he mixed field recording (sounds of the streets), and popular melodies with dancefloor / electro / rock rhythms.

== History ==
His album Pop Street Sound (2003) mixes Mexico City's street sounds, people's voices, and atmospheres with house, drum and bass and trip hop rhythms. It is dedicated to the people who work in the streets, such as hawkers, musicians, street comedians among others. The themes are inspired by public disorder and urban everyday life. The album cover shows a "bici-taxi", an example of all the different characters of that big city.

In 2004, the EP Remixes Paisano was published in Europe. This material includes remixes by Mexican artists from the experimental scene. The tracks are inspired by documents and official procedures needed to cross a physical border. These borders are somehow being overcome by telecommunications, and several labels (Netlabel) edit and distribute free music under Creative Commons rules. Remixes Paisano represents friendship between people of the same origin in internet times.

"Desvia Si On Again" (2006) is the title of the second album (Deviation Again?) that was distributed by French label MK2 and Discos Konfort. Its subject is "worldwide migratory phenomenon", people who move to find new spaces where to live and express themselves. The sound (Electro, Rock, Click&Cuts) includes popular melodies deconstructed and dance floor adapted. The cover shows a corrupted symbol referring to traffic signs and alarm signals.

== Discography ==
=== Albums ===
Title	Release date	Tracks	Label	Cover
Pop Street Sound	2003	14	konfort Records	
Desvia Si On Again	2006	12	konfort Records	

=== EPs ===
Year	Title	Tracks	Format	Label
2004	Remixes Paissano	"Terraza mantel" (Extended), "El tunel","Orale"	12"	Konfort Records, Filtro

=== Single ===
Year	Title	Format	Label	Cover
2023	LA MUERTE	Digital	idEA	

=== Remixes ===
Year	Artist	Title
2001	Banda el Recodo	"Recodo and I"
2004	Karras	"Noches de verano"
2005	Rumba palenquera	"Ataole"
