= Chilena (musical genre) =

Mexican musical genre

The chilena is a Mexican musical genre from the Costa Chica coastal regions of the Mexican states of Guerrero and Oaxaca, although its influence also reaches other nearby regions. Its origins lie in the cueca of Chile, whence its name. The cueca is a dance that was brought by Chilean sailors in 1822 and later by Chilean immigrants between 1848 and 1855, during the height of the California Gold Rush. They passed through the ports of Acapulco in Guerrero and Puerto Ángel, Huatulco, and Puerto Escondido in Oaxaca.
