= La Voz (Mexican TV series) season 10 =

La Voz
- Season 10
- Hosted by: Eddy Vilard; Sofía Aragón
- Coaches: María José; Miguel Bosé; Edith Márquez; Jesús Navarro
- No. of contestants: 156 artists
- Winner: Sherlyn Sánchez
- Winning coach: Edith Márquez
- Runner-up: Arturo De La Fuente

Release
- Original network: Azteca Uno
- Original release: June 1 – August 11, 2021

Season chronology
- ← Previous; Season 9 Next → Season 11

The tenth season of La Voz premiered on June 1, 2021 on Azteca Uno. María José is the only coach returning from the previous season. Miguel Bosé, Edith Márquez and Jesús Navarro joined the panel replacing Ricardo Montaner, Belinda and Christian Nodal. Eddy Vilard and Sofía Aragón both returned for their second season as hosts.

On Wednesday, August 11, 2021, Sherlyn Sánchez was announced the winner and crowned La Voz México 2021, alongside her coach Edith Márquez. This made her the youngest contestant to win the show, beating previous season winner, Fernando Sujo.

== Coaches ==
Coaches of La Voz México season 10

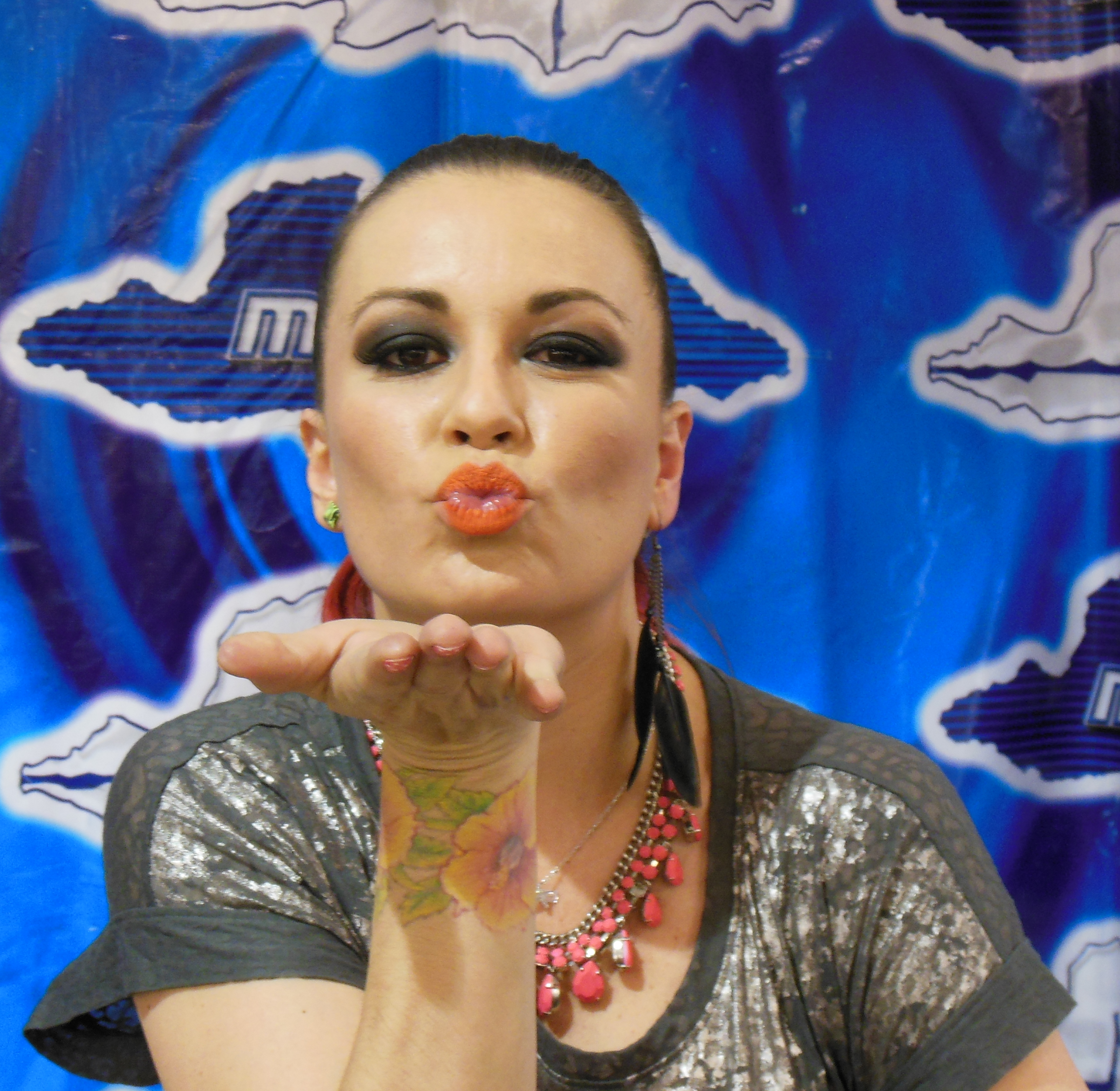
María José

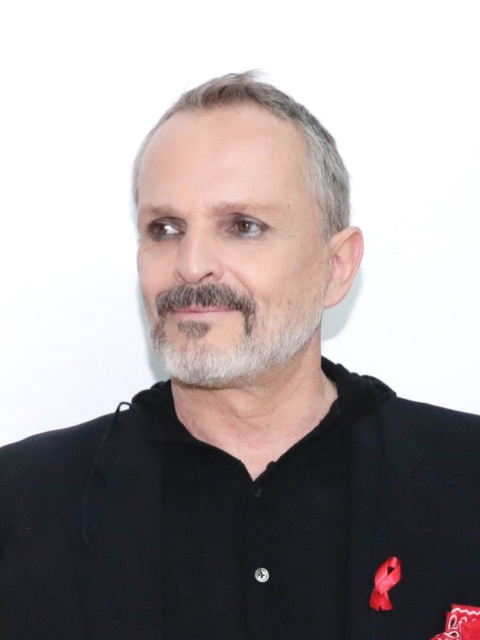
Miguel Bosé

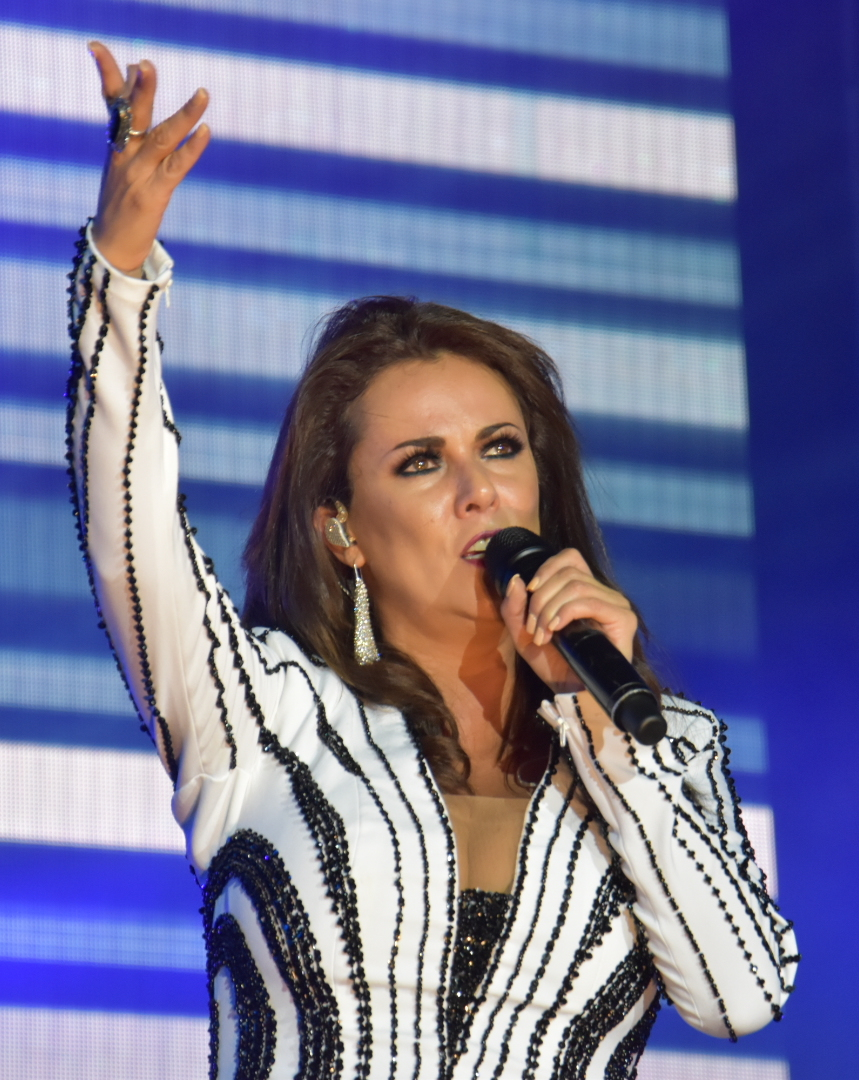
Edith Márquez

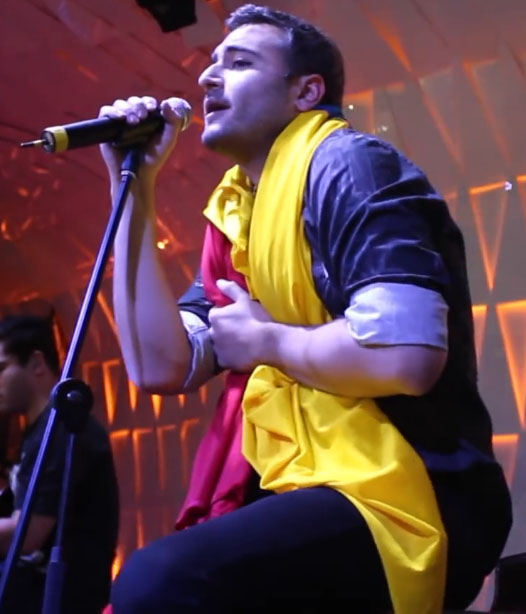
Jesús Navarro

Filming of the season started in February 2021, revealing María José as the only coach returning from the previous season, since the other three coaches had personal projects; Ricardo Montaner filming La Voz Argentina, Belinda filming a Netflix series and Christian Nodal deciding to focus on his musical career. Their replacements were season two coach Miguel Bosé, and first-time coaches Edith Márquez, and Jesús Navarro.

== Teams ==
Color key

Winner
Runner-up
Third place
Fourth place
Eliminated in the Final Phase
Eliminated in the Top 3
Stolen in the Battles
Eliminated in the Battles
Stolen in the Knockouts
Eliminated in the Knockouts
Withdrew

Coaches	Top 156 artists					
María José						
María José	Arturo De La Fuente	Ale Soto	Melina	Lheo	Lalo Fierros	Alan Ruíz
María José	Caozz	Iván Tacher	Amadeus Tijerina	Dayma Diamante	~~Óscar Romo~~	~~Fátima Aragón~~
María José	~~Vida~~	Deyra Barrera	Paulina Del Villar	Dan Steel	Ana Red	Aby Espinosa
María José	~~Rosy Vargas~~	~~Ela~~	Jeff	Zayra Frausto	Becky Lanz	Guillermo Camargo
María José	Yazmín De Los Reyes	Joss Vázquez	Francisco Avila	Daniel Yañez	Jhonatan Ortega	Edson Apdeljalek
María José	José Vicente	Las Swing Sisters	Las Holidays	Alexia	Evelin Rivera	Diego Castro
María José	Anaís Corcino	Natalia Danae	Itzayana Saint	Thalía Cota	Martha López	Miranda Labardini
María José	Alejandro Alcalá	Ari & Tony				
Miguel Bosé						
Miguel Bosé	Kike Aristi	Vida	Edeer Velásquez	Gloria	Emilio Aceves	Enero Del Moral
Miguel Bosé	Yoselin Marisol	Mike Soto	Brenda Santabalbina	Carmen Malouf	~~Caozz~~	~~Sumiko~~
Miguel Bosé	Diego Meléndez	Diego Calderón	Shankara	Jorge Mascareño	Blu Regine	Jiry
Miguel Bosé	~~Jesús Cortés~~	~~Melina Islas~~	~~Faa Espinoza~~	~~Dann Steel~~	~~Óscar Romo~~	Paco Padilla
Miguel Bosé	Moises Solís	Jaime Aziel	Still Music	Sariela Camargo	Arody Meraz	Emma Escalante
Miguel Bosé	Arák	Joe Torbell	Mafer López	Lucho Aguilera	Cons Casillas	Francisco Treviño
Miguel Bosé	Carlos Feral	Rick Loera	Josema	Maite Olalde	Karla Briseño	Héctor Castillón
Miguel Bosé	Miloh	María Julia				
Edith Márquez						
Edith Márquez	Sherlyn Sánchez	Azucena Del Toro	Dugali	Ricardo Bonilla	María De Souza	Aly Castellón
Edith Márquez	Las Valencia	Fátima Aragón	Carolina Vélez	Salvador Arreola	Ángel Eduviel	Soul FM
Edith Márquez	Faa Espinoza	Dan De Saturno	Alejandro Zapata	Alejandra Quintero	Álvaro Bautista	Melina Islas
Edith Márquez	~~Enero Del Moral~~	Alex Migliolo	Diego Bazán	Lau Larenas	Liz Saenger	Sheyla Ortíz
Edith Márquez	Jhoana Hernández	Luba	Tatiana Sierra	Carlos Luna	J.J. Ruiz & Jostín	Edén & Brandon
Edith Márquez	Cristiany Fuentes	Esmeralda Miranda	Jonathan Martínez	Carlos Ortiz	Sagrario Bello	Ricardo Bojalil
Edith Márquez	Jonathan Galván	María Antonieta	Charly "El Regio"	Lenny Serrano	Losanna	Brianda
Edith Márquez	Moe Palau	Ángel Pacheco				
Jesús Navarro						
Jesús Navarro	Arantza	Sumiko	Ela	Óscar Romo	Monica	Jahaziel Meza
Jesús Navarro	Channa	Carolina Núñez	Lizzette Montserrat	Rosy Vargas	~~Yoselin Marisol~~	~~Ricardo Bonilla~~
Jesús Navarro	~~Arturo De La Fuente~~	Alejandra Desimone	Hugo Coronel	Jesús Cortes	Annika Oviedo	Rogelio Edel
Jesús Navarro	~~Jiry~~	~~María De Souza~~	~~Brenda Santabalbina~~	~~Amadeus Tijerina~~	Paola Carlín	Desirée Hermed
Jesús Navarro	Viridiana Siqueiros	Juan Pablo	Patricio Loustalot	Las Karrum	Irenka Moro	Alan Gamboa
Jesús Navarro	Rubí Mendivil	Edna Valeria	Itzel Luu	Mariana Marín	Lena Corral	Daniela Rodriguez
Jesús Navarro	Manuel Cozar	Joanna Arizmendi	Greta Medhe	Bebi Ostos	Priscila Robles	Jako Navarro
Jesús Navarro	Alba Daniela	Rafael Castañón				
Note: Italicized names are stolen artists (names struck through within former teams).

== Blind auditions ==
In the Blind auditions, each coach had to complete their teams with 39 contestants. Each coach had two Blocks to prevent one of the other coaches from getting a contestant.

Blind auditions color key
✔	Coach pressed "QUIERO TU VOZ" button
	Artist defaulted to a coach's team
	Artist elected a coach's team
	Artist was eliminated with no coach pressing his or her "QUIERO TU VOZ" button
✘	Coach pressed the "QUIERO TU VOZ" button, but was blocked by María from getting the artist
✘	Coach pressed the "QUIERO TU VOZ" button, but was blocked by Miguel from getting the artist
✘	Coach pressed the "QUIERO TU VOZ" button, but was blocked by Edith from getting the artist
✘	Coach pressed the "QUIERO TU VOZ" button, but was blocked by Jesús from getting the artist

=== Episode 1 (June 1) ===
At the beginning of the episode, María José performed "Lo que tenías conmigo", Miguel Bosé performed "Morena mía", Edith Márquez performed "Mi error, mi fantasia" and Jesús Navarro performed "Me niego".

Order	Artist	Age	Hometown	Song	Coach's and artist's choices			
Order	Artist	Age	Hometown	Song	María José	Miguel	Edith	Jesús
1	Maite Olalde	26	Monterrey, Nuevo León	"Mala Fama"	✔	✔	–	–
2	Carlos Luna	26	Ciudad del Carmen, Campeche	"Pobre Diablo"	✔	✔	✔	–
3	María Fernanda	28	Villahermosa, Tabasco	"Se Te Salió Mi Nombre"	–	–	–	–
4	Losanna	30	Puerto Vallarta, Jalisco	"Hound Dog"	✔	✔	✔	✘
5	Liz Saenger	25	Mexico City	"Que Nadie Sepa mi Sufrir"	✔	–	✔	–
6	Ana Red	31	Ciudad Sahagún, Hidalgo	"Stayin' Alive"	✔	–	–	✔
7	Daniela Loera	26	Tijuana, Baja California	"Como te extraño mi amor"	–	–	–	–
8	Deyra Barrera	45	Villa Juárez, Sonora	"Haz lo que quieras"	✔	✔	–	✔
9	Josthin Mayoral	19	Guadalajara, Jalisco	"Soy como no soy"	–	–	–	–
10	Esmeralda Miranda	16	San Luis Río Colorado, Sonora	"Qué ganas de no verte nunca más"	–	–	✔	✔
11	Greta Medhe	36	Guadalajara, Jalisco	"Crazy"	✔	✔	✔	✔
12	Edder Velásquez	25	Oaxaca, Oaxaca	"Un Siglo Sin Ti"	–	✔	–	–
13	Jahaziel Meza	20	Hermosillo, Sonora	"AYAYAY!"	✔	–	–	✔

=== Episode 2 (June 7) ===
During the episode, Miguel Bosé performed "Nada Particular" and Reik performed "Creo en Ti".

Order	Artist	Age	Hometown	Song	Coach's and artist's choices			
Order	Artist	Age	Hometown	Song	María José	Miguel	Edith	Jesús
1	Ángel Eduviel	26	Naranjos, Veracruz	"Invisible"	✔	–	✔	–
2	Andrea Diga	19	Mexico City	"Te Vi"	–	–	–	–
3	Jako Navarro	27	Chihuahua, Chihuahua	"Fría Como el Viento"	–	–	–	✔
4	Becky Lanz	29	Mexico City	"Aún Lo Amo"	✔	–	✔	–
5	Blu Regine	25	Buenos Aires, Argentina	"When Love Takes Over"	✔	✔	✔	–
6	Dugali	28 & 31	Puebla, Puebla	"Corazón Partío"	✔	✔	✔	–
7	Daniel Yáñez	22	Maracaibo, Venezuela	"ADMV"	✔	–	–	–
8	Azucena Del Toro	40	Guadalajara, Jalisco	"Whole Lotta Love"	✔	–	✔	–
9	Rosy Vargas	24	Monterrey, Nuevo León	"Él Me Mintió"	✔	✔	✘	✔
10	Yi-Sai	27	Hermosillo, Sonora	"De Pies a Cabeza"	–	–	–	–
11	María Julia	26	Durango, Durango	"Nuestro Juramento"	–	✔	✔	–
12	Arturo De La Fuente	33	Mexico City	"When I Was Your Man"	✔	✔	✔	✔
13	Ángel Breceda	25	Mexico City	"Volverás"	–	–	–	–
14	Luba	30	Camagüey, Cuba	"Con Calma"	✔	–	✔	–

=== Episode 3 (June 8) ===
During the episode, María José performed "Sólo el Amor Lastima Así" and Jesús Navarro performed "No Desaparecerá".

Order	Artist	Age	Hometown	Song	Coach's and artist's choices			
Order	Artist	Age	Hometown	Song	María José	Miguel	Edith	Jesús
1	J.J. Ruiz & Jostín	35 & 30	Caracas, Venezuela	"Vivir Lo Nuestro"	✔	–	✔	–
2	Valentina Penagos	27	Fortín de las Flores, Veracruz	"Me Dueles"	–	–	–	–
3	Carolina Vélez	29	Monterrey, Nuevo León	"Una canción no es suficiente"	–	–	✔	–
4	Manuel Cozar	27	Veracruz, Veracruz	"Durmiendo Con La Luna"	–	–	✔	✔
5	Alejandro Alcalá	33	Ciudad Bolívar, Venezuela	"Provócame"	✔	–	✔	–
6	Lau Larenas	23	Mexico City	"Rómpeme el Corazón"	✔	–	✔	✔
7	Las Swing Sisters	–	Mexico City	"Candyman"	✔	–	✔	–
8	Juan Pablo	28	Denver, Colorado	"Amigos Con Derechos"	–	–	–	✔
9	Francisco Treviño	25	Monterrey, Nuevo León	"Natural"	✔	✔	–	–
10	Tatiana Sierra	32	Mexico City	"Me Soltaste"	–	–	✔	–
11	Irenka Moro	17	Mexico City	"Bleeding Love"	✔	✔	✔	✔
12	Los Jaggers	16 & 23	Tampico, Tamaulipas	"Por Primera Vez"	–	–	–	–
13	Dann Steel	30	Cabo San Lucas, Baja California Sur	"Adore You"	✔	✔	–	–

=== Episode 4 (June 14) ===
During the episode, Edith Márquez performed "En Una De Esas" and Jesús Navarro performed "Fui".

Order	Artist	Age	Hometown	Song	Coach's and artist's choices			
Order	Artist	Age	Hometown	Song	María José	Miguel	Edith	Jesús
1	Alejandro Zapata	23	Culiacán, Sinaloa	"Esclavo de Tus Besos"	✔	–	✔	–
2	Anaís Corcuno	26	Msxico State	"Mi Olvido"	✔	–	–	–
3	Amanda Sundberg	32	Mexico City	"Beat It"	–	–	–	–
4	Lena Corral	24	Ciudad Obregón, Sonora	"El tiempo de ti"	–	–	–	✔
5	Sheyla Ortiz	22	Mexico City	"Me Sobrabas Tú"	–	–	✔	–
6	Mike Soto	23	Mexico City	"Sucker"	–	✔	✔	–
7	Alina	–	Oaxaca, Oaxaca	"Ni Princesa Ni Esclava"	–	–	–	–
8	Óscar Romo	24	Aguascalientes, Aguascalientes	"Jamás"	✔	✔	–	–
9	Agustín Irigoyen	–	Mexico State	"Sigo Buscandote"	–	–	–	–
10	Fátima Aragón	31	Durango, Durango	"Eclipse Total de Amor"	✔	✔	✔	✔
11	Rubí Mendivil	27	Ahome, Sinaloa	"Ayer Pedí"	–	✔	–	✔
12	Francisco Avila	26	Durango, Durango	"Hello"	✔	–	–	–
13	Dan de Saturno	21	Monterrey, Nuevo León	"A Natural Woman"	–	–	✔	✔
14	Adrian & Andrew	17 & 26	Tijuana, Baja California	Tequila	–	–	–	–
15	Aby Espinoza	24	Minatitlán, Veracruz	"Volver a Amar"	✔	–	✔	✔
16	Paco Padilla	20	Ciudad Victoria, Tamaulipas	"Aunque Ahora Estes Con El"	–	✔	–	–
17	Jonathan Galván	33	Hermosillo, Sonora	"Si Tú No Vuelves"	–	–	✔	–
18	Ari Benedik & Tony Rosher	35 & 37	Puebla, Puebla	"Amiga Mía"	✔	✔	✔	–
19	Priscila Robles	25	Chihuahua, Chihuahua	"My Heart Will Go On"	✔	✔	✔	✔

=== Episode 5 (June 15) ===
During the episode, María José performed "Lo Que Te Mereces" and Edith Márquez performed "Entiende Que Ya".

Order	Artist	Age	Hometown	Song	Coach's and artist's choices			
Order	Artist	Age	Hometown	Song	María José	Miguel	Edith	Jesús
1	Thalía Cota	32	Guasave, Sinaloa	"Proud Mary"	✔	–	–	✔
2	Carlos León	29	Durango, Durango	"Valió la Pena"	–	–	–	–
3	Karla Briseño	22	Querétaro, Querétaro	"Summertime"	–	✔	–	–
4	Aly Castellón	26	Guadalajara, Jalisco	"Te Presumo"	-	–	✔	–
5	Miloh	24	Rionegro, Colombia	"Un Año"	✔	✔	✔	–
6	Hugo Coronel	22	Culiacán, Sinaloa	"Para qué Lastimarme"	–	–	–	✔
7	Moe Palau	26	Mexico City	"Lovefool"	✔	–	✔	–
8	Joss Vázquez	27	Ciudad Juárez, Chihuahua	"No Me Compares"	✔	✔	✔	–
9	Kike Aristi	35	Cancún, Quintana Roo	"Always"	✔	✔	–	–
10	Ivonne Barba	40	Mazatlán, Sinaloa	"Entoces Que Somos"	–	–	–	–
11	Jhoana Hernández	22	Cerro Azul, Veracruz	"Si Tu No Estas"	✔	–	✔	–
12	Jhonatan Ortega	26	León, Guanajuato	"Te Quise Olvidar"	✔	–	–	–
13	Caozz	24	Torreón, Coahulia	"Miss You"	✔	✔	✔	✔
14	Esram		Guadalajara, Jalisco	"Aqui Abajo"	–	–	–	–
15	Itzel Luu	25	Guasave, Sinaloa	"Pienso En Ti"	–	–	–	✔
16	J Jun	25	South Korea	"Murió La Flor"	–	–	–	–
17	Alan Gamboa	26	Monterrey, Nuevo León	"Tu Amor Me Hace Bien"	–	–	–	✔
18	Vida	24	Havana, Cuba	"Stone Cold"	✔	✔	✔	✘

=== Episode 6 (June 21) ===
During the episode, María José performed "Me Equivoqué".

Order	Artist	Age	Hometown	Song	Coach's and artist's choices			
Order	Artist	Age	Hometown	Song	María José	Miguel	Edith	Jesús
1	Alejandra Quintero	35	Mexico State	"No te contaron mal"	—	✔	✔	✔
2	Danny Turrubiantes	31	Villa Manuel, Tamaulipas	"Detenedla Ya"	–	–	–	–
3	Lheo (Chuy, Pastrana, Adrían)	23, 24, 24	Durango, Villahermosa, Monterrey	"Hawái"	✔	✔	–	–
4	Maia San Miguel	28	Mexico City	"Mala Santa"	–	–	–	–
5	Ricardo Bonilla	29	Monterrey, Nuevo León	"Fast Car"	✔	✔	✔	✔
6	Sariela Camargo	32	Tulum, Quintana Roo	"Ingrata"	✔	✔	✔	–
7	Enero del Moral	25	San Francisco, Guanajuato	"Así No Te Amara Jamás"	✘	–	✔	–
8	Alexia	22	Mexico City	"Me Olvidarás"	✔	–	–	–
9	Still Music	–	Culiacán, Sinaloa	"Me estoy enamorando"	✔	✔	✔	–
10	Brenda Santabalbina	27	Mexico City	"Si tú me quisieras"	✔	–	–	✔
11	Iván Tacher	38	Cuernavaca, Morelos	"Fallin'"	✔	–	–	–
12	Gloria	21	Hermosillo, Sonora	"Aprovéchate"	✔	✔	✔	✔
13	Amadeus Tijerina	19	Monterrey, Nuevo León	"There's Nothing Holdin' Me Back"	–	–	–	✔
14	Carmen Malouf	19	Mexico City	"De que me sirve la vida"	✔	✔	✔	✔
15	Daniela Salinas	28	Monterrey, Nuevo León	"Vuélveme a Querer"	–	–	–	–
16	Ricardo Bojalil	26	Puebla, Puebla	"Bailar Pegados"	–	–	✔	–
17	Sumiko	20	Chihuahua, Chihuahua	"Try a Little Tenderness"	✔	✔	✔	✔

=== Episode 7 (June 22) ===
During the episode, María José performed "La Ocasión Para Amarnos" and Reik performed "Ya me enteré".

Order	Artist	Age	Hometown	Song	Coach's and artist's choices			
Order	Artist	Age	Hometown	Song	María José	Miguel	Edith	Jesús
1	Emma Escalante	34	Hermosillo, Sonora	"Inolvidable"	–	✔	✔	–
2	Edre Bueno	23	Durango, Durango	"Aunque no te pueda ver"	–	–	–	–
3	María Antonieta	26	Mexico City	"Como Olvidar"	–	–	✔	–
4	Yoselin Marisol	22	Culiacán, Sinaloa	"Con Los Años Que Me Quedan"	–	–	✔	✔
5	Dayma Diamante	50	Cancún, Quintana Roo	"Bonito y Sabroso"	✔	–	–	–
6	Arody Meraz	29	Veracruz, Veracruz	"Mi historia entre tus dedos "	–	✔	–	–
7	Ángel Villoria	21	Caracas, Venezuela	"Darte un Beso"	–	–	–	–
8	Las Holidays	26, 31, 22	Monterrey, Nuevo León	"No Debes Jugar"	✔	–	✔	–
9	Vicky Roma	26	Mexico State	"La de la Mala Suerte"	–	–	–	–
10	Jaime Aziel	22	Ensenada, Baja California	"Solamente Tú"	✔	✔	✔	–
11	Charly "El Regio"	39	Monterrey, Nuevo León	"Me Está Gustando"	–	–	✔	–
12	Jesús Cortés	25	Guadalajara, Jalisco	"Granada"	–	✔	✔	–
13	Soul FM (Marco & Frank)	–	Chihuahua, Chihuahua	"Al Final Del Camino"	–	–	✔	–
14	Melina	25	Veracruz, Veracruz	"Who's Lovin' You"	✔	✔	✔	✔
15	Majo Ávila	25	Mexico City	"Cancioncitas de Amor"	–	–	–	–
16	Ela	19	Guaymas, Sonora	"Where Is the Love?"	✔	–	✔	✔
17	Jonathan Martinez	20	Ciudad del Carmen, Campeche	"Devuélveme El Corazón"	–	–	✔	–
18	Paola Carlín	22	Aguascalientes, Aguascalientes	"Anyone"	✔	✘	✔	✔

=== Episode 8 (June 28) ===
During the episode, Miguel Bosé performed "Te Amaré" and Jesús Navarro performed "Con Los Años Que Me Quedan".

Order	Artist	Age	Hometown	Song	Coach's and artist's choices			
Order	Artist	Age	Hometown	Song	María José	Miguel	Edith	Jesús
1	Zayra Frausto	36	Nogales, Sonora	"¿A quien?"	✔	–	✔	–
2	Zeniff	27	Villahermosa, Tabasco	"Chantaje"	–	–	–	–
3	Héctor Castillón	26	Compostela, Nayarit	"Bailando Solo"	–	✔	–	–
4	La Sheira Escobar	18	Altamira, Tamaulipas	"Insensible a ti"	–	–	–	–
5	Moises Solís	20	Guadalajara, Jalisco	"We Belong Together"	–	✔	–	–
6	Mariana Marín	23	Huatulco, Oaxaca	"Algo Contigo"	–	–	✔	✔
7	Diego Meléndez	21	Saltillo, Coahuila	"Completamente enamorados"	✔	✔	–	–
8	Martha López	23	Reynosa, Tamaulipas	"A Cambio de Que"	✔	✔	–	–
9	Rogelio Edel	25	Monterrey, Nuevo León	"You're the Inspiration"	✔	–	–	✔
10	Salvador Arreola	35	Monterrey, Nuevo León	"Mientes tan bien"	–	–	✔	–
11	Arantza	26	Mexico State	"Man in the Mirror"	✔	–	–	✔
12	Juana Recondo	27	Buenos Aires, Argentina	"Superstition"	–	–	–	–
13	Ángel Pacheco	31	Tampico, Tamaulipas	"Llegaste tú"	–	–	✔	–
14	Lizzette Montserrat	19	Tampico, Tamaulipas	"Blanco y Negro"	–	–	–	✔
15	Emilio Aceves	28	Guadalajara, Jalisco	"Lovely"	✔	✔	–	–
16	Itzayana Saint	31	Aguascalientes, Aguascalientes	"Physical"	✔	✔	–	✔
17	Lolish	–	Tecomán, Colima	"Ocean"	–	–	–	–
18	Carolina Núñez	32	Durango, Durango	"A Mi Manera"	–	–	–	✔
19	Cons Casillas	21	Mexico City	"Perfect"	–	✔	–	–
20	Edson Apdeljalek	26	Xicotepec, Puebla	"Amores Como el Nuestro"	✔	✔	✔	✔

=== Episode 9 (June 29) ===
During the episode, María José performed "Tú Ya Sabes a Mí" and Edith Márquez performed "Aunque Sea En Otra Vida".

Order	Artist	Age	Hometown	Song	Coach's and artist's choices			
Order	Artist	Age	Hometown	Song	María José	Miguel	Edith	Jesús
1	Evelin Rivera	22	Chihuahua, Chihuahua	"Tanto Amor"	✔	–	–	✔
2	Bebi Ostos	37	Córdoba, Veracruz	"Amor Prohibido"	–	–	–	✔
3	Lucho Aguilera	24	Aguascalientes, Aguascalientes	"Me Hace Tanto Bien"	–	✔	–	–
4	Cristiany Fuentes	19	Piedras Negras, Coahuila	"Fuera de mi vida"	–	–	✔	–
5	Patricio Loustalot	19	Mexico City	"T.N.T."	✔	–	–	✔
6	The Givers	–	Mérida, Yucatán	"Caramelo"	–	–	–	–
7	Alan Ruiz	24	Monterrey, Nuevo León	"¿Quién Te Dijo Eso?"	✔	–	–	–
8	Channa	24	Cancún, Quintana Roo	"I Knew You Were Trouble"	–	–	✔	✔
9	Jeff	35	Medellín, Colombia	"Fuiste Mía"	✔	–	✔	–
10	Angie Camille	20	Monterrey, Nuevo León	"Lo Que Paso, Paso"	–	–	–	–
11	Carlos Ortiz	22	Chihuahua, Chihuahua	"Lost on You"	✔	✔	✔	–
12	Miranda Lobardini	24	Orizaba, Veracruz	"Cabaret"	✔	–	–	–
13	Krystal Avalos	27	Pachuca, Hidalgo	"Cryin'"	–	–	–	–
14	Diego Calderon	22	Aguascalientes, Aguascalientes	"Fruto Robado"	✔	✔	–	✔
15	Josema	40	San José, Costa Rica	"Yellow Ledbetter"	–	✔	–	–
16	Jiry	27	Cancún, Quintana Roo	"Cheap Thrills"	–	–	–	✔
17	Lalo Fierros	28	Obregón, Sonora	"El Préstamo"	✔	✔	–	–
18	Edna Valeria	19	Mexicali, Baja California	"Esta Noche Se Me Olvida"	✔	✔	✔	✔

=== Episode 10 (July 5) ===
During the episode, Jesús Navarro performed "Contigo en la Distancia".

Order	Artist	Age	Hometown	Song	Coach's and artist's choices			
Order	Artist	Age	Hometown	Song	María José	Miguel	Edith	Jesús
1	Mónica Garcés	37	Tamiahua, Veracruz	"Tú sí sabes quererme"	✔	✔	✔	✔
2	Santos Guzmán	23	Monterrey, Nuevo León	"Seremos"	–	–	–	–
3	Las Valencia	–	Guaymas, Sonora	"Contigo"	–	–	✔	–
4	Arák	48	Hermosillo, Sonora	"El hombre del piano"	–	✔	–	–
5	José Vicente	20	Tuxtepec, Oaxaca	"Te dirán"	✔	✔	–	–
6	Sara Luque	25	Mexico City	"All I Ask"	–	–	–	–
7	Paulina Del Villar	16	Cancún, Quintana Roo	"Hasta La Raíz"	✔	✔	–	–
8	Mafer López	20	San Cristóbal, Chiapas	"En Está No"	✔	✔	–	✔
9	Alba Daniela	21	Navojoa, Sonora	"Demasiado Tarde"	✔	–	–	✔
10	Sagrario Bello	58	Tehuacán, Puebla	"Unchain My Heart"	–	–	✔	✔
11	Guillermo Camargo	37	Mexico City	"Tengo que colgar"	✔	–	–	–
12	Álvaro Bautista	34	Guadalajara, Jalisco	"Me va a extrañar"	–	–	✔	✔
13	Annika Oviedo	15	Agua Prieta, Sonora	"Someone You Loved"	–	–	–	✔
14	Christopher Torres	18	Mexicali, Baja California	"La Mitad Que Me Faltaba"	–	–	–	–
15	Alejandra Desimone	24	Mexico City	"El Amor Manda"	–	✘	–	✔
16	Daniela Rodriguez	26	Mexico City	"Un Sueño Que Alguna Vez Soñé"	–	–	–	✔
17	Joe Torbell	19	Querétaro, Querétaro	"Ben"	–	✔	–	–
18	Sherlyn Sánchez	16	Los Mochis, Sinaloa	"Culpable o inocente"	–	–	✔	✔
19	Darinka	27	Coatzacoalcos, Veracruz	"El Lo Tiene Todo"	–	–	–	–
20	Carlos Feral	36	Guadalajara, Jalisco	"Umbrella"	✔	✔	✔	✔
21	Natalia Danae	26	Poza Rica, Veracruz	"Por Última Vez"	✔	–	–	–

=== Episode 11 (July 6) ===
During the episode, María José performed "Las Que Se Ponen Bien La Falda" and Edith Márquez performed "¿Quieres ser mi Amante?".

Order	Artist	Age	Hometown	Song	Coach's and artist's choices			
Order	Artist	Age	Hometown	Song	María José	Miguel	Edith	Jesús
1	Las Karrum (Nadia & Diana)	16 & 17	Torreón, Coahuila	"Cuando un Hombre Te Enamora"	–	–	–	✔
2	Diego Castro	19	Culiacán, Sinaloa	"Cristina"	✔	✔	–	–
3	Lenny Serrano	31	Durango, Durango	"Enamorada y herida"	–	–	✔	–
4	Viridiana Siqueiros	29	Guaymas, Sonora	"Don't Let Me Down"	–	✔	–	✔
5	Alex Migliolo	31	Tampico, Tamaulipas	"Solo Tú"	–	–	✔	–
6	Rick Loera	33	Mexico City	"Your Love"	–	✔	✔	✔
7	Yazmín De Los Reyes	21	Hermosillo, Sonora	"Si Yo Fuera Un Chico"	✔	–	–	–
8	Shankara	27	León, Guanajuato	"I Put a Spell on You"	✔	✔	✔	✔
9	Romez	25	Guadalajara, Jalisco	"Amor Tóxico"	–	–	–	–
10	María de Souza	57	Mexico City	"Like a Prayer"	–	–	–	✔
11	Jorge Mascareño	26	Los Mochis, Sinaloa	"Me cambiaste la vida"	✔	✔	–	✔
12	Fátima Trujillo	19	Veracruz, Veracruz	"No puedo olvidarlo"	–	–	–	–
13	Diego Bazán	33	Tijuana, Baja California	"Abrázame"	✔	✔	✔	✔
14	Faa Espinoza	30	Guaymas, Sonora	"No Me Queda Más"	–	✔	–	–
15	Desirée Hermed	20	Ciudad Hidalgo, Michoacán	"Déjame volver contigo"	–	–	–	✔
16	Brianda	30	Matamos, Tamaulipas	"Virtual Insanity"	✘	–	✔	✔
17	Gaby Valdez	33	Ciudad Obregón, Sonora	"Todo lo que hago por ti"	–	–	–	–
18	Ale Soto	24	Guadalajara, Jalisco	"Me and Mrs. Jones"	✔	✔	✔	✘
19	Eden & Brandon	18 & 25	Guadalajara, Jalisco	"¿Como te atreves?"	Team full	–	✔	✔
20	Melina Islas	28	Ciudad Obregón, Sonora	"Blue Bayou"	Team full	✔	Team full	✔
21	Joanna Arizmendi	37	Mexico State	"Por Que No Le Calas"	Team full	Team full	Team full	✔

== Knockouts ==
The knockouts round started July 12. In this round, coaches can steal three losing artists from other coaches. Contestants who win their knockout or are stolen by another coach advance to the Battles.

Knockouts color key
Artist won the Knockout and advanced to the Battles
Artist lost the Knockout but was stolen by another coach and advanced to the Battles
Artist lost the Knockout and was eliminated
Artist voluntarily left the competition

Episode	Coach	Order	Song	Winner	Losers	Song	'Steal' result			
Episode	Coach	Order	Song	Winner	Losers	Song	María José	Miguel	Edith	Jesús
Episode 12 (Monday, July 12, 2021)	María José	1	"Llorarás"	Dayma Diamante	Ari & Tony	"Para alcanzarte"	N/A	—	—	—
Episode 12 (Monday, July 12, 2021)	María José	1	"Llorarás"	Dayma Diamante	Alejandro Alcála	"Tratar de Estar Mejor"	N/A	—	—	—
Episode 12 (Monday, July 12, 2021)	Miguel Bosé	2	"Living on My Own"	Caozz	Miloh	"Sola"	—	N/A	—	—
Episode 12 (Monday, July 12, 2021)	Miguel Bosé	2	"Living on My Own"	Caozz	María Julia	"Pa Ti No Estoy"	—	N/A	—	—
Episode 12 (Monday, July 12, 2021)	Jesús Navarro	3	"Para empezar"	Hugo Coronel	Amadeus Tijerina	"Se te olvidó"	✔	✔	—	N/A
Episode 12 (Monday, July 12, 2021)	Jesús Navarro	3	"Para empezar"	Hugo Coronel	Alba Daniela	"Lo Aprendí de Ti"	—	—	—	N/A
Episode 12 (Monday, July 12, 2021)	Edith Márquez	4	"100 Años"	Dugali	Moe Palau	"Amor a la Mexicana"	—	—	N/A	—
Episode 12 (Monday, July 12, 2021)	Edith Márquez	4	"100 Años"	Dugali	Ángel Pacheco	"Sueña"	—	—	N/A	—
Episode 12 (Monday, July 12, 2021)	Miguel Bosé	5	"Abriré La Puerta"	Edeer Velásquez	Héctor Castillón	"Quiero Dormir Cansado"	—	N/A	—	—
Episode 12 (Monday, July 12, 2021)	Miguel Bosé	5	"Abriré La Puerta"	Edeer Velásquez	Oscar Romo	"Que Nivel de Mujer"	✔	N/A	—	✔
Episode 12 (Monday, July 12, 2021)	Jesús Navarro	6	"Esta Ausencia"	Arturo De La Fuente	Jako Navarro	"Me Muero"	—	—	—	N/A
Episode 12 (Monday, July 12, 2021)	Jesús Navarro	6	"Esta Ausencia"	Arturo De La Fuente	Brenda Santabalbina	"Ahora entendí"	—	✔	—	N/A
Episode 12 (Monday, July 12, 2021)	María José	7	"Run to You"	Vida	Martha López	"Ese Beso"	N/A	—	—	—
Episode 12 (Monday, July 12, 2021)	María José	7	"Run to You"	Vida	Miranda Labardini	"Como una ola"	N/A	—	—	—
Episode 12 (Monday, July 12, 2021)	Edith Márquez	8	"Antes de Ti"	Dan De Saturno	Losanna	"Something's Got a Hold on Me"	—	—	N/A	—
Episode 12 (Monday, July 12, 2021)	Edith Márquez	8	"Antes de Ti"	Dan De Saturno	Brianda	"I Wish"	—	—	N/A	—
Episode 12 (Monday, July 12, 2021)	Miguel Bosé	9	"Purple Rain"	Sumiko	Dann Steel	"Infinitamente Tuyo"	✔	N/A	✔	✔
Episode 12 (Monday, July 12, 2021)	Miguel Bosé	9	"Purple Rain"	Sumiko	Karla Briseño	"Mentira"	—	N/A	—	—
Episode 13 (Tuesday, July 13, 2021)	María José	1	"Love On Top"	Melina	Itzayana Saint	"Invéntame"	Team full	—	—	—
Episode 13 (Tuesday, July 13, 2021)	María José	1	"Love On Top"	Melina	Thalia Cota	"Time After Time"	Team full	—	—	—
Episode 13 (Tuesday, July 13, 2021)	Edith Márquez	2	"Matalos"	Aly Castellón	Lenny Serrano	"Detrás de Mi Ventana"	Team full	—	N/A	—
Episode 13 (Tuesday, July 13, 2021)	Edith Márquez	2	"Matalos"	Aly Castellón	Charly "El Regio"	"Ojos Verdes"	Team full	—	N/A	—
Episode 13 (Tuesday, July 13, 2021)	María José	3	"Engañémoslo"	Deyra Barrera	Anais Corcino	"A Lo Mejor"	Team full	—	—	—
Episode 13 (Tuesday, July 13, 2021)	María José	3	"Engañémoslo"	Deyra Barrera	Natalia Danae	"Como Me Haces Falta"	Team full	—	—	—
Episode 13 (Tuesday, July 13, 2021)	Miguel Bosé	4	"Solamente una vez"	Diego Calderón	Faa Espinoza	"Tú"	Team full	N/A	✔	—
Episode 13 (Tuesday, July 13, 2021)	Miguel Bosé	4	"Solamente una vez"	Diego Calderón	Maite Olalde	"O Ella o Yo"	Team full	N/A	—	—
Episode 13 (Tuesday, July 13, 2021)	Jesús Navarro	5	"La Venia Bendita"	Carolina Nuñéz	Priscila Robles	"Inolvidable"	Team full	—	—	N/A
Episode 13 (Tuesday, July 13, 2021)	Jesús Navarro	5	"La Venia Bendita"	Carolina Nuñéz	Bebi Ostos	"Te Equivocaste"	Team full	—	—	N/A
Episode 13 (Tuesday, July 13, 2021)	Miguel Bosé	6	"Human"	Emilio Aceves	Josema	"Born to Be Wild"	Team full	N/A	—	—
Episode 13 (Tuesday, July 13, 2021)	Miguel Bosé	6	"Human"	Emilio Aceves	Rick Loera	"Somebody to Love"	Team full	N/A	—	—
Episode 13 (Tuesday, July 13, 2021)	María José	7	"¡Corre!"	Paulina Del Villar	Diego Castro	"Sólo Déjate Amar"	Team full	—	—	—
Episode 13 (Tuesday, July 13, 2021)	María José	7	"¡Corre!"	Paulina Del Villar	Ela	"Amárrame"	Team full	—	✔	✔
Episode 13 (Tuesday, July 13, 2021)	Edith Márquez	8	"Perdóname"	Álvaro Bautista	María Antonieta	"¿De Qué Me Sirve el Cielo?"	Team full	—	N/A	—
Episode 13 (Tuesday, July 13, 2021)	Edith Márquez	8	"Perdóname"	Álvaro Bautista	Jonathan Galván	"Me Acordaré de Ti"	Team full	—	N/A	—
Episode 13 (Tuesday, July 13, 2021)	Jesús Navarro	9	"Pena Negra"	Mónica Garcés	Greta Medhe	"I Got You (I Feel Good)"	Team full	—	—	N/A
Episode 13 (Tuesday, July 13, 2021)	Jesús Navarro	9	"Pena Negra"	Mónica Garcés	María De Souza	"Don't Rain on My Parade"	Team full	—	✔	N/A
Episode 14 (Monday, July 19, 2021)	Jesús Navarro	1	"Girl on Fire"	Arantza	Joanna	"Como Tu Mujer"	Team full	—	—	N/A
Episode 14 (Monday, July 19, 2021)	Jesús Navarro	1	"Girl on Fire"	Arantza	Manuel Cozar	"Vida Loca"	Team full	—	—	N/A
Episode 14 (Monday, July 19, 2021)	Edith Márquez	2	"Funeral"	Azucena Del Toro	Ricardo Bojalil	"Recuérdame"	Team full	—	N/A	—
Episode 14 (Monday, July 19, 2021)	Edith Márquez	2	"Funeral"	Azucena Del Toro	Sagrario Bello	"Aunque No Sea Conmigo"	Team full	—	N/A	—
Episode 14 (Monday, July 19, 2021)	María José	3	"Como Tú"	Aby Espinosa	Evelin Rivera	"Rómpeme, Mátame"	Team full	—	—	—
Episode 14 (Monday, July 19, 2021)	María José	3	"Como Tú"	Aby Espinosa	Alexia	"Ni Guerra Ni Paz"	Team full	—	—	—
Episode 14 (Monday, July 19, 2021)	Miguel Bosé	4	"Aun"	Kike Aristi	Carlos Feral	"Tu cabeza en mi hombro"	Team full	N/A	—	—
Episode 14 (Monday, July 19, 2021)	Miguel Bosé	4	"Aun"	Kike Aristi	Francisco Treviño	"Heathens"	Team full	N/A	—	—
Episode 14 (Monday, July 19, 2021)	María José	5	"Holy"	Lheo	Las Holidays	"Sway"	Team full	—	—	—
Episode 14 (Monday, July 19, 2021)	María José	5	"Holy"	Lheo	Las Swing Sisters	"Hit the Road Jack"	Team full	—	—	—
Episode 14 (Monday, July 19, 2021)	Edith Márquez	6	"Es Mejor Así"	Alejandro Zapata	Carlos Ortiz	"Todo a pulmón"	Team full	—	N/A	—
Episode 14 (Monday, July 19, 2021)	Edith Márquez	6	"Es Mejor Así"	Alejandro Zapata	Jonathan Martínez	"Ya es muy tarde"	Team full	—	N/A	—
Episode 14 (Monday, July 19, 2021)	Jesús Navarro	7	"Sunday Morning"	Ricardo Bonilla	Jiry	"Hasta la Piel"	Team full	✔	—	N/A
Episode 14 (Monday, July 19, 2021)	Jesús Navarro	7	"Sunday Morning"	Ricardo Bonilla	Daniela Rodriguez	"No Se Si Es Amor"	Team full	—	—	N/A
Episode 14 (Monday, July 19, 2021)	Edith Márquez	8	"En Peligro de Extinción"	Sherlyn Sánchez	Esmeralda Miranda	"Amiga Mía"	Team full	—	—	—
Episode 14 (Monday, July 19, 2021)	Edith Márquez	8	"En Peligro de Extinción"	Sherlyn Sánchez	Cristiany Fuentes	"Sentimientos"	Team full	—	—	—
Episode 14 (Monday, July 19, 2021)	Miguel Bosé	9	"Sweet Dreams"	Blu Regine	Cons Casillas	"Luna"	Team full	N/A	—	—
Episode 14 (Monday, July 19, 2021)	Miguel Bosé	9	"Sweet Dreams"	Blu Regine	Melina Islas	"Quizás, Quizás, Quizás"	Team full	N/A	✔	—
Episode 15 (Tuesday, July 20, 2021)	Jesús Navarro	1	"Stuck with U"	Annika Oviedo	Lena Corral	"Ex de Verdad"	Team full	—	Team full	N/A
Episode 15 (Tuesday, July 20, 2021)	Jesús Navarro	1	"Stuck with U"	Annika Oviedo	Mariana Marín	"La Mentira"	Team full	—	Team full	N/A
Episode 15 (Tuesday, July 20, 2021)	María José	2	"La Malquerida"	Alan Ruíz	José Vicente	"¿Cómo Pagarte?"	Team full	—	Team full	—
Episode 15 (Tuesday, July 20, 2021)	María José	2	"La Malquerida"	Alan Ruíz	Edson Apdeljalek	"A Puro Dolor"	Team full	—	Team full	—
Episode 15 (Tuesday, July 20, 2021)	Edith Márquez	3	"No Puedo Dejarte de Amar"	Soul FM	Edén & Brandon	"Deja que te bese"	Team full	—	Team full	—
Episode 15 (Tuesday, July 20, 2021)	Edith Márquez	3	"No Puedo Dejarte de Amar"	Soul FM	J.J. Ruiz & Jostin	"Échame la Culpa"	Team full	—	Team full	—
Episode 15 (Tuesday, July 20, 2021)	Miguel Bosé	4	"Te Voy A Perder"	Jorge Mascareño	Lucho Aguilera	"Sería Más Fácil"	Team full	N/A	Team full	—
Episode 15 (Tuesday, July 20, 2021)	Miguel Bosé	4	"Te Voy A Perder"	Jorge Mascareño	Jesús Cortés	"Si Me Dejas Ahora"	Team full	N/A	Team full	✔
Episode 15 (Tuesday, July 20, 2021)	Jesús Navarro	5	"Equivocada"	Lizzette Montserrat	Edna Valeria	"Me Dejé Llevar"	Team full	—	Team full	N/A
Episode 15 (Tuesday, July 20, 2021)	Jesús Navarro	5	"Equivocada"	Lizzette Montserrat	Itzel Luu	"Sin Ti"	Team full	—	Team full	N/A
Episode 15 (Tuesday, July 20, 2021)	María José	6	"Isn't She Lovely"	Ana Red	Jhonatan Ortega	"Fuerte no soy"	Team full	—	Team full	—
Episode 15 (Tuesday, July 20, 2021)	María José	6	"Isn't She Lovely"	Ana Red	Daniel Yañez	"Burbujas de Amor"	Team full	—	Team full	—
Episode 15 (Tuesday, July 20, 2021)	Miguel Bosé	7	"Non, je ne regrette rien"	Carmen Malouf	Mafer López	"Vuelve"	Team full	N/A	Team full	—
Episode 15 (Tuesday, July 20, 2021)	Miguel Bosé	7	"Non, je ne regrette rien"	Carmen Malouf	Joe Torbell	"Si Tú Te Vas"	Team full	N/A	Team full	—
Episode 15 (Tuesday, July 20, 2021)	Edith Márquez	8	"Cuando Fuimos Nada"	Ángel Eduviel	Carlos Luna	"Ciego"	Team full	—	Team full	—
Episode 15 (Tuesday, July 20, 2021)	Edith Márquez	8	"Cuando Fuimos Nada"	Ángel Eduviel	Enero Del Moral	"Lloran Las Rosas"	Team full	✔	Team full	—
Episode 16 (Wednesday, July 21, 2021)	Miguel Bosé	1	"Mala Hierba"	Shankara	Arák	"Maldita primavera"	Team full	Team full	Team full	—
Episode 16 (Wednesday, July 21, 2021)	Miguel Bosé	1	"Mala Hierba"	Shankara	Emma Escalante	"Si Te Pudiera Mentir"	Team full	Team full	Team full	—
Episode 16 (Wednesday, July 21, 2021)	Jesús Navarro	2	"Loco Enamorado"	Jahaziel Meza	Rubí Mendivil	"Ámame una Vez Más"	Team full	Team full	Team full	N/A
Episode 16 (Wednesday, July 21, 2021)	Jesús Navarro	2	"Loco Enamorado"	Jahaziel Meza	Alan Gamboa	"Te hubieras ido antes"	Team full	Team full	Team full	N/A
Episode 16 (Wednesday, July 21, 2021)	Edith Márquez	3	"Sin él"	Alejandra Quintero	Tatiana Sierra	"Doy un Paso Atrás"	Team full	Team full	Team full	—
Episode 16 (Wednesday, July 21, 2021)	Edith Márquez	3	"Sin él"	Alejandra Quintero	Luba	"La Gata Bajo La Lluvia"	Team full	Team full	Team full	—
Episode 16 (Wednesday, July 21, 2021)	María José	4	"Disparo al Corazón"	Lalo Fierros	Francisco Ávila	"Heroe"	Team full	Team full	Team full	—
Episode 16 (Wednesday, July 21, 2021)	María José	4	"Disparo al Corazón"	Lalo Fierros	Joss Vázquez	"How Deep Is Your Love"	Team full	Team full	Team full	—
Episode 16 (Wednesday, July 21, 2021)	Jesús Navarro	5	"Ya Es Muy Tarde"	Yoselin Marisol	Irenka Moro	"Empiezo a recordarte"	Team full	Team full	Team full	N/A
Episode 16 (Wednesday, July 21, 2021)	Jesús Navarro	5	"Ya Es Muy Tarde"	Yoselin Marisol	Las Karrum	"Te Esperé"	Team full	Team full	Team full	N/A
Episode 16 (Wednesday, July 21, 2021)	Edith Márquez	6	"Lo Que Tenías Conmigo"	Las Valencia	Jhoana Hernández	"Arrullo de estrellas"	Team full	Team full	Team full	—
Episode 16 (Wednesday, July 21, 2021)	Edith Márquez	6	"Lo Que Tenías Conmigo"	Las Valencia	Sheyla Ortíz	"Si Una Vez"	Team full	Team full	Team full	—
Episode 16 (Wednesday, July 21, 2021)	Miguel Bosé	7	"Por Qué Me Fui a Enamorar de Ti"	Gloria	Arody Meraz	"Esa Noche"	Team full	Team full	Team full	—
Episode 16 (Wednesday, July 21, 2021)	Miguel Bosé	7	"Por Qué Me Fui a Enamorar de Ti"	Gloria	Sariela Camargo	"Lo Que Construimos"	Team full	Team full	Team full	—
Episode 16 (Wednesday, July 21, 2021)	María José	8	"At Last"	Ale Soto	Yazmín De Los Reyes	"Volverte a Amar"	Team full	Team full	Team full	—
Episode 16 (Wednesday, July 21, 2021)	María José	8	"At Last"	Ale Soto	Rosy Vargas	"Mi soledad y yo"	Team full	Team full	Team full	✔
Episode 17 (Monday, July 26, 2021)	Edith Márquez	1	"Si voy a perderte"	Carolina Velez	Lau Larenas	"Usted Se Me Llevó La Vida"	Team full	Team full	Team full	Team full
Episode 17 (Monday, July 26, 2021)	Edith Márquez	1	"Si voy a perderte"	Carolina Velez	Liz Saenger	"Cuidado"	Team full	Team full	Team full	Team full
Episode 17 (Monday, July 26, 2021)	Miguel Bosé	2	"Watermelon Sugar"	Mike Soto	Still Music	"Imposible"	Team full	Team full	Team full	Team full
Episode 17 (Monday, July 26, 2021)	Miguel Bosé	2	"Watermelon Sugar"	Mike Soto	Jaime Aziel	"Tan Sólo un Minuto"	Team full	Team full	Team full	Team full
Episode 17 (Monday, July 26, 2021)	Jesús Navarro	3	"Help!"	Rogelio Edel	Patricio Loustalot	"Siempre Te Amaré"	Team full	Team full	Team full	Team full
Episode 17 (Monday, July 26, 2021)	Jesús Navarro	3	"Help!"	Rogelio Edel	Rafael Castañón	—N/a	Team full	Team full	Team full	Team full
Episode 17 (Monday, July 26, 2021)	María José	4	"Lo siento, mi amor"	Fátima Aragón	Guillermo Camargo	"Márchate"	Team full	Team full	Team full	Team full
Episode 17 (Monday, July 26, 2021)	María José	4	"Lo siento, mi amor"	Fátima Aragón	Becky Lanz	"Hagamos un trato"	Team full	Team full	Team full	Team full
Episode 17 (Monday, July 26, 2021)	Edith Márquez	5	"Quiero Perderme en Tu Cuerpo"	Salvador Arreola	Diego Bazán	"Hay Otra en Tu Lugar"	Team full	Team full	Team full	Team full
Episode 17 (Monday, July 26, 2021)	Edith Márquez	5	"Quiero Perderme en Tu Cuerpo"	Salvador Arreola	Alex Migliolo	"Mi Vida Sabe a Ti"	Team full	Team full	Team full	Team full
Episode 17 (Monday, July 26, 2021)	Miguel Bosé	6	"Te Fuiste de Aquí"	Diego Meléndez	Moisés Solís	"Yo No Sé Mañana"	Team full	Team full	Team full	Team full
Episode 17 (Monday, July 26, 2021)	Miguel Bosé	6	"Te Fuiste de Aquí"	Diego Meléndez	Paco Padilla	"Dónde está el Amor"	Team full	Team full	Team full	Team full
Episode 17 (Monday, July 26, 2021)	Jesús Navarro	7	"I dont wanna be you anymore"	Channa	Juan Pablo	"Blinding Lights"	Team full	Team full	Team full	Team full
Episode 17 (Monday, July 26, 2021)	Jesús Navarro	7	"I dont wanna be you anymore"	Channa	Viridiana Siqueiros	"Tan Sólo Tú"	Team full	Team full	Team full	Team full
Episode 17 (Monday, July 26, 2021)	María José	8	"With Arms Wide Open"	Iván Tacher	Zayra Frausto	"Tu Muñeca"	Team full	Team full	Team full	Team full
Episode 17 (Monday, July 26, 2021)	María José	8	"With Arms Wide Open"	Iván Tacher	Jeff	"Soy tuyo"	Team full	Team full	Team full	Team full
Episode 17 (Monday, July 26, 2021)	Jesús Navarro	9	"Señora"	Alejandra Desimone	Desirée Hermed	"Como un títere"	Team full	Team full	Team full	Team full
Episode 17 (Monday, July 26, 2021)	Jesús Navarro	9	"Señora"	Alejandra Desimone	Paola Carlín	"Ain't No Way"	Team full	Team full	Team full	Team full

Non-competition performances
Order	Performers	Song
13.1	Miguel Bosé & María José	"Nena"
15.1	Jesús Navarro & Edith Márquez	"Voy a Olvidarte"
17.1	Reik	"Lo Intenté Todo"

== Battles ==
The battles round started July 27. In this round, coaches can steal two losing artists from other coaches. Contestants who win their battle or are stolen by another coach advance to the Top 3 round.

Battles color key
Artist won the Battle and advanced to the Top 3
Artist lost the Battle but was stolen by another coach and advanced to the Top 3
Artist lost the Battle and was eliminated

Episode	Coach	Order	Winner	Song	Loser	'Steal' result			
Episode	Coach	Order	Winner	Song	Loser	María José	Miguel	Edith	Jesús
Episode 18 (Tuesday, July 27, 2021)	María José	1	Melina	"No sé vivir si no es contigo"	Aby Espinosa	N/A	—	—	—
Episode 18 (Tuesday, July 27, 2021)	Edith Márquez	2	Dugali	"Si tú la quieres"	Melina Islas	—	—	N/A	—
Episode 18 (Tuesday, July 27, 2021)	Miguel Bosé	3	Mike Soto	"Lucky"	Jiry	—	N/A	—	—
Episode 18 (Tuesday, July 27, 2021)	Jesús Navarro	4	Ela	"Desconocidos"	Rogelio Edel	—	—	—	N/A
Episode 18 (Tuesday, July 27, 2021)	María José	5	Ale Soto	"Skyfall"	Vida	N/A	✔	✔	✔
Episode 18 (Tuesday, July 27, 2021)	Edith Márquez	6	Aly Castellón	"Solos"	Álvaro Bautista	—	—	N/A	—
Episode 18 (Tuesday, July 27, 2021)	María José	7	Lheo	"Traicionera"	Ana Red	N/A	—	—	—
Episode 18 (Tuesday, July 27, 2021)	Jesús Navarro	8	Rosy Vargas	"When We Were Young"	Arturo De La Fuente	✔	—	✔	N/A
Episode 18 (Tuesday, July 27, 2021)	Miguel Bosé	9	Carmen Malouf	"Rise Up"	Sumiko	—	N/A	✔	✔
Episode 18 (Tuesday, July 27, 2021)	Edith Márquez	10	Carolina Vélez	"Cosas del Amor"	Alejandra Quintero	—	—	N/A	—
Episode 19 (Wednesday, July 28, 2021)	Jesús Navarro	1	Lizzette Montserrat	"Contigo en la Distancia"	Annika Oviedo	—	—	—	N/A
Episode 19 (Wednesday, July 28, 2021)	Miguel Bosé	2	Enero del Moral	"Tiny Dancer"	Blu Regine	—	N/A	—	—
Episode 19 (Wednesday, July 28, 2021)	Edith Márquez	3	Salvador Arreola	"Rival"	Alejandro Zapata	—	—	N/A	—
Episode 19 (Wednesday, July 28, 2021)	María José	4	Lalo Fierros	"Qué sabe nadie"	Fátima Aragón	N/A	—	✔	—
Episode 19 (Wednesday, July 28, 2021)	Jesús Navarro	5	Carolina Núñez	"La Malagueña"	Jesús Cortés	—	—	—	N/A
Episode 19 (Wednesday, July 28, 2021)	Miguel Bosé	6	Edeer Velásquez	"Volcán"	Jorge Mascareño	—	N/A	—	—
Episode 19 (Wednesday, July 28, 2021)	Jesús Navarro	7	Jahaziel Meza	"Esta Noche"	Hugo Coronel	—	—	—	N/A
Episode 19 (Wednesday, July 28, 2021)	Edith Márquez	8	Azucena Del Toro	"Mentiras Piadosas"	Dan De Saturno	—	—	N/A	—
Episode 19 (Wednesday, July 28, 2021)	Miguel Bosé	9	Kike Aristi	"16"	Shankara	—	N/A	—	—
Episode 19 (Wednesday, July 28, 2021)	Edith Márquez	10	Sherlyn Sánchez	"Échame a mí la culpa"	Faa Espinoza	—	—	N/A	—
Episode 19 (Wednesday, July 28, 2021)	María José	11	Iván Tacher	"I Don't Wanna Miss a Thing"	Óscar Romo	N/A	—	—	✔
Episode 20 (Monday, August 2, 2021)	Jesús Navarro	1	Arantza	"Lo Que Son Las Cosas"	Alejandra Desimone	—	—	—	Team full
Episode 20 (Monday, August 2, 2021)	María José	2	Alan Ruíz	"Perdóname"	Dann Steel	N/A	—	—	Team full
Episode 20 (Monday, August 2, 2021)	Edith Márquez	3	María De Souza	"Donde Quiera Que Estés"	Soul FM	—	—	N/A	Team full
Episode 20 (Monday, August 2, 2021)	Miguel Bosé	4	Brenda Santabalbina	"Te juro"	Diego Calderón	N/A	—	—	Team full
Episode 20 (Monday, August 2, 2021)	Jesús Navarro	5	Channa	"We Don't Talk Anymore"	Ricardo Bonilla	—	—	✔	Team full
Episode 20 (Monday, August 2, 2021)	María José	6	Amadeus Tijerina	"No Es Cierto"	Paulina Del Villar	N/A	—	Team full	Team full
Episode 20 (Monday, August 2, 2021)	Miguel Bosé	7	Emilio Aceves	"Sign of the Times"	Caozz	✔	N/A	Team full	Team full
Episode 20 (Monday, August 2, 2021)	Edith Márquez	8	Las Valencia	"Vamos a Darnos Tiempo"	Ángel Eduviel	Team full	—	Team full	Team full
Episode 20 (Monday, August 2, 2021)	María José	9	Dayma Diamante	"Mi caprichito"	Deyra Barrera	Team full	—	Team full	Team full
Episode 20 (Monday, August 2, 2021)	Miguel Bosé	10	Gloria	"¿Quieres ser Mi Amante?"	Diego Meléndez	Team full	N/A	Team full	Team full
Episode 20 (Monday, August 2, 2021)	Jesús Navarro	11	Mónica Garcés	"Ódiame"	Yoselin Marisol	Team full	✔	Team full	Team full

Non-competition performances
Order	Performers	Song
18.1	María José & Edith Márquez	"Derroche"
18.2	Miguel Bosé & Jesús Navarro	"Si Tú No Vuelves"
19.1	María José & Jesús Navarro	"Rosas en Mi Almohada"
20.1	Miguel Bosé & Edith Márquez	"Olvídame Tú"

== Top 3 ==
The Top 3 round started on August 3. After every performance, the artist's coach decides if the artist deserves a spot in the team's Top 3. If yes, the artist is given a chair by their coach. When all chairs are occupied the coach chooses an artist to seize his/her spot to the new artist and gets eliminated. Artists who are denied a chair by the coach are automatically eliminated. The Top 3 from each team advanced to the Semifinal.

Top 3 color key
✔	Artist was given a chair from his/her coach
✘	Artist was not given a chair by his/her coach, being automatically eliminated
	Artist was given a chair but later eliminated in favor of another artist
	Artist remained in a chair and advanced to the Semifinal

Episode	Coach	Order	Artist	Song	Chair	Artist Removed	Final Result
Episode 21 (Tuesday, August 3, 2021)	Edith Márquez	1	Salvador Arreola	"Almohada"	✔	—	Eliminated
Episode 21 (Tuesday, August 3, 2021)	Edith Márquez	2	Fátima Aragón	"En cambio no"	✔	—	Eliminated
Episode 21 (Tuesday, August 3, 2021)	Edith Márquez	3	Azucena Del Toro	"Livin' on a Prayer"	✔	—	Advanced
Episode 21 (Tuesday, August 3, 2021)	Edith Márquez	4	Aly Castellón	"Ya Lo Sé"	✔	Salvador Arreola	Eliminated
Episode 21 (Tuesday, August 3, 2021)	Miguel Bosé	5	Mike Soto	"Cake by the Ocean"	✔	—	Eliminated
Episode 21 (Tuesday, August 3, 2021)	Miguel Bosé	6	Carmen Malouf	"Si nos dejan"	✔	—	Eliminated
Episode 21 (Tuesday, August 3, 2021)	Miguel Bosé	7	Emilio Aceves	"Iris"	✔	—	Eliminated
Episode 21 (Tuesday, August 3, 2021)	Miguel Bosé	8	Edeer Velásquez	"Te quiero, te quiero"	✔	Carmen Malouf	Advanced
Episode 21 (Tuesday, August 3, 2021)	Jesús Navarro	9	Rosy Vargas	"Héroe"	✔	—	Eliminated
Episode 21 (Tuesday, August 3, 2021)	Jesús Navarro	10	Carolina Núñez	"Lágrimas negras"	✔	—	Eliminated
Episode 21 (Tuesday, August 3, 2021)	Jesús Navarro	11	Óscar Romo	"Impossible"	✔	—	Eliminated
Episode 21 (Tuesday, August 3, 2021)	Jesús Navarro	12	Channa	"Mediocre"	✔	Rosy Vargas	Eliminated
Episode 21 (Tuesday, August 3, 2021)	María José	13	Melina	"Remember"	✔	—	Advanced
Episode 21 (Tuesday, August 3, 2021)	María José	14	Lalo Fierros	"Ayer"	✔	—	Eliminated
Episode 21 (Tuesday, August 3, 2021)	María José	15	Amadeus Tijerina	"Te Besé"	✔	—	Eliminated
Episode 21 (Tuesday, August 3, 2021)	María José	16	Dayma Diamante	"Cuando vuelva a tu lado"	✘	—	Eliminated
Episode 22 (Wednesday, August 4, 2021)	Miguel Bosé	1	Brenda Santabalbina	"Entre tú y mil mares"	✘	—	Eliminated
Episode 22 (Wednesday, August 4, 2021)	Miguel Bosé	2	Kike Aristi	"Are You Gonna Be My Girl"	✔	Mike Soto	Advanced
Episode 22 (Wednesday, August 4, 2021)	Miguel Bosé	3	Yoselin Marisol	"Ese hombre"	✘	—	Eliminated
Episode 22 (Wednesday, August 4, 2021)	Edith Márquez	4	Carolina Vélez	"Como la Flor"	✘	—	Eliminated
Episode 22 (Wednesday, August 4, 2021)	Edith Márquez	5	Las Valencia	"Puño De Diamantes"	✔	Fátima Aragón	Eliminated
Episode 22 (Wednesday, August 4, 2021)	Edith Márquez	6	Ricardo Bonilla	"Toxic"	✔	Las Valencia	Eliminated
Episode 22 (Wednesday, August 4, 2021)	María José	7	Iván Tacher	"En la Ciudad de la Furia"	✔	Amadeus Tijerina	Eliminated
Episode 22 (Wednesday, August 4, 2021)	María José	8	Alan Ruíz	"Bésame"	✔	Iván Tacher	Eliminated
Episode 22 (Wednesday, August 4, 2021)	María José	9	Caozz	"Roadhouse Blues"	✘	—	Eliminated
Episode 22 (Wednesday, August 4, 2021)	Jesús Navarro	10	Lizzette Monserrat	"Love on the Brain"	✘	—	Eliminated
Episode 22 (Wednesday, August 4, 2021)	Jesús Navarro	11	Mónica	"Déjenme Si Estoy Llorando"	✔	Carolina Núñez	Eliminated
Episode 22 (Wednesday, August 4, 2021)	Jesús Navarro	12	Arantza	"Hurt"	✔	Channa	Advanced
Episode 23 (Monday, August 9, 2021)	Edith Márquez	1	Sherlyn Sánchez	"Yo no creo en los hombres"	✔	Ricardo Bonilla	Advanced
Episode 23 (Monday, August 9, 2021)	Edith Márquez	2	María De Souza	"Quiero Amanecer con Alguien"	✘	—	Eliminated
Episode 23 (Monday, August 9, 2021)	Edith Márquez	3	Dugali	"Drag Me Down"	✔	Aly Castellón	Advanced
Episode 23 (Monday, August 9, 2021)	María José	4	Ale Soto	"Baby, I Love You"	✔	Alan Ruíz	Advanced
Episode 23 (Monday, August 9, 2021)	María José	5	Lheo	"Tan Enamorados"	✔	Lalo Fierros	Eliminated
Episode 23 (Monday, August 9, 2021)	María José	6	Arturo De La Fuente	"Open Arms"	✔	Lheo	Advanced
Episode 23 (Monday, August 9, 2021)	Jesús Navarro	7	Jahaziel Meza	"Háblame de ti"	✘	—	Eliminated
Episode 23 (Monday, August 9, 2021)	Jesús Navarro	8	Ela	"Dos Extraños"	✔	Mónica	Advanced
Episode 23 (Monday, August 9, 2021)	Jesús Navarro	9	Sumiko	"I Will Always Love You"	✔	Óscar Romo	Advanced
Episode 23 (Monday, August 9, 2021)	Miguel Bosé	10	Enero Del Moral	"Se nos rompió el amor"	✔	Emilio Aceves	Eliminated
Episode 23 (Monday, August 9, 2021)	Miguel Bosé	11	Vida	"Por Siempre Tú"	✔	Enero Del Moral	Advanced
Episode 23 (Monday, August 9, 2021)	Miguel Bosé	12	Gloria	"Here I Go Again"	✘	—	Eliminated

Non-competition performances
Order	Performers	Song
21.1	Miguel Bosé & María José	"Amiga"
22.1	Miguel Bosé & Edith Márquez	"Duende"
23.1	Miguel Bosé & Jesús Navarro	"Bambú"

== Final phase ==
Final phase color key
Artist was saved by his/her coach
Artist was eliminated

=== Day 1: Semifinal (August 10) ===
In the Semifinal, the twelve remaining participants performed in order to become one of their coach's choice to advance into the Finale. Each coach advanced with two artists, with the third member being eliminated.

Episode 24
Order	Coach	Artist	Song	Result
1	Jesús Navarro	Ela	"Nunca Voy a Olvidarte"	Eliminated
2	Edith Márquez	Sherlyn Sánchez	"Besos Y Copas"	Edith's choice
3	Miguel Bosé	Kike Aristi	"(Everything I Do) I Do It for You"	Miguel's choice
4	María José	Melina	"Va todo al ganador"	Eliminated
5	Jesús Navarro	Arantza	"Un-Break My Heart"	Jesús' choice
6	Edith Márquez	Dugali	"De Vuelta Pa' La Vuelta"	Eliminated
7	Miguel Bosé	Edeer Velásquez	"A Gritos De Esperanza"	Eliminated
8	María José	Ale Soto	"Rehab"	María's choice
9	Jesús Navarro	Sumiko	"Beautiful"	Jesús' choice
10	Edith Márquez	Azucena Del Toro	"Habla El Corazón"	Edith's choice
11	Miguel Bosé	Vida	"Something"	Miguel's choice
12	María José	Arturo De La Fuente	"Sola Otra Vez"	María's choice

Non-competition performances
Order	Performers	Song
24.1	Mœnia	"¿En Qué Momento?"
24.2	Río Roma	"Contigo" / "No Lo Beses" / "Tú Eres Mi Amor"
24.3	Ana Torroja	"Me Cuesta Tanto Olvidarte"

=== Day 2: Finale (August 11) ===
The Finale was prerecorded, due to the ongoing COVID-19 pandemic. In the first round, the participants sang a solo song. Following those performances, each coach had to choose one artist to advance to the second round. In the second round, the four finalists performed their song from the Blind auditions. The show's production shot four different winning results (one per finalist), but only the chosen winner by the public at home one was shown on TV.

==== First round ====
Episode 25
Order	Coach	Artist	Song	Result
1	María José	Ale Soto	"No Tengo Nada"	Eliminated
2	María José	Arturo De La Fuente	"When a Man Loves a Woman"	María's choice
3	Miguel Bosé	Kike Aristi	"Ángel"	Miguel's choice
4	Miguel Bosé	Vida	"Quédate conmigo"	Eliminated
5	Edith Márquez	Azucena Del Toro	"Cómo Sufro"	Eliminated
6	Edith Márquez	Sherlyn Sánchez	"El Toro Relajo"	Edith's choice
7	Jesús Navarro	Sumiko	"The Power of Love"	Eliminated
8	Jesús Navarro	Arantza	"And I Am Telling You"	Jesús' choice

Non-competition performances
Order	Performers	Song
25.1	María José & her team (Arturo & Ale)	"Stand by Me"
25.2	Miguel Bosé & his team (Kike & Vida)	"Los chicos no lloran"
25.3	Edith Márquez & her team (Sherlyn & Azucena)	"Dejémoslo Así"
25.4	Jesús Navarro & his team (Arantza & Sumiko)	"Adicto A Ti"
25.5	María José & Mœnia	"No Importa Que El Sol Se Muera"
25.6	Reik	"Amigos con derechos"
25.7	Edith Márquez & Río Roma	"Ese Beso" / "Todavía No Te Olvido"
25.8	Miguel Bosé & Ana Torroja	"Corazones"

==== Second round ====
Order	Coach	Artist	Song	Result
1	María José	Arturo De La Fuente	"When I Was Your Man"	Runner-up
2	Miguel Bosé	Kike Aristi	"Always"	Fourth place
3	Edith Márquez	Sherlyn Sánchez	"Culpable o inocente"	Winner
4	Jesús Navarro	Arantza	"Man in the Mirror"	Third place

== Elimination chart ==
=== Color key ===
Artist's info

- Team María José
- Team Miguel
- Team Edith
- Team Jesús

Result details

- Winner
- Runner-up
- Third place
- Fourth place
- Saved by his/her coach
- Eliminated

Final phase results per week
Artists	Semifinal	Finale	
Artists	Semifinal	Round 1	Round 2
Sherlyn Sánchez	Safe	Safe	Winner
Arturo De La Fuente	Safe	Safe	Runner-up
Arantza	Safe	Safe	Third place
Kike Aristi	Safe	Safe	Fourth place
Ale Soto	Safe	Eliminated	Eliminated (Finale)
Azucena Del Toro	Safe	Eliminated	Eliminated (Finale)
Sumiko	Safe	Eliminated	Eliminated (Finale)
Vida	Safe	Eliminated	Eliminated (Finale)
Dugali	Eliminated	Eliminated (Semifinal)	
Edeer Velásquez	Eliminated	Eliminated (Semifinal)	
Ela	Eliminated	Eliminated (Semifinal)	
Melina	Eliminated	Eliminated (Semifinal)	

== Ratings ==
Show	Episode	Air date	Timeslot (CT)	Viewers (millions)
1	"Blind Auditions, Part 1"	June 1, 2021	Tuesday 7:30 p.m.	1.4
2	"Blind Auditions, Part 2"	June 7, 2021	Monday 7:30 p.m.	1.2
3	"Blind Auditions, Part 3"	June 8, 2021	Tuesday 7:30 p.m.	1.2
4	"Blind Auditions, Part 4"	June 14, 2021	Monday 7:30 p.m.	1.3
5	"Blind Auditions, Part 5"	June 15, 2021	Tuesday 7:30 p.m.	1.0
6	"Blind Auditions, Part 6"	June 21, 2021	Monday 7:30 p.m.	1.1
7	"Blind Auditions, Part 7"	June 22, 2021	Tuesday 7:30 p.m.	1.2
8	"Blind Auditions, Part 8"	June 28, 2021	Monday 7:30 p.m.	1.1
9	"Blind Auditions, Part 9"	June 29, 2021	Tuesday 7:30 p.m.	1.1
10	"Blind Auditions, Part 10"	July 5, 2021	Monday 7:30 p.m.	1.2
11	"Blind Auditions, Part 11"	July 6, 2021	Tuesday 7:30 p.m.	1.1
12	"The Knockouts, Part 1"	July 12, 2021	Monday 7:30 p.m.	0.9
13	"The Knockouts, Part 2"	July 13, 2021	Tuesday 7:30 p.m.	1.1
14	"The Knockouts, Part 3"	July 19, 2021	Monday 7:30 p.m.	1.0
15	"The Knockouts, Part 4"	July 20, 2021	Tuesday 7:30 p.m.	1.1
16	"The Knockouts, Part 5"	July 21, 2021	Wednesday 7:30 p.m.	1.0
17	"The Knockouts, Part 6"	July 26, 2021	Monday 7:30 p.m.	1.0
18	"The Battles, Part 1"	July 27, 2021	Tuesday 7:30 p.m.	0.9
19	"The Battles, Part 2"	July 28, 2021	Wednesday 7:30 p.m.	1.1
20	"The Battles, Part 3"	August 2, 2021	Monday 7:30 p.m.	1.0
21	"Top 3, Part 1"	August 3, 2021	Tuesday 7:30 p.m.	1.0
22	"Top 3, Part 2"	August 4, 2021	Wednesday 7:30 p.m.	1.0
23	"Top 3, Part 3"	August 9, 2021	Monday 7:30 p.m.	1.2
24	"Semifinal"	August 10, 2021	Tuesday 7:30 p.m.	1.1
25	"Finale"	August 11, 2021	Wednesday 7:30 p.m.	1.3

== Artists who appeared on other shows or in previous seasons ==
- Deyra Barrera participanted in the eighth season of La Academia, where she was 14th place.
- Dugali participated in the first season, where they was part of Team Alejandro Sanz.
- Aby Espinosa participated in season three, where she was a semi-finalist of Team Wisin & Yandel.
- Francisco Treviño participated in season seven, where he was a semi-finalist of Team Maluma.
- Irenka Moro participated in the first season of La Voz Kids, where she was part of Team Maluma.
- Ari Benedik & Tony Rosher, each participanted separately in season nine. They became a duo for this season's participation.
- Enero del Moral participated in season seven, where he did not turn any chair.
- Amadeus Tijerina and Annika Oviedo participated in the first season of La Voz Kids, both of them part of Team Rosario Flores.
- Emilio Aceves participated in season four, where he was part of Team Laura Pausini.
