= Conexión (María José album) =

Live album by Maria José
- Released: June 7, 2019
- Recorded: 2019
- Studio: Estudios Churubusco, Mexico
- Genre: Latin; pop
- Language: Spanish
- Label: OCESA Seitrack

Maria José chronology
Habla Ahora (2016)	Conexión (2019)	Libertad (2023)

Singles from Conexión
- 1. "Hábito de Ti" Released: January 25, 2019; 2. "Un Nuevo Amor" Released: April 5, 2019; 3. "Derroche" Released: April 26, 2019; 4. "Lo Que Tenías Conmigo" Released: May 10, 2019; 5. "Rosas en Mi Almohada" Released: January 20, 2020; 6. "Ya No Me Acuerdo Más de Ti" Released: February 19,2021

Conexión is the first live album by the Mexican singer-songwriter María José. It was recorded in front of a selected audience to attend the concert located in Mexico City. In celebration of the tenth anniversary of her breakout album Amante de lo Ajeno, the album celebrates José's trajectory as a solo artist. The album includes material from her previous five studio albums as well as eight newly recorded songs. Featured guest include Ha*Ash, Yuri, Carlos Rivera and Vanesa Martin.

== Promotion ==
=== Singles ===
Four singles have been released in support of the album. "Hábito de Ti" was released on January 25, 2019, as the lead single. The song features the Spanish singer Vanessa Martin who originally wrote the song for herself. José approached the singer wanting to collaborate on a song, Martin agreed and told her she could pick from a handful of songs the singer had written. José chose "Hábito de Ti" as she felt a connection with the song. "Un Nuevo Amor", which had previously been released as a single from her third album Amante de lo Bueno, was re-released as the album's second digital single on April 15, 2019. "Derroche" was released as the album's third single on April 26, 2019. "Lo Que Tenías Conmigo" was released on May 5, 2019, as the second radio single and fourth overall.

=== Promotional singles ===
On August 14, 2019, it was revealed hat "El Era Perfecto", the album's first promotional single and fifth overall from the album, was expected to be released on August 16, 2019. "Rosas en Mi Almohada" featuring Ha*Ash, was released on January 27, 2020, as the second promotional single.

== Track listing ==
All tracks are produced solely by Armando Ávila.

Conexión
No.	Title	Writer(s)	Length
1.	"Preludio"	Armando Ávila	2:01
2.	"Un Nuevo Amor"	Douglas Bastidas	4:13
3.	"Él Era Perfecto"	Paty Cantú, Ángela Dávalos	3:46
4.	"Tú Ya Sabes a Mí"	José Luis Ortega, Raúl Ortega	3:49
5.	"Rosas en Mi Almohada" (with Ha*Ash)	Ashley Grace, Hanna Nicole, Kany García	3:25
6.	"Me Equivoqué"	Tobías Gad, Toodeshki Djafari, Carla García	4:20
7.	"El Amor Manda"	J.L Ortega	3:50
8.	"Hábito de Ti" (with Vanesa Martin)	Vanesa Martin	4:03
9.	"Evidencias"	María Araujo, Paulo Valle, Augusto Cougil	3:54
10.	"Solo El Amor Lastima Así"	Diane Eve Warren	3:54
11.	"Adelante Corazón" (with Yuri)	Daniela Romo, Marella Cayre, Teresa Presmanes Corona	3:57
12.	"Lo Que Tenías Conmigo"	Moguel Jc, Ignacio Morales, Carolina Rosas	3:55
13.	"Ya No Me Acuerdo Más de Ti" (with Carlos Rivera)	Pablo Preciado	3:43
14.	"Derroche"	Manuel Jesus de Jimenez	3:50
15.	"Las Que Se Ponen Bien La Falda"	Andrés Saavedra, Rafael Esparza, Yoel Henríquez, Martha Pesante	3:51
16.	"La Ocasión Para Amarnos"	Luisa Fatello, Teresa Presmanes, Rosalba Gigo, Paola Casiraghi	3:45
17.	"Prefiero Ser Su Amante"	Cantú, Dávalos	3:34
18.	"No Soy Una Señora"	Jaime Compaire, Ivano Fossati	5:11

== Certifications ==
Region	Certification	Certified units/sales
Mexico (AMPROFON)	Gold	30,000^{^}
^{^} Shipments figures based on certification alone.

== Release history ==
Region	Date	Format	Label(s)	Ref
México	June 7, 2019	CD/DVD	OCESA Seitrack	
Various	June 7, 2019	CD/DVD	OCESA Seitrack	
