= Que Se Jodan =

Single by Ivy Queen

from the album The Queen Is Here
- Released: 13 May 2016
- Recorded: 2016
- Genre: Latin trap
- Length: 3:04
- Label: InnerCat Music Group, Ivy Queen Musa Sound Corp
- Songwriters: Martha Pesante, Jorge Guadalupe

Ivy Queen singles chronology
"Las Que Se Ponen Bien La Falda" (2016)	"Que Se Jodan" (2016)	"Ámame o Mátame" (2016)

"Que Se Jodan" (English: Fuck Them) is a song by Puerto Rican reggaetón recording artist Ivy Queen. It was composed by Queen

== Background ==
It was announced in September 2013, that Queen had changed management and returned with Jorge "Goguito" Guadalupe, president and co-founder of Filtro Musik, to release her ninth studio album, entitled Vendetta. Following the birth of her first biological child, Queen then announced that she would embark on a U.S. tour entitled the "Viva Puerto Rico Tour". The tour, launched on 29 January 2014, included performances at various gay clubs in cities of the United States and Puerto Rico, such as New York, Orlando, Miami, Houston, Seattle, San Francisco, San Diego, Atlanta, Sacramento, Los Angeles, Tampa, and Ponce. The studio album version was originally announced for a release in February 2014, and later some time in 2014.

== Writing and composition ==
The song was composed in minor key tonality with the use of vocal call and response. It features simple harmonic progressions, synthetic instrumentation, stick-drum percussion and mallet percussion. Lyrically, it features catchy hooks as well as offensive lyrics. According to the Spanish language newspaper Hola Ciudad!, the song is a "clear message against men". A poll of 649 people by the Spanish language newspaper Primera Hora, determined that fifty-three percent of those polled did not like the new song, while forty-seven percent did.

== Release ==
The song was released digitally on 13 May 2016. It was released with a parental advisory for explicit lyrics. The song was released simultaneously with "Las Que Se Ponen Bien La Falda," a duet with Mexican singer Maria Jose. An official lyric video of the song was released on 20 April 2016, featuring a two-minute and twenty-six second snippet of the song. An official artwork video for the song was released to coincide with the official digital release of "Que Se Jodan". The official music video was released two days later, on 15 May 2016. The lyric video was directed by Victor Reyes and Team Tiger. The music video was directed by Florida Film House.

== Release history ==
List of release dates, showing regions, formats and labels
Country	Date	Format	Label
United States	13 May 2016	Digital download	InnerCat Music Group, Ivy Queen Musa Sound
