= María José (album) =

Studio album by María José
- Released: April 2, 2007
- Genre: Dance-pop, R&B, Latin pop, electroacoustic, electropop
- Length: 47:46
- Label: Warner Music
- Producer: Aureo Baquero

María José chronology
María José (2007)	Amante de lo Ajeno (2009)

Singles from Conexión
- 1. "¿Quién Eres Tú?" Released: March 5, 2007; 2. "Me Equivoqué" Released: 2007; 3. "¿Donde Esta?" Released: 2008

María José is the debut solo album by Mexican pop singer María José. Released in 2007, the album is her first solo attempt after the split of the successful pop group Kabah.

== Track listing ==
#	Title	Length
01.	"Más de Ti" • Music & Lyric: Aureo Baqueiro	4:06
02.	"¿Quién Eres Tú? (Feat. Trey Songz)" • Music & Lyric: Aureo Baqueiro	3:49
03.	"Ya Te Dije Adiós (Feat. Golden Boy)" • Music & Lyric: Aureo Baqueiro & Salvador Rizo	3:11
04.	"¿Dónde Está?" • Music & Lyric: Aureo Baqueiro & Salvador Rizo	4:07
05.	"Detrás De Tus Palabras" • Music & Lyric: Aureo Baqueiro & Salvador Rizo	4:05
06.	"No Soy Yo (Feat. Blu From Sergio O'Farrill)" • Music & Lyric: Aureo Baqueiro, Sergio O'Farrill & Fitte	3:43
07.	"Me Equivoqué" • Music & Lyric: Fitte	3:59
08.	"Habla Menos" • Music & Lyric: Aureo Baqueiro	3:21
09.	"It's A Party (Feat. Plastillina Mosh)" • Music & Lyric: Aureo Baqueiro & Jonaz González	3:42
10.	"Quédate Cerca" • Music & Lyric: Aureo Baqueiro	4:43
11.	"¿Quién Eres Tú? (Feat. Trey Songz)" • Reworked Version by Plinio Profeta	4:26
12.	"Más De Ti" • Reworked Version by Plinio Profeta	3:42
13.	"¿Quién eres Tú? (Feat. Trey Songz)" • Remix by The IN. Crowd	4:52

== Singles ==
- ¿Quien Eres Tú? (2007)
- Me Equivoque (2007)
- ¿Donde Está? (2008)

== Charts ==
Chart (2009)	Peak Position
Mexican Albums (Top 100 Mexico)	84

== Certifications and sales ==
Region	Certification	Certified units/sales
Central America (CFC)	Gold	5,000
Mexico (AMPROFON)	Gold	50,000^{^}
^{^} Shipments figures based on certification alone.
