= La Calle de las Sirenas =

Studio album by Kabah
- Released: April 16, 1996
- Recorded: 1995–1996
- Genre: Pop
- Length: 45:59
- Label: PolyGram

Kabah chronology
Kabah (1994)	La Calle de las Sirenas (1996)	Esperanto (1998)

Singles from La Calle de las Sirenas
- 1. "Fuego de Gloria" Released: June 1996 (re-released early 1998); 2. "La Calle de las Sirenas" Released: September 1996; 3. "Vive" Released: November 1996; 4. "Estaré" Released: January 1997; 5. "Juntos" Released: April 1997; 6. "Amor Por Amor" Released: April 1997; 7. "Amor de Estudiante" Released: July 1997

La Calle de las Sirenas (The Street of the Sirens) is the second studio album by Mexican pop group, Kabah and their most successful album to date. It was released in 1996. Most of the songs were written by the band members and Fitte, their personal manager, the album went straight to number one in Mexico and Argentina.

"La Calle de las Sirenas", was the lead single of the album, which was released in the spring of 1996 and peaked 10 consecutive weeks at the number one position on the Mexican Top 40 Charts, it also provided to the band their breakout single all around Hispanic-America; it also was Top 10 in Japan. It was the second biggest hit of the year in Mexico only behind of the smash teen-pop hit Azúcar amargo by Fey.

Then came in the same 1996 with the second single, "Vive" while "Fuego de Gloria" was used as Televisa's theme of the 1996 Summer Olympic Games. Despite this, it wasn't included on the Voces Unidas soundtrack album to the 1996 Summer Olympics. It was however, released as the seventh and final single in early 1998.

Their fourth single "Estaré" was released in December 1996 and the music video was made in 1997, it also peaked at number one in Mexico and their fifth single "Amor de Estudiante" was released in January 1997, and became another number one hit for the band, which served as the main theme of the soap opera Mi Generación in that year; other singles included "Amor por Amor" and "Juntos". The members' look for this album was full of colors and energy directed.

Tracklist:

1. La Calle De Las Sirenas
2. Amor Por Amor
3. Vivir
4. Siempre Hay Una Solución
5. Vive
6. Sin Ti Yo No
7. Júntos
8. Fuego De Gloria
9. Estaré
10. Amor, Paz Y Enténdimiento
11. Tú Risa Genial
12. Amor De Estudiante (Amor de Verano)
