= Las Que Se Ponen Bien La Falda =

Single by María José featuring Ivy Queen

from the album Habla Ahora
- Released: 9 May 2016
- Recorded: 2016
- Genre: Reggaetón, Latin pop
- Length: 3:44
- Label: OCESA Seitrack
- Songwriters: Rafael Esparza, Yoel Henriquez, Jorge Guadalupe, Martha Pesante, Andres Saavedra
- Producer: Elliot "El Mago De Oz"

María José singles chronology
"Diablo" (2015)	"Las Que Se Ponen Bien La Falda" (2016)	"Habla Ahora" (2016)

Ivy Queen singles chronology
"Vendetta" (2015)	"Las Que Se Ponen Bien La Falda" (2016)	"Que Se Jodan" (2016)

"Las Que Se Ponen Bien La Falda", also known as "#LQSPBLF", is a song by Mexican recording artist María José, from her fifth studio album, Habla Ahora (2016). The song features vocals performed by Puerto Rican recording artist Ivy Queen. It was released to radio as the lead single from the album on 9 May 2016 and as a digital download on 13 May 2016. A music video for the song was recorded in Miami in April 2016.

Musically, the song ventures into the genres of reggaeton and urban music, while the lyrics speak of female empowerment and gender violence. The song was met with generally favorable criticism, with critics complementing both the collaboration of the two artists and their lyricism. Upon release, the song debuted at number five in Mexico, with an audience impression of fifteen million. In the United States, the song peaked at number twenty-nine on the Billboard Tropical Songs chart.

A remixed version of the song was released on the album featuring new lyrics by both José and Queen.

== Background ==
In 2012, José released her fourth studio album, De Noche, which was very successful. "Tú Ya Sabes A Mí" served as the lead single for the album. In 2014, José became impregnated by her husband, later taking hiatus from her musical career to focus on her baby. In 2015, José embarked on a tour with OV7 and Kabah. Following the split between her and the two groups, she then began recording material for her future studio project.

== Release and promotion ==
At a presentation in Hermosillo, Mexico, she announced the release of the song. José premiered snippets of the song on her social networks in April 2016. On 30 April 2016, a preview of the song was posted on José's official YouTube and VEVO accounts. "Las Que Se Ponen Bien La Falda" was released as the lead single from José's upcoming untitled fifth studio album. It was sent to radio on 9 May 2016. The same day, a lyric video for the song was uploaded on José's official YouTube account. The album will be promoted by a tour in August 2016, with the album following in September 2016.

== Music and lyrics ==
Musically, José ventures into the genre of reggaetón and urban music on "Las Que Se Ponen Bien La Falda". According to Lena Hensen from People En Español, the chemistry between the two artists can be felt on the song. Univision claimed the song to be an "explosive collaboration". Lyrically, the song defends, and brings empowerment to women. According to an editor for the Mexican journal El Imparcial, the song "responds to all the criticism that has been made in relation to gender violence. José claimed the genres of reggaeton and urban music to be genres where the artists portray females negatively, reaffirming that in all cases, this was not true. The Mexican newspaper La Verdad de Tamaulipas stated that the song did not speak bad about men, "however reaffirmed the power of the female gender, which has been discriminated against throughout history".

== Music video ==
The music video for the song was filmed in Miami, and was filmed over two days on 13 and 14 April 2016. The music video was released via José's social networks on 19 May 2016. It was directed by Pablo Croce. It premiered exclusively on "Al Rojo Vivo con María Celeste" and was later presented on the Telemundo programs "El Nuevo Día," "Suelta La Sopa," "Titulares y Más" and "Acceso Total". NBC Universo also premiered the video on their channel as well. It was posted to José's official VEVO account on 21 May 2016, having acquired over seventy-six million views as of February 2020. It was released on iTunes on 27 May 2016. According to Univision, the music video "promises to give something to talk about". The music video for the song made the top ten on Ritmoson Latino, the Mexico-based pan-Spanish American music video channel.

== Chart performance ==
Upon its release, the song debuted at number five on the Mexico Pop chart, with an estimated audience impression of fifteen million. In its second week, the song fell to number twelve on the chart, with an audience impression of twelve million. The song rose four positions to number eight, in its third week on the chart, with an audience impression of fourteen million. For the week of 4 June 2016, the song debuted at number thirty-three on the Billboard Mexico Español Airplay chart. In its second week on the chart, the song rose twenty-seven positions to number six. In its sixth week on the chart, it rose one position to number five. For the week of 11 June 2016, the song debuted at number twenty-eight on the Billboard Tropical Airplay chart. On the Billboard Tropical Songs chart, the song debuted at number thirty-eight for the week of 11 June 2016. The following week of 18 June 2016, the song rose eight positions to number thirty. In its fourth week, it rose a position to number twenty-nine. In its seventh week, the song moved two positions to number twenty-seven.

== Track listing ==
No.	Title	Writer(s)	Producer(s)	Length
1.	"Las Que Se Ponen Bien La Falda" (Album Version)	Rafael Esparza, Yoel Henriquez, Jorge Guadalupe, Martha Pesante, Andres Saavedra	Elliot "El Mago de Oz"	3:45
2.	"Las Que Se Ponen Bien La Falda" (Pop Version)	Esparza, Henriquez, Guadalupe, Pesante, Saavedra	Áureo Baqueiro	3:58
Total length:				7:43

== Charts ==
Chart (2016)	Peak position
US Tropical Songs (Billboard)	27
US Mexico Airplay (Billboard)	23
US Mexico Espanol Airplay (Billboard)	5
Mexico Pop (Monitor Latino)	5

== Release history ==
List of release dates, showing regions, formats, labels and references
Country	Date	Format	Label
Mexico	9 May 2016	Radio airplay	OCESA Seitrack
United States	13 May 2016	Digital download	Seitrack US
