= Habla Ahora =

Album by María José Loyola Anaya

Studio album by María José
- Released: October 21, 2016
- Genre: Latin pop, pop
- Label: Sei Track Musica

María José chronology
De Noche (2012)	Habla Ahora (2016)	Conexión (2019)

Singles from Habla Ahora
- 1. "Las Qué Se Ponen Bien La Falda" Released: May 13, 2016; 2. "Habla Ahora" Released: September 9, 2016; 3. "Lo Que Te Mereces" Released: March 10, 2017; 4. "El Amor Coloca" Released: April 20, 2017; 5. "Duri Duri" Released: September 5, 2017

Habla Ahora is the fifth studio album by Mexican singer María José. The follow-up to De Noche, the album introduces new genres to the singer. The lead single "Las Que Se Ponen Bien La Falda" marks the first time the singer dwells into the genre of reggaeton and urban music, while the album's title track incorporates a bachata undertone. She also continues what now is known as one of her trademarks and includes two covers on the album. "Olvidame Y Pega la Vuelta" which features Bryan Amadeus is originally a song by Pimpinela, as well as "Duri Duri" which is original sung by 80's High Energy Mexican band Click.

On May 28, 2017, the album was re-released digitally as a special edition. It debuted at the fifth position on the Pop Albums in Spanish. The new edition features all 12 of the original track listing plus 3 new songs and a remix. The new material includes the songs "Ni me vas a Extrañar" (You won't even miss me), "Despertar" (Waking Up) as well as the fourth single off the album "El Amor Coloca" along with a remix version.

== Background ==
In 2012, José released her fourth studio album, De Noche, which was very successful. "Tú Ya Sabes A Mí" served as the lead single for the album. In 2014, José became impregnated by her husband, later taking hiatus from her musical career to focus on her baby. In 2015, José embarked on a tour with OV7 and Kabah. Following the split between her and the two groups, she then began recording material for her future studio project.

== Singles ==
- "Las Que Se Ponen Bien La Falda" was released as the lead single from the album. Debuting to radio and digital retailers on May 9, 2016, and features Puerto Rican singer Ivy Queen. José premiered snippets of the song on her social networks in April 2016. On 30 April 2016, a preview of the song was posted on José's official YouTube and VEVO accounts. Las Que Se Ponen Bien La Falda marks the first time for the singer to explore new genres into urban and reggaeton, a complete departure from her previous singles and material.
- "Habla Ahora", the album's title track, was released as the album's second single impacting radio on September 9, 2016. It also introduces Josa to new genres of music with the song incorporating Bachata undertones throughout the main chorus of the song.
- "Lo Que Te Mereces" was released on March 27, 2017 as the album's third single. The song was co-written by Mexican singer-songwriter Paty Cantú and marks the fourth time the two work together on a song, the past songs including "Prefiero Ser Su Amante" which was the third single from her past album De Noche.
- "El Amor Coloca" was released on April 20, 2017 as the lead single from the re-release of the album as well as the fourth single over all. Following her trademark, the song is a cover originally a song from Spanish singer Mónica Naranjo.
- ”Duri Duri” was released as the album's fifth single on September 7, 2017 same day as the premiere of its music video.

=== Promotional singles ===
Although not released as a single, "Olvídame Y Pega la Vuelta" received heavy rotation on Mexican radio due to the singer filming a music video for the song.

== Tour ==
María José embarked on the Lo Que Te Merces Tour in support of her fifth album Habla Ahora. Beginning in Mexico, the tour will also visit parts of the United States. The name is borrowed from the album's third single.

== Track listing ==
Habla Ahora
No.	Title	Length
1.	"Las Que Se Ponen Bien La Falda (featuring Ivy Queen)"	3:45
2.	"Lo Que Te Mereces"	4:10
3.	"Olvídame y Pega la Vuelta (featuring Bryan Amadeus)"	3:25
4.	"Cobarde"	3:25
5.	"Habla Ahora"	3:22
6.	"Quiero que te Quedes"	3:46
7.	"Nada Fue Verdad"	3:38
8.	"Duri Duri"	3:36
9.	"Ella Me Gusta para Ti"	3:09
10.	"No Soy (featuring Yuridia)"	3:16
11.	"Hombre Malvado"	2:34
12.	"Las Que Se Ponen Bien La Falda [Pop Version] (featuring Ivy Queen)"	3:58

Habla Ahora — Special Edition (Bonus tracks)
No.	Title	Length
13.	"Ni Me Vas a Extrañar"	2:55
14.	"Despertar"	3:35
15.	"El Amor Coloca"	3:24
16.	"El Amor Coloca (Remix)"	3:26
