= Sergio O'Farrill =

Mexican singer and actor (born 1979)

- Also known as: Blu
- Born: Sergio O'Farrill; February 7, 1979 (age 46)
- Origin: Mexico City, Mexico
- Genres: Latin pop; Acoustic
- Occupations: Singer; Actor
- Years active: 1992–present
- Labels: Unsigned
- Member of: Kabah

Sergio O'Farrill (born February 7, 1979) began his musical career at the age of 14 in Mexican pop group Kabah. He was one of the group's members to write and compose some of the group's singles and B-sides. Sergio started playing the guitar at age 9 when his father, Sergio Ortiz, gave him his first guitar. After Kabah disbanded in 2005 Sergio continued his music career with Moroccoblu, the name of his musical project as a solo artist. Kabah Made a comeback in 2014 with the OV7/Kabah Tour selling out over 25 concerts at Mexico's acclaimed Auditorio Nacional and were a part time of the 90s Pop tour. Sergio continues to explore his creative and artistic persona beginning a career as an actor.

== 1992-2005 ==
Sergio recorded seven albums with Kabah. The musical group formed in 1992 and disbanded in 2005, Kabah had a national and international success without precedents. In 1996 they reached worldwide acclamation with the single "La Calle de las Sirenas." and kept building their success until they disbanded in 2005.

== 2006–present ==
In April 2006, Moroccoblu had his first official solo presentation in Mexico City but was never signed to any label. Over the years he has collaborated in several tracks with fellow artists. In 2012 Sergio moved to Los Angeles, California where he worked on the production of several albums with acclaimed Mexican producer Aureo Baqueiro. He also studied acting, a career he is passionate about, specializing in movies and series.

== Discography ==
=== With Kabah ===
- El Pop ha muerto viva el pop (2006)- No. 11 (MX)
- El Pop (2005)- No. 2 (MX)
- La Vuelta Al Mundo (2003)- No. 10 (MX)
- La Vida Que Va (2002)- No. 1 (MX)
- XNE (2000)- No. 3 (MX)
- Esperanto (1998)- No. 1 (MX)
- La Calle de Las Sirenas (1996)- No. 1 (MX)
- Kabah (1994)

=== Solo albums ===
- Untitled Freshmen Album (Expected in 2009)
