= Amante de lo Ajeno =

Studio album by María José
- Released: May 12, 2009
- Recorded: 2008–2009
- Genre: Latin pop, pop
- Length: 40:21
- Label: Sei Track Musica
- Producer: Loris Ceroni

María José chronology
María José (2007)	Amante de lo Ajeno (2009)	Amante de lo Bueno (2010)

Special Edition cover

Singles from Amante de lo Ajeno
- 1. "No Soy Una Señora"; 2. "Mi Amor Amor"; 3. "Adelante Corazón"; 4. "Sola No, Yo No Se Estar"

Amante de lo Ajeno (English: Lover Of Other People's Things) is the second solo studio album by Mexican singer María José. The name is a play on words, as it is a cover album. It was released on 12 May 2009 on the Sei Track Musica label, a division of Grupo CIE, and reached number 2 in the Mexican album charts.

The album includes 11 tracks that are part of the Mexican musical memory, previously sung by "divas" and pop singers of the '80s. The aim was to pay homage to performers such as Manoella Torres, Daniela Romo, María Conchita Alonso, Lucía Méndez, Ana Gabriel, Jeanette, Vikki Carr, Fiordaliso, Loredana Bertè, Rocío Banquells, Crystal and Melissa. The album was recorded in Riolo Terme, Italy and produced by Loris Cerroni. No Soy Una Señora, originally sung by Melissa, is the first single from the album. José said it brought back memories: "For 9 years I sang in front of the mirror, I put on my 'Walkman', grabbed my deodorant and sang."

The album has been promoted on Mexican national radio and in TV interviews, and José has performed the single No Soy Una Señora at many events. A year after the original release of the album, Amante de lo Ajeno was re-released as a special edition that included 2 newly recorded covers plus a DVD that featured a concert.

== Track listing ==
#	Title	Length
01.	"Adelante Corazón" • Music & Lyric: Difelisatti / Daniela Romo	3:59
02.	"Acariciame" • Music & Lyric: Juan Carlos Calderón	3:42
03.	"No Soy Una Señora" • Music & Lyric: Ivano Fossati/ Peter Daniél	3:24
04.	"Y Aquí Estoy" • Music & Lyric: Ana Gabriel	3:52
05.	"Mi Amor, Amor" • Music & Lyric: Honorio / Herrero	3:38
06.	"Cosas del Amor" • Music & Lyric: Roberto Livi / Rudy Pérez	4:05
07.	"Sola No, yo no sé Estar" • Music & Lyric: Luigi Albertelli / Vincenzo Malepasso	3:39
08.	"Este Hombre no se Toca" • Music & Lyric: Difelissati/ J.R. Flores	3:58
09.	"Herida de Muerte" • Music & Lyric: Amparo Rubín	3:06
10.	"Frente a Frente" • Music & Lyric: Manuel Alejandro / Ana Magdalena	3:29
11.	"No Me Pregunten Por él" • Music & Lyric: Sergio Andrade	3:44

Special Edition bonus tracks
No.	Title	Length
12.	"En Mi Soledad • Music & Lyric: Marco Flores"	3:30
13.	"Quiereme Mas • Music & Lyric: Denisse De Kalaffe"	3:07

Special Edition bonus DVD: María José en Concierto
No.	Title	Length
1.	"Sola No, Yo No Se Estar"
2.	"Este Hombre No Se Toca"
3.	"Acariciame"
4.	"En Mi Soledad"
5.	"No Me Pregunten por El"
6.	"Adelante Corazon"
7.	"Herida de Muerte"
8.	"Quiereme Mas"
9.	"Frente A Frente"
10.	"Y Aqui Estoy"
11.	"Mi Amor, Amor"
12.	"No Soy Una Señora"

The album has been certified Gold in Mexico for its 50,000 copies in just 8 weeks on the chart. The album recently has been certified Platinum in Mexico for over 100,000 copies sold in the 30 week on the Mexican Album Chart. Later a year in April the album was certified 2xPlatinum for 180,000 sold in Mexico.

== Charts ==
Chart (2009)	Peak position
Mexican Albums (Top 100 Mexico)	1

== Certifications ==
Region	Certification	Certified units/sales
Mexico (AMPROFON)	2× Platinum	120,000^{^}
^{^} Shipments figures based on certification alone.
