= Team Tiger =

American health organization

Team Tiger is an Atlanta-based certified 501(c)3 organization whose mission is to help kids and families fight childhood obesity. The organization provides the resources, opportunity, education and support.

Team Tiger is led by young founder Tiger Greene, who, as a twelve-year-old boy, weighed 250 pounds (twice the normal weight for a child his age). Tiger was bullied for his weight and had trouble with simple everyday tasks. By making lifestyle changes and learning about healthy food and exercise, Tiger lost over 60 pounds. Tiger has become a national spokesperson for this curable epidemic. He has been featured on national television programs, including: Dr. Oz, CNN's Dr. Sanjay Gupta, Anderson Cooper 360, NBC and ABC affiliates and was a featured speaker at the Georgia Children's Health Alliance 'Refocus' Launch.

Following his love of football, Tiger partnered with the NFL, including player Marcus Stroud. Together they started a series of fitness camps to inspire thousands of young people to lose weight and get more active. These Sacking Obesity Health & Wellness Camps are run by Team Tiger and the Marcus Stroud Charitable Foundation.

Tiger Greene's Sacking Obesity: The Team Tiger Game Plan for Kids Who Want to Lose Weight, Feel Great, and Win on and off the Playing Field is a book published by HarperCollins Publishers that puts the camp experience into a book. It includes menu plans, exercise routines, and inspirational stories about kids who have decided to make good choices in their lives.

On Wednesday, September 19, 2012, Governor Nathan Deal of Georgia declared "Team Tiger Day" in the State of Georgia.
