= María José (singer) =

Mexican actress and musician

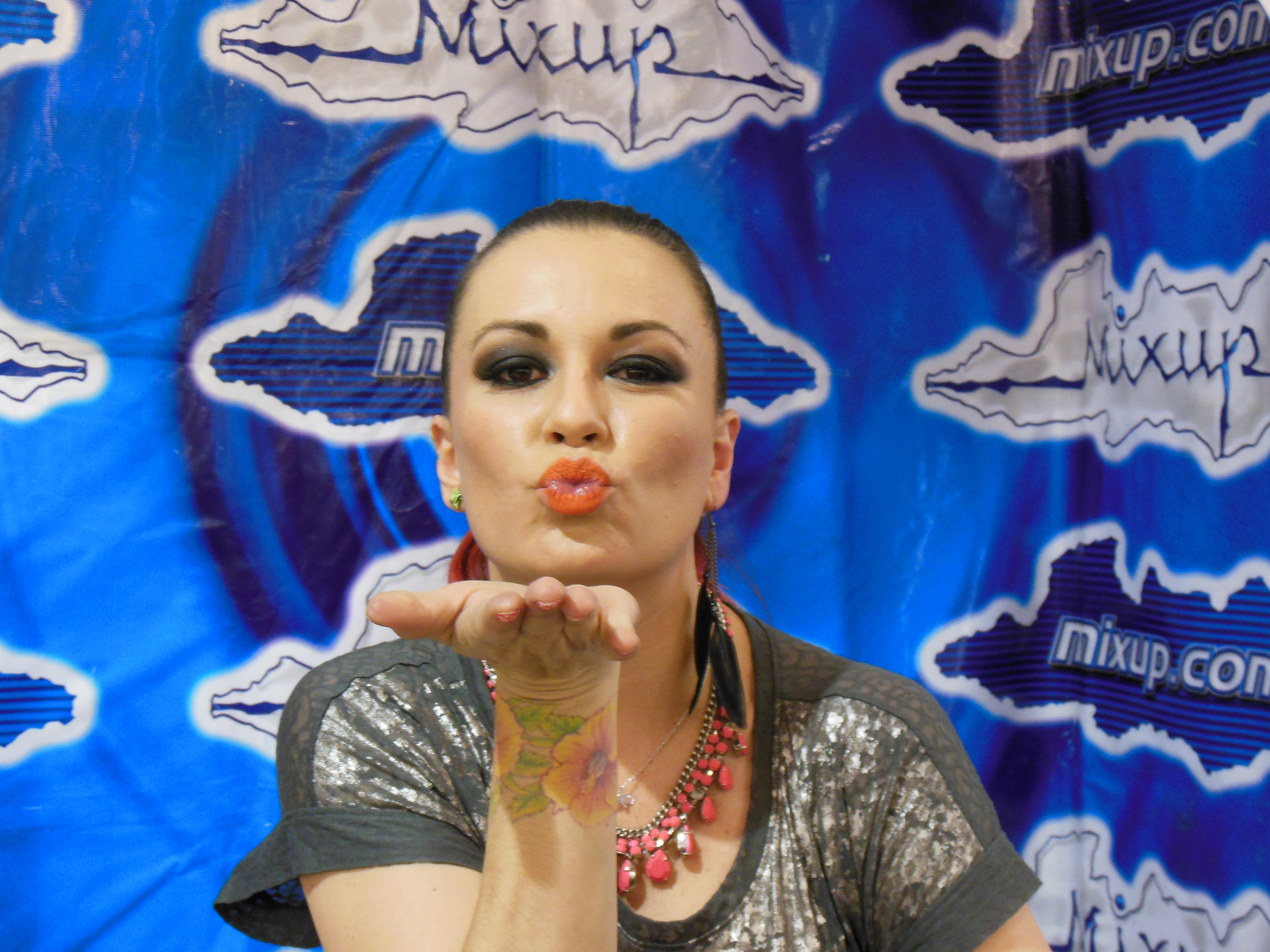
- Born: María José Loyola Anaya; January 12, 1976 (age 50); Mexico City, Mexico
- Other name: La Josa
- Occupations: Singer; songwriter; dancer; actress; host
- Years active: 1992–present
- Spouse: Mauricio García (m. 2003)
- Children: 1
- Musical career
- Genres: Pop; Latin pop
- Instrument: Vocals
- Labels: Warner (2006-2007); OCESA Seitrack (2007-present)
- Member of: Kabah
- Website: mariajoseoficial.com

María José Loyola Anaya (born January 12, 1976), known professionally as María José, is a Mexican singer, ballerina, flamenco dancer, athlete and television personality. Her career started at age 15, in the 1990s, when she joined the Mexican band Kabah as a vocalist. After leaving the band in 2006, she continued on as a solo artist and has released six studio albums to date.

== Biography ==
María José received a B.A. in communications before becoming a well-known and established vocalist during the time when she was part of Kabah, from the mid- to late-1990s.

Her first experience on stage was at age 14, as a dancer in the Spanish Dance Company led by Maria Elena Anaya. She remained in the company participating with flamenco songs as well.

== Career as a solo singer ==
During 2007, María José posed for the cover of MAX magazine, the equivalent of Maxim in the US.

She opened for Gwen Stefani's The Sweet Escape Tour in Mexico. This part of the tour included concerts in Arena Monterrey in Monterrey and in Palacio de los Deportes in Mexico City. She also appeared in the Reventour, a series of concerts in several places in Mexico, both as a singer and as a host.

In late July, she was part of an American tour with Lu and Motel and announced the release of her first album in August in the United States, which she promoted extensively. She was also invited to participate in Hoy No Me Puedo Levantar, the Mexican musical based on the career and songs of the Spanish pop group Mecano.

She was nominated for Best New Artist in the Premios Oye!, the Mexican equivalent of the Grammys. She participated in El Show de los Sueños from September 30 to October 19, 2008, finishing in fourth place. In the first show, along with her counterpart Thalía, she sang "Tocando Fondo". In the following show the two sang "Te Aprovechas". In the third show they sang "No me quedas mas" and in the fourth show they sang "Quererte a ti". In the fifth show "Amores Extranos" followed by the sixth show with "Amiga Mia".

On February 6, 2010, a member of the San Francisco Board of Supervisors proclaimed February 6 as "María José Day" during her club performance in the city.

=== 2007-2008: First album María José ===
In 2007, her first solo album, María José, was announced and the first single "Quien Eres Tu?", featuring Trey Songz and of dance and hip-hop influences, started to receive airplay in Mexico.

Two weeks after its release, the album reached number 84 in the Mexican charts. This song also appeared on iTunes as a free single during the week of January 11, 2008.

She has said in various interviews that she expected the second single to be "Mas de ti" or "Habla menos". "Me Equivoque", another track from the album, had major digital sales in Mexico.

In late August, "Me Equivoque", along with its video, was released. "¿Donde Esta?", the third and final single of the album, was officially released in April 2008. The song's video was filmed in Mexico City at Estudios Churubusco. 20 fans, who were chosen after winning a contest, were invited to attend the filming.

María José announced on April 18, 2008, that she had officially left Warner Music. No explanation was given, but her third single was released as an independent artist and not with the help of Warner Music.

=== 2009-2011: Amante de lo Ajeno and Amante de lo Bueno ===
Promotion of her second album began with a short performance as the opening act of Rihanna's Disturbia tour in Mexico City on January 24, 2009. She premiered the song "No soy una señora" during the show.

Amante de lo ajeno was released on May 12, 2009. It consists of 11 songs that had been hits by pop divas in the 1980s.

"No soy una señora" was released as the first single on March 2, and became very popular in Mexico, especially among teenagers. The follow-up singles were "Mi Amor, Amor" and "Adelante Corazón", both of which experienced success in Mexican charts. The fourth single was planned to be "Sola No, Yo No Se Estar", but was scrapped due to the release of her third album.

María José released her third album, Amante de lo Bueno, on November 9, 2010. It is another compilation of hits from the 1980s. The first single, "La Ocasión Para Amarnos", was released in October. The single became another huge success in Mexico.

=== 2012-2018: De Noche and Habla Ahora ===
María José released her fourth album, De Noche worldwide on iTunes on August 15, 2012. It was her second album with all new songs. The first single, "Tú Ya Sabes a Mí", was released in June 2012. "Extraña" was released as a single in Spain.

María José released her fifth album, Habla Ahora worldwide on iTunes on October 21, 2016. It is her third album to feature original content. The first single, "Las Que Se Ponen Bien La Falda", featuring Puerto Rican rapper Ivy Queen, was released on May 13, 2016. The title track "Habla Ahora" was released as the second single from the album preceding the release of the album.

=== 2019-present: Live Album Conexión, Esta historia me suena and La Voz ===
In 2019, María José released a live album, Conexión. It was released on June 7, 2019, by OCESA Seitrack. The album was recorded in front of a selected audience at the concert in Mexico City. In celebration of the tenth anniversary of her breakout album Amante de lo Ajeno, the album celebrates José's trajectory as a solo artist. The album includes material from her previous five studio albums as well as eight newly recorded songs. Featured guests include Ha*Ash, Yuri, Carlos Rivera and Vanesa Martin. In 2019, she became a judge of TV Azteca's México tiene talento and also became a host of Televisa's new drama series Esta historia me suena with Jen Carlo Bautista, in which she also appeared as an actress in a few episodes. On January 21, 2020, it was announced that she would return to TV Azteca, as a coach of La Voz with Ricardo Montaner, Belinda and Christian Nodal. She later returned for her second and final season in 2021 with Miguel Bosé, Edith Marquez, and Jesús Navarro.

== Influences ==
María José has said many times that a few of her major influences are Mariah Carey, Rocío Dúrcal, Mecano, Moenia, Celine Dion, Christina Aguilera, Madonna, Eugenia León and Boyz II Men.

== Discography ==
=== Solo artist ===
==== Studio albums ====
List of studio albums, with selected chart positions and certifications
Title	Album details	Peak	Certifications
Title	Album details	MEX	Certifications
María José	Released: April 2, 2007; Formats: CD, digital download; Label: Warner Music	84	
Amante de lo Ajeno	Released: May 12, 2009; Formats: CD, digital download; Label: Sei Track Musica, Sony Music	2	AMPROFON: 2× Platinum
Amante de lo Bueno	Released: November 9, 2010; Formats: CD, digital download; Label: Sei Track Musica, Sony Music	1	AMPROFON: Platinum+Gold
De Noche	Released: October 16, 2012; Formats: CD, digital download; Label: Sei Track Musica, Sony Music	3	AMPROFON: Gold
Habla Ahora	Released: October 21, 2016; Formats: CD, digital download; Label: Sei Track Musica, Sony Music	3	
Libertad	Released: January 26, 2023; Formats: CD, digital download; Label: Sei Track Musica, Sony Music		

==== Live albums ====
List of live albums, with selected chart positions and certifications
Title	Album details	Peak	Certifications
Title	Album details	MEX	Certifications
Conexión	Released: June 7, 2019; Formats: CD + DVD, digital download; Label: OCESA Seitrack, Sony Music	2	AMPROFON: Gold

=== Singles ===
==== As lead artist ====
List of Spanish singles, with selected chart positions and certifications, showing year released and album name
Title	Year	Peak chart positions			Certifications	Album
Title	Year	Airplay	Español Airplay	MEX	Certifications	Album
"¿Quien Eres Tu?"	2007	—	—	—		María José
"Me Equivoqué" (featuring Trey Songz)	2007	—	—	—		María José
"¿Donde Esta?"	2008	—	—	—		María José
"No Soy Una Señora"	2009	—	—	—		Amante de lo Ajeno
"Mi Amor Amor"	2009	—	—	—		Amante de lo Ajeno
"Adelante Corazón"	2010	—	—	—		Amante de lo Ajeno
"Sola No, Yo No Se Estar"	2010	—	—	—		Amante de lo Ajeno
"La Ocasión Para Amarnos"	2010	—	—	—	AMPROFON: Gold	Amante de lo Bueno
"Un Nuevo Amor"	2011	—	—	—		Amante de lo Bueno
"Después De Tu Adiós"	2011	—	—	—		Amante de lo Bueno
"Tú Ya Sabes A Mí"	2012	—	—	—	AMPROFON: Gold	De Noche
"El Amor Manda"	2012	—	—	—	AMPROFON: 2× Platinum	De Noche
"Prefiero Ser Su Amante"	2013	—	—	—	AMPROFON: Gold	De Noche
"La Cara Oculta Del Amor"	2013	—	—	—		Habla Ahora
"Las Qué Se Ponen Bien La Falda" (featuring Ivy Queen)	2016	23	5	5		Habla Ahora
"Habla Ahora"	2016	—	—	—		Habla Ahora
"Lo Que Te Mereces"	2017	—	—	—		Habla Ahora
"El Amor Coloca"	2017	—	—	—		Habla Ahora
"Duri Duri"	2017	—	—	—		Habla Ahora
"Hábito de Ti" (featuring Vanessa Martin)	2019	—	—	—		Conexión
"Un Nuevo Amor"	2019	—	—	—		Conexión
""Derroche"	2019	—	—	—		Conexión
"Lo Que Tenías Conmigo"	2019	—	—	—		Conexión
"Ya No Me Acuerdo Más de Ti" (with Carlos Rivera)	2021	—	—	—		Conexión
"All I Want for Christmas is You" (with Paty Cantú and María León)	2022	—	—	—		Non-album single
"Me Quedo Aquí Abajo"	2022	—	—	—		Libertad
"Culpable o Inocente"	2022	—	—	—		Libertad
"Arrepentida y Sola"	2022	—	—	—		Libertad
"Pecado Original"	2022	—	—	—		Libertad
"—" denotes items that did not chart or were not released.

==== Promotional singles ====
List of promotional singles, with selected chart positions, showing year released and album name
Title	Year	Peak chart positions	Album
Title	Year	MEX	Album
"El Era Perfecto"	2019	—	Conexión
"Rosas en Mi Almohada" (featuring Ha*Ash)	2020	3	Conexión

==== As featured artist ====
List of Spanish singles, with selected chart positions and certifications, showing year released and album name
Title	Year	Peak chart positions		Album
Title	Year	Airplay	Español Airplay	Album
"Te Besé" (featuring Leonel García)	2013	—	—	Todas mías
"Resistiré México" (among Artists for Mexico)	2020	15	4	Non-album single
"No Va A Ser Fácil (Remix)" (with Gian Marco)	2021	—	—	Mandarina
"Prohibido Amarnos" (with María León)	2022	—	—	Alquimia

== Filmography ==
Year	Title	Role	Notes
2009-10	Atrévete a Soñar	Herself	
2011-12	Pequeños Gigantes	Herself	Judge; seasons 1–2
2012-13	Porque el amor manda	Lic. María José	Guest cast/theme interpreter
2017	Bailando Por un Sueño	Herself	Judge
2018	Por amar sin ley	Patricia Linares	Guest; 2 episodes
2019	Ringo	Herself	
2019	La reina soy yo	Herself	
2019-2020	Esta historia me suena	Main host	Three seasons, appeared as actress on several occasions
2019	México tiene talento	Judge	First time working with TV Azteca
2020	Trolls World Tour	Barb	Voice role (Latin American dub)
2020–2021	La Voz	Herself	Coach
2021	La Voz Kids	Herself	Coach
2021	Te acuerdas de mí	Julio's girlfriend	Guest/theme interpreter
2021	La Voz Senior	Coach	
2023	¿Quién es la máscara?	Guest panelist	Season 5, episode 2
