= De Noche =

Studio album by María José
- Released: October 16, 2012
- Recorded: 2011–2012
- Genre: Latin pop, pop
- Label: Sei Track Musica

María José chronology
Amante de lo Bueno (2010)	De Noche (2012)	Habla Ahora (2016)

Singles from De Noche
- 1. "Tú Ya Sabes A Mí"; 2. "Extraña (Spain only)" 3. "El Amor Manda"; 4. "La Cara Oculta Del Amor (Spain only)" 5. "Prefiero Ser Su Amante"; 6. "Ahora o Nunca (Spain only)" 7. "El Brillo De la Luna (promotional only)"

De Noche is the fourth studio album by Mexican singer María José. It is her first album since her debut album to feature original content; her previous two albums were cover albums of songs from the 80's era. Preceded by the release of its lead single "Tú Ya Sabes A Mi", De Noche was met with positive reviews from both music critics and fans.

Three official singles were released from the album while three more were released only for Spain. "Tu Ya Sabes a Mi" marked the first time since "¿Dónde está?" since she released an original song. "Extraña" followed as the second single in Spain while "El Amor Manda" was chosen for the rest of Latin America and also served as the opening theme for the Mexican soap opera of the same name. Furthermore, the third and final single "Prefiero Ser Su Amante" was composed by fellow Mexican singer Paty Cantú, while "La Cara Oculta Del Amor" and "Ahora o Nunca" were the third and fourth singles released in Spain.

== Track listing ==
#	Title	Length
01.	"El Brillo de la Luna"	3:56
02.	"Extraña"	3:41
03.	"Tú Ya Sabes A Mí"	3:41
04.	"Tu Silencio"	3:59
05.	"Camaleón"	4:00
06.	"La Cara Oculta Del Amor"	3:53
07.	"Te Vas A Acordar De Mí"	3:33
08.	"Prefiero Ser Su Amante"	3:28
09.	"Analgésico"	3:25
10.	"Hoy Me Declaro En Libertad"	4:15
11.	"Ahora o Nunca"	3:33
12.	"Vete"	4:31
13.	"Se Nos Va la Vida"	3:17
14.	"El Amor Manda" (Bonus Track)	3:51

== Charts ==
The album debuted on the Mexican Albums Chart the album debuted at number 3, and on the Mexican International Albums Chart at number 2.

Chart (2010)	Peak position
Argentinian Albums Chart	5
Mexican Albums Chart	3
Mexican International Albums Chart	2

== Certifications ==
Region	Certification	Certified units/sales
Mexico (AMPROFON)	Gold	30,000^{^}
^{^} Shipments figures based on certification alone.
