= List of number-one albums of 2016 (Spain) =

Top 100 España is a record chart published weekly by PROMUSICAE (Productores de Música de España), a non-profit organization composed by Spain and multinational record companies. This association tracks record sales (physical and digital) in Spain.

== Albums ==
| Week | Chart date | Album | Artist(s) | Ref |
|---|---|---|---|---|
| 1 | January 7 | 25 | Adele | |
| 2 | January 14 | Blackstar | David Bowie | |
| 3 | January 21 | Blackstar | David Bowie | |
| 4 | January 28 | 25 | Adele | |
| 5 | February 4 | Lubna | Mónica Naranjo | |
| 6 | February 11 | Lubna | Mónica Naranjo | |
| 7 | February 18 | Canciones para robots románticos | Fangoria | |
| 8 | February 25 | Canciones para robots románticos | Fangoria | |
| 9 | March 3 | 25 | Adele | |
| 10 | March 10 | El Poeta Halley | Love of Lesbian | |
| 11 | March 17 | El Poeta Halley | Love of Lesbian | |
| 12 | March 24 | Head For The Stars | Sweet California | |
| 13 | March 31 | Head For The Stars | Sweet California | |
| 14 | April 7 | Head For The Stars | Sweet California | |
| 15 | April 14 | Jo competeixo | Manel | |
| 16 | April 21 | Jo competeixo | Manel | |
| 17 | April 28 | Viento del Este | Loquillo | |
| 18 | May 5 | Lleno de vida | Adrián | |
| 19 | May 12 | Lleno de vida | Adrián | |
| 20 | May 19 | Lleno de vida | Adrián | |
| 21 | May 26 | Dangerous Woman | Ariana Grande | |
| 22 | June 2 | 7/27 | Fifth Harmony | |
| 23 | June 9 | Amor de los dos | David Bustamante | |
| 24 | June 16 | Amor de los dos | David Bustamante | |
| 25 | June 23 | Bailar el viento | Manuel Carrasco | |
| 26 | June 30 | Soy Luna | Various artists | |
| 27 | July 7 | Soy Luna | Various artists | |
| 28 | July 14 | Senti2 | Antonio José | |
| 29 | July 21 | Senti2 | Antonio José | |
| 30 | July 28 | Senti2 | Antonio José | |
| 31 | August 4 | Senti2 | Antonio José | |
| 32 | August 11 | Bailar el viento | Manuel Carrasco | |
| 33 | August 18 | Bailar el viento | Manuel Carrasco | |
| 34 | August 25 | Bailar el viento | Manuel Carrasco | |
| 35 | September 1 | Monstruos | Leiva | |
| 36 | September 8 | Monstruos | Leiva | |
| 37 | September 15 | Monstruos | Leiva | |
| 38 | September 22 | Gracias | Gemeliers | |
| 39 | September 29 | La Montaña Rusa | Dani Martín | |
| 40 | October 6 | La Montaña Rusa | Dani Martín | |
| 41 | October 13 | MTV Unplugged | Miguel Bosé | |
| 42 | October 20 | El Doble de tu mitad | Rulo y La Contrabanda | |
| 43 | October 27 | Te cuento un secreto | India Martínez | |
| 44 | November 3 | Casa | Iván Ferreiro | |
| 45 | November 10 | El planeta imaginario | La Oreja de Van Gogh | |
| 46 | November 17 | Quítate las gafas | Melendi | |
| 47 | November 24 | Munay | Vanesa Martín Mata | |
| 48 | December 1 | Quítate las gafas | Melendi | |
| 49 | December 8 | Hijos del mar | David Bisbal | |
| 50 | December 15 | Hijos del mar | David Bisbal | |
| 51 | December 22 | Quítate las gafas | Melendi | |
| 52 | December 29 | Quítate las gafas | Melendi | |
