= Amante de lo Bueno =

Studio album by María José
- Released: November 9, 2010
- Recorded: 2009–2010
- Genre: Latin pop, pop
- Label: Sei Track Musica
- Producer: Loris Ceroni

María José chronology
Amante de lo Ajeno (2009)	Amante de lo Bueno (2010)	De Noche (2012)

Special Edition cover

Singles from Amante de lo Bueno
- 1. "La Ocasión Para Amarnos"; 2. "Un Nuevo Amor"; 3. "Después De Tu Adiós"

Amante de lo Bueno (Lover of Good Things) is the third album by the Mexican singer María José, and the second cover album followed by the critical success of her sophomore album Amante de lo Ajeno. Described by the singer herself as a "side b" to the last album, she stated she felt the need to record another cover album to add songs she did not get the chance to include on the past album. The album was re-released a year after its release as a Special Edition that included three newly recorded covers plus a DVD featuring concert footage from the album's accompanying tour.

== Track listing ==
#	Title	Length
01.	"Un Nuevo Amor"	3:55
02.	"Francamente"	3:47
03.	"La Ocasión Para Amarnos"	3:59
04.	"No Soy Una Muñeca"	3:36
05.	"Después De Tu Adiós"	3:29
06.	"Castillos"	3:59
07.	"Sera El Ángel"	3:50
08.	"Baila"	3:52
09.	"Este Amor Ya No Se Toca"	3:35
10.	"Completamente Tuya"	4:08
11.	"Corazón Encadenado"	3:29

Special Edition bonus tracks
No.	Title	Length
12.	"Fijate Que No"	2:54
13.	"Hoy Tengo Ganas de Ti"	3:49
14.	"Si Pero No"	3:24

Special Edition bonus DVD: María José en Concierto
No.	Title	Length
1.	"Castillos"
2.	"No Soy Una Muñeca"
3.	"Fijate Que No" (Duet with Paty Cantú)
4.	"Este Amor No Se Toca"
5.	"Medley" (Sola No, Yo No Se Estar / ¿Quien Eres Tú? / Este Hombre No Se Toca)
6.	"Un Nuevo Amor"
7.	"Me Equivoque"
8.	"Mi Amor, Amor"
9.	"La Ocasion Para Amarnos"
10.	"Adelante Corazon"
11.	"No Soy Una Señora"

== Singles ==
=== "La Ocasion Para Amarnos" ===
La Ocasion Para Amarnos

"La Ocasion Para Amarnos" ("The Occasion to Love Us") was released as the lead single from Maria Jose's third album Amante de lo Ajeno. Following the theme from her past album, the single is cover originally sung by Mexican actress and singer Daniela Romo.

=== "Un Nuevo Amor" ===
"Un Nuevo Amor"

"Un Nuevo Amor" ("A New Love") was released as the second single from the album. It was originally sung by Maria Del Sol.

== Charts ==
Chart (2009)	Peak position
Mexican Albums (Top 100 Mexico)	1

== Certifications ==
Region	Certification	Certified units/sales
Mexico (AMPROFON)	Platinum+Gold	90,000^{^}
^{^} Shipments figures based on certification alone.
