= Kabah (band) =

Mexican band

Background information
- Origin: Mexico City, Mexico
- Genres: Latin pop; Eurodance
- Years active: 1992–2005; 2015–present
- Labels: Mercury; Rodven; Polygram; Universal; WEA; Warner; Ariola; BMG; BOBO Productions
- Members: Daniela Magún; René Ortiz Martinez; Sergio Ortiz O'Farril; Federica Quijano Tapia; André Quijano Tapia
- Past members: Maria José Loyola
- Website: facebook.com/grupo.kabah

Kabah is a Mexican group based in Mexico City. It was formed in 1992 and disbanded in 2005. In 2015, they reunited and went on a tour with OV7 titled "OV7 Kabah Tour." They were named after Kabah, a Maya archeological site. Some of their greatest hits are: "Vive," "La Vida Que Va," "Mai Mai," "Te Necesito," "Al Pasar," "Una Ilusión," "Antro," "Estaré," "Casi al Final," "La Calle de las Sirenas," and "Amigas y Rivales"- the latter of which served as the theme song to the soap opera of the same name.

== History ==
=== 1992 - 1995: Formation of Kabah, Successful debut with "Kabah" ===
Kabah was formed in 1992 by Federica Quijano and her brother Andres. Their cousin Sergio O'Farrill was next to be added to the group, and later their neighbor and friend María José. At the time there were many pop groups in Mexico with four members, so Federica and André decided to add longtime friends René and Daniela, bringing the total to six.

Shortly after the addition of these final two members, they did a cover for the group The Party. The song was called Encontré El Amor (I Found Love). Shortly after the release of Encontré El Amor, the group recorded this and another song, Somos Tan Differentes (We are so different) at Gil Brothers studios, forming a two-song demo tape

Eager to show their talent, they were given the chance to sing their two songs at a popular club. However, they were ill-received by the audience and ultimately booed off the stage. Their second show came at the end of 1993 at a kindergarten where Federica worked as a teacher's assistant. For this show, they remade their two songs, giving them a more child friendly feel. This event marked their careers, as they realized they could find greater favor among younger audiences.

Despite their hopes however, they were initially turned down by several producers, such as Cha, Claudio Yarto and Aleks Syntek. It was not until Federica accidentally came across the phone number for Televisa that they found success. After calling Luis de Llano, the only music producer of the network, they were asked to come in for a meeting.

Luis told them about a singing talent show called Valores Juveniles, and suggested they spend a few months practicing for it. They then signed a contract for one album with Polygram Music, and soon after their first album, Kabah, was finished. They then went on to win the talent show with their first song, "Encontré El Amor." The album, which was officially released in 1994, contained four songs written by the group and was a success among the younger population.

=== 1996 - 2000: Signing with Polygram Music, Second album "La Calle De Las Sirenas," Third album "XNE" ===
The first album was such a success that Polygram Music decided to sign them and gave them a contract to make two more albums. They started recording a second album which would be titled La Calle de las Sirenas (The Street Of The Mermaids). It was released in 1996 and was recorded in Los Angeles. La Calle de las Sirenas opened many doors for the group, and carried them to international fame.

1998's Esperanto followed, selling a record of 100,000 copies in the first week. It featured the singles "Mai Mai," "Una Ilusión," and "Esperanto." In 2000, the next follow-up, XNE, led the group to a more conceptualized image and somewhat darker sound. It also contained "Amigas y Rivales," the theme song for the Mexican soap opera of the same name.

=== 2002 - 2005: Signed with Warner Music, Fourth album "La Vida Que Va," Fifth album "El Pop," and disbandment ===
In 2002, they returned to a lighter sound with La Vida Que Va, which was recorded in Norway under the Warner Music label and produced by Ole Evenrude. La Vuelta al Mundo, was released in 2003, and the band's final album, El Pop, was released in 2005. El Pop featured acoustic versions of a few of their greatest-hits, as well as two new songs. A farewell tour took them all across North America, concluding with a final show on December 31, 2005, on the bay of Acapulco, Mexico.

=== 2014 - 2015: Reunion Tour with OV7 ===
Late in 2014 Kabah announced, along with OV7, a reunion tour scheduled for 2015. The OV7 Kabah Tour, has been a major success in Mexico and Latin America with over 60 shows played all over more than 20 cities around Mexico. In 2015, they issued OV7 Kabah en Vivo. It was released on August 21, 2015.

=== 2018 - Present: 90's Pop Tour, Signed with Bobo Production, Rainbow Tour subunit ===
Kabah embarked on a world concert tour called "90's Pop Tour" in 2018 and 2019, along with OV7, JNS, Magneto, Calo, Mercurio, and The Sacados.

During early 2020, Kabah had signed a contract with BOBO Production to begin promotions. By March, it was revealed that a Sub-unit was introduced which consisted all the members of Kabah and JNS who would go by Rainbow Tour. They opened up their Instagram page and began promotions for concert events taking place in Mexico.

== Members ==
Most of Kabah's members are still active.

- María José, better known as "Josa," released her solo album on March 30, 2007, for the record label Warner Music. The album includes 10 songs, 2 reworked versions of her first single, and one remix of 'Habla Menos'. The first single, 'Quien Eres Tu' (Who Are You) debuted on December 16, 2006.
- Sergio O'Farrill, Nickname "Blu," is an accomplished Designer/Developer, Skydiver and has his own solo project called Moroccoblu. The release of his debut album was expected in 2009 but it was not released. He continues to release songs through his Soundcloud page
- Federica Quijano Tapia starred in the movie Pamela por amor, which released in 2008. Since Federica is interested in helping new musical talent, she also founded La Gotera Producciones, a company focused on helping young musicians. After it was made public that she had nude scenes in "Pamela," Penthouse approached her with a contract offer. Federica appeared on the cover of Penthouse for February 2007 issue. In 2007 and 2008. Federica was a host on Exa TV's program KIU. KIU is a TV show dedicated to inform young adults about sexuality. In 2021, she became a member of the Mexican Chamber of Deputies representing the Ecologist Green Party of Mexico.
- Daniela Magun, "La Dana," currently works as co-host for Pepsi Chart Mexico. She is also the spokeswoman for Mexico Vivo, a charity organization focused on informing people about HIV and AIDS.
- André Quijano Tapia, Nickname “apio,” is currently participating in reality TV show, La casa de los famosos Mexico.

== Tours ==
- Viva El Pop Tour (2005)

Date	City	Country	Venue
July 22	San Salvador	El Salvador	Anfiteatro del Centro Internacional de Ferias y Convenciones
October 15	Mexicali	Mexico	Plaza de Toros Califia
October 21	Mexico City	Mexico	Auditorio Nacional
October 22	Mexico City	Mexico	Auditorio Nacional
October 23	Zapopan	Mexico	Auditorio Benito Juárez
November 5	Mexico City	Mexico	Auditorio Nacional
December 31	Acapulco	Mexico	Forum Mundo Imperial

== Discography ==
=== Studio albums ===
Title	Album details	Certifications
Kabah	Released: 1994; Formats: CD; Label: Mercury, Polygram	
La Calle de las Sirenas	Released: 1996; Formats: CD; Label: Mercury, Polygram	
Esperanto	Released: 1998; Formats: CD; Label: Rodven, Polygram	AMPROFON: 2× Gold
XNE	Released: 2000; Formats: CD, digital download; Label: Mercury, Universal	AMPROFON: Gold
La Vida Que Va	Released: 2002; Formats: CD, digital download; Label: WEA, Warner Music	AMPROFON: Gold
La Vuelta al Mundo	Released: 2003; Formats: CD, digital download, streaming; Label: WEA, Warner Music	
El Pop	Released: 2005; Formats: CD, digital download, streaming; Label: Ariola, BMG	AMPROFON: Platinum

=== Live albums ===
Title	Album details	Certifications
OV7 & Kabah En Vivo	Released: 2015; Formats: CD, DVD, digital download, streaming; Label: Sony Music México	AMPROFON: 2× Platinum
