= Paty Cantú discography =

This is the discography for Mexican singer Paty Cantú.

== Studio albums ==
List of albums, with selected chart positions, sales figures and certifications
Title	Album details	Peak chart positions	Certifications
Title	Album details	MEX	Certifications
Me Quedo Sola	Released: January 27, 2009; Label: EMI; Format: CD, digital download	3	
Afortunadamente No Eres Tú	Released: August 17, 2010; Label: EMI; Format: CD, digital download	10	
Corazón Bipolar	Released: November 6, 2012; Label: EMI; Format: CD, digital download	8	AMPROFON: Gold
#333	Released: May 25, 2018; Label: Universal Music México; Format: CD, digital download	4	AMPROFON: Gold
La Mexicana	Released: October 30, 2020; Label: Universal Music México; Format: CD, digital download	—	
"—" denotes releases that did not chart.

== Live albums ==
List of compilation albums, with selected chart positions and certifications
Title	Album details	Peak chart positions	Certifications
Title	Album details	MEX	Certifications
Drama Queen En Vivo	Released: March 18, 2014; Label: Universal Music Mexico; Formats: CD, LP, digital download	4	AMPROFON: Gold

== Singles ==
=== As lead artist ===
List of singles, with selected chart positions
Title	Year	Peak chart positions		Certifications	Album
Title	Year	MEX	US Latin	Certifications	Album
"Déjame Ir"	2008	—	2		Me Quedo Sola
"No Fue Suficiente"	2009	—	5		Me Quedo Sola
"Me Quedo Sola"	2009	—	—		Me Quedo Sola
"Afortunadamente No Eres Tú"	2010	—	3		Afortunadamente No Eres Tú
"Clavo Que Saca Otro Clavo"	2010	—	5		Afortunadamente No Eres Tú
"Goma De Mascar"	2011	—	—		Afortunadamente No Eres Tú
"Se Desintegra El Amor"	2011	—	—		Afortunadamente No Eres Tú
"Adelante" (featuring María León, Rodrigo Dávila, Ha*Ash)	2012	—	—		Non-album single
"Corazón Bipolar"	2012	—	3		Corazón Bipolar
"Suerte"	2013	—	5		Corazón Bipolar
"Manual"	2013	—	—		Corazón Bipolar
"Valiente"	2015	—	1	AMPROFON: Platinum	#333
"Amor, Amor, Amor"	2016	—	3		#333
"Rompo Contigo"	2016	—	—		#333
"Natural" (featuring Juhn)	2018	—	—	AMPROFON: Platinum	#333
"War (En Vivo)" (featuring Bea Miller)	2018	—	—		#333
"Cuenta Pendiente" (featuring Alejandro Sanz)	2018	—	2		#333Deluxe
"Cuando vuelvas"	2020	—	—		La Mexicana
"Llevame contigo"	2020	—	—		La Mexicana
"No Hacemos Nada"	2020	—	—		La Mexicana
"La Mexicana" (featuring Hispana)	2020	—	—		La Mexicana
"Conocerte"	2020	—	—		La Mexicana
"Odiarte" (featuring Lasso)	2020	—	—		La Mexicana
"Si Yo Fuera Tú" (featuring María Becerra)	2020	—	—		La Mexicana
"Bailo Sola"	2022	—	—		Piscis
"Guadalajara" (featuring Neto Peña and Gera MX)	2022	—	—		Piscis
"Mi Película"	2022	—	—		Piscis
"Feliz Breakup" (featuring Ximena Sariñana and Zzoilo)	2023	—	—		Piscis
"—" denotes a title that did not chart.

=== As featured artist ===
List of singles, with selected chart positions
Title	Year	Peak chart positions			Album
Title	Year	Airplay	Español Airplay	US Latin	Album
"Dos Palabras" (Motel featuring Paty Cantú)	2008	—	3	41	17
"La Copa de Todos" (David Correy featuring Wisin and Paty Cantú)	2014	—	14	4	Non-album single
"Entre Tu Boca y La Mía" (Álex Ubago featuring Paty Cantú)	2017	—	—	—	Non-album single
"Resistiré México" (among Artists for Mexico)	2020	4	15	—	Non-album single
"Apagar" (Raquel Sofía featuring Paty Cantú)	2021	—	—	—	Non-album single
"All I Want for Christmas is You" (María José, María León and Paty Cantú)	2022	—	—	—	Non-album single
"Que Pasaría" (Vadhir featuring Paty Cantú)	2022	—	—	—	Non-album single
"El Anillo y Vos" (SER featuring Paty Cantú)	2023	—	—	—	Non-album single
"En el Alma" (Motel featuring Paty Cantú)	2023	—	—	—	Non-album single
"—" denotes a title that did not chart.
