= La Voz (Mexican TV series) season 11 =

La Voz
- Season 11
- Hosted by: Eddy Vilard; Sofía Aragón
- Coaches: David Bisbal; Yuridia; Ha*Ash; Joss Favela
- Winner: Fátima Elizondo
- Winning coach: Yuridia
- Runner-up: Anyelique Solorio

Release
- Original network: Azteca Uno
- Original release: June 6 – August 29, 2022

Season chronology
- ← Previous; Season 10

The eleventh season of La Voz premiered on June 6, 2022, on Azteca Uno. The coaching panel was formed by David Bisbal, Yuridia, Ha*Ash and Joss Favela, who replaced María José, Miguel Bosé, Edith Márquez and Jesús Navarro. Eddy Vilard and Sofía Aragón both returned for their third season as hosts.

On Monday, August 29, 2022, Fátima Elizondo was announced the winner and crowned La Voz México 2022, alongside her coach Yuridia.

Yuridia became the second coach, after Carlos Rivera in season seven, to win the show after both being participants of TV Azteca's musical reality La Academia. Moreover, Yuridia became the ninth coach in eleven seasons (except Alejandro Sanz and Laura Pausini) to win on their debut season.

== Coaches ==
Coaches of La Voz México season 11

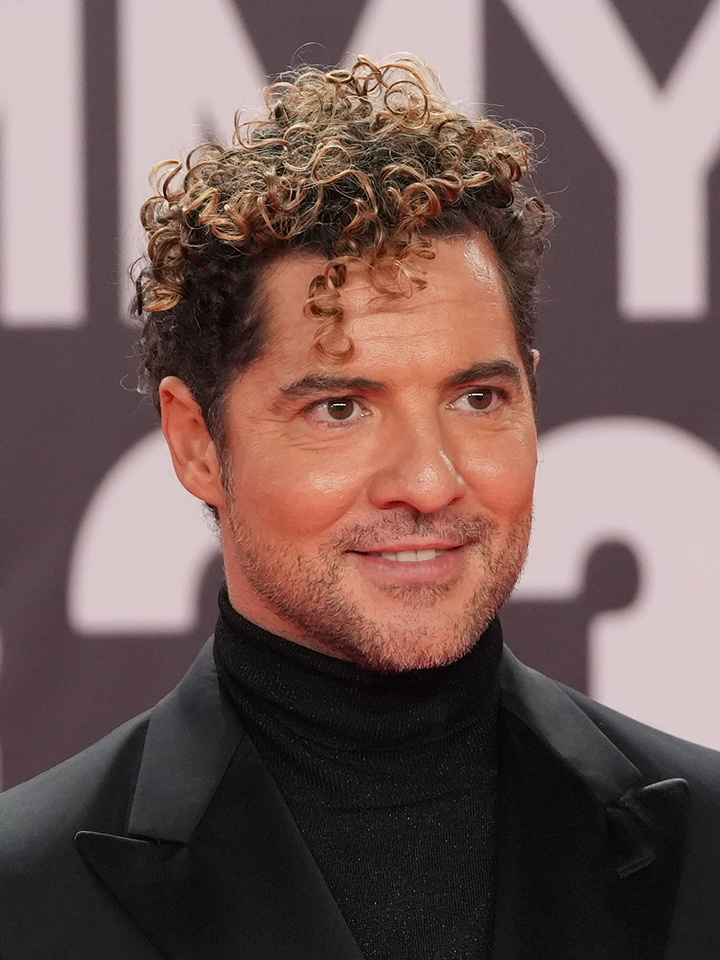
David Bisbal

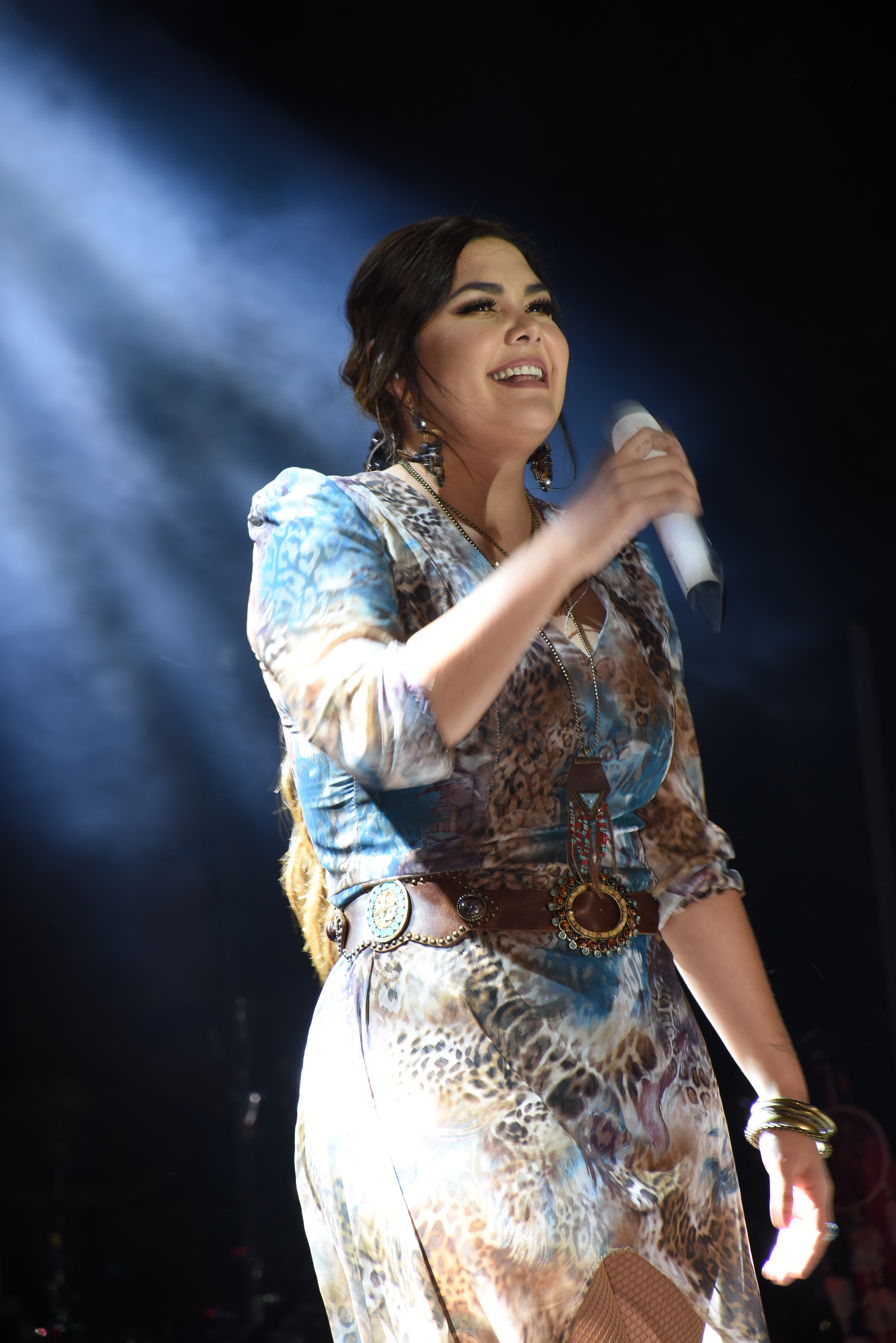
Yuridia

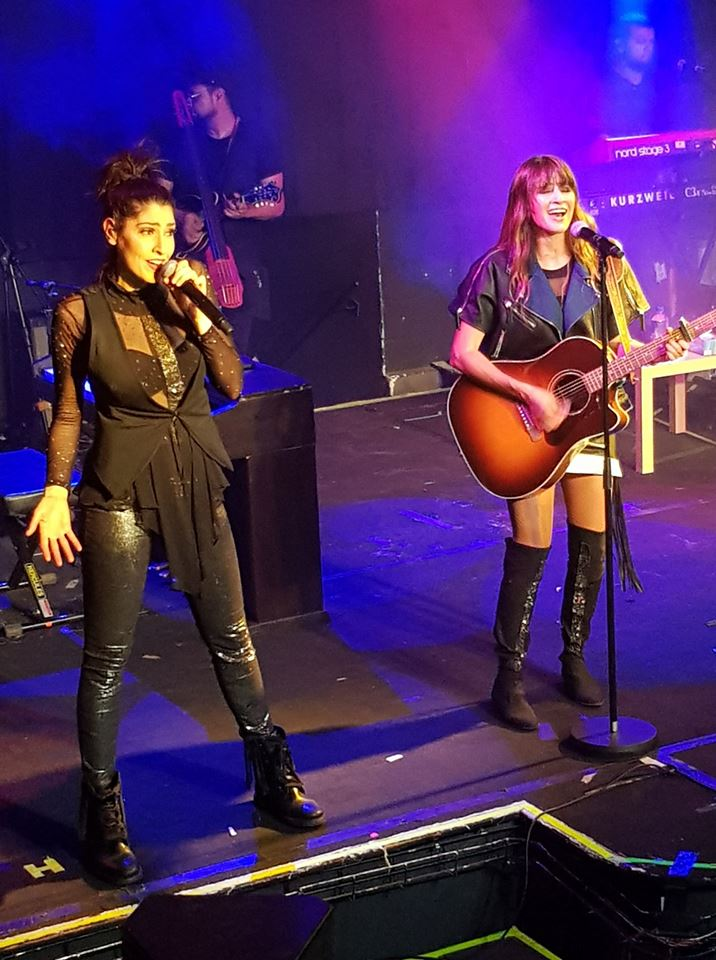
Ha*Ash

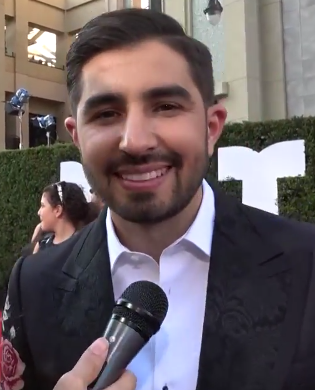
Joss Favela

Prior to filming starting in April 2022, reporter Pati Chapoy leaked that Yuridia and musical sister duo Ha*Ash would be coaches of this new season. Days later, they were officially confirmed by the TV network alongside the announcement of David Bisbal and Joss Favela, who had coached the third season and fourth kids version season, respectively.

== Teams ==
Color key

Winner
Runner-up
Third place
Fourth place
Eliminated in the Final Phase
Eliminated in the Top 3
Stolen in the Battles
Eliminated in the Battles
Stolen in the Knockouts
Eliminated in the Knockouts
Withdrew

Coaches	Top 120 artists					
David Bisbal						
David Bisbal	Anyelique Solorio	Gabriel García	José María Ortega	Patricia Chávez	César Valderrama	Elisa Torres
David Bisbal	Mauricio Villanueva	Marielys Basulto	Anibal Fernández	Nando Fortanell	Luis Máximo	Paty & Alisson
David Bisbal	~~Rafhael Ruiz~~	~~Pamela Cantú~~	Carlos Mendiola	Diana Antunez	Karina Villaseñor	Angelina Pipper
David Bisbal	Norma Casillas	Paloma Munguía	Eduardo Moreno	~~Jorge Mayorga~~	~~María Vera~~	~~Ulises Ronces~~
David Bisbal	Jana Adame	Dana Robles	Ángel Alaniz	Arely Rangel	Vicente Rodriguez	Blanca Estela Pavón
David Bisbal	Richard Figueroa	Nora Jiménez	Francisco Ibarra	Grecia Gamboa	Yosvani Gómez	Eri Garza
Yuridia						
Yuridia	Fátima Elizondo	Isabela Rodríguez	Jennifer Santos	Naomi Moreno	Víctor Bermant	Dania González
Yuridia	Cynthia Sajaropulos	Olga Thomas	Karlo Fuentes Gasca	Ernesto Tapia	Reyna Bosquez	Mauricio Montes de Oca
Yuridia	~~Joel Anaya~~	~~Luis Máximo~~	~~César Valderrama~~	~~Johana Torres~~	~~María Vera~~	Dueto Rocé
Yuridia	Erik Medrano	José Antonio Miranda	Getsemani Guzmán	~~Anyelique Solorio~~	~~Iván Orellana~~	~~Patricia Chávez~~
Yuridia	~~Carlos Mendiola~~	Laura Padilla	Reyna Fierro	María Goretti	Pamela Oscos	Iván Loga
Yuridia	Leididiana Mayorquin	Diana Lara	Denisse Castellanos	Mónica González	Pedro Tomás Cepeda	Eber Hernández
Ha*Ash						
Ha*Ash	Marcela López	Adrianna Foster	Brandon Parra	Stephanie Trejo	Jorge Mayorga	Verónica de la Tejera
Ha*Ash	Rafhael Ruiz	María Fernanda Medina	Joel Anaya	Pamela Cantú	Luis Alvarado	Astrid & Valentina
Ha*Ash	~~Alfonsina Aguirre~~	Yeudim Guerrero	Gloria Delgado	Daniel Mendoza	Iván Orellana	Adilene Corral
Ha*Ash	Lari Panini	Paola Chávez	Olivia Zamudio	~~Mauricio Villanueva~~	~~Iván Flores~~	Kenia Feria
Ha*Ash	Alan Cisneros	Michelle Azpetia	Karla López	Jahn y Gabriela Corral	Melanie Márquez	Jorge Valenzuela
Ha*Ash	Javier Manente	Elisa Elizondo	Erika Guerrero	Alexander Castillo	Dannia Salazar	Kathia Alejandra
Joss Favela						
Joss Favela	Sandra Guevara	Christian Valdés	Aeda Fernanda	Daniela Treviño	Adrián Cabrera	Marisol Hernández
Joss Favela	Johana Torres	Naomi Castelán	Alfonsina Aguirre	María Vera	Yudith Ascensio	Adriana Moroyoqui
Joss Favela	~~Mauricio Villanueva~~	~~Víctor Bermant~~	~~Ernesto Tapia~~	~~Naomi Moreno~~	Néstor Salas	Rafael Durán
Joss Favela	Ulises Ronces	Sebastián Espejo	Iván Flores	~~César Valderrama~~	~~Karlo Fuentes Gasca~~	~~Alfonsina Aguirre~~
Joss Favela	Mo-Wung Kang	Beatriz Ortega	Darvelio Ramos	Victoria Bracamonte	Juan Pablo Valdés	Marlen Ramón
Joss Favela	Johana Angulo	Daniel Loredo	Anisley Rodríguez	Sara Rodríguez	Javier Doñates	Gloria Rodríguez
Note: Italicized names are stolen artists (names struck through within former teams).

== Blind auditions ==
In the Blind auditions, each coach had to complete their team with 30 contestants. In this season, contestants who fail to pass the blind audition will leave the stage without a conversation with coaches being returned. Also, each coach had given four Blocks to prevent one of the other coaches from getting a contestant.

Blind auditions color key
✔	Coach pressed "QUIERO TU VOZ" button
	Artist defaulted to a coach's team
	Artist elected a coach's team
	Artist was eliminated with no coach pressing his or her "QUIERO TU VOZ" button
✘	Coach pressed the "QUIERO TU VOZ" button, but was blocked by David from getting the artist
✘	Coach pressed the "QUIERO TU VOZ" button, but was blocked by Yuridia from getting the artist
✘	Coach pressed the "QUIERO TU VOZ" button, but was blocked by Ha*Ash from getting the artist
✘	Coach pressed the "QUIERO TU VOZ" button, but was blocked by Joss from getting the artist

- The coaches performed Ha*Ash performed "Perdón, Perdón", David Bisbal performed "Dígale", Joss Favela performed "Te hubieras ido antes" and Yuridia performed "Ya es muy tarde".

Blind auditions results
Episode	Order	Artist	Age	Hometown	Song	Coach's and artist's choices			
Episode	Order	Artist	Age	Hometown	Song	David	Yuridia	Ha*Ash	Joss
Episode 1 (6 June)
Episode 1 (6 June)	1	Marcela López	26	Monterrey, Nuevo León	"Así soy"	✔	✔	✔	✔
Episode 1 (6 June)	2	Nando Fortanell	30	Mexico City	"Bad Habits"	✔	–	✔	–
Episode 1 (6 June)	3	Reyna Bosquez	31	Parral, Chihuahua	"Cuidado"	–	✔	✔	✔
Episode 1 (6 June)	4	Javier Doñates	29	Mexicali, Baja California	"Me equivoqué"	–	–	–	✔
Episode 1 (6 June)	5	Adrianna Foster	35	Miami, Florida	"Easy on Me"	✔	✘	✔	✔
Episode 1 (6 June)	6	Alfredo Torres	25	Torreón, Coahuila	"Si me tenías"	–	–	–	–
Episode 1 (6 June)	7	Stephanie Trejo	18	Huauchinango, Puebla	"Ahí donde me ven"	✔	✔	✔	–
Episode 1 (6 June)	8	Sebastián Espejo	32	Buenos Aires, Argentina	"Sobrio"	–	–	–	✔
Episode 1 (6 June)	9	César Valderrama	26	San Miguel de Allende, Guanajuato	"Granada"	✔	–	–	✔
Episode 1 (6 June)	10	Martín Vaca	37	Morelia, Michoacán	"Tal Vez"	–	–	–	–
Episode 1 (6 June)	11	Astrid & Valentina	18 & 43	Jojutla, Morelos	"Aprendiz"	✘	✔	✔	✔
Episode 1 (6 June)	12	Leididiana Mayorquin	40	El Rosario, Sinaloa	"Auque me cueste la vida"	✔	✔	✔	✔
Episode 1 (6 June)	13	María Vera	31	Tulancingo, Hidalgo	"Ain't No Mountain High Enough"	✔	✔	–	✔
Episode 1 (6 June)	14	Jennifer Santos	28	Playa del Carmen, Quintana Roo	"No me olvidaré de ti"	✔	✔	✔	✔
Episode 1 (6 June)	15	Daniela García	25	Guadalupe y Calvo, Chihuahua	"Ecos de amor"	–	–	–	–
Episode 1 (6 June)	16	Anisley Rodríguez	38	Tampico, Tamaulipas	"Ese hombre"	–	–	–	✔
Episode 1 (6 June)	17	Paloma Munguía	31	Hermosillo, Sonora	"Ven, devórame otra vez"	✔	–	✔	–

=== Episode 2 (June 7) ===
During the episode, David Bisbal performed "Se nos rompió el amor" and Yuridia performed "Ya te olvidé".

Order	Artist	Age	Hometown	Song	Coach's and artist's choices			
Order	Artist	Age	Hometown	Song	David	Yuridia	Ha*Ash	Joss
1	Daniel Mendoza	43	Monterrey, Nuevo León	"No podrás"	✔	–	✔	–
2	Héctor Hernández	46	Iztapalapa, Mexico City	"Paso la vida pensando"	–	–	–	–
3	Daniela Treviño	31	Toluca, State of Mexico	"You're My World"	✔	✔	✔	✔
4	Gorethy Grijalva	22	Delicias, Chihuahua	"La gata bajo la lluvia"	–	–	–	–
5	Mauricio Montes	24	Puebla, Puebla	"La mujer perfecta"	–	✔	✔	✔
6	Eduardo Moreno	16	Torreón, Coahuila	"Hasta que me olvides"	✔	–	–	✔
7	Marielys Basulto	31	Havana, Cuba	"Por qué me fui a enamorar de ti"	✔	✔	✘	✔
8	Sofía Trenti	27	Nuevo Casas Grandes, Chihuahua	"Eres tú"	–	–	–	–
9	Javier Manente	27	Neuquén, Argentina	"I Will Always Love You"	–	✔	✔	✔
10	Daniel Loredo	19	State of Mexico	"Decide tú"	✔	✔	✔	✔
11	Kenia Feria	20	Mexico City	"Lo que tenías conmigo"	–	✔	✔	–
12	Karina Villaseñor	35	Colima, Colima	"Sobreviviré"	✔	✔	✘	✔
13	Dania González	22	Tampico, Tamaulipas	"Recuérdame"	✔	✔	✔	✔
14	Víctor Bermant	16	Pánuco, Veracruz	"Seremos"	–	✔	–	✔
15	Jahn y Gabriela Corral	19 & 27	Ciudad Obregón, Sonora	"Solos"	✔	✔	✔	✔
16	Sergio Zavala	26	Monterrey, Nuevo León	"Favorito"	–	–	–	–
17	Eri Garza	31	Monterrey, Nuevo León	"Survivor"	✔	✔	✔	✔

=== Episode 3 (June 13) ===
During the episode, David Bisbal performed "Abriré la puerta" and Joss Favela performed "Gato de madrugada".

Order	Artist	Age	Hometown	Song	Coach's and artist's choices			
Order	Artist	Age	Hometown	Song	David	Yuridia	Ha*Ash	Joss
1	Pamela Cantú	19	Monterrey, Nuevo León	"Telepatía"	✔	✔	✔	✔
2	Cynthia Sajaropulos	28	Guadalajara, Jalisco	"Smells Like Teen Spirit"	✘	✔	–	–
3	Antony Aguirre	31	Puerto Peñasco, Sonora	"Directo al corazón"	–	–	–	–
4	Karla López	29	Playa del Carmen, Quintana Roo	"Qué ganas de no verte nunca más	–	–	✔	–
5	Alfonsina Aguirre	27	Mexico City	"Antes de Ti"	–	✔	✔	✔
6	Iván Orellana	27	Rio Rico, Arizona	"A mi manera"	✔	✔	✔	✔
7	Alexander Ponce	26	Álamo, Veracruz	"Solo tú	–	–	–	–
8	Olivia Zamudio	22	Tijuana, Baja California	"Más que amigos"	–	✔	✔	✔
9	Gloria Rodríguez	28	Guadalajara, Jalisco	"Solo con verte"	–	✔	–	✔
10	Pedro Tomás	45	Mexico City	"Te va a doler"	–	✔	–	✔
11	Daniel Loya	42	Acatlán, Veracruz	"A la antigüita"	–	–	–	–
12	Norma Casillas	36	Tultepec, State of Mexico	"Por qué no le calas"	✔	✔	✔	✔
13	Karlo Fuentes Gasca	18	Tecámac, State of Mexico	"Pídeme"	✔	✔	✔	✔
14	Mónica González	30	Ciudad Acuña, Coahuila	"La mejor versión de mi"	–	✔	–	✔
15	Dylan González	24	Westminster, California	"Qué me vas a dar"	–	–	–	–
16	Rafhael Ruiz	33	Tijuana, Baja California	"Grenade"	✔	✔	✘	✔
17	Néstor Salas	34	Puebla, Puebla	"Que te olvide"	✔	–	–	✔

=== Episode 4 (June 14) ===
During the episode, Ha*Ash performed "Te Dejo en Libertad" and Yuridia performed "Amigos no por favor".

Order	Artist	Age	Hometown	Song	Coach's and artist's choices			
Order	Artist	Age	Hometown	Song	David	Yuridia	Ha*Ash	Joss
1	Jorge Valenzuela	30	Mexicali, Baja California	"Llegaste tú"	✔	–	✔	–
2	Adilene Corral	22	Navojoa, Sonora	"Te esperé"	–	–	✔	–
3	Adrián Cabrera	28	San Diego de Alejandría, Jalisco	"Rezaré"	✔	✔	✔	✔
4	Laura Padilla	31	Los Angeles, California	"ABCDEFU"	–	✔	✔	–
5	Maret Galván	23	Cancún, Quintana Roo	"Respirar"	–	–	–	–
6	Yosvani Gómez	46	Villahermosa, Tabasco	"Hazme Olvidarla"	✔	–	–	✔
7	Mo-Wung Kang	24	Tampico, Tamaulipas	"Cómo"	–	–	–	✔
8	Pamela Oscos	25	State of Mexico	"Rock You Like a Hurricane"	–	✔	–	✔
9	Marisol Hernández	27	Chihuahua, Chihuahua	"El amor de mi vida"	✔	✔	–	✔
10	Mait Cabanillas	25	Hermosillo, Sonora	"In da Getto"	–	–	–	–
11	Nora Jiménez	53	Puebla, Puebla	"O mio babbino caro"	✔	–	✔	–
12	Eber Hernández	20	Cancún, Quintana Roo	"Hawái"	–	✔	–	–
13	Fátima Elizondo	17	Monterrey, Nuevo León	"Cuando yo quería ser grande"	✔	✔	✔	✔
14	Wendy D'esezarte	29	Xalapa, Veracruz	"Llegaste tú"	–	–	–	–
15	Dueto Rocé	36 & 34	Chihuahua, Chihuahua	"El destino"	✔	✔	✔	✔
16	José María Ortega	21	State of Mexico	"Tocando fondo"	✔	✔	✔	✔
17	Christian Verástegui	33	Monterrey, Nuevo León	"No hace falta"	–	–	–	–
18	Gloria Delgado	36	Bacalar, Quintana Roo	"Loca"	✔	✔	✔	✔

=== Episode 5 (June 20) ===
During the episode, Ha*Ash performed "Lo aprendí de ti" and Yuridia performed "La duda".

Order	Artist	Age	Hometown	Song	Coach's and artist's choices			
Order	Artist	Age	Hometown	Song	David	Yuridia	Ha*Ash	Joss
1	Gabriel García	26	Chihuahua, Chihuahua	"Mi vida eres tú"	✔	✔	✔	✘
2	Alan Cisneros	28	Puebla, Puebla	"Vivir así es morir de amor"	–	–	✔	–
3	Verónica González	42	Guadalajara, Jalisco	"Entiende que ya"	–	–	–	–
4	Denisse Castellanos	30	Guadalajara, Jalisco	"Una vez más"	–	✔	–	✔
5	Marlen Ramón	30	Boca del Río, Veracruz	"Mi amante amigo"	✔	✘	✔	✔
6	Ulises Ronces	23	Taxco, Guerrero	"Ya te perdí la fé"	✔	–	–	–
7	Carlos Mendiola	20	Ciudad Hidalgo, Michoacán	"Azul"	–	✔	–	–
8	Adriana Moroyoqui	33	Hermosillo, Sonora	"Háblame de ti"	✔	–	–	✔
9	Luis Máximo	21	Toluca, State of Mexico	"Amante del amor"	✔	✔	✔	✔
10	Mariana Rico	31	Tijuana, Baja California	"Mírame"	–	–	–	–
11	Melanie Márquez	21	Chihuahua, Chihuahua	"Ex's & Oh's"	–	✔	✔	–
12	Paty & Alisson	34 & 40	Monterrey, Nuevo León	"Amor de tres"	✔	✔	✔	✘
13	Dannia Salazar	20	Guaymas, Sonora	"Vas a quedarte"	–	✔	✔	✔
14	Blanca Estela Pavón	48	Córdoba, Veracruz	"Acaríciame"	✔	–	–	–
15	Lari Panini	20	State of Mexico	"Hopelessly Devoted to You"	–	✔	✔	–
16	Yudith Ascensio	40	Los Cabos, Baja California	"Diferentes"	✔	✔	✔	✔
17	Beatriz Ortega	32	Mexico City	"Don't Speak"	–	–	–	✔
18	Anyelique Solorio	15	Mexicali, Baja California	"Por lo que reste de vida"	–	✔	–	✔

=== Episode 6 (June 21) ===
During the episode, David Bisbal performed "El Ruido" and Ha*Ash performed "Estés Donde Estés".

Order	Artist	Age	Hometown	Song	Coach's and artist's choices			
Order	Artist	Age	Hometown	Song	David	Yuridia	Ha*Ash	Joss
1	Michelle Aspetia	19	Guadalajara, Jalisco	"Good 4 U"	✔	✔	✔	✔
2	Richard Figueroa	33	Montevideo, Uruguay	"El Hubiera No Existe"	✔	–	–	–
3	Ernesto Tapia	23	Culiacán, Sinaloa	"Niña de mi Corazón"	–	✔	–	✔
4	Jessica Miranda	29	Mexico City	"Por Primera Vez"	–	–	–	–
5	Patricia Chávez	17	Ciudad Obregón, Sonora	"Drivers License"	–	✔	✘	✔
6	Elisa Torres	24	Puebla, Puebla	"Me Va a Extrañar"	✔	✔	✔	✔
7	Ivan Flores	40	Torreón, Coahuila	"Have You Ever Seen the Rain?"	–	–	✔	–
8	Isabela Rodriguez	15	Monterrey, Nuevo León	"Amor Ordinario"	–	✔	–	–
9	Vicente Rodriguez	25	Mazatlán, Sinaloa	"Castillo Azul"	✔	✔	✔	✔
10	Paola Chávez	23	Chihuahua, Chihuahua	"Ámame Una Vez Más"	–	–	✔	–
11	Angelina Castro	21	Monterrey, Nuevo León	"Nuestra Canción"	–	–	–	–
12	Aeda Fernanda	15	Mérida, Yucatán	"Tanto"	✔	✔	✔	✔
13	Erik Medrano	24	Chihuahua, Chihuahua	"Nace Un Borracho"	✔	✔	✔	✔
14	Rafael Durán	32	Puerto Peñasco, Sonora	"Perdóname"	✔	✔	✔	✔
15	Mauricio Villanueva	42	Saint Louis, Missouri	"You Raise Me Up"	✔	–	✔	–
16	Jorge Mayorga	26	Guadalajara, Jalisco	"Para Empezar"	✔	✔	✘	✔
17	Elisa Elizondo	29	Monterrey, Nuevo León	"La Cara Bonita"	–	–	✔	–
18	Juan P. Valdés	17	Los Mochis, Sinaloa	"Quiero Que Vuelvas"	–	✔	–	✔

=== Episode 7 (June 27) ===
During the episode, Joss Favela performed "Egoista" and Yuridia performed "Te equivocaste".

Order	Artist	Age	Hometown	Song	Coach's and artist's choices			
Order	Artist	Age	Hometown	Song	David	Yuridia	Ha*Ash	Joss
1	Angelina Pipper	21	Mexico City	"Side to Side"	✔	–	–	–
2	Naomi Moreno	28	Córdoba, Veracruz	"Empiezo a Recordarte"	–	✔	✔	✔
3	Alfonso Valadez	32	Ciudad Madero, Tamaulipas	"Lo siento mi amor"	–	–	–	–
4	Joel Anaya	30	San Juan del Río, Querétaro	"Sólo Déjate Amar"	✔	✔	–	–
5	Johana Angulo	34	San Luis Río Colorado, Sonora	"Ain't No Way"	✔	✔	✔	✔
6	Jana Adame	19	Pátzcuaro, Michoacán	"El hombre que yo amo"	✔	✔	–	–
7	Thania Pasión	16	Medellín, Veracruz	"Si Voy a Perderte"	–	–	–	–
8	Alexander Castillo	31	Tuxtla Gutiérrez, Chiapas	"Voy a Olvidarte"	✔	✔	✔	✔
9	Anibal Fernández	33	Guaymas, Sonora	"Gracias Por Tu Amor"	✔	–	✔	–
10	Erika Guerrero	19	Guadalajara, Jalisco	"Aléjate de mí"	✔	–	✔	–
11	Sara Rodríguez	24	Cancún, Quintana Roo	"Funeral"	–	–	–	✔
12	Johana Torres	15	Paraíso, Tabasco	"Oye"	✔	✔	✔	✔
13	Verónica de la Tejera	22	Poza Rica, Veracruz	"You and I"	✘	✔	✔	✔
14	IL Triunfo	19, 21, 22	Mexico State	"Aquí Estoy Yo"	–	–	–	–
15	José A. Miranda	31	Hermosillo, Sonora	"Sin Miedo a Nada"	–	✔	–	✔
16	Christian Valdés	39	Mazatlán, Sinaloa	"Estoy Aquí"	✔	✔	✔	✔
17	Francisco Ibarra	24	Guaymas, Sonora	"Si Me Dejas Ahora"	✔	–	✔	–
18	María Fernanda Medina	22	Metepec, Mexico State	"Se te olvidó"	–	✔	✔	–
19	Naomi Castelán	21	Poza Rica, Veracruz	"One and Only"	✔	✘	–	✔

=== Episode 8 (June 28) ===
During the episode, David Bisbal performed "Mi Princesa" and Ha*Ash performed "¿Qué Hago Yo?".

Order	Artist	Age	Hometown	Song	Coach's and artist's choices			
Order	Artist	Age	Hometown	Song	David	Yuridia	Ha*Ash	Joss
1	Yeudim Guerrero	26	Guadalajara, Jalisco	"Déjame Ir"	–	✔	✔	–
2	Iván Loga	32	Guadalajara, Jalisco	"Vuelve"	–	✔	–	–
3	Kathia Alejandra	26	Mexico State	"Bleeding Love"	✔	–	✔	–
4	Arely Rangel	43	Ciudad Valles, San Luis Potosí	"Que Bello"	✔	–	–	–
5	Darvelio Ramos	23	Teapa, Tabasco	"Si Tu Amor No Vuelve"	–	–	✔	✔
6	María Goretti	18	Guadalajara, Jalisco	"Tú"	✔	✔	✔	–
7	Mario Romero	38	Santiago Papasquiaro, Durango	"A Dónde Vamos a Parar"	–	–	–	–
8	Olga Thomas	38	Miami, Florida	"Havana"	✔	✔	✔	✔
9	Grecia Gamboa	24	Villahermosa, Tabasco	"Blanco y Negro"	✔	–	–	–
10	Luis Alvarado	37	Chihuahua, Chihuahua	"Stay with Me"	✔	✘	✔	✔
11	Getsemani Guzmán	27	Guadalajara, Jalisco	"Señor Amante"	✔	✔	✔	–
12	Andrés Alejandro	29	Torreón, Coahuila	"Si Tu Supieras"	–	–	–	–
13	Dana Robles	19	Navojoa, Sonora	"Como una ola"	✔	✔	–	✘
14	Sandra Guevara	36	Guadalajara, Jalisco	"Si No Te Gusta Como Soy"	✔	✔	✔	✔
15	Reyna Fierro	37	Veracruz, Veracruz	"Corazón Partío"	✔	✔	✔	✔
16	Diana Antunez	30	Nogales, Sonora	"Él Era Perfecto"	✔	–	–	✔
17	Brandon Parra	21	Nuevo Laredo, Tamaulipas	"Don't Stop Believin'"	✘	✔	✔	✔
18	Diana Lara	23	Morelia, Michoacán	"Invéntame	–	✔	Team full	✔
19	Angel Alaniz	21	Acaponeta, Nayarit	"Si no te hubieras ido"	✔	Team full	Team full	–
20	Victoria Bracamonte	15	Monterrey, Nuevo León	"Nunca es Suficiente"	Team full	Team full	Team full	✔

== Knockouts ==
The knockouts round started July 4. Contrary to the last three seasons, each coach groups their artist into pairs. One artist of the pair will advance to the battles while other coaches can steal the loser. In this round, coaches can steal three losing artists from other coaches. Contestants who win their knockout or are stolen by another coach advance to the Battles.

Knockouts color key
Artist won the Knockout and advanced to the Battles
Artist lost the Knockout but was stolen by another coach and advanced to the Battles
Artist lost the Knockout and was eliminated
Artist voluntarily left the competition

Knockouts results
Episode	Coach	Order	Song	Winner	Losers	Song	'Steal' result			
Episode	Coach	Order	Song	Winner	Losers	Song	David	Yuridia	Ha*Ash	Joss
Episode 9 (Monday, July 4)	David	1	"Procuro olvidarte"	Paloma Munguía	Eri Garza	"Prefiero ser su amante"	N/A	—	—	—
Episode 9 (Monday, July 4)	Ha*Ash	2	"The House of the Rising Sun"	Brandon Parra	Kathia Alejandra	"Ese beso"	—	—	N/A	—
Episode 9 (Monday, July 4)	Yuridia	3	"Mi enemigo el amor"	José Antonio Miranda	Eber Hernández	"Sigo extrañándote"	—	N/A	—	—
Episode 9 (Monday, July 4)	Joss	4	"Aunque sea en otra vida"	Aeda Fernanda	Gloria Rodríguez	"Hoy"	—	—	—	N/A
Episode 9 (Monday, July 4)	Ha*Ash	5	"Tormento"	Verónica De La Tejera	Dannia Salazar	"La llamada"	—	—	N/A	—
Episode 9 (Monday, July 4)	David	6	"El poder del amor"	Marielys Basulto	Yosvani Gómez	"Yo no sé mañana"	N/A	—	—	—
Episode 9 (Monday, July 4)	Ha*Ash	7	"Tú si sabes quererme"	Olivia Zamudio	Alexander Castillo	"Esta ausencia"	—	—	N/A	—
Episode 9 (Monday, July 4)	Yuridia	8	"Vuélveme a querer"	Dueto Rocé	Pedro Tomás Cepeda	"Amada amante"	—	N/A	—	—
Episode 9 (Monday, July 4)	Joss	9	"Maldito sea tu amor"	Sandra Guevara	César Valderrama	"Te olvidé"	—	✔	—	N/A
Episode 9 (Monday, July 4)	David	10	"No importa la distancia"	Nando Fortanell	Jorge Mayorga	"Saturno"	N/A	—	✔	—
Episode 9 (Monday, July 4)	Joss	11	"El amor después del amor"	Christian Valdés	Javier Doñates	"No lo beses"	—	—	—	N/A
Episode 9 (Monday, July 4)	David	12	"Thinking Out Loud"	Rafhael Ruiz	María Vera	"Todo Cambió"	N/A	✔	—	✔
Episode 9 (Monday, July 4)	Yuridia	13	"Prefiero ser la otra"	Getsemani Guzmán	Mónica González	"Inolvidable"	—	N/A	—	—
Episode 9 (Monday, July 4)	Ha*Ash	14	"Puño de diamantes"	Adilene Corral	Erika Guerrero	"Historia de un Amor"	—	—	N/A	—
Episode 9 (Monday, July 4)	Joss	15	"Que sepan todos"	Ernesto Tapia	Karlo Fuentes Gasca	"24 horas"	—	✔	✔	N/A
Episode 10 (Tuesday, July 5)	Yuridia	1	"Mi Reflejo"	Johana Torres	Anyelique Solorio	"Un nuevo amor"	✔	Team full	✔	—
Episode 10 (Tuesday, July 5)	Ha*Ash	2	"Ya no vives en mi"	Astrid & Valentina	Elisa Elizondo	"Fruta prohibida"	—	Team full	N/A	—
Episode 10 (Tuesday, July 5)	Joss	3	"Otra noche"	Naomi Castelán	Sara Rodríguez	"Perdóname"	—	Team full	—	N/A
Episode 10 (Tuesday, July 5)	Ha*Ash	4	"Volverte a Amar"	María Fernanda Medina	Javier Manente	"Yo quería"	—	Team full	N/A	—
Episode 10 (Tuesday, July 5)	Yuridia	5	"Somos Nada"	Dania Gónzalez	Iván Orellana	"Caballero"	✔	Team full	✔	—
Episode 10 (Tuesday, July 5)	David	6	"Writing's on the Wall"	José María Ortega	Grecia Gamboa	"Dudas"	N/A	Team full	—	—
Episode 10 (Tuesday, July 5)	Joss	7	"Qué será de ti"	Yudith Ascensio	Anisley Rodríguez	"Solamente una vez"	—	Team full	—	N/A
Episode 10 (Tuesday, July 5)	Yuridia	8	"Tacones rojos"	Mauricio Montes de Oca	Denisse Castellanos	"Eres"	—	Team full	—	—
Episode 10 (Tuesday, July 5)	Ha*Ash	9	"Anyone"	Adrianna Foster	Mauricio Villanueva	"Júrame"	—	Team full	N/A	✔
Episode 10 (Tuesday, July 5)	Yuridia	10	"La muerte del palomo"	Fátima Elizondo	Diana Lara	"No puedo olvidarlo"	—	Team full	—	—
Episode 10 (Tuesday, July 5)	Joss	11	"Mil heridas"	Rafael Durán	Daniel Loredo	"A chillar a otra parte"	—	Team full	—	N/A
Episode 10 (Tuesday, July 5)	David	12	"Borracho de amor"	Aníbal Fernández	Francisco Ibarra	"Te sigo amando"	N/A	Team full	—	—
Episode 10 (Tuesday, July 5)	Joss	13	"A Natural Woman"	Daniela Treviño	Alfonsina Aguirre	"Black Horse and the Cherry Tree"	✔	Team full	✔	N/A
Episode 10 (Tuesday, July 5)	Ha*Ash	14	"Earned It"	Luis Alvarado	Jorge Valenzuela	"Propuesta Indecente"	—	Team full	Team full	—
Episode 10 (Tuesday, July 5)	David	15	"Invencible"	Karina Villaseñor	Nora Jiménez	"Cien Años"	N/A	Team full	Team full	—
Episode 11 (Monday, July 11)	Ha*Ash	1	"De qué te vale fingir"	Lari Panini	Melanie Márquez	"La soledad"	—	Team full	Team full	—
Episode 11 (Monday, July 11)	David	2	"Mi eterno amor secreto"	Gabriel García	Richard Figueroa	"Volcán"	N/A	Team full	Team full	—
Episode 11 (Monday, July 11)	Yuridia	3	"Amar y vivir"	Reyna Bosquez	Leididiana Mayorquín	"Amor eterno"	—	Team full	Team full	—
Episode 11 (Monday, July 11)	Joss	4	"Quiero perderme en tu cuerpo"	Néstor Salas	Johana Angulo	"Mírame"	—	Team full	Team full	N/A
Episode 11 (Monday, July 11)	Ha*Ash	5	"Te vi venir"	Paola Chávez	Jahn y Gabriela Corral	"Dónde está el amor"	—	Team full	Team full	—
Episode 11 (Monday, July 11)	Joss	6	"De mí enamórate"	Naomi Moreno	Marlen Ramón	"No me vuelvo a enamorar"	—	Team full	Team full	N/A
Episode 11 (Monday, July 11)	Yuridia	7	"Beggin'"	Cynthia Sajaropulos	Iván Loga	"Cero"	—	Team full	Team full	—
Episode 11 (Monday, July 11)	David	8	"Como tu mujer"	Norma Casillas	Blanca Estela Pavón	"Como yo te amo"	N/A	Team full	Team full	—
Episode 11 (Monday, July 11)	Joss	9	"Tan enamorados"	Marisol Hernández	Juan Pablo Valdés	"Me dejé llevar"	—	Team full	Team full	N/A
Episode 11 (Monday, July 11)	Yuridia	10	"Mediocre"	Isabela Rodríguez	Patricia Chávez	"Tanto"	✔	Team full	Team full	—
Episode 11 (Monday, July 11)	David	11	"Mi soledad y yo"	Diana Antunez	Vicente Rodríguez	"Pídeme"	N/A	Team full	Team full	—
Episode 11 (Monday, July 11)	David	12	"Sentimientos"	Paty & Alisson	Arely Rangel	"Muy enamorada"	N/A	Team full	Team full	—
Episode 11 (Monday, July 11)	Yuridia	13	"Sin ti"	Joel Anaya	Pamela Oscos	"My Immortal"	—	Team full	Team full	—
Episode 11 (Monday, July 11)	Ha*Ash	14	"Quiero cantar"	Gloria Delgado	Iván Flores	"Addicted to Love"	—	Team full	Team full	✔
Episode 11 (Monday, July 11)	Yuridia	15	"Algo de mi"	Luis Máximo	María Goretti	"Todo no fue suficiente"	—	Team full	Team full	—
Episode 12 (Tuesday, July 12)	Joss	1	"Mi princesa"	Víctor Bermant	Victoria Bracamonte	"De los besos que te di"	—	Team full	Team full	N/A
Episode 12 (Tuesday, July 12)	David	2	"Bésame"	Eduardo Moreno	Ángel Alaniz	"Mi olvido"	N/A	Team full	Team full	—
Episode 12 (Tuesday, July 12)	Ha*Ash	3	"Casi perfecto"	Yeudim Guerrero	Karla López	"Fuera de mi vida"	—	Team full	Team full	—
Episode 12 (Tuesday, July 12)	Joss	4	"No discutamos"	Adrián Cabrera	Darvelio Ramos	"Que me digan loco"	—	Team full	Team full	N/A
Episode 12 (Tuesday, July 12)	Yuridia	5	"Aún lo amo"	Jennifer Santos	Reyna Fierro	"Remolino"	—	Team full	Team full	—
Episode 12 (Tuesday, July 12)	Ha*Ash	6	"Adiós amor"	Stephanie Trejo	Michelle Azpeitia	"Dangerous Woman"	—	Team full	Team full	—
Episode 12 (Tuesday, July 12)	Ha*Ash	7	"Llorar duele más"	Daniel Mendoza	Alan Cisneros	"Te amo"	—	Team full	Team full	—
Episode 12 (Tuesday, July 12)	David	8	"Wrecking Ball"	Angelina Pipper	Dana Robles	"Yo por él"	N/A	Team full	Team full	—
Episode 12 (Tuesday, July 12)	Joss	9	"Fuego de noche, nieve de día"	Sebastián Espejo	Beatriz Ortega	"Mi peor error"	—	Team full	Team full	N/A
Episode 12 (Tuesday, July 12)	Ha*Ash	10	"Hello"	Marcela López	Kenia Feria	"Por cobardía"	—	Team full	Team full	—
Episode 12 (Tuesday, July 12)	David	11	"Si tú me quisieras"	Pamela Cantú	Jana Adame	"Ahora entendí"	N/A	Team full	Team full	—
Episode 12 (Tuesday, July 12)	Yuridia	12	"Because of You"	Olga Thomas	Laura Padilla	"No me queda más"	—	Team full	Team full	—
Episode 12 (Tuesday, July 12)	David	13	"Cuando fuimos nada"	Elisa Torres	Ulises Ronces	"Ya no somos ni seremos"	N/A	Team full	Team full	✔
Episode 12 (Tuesday, July 12)	Joss	14	"Como han pasado los años"	Adriana Moroyoqui	Mo-Wung Kang	"Almohada"	—	Team full	Team full	Team full
Episode 12 (Tuesday, July 12)	Yuridia	15	"Me estoy enamorando"	Erick Medrano	Carlos Mendiola	"Lo que no fue, no será"	✔	Team full	Team full	Team full

Non-competition performances
Order	Performers	Song
9.1	Paty Cantú & David Bisbal	"No Fue Suficiente"
10.1	María José	"Me quedo aquí abajo"
11.1	Joss Favela	"¿Por qué no te enamoras?"
12.1	David Bisbal	"Es complicado"

== Battles ==
The battles round started July 18. In this round, coaches can steal three losing artists from other coaches. Contestants who win their battle or are stolen by another coach advance to the Top 3 round.

Battles color key
Artist won the Battle and advanced to the Top 3
Artist lost the Battle but was stolen by another coach and advanced to the Top 3
Artist lost the Battle and was eliminated

Episode	Coach	Order	Winner	Song	Loser	'Steal' result			
Episode	Coach	Order	Winner	Song	Loser	David	Yuridia	Ha*Ash	Joss
Episode 13 (Monday, July 18, 2022)	David	1	Patricia Chávez	"Contigo sí"	Eduardo Moreno	N/A	—	—	—
Episode 13 (Monday, July 18, 2022)	Ha*Ash	2	Luis Alvarado	"No me quiero enamorar"	Olivia Zamudio	—	—	N/A	—
Episode 13 (Monday, July 18, 2022)	Yuridia	3	Cynthia Sajaropulos	"Somebody to Love"	Getsemani Guzmán	—	N/A	—	—
Episode 13 (Monday, July 18, 2022)	Joss	4	Adrián Cabrera	"Perdón"	Mauricio Villanueva	✔	—	—	N/A
Episode 13 (Monday, July 18, 2022)	Ha*Ash	5	Adrianna Foster	"Hábito de ti"	Paola Chávez	—	—	N/A	—
Episode 13 (Monday, July 18, 2022)	Yuridia	6	Mauricio Montes de Oca	"El lobby"	Joel Anaya	—	N/A	✔	—
Episode 13 (Monday, July 18, 2022)	Ha*Ash	7	Brandon Parra	"Someone You Loved"	Lari Panini	—	—	N/A	—
Episode 13 (Monday, July 18, 2022)	David	8	Marielys Basulto	"Mi mayor venganza"	Paloma Munguía	N/A	—	—	—
Episode 13 (Monday, July 18, 2022)	Joss	9	Aeda Fernanda	"Hasta que te conocí"	Víctor Bermant	✔	✔	✔	N/A
Episode 13 (Monday, July 18, 2022)	David	10	Nando Fortanell	"Love on the Brain"	Rafhael Ruíz	N/A	—	✔	—
Episode 13 (Monday, July 18, 2022)	Yuridia	11	Reyna Bosquez	"Cómo sufro"	José Antonio Miranda	—	N/A	—	—
Episode 13 (Monday, July 18, 2022)	Joss	12	Marisol Hernández	"Como lo hice yo"	Ernesto Tapia	—	✔	—	N/A
Episode 14 (Tuesday, July 19, 2022)	Joss	1	Christian Valdés	"Don't Let Me Down"	Iván Flores	—	—	—	N/A
Episode 14 (Tuesday, July 19, 2022)	David	2	Paty & Alisson	"Me muero"	Norma Casillas	N/A	—	—	—
Episode 14 (Tuesday, July 19, 2022)	Ha*Ash	3	Stephanie Trejo	"Convénceme"	Adilene Corral	—	—	N/A	—
Episode 14 (Tuesday, July 19, 2022)	Yuridia	4	Karlo Fuentes Gasca	"Desesperado"	Luis Máximo	✔	N/A	✔	✔
Episode 14 (Tuesday, July 19, 2022)	Ha*Ash	5	Astrid & Valentina	"El cascabel"	Iván Orellana	—	—	N/A	—
Episode 14 (Tuesday, July 19, 2022)	Yuridia	6	Fátima Elizondo	"Amor de los dos"	César Valderrama	✔	N/A	—	—
Episode 14 (Tuesday, July 19, 2022)	Joss	7	Daniela Treviño	"Si no te hubiera conocido"	Sebastián Espejo	Team full	—	—	N/A
Episode 14 (Tuesday, July 19, 2022)	David	8	José María Ortega	"Señorita"	Angelina Pipper	Team full	—	—	—
Episode 14 (Tuesday, July 19, 2022)	Yuridia	9	Dania González	"Por eso te amo"	Johana Torres	Team full	N/A	✔	✔
Episode 14 (Tuesday, July 19, 2022)	Joss	10	Yudith Ascencio	"Fue un placer conocerte"	Ulises Ronces	Team full	—	—	N/A
Episode 14 (Tuesday, July 19, 2022)	David	11	Gabriel García	"Yo te prefiero a ti"	Karina Villaseñor	Team full	—	—	—
Episode 14 (Tuesday, July 19, 2022)	Yuridia	12	Olga Thomas	"Ámame o déjame"	Erik Medrano	Team full	N/A	—	—
Episode 14 (Tuesday, July 19, 2022)	Ha*Ash	13	Jorge Mayorga	"A gritos de esperanza"	Daniel Mendoza	Team full	—	N/A	—
Episode 15 (Monday, July 25, 2022)	David	1	Elisa Torres	"Una mentira más"	Diana Antunez	Team full	—	—	—
Episode 15 (Monday, July 25, 2022)	Ha*Ash	2	Marcela López	"You Know I'm No Good"	Gloria Delgado	Team full	—	N/A	—
Episode 15 (Monday, July 25, 2022)	Joss	3	Naomi Castelán	"Se me va a quemar el corazón"	Rafel Durán	Team full	—	—	N/A
Episode 15 (Monday, July 25, 2022)	Ha*Ash	4	María Fernanda Medina	"(Todo lo que hago) Lo hago por ti"	Alfonsina Aguirre	Team full	—	N/A	✔
Episode 15 (Monday, July 25, 2022)	David	5	Anibal Fernández	"La sinvergüenza"	Carlos Mendiola	Team full	—	—	—
Episode 15 (Monday, July 25, 2022)	Joss	6	Adriana Moroyoqui	"¿Cómo pagarte?"	Néstor Salas	Team full	—	—	N/A
Episode 15 (Monday, July 25, 2022)	Yuridia	7	Jennifer Santos	"Tan sólo tú"	Dueto Rocé	Team full	N/A	—	—
Episode 15 (Monday, July 25, 2022)	Joss	8	Sandra Guevara	"Engañémoslo"	Naomi Moreno	Team full	✔	✔	N/A
Episode 15 (Monday, July 25, 2022)	Yuridia	9	Isabela Rodríguez	"Crazy"	María Vera	Team full	Team full	✔	✔
Episode 15 (Monday, July 25, 2022)	Ha*Ash	10	Verónica de la Tejera	"Mientes"	Yeudim Guerrero	Team full	Team full	N/A	Team full
Episode 15 (Monday, July 25, 2022)	David	11	Anyelique Solorio	"Cuando un hombre te enamora"	Pamela Cantú	Team full	Team full	✔	Team full

Non-competition performances
Order	Performers	Song
13.1	Ha*Ash & Yuridia	"Perdón, perdón"
14.1	David Bisbal & Joss Favela	"Dígale"
15.1	Virlán García	"Hoy voy a olvidarte"
15.2	Joss Favela & Ha*Ash	"La mejor versión de mí"
15.3	Yuridia & Banda MS	"¿Y qué tal si funciona?"

== Top 3 ==
The Top 3 round started on August 1. Contrary to the previous three seasons, each coach had to make three groups of four artists from their team to compete during a span of 3 episodes. At the end of all four performances, the coach could only advance with one of the artists to form the Top 3. At the end of this round, the artist chosen in each episode, advanced into the Semifinal.

Knockouts color key
Artist was chosen as Top 3 and advanced to the Semifinal
Artist was not chosen as Top 3 and was eliminated

Episode	Coach	Order	Artist	Song	Result
Episode 16 (Monday, August 1)	Yuridia	1	Mauricio Montes De Oca	"Me rehúso"	Eliminated
Episode 16 (Monday, August 1)	Yuridia	2	Reyna Bosquez	"Que nadie sepa mi sufrir"	Eliminated
Episode 16 (Monday, August 1)	Yuridia	3	Ernesto Tapia	"La llamada de mi ex"	Eliminated
Episode 16 (Monday, August 1)	Yuridia	4	Fátima Elizondo	"Tata Dios"	Yuridia's choice
Episode 16 (Monday, August 1)	Ha*Ash	5	Astrid & Valentina	"Tu sangre en mi cuerpo"	Eliminated
Episode 16 (Monday, August 1)	Ha*Ash	6	Luis Alvarado	"No desaparecerá"	Eliminated
Episode 16 (Monday, August 1)	Ha*Ash	7	Pamela Cantú	"Say Something"	Eliminated
Episode 16 (Monday, August 1)	Ha*Ash	8	Adrianna Foster	"Abrázame muy fuerte"	Ha*Ash's choice
Episode 16 (Monday, August 1)	Joss	9	Christian Valdés	"Me río de ti"	Joss's choice
Episode 16 (Monday, August 1)	Joss	10	Adriana Moroyoqui	"El color de tus ojos"	Eliminated
Episode 16 (Monday, August 1)	Joss	11	Yudith Ascensio	"Quiero amanecer con alguien"	Eliminated
Episode 16 (Monday, August 1)	Joss	12	María Vera	"Pa' ti no estoy"	Eliminated
Episode 16 (Monday, August 1)	David	13	Paty & Allison	"Amiga mía"	Eliminated
Episode 16 (Monday, August 1)	David	14	Luis Máximo	"Déjame llorar"	Eliminated
Episode 16 (Monday, August 1)	David	15	Anyelique Solorio	"Dueles"	David's choice
Episode 16 (Monday, August 1)	David	16	Nando Fortanell	"Volver a amar"	Eliminated
Episode 17 (Monday, August 8)	Joss	1	Alfonsina Aguirre	"Amarte duele"	Eliminated
Episode 17 (Monday, August 8)	Joss	2	Aeda Fernanda	"La nave del olvido"	Joss's choice
Episode 17 (Monday, August 8)	Joss	3	Naomi Castelán	"Amorfoda"	Eliminated
Episode 17 (Monday, August 8)	Joss	4	Johana Torres	"Angel"	Eliminated
Episode 17 (Monday, August 8)	Ha*Ash	5	Joel Anaya	"Bajo el agua"	Eliminated
Episode 17 (Monday, August 8)	Ha*Ash	6	María Fernanda Medina	"Pero me acuerdo de ti"	Eliminated
Episode 17 (Monday, August 8)	Ha*Ash	7	Rafhael Ruiz	"Darte un beso"	Eliminated
Episode 17 (Monday, August 8)	Ha*Ash	8	Marcela López	"Sueña"	Ha*Ash's choice
Episode 17 (Monday, August 8)	David	9	Aníbal Fernández	"Por si no recuerdas"	Eliminated
Episode 17 (Monday, August 8)	David	10	Marielys Basulto	"La loca"	Eliminated
Episode 17 (Monday, August 8)	David	11	Gabriel García	"Y volveré"	David's choice
Episode 17 (Monday, August 8)	David	12	Mauricio Villanueva	"Bésame mucho"	Eliminated
Episode 17 (Monday, August 8)	Yuridia	13	Isabela Rodríguez	"Lonely"	Yuridia's choice
Episode 17 (Monday, August 8)	Yuridia	14	Karlo Fuentes Gasca	"Ámame"	Eliminated
Episode 17 (Monday, August 8)	Yuridia	15	Olga Thomas	"Tu voz"	Eliminated
Episode 17 (Monday, August 8)	Yuridia	16	Cynthia Sajaropulos	"Desátame"	Eliminated
Episode 18 (Monday, August 15)	Ha*Ash	1	Verónica de la Tejera	"What's Up?"	Eliminated
Episode 18 (Monday, August 15)	Ha*Ash	2	Jorge Mayorga	"Doy un paso atrás"	Eliminated
Episode 18 (Monday, August 15)	Ha*Ash	3	Stephanie Trejo	"Culpable o inocente"	Eliminated
Episode 18 (Monday, August 15)	Ha*Ash	4	Brandon Parra	"How Am I Supposed to Live Without You"	Ha*Ash's choice
Episode 18 (Monday, August 15)	Yuridia	5	Dania González	"En cambio no"	Eliminated
Episode 18 (Monday, August 15)	Yuridia	6	Víctor Bermant	"Aunque ahora estés con él"	Eliminated
Episode 18 (Monday, August 15)	Yuridia	7	Jennifer Santos	"Castillos"	Yuridia's choice
Episode 18 (Monday, August 15)	Yuridia	8	Naomi Moreno	"A que no le cuentas"	Eliminated
Episode 18 (Monday, August 15)	Joss	9	Marisol Hernández	"Me cuesta tanto olvidarte"	Eliminated
Episode 18 (Monday, August 15)	Joss	10	Sandra Guevara	"Haz lo que quieras"	Joss's choice
Episode 18 (Monday, August 15)	Joss	11	Daniela Treviño	"Someone like You"	Eliminated
Episode 18 (Monday, August 15)	Joss	12	Adrián Cabrera	"Payaso"	Eliminated
Episode 18 (Monday, August 15)	David	13	Elisa Torres	"Probablemente"	Eliminated
Episode 18 (Monday, August 15)	David	14	César Valderrama	"Esclavo y amo"	Eliminated
Episode 18 (Monday, August 15)	David	15	Patricia Chávez	"Hoy ya me voy"	Eliminated
Episode 18 (Monday, August 15)	David	16	José María Ortega	"Feeling Good"	David's choice

Non-competition performances
Order	Performers	Song
16.1	Yuridia & Joss Favela	"Alma enamorada"
16.2	David Bisbal & María José	"Esta ausencia"
17.1	Ha*Ash & David Bisbal	"Supongo que lo sabes"
18.1	Yuridia & David Bisbal	"Ángel"

== Final phase ==
Final phase color key
Artist was saved by his/her coach
Artist was eliminated

=== Day 1: Semifinal (August 22) ===
In the Semifinal, the twelve remaining participants performed in order to become one of their coach's choice to advance into the Finale. Each coach advanced with two artists, with the third member being eliminated.

Episode 19
Order	Coach	Artist	Song	Result
1	Joss	Sandra Guevara	"Nube viajera"	Joss's choice
2	Ha*Ash	Marcela López	"Libre soy"	Ha*Ash's choice
3	Yuridia	Isabela Rodríguez	"Creo en ti"	Yuridia's choice
4	David	José María Ortega	"Regresa a mi"	Eliminated
5	Yuridia	Fátima Elizondo	"Paloma negra"	Yuridia's choice
6	David	Gabriel García	"Y, ¿Si fuera ella?"	David's choice
7	Joss	Aeda Fernanda	"Así fue"	Eliminated
8	Ha*Ash	Adrianna Foster	"Pienso en ti"	Ha*Ash's choice
9	David	Anyelique Solorio	"Detrás de mi ventana"	David's choice
10	Yuridia	Jennifer Santos	"Si yo fuera un chico"	Eliminated
11	Ha*Ash	Brandon Parra	"Believe"	Eliminated
12	Joss	Christian Valdés	"Perdón"	Joss's choice

=== Day 2: Finale (August 29) ===
The Finale was prerecorded. In the first round, the participants sang a solo song. Following those performances, each coach had to choose one artist to advance to the second round. In the second round, the four finalists performed a duet with their coach. The show's production shot four different winning results (one per finalist), but only the chosen winner by the public at home one was shown on TV.

==== First round ====
Episode 20
Order	Coach	Artist	Song	Result
1	Ha*Ash	Adrianna Foster	"Amar y querer"	Eliminated
2	Joss	Christian Valdés	"Como yo nadie te he amado"	Eliminated
3	David	Anyelique Solorio	"Mi todo"	David's choice
4	Yuridia	Isabela Rodríguez	"Idontwannabeyouanymore"	Eliminated
5	Ha*Ash	Marcela López	"Quédate conmigo"	Ha*Ash's choice
6	Joss	Sandra Guevara	"La gran señora"	Joss' choice
7	David	Gabriel García	"Dueño de nada"	Eliminated
8	Yuridia	Fátima Elizondo	"Desaires"	Yuridia's choice

==== Second round ====
Coach	Artist	Order	Audition Song	Order	Duet Song (with Coach)	Result
Joss Favela	Sandra Guevara	1	"Si No Te Gusta Como Soy"	8	"Mi Ego"	Fourth place
Yuridia	Fátima Elizondo	2	"Cuando Yo Queria Ser Grande"	5	"¿Con Qué Se Pega un Corazón?"	Winner
Ha*Ash	Marcela López	3	"Así soy"	7	"Lo Que un Hombre Debería Saber"	Third place
David Bisbal	Anyelique Solorio	4	"Por Lo Que Reste De Vida"	6	"Probablemente"	Runner-up

Non-competition performances
Order	Performers	Song
20.1	Joss Favela & Banda MS	"¿Quién Pierde Más?"
20.2	Yuridia & Eden Muñoz	"Me Hace Tanto Bien"
20.3	David Bisbal & María José	"Lo Que Tenías Conmigo"
20.4	Ha*Ash & Kenia Os	"Mi Salida Contigo"

== Elimination chart ==
=== Color key ===
Artist's info

- Team David
- Team Yuridia
- Team Ha*Ash
- Team Joss

Result details

- Winner
- Runner-up
- Third place
- Fourth place
- Saved by his/her coach
- Eliminated

Final phase results per week
Artists	Semifinal	Finale	
Artists	Semifinal	Round 1	Round 2
Fátima Elizondo	Safe	Safe	Winner
Anyelique Solorio	Safe	Safe	Runner-up
Marcela López	Safe	Safe	Third place
Sandra Guevara	Safe	Safe	Fourth place
Adrianna Foster	Safe	Eliminated	Eliminated (Finale)
Gabriel García	Safe	Eliminated	Eliminated (Finale)
Isabela Rodríguez	Safe	Eliminated	Eliminated (Finale)
Christian Valdés	Safe	Eliminated	Eliminated (Finale)
José María Ortega	Eliminated	Eliminated (Semifinal)	
Aeda Fernanda	Eliminated	Eliminated (Semifinal)	
Jennifer Santos	Eliminated	Eliminated (Semifinal)	
Brandon Parra	Eliminated	Eliminated (Semifinal)	

== Artists who appeared on other shows or in previous seasons ==
- Adrianna Foster participated in the first season of La Voz U.S. on team Guzmán.
- Sebastián Espejo auditioned in the ninth season, but failed to turn any chairs.
- Dania González participated in La Apuesta on team Pepe Aguilar and in the second season of Pequeños gigantes
- José María Ortega participated in the first season El Retador Mx
- Anyelique Solorio participated in the third season of Pequeños gigantes
- Alfonsina Aguirre participated in the second season Rojo, el color del talento.
- Joel Anaya participated in the fourth season of La Voz... México on team Ricky.
- Víctor Bermant auditioned in the first season of La Voz... Kids, but failed to turn any chairs.
