= List of Skimo episodes =

This is an episode listing for the Mexican sitcom Skimo. The comedy originally premiered on 15 May 2006.

== Series overview ==
Season	Episodes	Originally released	
Season	Episodes	First released	Last released
1	13	May 15, 2006	August 21, 2006
2	14	October 30, 2006	February 19, 2007
3	13	April 23, 2007	July 30, 2007
4	10	September 30, 2007	November 23, 2007

== Episodes ==
=== Season 1 (2006) ===
No.	Title	Original release date	Prod. code
1	"The Inspector Comes at Noon"	May 15, 2006	101
Fito and Tavo Open Skimo, and they try to keep everything in order because the health inspector is coming, but Fito loses his pet hamster, Napoleon in Skimo..
2	"None Is Fair in Love and War"	May 22, 2006	102
When a beautiful girl named Francesca comes to Skimo, Fito and Tavo compete to see who will "get the girl," but Francesa has a boyfriend.
3	"Divided We Fall"	May 29, 2006	103
Fito and Tavo have been arguing so much that they divide Skimo into two parts. But they complain because each have ingredients the other wants.
4	"Skamo v.s Skimo"	June 5, 2006	104
Fito and Tavo have a bet against the twins that involve the twins making their own joint and the most popular joint wins. But the twins make a rip-off of Skimo called Skamo which becomes more popular than Skimo, until Mucho Mucho gets Motel to come and perform at Skimo. They perform "Come To Me" from ShortSummary = Their debut album. Special Guest: Motel
5	"Fati-melodrama"	June 12, 2006	105
Fatima thinks she is being too overworked, so she quits. So Fito and Tavo have to do Fatima's job, but they realize it is too difficult and try to get Fatima back.
6	"Mad Hot Chile"	June 26, 2006	106
Fito invents a new recipe called "Fito's Super Charged Chile" and then Tavo gets jealous because Fito is the center of attention since his new recipe becomes super popular.
7	"Fito's Birthday"	July 3, 2006	107
All of Fito's friends try to throw a surprise party for Fito for his birthday, but he never gives them a chance, so Don Filemon asks Fito to take care of his ugly, annoying niece Chilindrina to keep him distracted.
8	"Maybe Baby?"	July 10, 2006	108
When Fatima and Filemon adopt a Neopet online and try to decide on its name. Fito, Tavo, Ursula, Mucho Mucho, and the twins each think Fatima and Don Filemon had a baby growing up to be just like them.
9	"Something Scary This Way Comes"	July 17, 2006	109
Mucho Mucho tells the kids the story of the "Glutton Ghost of Skimo" and they tease Fito because he is scared, so he, Tavo and Úrsula stay a night at Skino to prove there aren't any ghosts but the twins try to scare them.
10	"Roamin' Love"	July 24, 2006	110
An ex-girlfriend, who Don Filemon met in Rome, decides to come to see him. But he told many lies to her, so the kids try to make his lies seem true.
11	"Society of Deep Brightness"	August 7, 2006	111
Tavo joins the Society of Deep Brightness and he tosses all the Skimo furniture due to his new ultra-clean self, but it turns out that the Society steals all the things their members throw.
12	"They Didn't Understand"	August 14, 2006	112
Ursula is waiting for a special boy, Pablo, who she has to meet up with. Tavo gets jealous of them spending so much time together, so he and Fito pull pranks on Pablo and trick him to throw him into Skimo, but they later find out that Pablo is Ursula's cousin.
13	"Skimo's End"	August 21, 2006	113
Fito receives a prank book and pulls so many pranks that Tavo starts pranking too and it ends with Don Filemon giving no money for Skimo's repairs.

=== Season 2 (2006–07) ===
No.	Title	Original release date	Prod. code
14	"Skimo The New"	October 30, 2006	201
Skimo is about to reopen but when Tavo came he realises they only bought 3 black laptops and a Nintendo DS so they have to work super fast before Don Filemon comes and the twins try to conquer Tavo's heart.
15	"Ain't Miss Behavin'"	November 14, 2006	202
Urusula takes a test that describes her boring so she changes her personality to an attitude like the twins one, meanwhile Fito disguises herself as Ursula for a contest Tavo and her entered to win money for Skimo.
16	"Employee of the Month"	November 21, 2006	203
Fito and Tavo compete to see who is the employee of the month, while Mucho Mucho tries to cure Fatima's fear to trophies.
17	"True Love Never Did Run Smooth"	November 28, 2006	204
The twins make a love letter for Tavo from Ursula which Fito receives and while Fito tries to search for his love, Fatima makes a love potion for Tavo, and Shi falls in love with another videogame addict girl.
18	"Hang Em' High"	December 11, 2006	205
When Tavo asks Caradura's sister out, Caradura and the twins unite against Skimo, while Tavo trains(wedgies) to defeat Caradura.
19	"Were-Fito"	December 18, 2006	206
Fito thinks he'll turn into a werewolf tonight so Mucho Mucho makes all of them tell horror stories. When Don Filemon's new dog enters Skimo and Fito disappears they think the dog is Fito.
20	"A Skimo Christmas"	December 25, 2006	207
Salvador, a kid with no family, steals the star of Skimo's X-mas tree only to protect it, and then the Skimo cast do a play of the origin of Christmas but the twin's order funny disguises for the play.
21	"Arena Skimo"	January 8, 2007	208
Fito becomes obsessed with wrestling and when his favourite wrestling team comes to fight their arch-enemy "Super Fat" it turns out Fatima is Super Fat uncovered. Fatima's ex-boyfriend and arch-enemy Nitro make up in the end, realising the reason for the breakup was a misunderstanding and they decide to get married.
22	"Not So Sweet 16"	January 15, 2007	209
Ursula wants a perfect Sweet 16 but her parents ruined it, so Tavo decides to make her a perfect Sweet 16 but the twins want to ruin everything Tavo does. Jesse & Joy perform.
23	"We Built This Band On Rock n' Roll"	January 22, 2007	210
Fito and Tavo make a band called "Los Skimos Electricos" but they haven't got a singer. When they cast auditions, Kalimba shows up and is chosen to sing.
24	"Vice-Versa"	January 29, 2007	211
Fito and Tavo are convinced Mucho Mucho can't hypnotize anything, so he decides to hypnotize them, but when the twins interrupt, Tavo is in Fito's body and vice versa.
25	"French 101"	February 5, 2007	212
Fito falls in love with Nicole, the new French girl at school, and says that he needs help with French in order to be with her.
26	"Ooh, Ooh Itchy Skimo"	February 12, 2007	213
The twins free a plague of Madagascar fleas which start to bother Skimo and Mucho Mucho has to spray repellent on all the customers. Tavo's parents divorced.
27	"Goodbye Tavo"	February 19, 2007	214
After Tavo's parents divorced Tavo and his mother have to move to Aguascalientes Fito hires Tato a stupid punk boy with becomes the twin's servant but later he gets fired.

=== Season 3 (2007) ===
At the beginning of this season, the twins turn Skimo into a Japanese bar. The season premiered Monday, April 23 & Friday, April 27.

No.	Title	Original release date	Prod. code
28	"Where's Tavo?, Part 1"	April 23, 2007	301
Shi, Ursula, and Fito are going to Aguscalientes for making a visit to Tavo, but Tavo is watching his friends everywhere because he's missing them. MuchoMucho and Fatima take care of Skimo during Fito, Shi, and Ursula's absence, so, the twins make "The Skimo Guide" and it says all the things that MuchoMucho and Fatima need to do. So now Skino is called: Skimo Sushi Showbiz Planet.
29	"Where's Tavo?, Part 2"	April 30, 2007	302
Shi, Urusla, and Fito are still lost in Aguascalientes looking for Tavo, in Skimo, the twins are still making their evil plan to grow up even bigger than it began. Their sushi makes MuchoMucho and Fatima wear horrendous costumes. The twins are geishas, MuchoMucho is a samurai and Fatima is a mermaid. In Aguascalientes Ursula, Fito and Shi didn't find Tavo, but he decided to talk to his mom and come back to his friends and live with his dad.
30	"Of Surprises and Skates"	May 7, 2007	303
Fito enters on a dare to become part of "Evil Albatross Skaters" competing with the twins. (Acting as a sole person). Meanwhile, Tavo wants to trade his lucha libre mask with a cyber person called Cris. He settles a trap in case Cris wants to mug him, only to discover that Cris is really a girl. In the end, Fito quits the challenge, leaving the twins working for the "patinetos albatros".
31	"Love is Magic"	May 14, 2007	304
Tavo is in the love with a new girl called Cris, so he invites her and her best friend to Skimo for a date. Meanwhile, Ursula is really fed up with the Twins and their rudeness, so she decides to take karate classes. Then Tavo makes a presentation as Tavini, later Ursula arrives in Skimo after Tavini's Show and sees Cris and Tavo together.
32	"Mucho Mucho Is A Go Go"	May 21, 2007	305
Tavo and Fito are celebrating the 1st Anniversary of Skimo, and how they made it huge. MuchoMucho doesn't see his name on the golden plaque commemorating the 1st Anniversary of the "Coolest Place in the 'Hood". So, he decides to leave Skimo. Meanwhile, the twins are promoting their webpage called: www.supertwinies.com, when MuchoMucho leaves Skimo he stays at the place the webpage of the twins is promoted. In the end, he decides to move back to Skimo, after all the problems that happened during his absence and sees his name on the new plaque.
33	"No Lotto No"	June 4, 2007	306
The Guys are trying to win the lottery, during that while the twins are trying to steal their lottery tickets. In the end, nobody wins. Fito dreams of being a sultan, Tavo dreams of spending his money in the business, Ursula wants to be a philanthropist, MuchoMucho wants to be a rap star and Fatima wants to have a Love Machine.
34	"I Can't Take You Guys Anywhere"	June 11, 2007	307
The guys are always making the big mistake. Tavo is invited to dinner with Cris so he decides to let his friends go to the dinner and they start to ruin the date.
35	"Boy's Will Be Girls"	June 18, 2007	308
Fito and Tavo go to Cris' Ballet Classes and dress up like 2 girls that are going to the ballet class. At the end of the class, Tavo gets to close with Fulvio better known as Caradura and he tells him dressed as a girl that his most embarrassing moment was when Fito made him Chinese underwear.
36	"Oh Brother!"	June 25, 2007	309
Heicker, Tavo's brother comes to Skimo and makes the girls go crazy, he teaches Ursula how to make pizzas and Fito thinks he's the man. To recuperate Cris' Love, Tavo decides to perform a magic trick in front of everyone in Skimo, the twins made a key exchange with the real key for Tavo to escape from the magic case was the key Heicker had and the twins kept with another key that they put in place that MuchoMucho could see it. So during the act Heicker came to Tavo's aid and gave him the right key at the end and the twins get a nasty surprise.
37	"Only In Your Dreams"	July 2, 2007	310
The guys in Skimo are dreaming of being Superstars, so Heicker talks to Kudai's Manager, so at the end, the shaker gets broken and Shi and Shila make things easier for the guys, at the end Kudai sings their hit Dejame Gritar.- Special Guest: Kudai
38	"Separation Anxiety"	July 16, 2007	311
Nora and Nori decide to split up, so that makes Nori leaves for a spa far away from the town. Nori, desperate gets a call from her sister and she thinks that Nora is kidnapped, and decides to go with Ursula, Fito, Tavo, Shi, and MuchoMucho drifted to the spa to find Nora. In the end, Nori realizes that she and Nora are always going to be together as the most beautiful twins in the world.
39	"Hey, No Fair"	July 23, 2007	312
Don Filemon sends some telegrams to the guys and they read them, the telegrams told them that Don Filemon was in Africa getting an eat-a-all camel and that his new camel had eaten a poisoned snake and that the camel was sick, so they decided to make a Fair o Kermes in Spanish, to get some money and send it to Don Fliemon.
40	"Tavo's Accident"	July 30, 2007	313
The boys think that a piano fell on Tavo's head and decide to go to see him in the hospital. The situation becomes crazy when the binoculars are caught completely in empty Skimo and they begin to look for a form to leave their confinement. In the end, Tavo's piano did not fall nigún to him raises, but that Cris was sliding and estab accompanying it and Cris fell there and an arm was broken, Úrsula declares its love to him to the boy who above fell the piano to him that supposedly was Tavo and that Tavo moment it entered the room of the boy who fell a piano to him in the head and he hears everything that Úrsula says to him, the binoculars see that Fátima enters Skimo and leave Skimo of the way but fast that could do it and Fátima said that “Neither Asimile nor I understand them”. –

=== Season 4 (2007–08) ===
This season was confirmed by Daniel Tovar in one of his recent interviews. One special thing that makes this season more oriented than the others, it's because this is the longest episode run season with 17 episodes. This is the last season of the show.

No.	Title	Original release date	Prod. code
41	"Trapped!"	September 30, 2007	401
42	"Trapped!"	September 30, 2007	402
The guys are trying to make a deal with the guys of RBD. Meanwhile, the guys end up trapped with twins, at the end RBD ends singing Aun Hay Algo and then Tavo and Ursula start to look at each other.
43	"This Thing is Coming Between Us"	October 5, 2007	403
Fito makes a biology project called Fitocondria which is a green stinky thing. Tavo throws it in the bin, and they have a fight. Meanwhile, Cris thinks Tavo is with Ursula but they are only friends. When Tavo wants to apologize to Fito, Fito suggests a duel. But a sporting duel.
44	"Bring It On"	October 12, 2007	404
Continuing from where the last episode left off, Fito and Tavo have a sporting duel with the long jump, diving, disc throwing, etc. The twins are the judges and they try to give 0 to them in every category. MuchoMucho, Shila, and Shi are the announcers and the players divide into groups, Fito, Heicker, Ursula, and Fatima vs Tavo, Chris, and Deyanira. They end up in a deal and no one wins
45	"Liar Liar, Relationship on Fire"	October 19, 2007	405
MuchoMucho makes a lie detector that works with Fito. So it threatens Ursula's secret. It will be the time when Cris and Tavo get separated.
46	"Miss Skimo"	October 26, 2007	406
Tavo organaizes a beauty pageant in Skimo to settle the rivalries between the girls, Ursula and Cris enter to compete for Tavo's heart. The other contestants included Nora & Nori, Fatima, Shila, and "Natasha" who is really Deyanira. Fito and Shi are the judges, responsible for scoring and the final verdict. In the end, the winner(Ursula) rejects the crown.
47	"Fito's Inheritance"	November 2, 2007	407
Fito receives one hundred thousand dollars from his great-grandfather. He uses it to buy things for his friends, but the twins try to steal the money so Fito gives Tavo the rest. Tavo uses some of the money to buy a ring for Nitro for Fatima and Nitro's upcoming wedding.
48	"Skimo's Workshop Arts"	November 9, 2007	408
49	"Fatima's Wedding"	November 16, 2007	409
50	"Graduation"	November 23, 2007	410
