= Resistiré =

Resistiré ("I'll Resist") may refer to:

- Resistiré (Argentine TV series), 2003 Argentine telenovela
- Resistiré (Chilean TV series), a Chilean reality television series
- "Resistiré" (Dúo Dinámico song), 1988
- "Resistiré" (Erreway song), 2003
- "Resistiré México", a 2020 charity song
