= Se Desintegra El Amor =

Single by Paty Cantú feat. Benny Ibarra

from the album Afortunadamente No Eres Tú
- Released: July 21, 2011
- Recorded: 2011
- Genre: Pop
- Length: 3:31
- Label: EMI
- Songwriter: Paty Cantú

Paty Cantú singles chronology
"Goma De Mascar" (2011)	"Se Desintegra El Amor" (2011)	"Corazón Bipolar" (2012)

Benny Ibarra singles chronology
"Tu Amor" (2011)	"Se Desintegra El Amor" (2011)

Music video
- "Se Desintegra El Amor" on YouTube

"Se Desintegra El Amor" (English: "Love It decays") is the fourth single by Mexican singer Paty Cantú and the singer Benny Ibarra from her second studio album, Afortunadamente No Eres Tú, released in 2010.

== Music video ==
The video for the song was directed by Fausto Terán, and was filmed in Miami and New York City, leveraging the singer's visit to the U.S. in connection with the promotion of her studio album "Afortunadamente No Eres Tú".

== Trackslisting ==
Digital download
No.	Title	Length
1.	"Se Desintegra el Amor"	3:35

== Charts ==
Chart (2011)	Peak position
Mexican Espanol Airplay (Billboard)	7
Mexico Airplay (Billboard)	18

== Release history ==
Country	Date	Format	Label
Worldwide	April 10, 2012	Digital download	Emi Music
