= Tatiana Martínez =

Mexican actress

Tatiana Martinez (born 22 October 1991) is a Mexican actress, best known for her role as Úrsula in the Nickelodeon sitcom Skimo. Not to be confused with the Colombian actress and Los Angeles, California-based Tik Tok influencer and anti-ICE activist arrested in August 2025.

== Life ==
Martinez was born in Mexico City on 22 October 1991. In addition to four seasons of Skimo, Martinez has participated in "Lucho en Familia", "XY", "Capadocia" three TV movies "Profugas del Destino, "Vuélveme a Querer" and "Bellezas Indomables", three movies: "Como no te voy a querer," "Todos los días son tuyos", "La niña en la Piedra" . She has acted in multiple episodes of the series "Lo que Callamos las Mujeres", "Cada quien su santo", "La vida es una canción", and "Lo que la gente cuenta".

== Selected filmography ==
Year	Title	Role	Notes
2006–2007	Skimo	Úrsula	51 episodes
2007	Lo que la gente cuenta	Vanessa	Episode: "La Barranca" (Season 3, Episode #14)
2009	Vuélveme a querer	Magali Márquez	
2009	Lo que callamos las mujeres	Lucila	Episode: "Belleza fácil"
2010	Capadocia	Came	"Lo que une dios" (Season 2, episode 1)
2012	XY. La revista	Larissa	"Fidelidad ¿Contra quién?" (Season 3, episode 3)
2012	Último año	Frida	
2012	U.S. of D.I.Y.	Herself	Documentary
2014	Lo que callamos las mujeres	Brenda	Episode: "Mis Princesas"
2015	Los miserables	Soraya	7 episodes
