= Corazón Bipolar (song) =

Single by Paty Cantú

from the album Corazón Bipolar
- Released: September 10, 2012
- Recorded: 2012
- Genre: Pop
- Length: 3:17
- Label: EMI
- Songwriters: Paty Cantú, Angela Burguette, Ximena Muñoz

Paty Cantú singles chronology
"Se Desintegra El Amor" (2011)	"Corazón Bipolar" (2012)	"Suerte" (2013)

Music video
- "Corazón Bipolar" on YouTube

"Corazón Bipolar" (English: "Bipolar Heart") is the first single by Mexican singer Paty Cantú from her third studio album, Corazón Bipolar, released in 2012.

== Commercial performance ==
The song entered the top ten of the Billboard charts in Mexico, becoming a hit and helping promote the album which eventually certified gold there.

== Charts ==
Chart (2012)	Peak position
Mexican Espanol Airplay (Billboard)	3
Mexico Airplay (Billboard)	7
