= Skimo =

- Starring: Daniel Tovar; Miguel Santa Rita; Tatiana Martinez; Alejandra Vazquez; Avelina Vazquez; Paul Cortinas; Pedro Romo(1-2); Claudia Bollat; Oswaldo Ibarra; Karen Sandoval(3-4)
- Country of origin: Mexico
- No. of seasons: 4
- No. of episodes: 52

Production
- Executive producers: Charlie Singer; Tatiana Rodriguez

Original release
- Network: Nickelodeon Latin America
- Release: 15 May 2006 – 30 November 2007

Skimo is a Mexican sitcom. It is produced by Nickelodeon Latin America and Macias Group International. The opening song for the show, "Skimo es el lugar" ("Skimo Is the Place"), is performed by the pop rock band Motel.

== Overview of the show ==
Skimo is the story of two boys, Fito and Tavo, who made their dreams a reality by opening their own shop. Skimo is described as "the coolest place in the neighbourhood". As an eatery, Skimo sells many innovative flavoured foods, like strawberry milkshakes, mango on a stick with chamoy sauce, and vanilla ice cream-stuffed peppers.

== Running gags ==
There are several running gags in the show: 1) whenever Uuuu's name is called he jumps into the air out of his fishbowl; 2) Ursula bangs Nora and Nori's heads together whenever they bother her; and, 3) many of the characters refer to Don Filemon as "Don File"—which aggravates him.

== Cast ==
=== Main ===
- Fito Rey Pérez (Daniel Tovar): He is the typical "cool guy" co-protagonist in the series. He does not earn good grades in school, but he is athletic and portrays himself as "the coolest dude in the neighborhood" almost everywhere and always has odd ideas to improve Skimo (like selling one Skimo at twice its price, instead of selling 2X1). He likes rock, hip-hop, and beatbox music and he has an "internal beat" when he is speaking or doing something. He's a dreamer and a schemer, and he talks about his fantasies as if they were real. Fito is 16 years old. His most distinctive feature is his surfer-afro hair, and his skater-style clothes.
- Tavo Nachón (Miguel Santa Rita): He is Fito's best friend, although they call themselves business partners. He is the smart co-protagonist in the series, and his intelligence is fundamental to Skimo's success. He has a secret crush on Úrsula. He is very timid, and also considered a "geek" due to his obsession with order, control, and extreme cleanliness. He uses better or different words than Fito because he is smarter. In the first episode is revealed that Tavo's last name is "Nachón". Just like all of the friends, Tavo is the opposite of Fito, and maybe that's the reason that they are friends. He wears casual clothes and hates every kind of sickness. Tavo is 17 years old. By the end of season 2, his parents get divorced and he has to go live in another state and this ends season 2. In season 3 he spends a lot of time with his new girlfriend, Cris, who makes Ursula very jealous; however, it is hinted that maybe he is still in love with Ursula. Tavo's name was probably inspired by the Spanish word "bonachón", which translated to means "goody".
- Úrsula Pereyra (Tatiana Martinez): She is the "I-always-do-the-right-thing" girl, and she is a very good friend of Fito and Tavo, but she ignores the fact that Tavo has a crush on her. Ursula is very intelligent and can fix almost any gadget. She is totally cool and is sometimes considered to be gothic or punk. She always wants Fito and Tavo to use their brains to solve their problems. Ursula is courageous and fearless; she is the opposite of Nora and Nori. She will sometimes bang Nora and Nori's heads together. She adds red highlights to her hair in Season two. Ursula is 16 years old. In season two, Ursula falls in love with Fito, who seems to have fallen in love with her too (ignoring the fact that they are always arguing). Their crush fades almost instantly, and from season 3 onward, she starts developing a crush on Tavo and tries several times to steal him from Cris. In the last episode of the show, Ursula leaves high school and accepts Tavo's proposal to have a romantic relationship.
- Mucho Mucho (Oswaldo Ibarra): He is the classic jack-of-all-trades, and helps supply Skimo. He likes to say his name a lot and talks very quickly. He is also seen doing another jobs, like those of policeman, plumber, doctor, surgeon, etc. He always has every needed thing in his almost infinite Hammerspace bag. His name might translate as "A lot A lot" or "Very Very".
- Don Filemón (Pedro Romo): He was the owner of the pizzeria that once occupied the site that Skimo now occupies. Fito and Tavo decided to rent the whole place from him to make Skimo. Don Filemón is the classical lifelong storyteller, and always speaks about his world travels, or his travelling family; no one believes these stories.
- Fátima (Claudia Bollat): She is the portly, expert cook in Skimo. She makes all dishes and meals and helps with a lot of things. She is a very dreamy person who likes to know how much she is needed. She sometimes experiments by combining two different recipes, making the dishes that Skimo is noted for. When the order is done she shouts very loud "Sale un (order) para la mesa (number of the table)" which is Spanish for "Ready some... (order)... for the table number...(number of the table)" until the grade of a deafening. She also has an alter ego known as Super Fat, a renowned professional wrestler. The reason she became a wrestler was to get revenge against her ex-boyfriend Nitro because he refused to drink one of her strawberry milkshakes. However, it is later proved that Nitro is actually allergic to strawberries, so they solve their misunderstanding and go back together.
- Nora and Nori (Alejandra and Avelina Vazquez): Nora and Nori are 16 years old and are the typical antagonists in the show. They are very show-offy, irritating, selfish, and annoying. They always want to lead Skimo to bankruptcy, and also try to complicate everything in Fito and Tavo's life. They always refer to one another as twine, and they shout out "twin power" anytime they have an idea or plot. Also, anytime Nora and Nori hear something outrageous they shout "Oh Please". Everyone in the show mistakes one for the other.
- Shi (Paul Cortinas): He is a very good example of a video game addict. He was included in a very expensive arcade machine that Fito bought "because it has 3-D Graphics and it was very cheap". He is always playing at the arcade machine, and during the little times he leaves the machine, he plays handheld video games. He never allows anyone to touch the arcade when he is playing, except for Shila. In one episode, he receives a trophy for being the country's best gamer. Nobody really knows who this 12-year-old boy is. In the beginning, it was thought that Shi was speechless, but in the last episode is revealed that he speaks.
- Cris Long: She's like Tavo's girlfriend and crushes from season 3-. She collects Wrestling masks like Tavo. She is Nora and Nori's, cousin. She almost married Tavo at the Kermes Fair, but Nora and Nori arrested them just before Tavo was about to say yes. She is portrayed by Karen Sandoval
- Deyanira: She's Cris's "not too well looking" friend. She fell in love with Fito but Fito didn't fall in love with her. Indeed, she married Fito at the Kermes Fair. Fito can't free himself from the marriage unless he gets the "wedding ring" off of his finger, but it is stuck. When Fito finally breaks her heart she gets a makeover and enters the "Miss Skimo" contest by posing as an international super-model with who Fito instantly develops a crush.

=== Notable guest stars ===
- Motel
- Kudai
- RBD
- Kalimba Marichal
- Jesse & Joy
- María Antonieta de las Nieves as La Chilindrina
- Gerardo Reyero

== Episodes ==
Season	Episodes	Originally released	
Season	Episodes	First released	Last released
1	13	May 15, 2006	August 21, 2006
2	14	October 30, 2006	February 19, 2007
3	13	April 23, 2007	July 30, 2007
4	10	September 30, 2007	November 23, 2007

== Broadcast ==
The show first aired on 15 May 2006, and ran at 8:00 pm for the first two seasons. In the third season of the show, it was moved to 6:00 pm on Mondays. For the 2007 summer-fall transition, the show aired reruns on weekdays at 7:00 pm; also, during the 2006 summer-fall transition, the show aired reruns on Mondays at 6:00 pm; during the 2007 break between seasons 2 and 3, the show aired reruns of 3 episodes on Mondays at 6:00 pm as well. From 2010 to 2013, it aired reruns on Nick at Nite block on Nickelodeon Latin America.
