= Lu (duo) =

Mexican musical group (2002–07)

- Origin: Guadalajara, Mexico
- Genres: Latin pop
- Years active: 2002–2007
- Labels: Warner
- Past members: Mario Sandoval; Paty Cantú

Lu was a Mexican pop duo formed by Mario Sandoval and Paty Cantú, both from Guadalajara, Mexico. The sound of their music is similar to Aleks Syntek's, Sin Bandera, Mecano or Sentidos Opuestos. They have received moderate success in the Spanish-speaking world, with songs like "Por Besarte" and "Duele."

== Career ==
Paty was studying law, but she changed to music when they were signed to Warner Music Mexico. Mario started to write lyrics at the age of 6 when he wrote a song called "Teresa." Their debut album is self-titled and was produced by Áureo Baqueiro, producer of artists like Natalia Lafourcade, Sin Bandera, Kabah, and Mœnia.

Their videos had good reception between MTV, Telehit, and Ritmoson Latino, among others. Also they did a ReEdition of their album debut which has a cover of Alejandro Sanz's song "Viviendo Deprisa."

They also enjoyed success in Brazil because their song "Por Besarte" is played on Rebelde. Their album debut was released in May 2006. Actually, their album debut sold over 30,000 in that country and gained the status of Gold. The downloads of the ringtone "Por Besarte" peaked at #2.

=== Break-up ===
After several rumors, finally, on August 7, 2007 it was confirmed that the duet would say "goodbye" to the stages. Mario stated that the reason behind the separation were personal and professional differences between him and Paty. Paty then declared that the separation was "definitive".

Their last concert as a duo was that October, in Reynosa, México.

== Discography ==
=== Studio albums ===
| Title | Album details | Certifications |
|---|---|---|
| Lu | Released: March 3, 2004; Formats: CD; Label: Warner Music | AMPROFON: Platinum |
| Álbum | Released: September 26, 2006; Formats: CD; Label: Sony Music BMG | AMPROFON: Gold |

=== Singles ===
List of Spanish singles, with selected chart positions, showing year released and album name
| Title | Year | Peak chart positions | | | Album |
| Title | Year | MEX | US Latin Pop | US Hot Latin | Album |
|---|---|---|---|---|---|
| "Duele" | 2004 | — | — | — | Lu |
| "Una Confusión" | 2004 | — | 18 | 40 | Lu |
| "Por Besarte" | 2005 | 1 | 10 | 20 | Lu |
| "Será" | 2005 | — | — | — | Lu |
| "La Vida Después De Ti" | 2006 | 4 | 11 | 22 | Álbum |
| "Si Tú Me Quisieras" | 2007 | 26 | — | — | Álbum |
"—" denotes items that did not chart or were not released.

== Award nominations ==
| Year | Nominee / work | Award | Result |
|---|---|---|---|
| 2004 | Best New Artist Mexico | MTV Video Music Awards Latin America 2004 | Nominated |
| 2006 | Best New Soloist or Group of the Year | Premios Lo Nuestro 2006 | Nominated |
