= Adrianna Foster =

Mexican singer

Adrianna Foster Adriana Gabriela Erosa Rodríguez
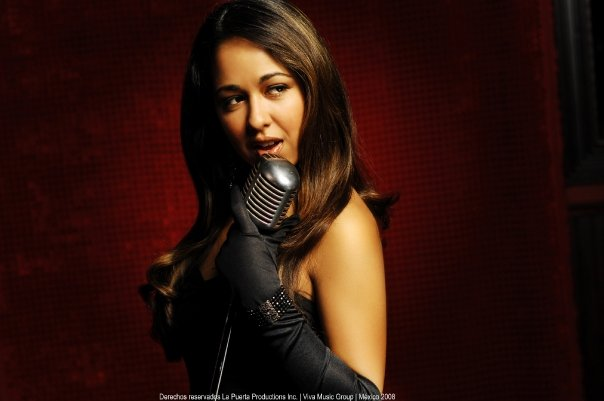

Background information
- Born: 8 July 1986 (age 39); Guadalajara
- Origin: Guadalajara, Mexico
- Genres: Soul, indie pop, Jazz, pop
- Occupation: Singer
- Instruments: Voice (Contralto), guitar, piano
- Years active: 1997–present
- Label: Viva Music Group
- Website: adriannafoster.com
- Facebook: AdriannaFosterOfficial
- Twitter: AdriannaFoster

Adriana Gabriela Erosa Rodríguez, better known as Adrianna Foster (b. 8 July 1986, Guadalajara), is a prominent Mexican singer of soul, jazz, and pop. She gained fame in 2008 with her single Pienso en ti and has been referenced as being "the Mexican Mariah Carey." Singer-songwriters Francisco Céspedes and José José have called her "the Voice of Mexico" (Spanish: La voz de México).

== Biography ==
=== Beginnings ===
Foster was born in Guadalajara. She began to show a talent for music singing at the age of three. She won her first singing competition at the age of eight and would then on be invited regularly to sing at local festivals.

In 1998, a 12-year-old Foster met and impressed Barry Ivan White of The Platters at a singing competition in Cancún, Quintana Roo with her singing aptitude and on-stage charisma. White invited her to sing at a famous hotel in the city and there she sang Celine Dion's signature song, My Heart Will Go On. White would again invite Foster to sing, but this time at a Platters concert in Rhode Island, near Boston, Massachusetts where she sang four songs.

=== 2000–2007: Career begins ===
In 2000, Foster traveled to Miami, Florida to receive musical tutoring from Gina Maretta and in that same year performed as the main artist of the "Victory for Youth" festival. In 2004, she returned to her native Guadalajara to study audio at the 8 Bit school and would remain there as an audio assistant for 10 months, combining that with her guitar and piano lessons. Also in 2004 was the Orlando "Fashion Rock" festival in which she among 2000 other competitors placed very high, obtaining the event's prize for Best Youth Singer.

In 2005, Foster joined the Guadalajara band Stinky Cows, performed at the Hard Rock Live event held in the city that year, and would graduate from the SAE Institute in Miami in audio design and music production. The next year, she would sing in the chorus of the Mariah Carey song Say Somethin'.

In 2008, Foster released her first album, Esperandote, and found herself at the top of popularity charts for three months.
