= Vicente Fernández discography =

Recording collections by Mexican singer

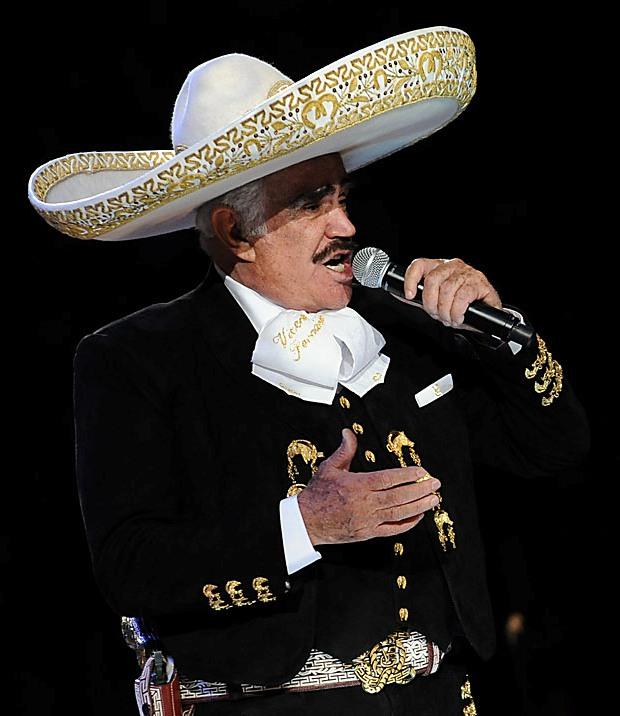
- Fernández performing in 2013
- Studio albums: 112
- Compilation albums: 135
- Singles: 161

The discography of Mexican singer Vicente Fernández (1940–2021) consists of more than 100 published recordings through albums and singles since the start of Fernández's career as a singer.

== Albums ==
=== Studio albums ===
List of studio albums, with selected details, chart positions, and certifications
Title	Details	Peak chart positions					Certifications
Title	Details	MEX	SPA	US	US Latin	US Reg. Mex	Certifications
La Voz Que Usted Esperaba	Released: 1968; Label: Caytronics	—	—	—	—	—	
Vicente Fernández	Released: 1969; Label: CBS	—	—	—	—	—	
Palabra del Rey	Released: 1969; Label: CBS	—	—	—	—	—	
Ni En Defensia Propia	Released: 1970; Label: CBS	—	—	—	—	—	
Me Está Esperando María	Released: 1971; Label: Caytronics	—	—	—	—	—	
¡Arriba Huentitàn!	Released: 1972; Label: CBS	—	—	—	—	—	
Volver Volver	Released: 1973; Label: CBS	—	—	—	—	—	
El Ídolo de Mexico	Released: 1974; Label: CBS	—	—	—	—	—	
El Hijo del Pueblo	Released: 1975; Label: Caytronics	—	—	—	—	—	RIAA: 2× Platinum (Latin)
Canta Para Recordar	Released: 1975; Label: Caytronics	—	—	—	—	—	
Joyas Rancheras al Estilo de Vicente Fernández	Released: 1976; Label: Caytronics	—	—	—	—	—	RIAA: Platinum (Latin)
A Tu Salud	Released: 1976; Label: CBS	—	—	—	—	—	
La Muerte de un Gallero	Released: 1977; Label: Caytronics	—	—	—	—	—	
El Rancherisimo	Released: 1977; Label: CBS	—	—	—	—	—	
A Pesar de Todo	Released: 1978; Label: CBS	—	—	—	—	—	
Mi Amigo El Tordillo	Released: 1979; Label: CBS	—	—	—	—	—	RIAA: Platinum (Latin)
El Tahúr	Released: 1979; Label: CBS	—	—	—	—	—	RIAA: 2× Platinum (Latin)
El Tapatío	Released: 1980; Label: CBS	—	—	—	—	—	
El Número Uno	Released: 1981; Label: CBS	—	—	—	—	—	RIAA: Platinum (Latin)
Valses del Recuerdo	Released: 1981; Label: CBS	—	—	—	—	—	
...Es La Diferencia	Released: 1982; Label: CBS	—	—	—	—	—	
Un Mexicano En La México	Released: 1984; Label: CBS	—	—	—	—	—	
De un Rancho a Otro	Released: 1985; Label: CBS	—	—	—	—	6	
La Leyenda	Released: 1985; Label: CBS	—	—	—	—	—	
Vicente le Canta a América Latina	Released: 1986; Label: CBS	—	—	—	—	—	
Hoy Platiqué con Mi Gallo	Released: 1986; Label: CBS	—	—	—	—	2	
Dos Corazones (with Vikki Carr)	Released: 1987; Label: CBS Discos	—	—	—	—	2	
El Cuatrero	Released: 1988; Label: CBS Discos	—	—	—	—	2	RIAA: Platinum (Latin)
Por Tu Maldito Amor	Released: 1989; Label: CBS Discos	—	—	—	—	1	RIAA: 2× Platinum (Latin)
Las Clasicas de José Alfredo Jiménez	Released: 1990; Label: CBS Discos	—	—	—	—	3	
Mientras Ustedes No Dejen de Aplaudir...	Released: 1990; Label: CBS Discos	—	—	—	—	3	
El Charro Mexicano	Released: 1991; Label: CBS Discos	—	—	—	—	—	
Que de Raro Tiene	Released: 1992; Label: Columbia	—	—	—	44	2	RIAA: 2× Platinum (Latin)
Lastima Que Seas Ajena	Released: 1993; Label: Sony Discos	—	—	—	—	5	RIAA: 4× Platinum (Latin)
Recordando a Los Panchos	Released: 1994; Label: Sony Discos	—	—	—	6	2	RIAA: 2× Platinum (Latin)
Aunque Me Duela el Alma	Released: 1995; Label: Sony Discos	—	—	—	14	8	RIAA: 2× Platinum (Latin)
Estatua de Marfil	Released: 1997; Label: Columbia	—	—	—	12	5	
Entre el Amor y Yo	Released: 1998; Label: Sony	—	—	—	6	1	AMPROFON: 3× Gold; RIAA: 4× Platinum (Latin)
Lobo Herido	Released: 2000	—	—	—	15	4	AMPROFON: Gold; RIAA: Platinum (Latin)
Más con El Número Uno	Released: 2001	—	—	— (Note: Más Con El Número Uno did not enter the Billboard 200, but peaked at number 29 on the Heatseekers Albums chart.)	3	2	AMPROFON: Gold; RIAA: 2× Platinum (Latin)
Se Me Hizo Tarde la Vida	Released: 2003	—	—	— (Note: Se Me Hizo Tarde La Vida did not enter the Billboard 200, but peaked at number 18 on the Heatseekers Albums chart.)	5	3	AMPROFON: Gold
Mis Corridos Consentidos	Released: 2005	—	—	131	5	2	
La Tragedia del Vaquero	Released: 2006	—	—	182	7	1	
Para Siempre	Released: September 18, 2007; Label: Sony BMG Norte; Formats: Digital download, CD, DVD	1	95	38	1	1	AMPROFON: Diamond+Gold; RIAA: Gold
Necesito de Ti	Released: July 7, 2009; Label: Sony; Formats: Digital download, CD, DVD	7	—	58	2	1	AMPROFON: Platinum
El Hombre Que Mas Te Amó	Released: 2009	3	—	102	1	1	AMPROFON: Platinum
Otra Vez	Released: 2011	12	—	—	3	2	AMPROFON: Platinum
Los 2 Vicentes	Released: 2012	—	—	—	9	3	AMPROFON: Gold
Hoy	Released: 2013	—	—	151	2	1	
Mano a Mano: Tangos a la Manera de Vicente Fernández	Released: 2014	—	—	—	11	3	
Muriendo de Amor	Released: 2015	—	—	—	1	1	
Más Romántico Que Nunca	Released: 2018	—	—	—	31	8	
A Mis 80's	Released: 2020; Label: Sony; Won a Grammy award under the Best Regional Mexican Music Album category in 2022.	—	—	—	—	—	
Vicente Fernández Con Banda	Released: 2022; Label: Sony; Formats: Digital download, CD	—	—	—	—	—	
Tributo Al Rey Con Banda: Grandes Éxitos, Vol. 1	Released: 2026; Label: Sony; Formats: Digital download, CD	—	—	—	—	—	
Tributo Al Rey Con Banda: Grandes Éxitos, Vol. 2	Released: 2026; Label: Sony; Formats: Digital download, Vinyl	—	—	—	—	—	

=== Live albums ===
List of live albums, with selected details, chart positions, and certifications
Title	Details	Peak chart positions				Certifications	
Title	Details	US	US Latin	MEX Reg.	MEX	Certifications	
En Vivo: Juntos Por Ultima Vez (with Alejandro Fernández)	Released: October 14, 2003; Label: Sony Latin; Formats: CD, DVD	196	4	1	—	AMPROFON: 2× Platinum+Gold	
Primera Fila	Released: November 18, 2008; Label: Sony Latin; Formats: Digital download, CD, DVD	92	1	1	1	AMPROFON: Diamond; RIAA: Platinum (Latin); RIAA: Platinum (DVD)	
Un Mexicano en la México	Released: July 20, 2010; Label: Sony Latin; Formats: Digital download, CD, DVD	—	10	4	4	AMPROFON: Platinum	
Un Azteca en El Azteca	Released: 2016	—	—	—	9	1	AMPROFON: 2× Platinum

=== Compilation albums ===
List of compilation albums, with selected details, chart positions, and certifications
Title	Details	Peak chart positions			Certifications
Title	Details	US	US Latin	MEX Reg.	Certifications
Historia de un Ídolo, Vol. 1	Released: November 21, 2000; Label: Sony Latin	81	1	1	AMPROFON: 2× Platinum; RIAA: Gold
Historia de un Ídolo, Vol. 2	Released: 2002; Label: Sony Latin	— (Note: Historia de un Ídolo, Vol. 2 did not enter the Billboard 200, but peaked at number 18 on the Heatseekers Albums chart.)	2	1	AMPROFON: Gold; RIAA: Platinum (Latin)

== Singles ==
https://www.billboard.com/artist/vicente-fernandez/chart-history/htl/

- El Último Beso (#1)
- Aunque Me Duela el Alma (#2)
- Para Siempre (#2)
- Lástima Que Seas Ajena (#3)
- Estos Celos (#3)
- Aunque Mal Paguen Ellas (#4)
- Nos Estorbó la Ropa (#4)
- Me Voy a Quitar de en Medio (#4)
- No Te Vayas (#5)
- Que Sepan Todos (#6)
- Miseria (#6)
- La Derrota (#7)
- Aca Entre Nos (#8)
- La Fiesta (#8)
- No, No y No (#8)
- Borracho Te Recuerdo (#8)
- El Ayudante (#9)
- Dos Corazones (#10)
- Por Tu Maldito Amor (#10)
- Hoy Platiqué con Mi Gallo (#11)
- Aquí, el Que Manda Soy Yo (#11)
- El Descinfle (#12)
- Que de Raro Tiene (#12)
- Te Me Vas al Diablo (#12)
- Volver, Volver (#13)
- Ni con la Vida Te Pago (#13)
- Lobo Herido (#13)
- Sublime Mujer (#15)
- Eternamente (#15)
- Conocí a Tu Esposo (#16)
- El Rey (#17)
- Estatua de Marfil (#17)
- Bohemio de Aficion (#17)
- Mujeres Divinas (#18)
- Háganse a Un Lado (#19)
- La Primera con Agua (#19)
- Lo Quiero Todo (#20)
- El Vestido Blanco (#20)
- Que No Te Extrañe (#23)
- Porqué (#24)
- Como Dice el Refrán (#24)
- No Creo Que Tu (#24)
- Sufriendo y Penando (#25)
- Tan Fácil Que Hubiera Sido (#25)
- El Charro Mexicano (#26)
- Tres Regalos (#26)
- Necesito de Ti (#27)
- Miedo (#27)
- No Puedo Acostumbrarme a Estar Sin Ti (#28)
- Se Me Hizo Tarde la Vida (#32)
- No Te Voy a Perdonar (#36)
- Que Bonito Amor (#36)
- El Cuatrero (#38)
- El Hombre Que Más Te Amo (#41)
- La Tragedia del Vaquero (#43)
- Tengo Una Amante (#48)
- Estado Civil (#49)
- Nacho Bernal (#50)
