= Corazón Bipolar =

Studio album by Paty Cantú
- Released: November 6, 2012
- Recorded: 2011–2012
- Genre: Latin pop
- Label: EMI Music

Paty Cantú chronology
Afortunadamente No Eres Tú (2010)	Corazón Bipolar (2012)	#333 (2018)

Singles from Corazón Bipolar
- 1. "Corazón Bipolar" Released: September 10, 2012; 2. "Suerte" Released: February 25, 2013; 3. "Manual" Released: July 2013

Corazón Bipolar is the third album by the Mexican singer Paty Cantú, released in 2012.

== Track listing ==
1. Corazón Bipolar
2. Quiero X 2
3. Aparador (feat. María Barracuda y Niña Dioz)
4. Manual
5. Hechos No Palabras!
6. Mío – Samples Paulina Rubio's hit single Mío (1992)
7. Silencios Que Salvan
8. Suerte
9. Ojalá
10. El Sexo y el Amor
11. Beat Goes On (feat. Boy Blue)
12. Quiero Tenerte (feat. Erik Rubín)
13. Si Pudiera

== Certifications ==
Region	Certification	Certified units/sales
Mexico (AMPROFON)	Gold	30,000^{^}
^{^} Shipments figures based on certification alone.
