= Me Quedo Sola =

Studio album by Paty Cantú
- Released: January 27, 2009
- Recorded: 2008
- Genre: Latin pop
- Label: EMI Music

Paty Cantú chronology
Me Quedo Sola (2009)	Afortunadamente No Eres Tú (2010)

Singles from Me Quedo Sola
- 1. "Déjame Ir" Released: September 16, 2008; 2. "No Fue Suficiente" Released: March 23, 2009; 3. "Me Quedo Sola" Released: August 10, 2009

Me Quedo Sola is the first album by the Mexican singer Paty Cantú, launched in 2009. That same year a special edition of the album was released.

== Track listing ==
1. Un Amor Diferente
2. No Fue Suficiente
3. Déjame Ir
4. Pensarás En Mí
5. Sólo Por Estar
6. Me Quedo Sola
7. Ayúdame A No Llorar
8. Fui Una Más
9. Eclipse
10. Quiero Todo, Quiero Nada

== Charts ==
=== Weekly charts ===
Chart (2009)	Peak position
Mexican Albums (Top 100 Mexico)	3

=== Year-end charts ===
Chart (2009)	Position
Mexico (Mexican Albums Chart)	67
