= Resistiré (Dúo Dinámico song) =

Single by Dúo Dinámico

from the album En Forma
- Released: 1988
- Genre: Pop
- Length: 4:02
- Label: Sony
- Songwriters: Carlos Toro Montoro, Manuel de la Calva

"Resistiré" (English: "I Will Resist") is a song by the Spanish group Dúo Dinámico (Dynamic Duo in English), which appeared on their 1988 album En forma, the second one released by the duo after their reappearance two years before with the album Dúo Dinámico, the first one they recorded for Sony.

It has become one of the most well-known songs of the group, especially after being included in the soundtrack of Pedro Almodóvar's film ¡Átame! (1990) and being chosen as an anthem during the COVID-19 pandemic in Spain, being played in many cities and neighborhoods of the country every day at 8 pm along with the applause that Spanish citizens dedicate every day to their health services.

Resistiré was composed by Manuel de la Calva, one of the members of the Duo Dinámico, who was inspired by Camilo José Cela's phrase “el que resiste gana” and the lyrics were written by Carlos Toro Montoro, sports journalist and Spanish composer, creator of more than 1,800 songs with many of them becoming important hits.

== Versions ==
Argentine singer Estela Raval covered the song on her album Adelante! (2003). She was inspired to record on the song due to her battle with cancer. On January 13, 2003, the Argentine television station Telefe premiered the tele-novel Resistiré. A version of the eponymous song was selected, performed by the singer and composer David Bolzoni -ex AQM- who participated in a casting with other versions of great Argentine artists of the stature of Antonio Birabent, La portuaria, JAF. The winner to everyone's surprise was that of the AQM duo (it was a peculiarity since the original performers were also a duo). With an eloquent and very seasoned interpretation of the singer and with a punk-rock base, this version became a success overwhelming in Argentina at a time of a deep economic crisis, reaching the hearts of millions of Argentines, and reaching the number one position in radio rankings. The version of AQM also had repercussions in other countries, where the soap opera "Resistiré" was also broadcast.

Dominican singer Toño Rosario recorded a merengue rendition of the song on his 2004 album of the same name. His version peaked at number 44 on the Billboard Hot Latin Songs and number 4 on the Tropical Songs charts respectively in 2005. At the 2006 Latin Billboard Music Awards, it was nominated Tropical Airplay Song of the Year by a Male Artist.

=== Anthem of the 2020 coronavirus pandemic in Spain ===
During the quarantine due to the COVID-19 pandemic, the song became popular again among the citizens, that went out to the balconies to sing it along and to encourage the workers of the Spanish Health System. It has been identified as an anthem of resistance and overcoming of the health crisis.

With this purpose, a new version was recorded featuring many well-known Spanish singers: Álex Ubago, Álvaro Soler, Andrés Ceballos (Dvicio), Andrés Suárez, Blas Cantó, Carlos Baute, Conchita, David Bisbal, David Otero, David Summers, Dani Marco (Despistaos), Diana Navarro, Ele, Georgina, India Martínez, Iván Torres (Efecto Pasillo), José Mercé, Josemi Carmona, Manuel Carrasco, Melendi, Mikel Erentxun, Nil Moliner, Pastora Soler, Pedro Guerra, Pitingo, Rosana, Rozalén, Rulo, Sofía Ellar, Susana Alva (Efecto Mariposa) and Vanesa Martín.

Its authors also transferred the rights of the song to the Community of Madrid, for its use in institutional campaigns while the state of alarm due to coronavirus lasts. The social repercussion caused has increased views on Spotify by more than 435% since March 15, 2020, after publications began to circulate on people's social networks singing it on their balconies, according to the EFE Agency.

== See also ==
- Resistiré México
