= Afortunadamente No Eres Tú =

Studio album by Paty Cantú
- Released: August 17, 2010
- Recorded: 2009–2010
- Genre: Latin pop
- Label: EMI Music

Paty Cantú chronology
| Me Quedo Sola (2009) | Afortunadamente No Eres Tú (2010) | Corazón Bipolar (2012) |

Singles from Afortunadamente No Eres Tú
- 1. "Afortunadamente No Eres Tú" Released: May 17, 2010; 2. "Clavo Que Saca Otro Clavo" Released: October 4, 2010; 3. "Goma De Mascar" Released: March 22, 2011; 4. "Se Desintegra El Amor" Released: July 21, 2011

Afortunadamente No Eres Tú is the second album by the Mexican singer Paty Cantú, released in 2010.

== Track listing ==
1. Afortunadamente No Eres Tú
2. Goma De Mascar
3. Clavo Que Saca Otro Clavo
4. Se Desintegra El Amor
5. Vuelve A Amarme
6. No-Oh Se Apaga
7. Fe
8. La Que Está En Vez De Mí
9. Fue Sólo Sexo
10. No Tengo Miedo
11. De Nuevo
12. Se Desintegra El Amor (Versión Acústica) (Only in iTunes)

== Charts ==
=== Weekly charts ===
| Chart (2010) | Peak position |
|---|---|
| Mexican Albums (Top 100 Mexico) | 10 |

=== Year-end charts ===
| Chart (2010) | Position |
|---|---|
| Mexico (Mexican Albums Chart) | 83 |
