= No Fue Suficiente =

Single by Paty Cantú

from the album Me Quedo Sola
- Released: March 23, 2009
- Recorded: 2009
- Genre: Pop
- Length: 3:22
- Label: EMI
- Songwriter: Paty Cantú

Paty Cantú singles chronology
"Déjame Ir" (2008)	"No Fue Suficiente" (2009)	"Me Quedo Sola" (2009)

Music video
- "No Fue Suficiente" on YouTube

"No Fue Suficiente" (English: "It Wasn't Enough") is the second single by Mexican singer Paty Cantú from her debut studio album, Me Quedo Sola, released in 2009.

== Charts ==
Chart (2009)	Peak position
Mexican Espanol Airplay (Billboard)	5
Mexico Airplay (Billboard)	8
US Latin Pop Airplay (Billboard)	34
