= Resistiré México =

Single by Artists for Mexico
- Language: Spanish
- English title: I Will Resist
- Released: 16 April 2020
- Length: 4:12
- Label: OCESA Seitrack; Universal Music Mexico; Sony Music Mexico; Warner Music Mexico
- Songwriters: Carlos Toro Montoro; Manuel de la Calva Diego
- Producer: Armando Ávila

Music video
- "Resistiré México" on YouTube

"Resistiré México" is a song and charity single recorded by the supergroup Artists for Mexico in 2020. It is a remake of the 1988 hit song "Resistiré", which was written and performed by Dúo Dinámico. In May 2020, it was confirmed that all revenue from "Resistiré México" would go to COVID-19 pandemic in Mexico.

== Background ==
During the quarantine due to the COVID-19 pandemic, a new version was recorded featuring many well-known Mexican singers. The project is led by Warner Music Mexico with the assistance of other record companies like OCESA Seitrack, Sony Music Mexico and Universal Music Mexico. The song was launched commercially on April 16, 2020. "Resistiré México" was written by Carlos Toro Montoro and Manuel de la Calva and produced by Armando Ávila.

In May 2020, it was confirmed that all revenue from "Resistiré México" would go towards the Temporary Unit COVID-19, installed in the Citibanamex Center.

== Music video ==
The music video was released on April 16, 2020 on the Warner Music Mexico's YouTube and the other video channels.

== Artists for Mexico musicians ==
- Aida Cuevas
- Arath Herce
- Axel Muñiz
- Benny Ibarra
- Belinda
- Camila
- Caztro
- Chucho Rivas
- Cristian Castro
- DLD
- Edith Márquez
- Gloria Trevi
- Ha*Ash
- Horacio Palencia
- Kaia Lana
- Kinky
- Leonel Garcia
- Lila Downs
- Lupe Esparza
- María José
- María León
- MC Davo
- Mijares
- Mœnia
- Paty Cantú
- Río Roma
- Rodrigo Davila
- Sandra Echeverria
- Ximena Sariñana
- Yahir

== Charts ==
Chart (2020)	Peak position
Mexican Espanol Airplay (Billboard)	4
Mexican Airplay (Billboard)	15
Spain Digital Song Sales (Billboard)	1

== Release history ==
Region	Date	Format	Label	Ref.
Various	April 16, 2020	Digital download; streaming	Warner Music México	

== See also ==
- Resistiré (Dúo Dinámico song)
