= Motel (Mexican band) =

Mexican rock band

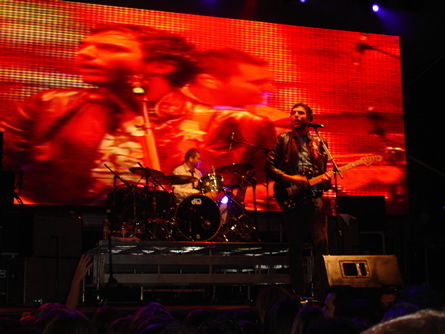

Background information
- Origin: Mexico City, Mexico
- Genres: Rock, power pop
- Years active: 2000–present
- Labels: Warner Music; Capitol Latin
- Members: Rodrigo Dávila Chapoy; Guillermo Méndez
- Past members: Rubén Puente; Michel DeQuevedo; José Damián
- Website: motelmx.com

Motel is a Mexican rock band created in 2002, consisting of Guillermo "Billy" Méndez and Rodrigo Dávila Chapoy.

== History ==
Motel was formed when its original members — Rodrigo and Billy — reunited to perform music casually, without long-term career intentions. Both recorded songs in music studios and rehearsals independently for several months before coming together as a group. They then played as a duo in bars in Mexico City, eventually inviting Michel DeQuevedo (drums) and Rubén Puente (bass) to form part of the band. Michel DeQuevedo was later replaced by José Damián (drums)

In March 2006, they released their debut album, Motel, and single, "Dime Ven", both produced by Aureo Baqueiro and co-produced by Jay de la Cueva under the Warner Music label. "Dime Ven" peaked at second place in the Mexican Hot 100 in July 2006, coming just short of Julieta Venegas's "Me Voy". Motel followed with a second single, "Olvídame". The same year, Motel wrote Skimo es el Lugar for the television sitcom Skimo, broadcast by Nickelodeon Latinamerica.

By March 2007, Motel announced through their website the upcoming release of their second album, 17, which was released on 20 November 2007. 17' first single, "Y Te Vas", was released in anticipation in October and listed as a weekly free download on iTunes. "17" was released on 29 January in the United States, after the band had promoted in the U.S. Later, the band released three more singles: "Uno, Dos, Tres", "Dos Palabras" featuring Lu's lead singer, Paty Cantú, and "Ahí vienes". The band also promised to hold a concert soon for those under 18, since their last two concerts were exclusively for adults.

== Discography ==
=== Albums ===
- 2006: Motel
- 2007: 17
- 2010: Multicolor
- 2013: Prisma

Live albums

- 2008: Live Sessions (iTunes Exclusive)

=== Singles ===
List of Spanish singles, with selected chart positions and certifications, showing year released and album name
Title	Year	Peak chart positions					Album
Title	Year	MEX	CAL	SPA	ARG	US Latin	Album
"Dime Ven"	2006	2	11	22	21	—	Motel
"Olvidame"	2007	6	—	—	54	—	Motel
"Lejos Estamos Mejor"	2007	3	59	—	65	—	Motel
"Y Te Vas"	2007	5	22	9	87	—	17
"Uno, Dos, Tres"	2008	10	—	—	87	—	17
"Dos Palabras" (featuring Paty Cantú)	2008	3	73	—	—	41	17
"Ahí Vienes"	2008	38	—	—	—	—	17
"Aurora"	2009	—	—	—	—	—	Oveja Negra (OST)
"Somos Aire"	2010	6	60	—	—	—	Multicolor
"Donde Te Perdi"	2010	—	—	—	—	—	Multicolor
"Entre Caminos" (featuring Bimba Bosé)	2011	—	—	—	—	—	Multicolor
"Esferas"	2013	—	—	—	—	—	Prisma
"Sueño de Ti" (featuring Belinda & Milkman)	2014	—	—	—	—	—	Prisma
"Siempre Tú"	2014	—	—	—	—	—	Prisma
"Todo Para Ti"	2015	—	—	—	—	—	A La Mala (OST)
"Sólo el Amor Lastima Así" (featuring Maria José)	2015	—	—	—	—	—	A La Mala (OST)
"—" denotes a recording that did not chart or was not released in that territory.

==== As featured artist ====
List of Spanish singles, with selected chart positions and certifications, showing year released and album name
Title	Year	Peak chart positions		Album
Title	Year	Airplay	Español Airplay	Album
"Resistiré México" (among Artists for Mexico)	2020	15	4	Non-album single
