= Déjame Ir =

"Dejame Ir"

Single by Paty Cantú

from the album Me Quedo Sola
- Released: September 16, 2008
- Recorded: 2008
- Genre: Pop
- Length: 3:53
- Label: EMI
- Songwriters: Paty Cantú, Luis Fernando Ochoa

Paty Cantú singles chronology
"Dejame Ir" (2008)	"No Fue Suficiente" (2009)

Music video
- "Déjame Ir" on YouTube

"Déjame Ir" (English: "Let Me Go") is the first single by Mexican singer Paty Cantú from her debut studio album, Me Quedo Sola, released in 2008.

== Commercial performance ==
The song topped the airplay chart in Mexico, becoming Cantu's first number one hit and establishing her career as a pop star.

== Charts ==
Chart (2008)	Peak position
Mexican Espanol Airplay (Billboard)	2
Mexico Airplay (Billboard)	1
US Latin Pop Airplay (Billboard)	29
