= Motel (Motel album) =

Studio album by Motel
- Released: March 21, 2006 (Original Release); July 3, 2006 (Re-Release)
- Recorded: 2005–06
- Genre: Latin, soul, rock
- Label: Warner Music
- Producer: Motel; Jay de la Cueva; Aureo Baquiero

Motel chronology
Motel (2006)	17 (2007)

Motel is the debut album by the Mexican soul-rock band Motel. The album was released on March 21, 2006, in Mexico. Four months later, the album was released in countries like Guatemala, Venezuela, Chile, and the United States. Their first single is called Dime ven (English: Tell Me to Come. The song was very popular in Latin American and Mexican charts. They also released their last singles Olvídame and Lejos estamos mejor.

== Track listing ==
1. Olvídame (Forget Me) – 3:40
2. Dime ven (Tell Me to Come) – 3:41
3. A ti (To You) – 3:53
4. Magia tabú (Taboo Magic) – 4:34
5. Así me quedo (I'm Staying Like This) – 3:30
6. Lejos estamos mejor (We're Better Far Away) – 4:08
7. Por segunda vez (For the Second Time) – 3:47
8. Satélite (Satellite) – 3:53
9. Presente y sutil (Present and Subtle) – 4:13
10. Abriendo paso (Breaking Through) – 3:20
11. Perdón (Sorry) – 4:13

== Edición Especial ==
Songs from the original version plus acoustic version, bonus track Viento and the videos of Dime ven, Olvídame, and Lejos estamos mejor.

New Tracks (12–16)

1. Olvídame (Acústico)
2. Dime ven (Acústico)
3. Así me quedo (Acústico)
4. Lejos estamos mejor (Acústico)
5. Viento (English: Wind)
