= Paty Cantú =

Mexican singer

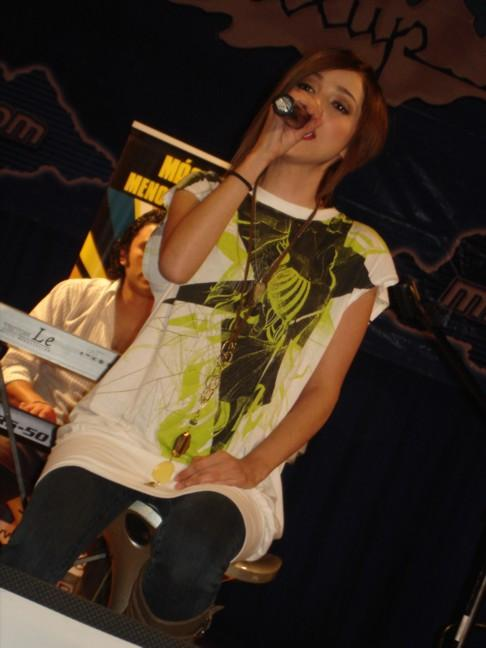

Background information
- Born: Patricia Giovanna Cantú Velasco; 25 November 1983 (age 42); Houston, Texas, U.S.
- Origin: Guadalajara, Jalisco, Mexico
- Genres: Pop; rock
- Occupations: Singer; songwriter
- Years active: 2000–2007 (group) 2008–present (solo)
- Labels: Warner Latina; EMI Mexico; Universal Mexico
- Website: patycantu.com

Patricia Giovanna Cantú Velasco (born 25 November 1983), known professionally as Paty Cantú, is a Mexican singer who rose to fame as one of the founding members of the pop duo Lu.

== Early life ==
Cantú was born in Houston, Texas on November 25, 1983, to Armando Cantú and Mercedes Velasco. A few months later, her family moved to Sonora and in 1987 they established in Guadalajara, Jalisco. At the age of 16, Cantú was drawn to entertaining people; she started taking bass and guitar lessons, eventually leaving law school to pursue her musical career.

== Music career ==
=== Lu ===
Paty Cantú became a member of the Mexican pop duo Lu alongside Mario Sandoval. The pair rose to fame with hits like Por Besarte, Una Confusión and La Vida Después de Ti and being certified gold and platinum for both records in Mexico and USA. Their self-titled debut album was released in 2004, which was produced by Aureo Baqueiro, producer of artists like Natalia Lafourcade, Sin Bandera, Kabah, and Moenia, had success in Mexico and Brazil in which enjoyed success because they and their song "Por Besarte" were featured on Rebelde. Her songwriting skills were shown in the track "Sé" and in writing songs for Eiza González and Alejandra Guzmán. After various reeditions from their first album, and a sophomore one called "Álbum", it was announced on August 27, 2007 that Mario and Paty parted ways due to artistic ideas, giving their last concert in October in Reynosa, Tamaulipas.

=== Solo ===
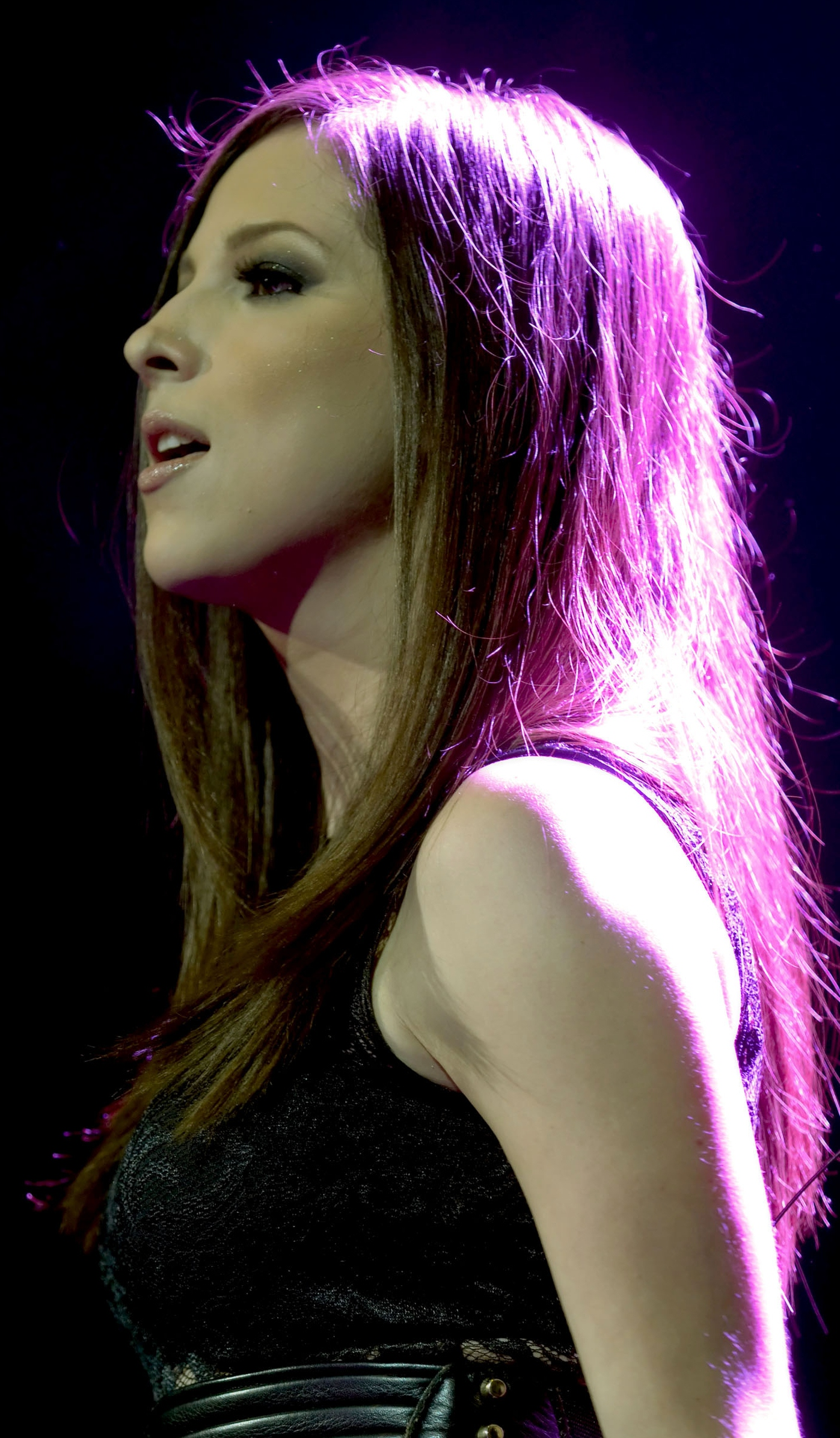
Cantú on stage

After the split, Cantú started to write songs for her debut album, having 54 songs before selecting the final 10. In 2008, she was featured in Motel's "Dos Palabras" which was released on August 12 and appeared in the reedition of their second album 17 Bis. After that, Paty Cantú debuted as a solo artist on October 17 as an opening act for Mexican singer Aleks Syntek, making this her start as a successful solo singer. In November 2008, Paty Cantú released her first single "Déjame Ir", which reached Top 10 in the Mexican Radio Airplay proving an instant hit and the video was premiered in MTV on November 18. Her album Me Quedo Sola was released on January 27, 2009 under EMI composed of 10 songs, 9 written by her and 1 written by Billy Mendez from Motel. In only three days of sales, Me Quedo Sola debuted at #8 in "Lo Mas Vendido" in Mixup and after a week, the album reached #1. However, in the Mexico Main Top 100 Albums Chart reached #2, just under Vicente Fernández.

"No Fue Suficiente", her second single was released on February 21 and its video was inspired by Tim Burton was produced by Esteban Madrazo and debuted in "Los 10+ Pedidos" of MTV. She started to write songs for Alejandro Fernández, Dulce María's debut album as well as upcoming greatest hits from Alejandra Guzmán.

In August 2009 it was announced that Paty Cantú would participate in the movie Tinker Bell and the Lost Treasure as part of the soundtrack with the song Historia Ancestral, which was to be released on September 4, 2009. She also announced in her MySpace that her debut album would have a reedition which include new tracks like Muñeca de Papel written by Billy from Motel, Casi Divas featuring Alfonso Pichardo, lead singer from Moenia and Mi Amor Destruye featuring Ballesteros.

Paty Cantú was nominated for Los Premios MTV Latinoamérica 2009 in two categories, one alongside her former mate Mario Sandoval and his group Sandoval. On September 29, Paty Cantú received two nominations for Premios Oye!, the Mexican Grammy Awards for Breakthrough of the Year alongside Alexander Acha, Beto Cuevas, Tush and Victor & Leo and Best Female Solo competing against Colombian Fanny Lú, Italian singer Laura Pausini and connationals María José and Natalia Lafourcade.

Paty Cantu's song "Afortunadamente no eres tu" was used in a MasterCard commercial as well as Niñas Mal's soundtrack.

She is featured in the single "The World is Ours" used by Coca-Cola to promote the 2014 FIFA World Cup. The single is featured in the album One Love, One Rhythm.

In 2018, she released her fourth album, #333.

On April 16, 2020, she participated in a charity single for the people of Mexico, titled "Resistiré México".

== Acting career ==
Paty Cantú appeared as a musical guest in Rebelde, in the 2nd season of El Show de los Sueños and in Verano de Amor starred by Dulce María. However, her acting debut was in the 3rd season of the Mexican series El Pantera as the character of María, a car thief and a love interest of El Pantera. In 2013, she voiced Gossip Girl in Gossip Girl: Acapulco.

== Discography ==
- Me Quedo Sola (2009)
- Afortunadamente No Eres Tú (2010)
- Corazón Bipolar (2012)
- #333 (2018)
- La Mexicana (2020)
- Sagitario (2025)

== Other appearances ==
Title	Year	Album
"Si Crees En Ti"	2009	Tinker Bell and the Lost Treasure Soundtrack
"Libre" (Álvaro Soler featuring Paty Cantú)	2015	Eterno Agosto (International Edition)
"No Llores Por Mí Argentina" (Andrea Bocelli featuring Paty Cantú)	2015	Cinema (Edición en Español)
"No Discutamos" (Juan Gabriel featuring Paty Cantú)	2015	Los Dúo, Vol. 2

== Awards and nominations ==
Los Premios MTVs are awarded annually by MTV Latin America. Cantú has received two nominations. She received two nominations again in the 8th gala of the Premios Oye!

Year	Nominee / work	Award	Result
Premios MTV 2009	Paty Cantú	Best New Artist — North	Won
Premios MTV 2009	Paty Cantú	Breakthrough Artist	Nominated
Premios Oye! 2009	Paty Cantú	Breakthrough of the Year	Nominated
Premios Oye! 2009	Paty Cantú	Best Female Soloist	Nominated
25th Annual Latin Grammy Awards	"A las 3"	Best Pop Song	Nominated
27th Annual Latin Grammy Awards	"Antes de Que el Mundo Se Acabe"	Best Pop/Rock Song	Nominated
