= Ha*Ash videography =

Ha*Ash video discography
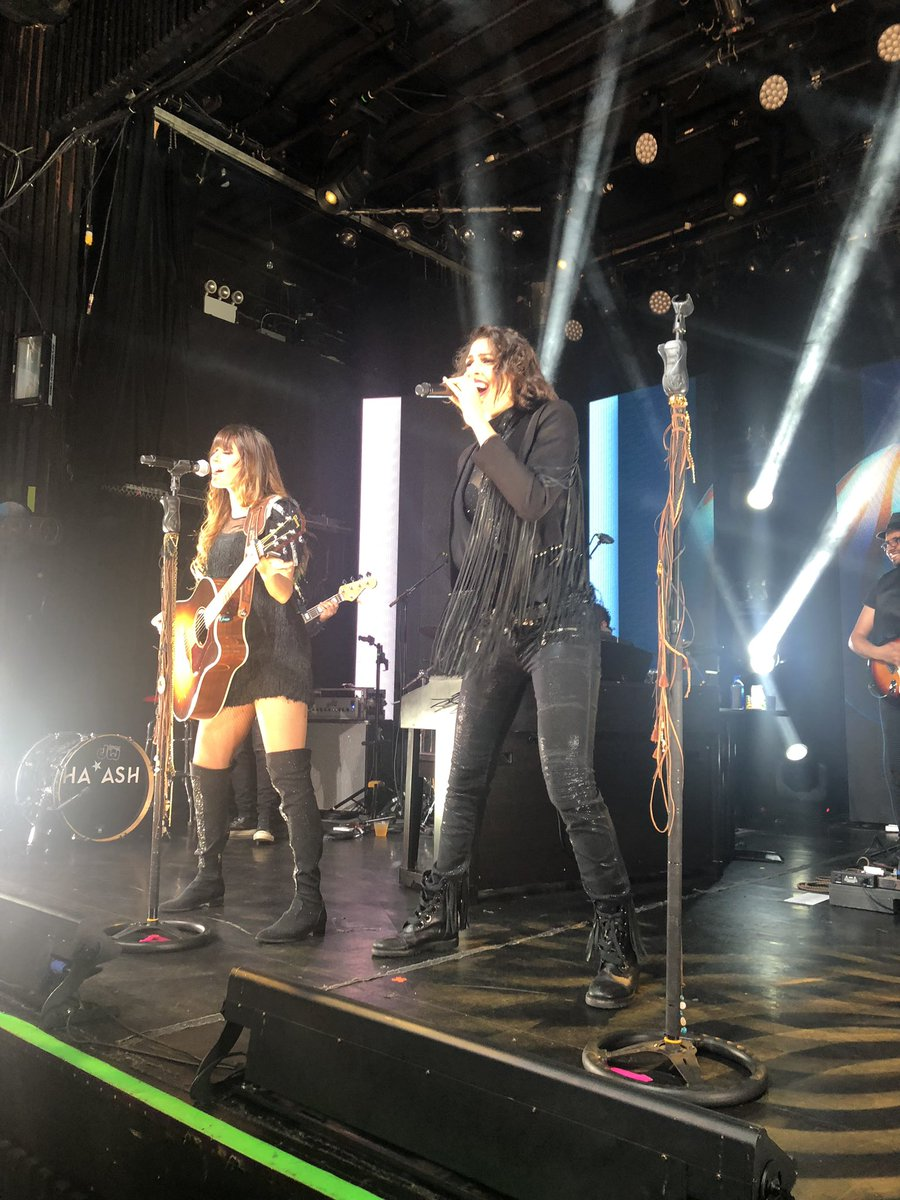
- Ha*Ash performing in New York City on the Gira 100 años contigo on October 13, 2018
- Video albums: 3
- Music videos: 34
- Music video compilations: 3
- Films: 3
- Television: 6

Ha*Ash is an American Latin pop duo that originated in Lake Charles, Louisiana. Their videography consists of three live/video albums, three music video compilations, 34 music videos (27 as a lead artist and seven as a featured artist), three films and six television shows. The music video for "Lo Aprendi de Ti" was the first YouTube ballad in Spanish to reach one billion views.

During 2009, the group worked on film projects such as the Spanish versions of MGM's Igor. In 2012 Ha*Ash participated in the Talent program La voz... México as co-coaches of the Beto Cuevas team. They also participated in Phineas & Ferb (episode 25), a children's television show. In 2015, they participed in the TV program Ven y Baila Quinceañera. Additionally, they worked on film projects such as the Spanish version of the film Sing: Ven y Canta! and Sing 2: ¡Ven y canta de nuevo! In 2022, they participated in the talent program La Voz... México as coaches.

== Filmography ==
Key
†	Denotes films that have not yet been released

List of films and roles
Title	Year	Role		Notes	Ref.
Igor	2008	Hanna: Mela	Ashley: Heidi	Spanish Latin American version (voice)	
Sing: Ven y canta!	2016	Hanna: Rosita	Ashley: Ash	Spanish Latin American version (voice)	
Sing 2: ¡Ven y canta de nuevo!	2021	Hanna: Rosita	Ashley: Ash	Spanish Latin American version (voice)	

== Television ==
List of television appearances and roles
Title	Year	Role	Network	Notes	Ref.
La Voz... México	2012	Themselves	Las Estrellas	Co-coach	
Take Two with Phineas and Ferb	2012	Themselves	Disney Channel	Episode 25 (Latin America version)	
Ven y Baila Quinceañera	2015	Themselves	América Televisión	1 episodes	
Me Pongo de Pie	2015	Themselves	Las Estrellas	Coach	
Viña del Mar International Song Festival	2018	Themselves	Chilevisión; HTV; TNT(LA)	Jury member	
La Voz... México	2022	Themselves	TV Azteca	Coach	

== Video albums ==
=== Concert films and live/video albums ===
Title	Album details	Notes / content
A Tiempo	Released: May 16, 2011; Formats: CD and DVD, 2CD and DVD; Label: Sony Music Entertainment	The standard edition of A Tiempo includes an digipak case edition containing two discs: DVD of the concert and one CD containing 11 tracks.; The deluxe edition includes an Digipak case edition contains the 14 tracks, 14 videos filmed at the Auditorio Nacional in Mexico City and a documentary about Ha*Ash.
Primera Fila: Hecho Realidad	Released: November 11, 2014; Formats: CD/DVD, 2CD/DVD and Blu-ray; Label: Sony Music Entertainment	The Blu-Ray edition of Primera Fila: Hecho Realidad includes the standard CD version, and, on a one-disc Blu-ray, the performance at the Estudios Churubusco, Mexico and in Lake Charles, Louisiana.; A documentary about Ha*Ash.
Ha*Ash: En Vivo	Released: December 6, 2019; Formats: 2CD/DVD; Label: Sony Music Entertainment	Filmed at the Auditorio Nacional in Mexico City, on November 11, 2018, during her world tour Gira 100 Años Contigo.

=== Music video compilations ===
Title	Album details	Notes / content
Ha*Ash	Released: July 19, 2004; Formats: CD and DVD; Label: Columbia Records	The deluxe edition includes an Digipak case edition contains the 10 tracks, 3 music videos of their first three singles: "Odio Amarte", "Estés Donde Estés" and "Te Quedaste"; behind the scenes footage of the videos, karaoke and an interview with Hanna and Ashley about the promotion of their album. The DVD was eventually certified platinum in Mexico.
Habitación Doble	Released: May 3, 2009; Formats: CD and DVD; Label: Sony Music BMG	A special edition of the album, Habitación Doble, was released including four new tracks and one DVD. It features videos of their first three singles: "No Te Quiero Nada", "Lo Que Yo Sé de Ti" and "¿Qué Hago Yo?"; behind the scenes footage of the videos, karaoke and an interview.
30 de Febrero	Released: December 1, 2017; Formats: CD and DVD; Label: Sony Music Entertainment	The standard edition of the album, 30 de Febrero, it features videos of their first single: "100 Años" with Prince Royce and 6 lyric videos of "Ojalá", "30 de Febrero" which featured Abraham Mateo, "Eso No Va a Suceder", "Paleta", "No Pasa Nada", and "Llueve Sobre Mojado".

== Music videos ==
Title	Year	Other performer(s)	Director(s)	Album	Ref.
"Odio Amarte"	2002	—N/a	Unknown	Ha*Ash	
"Estés Donde Estés"	2003	—N/a	Unknown	Ha*Ash	
"Te Quedaste"	2004	—N/a	Unknown	Ha*Ash	
"Amor a Medias"	2005	—N/a	Gustavo Garzón	Mundos Opuestos	
"Me Entrego a Ti"	2005	—N/a	David Ruiz	Mundos Opuestos	
"¿Qué Hago Yo?"	2006	—N/a	Leo Sánchez	Mundos Opuestos	
"Tu Mirada en Mi"	2006	—N/a	David Ruiz	Mundos Opuestos	
"No Te Quiero Nada"	2008	—N/a	Unknown	Habitación Doble	
"Lo Que Yo Sé de Ti"	2008	—N/a	Pablo Davila	Habitación Doble	
"Latente"	2010	—N/a	Unknown	Non-album	
"Impermeable"	2011	—N/a	Fausto Terán	A Tiempo	
"Todo No Fue Suficiente"	2012	—N/a	Unknown	A Tiempo	
"¿De Dónde Sacas Eso?"	2012	—N/a	Unknown	A Tiempo	
"Sé Que Te Vas"	2016	—N/a	Toño Gtz; Gabriel River	Primera Fila: Hecho Realidad	
"100 Años"	2017	Prince Royce	Pablo Croce	30 de Febrero	
"No Pasa Nada"	2018	—N/a	Pablo Croce	30 de Febrero	
"Eso No Va a Suceder"	2018	—N/a	Emiliano Castro	30 de Febrero	
"¿Qué Me Faltó?"	2019	—N/a	Toño Tzinzun	30 de Febrero	
"Vencer el Pasado"	2021	—N/a	Dubraska Arias Requena	Vencer el pasado soundtrack	
"Lo Que un Hombre Debería Saber"	2022	—N/a	Pablo Croce	Haashtag	
"Mejor Que Te Acostumbres"	2022	—N/a	Pablo Croce	Haashtag	
"Serías Tú"	2022	—N/a	Andrés Ibañez Díaz	Haashtag	
«Supongo Que Lo Sabes»	2022	—N/a	Pablo Croce	Haashtag	
«Si Yo Fuera Tú»	2022	—N/a	Nuno Gómez	Haashtag	
«Mi Salida Contigo»	2022	Kenia Os	Unknown	Haashtag	
«Tenían Razón»	2022	—N/a	Pablo Croce	Haashtag	
«Te Acuerdas»	2023	Reik	Nuno Gómes	TBA	

=== As featured artist ===
List of music videos, showing year released and directors
Title	Year	Other performer(s)	Director(s)	Album	Ref.
"Adelante"	2012	Paty Cantú, María León and Rodrigo Dávila	Unknown	Non-album	
"Te Voy a Perder"	2013	Leonel García	Unknown	Todas Mías	
"Te Mueves Tú, Se Mueven Todos"	2014	Reik and David Bisbal	Unknown	Non-album	
"Subiré al Infierno"	2014	Cumbia Ninja	Unknown	Cumbia Ninja	
"Destino o Casualidad"	2017	Melendi	Willy Rodríguez	Quítate las Gafas	
"Fuiste Mía"	2021	MYA	Martin Seipel	TBA	

=== Charity ===
List of charity appearances, showing year released and directors
Title	Year	Other performer(s)	Director(s)	Album	Ref.
"Resistiré México"	2020	Various Artists for Mexico (Note: Composed of Ha*Ash, Aida Cuevas, Arath Herce, Axel Muñiz, Benny Ibarra, Belinda, Camila, Caztro, Chucho Rivas, Cristian Castro, DLD, Edith Márquez, Gloria Trevi, Horacio Palencia, Kaia Lana, Kinky, Leonel Garcia, Lila Downs, Lupe Esparza, María José, María León, MC Davo, Mijares, Mœnia, Paty Cantú, Río Roma, Rodrigo Davila, Sandra Echeverría, Ximena Sariñana and Yahir.)	Unknown	Non-album	

== Other videos ==
Title	Year	Other performer(s)	Director(s)	Album	Ref.
"Te Dejo en Libertad" (Live) (Note: The single does not have an official video.)	2011	—N/a	Unknown	A Tiempo	
"Perdón, Perdón" (Live)	2014	—N/a	Nahuel Lerena	Primera Fila: Hecho Realidad	
"Lo Aprendí de Ti" (Live)	2015	—N/a	Nahuel Lerena	Primera Fila: Hecho Realidad	
"Ex de Verdad" (Live)	2015	—N/a	Nahuel Lerena	Primera Fila: Hecho Realidad	
"Dos Copas de Más" (Live)	2015	—N/a	Nahuel Lerena	Primera Fila: Hecho Realidad	
"No Te Quiero Nada" (Live)	2015	Axel	Nahuel Lerena	Primera Fila: Hecho Realidad	
"No Pasa Nada" (Lyric music video)	2017	—N/a	Diego Álvarez	30 de Febrero	
"Ojalá" (Lyric music video)	2017	—N/a	Diego Álvarez	30 de Febrero	
"Eso No Va a Suceder" (Lyric music video)	2017	—N/a	Diego Álvarez	30 de Febrero	
"Llueve Sobre Mojado" (Lyric music video)	2017	—N/a	Diego Álvarez	30 de Febrero	
"Paleta" (Lyric music video)	2017	—N/a	Diego Álvarez	30 de Febrero	
"30 de Febrero" (Lyric music video)	2017	Abraham Mateo	Diego Álvarez	30 de Febrero	
"Si Tú No Vuelves" (Live)	2019	Miguel Bosé	Gonzalo Ferrari	Ha*Ash: En Vivo	
"The Unforgiven" (Metallica cover)	2021	—N/a	Unknown	The Metallica Black List	

=== As featured artist ===
List of videos, showing year released and directors
Title	Year	Other performer(s)	Director(s)	Album	Ref.
"Mi Niña Mujer" (Live)	2016	Los Ángeles Azules	Diego Álvarez	De Plaza en Plaza	
"Te Aprovechas" (Live)	2017	Alicia Villarreal	Unknown	La Villarreal	
"Perdón, Perdón" (Live)	2018	Los Ángeles Azules	Diego Álvarez	Esto Si es Cumbia	
"Rosas en Mi Almohada" (Live)	2019	María José	Unknown	Conexión	
"Lo Aprendí de Tí" (Live)	2022	Arthur Hanlon	Unknown	Piano y Mujer II	

== See also ==
- Ha*Ash discography
- List of songs recorded by Ha*Ash
