= Ha*Ash discography =

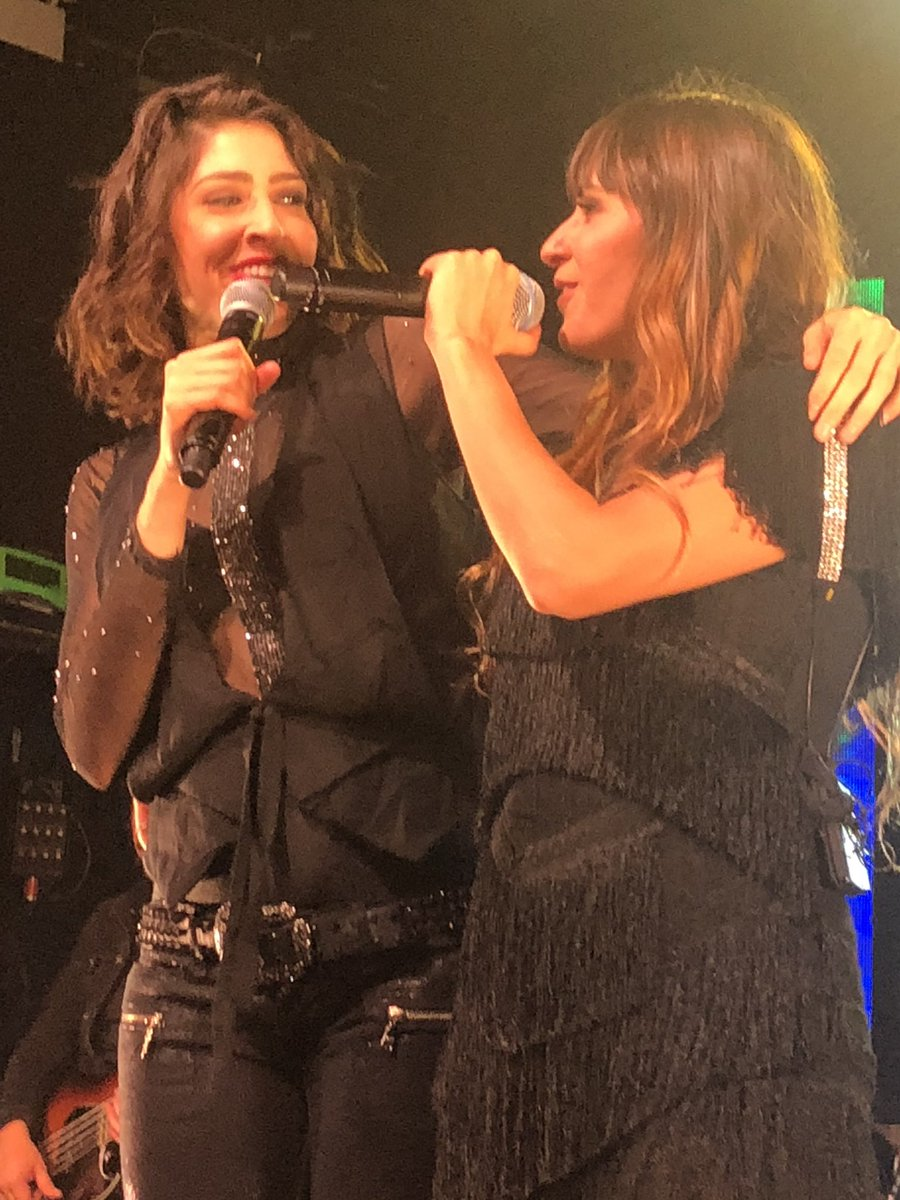
- Ha*Ash performs in New York on the Gira 100 años contigo on October 13, 2018.
- Studio albums: 6
- EPs: 2
- Live albums: 2
- Singles: 37
- Promotional singles: 10

American Latin pop duo Ha*Ash composed of sisters Ashley Grace and Hanna Nicole have released six studio albums, two live albums, two extended plays (EP), 37 singles (31 as a lead artist and 6 as a featured artist) and 10 promotional single.

They recorded their self-titled first album Ha*Ash with the Mexican producer Áureo Baqueiro in 2003. In April, they released their first single, "Odio Amarte". The second single was "Estés Donde Estés" which was released in 2003. The same year, a third single was released: the ballad "Te Quedaste". This was followed by their second album Mundos Opuestos again with Áureo Baqueiro. "Amor a Medias" was the first single and reached number four on the Mexican Chart in April 2006. The song was chosen to promote Sony's products. "Me Entrego a Ti" was the second single which was written by Colombian artist Soraya and had the same success.

Early 2008, they recorded their third album, Habitación Doble, in Nashville, Tennessee. This album have a collaboration of the singer Brandi Carlile with the song "Already Home", their first English song recorded by them (like officially). A Tiempo is the fourth studio album. It was released under the label Sony Music Latin on May 16, 2011. A Tiempo was recorded over a period of almost a year between Los Angeles, California and Milan, Italy. Ha*Ash worked with producer Áureo Baqueiro and invited Michele Canova.

After completing the tour for A Tiempo in 2013, it was revealed that Ha*Ash had begun production of the album Primera Fila: Hecho Realidad, which was released in 2014. Ha*Ash is the youngest group to record a Primera Fila concept album. The album includes material from her past four studio albums as well as 8 newly recorded songs. The CD/DVD has images from their hometown in Louisiana and a live concert filmed in Estudios Churubusco, Mexico City.

30 de Febrero was released on December 1, 2017, by Sony Music Latin. The album features artists with Prince Royce and Abraham Mateo on the title track. "100 Años" with Prince Royce was the first single and reached number one on the Mexican Chart in December 2017. On October 20, 2017, Ha*Ash released the video for the album's lead single. On December 6, 2019, the duo released a live album, entitled Ha*Ash: En Vivo, based on a recording from the concert at the Auditorio Nacional in Mexico on November 11, 2018.

== Albums ==
=== Studio albums ===
List of studio albums, with selected chart positions and certifications
Title	Album details	Peak chart positions		Sales	Certifications
Title	Album details	US Latin	MEX	Sales	Certifications
Ha*Ash	Released: May 11, 2003; Formats: CD; Label: Columbia Records	19	3	World: 350,000 (Note: Worldwide sales figures for Ha*Ash as of April 2011.)	AMPROFON: Platinum + Gold
Mundos Opuestos	Released: September 27, 2005; Formats: CD; Label: Sony Music BMG	—	8	World: 500,000 (Note: Worldwide sales figures for Mundos Opuestos as of April 2011.)	AMPROFON: Platinum + Gold
Habitación Doble	Released: August 1, 2008; Formats: CD, digital download; Label: Sony Music BMG	14	6	World: 450,000 (Note: Worldwide sales figures for Ha*Ash as of July 2009.)	AMPROFON: Gold
A Tiempo	Released: May 16, 2011; Formats: CD, CD and DVD, digital download; Label: Sony Music Entertainment	—	4		AMPROFON: 3× Platinum
30 de Febrero	Released: December 1, 2017; Formats: CD, CD and DVD, digital download, streaming; Label: Sony Music Entertainment	11	3		AMPROFON: Platinum + Gold
Haashtag	Released: September 1, 2022; Formats: CD, digital download, streaming; Label: Sony Music Entertainment	—	—		
"—" denotes a recording that did not chart or was not released in that territory.

Edition Deluxe

- Ha*Ash - Edition Deluxe DVD (July 19, 2004) – AMPROFON: Platinum (sales: 150,000).

=== Live albums ===
List of live albums, with selected chart positions and certifications
Title	Album details	Peak chart positions			Sales	Certifications
Title	Album details	US Latin	MEX	SPN	Sales	Certifications
Primera Fila: Hecho Realidad	Released: November 11, 2014; Formats: CD and DVD, CD and Blu-ray, digital download; Label: Sony Music Latin	16	1	52	World: 600,000 (Note: Worldwide sales figures for Primera Fila: Hecho Realidad as of December 2018.); MEX: 240,000; CEN: 20,000	AMPROFON: Diamond + 2× Platinum
Ha*Ash: En Vivo	Released: December 6, 2019; Formats: CD and DVD, digital download; Label: Sony Music Latin	—	1	—		
"—" denotes a recording that did not chart or was not released in that territory.

== Extended plays ==
Title
Details
Notes
Spotify Singles (Note: A live EP recorded exclusively for Spotify.)
- Released: 3 October 2018
- Label: Sony Music Entertainment México
- Format: Streaming
Track listing
- No.	Title	Length
  1.	"No Pasa Nada"	3:17
  2.	"Adiós Amor"	3:22
  Total length:		6:39
Lo Más Romántico de (Note: Digital-only 6-track EP released in 2021 by Sony Músic Mexico.)
- Released: 10 February 2021
- Label: Sony Music Entertainment México
- Format: Digital download, streaming
Track listing
- No.	Title	Length
  1.	"Lo Aprendí de Ti (Primera Fila)"	3:17
  2.	"Perdón, Perdón (Primera Fila)"	3:46
  3.	"Ex de Verdad (Primera Fila)"	3:32
  4.	"¿Qué Hago Yo? (Primera Fila)"	4:07
  5.	"No Pasa Nada"	3:14
  6.	"Odio Amarte"	3:30
  Total length:		21:29

== Singles ==
=== As lead artist ===
List of Spanish singles, with selected chart positions and certifications, showing year released and album name
Title	Year	Peak chart positions						Certifications	Album
Title	Year	US Latin Pop	US Latin Airplay	US Hot Latin	MEX	MEX Airplay	MEX Esp. Airplay	Certifications	Album
"Odio Amarte"	2002	—	—	—	2	—	—		Ha*Ash
"Estés Donde Estés"	2003	9	14	14	1	—	—		Ha*Ash
"Te Quedaste"	2003	17	28	28	5	—	—		Ha*Ash
"Soy Mujer"	2004	—	—	—	7	—	—		Ha*Ash
"Si Pruebas una Vez"	2004	—	—	—	5	—	—		Ha*Ash
"Amor a Medias"	2005	—	—	—	4	—	—		Mundos Opuestos
"Me Entrego a Ti"	2005	—	—	—	4	—	—		Mundos Opuestos
"¿Qué Hago Yo?"	2006	—	—	—	1	—	36	AMPROFON: Platinum	Mundos Opuestos
"Tu Mirada en Mi"	2006	24	—	—	—	—	—		Mundos Opuestos
"No Te Quiero Nada"	2008	6	14	14	1	—	31		Habitación Doble
"Lo Que Yo Sé de Ti"	2008	—	—	—	1	1	1		Habitación Doble
"Tú y Yo Volvemos al Amor"	2009	—	—	—	—	31	20		Habitación Doble
"Impermeable"	2011	—	—	—	1	6	1	AMPROFON: Gold	A Tiempo
"Te Dejo en Libertad"	2011	29	—	—	1	1	1	AMPROFON: Platinum + Gold	A Tiempo
"Todo No Fue Suficiente"	2012	—	—	—	4	11	2		A Tiempo
"¿De Dónde Sacas Eso?"	2012	—	—	—	3	9	4	AMPROFON: Gold	A Tiempo
"Perdón, Perdón"	2014	17	35	36	1	2	1	AMPROFON: Diamond + 2× Platinum + Gold	Primera Fila: Hecho Realidad
"Lo Aprendí de Ti"	2015	19	48	32	1	7	1	AMPROFON: Diamond + 3× Platinum	Primera Fila: Hecho Realidad
"Ex de Verdad"	2015	—	—	—	1	—	33	AMPROFON: Diamond + Gold	Primera Fila: Hecho Realidad
"No Te Quiero Nada" (featuring Axel)	2015	—	—	—	1	—	—	AMPROFON: Platinum	Primera Fila: Hecho Realidad
"Dos Copas de Más"	2015	—	—	—	3	16	3	AMPROFON: Platinum	Primera Fila: Hecho Realidad
"Sé Que Te Vas"	2016	—	—	—	16	—	28	AMPROFON: Gold	Primera Fila: Hecho Realidad
"100 Años" (with Prince Royce)	2017	24	50	—	1	3	1	AMPROFON: 4× Platinum	30 de Febrero
"No Pasa Nada"	2018	—	—	—	2	13	4	AMPROFON: 4× Platinum + Gold	30 de Febrero
"Eso No Va a Suceder"	2018	34	—	—	1	6	1	AMPROFON: Platinum + Gold	30 de Febrero
"¿Qué Me Faltó?"	2019	—	—	—	2	—	—	AMPROFON: 2× Platinum	30 de Febrero
"Si Tú No Vuelves" (featuring Miguel Bosé)	2019	—	—	—	1	—	—	AMPROFON: Gold	Ha*Ash: En Vivo
"Lo Que un Hombre Debería Saber"	2022	16	—	—	1	3	1	AMPROFON: Gold	Haashtag
"Supongo Que Lo Sabes"	2022	19	—	—	1	—	—	AMPROFON: Platinum; RIAA: Gold (Latin)	Haashtag
"Mi Salida Contigo" (Ha*Ash with Kenia Os)	2022	16	—	—	1	—	—	AMPROFON: Gold	Haashtag
"Te Acuerdas" (Ha*Ash with Reik)	2023	18	—	—	9	—	—		TBA
"—" denotes items that did not chart or were not released.

=== Promotional singles ===
List of promotional singles, with selected chart positions, showing year released and album name
Title	Year	Peak chart positions	Album
Title	Year	MEX	Album
"I Want to Be a Cowboy's Sweetheart" (Note: Patsy Montana cover.)	2003	—	Non-album single
"Si Tú Quieres Ser"	2005	—	Mundos Opuestos
"Latente"	2010	—	Non-album single
"Te Dejo En Libertad" (Note: "Te Dejo En Libertad" only appears on the Latin and Europe edition of Primera Fila: Hecho Realidad. Only released in Spain.) (featuring Maldita Nerea)	2016	—	Primera Fila: Hecho Realidad
"Rosas en Mi Almohada" (María José featuring Ha*Ash)	2020	3	Conexión
"The Unforgiven"	2021	—	The Metallica Blacklist
"Vencer el pasado"	2021	—	Vencer el pasado (soundtrack)
"Mejor Que Te Acostumbres"	2022	—	Haashtag
"Serías Tú"	2022	—	Haashtag
"Si Yo Fuera Tú"	2022	—	Haashtag

=== As featured artist ===
List of Spanish singles, with selected chart positions and certifications, showing year released and album name
Title	Year	Peak chart positions					Certifications	Album
Title	Year	US Latin Pop	ARG	MEX Esp. Airplay	MEX Airplay	SPN	Certifications	Album
"Adelante" (Paty Cantú with María León, Rodrigo Dávila and Ha*Ash)	2012	—	—	—	—	—		Non-album single
"Te Voy A Perder" (Leonel García featuring Ha*Ash)	2013	—	—	2	9	—		Todas Mías
"Mi Niña Mujer" (Los Ángeles Azules featuring Ha*Ash)	2016	—	—	11	31	—		De Plaza en Plaza
"Destino o Casualidad" (Melendi featuring Ha*Ash)	2017	38	—	10	32	56	RIAA: Gold (Latin); AMPROFON: Platinum; PROMUSICAE: Platinum	Quítate Las Gafas
"Resistiré México" (among Artists for Mexico) (Note: Composed of Ha*Ash, Aida Cuevas, Arath Herce, Axel Muñiz, Benny Ibarra, Belinda, Camila, Caztro, Chucho Rivas, Cristian Castro, DLD, Edith Márquez, Gloria Trevi, Horacio Palencia, Kaia Lana, Kinky, Leonel Garcia, Lila Downs, Lupe Esparza, María José, María León, MC Davo, Mijares, Mœnia, Paty Cantú, Río Roma, Rodrigo Davila, Sandra Echeverria, Ximena Sariñana and Yahir.)	2020	—	—	4	15	— (Note: "Resistiré México" did not enter the PROMUSICAE Chart, but peaked at number one on the Spain Digital Song Sales Chart.)		Non-album single
"Fuiste Mía" (MYA with Ha*Ash)	2021	—	74	—	—	—		Suena MYA!
"—" denotes items that did not chart or were not released.

== Other songs ==
List of other songs showing year released and album name
Title	Year	Certifications	Album
"Ojalá"	2017	AMPROFON: Gold	30 de Febrero
"30 de Febrero" (featuring Abraham Mateo)	2017	AMPROFON: Platinum	30 de Febrero

== Guest appearances ==
List of other appearances, showing year released and album name
Title	Year	Other artist(s)	Album	Ref.
"He Venido a Pedirte Perdón"	2003	Víctor García	Víctor García	
"Llévate"	2004	Kalimba	Aerosul	
"Estaré"	2005	Kabah	El Pop Ha Muerto Viva el Pop	
"Tan Lejos"	2009	Melocos	Somos	
"Mujer Contra Mujer"	2010	—	Tributo a Ana, José y Nacho	
"Temblando"	2011	Hombres G	En La Playa	
"Úneme" (solo Ashley Grace)	2012	Dan Masciarelli	Dile	
"Te Amaré Más Allá"	2013	Cristian Castro	Primera Fila - Día 1	
"Lo Pasado Pasado"	2014	José José	Duetos, vol 2	
"Te Mueves Tú, Se Mueven Todos"	2014	Reik, David Bisbal	Non-album	
"Te Aprovechas"	2017	Alicia Villarreal	La Villarreal	
"Perdón, Perdón"	2018	Los Ángeles Azules	Esto Sí Es Cumbia	
"Lo Aprendí de Ti	2022	Arthur Hanlon	Piano y Mujer II	
"Bridge Over Troubled Water	2022	Arthur Hanlon	Piano y Mujer II	
"We Are Going to Make It Tonight (Outro Jam)	2022	Arthur Hanlon, Debi Nova, Ivy Queen, Lupita Infante & Catalina García	Piano y Mujer II	

== Soundtracks ==
List of other appearances, showing year released and album name
Title	Year	Other artist(s)	Album	Ref.
"Un Amigo Así"	2003	—	Magos y Gigantes	
"Código Postal"	2006	—	Código Postal	
"Cree y Atrévete"	2009	—	Tinker Bell	
"Subiré al Infierno"	2014	Cumbia Ninja	Cumbia Ninja	
"Al Fin" (solo Ashley Grace)	2016	—	Sing: Ven y Canta!	
"Hasta Que Regreses"	2016	—	El regreso de Lucas	
"Vencer el Pasado"	2021	—	Vencer el pasado	

== See also ==
- Ha*Ash videography
- List of songs recorded by Ha*Ash
