= Gira mi salida contigo =

2022–24 concert tour by Ha*Ash

- World tour by Ha*Ash
- Promotional poster for the tour
- Associated album: Haashtag
- Start date: September 2, 2022
- End date: TBA
- Legs: 5
- No. of shows: 76 in North America; 11 in South America; 6 in Central America; 5 in Europe; 98 in total

Ha*Ash concert chronology
- Gira 100 años contigo (2018–22); Gira mi salida contigo (2022–24); ...

Gira mi salida contigo is the seventh concert tour by American group Ha*Ash in support of the act's sixth studio album, Haashtag (2022). The tour began in Puebla, Mexico on September 2, 2022. The concert on October 21 at Auditorio Nacional, were broadcast live on Star+ exclusively in Latin America.

== Background and development ==
Following the release of Haashtag. Ha*Ash announced they would embark on Gira Mi Salida Contigo, which began at Puebla on 2 September 2022. The tour was announced by Ha*Ash on their social media in June 2022, revealing 19 initial tour dates in 19 cities across Mexico. After, seven additional dates in Mexico were added after most tickets sold out. The setlist includes songs of the new album but also older singles from Ha*Ash, Mundos Opuestos, Habitación Doble, A Tiempo, Primera Fila: Hecho Realidad and 30 de Febrero.

The third part of the tour was announced on October 10, 2022 with 21 shows in United States. The second part "Latin America" was announced on November 3, 2022 with 15 shows in South America and Central America. Four more shows were then added to the Latin America "due to popular demand". On May 31, an eighth and ninth tour date in National Auditorium in Mexico City was announced due to "overwhelming demand".

== Opening acts ==
- Alé Zeguer – September 8, 9 and 22, 2022
- Sofia Delfino – October 21 and 22, 2022
- Sammy James – November 17 and 18, 2022
- Dicapo – February 18, 2023
- Nella Rojas – March 30, 2023
- Mar Lucas – October 20 and 21, 2023

== Special guests ==
- Alé Zeguer – September 9, 2022: "Tenían razón".
- Marcela López – September 29, 2022: "Tenían razón".
- Maria José Loyola – June 9, 2023: "Tenían razón".
- Mar Lucas – June 23, 2023 and October 20, 2023: "Yo Nunca, Nunca".
- Mario Bautista – October 20, 2023: "100 Años".
- Matisse – October 20, 2023: "Sé que te vas".

== Set list ==
This is the setlist for the show at Auditorio Nacional in Mexico City on February 18, 2023. It is not representative of every show on the tour.

1. "Lo Que un Hombre Debería Saber"
2. "Ojalá"
3. "Dos Copas de Más"
4. "Demasiado Para Ti"
5. "Supongo Que Lo Sabes"
6. "Eso No Va a Suceder"
7. "Te lo Dije", "¿Qué Me Faltó?", "Destino o Casualidad", "Sé Que Te Vas"
8. "Ex de Verdad"
9. "Impermeable", "Estés Donde Estés"
10. "Tenían Razón"
11. "Mi Salida Contigo"
12. "No Pasa Nada"
13. "Te Dejo en Libertad"
14. "Mejor Que Te Acostumbres"
15. "100 Años"
16. "Perdón, Perdón"
17. "No Te Quiero Nada"
18. "30 de Febrero"
19. "¿Qué Hago Yo?"

Encore

19. "Lo Aprendí de Ti"
20. "Odio Amarte"

== Tour dates ==
List of concerts, showing date, city, country
Date	City	Country	Venue	Ref
Mexico
September 2, 2022	Puebla	Mexico	Auditorio GNP	
September 8, 2022	Guadalajara	Mexico	Auditorio Telmex	
September 9, 2022	Guadalajara	Mexico	Auditorio Telmex	
September 22, 2022	Querétaro	Mexico	Plaza Santa María	
September 23, 2022	Morelia	Mexico	Plaza de Toros Morelia	
September 24, 2022	León	Mexico	Velaria	
September 29, 2022	Monterrey	Mexico	Auditorio Citibanamex	
September 30, 2022	Monterrey	Mexico	Auditorio Citibanamex	
October 1, 2022	Torreón	Mexico	Coliseo Centenario de Torreón	
October 7, 2022	Mérida	Mexico	Foro GNP	
October 8, 2022	Veracruz	Mexico	World Trade Center	
October 14, 2022	CD Júarez	Mexico	Centro de Convenciones Anitias	
October 15, 2022	Chihuahua	Mexico	Plaza de Todos	
October 21, 2022	Mexico City	Mexico	Auditorio Nacional	
October 22, 2022	Mexico City	Mexico	Auditorio Nacional	
October 28, 2022	Mexicali	Mexico	Centro Estatal de las Artes	
October 29, 2022	Tijuana	Mexico	El Trompo	
November 4, 2022	San Luis Potosí	Mexico	El Domo	
November 5, 2022	Aguascalientes	Mexico	Plaza de Toros	
November 11, 2022	Cancún	Mexico	Plaza de Toros	
November 17, 2022	México City	Mexico	Auditorio Nacional	
November 18, 2022	México City	Mexico	Auditorio Nacional	
December 1, 2022	Sinaloa	Mexico	CUM Los Mochis	
December 2, 2022	Mazatlán	Mexico	Mazatlán International Center	
December 8, 2022	Hermosillo	Mexico	Expoforum	
December 10, 2022	Culiacán	Mexico	Estacionamiento Estadio Tomateros	
Latin America
February 1, 2023	Panama City	Panama	Centro de Convenciones Figali	
February 3, 2023	San José	Costa Rica	Parque Viva	
February 9, 2023	San Salvador	El Salvador	Complejo Estadio Cuscatlan	
February 10, 2023	Tegucigalpa	Honduras	Ingenieros Coliseum	
February 11, 2023	Guatemala City	Guatemala	Futeca Cardales de Cayalá	
February 18, 2023	Mexico City	Mexico	Auditorio Nacional	
February 22, 2023	Bogotá	Colombia	Movistar Arena	
February 24, 2023	Quito	Ecuador	Coliseo Rumiñahui	
February 25, 2023	Guayaquil	Ecuador	Coliseo Voltaire Paladines Polo	
February 26, 2023	Guayaquil	Ecuador	Coliseo Voltaire Paladines Polo	
March 3, 2023	Santiago	Chile	Movistar Arena	
March 4, 2023	Rancagua	Chile	Gran Arena Monticello	
March 5, 2023	Lima	Peru	Club Cultura Lima Chorillos	
March 9, 2023	Montevideo	Uruguay	Antel Arena	
March 11, 2023	Buenos Aires	Argentina	Luna Park	
March 12, 2023	Buenos Aires	Argentina	Luna Park	
March 30, 2023	Caracas	Venezuela	Terraza del C.C.C.T.	
April 1, 2023	Santo Domingo	Dominican Republic	Teatro La Fiesta	
April 2, 2023	San Juan	Puerto Rico	Coca-Cola Music Hall	
United States
April 7, 2023	Miami	United States	James L Knight Center	
April 8, 2023	Orlando	United States	House of Blues	
April 9, 2023	Atlanta	United States	Coca-Cola Roxy	
April 12, 2023	New York City	United States	Beacon Theatre	
April 13, 2023	Washington	United States	The Howard	
April 15, 2023	Rosemont	United States	Rosemont Theatre	
April 20, 2023	Houston	United States	Smart Financial Centre	
April 21, 2023	Irving	United States	The Pavilion Toyota Music	
April 22, 2023	El Paso	United States	Abraham Chavez Theatre	
April 23, 2023	Phoenix	United States	Arizona Financial Theatre	
May 2, 2023 (Note: Feria Nacional de San Marcos 2023.)	Aguascalientes	Mexico	Foro de las Estrellas	
May 11, 2023	Seattle	United States	Moore Theatre	
May 14, 2023	Denver	United States	Paramount Theatre	
May 18, 2023	Austin	United States	Moody Amphitheater	
May 19, 2023	Laredo	United States	Sames Auto Arena	
May 20, 2023	Hidalgo	United States	Payne Arena	
May 21, 2023	San Antonio	United States	Majestic Theatre	
May 26, 2023	Inglewood	United States	YouTube Theater	
May 27, 2023	San Francisco	United States	The Masonic	
May 28, 2023	Stockton	United States	Bob Hope Theatre	
North America – Legs II
June 2, 2023	Toluca	Mexico	Teatro Morelos	
June 3, 2023	Querétaro	Mexico	Auditorio Josefa Ortiz	
June 9, 2023	Mexico City	Mexico	Auditorio Nacional	
June 10, 2023	Mexico City	Mexico	Auditorio Nacional	
June 22, 2023	Monterrey	Mexico	Auditorio Citibanamex	
June 23, 2023	Monterrey	Mexico	Auditorio Citibanamex	
June 29, 2023	Guadalajara	Mexico	Auditorio Telmex	
June 30, 2023	Guadalajara	Mexico	Auditorio Telmex	
July 7, 2023 (Note: Feria de San Buenaventura 2023.)	San Buenaventura	Mexico	Recinto Feria de San Buenaventura	
July 13, 2023 (Note: Feria de Playa del Carmen 2023.)	Playa del Carmen	Mexico	Recinto Ferial	
July 14, 2023	Saltillo	Mexico	Parque Las Maravillas	
July 26, 2023 (Note: Feria Nacional Francisco Villa Durango 2023.)	Durango	Mexico	Velaría FENADU	
July 28, 2023 (Note: Feria de Tulancingo 2023.)	Tulancingo	Mexico	Palenque Tulancingo	
September 2, 2023	Mexicali	Mexico	Plaza Calafia	
September 3, 2023 (Note: Feria Tijuana 2023.)	Tijuana	Mexico	Audiorama de Las Estrellas	
September 9, 2023	Xalapa	Mexico	Nido del Halcón	
September 29, 2023	Tuxtla Gutiérrez	Mexico	Foro Chiapas	
September 30, 2023	Villahermosa	Mexico	Palenque de Gallos	
October 7, 2023	San Luis Potosí	Mexico	Plaza de Toros	
October 13, 2023	Mérida	Mexico	Foro GNP	
October 18, 2023 (Note: Festival SEJUVE 2.0.)	Querétaro	Mexico	Auditorio Josefa Ortiz	
October 20, 2023	Mexico City	Mexico	Auditorio Nacional	
October 21, 2023	Mexico City	Mexico	Auditorio Nacional	
October 24, 2023 (Note: Fiestas de Octubre.)	Guadalajara	Mexico	Auditorio Benito Juárez	
October 28, 2023	Puebla	Mexico	Auditorio CCU	
November 11, 2023	Pachuca	Mexico	Auditorio Explanada	
November 17, 2023	Mérida	Mexico	Foro GNP	
March 2, 2024 (Note: Bésame Mucho Festival Austin.)	Austin	United States	Circuit of the Americas	
Europe
April 18, 2024	Valencia	Spain	Repvblicca	
April 19, 2024	Murcia	Spain	Mamba!	
April 21, 2024	Barcelona	Spain	Palau Sant Jordi	
April 22, 2024	Madrid	Spain	WiZink Center	
April 26, 2024	Málaga	Spain	París 15	
