= Gira 100 años contigo =

2018–22 concert tour by Ha*Ash

- World tour by Ha*Ash
- Promotional poster for the tour
- Associated album: 30 de Febrero
- Start date: February 24, 2018
- End date: September 1, 2022
- Legs: 4
- No. of shows: 97 in North America; 5 in Europe; 21 in South America; 5 in Central America; 128 in total

Ha*Ash concert chronology
- 1F Hecho Realidad Tour (2015–17); Gira 100 años contigo (2018–22); Gira mi salida contigo (2022–24)

Gira 100 años contigo was the sixth concert tour by American group Ha*Ash in support of the act's fifth studio album, 30 de Febrero (2017). The tour began in Viña del Mar, Chile on February 24, 2018, and concluded in Puebla, Mexico on September 1, 2022. A live recording was released on 6 December 2019 under the title Ha*Ash: En Vivo.

== Background and development ==
Following the release of 30 de Febrero. Ha*Ash announced they would embark on their sixth headlining concert tour, following the 1F Hecho Realidad Tour. The tour was announced by Ha*Ash on her social media in November 2017, with the tour beginning on February 24, 2018. The tour was continues in the Auditorio Nacional of Mexico City with 3 shows. The tour included South America, North America and Europe.

At some shows, Ha*Ash covered songs such as "Adios Amor" by Christian Nodal. Footage from the concert at the Auditorio Nacional in México were recorded and i will released on a DVD in 2019. The setlist includes songs of the new album but also older singles from Ha*Ash, Mundos Opuestos, Habitación Doble, A Tiempo and Primera Fila: Hecho Realidad.

== Broadcasts and recordings ==
A double disc CD and DVD, titled Ha*Ash: En Vivo was released on December 6, 2019, featuring the performance recorded on November 11, 2018. The show filmed at the Auditorio Nacional in Mexico City, Mexico. The collection featured the full concert, a behind-the-scenes feature, along with an audio CD of the concert.

== Opening acts ==
- Raquel Sofía – March 14 and 15, 2018 and April 20, 2018.
- Forer – June 1, 2018.
- Bridget González – October 23, 2018.
- Techy Fatule – October 27, 2018.
- Felix y Gil – November 11, 2018.
- Carolina Ross – November 19, 2018.
- Arcano – December 14, 2018.
- Coastcity – February 1 and 2, 2019.
- Chucho Rivas – April 4 and 5, 2019.
- Sergio Vivar – August 24, 2019.

== Special guests ==
- Prince Royce – February 24, 2018 and November 11, 2018: "100 Años".
- Melendi – June 1, 2018; June 3, 2018 and November 11, 2018: "Destino o Casualidad".
- Miguel Bosé – November 11, 2018: "Si Tu No Vuelves".
- Maria José Loyola – February 1 and 2, 2019: "Rosas en Mi Almohada".
- Soledad Pastorutti – February 12, 2019: "Te Dejo en Libertad".
- Jesse & Joy (Note: Shot with Jesse and Joy) – August 24, 2019: "La de la Mala Suerte".

== Set list ==
This is the setlist for the show at The Fillmore Miami Beach at Jackie Gleason Theater in Miami Beach, United States on October 21, 2018. It is not representative of every show on the tour.

1. Estés Donde Estés (Intro)
2. ¿De Dónde Sacas Eso?
3. Amor a Medias
4. Ojalá
5. Sé Que Te Vas
6. Todo No Fue Suficiente
7. ¿Qué Me Faltó?
8. Destino o Casualidad
9. Dos Copas de Más
10. Eso No Va a Suceder
11. ¿Qué Hago Yo?
12. No Pasa Nada
13. Adiós Amor (Christian Nodal cover)
14. Te Dejo en Libertad
15. Ex de Verdad
16. 100 Años
17. Lo Aprendí de Ti
18. No Te Quiero Nada

Encore

19. Perdón, Perdón
20. 30 de Febrero
Notes

Notes

- During the concert in Auditorio Nacional on May 23, 2018, Fórum Mundo Impereal on March 31, 2018, Plaza de Toros on April 19, 2018, Auditorio Banamex on May 18, 2018, The Rialto Theatre de Tucson on April 12, 2018 and The Plaza Theatre, El Paso on May 10, 2018 "Paleta" were added to the setlist.

Setlist 1 - Feb/3/2018 - Mar/31/2018

Setlist

1. Estés Donde Estés (Intro)
2. ¿De Dónde Sacas Eso?
3. Amor a Medias
4. Ojalá
5. Sé Que Te Vas
6. Todo No Fue Suficiente
7. ¿Qué Me Faltó?
8. Destino o Casualidad
9. Tu y Yo Volvemos al Amor (Mónica Naranjo cover)
10. Dos Copas De Más
11. Eso No Va a Suceder
12. ¿Qué Hago Yo?
13. Me Entrego a Ti
14. No Pasa Nada
15. Te Dejo En Libertad
16. Ex De Verdad
17. 100 Años
18. Lo Aprendí De Ti
19. Odio Amarte
20. No Te Quiero Nada

Encore

21. Perdón, Perdón
22. 30 de Febrero

Setlist 2 - Apr/3/2018 - Nov/23/2018

Setlist

1. Estés Donde Estés (Intro)
2. ¿De Dónde Sacas Eso?
3. Amor a Medias
4. Ojalá
5. Sé Que Te Vas
6. Todo No Fue Suficiente
7. ¿Qué Me Faltó?
8. Destino o Casualidad
9. Dos Copas De Más
10. Eso No Va a Suceder
11. ¿Qué Hago Yo?
12. Me Entrego a Ti
13. No Pasa Nada
14. Te Dejo En Libertad
15. Ex De Verdad
16. 100 Años
17. Lo Aprendí De Ti
18. Odio Amarte
19. No Te Quiero Nada

Encore

20. Perdón, Perdón
21. 30 de Febrero

Setlist 3 - Nov/24/2018 - 2019

Setlist

1. Estés Donde Estés (Intro)
2. ¿De Dónde Sacas Eso?
3. Amor a Medias
4. Ojalá
5. Sé Que Te Vas
6. Todo No Fue Suficiente
7. ¿Qué me faltó?
8. Destino o Casualidad
9. Dos Copas De Más
10. Eso No Va a Suceder
11. ¿Qué Hago Yo?
12. No Pasa Nada
13. Adiós Amor (Christian Nodal cover) (in North America)
14. Te Dejo En Libertad
15. Ex De Verdad
16. 100 Años
17. Lo Aprendí De Ti
18. Odio Amarte (in México)
19. No Te Quiero Nada

Encore

20. Perdón, Perdón
21. 30 de Febrero

== Tour dates ==
List of concerts, showing date, city, country, tickets sold.
Date	City	Country	Venue	Opening act	Notes
Leg 1 – North America
3 February 2018	Campeche	México	Teatro del pueblo	—	(Sold Out)
4 February 2018	Jalostotitlán	México	Plaza de Toros	—	(Sold Out)
10 February 2018	Playa del carmen	México	Plaza 28 de julio	—	(Sold Out)
Latin America
24 February 2018 (Note: Festival de Viña del Mar: "100 años" (with Prince Royce)	Viña del Mar	Chile	Quinta Vergara	—	(Sold Out)
North America
2 March 2018	Tapachula	México	Palenque	—	(Sold Out)
8 March 2018	Mérida	México	Coliseo Yucatán	—	–
14 March 2018	México City	México	Auditorio Nacional	Raquel Sofía	(Sold Out)
15 March 2018	México City	México	Auditorio Nacional	Raquel Sofía	(Sold Out)
Latin America
21 March 2018	Panama City	Panama	Convenciones Amador	—	(Sold Out)
23 March 2018	San Salvador	El salvador	Anfiteatro Cifco	—	(Sold Out)
24 March 2018	Guatemala City	Guatemala	Forum Majadas	—	(Sold Out)
25 March 2018	San José	Costa Rica	Parque Viva, La Guácima	—	(Sold Out)
North America
31 March 2018	Acapulco	México	Forum Mundo Imperial	—	–
3 April 2018	San Francisco	United States	The Fillmore	—	(Sold Out)
4 April 2018	Fresno	United States	Warnors Center	—	–
5 April 2018	Sacramento	United States	Ace of Spades	—	(Sold Out)
7 April 2018	Las Vegas	United States	House Of Blues	—	–
8 April 2018	Anaheim	United States	House Of Blues	—	–
10 April 2018	Riverside	United States	Riverside Municipal Auditorium	—	–
12 April 2018	Los Ángeles	United States	The Wiltern	—	–
14 April 2018	Tucson	United States	The Rialto Theatre	—	(Sold Out)
15 April 2018	Phoenix	United States	Comerica Theatre	—	(Sold Out)
19 April 2018	Aguascalientes	México	Plaza de Toros Aguascalientes	—	–
20 April 2018	Guadalajara	México	Auditorio Telmex	Raquel Sofía	(Sold Out)
21 April 2018	Morelia	México	Plaza de Toros Morelia	—	–
27 April 2018	Querétaro	México	Auditorio Josefa Ortiz	—	–
28 April 2018	Puebla	México	Acrópolis Puebla	—	–
3 May 2018	Dallas	United States	Majestic Theatre	—	(Sold Out)
4 May 2018	Mcallen	United States	State Farm Hidalgo Arena	—	(Sold Out)
5 May 2018	Laredo	United States	Energy Arena	—	–
10 May 2018	El Paso	United States	The Plaza Theatre	—	–
11 May 2018	Houston	United States	Revention Music Center	—	–
12 May 2018	San antonio	United States	The Aztec Theatre	—	(Sold Out)
15 May 2018	Hermosillo	México	Palenque Expogan	—	–
17 May 2018	San Luis Potosí	México	El Domo	—	–
18 May 2018	Monterrey	México	Auditorio Citibanamex	—	(Sold Out)
19 May 2018	Monterrey	México	Auditorio Citibanamex	—	(Sold Out)
23 May 2018	México City	México	Auditorio Nacional	—	(Sold Out)
Latin America
26 May 2018	Rosario	Argentina	Teatro Broadway	—	(Sold Out)
27 May 2018	Córdoba	Argentina	Quality Espacio	—	(Sold Out)
29 May 2018	Tucumán	Argentina	Teatro Municipal Tucumán	—	(Sold Out)
30 May 2018	Salta	Argentina	Teatro Provincial de Salta	—	(Sold Out)
1 June 2018	Montevideo	Uruguay	Palacio Peñarol	Forer	(Sold Out)
2 June 2018	Buenos Aires	Argentina	Luna Park	—	(Sold Out)
3 June 2018	Santiago	Chile	Movistar Arena	—	(Sold Out)
8 June 2018	Quito	Ecuador	Ágora de la Casa	—	(Sold Out)
9 June 2018	Guayaquil	Ecuador	Coliseo Voltaire Paladines Polo	—	–
12 June 2018	Lima	Peru	Anfiteatro del parque de la Exposición	—	–
13 June 2018	Lima	Peru	Anfiteatro del parque de la Exposición	—	(Sold Out)
14 June 2018	Bogotá	Colombia	Royal Center	—	–
16 June 2018	Medellin	Colombia	Teatro Metropolitano	—	–
North America
23 June 2018	Toluca	México	Teatro Morelos	—	(Sold Out)
29 June 2018	Cancún	México	Plaza de Toros	—	(Sold Out)
6 July 2018	Mexicali	México	Plaza de Toros Calafia	—	–
7 July 2018	Tijuana	México	El Trompo	—	(Sold Out)
11 July 2018 (Note: Concierto los 40 básico)	Mexico City	México	Foro Cultural Chapultepec	—	(Sold Out)
29 July 2018 (Note: Futbolito Bimbo)	Mexico City	México	Estadio Azteca	—	—
4 August 2018	Mazatlán	México	Mazatlán International Center	—	(Sold Out)
Latin America
7 August 2018 (Note: Festival 33 años.)	Shushufindi	Ecuador	Explanada Unidad Nacional	—	(Sold Out)
11 August 2018 (Note: Festival Radio Vibra)	Bogotá	Colombia	Campo de Golf Briceño	—	—
North America
21 August 2018 (Note: KCA México (100 años with Prince Royce))	Mexico City	México	Auditorio Nacional	—	(Sold Out)
23 August 2018 (Note: Festival de las estrellas)	San Juan	Puerto Rico	Coliseo Puerto Rico	—	(Sold Out)
31 August 2018 (Note: Acoustic Sessions.)	San Diego	United States	The Music Box	—	—
Europe
8 September 2018 (Note: Festival Cadena Dial)	Madrid	Spain	Wizink Center	—	(Sold Out)
North America
15 September 2018 (Note: Festival Independencia de México en Colima.)	Colima	México	Jardín Libertad de la capital	—	—
Europe
20 September 2018	Madrid	Spain	La Riviera	—	(Sold Out)
21 September 2018	Barcelona	Spain	Sala Razzmatazz 1	—	(Sold Out)
22 September 2018	Valencia	Spain	Sala Moon	—	(Sold Out)
23 September 2018	Seville	Spain	Sala Custom	—	(Sold Out)
Leg 2 – North America
6 October 2018	Villahermosa	México	Palenque del Parque Tabasco	—	–
10 October 2018	Chicago	United States	Joes Live	—	(Sold Out)
13 October 2018	New York	United States	Irving Plaza	—	(Sold Out)
15 October 2018	Atlanta	United States	The Buckhead	—	(Sold Out)
18 October 2018	Orlando	United States	House of Blues	—	(Sold Out)
21 October 2018	Miami	United States	The Filmore	—	–
23 October 2018	Guadalajara	México	Auditorio Benito Juárez	Bridget González	(Sold Out)
América Central
27 October 2018	Santo Domingo	Dominican Republic	Palacio de los Deportes	Techy Fatule	–
North America
3 November 2018 (Note: Feria Tamaulipas.)	Ciudad Victoria	México	Teatro del Pueblo	—	(Sold Out)
7 November 2018 (Note: Feria de Todos los Santos 2018.)	Tlaxcala	México	Tlaxcala Feria 2018	—	(Sold Out)
8 November 2018 (Note: Telehit 25 años)	Mexico City	México	Estadio Azteca	—	(Sold Out)
11 November 2018	Mexico City	México	Auditorio Nacional	Félix y Gil	(Sold Out)
19 November 2018	Culiacán	México	Palenque de Culiacán	Carolina Ross	(Sold Out)
23 November 2018	Monterrey	México	Auditorio Citibanamex	—	(Sold Out)
24 November 2018 (Note: Feria Xmatkuil 2018.)	Xmatkuil	México	Centro de espectáculos	—	(Sold Out)
30 November 2018 (Note: Fiestas de Noviembre 2018, Puerto Escondido)	Puerto Escondido	México	Playa Zicatela	—	—
6 December 2018 (Note: Experiencias Joya)	Mexico City	México	Arena Ciudad de México	—	(Sold Out)
7 December 2018	Torreón	México	Coliseo Centenario de Torreón	—	(Sold Out)
8 December 2018	Saltillo	México	Auditorio Parque las maravillas	—	–
12 December 2018	Tuxtla Gutierrez	México	Palenque de Gallos	—	–
14 December 2018	Tepic	México	Auditorio Amado Nervo	Arcano	–
22 January 2019	León	México	Palenque de la Feria de León	—	(Sold Out)
1 February 2019	Mexico City	México	Auditorio Nacional	Coastcity	(Sold Out)
2 February 2019	Mexico City	México	Auditorio Nacional	Coastcity	(Sold Out)
Latin America
12 February 2019 (Note: Festival Villa María, Cordoba.: "Te dejo en libertad" (with Soledad Pastorutti))	Córdoba	Argentina	Anfiteatro Centenario de Villa María	—	(Sold Out)
14 February 2019 (Note: Lima Music Fest 2019)	Lima	Peru	Jockey Club	—	(Sold Out)
15 February 2019	Rancagua	Chile	Gran Arena Monticello	—	(Sold Out)
North America
22 February 2019	Tampico	México	Centro de convenciones	—	(Sold Out)
16 March 2019	CD Júarez	México	Estadio Canales Lira	—	–
24 March 2019	San Juan	Puerto Rico	Coliseo Puerto Rico	—	–
28 March 2019 (Note: Evento #StefanoMx)	Mexico City	México	Music Box	—	—
4 April 2019	Guadalajara	México	Auditorio Telmex	Chucho Rivas	(Sold Out)
5 April 2019	Monterrey	México	Auditorio Citibanamex	Chucho Rivas	(Sold Out)
7 April 2019	Texcoco	México	Teatro del pueblo	—	–
12 April 2019	Puebla	México	Palenque de la Feria de Puebla	—	(Sold Out)
30 May 2019	Monterrey	México	Domo Care	—	(Sold Out)
24 July 2019	Durango City	México	Palenque Expoferia Gómez Palacio	—	(Sold Out)
Latin America
24 August 2019 (Note: Shot with Jesse and Joy)	Guayaquil	Ecuador	Coliseo Voltaire Paladines Polo	Sergio Vivar	(Sold Out)
North America
22 September 2019	Tijuana	México	Audiorama del Museo Interactivo	—	(Sold Out)
8 December 2019 (Note: "Coca-Cola METATE Festival")	Mexico City	México	Parque Bicentenario	—	—
12 December 2019	Querétaro	México	Palenque Querétaro	—	–
16 January 2020	León	México	Palenque León	—	–
14 February 2020 (Note: "Zocalo Día del Amor Festival")	Mexico City	México	Zócalo	—	—
28 May 2021	Monterrey	México	Palco Tecate	—	(Sold Out)
29 May 2021	Monterrey	México	Palco Tecate	—	(Sold Out)
2 July 2021	México City	México	Curva 4 – Autódromo	—	(Sold Out)
3 July 2021	México City	México	Curva 4 – Autódromo	—	(Sold Out)
16 July 2021	Torreón	México	Coliseo Centenario	—	(Sold Out)
23 October 2021	Tijuana	México	Audiorama El Trompo	—	(Sold Out)
Surth America
22 January 2022 (Note: Festival de Las Condes: "Te Dejo en Libertad" (with Francisca Valenzuela)	Santiago	Chile	Parque Padre Hurtado	—	(Sold Out)
North America
26 January 2022	León	México	Palenque León	—	(Sold Out)
2 April 2022	Tampico	México	Centro de convenciones	—	(Sold Out)
23 April 2022	Tequesquitengo	México	Jardines de México	—	(Sold Out)
28 April 2022	Monterrey	México	Domo Care	—	(Sold Out)
8 May 2022	Puebla	México	Foro Artístico	—	—
14 may 2022	Toluca	México	Teatro Morelos	—	(Sold Out)
23 July 2022	Acapulco	México	Arena GNP	—	(Sold Out)
19 August 2022	Monclova	México	Feria Monclova Coahuila	—	(Sold Out)
1 September 2022	Oaxaca	México	Auditorio Guelaguetza	—	
