= Ednovi (magician) =

Mexican magician and mentalist

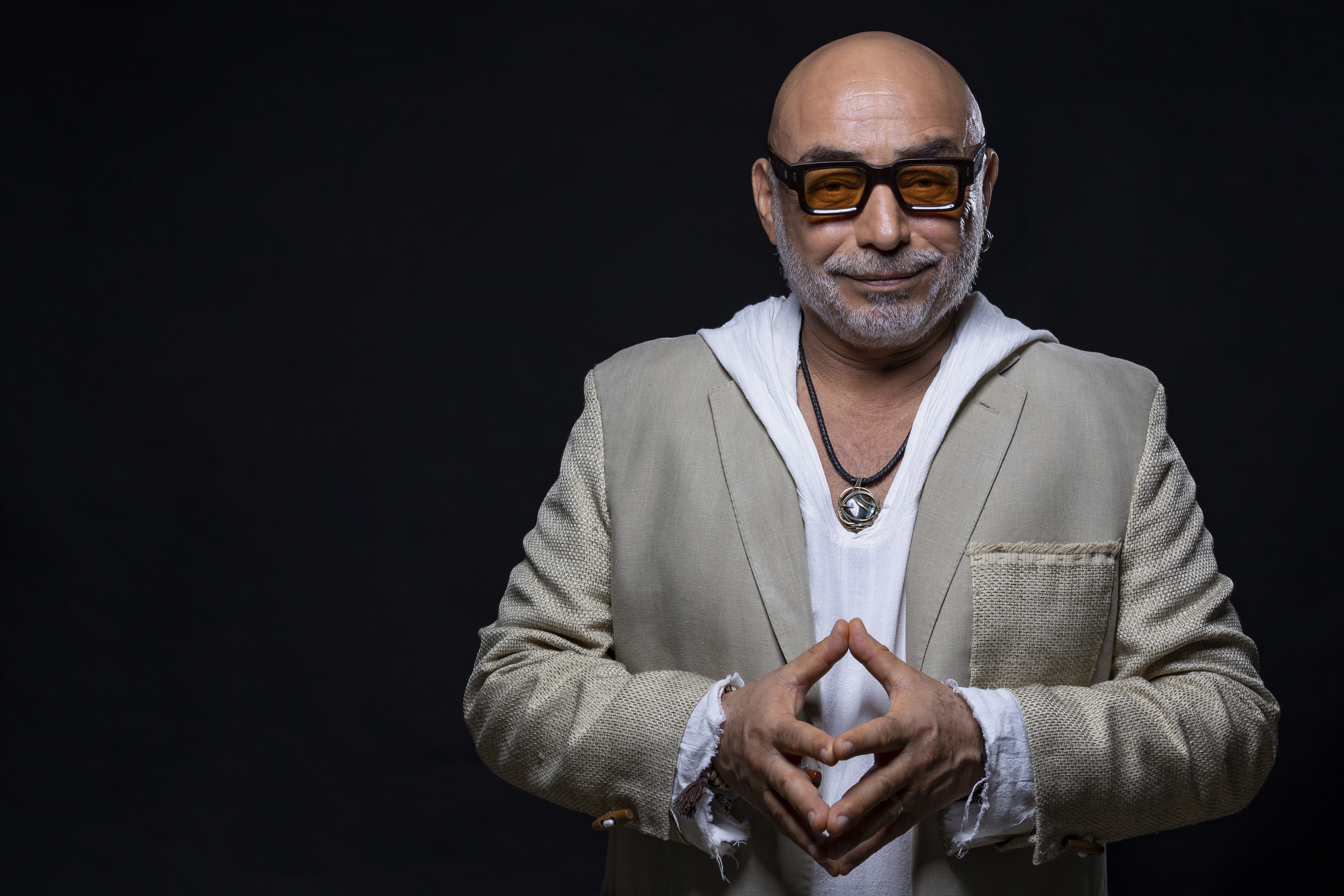
- Born: Edmundo Javier Novelo Villegas; 20 May 1961 (age 65)
- Occupations: Magician and mentalist
- Years active: 1980s–present

Edmundo Javier Novelo Villegas (born 20 May 1961), commonly referred to his stage name Ednovi, is a Mexican magician and mentalist. He has performed in theater productions, television programs, and corporate events in Mexico and internationally.

He has been associated with stage magic productions and live entertainment events in Mexico, including appearances at cultural festivals and televised programs.

== Early life and career ==
Ednovi was born on 20 May 1961. In 1989, he produced and performed in Abracadabra, The Mystery of the Mirrors, a theatrical magic production staged at the Julio Prieto Theater in Mexico City.

He has performed in festivals and cultural venues in Mexico, including the Festival del Centro Histórico in Mexico City and events at the National Auditorium. Ednovi has participated in international magic events, including performances in gala in FLASOMA in 1992 in Bogota, Colombia.

From 2000 to 2004, he appeared on the TV Azteca program Tempranito, presenting recurring magic segments. In 2010, he participated in Televisa programming related to the 2010 FIFA World Cup, presenting predictive-style performances connected to football matches for the Mexico national football team. In 2016, he presented the stage production The Show of the Impossible, which toured in Mexico.

Ednovi has also worked in event production and creative consultancy related to live entertainment and special effects.
