= Ha*Ash: En Vivo =

2019 live/video album by Ha*Ash

Live album and video by Ha*Ash
- Released: 6 December 2019
- Recorded: 11 November 2018
- Venue: Auditorio Nacional (Mexico City, Mexico)
- Genre: Country pop; latin pop; power ballad
- Length: 86:26 (CD)
- Language: Spanish
- Label: Sony Music Latin; OCESA Seitrack
- Director: Gonzalo Ferrari
- Producer: Roberto Contreras

Ha*Ash chronology
30 de Febrero (2017)	Ha*Ash: En Vivo (2019)	Haashtag (2022)

Ha*Ash live albums chronology
Primera Fila: Hecho Realidad (2014)	Ha*Ash: En Vivo (2019)

Singles from Ha*Ash: En Vivo
- 1. "Si tú no vuelves" Released: December 6, 2019

Ha*Ash: En Vivo (transl. "Live") is the first live concert DVD and second live album by American Latin pop duo Ha*Ash. It was released through Sony Music Latin and OCESA Seitrack on December 6, 2019, as a digital download. It was filmed at the Auditorio Nacional in Mexico City, on November 11, 2018, during their world tour Gira 100 años contigo. It features guest appearances from American singer Prince Royce on "100 Años", musician Miguel Bosé on "Si Tu No Vuelves" and Spanish singer Melendi on "Destino o Casualidad".

== Background and development ==
Concerts serve as the perfect bridge that connects our fans’ emotions to our own. Since memories fade with time, we decided to embark on this project, so we can relive these moments with you forever.

—Ha*Ash on releasing "En Vivo".

To support 30 de Febrero (2017), Ha*Ash embarked on a worldwide concert Gira 100 años contigo. The tour was announced by Ha*Ash on their social media in November 2017. On January 13, 2018, the concert tour was confirmed and it began on February 24, 2018. The tour continued in the Auditorio Nacional of Mexico City with 3 shows.

The setlist includes songs of the new album but also older singles from Ha*Ash (2003), Mundos Opuestos (2005), Habitación Doble (2008), A Tiempo (2011) and Primera Fila: Hecho Realidad (2014). The tour included South America, North America and Europe. The show in Auditorio Nacional, Mexico City on November 11, 2018, was filmed and was released as a CD/DVD.

== Release and promotion ==
The intention to release a live DVD from the tour Gira 100 años contigo was first announced in the TV Program Cuéntamelo ya! on September 6, 2018, in which the band's singer, Hanna Nicole, reported that the concert in Mexico, was being filmed for a DVD release. The release date, title and artwork were disclosed on November 26, 2019. The album preorders beginning on November 28, 2019, in Apple Music and Spotify. On November 29, 2019, there was a sweepstakes to win tickets to an exclusive screening of the film. It was released worldwide as a digital download on December 6, 2019. In Mexico, the standard edition of the album was released exclusively at Mixup Music Store on December 6, 2019. In Spain the album it was made released on January 3, 2020.

=== Singles ===
"Si tú no vuelves" with Miguel Bosé was released as the lead single in December and peaked at number 1 on the Monitor Latino in Mexico.

== Commercial performance ==
The album, in its opening week, debuted at number one on the AMPROFON chart in Mexico.

== Concert synopsis ==
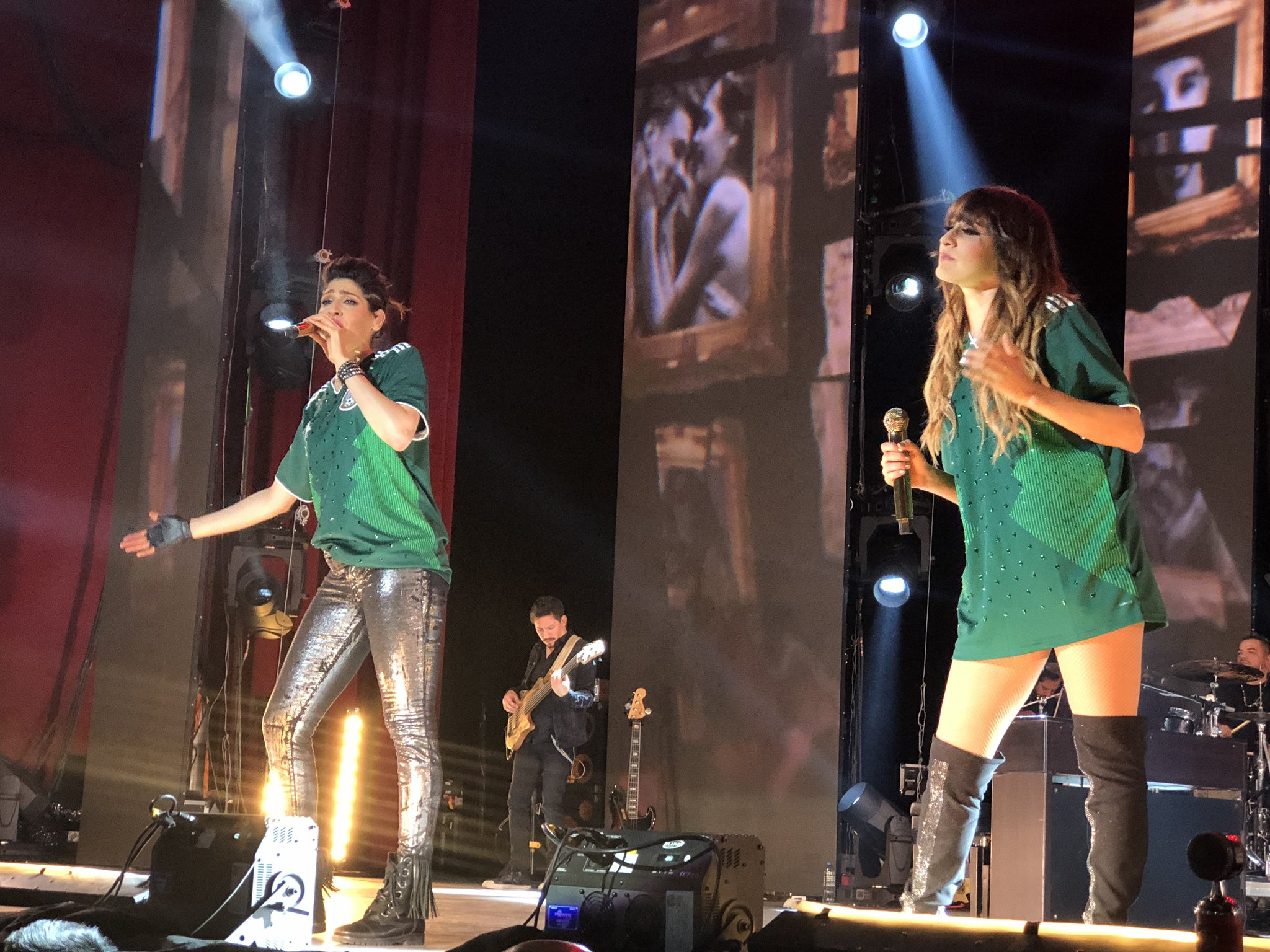
Ha*Ash performs in Auditorio Nacional, Mexico on the Gira 100 años contigo on November 11, 2018.

The show opened with Felix y Gil performing two of their songs. As they finished their performance, the backdrops started displaying Ha*Ash's images from her music videos. The band came into focus, and the music started. They appeared from the back of the theater performing "Estés Donde Estés" and "¿De Dónde Sacas Eso?". They greeted the audience and made their way towards the stage as they continued to perform. On stage, Ha*Ash sang "Amor a Medias". Next, they performed "Ojalá" and interacted with the audience. "Todo No Fue Suficiente", "¿Qué Me Faltó?" and "Sé Que Te Vas" are performed afterwards as part of the medley. Later on, Ha*Ash performed "Destino o Casualidad" with singer-songwriter Melendi.

Afterwards, Ha*Ash sang the Primera Fila: Hecho Realidad album track "Dos Copas de Más" and the third single from 30 de Febrero, "Eso No Va a Suceder". They finished the performance and disappeared behind the wings for a costume change. During the intermediate bridge, her band played instrumental versions of the songs "¿Qué Hare Con Este Amor?" and "Esta Mujer". The next segment started with the third single from Mundos Opuestos, "¿Qué Hago Yo?" The performance was followed by the song "Me Entrego a Ti", "No Pasa Nada" and "Te Dejo en Libertad". Ha*Ash continues with a performance of "Si tú no vuelves" with Panamanian-born Spanish Miguel Bosé.

As the show drew to a close, Ha*Ash performed "Ex de Verdad" and Odio Amarte". Later on, American artist Prince Royce joined Ha*Ash on stage for a live rendition of 100 Años". The second act concluded with Ha*Ash performing "Lo Aprendí de Ti" and "No Te Quiero Nada" and they disappeared behind the wings for a costume change. They appeared onstage with Mexican soccer jerseys, to perform "Perdón, Perdón" and "30 de Febrero"which is accompanied by a sing-along with the audience and confetti and white balloons falling from above. They then exited the stage after thanking the audience for their presence.

== Track listing ==
En Vivo – Standard edition (disc one)
No.	Title	Writer(s)	Original Album	Length
1.	"Estés Donde Estés"	Áureo Baqueiro; Salvador Rizo	2003 ~ Ha*Ash	3:15
2.	"¿De Dónde Sacas Eso?"	Ashley Grace; Hanna Nicole; José Luis Ortega	2011 ~ A Tiempo	3:24
3.	"Amor a Medias"	Baqueiro; Rizo	2005 ~ Mundos Opuestos	4:13
4.	"Ojalá"	Ashley; Hanna; Pablo Preciado	2017 ~ 30 de Febrero	3:46
5.	"Sé Que Te Vas"	Ashley; Hanna; Preciado	2014 ~ Primera Fila: Hecho Realidad	3:59
6.	"Todo No Fue Suficiente"	Ashley; Hanna; Yoel Henríquez	2011 ~ A Tiempo	2:34
7.	"¿Qué Me Faltó?"	Ashley; Hanna; Ortega	2017 ~ 30 de Febrero	3:24
8.	"Destino o Casualidad" (feat. Melendi)	Melendi	2017 ~ Quítate las gafas	4:26
9.	"Dos Copas de Más"	Ashley; Hanna; Preciado	2014 ~ Primera Fila: Hecho Realidad	3:34
10.	"Eso No Va a Suceder"	Ashley; Hanna; Edgar Barrera	2017 ~ 30 de Febrero	4:10
11.	"¿Qué Hago Yo?"	Soraya	2005 ~ Mundos Opuestos	3:44
Total length:				40:27

En Vivo – Standard edition (disc two)
No.	Title	Writer(s)	Original Album	Length
12.	"Me Entrego a Ti"	Soraya	2005 ~ Mundos Opuestos	4:17
13.	"No Pasa Nada"	Ashley; Hanna; Ortega	2017 ~ 30 de Febrero	3:21
14.	"Te Dejo en Libertad"	Ashley; Hanna; Ortega	2011 ~ A Tiempo	4:51
15.	"Si tú no vuelves" (feat. Miguel Bosé)	Miguel Bosé; Massimo Grilli	1993 ~ Bajo el signo de Caín	5:30
16.	"Ex de Verdad"	Ashley; Hanna; Beatriz Luengo; Antonio Rayo	2014 ~ Primera Fila: Hecho Realidad	3:51
17.	"Odio Amarte"	Ashley; Hanna; Baqueiro	2003 ~ Ha*Ash	3:29
18.	"100 años" (feat. Prince Royce)	Ashley; Hanna; Geoffrey Rojas; Andy Clay; Erika Ender	2017 ~ 30 de Febrero	3:14
19.	"Lo Aprendí de Ti"	Ashley; Hanna; Ortega	2014 ~ Primera Fila: Hecho Realidad	3:27
20.	"No Te Quiero Nada"	Baqueiro	2008 ~ Habitación Doble	4:48
21.	"Perdón, Perdón"	Ashley; Hanna; Ortega	2014 ~ Primera Fila: Hecho Realidad	3:39
22.	"30 de Febrero"	Ashley; Hanna; Abraham Mateo; Santiago Hernández; Rafael Vergara	2017 ~ 30 de Febrero	5:38
Total length:				45:59

En Vivo – Standard edition (disc three) DVD
No.	Title	Length
1.	"Estés Donde Estés" (live video)	3:19
2.	"¿De Dónde Sacas Eso?" (live video)	3:24
3.	"Amor a Medias" (live video)	4:17
4.	"Ojalá" (live video)	3:46
5.	"Sé Que Te Vas" (live video)	4:01
6.	"Todo No Fue Suficiente" (live video)	2:37
7.	"¿Qué me faltó?" (live video)	3:23
8.	"Destino o Casualidad" (feat. Melendi, live video)	4:23
9.	"Dos Copas de Más" (live video)	3:33
10.	"Eso No Va a Suceder" (live video)	4:12
11.	"¿Qué Hago Yo?" (live video)	3:44
12.	"Me Entrego a Ti" (live video)	4:15
13.	"No Pasa Nada" (live video)	3:22
14.	"Te Dejo en Libertad" (live video)	4:20
15.	"Si Tú No Vuelves" (feat. Miguel Bosé, live video)	5:31
16.	"Ex de Verdad" (live video)	3:53
17.	"Odio Amarte" (live video)	3:34
18.	"100 Años" (feat. Prince Royce, live video)	3:12
19.	"Lo Aprendí de Ti" (live video)	3:29
20.	"No Te Quiero Nada" (live video)	4:44
21.	"Perdón, Perdón" (live video)	3:45
22.	"30 de Febrero" (live video)	4:32

=== Formats ===
- CD and DVD – Digipak case edition containing three discs: DVD of the concert and two CD containing 22 live tracks.
- Digital download and streaming;– contains the 22 tracks from the CD release.

== Credits and personnel ==
Credits adapted from the liner notes of the Mexican edition of En Vivo.

=== Musicians ===
- Ashley Grace – lead vocals (1–22), guitar (1, 12)
- Hanna Nicole – lead vocals (1–22), guitar (1–2, 4, 16, 20), electric guitar (3), harmonica (12), keyboards (13, 19)
- Miguel Bosé – lead vocals (15)
- Melendi – lead vocals (8)
- Prince Royce – lead vocals (18)
- Mateo Aguilar Uscanga: keyboards (1–22)
- Gerardo "Tito" Ruelas: guitar (1–22)
- Fernando Ruiz: bass (1–22)
- Ricardo Cortéz: drums (1–22)
- Rodrigo "Oso" Duarte: multi-instrumentalist (1–22), cello (1–22)
- Omar Álvarez Martínez: violin (11)
- Margie Espinales Correa: violin (11)
- Arnoldo Cabrera: violin (11)
- Andrea Alvarado Troncoso: viola (11)

=== Production ===
- Roberto Contreras: production manager
- Alain Coorthout: concert design
- Stephanie Rudamn: tour manager
- Bernardo García Salgado: community manager
- Oscar Tobar: monitor engineer (Ha*Ash)
- Luis Román: monitor engineer (Ha*Ash), room engineer
- Goofy: lighting engineer
- Luis López: stage manager
- Fernando Aponte: stage
- Carlos García stage
- Celso Moreno: backline
- Miguel Tapia: room engineer (Miguel Bosé)
- Ángel Magro: monitor engineer (Miguel Bosé)
- Javier López: recording engineer (Miguel Bosé)

=== Administration and video credits ===
- Gonzalo Ferrari: direction
- Miguel Tafich: realization
- Alberto Montiel: realization
- Carolina González: realization
- Héctor González: assistant director
- Karen Campos: realization assistant
- Sofía López: realization assistant
- Patricio Tamés: realization assistant
- Jordy Alcérreca: Manager Ocesa Seitrack
- Octavio Padilla: show Crew Ha*Ash
- Alex Mizrahi: show Crew Ha*Ash
- Javier Montemayor: show Crew Ha*Ash
- Enrique García: show Crew Ha*Ash
- Gerard Angulo: changing rooms
- Óscar Trapero: security

=== Design ===
- Chino Lemus: album Artwork photographer
- Quique Ollervides: graphic and logo design
- Guillermo Gutiérrez: A&R
- Charlie García: A&R

== Charts ==
Chart (2019)	Peak position
México Top 20 (AMPROFON)	1
México Top 100 (AMPROFON)	5

== Release history ==
Region	Date	Edition(s)	Format	Label	Ref.
Various	December 6, 2019	Standard Edition	Digital download; streaming	Sony Music Latin	
Mexico	December 6, 2019	Standard Edition	2 CD / DVD	Sony Music México, OCESA Seitrack	
Spain	January 3, 2020	Standard Edition	2 CD / DVD	Sony Music España	
