= 30 de Febrero =

2017 studio album by Ha*Ash

Studio album by Ha*Ash
- Released: 1 December 2017
- Recorded: Mid 2017
- Studio: Cutting Cane Studios (Florida); Heiga Studios & Hit23 (Miami); Swing House ATX (Los Ángeles)
- Genre: Latin pop; power ballad
- Length: 40:35
- Language: Spanish
- Label: Sony Music Latin
- Producer: Hanna Nicole (co.); George Noriega; Matt Rad; Joe London; Edge

Ha*Ash chronology
Primera Fila: Hecho Realidad (2014)	30 de Febrero (2017)	Ha*Ash: En Vivo (2019)

Ha*Ash studio album chronology
A Tiempo (2011)	30 de Febrero (2017)	Haashtag (2022)

Singles from 30 de Febrero
- 1. "100 Años" Released: 13 October 2017; 2. "No Pasa Nada" Released: 8 March 2018; 3. "Eso No Va a Suceder" Released: 8 August 2018; 4. "¿Qué Me Faltó?" Released: 4 January 2019

30 de Febrero (transl. "February 30") is the fifth studio album by American Latin pop duo Ha*Ash, released on 1 December 2017 Sony Music Latin. It is the band's first studio album in six years, after their previous album, A Tiempo (2011). The album features artists Prince Royce and Abraham Mateo. Ha*Ash assumed an integral role in the album's production and collaborated with several producers including George Noriega, Matt Rad, Joe London and Edgar Barrera.

The album was preceded by the release of four singles. The first, "100 Años" featuring Prince Royce was released 13 October 2017. In November 2017, The second single, "No Pasa Nada", was released on 8 March 2018. The other singles released were, "Eso No Va a Suceder" and "¿Qué Me Faltó?". Ha*Ash released six lyric; "Ojalá", "30 de Febrero" and "Eso No Va a Suceder". The 4th, 5th and 6th lyric videos came out on 1 December, which were "Paleta", "No Pasa Nada", and "Llueve Sobre Mojado", which were all released on the same day as the album.

To promote the album, the band embarked on Gira 100 años contigo, which began at the Quinta Vergara Amphitheater in Viña del Mar, Chile on 24 February 2018. Footage from the concert at the Auditorio Nacional in Mexico was recorded and released on a CD/DVD, entitled Ha*Ash: En Vivo, in 2019.

== Background and production ==
The follow-up to Primera Fila: Hecho Realidad, the album introduces new genres to the duo. On 13 January 2018 it was confirmed that Ha*Ash will be holding concerts for their new recent album. They will perform once again at the Auditorio Josefa Ortiz de Dominguez on 27 April 2018. They will set to tour in March 2018 for their tour as well. The lead single "100 Años" with Prince Royce; marks the first time the duo delves into the genre of reggaeton and urban music. Ha*Ash assumed an integral role in the album's production and collaborated with several producers including George Noriega, Matt Rad, Joe London and Edgar Barrera. The album, like Ha*Ash' previous records, contains many different genres of music, including rhythms closer urban beats.

== Release and promotion ==
It is the band's first studio album in six years, after of their previous album, A Tiempo (2011), and it was recorded in 2017 in Miami, United States. In the United States and Mexico, the standard edition CD of the album was released on 1 December 2017, under the Sony Music Latin label. The CD/DVD edition was released the same day.

=== Singles ===
The first single from the album was "100 Años" with Prince Royce; released on 13 October 2017, The track peaked at number 50 in the Latin Pop Songs, and number 24 in the Latin Airplay charts in the United States. In Mexico, the song peaked at number one on the Mexico Espanol Airplay, and Monitor Latino. "100 Años" was certified platinum and gold in Mexico and gold in the United States. The second single "No Pasa Nada" was released on 8 March 2018, peaked at number 13 in the Mexico Airplay, number 4 in the Mexico Espanol Airplay and number two on the Monitor Latino charts in Mexico. On 1 February 2019, it was announced that No Pasa Nada had been certified Platinum.

On 8 August 2018, they released the third single from the album, "Eso No Va a Suceder". The song peaked at number 34 in the Latin Pop Songs charts in the United States and number one of the Mexican Espanol Airplay and Monitor Latino in Mexico. In September 2019 the song was certified Platinum in Mexico. The video for this single was released on 8 August 2018. On 4 January 2019, the track "¿Qué Me Faltó?" was released as the album's fourth single and was accompanied by a music video. The clip was recorded in the beach in Oaxaca, Mexico. It was under the direction by Toño Tzinzun. The track peaked two on the Monitor Latino in Mexico.

=== Other songs ===
Then as for the month of November Ha*Ash released "Ojalá" lyric video. It was directed by Diego Álvarez. The song takes place in an office setting and has the vibe of a pop song, that shows many texts between the girls and the guy who is an ex lover of Ashley. On 1 February 2019 the song was certified gold in Mexico. Same month of November they released the song "30 de Febrero" which featured Abraham Mateo in the lyric video. The song is a break up song and has a colorful vibe with having Abraham their ex lover who is wanting another chance. The song is a classy and upbeat. On 1 February 2019 the song was certified gold in Mexico. On 1 December, Ha*Ash were released lyric videos of "Paleta" and "Llueve Sobre Mojado". Both songs, is musically complete with pop beats and a reggaeton sound.

=== Tour ===
To promote the album, Ha*Ash embarked on a world concert tour during 2018 and 2020. The "Gira 100 años contigo" is a concert tour performed by Ha*Ash. The tour was announced by Ha*Ash on her social media in November 2017. The tour will begin in the National Auditorium of Mexico City with 3 shows. At some shows, Ha*Ash covered songs such as "Adios Amor" by Christian Nodal. The setlist includes songs of the new album but also older singles from Ha*Ash, Mundos Opuestos, Habitación Doble, A Tiempo and Primera fila: Hecho Realidad.

The show filmed at the Auditorio Nacional in Mexico City, Mexico on 11 November 2018, entitled Ha*Ash: En Vivo, was released for sales on 6 December 2019.

== Commercial performance ==
The album peaked at #3 in the Mexican album charts, #11 in the US Billboard Latin Pop Albums and #11 in the US Billboard Latin pop sales. On 14 February 2018 the album was certified gold in Mexico. On 11 November 2018 the album eventually was certified Platinum in Mexico.

== Track listing ==
Standard edition
No.	Title	Writer(s)	Producer(s)	Length
1.	"30 de Febrero" (featuring Abraham Mateo)	Ashley Grace; Hanna Nicole; Abraham Mateo; Santiago Hernández; Rafael Vergara	Hanna Nicole^{[a]}; George Noriega	3:17
2.	"Ojalá"	Ashley; Hanna; Pablo Preciado	Hanna^{[a]}; Noriega	3:27
3.	"No Pasa Nada"	Ashley; Hanna; José Luis Ortega	Hanna^{[a]}; Noriega	3:14
4.	"Eso No Va a Suceder"	Ashley; Hanna; Edgar Barrera	Hanna^{[a]}; Edge; Joe London	3:40
5.	"100 Años" (with Prince Royce)	Ashley; Hanna; Geoffrey Rojas; Andy Clay; Erika Ender	Hanna^{[a]}; Matt Rad	3:05
6.	"Llueve Sobre Mojado"	Ashley; Hanna; Barrera	Hanna^{[a]}; Edge; London	3:28
7.	"Paleta"	Ashley; Hanna; Camilo Echeverry; Mau Montaner	Hanna^{[a]}; Noriega	3:29
8.	"Extraños"	Ashley; Hanna; Yoel Henríquez	Hanna^{[a]}; Barrera; London	3:31
9.	"¿Qué Me Faltó?"	Ashley; Hanna; Ortega	Hanna^{[a]}; Noriega	3:22
10.	"No Me Importa"	Ashley; Hanna; Barrera	Hanna^{[a]}; Noriega	3:52
11.	"Corazón Irrompible"	Ashley; Hanna; Henríquez	Hanna^{[a]}; Noriega, Pete Wallace	3:10
12.	"Me Gustas Tú"	Ashley; Hanna; Andy Clay; Raquel Sofía	Hanna^{[a]}; Rad	2:54
Total length:				40:35

Standard Edition - Bonus DVD
No.	Title	Length
1.	"No Pasa Nada" (Lyric Video)
2.	"30 de Febrero" (feat. Abraham Mateo, Lyric Video)
3.	"Ojalá" (Lyric Video)
4.	"Llueve Sobre Mojado" (Lyric Video)
5.	"Eso No Va a Suceder" (Lyric Video)
6.	"Paleta" (Lyric Video)
7.	"100 Años" (feat. Prince Royce, Official Video)

Notes

- ^{^[a]} signifies a co-producer

== Credits and personnel ==
Credits adapted from the album's liner notes.

=== Musicians ===
- Ashley Grace – vocals (all tracks)
- Hanna Nicole – vocals (all tracks)
- Abraham Mateo: vocals (1)
- Prince Royce: vocals (5)
- Matt Rad: background vocals (5, 12), keyboards (5, 12), guitar (5, 12)
- Santiago Hernández: keyboards (1)
- Rob Wells: keyboards (1)
- George Noriega: keyboards (1, 3, 7, 11), guitar (2–3, 7, 9–10), bass (2), brass (10)
- Matt Rad: drums (1–3, 7, 9, 11)
- Pete Wallace: keyboards (2–3, 9–11)
- Edgar Barrera: ukulele (4, 6, 8), keyboards (4, 6, 8), guitar (4, 6, 8), bass (4, 6, 8)
- Joe Spargur: ukulele (4, 6, 8), keyboards (4, 6, 8), guitar (4, 6, 8), bass (4, 6, 8), brass (8)
- Pablo De La Loza: keyboards (7), guitar (7), bass (7)
- Tim Mitchell: mandoline (11), guitar (11)

=== Production ===
- Hanna Nicole: executive director, executive producer (all tracks)
- George Noriega: producer (1–3, 7, 9–11), programmer (1–3, 7, 10–11), recording engineer (1–3, 7, 9–11), additional mixing assistant (5)
- Edge: producer (4, 6, 8), recording engineer (4, 6, 8), programmer (4, 6, 8)
- Joe London: producer (4, 6, 8), recording engineer (4, 6, 8), programmer (4, 6, 8)
- Matt Rad: producer (5, 12), programmer (5, 12), mixing (5, 12)
- Emily Lazar: mastering engineering (all tracks)
- Adrián Morales: assistant engineering (all tracks)
- Rafael Vergara: programmer (1)
- Santiago Hernández: programmer (1)
- Rob Wells: programmer (1), recording engineer (1–3)
- Diego Contento: recording engineer (1–3, 7, 9–11)
- Dave Clauss: mixing engineer (1–3, 9–11)
- Jean Rodríguez: vocal producer (all tracks), vocal engineer (all tracks), recording engineer (4, 6, 8)
- Pete Wallace: programmer (2–3, 9–11), recording engineer (9–11)
- Luis Barrera Jr: mixing (4, 6, 8)
- Francesco Grieco: assistant engineering (5, 12)
- Pablo De La Loza: programmer (7), recording engineer (7)
- Gustavo Celis: mixing (7)

=== Design ===
- Isabel de Jesús: A&R
- Charlie García: A&R
- Álex Gallardo: A&R
- Olga Laris: graphic and logo design

== Charts ==
=== Weekly charts ===
Weekly chart performance for 30 de Febrero
Chart (2017)	Peak position
Mexico (AMPROFON)	3
US (Billboard Latin)	11
US (Billboard Latin pop sales)	14

=== Year-end charts ===
2018 year-end chart performance for 30 de Febrero
Chart (2018)	Position
Mexican Albums (AMPROFON)	26

== Certifications ==
Region	Certification	Certified units/sales
Mexico (AMPROFON)	Platinum+Gold	90,000^{‡}
^{‡} Sales+streaming figures based on certification alone.

== Release history ==
Region	Date	Edition(s)	Format	Label
Various	1 December 2017	Standard	CD; Digital download	Sony Music Latin
Mexico	1 December 2017	Standard	CD/DVD; Digital download	Sony Music México
Various	1 December 2017	Standard	CD/DVD; Digital download	Sony Music Latin
