= 100 Años =

Single by Ha*Ash and Prince Royce

from the album 30 de Febrero
- Language: Spanish
- English title: "100 Years"
- Released: 13 October 2017
- Recorded: 2017 in Miami, United States
- Genre: Latin pop
- Length: 3:05
- Label: Sony Music Latin
- Songwriters: Ashley Grace Pérez; Hanna Nicole Pérez; Geoffrey Royce Rojas; Erika Ender; Andy Clay
- Producers: Matt Rad; Hanna Nicole (co.)

Ha*Ash singles chronology
"Destino o Casualidad" (2017)	"100 Años" (2017)	"No Pasa Nada" (2018)

Prince Royce singles chronology
"Ganas Locas" (2017)	"100 Años" (2017)	"Sensualidad" (2017)

Music video
- "100 Años" on YouTube

"100 Años" (transl. "100 Years") is a song written and recorded by American musical duo Ha*Ash and American singer Prince Royce. It was released on October 13, 2017 as the first of the single from their fifth studio album 30 de Febrero (2017). The song then included on their live album Ha*Ash: En Vivo (2019). It was written by Ashley Grace, Hanna Nicole, Geoffrey Rojas, Erika Ender and Andy Clay.

== Background and release ==
"100 Años" was written by Ashley Grace, Hanna Nicole, Geoffrey Rojas, Erika Ender and Andy Clay and produced by Hanna Nicole and Matt Rad. The band started working on the song during the 1F Hecho Realidad Tour. It was confirmed the single to be the first single from the album in September 2017 in Mexico. The song went to Latin radio stations in early October.

== Music video ==
A music video for "100 Años" was released on October 20, 2017. It was directed by Pablo Croce. The video was filmed in Hollywood Beach. As of October 2019, the video has over 120 million views on YouTube.

The second video for "100 Años", recorded live for the live album Ha*Ash: En Vivo, was released on December 6, 2019. The video was filmed in Auditorio Nacional, Mexico City.

== Commercial performance ==
The track peaked at number 50 in the Latin Pop Songs and at number 24 in the Latin Airplay charts in the United States. In Mexico, the song peaked at number one on the Mexican Singles Chart, and Monitor Latino. On February 14, 2018 the song was certified gold in México. On May 23, 2018 the song was certified Platinum in México. On June 23, 2018, it was announced that "100 Años" had been certified Doble Platinum in Perú. On November 11, 2018 "100 Años" was certified platinum+gold in México. In July 2019, the songs was certified as double platinum in Mexico.

== Live performances ==
Ha*Ash performed "100 años" for the first time at "The Voice Spain" in December 2017. On February 24, 2018, the duo appeared on Festival Viña del Mar, and also performed "100 Años". Also in August 2018, the duo appeared on the Mexican Kid Choice Awards and performed the single.

== Credits and personnel ==
Credits adapted from Genius.

Recording and management

- Recording Country: United States
- Sony / ATV Discos Music Publishing LLC / Westwood Publishing
- (P) 2017 Sony Music Entertainment México, S.A. De C.V.

Ha*Ash

- Ashley Grace – vocals, guitar, songwriting
- Hanna Nicole – vocals, guitar, piano, songwriting, production

Additional personnel

- Erika Ender – songwriting
- Andy Clay – songwriting, editor
- Prince Royce – vocals, songwriting
- Matt Rad – engineer, director, editor, keyboards, guitar
- George Noriega – editor
- Francesco Grieco – assistant engineer

== Charts ==
=== Weekly charts ===
Chart (2017–18)	Peak position
El Salvador (Monitor Latino)	3
Mexico (Monitor Latino)	1
Mexico (Billboard Mexican Airplay)	3
Mexico (Billboard Espanol Airplay)	1
Uruguay (Monitor Latino)	3
US Latin Airplay (Billboard)	50
US Latin Pop Airplay (Billboard)	24
US Latin Pop Digital Song Sales (Billboard)	15

=== Year-end charts ===
2017 year-end chart performance for "100 Años"
Chart (2017)	Position
Mexico (Monitor Latino)	57

2018 year-end chart performance for "100 Años"
Chart (2018)	Position
Argentina (Monitor Latino)	59
Bolivia (Monitor Latino)	84
Chile (Monitor Latino)	67
Costa Rica (Monitor Latino)	10
El Salvador (Monitor Latino)	22
Mexico (Monitor Latino)	35
Nicaragua (Monitor Latino)	46
Panama (Monitor Latino)	64
Peru (Monitor Latino)	26
Uruguay (Monitor Latino)	11

== Certifications ==
Region	Certification	Certified units/sales
Mexico (AMPROFON)	4× Platinum	240,000^{‡}
Perú (UNIMPRO)	2× Platinum	20,000^{^}
^{‡} Sales+streaming figures based on certification alone.

== Release history ==
Region	Date	Edition(s)	Format	Label	Ref.
Various	October 13, 2017	Standard	Digital download; streaming	Sony Music Latin	
Various	December 6, 2019	Live Version	Digital download; streaming	Sony Music Latin	
