= Telmex Auditorium =

Amphitheatre in Jalisco, Mexico

Coordinates: 20°43′59″N 103°22′52″W

Auditorio Telmex
- Interactive map of Auditorio Telmex
- Former names: Auditorio Metropolitano (2007)
- Address: Obreros de Cananea 747; Zapopan, Jalisco, Mexico 01 33 3834 9288
- Location: Guadalajara Metropolitan Area
- Owner: University of Guadalajara
- Capacity: 8,712
- Type: Indoor amphitheatre

Construction
- Groundbreaking: 22 July 2003
- Opened: 1 September 2007

Website
- Venue Website

Auditorio Telmex (English: Telmex Auditorium, originally Auditorio Metropolitano) is an indoor amphitheatre, located in Zapopan, Jalisco, Mexico.

Telmex, the largest communications company in Mexico, sponsored the auditorium and is one of the main centerpieces of the University Cultural Center, which is a large cultural project created by the University of Guadalajara.

The building was designed by Mexican architect José de Arimatea Moyao and it is located on Parres Arias Av., in Zapopan. Throughout its short history, it has hosted a number of events and concerts and it is considered the main show center in Western Mexico.

== History ==
On September 1, 2007 the auditorium was officially opened with a grand opening event hosted by Plácido Domingo.

During its construction, the University of Guadalajara was supported by the federal government of Mexico, the government of Jalisco, the Municipality of Zapopan, the Chamber of Deputies of Congress and the state Congress.

The auditorium is constructed to suit events both small and large as it is equipped with mechanically movable platforms and the sound stage can be adjusted in size by moving its movable walls. There are also 27 suites built in and an underground parking lot with direct access to the venue is available.
