= 30 de Febrero (song) =

Song by Ha*Ash featuring Abraham Mateo

from the album 30 de Febrero
- Released: 24 November 2017
- Recorded: 2017 in Miami, United States
- Genre: Latin pop; pop
- Length: 3:22
- Label: Sony Music Latin
- Songwriters: Ashley Grace Pérez; Hanna Nicole Pérez; Abraham Mateo; Santiago Hernández; Rafael Vergara
- Producers: Hanna Nicole; George Noriega

Lyrics video
- "30 de Febrero" on YouTube

"30 de Febrero" (transl. "February 30") is a song by American duo Ha*Ash for their fifth studio album of the same name (2017). A live version was included on their album Ha*Ash: En Vivo (2019). It was written by Ashley Grace, Hanna Nicole, Santiago Hernández and Rafael Vergara while the song was produced by Hanna Nicole and George Noriega and features guest vocals by Spanish singer Abraham Mateo.

== Background and composition ==
The track was released digitally on November 24, 2017, by Sony Music Entertainment México as a promotional tool for the album, which was released on seven days. The song is a break up song and has a colorful vibe with Abraham Mateo as their ex lover who is wanting another chance. The song is a classy and upbeat.

The band started working on the song during the 1F Hecho Realidad Tour. "30 de Febrero" was written by Ashley Grace, Hanna Nicole, Abraham Mateo, Santiago Hernández and Rafael Vergara, while the song was produced by Hanna and George Noriega. The song was recorded at Miami, United States in 2017. The official music video for the song hasn't been released.

== Commercial performance ==
On February 1, 2019, the song was certified gold in México.

== Music video ==
A lyric video for "30 de Febrero" featuring Abraham Mateo was released on November 24, 2017. It was directed by Diego Álvarez. As of October 2019, the video has over 101 million views on YouTube.

The music video for "Ojalá", recorded live for the live album Ha*Ash: En Vivo, was released on December 6, 2019. The video was filmed in Auditorio Nacional, Mexico City.

== Live performances ==
Ha*Ash included "30 de Febrero" on her "Gira 100 Años Contigo" (2018–2019) as the finish track.

== Credits and personnel ==
Credits adapted from Genius.

Recording and management

- Recording Country: United States
- Sony / ATV Discos Music Publishing LLC / Westwood Publishing
- (P) 2017 Sony Music Entertainment México, S.A. De C.V.

Ha*Ash

- Ashley Grace – vocals, guitar, songwriting
- Hanna Nicole – vocals, guitar, songwriting, production

Additional personnel

- Santiago Hernández – songwriting, editor, keyboards
- Abraham Mateo – songwriting
- Rafael Vergara – songwriting, editor
- Rob Welss – editor, keyboards
- George Noriega – engineer, editor, director, keyboards
- Pate Wallace – engineer
- Diego Contento – engineer
- Dave Clauss – engineer
- Matt Calderín – drums

== Certifications ==
Region	Certification	Certified units/sales
Mexico (AMPROFON)	Gold	30,000^{‡}
^{‡} Sales+streaming figures based on certification alone.

== Release history ==
Region	Date	Edition(s)	Format	Label	Ref.
Various	December 1, 2017	Standard	Digital download; streaming	Sony Music Latin	
Various	December 6, 2019	Live Version	Digital download; streaming	Sony Music Latin	
