= Fuiste Mía =

Single by MYA and Ha*Ash
- Language: Spanish
- Released: 25 February 2021
- Recorded: 2020
- Genre: power ballad
- Length: 3:44
- Label: Sony Music Argentina
- Songwriters: Maxi Espindola; Agustín Bernasconi; Esteban Noguera; Andy Clay
- Producer: Mapache Producciones

MYA singles chronology
"Te Quiero x Eso" (2021)	"Fuiste Mía" (2021)	"2:50 (Remix)" (2021)

Ha*Ash singles chronology
"Si Tú No Vuelves" (2019)	"Fuiste Mía" (2021)	"Lo Que un Hombre Debería Saber" (2022)

Music video
- "Fuiste Mía" on YouTube

"Fuiste Mía" is a song recorded by Argentine duo MYA and American duo Ha*Ash. It was released on February 25, 2021, through Sony Music Argentina, as single from MYA's upcoming second studio album. A music video was released alongside the song. The song is described as "power ballad".

== Background and release ==
"Fuiste Mía" was written by Maxi Espindola, Agustín Bernasconi, Esteban Noguera and Andy Clay and produced by Mapache Producciones. It was confirmed the single on February 22, 2021. "Fuiste Mía" was released for streaming to YouTube on 25 February 2021, and released for digital download a two days later under the same label.

== Music video ==
A Martin Seipel-directed music video for "Fuiste Mía" was released alongside the song on February 25, 2021. The video was filmed in isolation during the COVID-19 pandemic in early 2021 at the Houston, Texas by Ha*Ash and at Buenos Aires, Argentina by MYA.

== Credits and personnel ==
Credits adapted from Genius.

- Ashley Grace – lead vocals
- Hanna Nicole – lead vocals
- Maxi Espindola – lead vocals, songwriting, ingeniería de grabación
- Agustín Bernasconi – lead vocals, songwriting
- Esteban Noguera – songwriting
- Andy Clay – songwriting
- Mapache Producciones – production
- Juan Pablo Isaza Piñeros – programming, guitar, keyboards, record engineering
- Pablo Benito Revollo Bueno – programming, guitar, keyboards, record engineering
- Nicolás González Londoño – programming, guitar, keyboards, record engineering, organ B3
- Alan Ortega – record engineering
- Jean Rodríguez – record engineering, vocal engineering (Ha*Ash)
- Curt Schneider - mixing
- Dave Kutch - mastering
- Andrés Torres - drums

== Charts ==
Chart performance for "Fuiste Mía"
Chart (2021)	Peak position
Argentina (Argentina Hot 100)	74
Argentina (Monitor Latino)	15

== Release history ==
Release history and formats for "Fuiste Mía"
Region	Date	Format	Label	Ref.
Various	February 25, 2021	Streaming	Sony Music Argentina	
Various	February 27, 2021	Digital download	Sony Music Argentina	
