= Amor a Medias =

Single by Ha*Ash

from the album Mundos Opuestos
- Language: Spanish
- English title: "Half Love"
- Released: 8 June 2005
- Recorded: 2004–2005
- Genre: Latin pop; pop
- Length: 4:13
- Label: Sony Music Latin
- Songwriters: Áureo Baqueiro; Salvador Rizo
- Producer: Áureo Baqueiro

Ha*Ash singles chronology
"Si Pruebas una Vez" (2004)	"Amor a Medias" (2005)	"Me Entrego a Ti" (2005)

Music video
- "Amor a Medias" on YouTube

"Amor a Medias" (transl. "Half Love") is a Latin pop song recorded by American duo Ha*Ash. It was released on June 8, 2005 as the first of the single from their second studio album Mundos Opuestos (2005) and then included on their live album Ha*Ash: En Vivo (2019).

== Background and release ==
"Amor a Medias" was written by Áureo Baqueiro and Salvador Rizo and produced by Baqueiro. Is a song recorded by American duo Ha*Ash from her second studio album "Mundos Opuestos" (2005). It was released as the lead single from the album on June 8, 2005, by Sony Music Entertainment.

== Commercial performance ==
The track peaked at number 4 in the Monitor Latino charts in the Mexico.

== Music video ==
A music video for "Amor a Medias" was released in June, 2005. Was published on her YouTube channel on October 25, 2009. It was directed by Gustavo Garzón. As of October 2019, the video has over 38 million views on YouTube.

The second music video for "Amor a Medias" recorded live for his album A Tiempo edition deluxe (DVD) was released on 2012.

The third video for "Amor a Medias", recorded live for the live album Ha*Ash: En Vivo, was released on December 6, 2019. The video was filmed in Auditorio Nacional, Mexico City.

== Credits and personnel ==
Credits adapted from AllMusic and Genius.

Recording and management

- Recording Country: United States
- Sony / ATV Discos Music Publishing LLC / Westwood Publishing
- (P) 2005 Sony Music Entertainment México, S.A. De C.V.

Ha*Ash

- Ashley Grace – vocals, guitar
- Hanna Nicole – vocals, guitar

Additional personnel

- Áureo Baqueiro – songwriting, recording engineer, arranger, director
- Salvador Rizo – songwriting.
- Gerardo García – guitar, acoustic guitar, mandoline.
- Tommy Morgan – harmonica.
- Gabe Witcher – violin.

== Charts ==
Chart	Position
Mexico (Monitor Latino)	4

== Release history ==
Region	Date	Edition(s)	Format	Label	Ref.
Various	June 8, 2005	Standard	CD Single	Sony Music Latin	
Various	December 6, 2019	Live Version	Digital download; streaming	Sony Music Latin	
