= Ojalá (Ha*Ash song) =

Song by Ha*Ash

from the album 30 de Febrero
- Released: 17 November 2017
- Recorded: 2017 in Miami, United States
- Genre: Latin pop; pop
- Length: 3:27
- Label: Sony Music Latin
- Songwriters: Ashley Grace Pérez; Hanna Nicole Pérez; Pablo Preciado
- Producers: Hanna Nicole; George Noriega

Lyrics video
- "Ojalá" on YouTube

"Ojalá" (transl. "Hopefully") is a song by American duo Ha*Ash for their fifth studio album "30 de Febrero" (2017). A live version was included on their album Ha*Ash: En Vivo (2019). It was written by Ashley Grace, Hanna Nicole, Pablo Preciado and Paolo Stefanoni while the song was produced by Hanna Nicole and George Noriega.

== Background and composition ==
The track was released digitally on November 17, 2017, by Sony Music Entertainment México as a promotional tool for the album, which was released on fourteen days. The song takes place in an office setting and has the vibe of a pop song, that shows many texts between the girls and the guy who is an ex lover of Ashley.

The band started working on the song during the 1F Hecho Realidad Tour. It was written by Ashley Grace, Hanna Nicole and Pablo Preciado and produced by Hanna and George Noriega. The song was recorded at Miami, United States in 2017. No official music video has been released.

== Commercial performance ==
On February 1, 2019, the song was certified gold in Mexico.

== Music video ==
A lyric video for "Ojalá" was released on November 17, 2017. It was directed by Diego Álvarez. As of October 2019, the video has over 52 million views on YouTube.

The music video for "Ojalá", recorded live for the live album Ha*Ash: En Vivo, was released on December 6, 2019. The video was filmed in Auditorio Nacional, Mexico City.

== Live performances ==
Ha*Ash included "Ojalá" on her "Gira 100 Años Contigo" (2018–2019).

== Credits and personnel ==
Credits adapted from Genius.

Recording and management

- Recording Country: United States
- Sony / ATV Discos Music Publishing LLC / Westwood Publishing
- (P) 2017 Sony Music Entertainment México, S.A. De C.V.

Ha*Ash

- Ashley Grace – vocals, guitar, songwriting
- Hanna Nicole – vocals, guitar, songwriting, production

Additional personnel

- Pablo Preciado – songwriting
- Paolo Stefanoni – songwriting
- Pate Wallace – keyboards, engineer, editor
- Diego Contento – engineer
- Dave Clauss – engineer
- George Noriega – engineer, editor, director, bass
- Matt Calderín – drums

== Certifications ==
| Region | Certification | Certified units/sales |
|---|---|---|
| Mexico (AMPROFON) | Gold | 30,000^{‡} |
^{‡} Sales+streaming figures based on certification alone.

== Charts ==
=== Year-end charts ===
| Chart (2018) | Position |
|---|---|
| El Salvador (Monitor Latino) | 97 |

== Release history ==
| Region | Date | Edition(s) | Format | Label | Ref. |
|---|---|---|---|---|---|
| Various | December 1, 2017 | Standard | Digital download; streaming | Sony Music Latin | |
| Various | December 6, 2019 | Live Version | Digital download; streaming | Sony Music Latin | |
