= Eso No Va a Suceder =

Single by Ha*Ash

from the album 30 de Febrero
- Language: Spanish
- English title: "That's Not Going To Happen"
- Released: 8 August 2018
- Recorded: 2017 in Miami, United States
- Genre: Latin pop; pop
- Length: 3:40
- Label: Sony Music Latin
- Songwriters: Ashley Grace Pérez; Hanna Nicole Pérez; Edgar Barrera
- Producers: Edge; Joe London; Hanna Nicole (co.)

Ha*Ash singles chronology
"No Pasa Nada" (2018)	"Eso No Va a Suceder" (2018)	"¿Qué Me Faltó?" (2019)

Music video
- "Eso No Va a Suceder" on YouTube

"Eso No Va a Suceder" (transl. "That's Not Going To Happen") is a song written and recorded by the American musical duo Ha*Ash. It was released on August 8, 2018 as the third of the single from their fifth studio album 30 de Febrero (2017). The song then included on their live album Ha*Ash: En Vivo (2019). It was written by Ashley Grace, Hanna Nicole and Edgar Barrera.

== Background and release ==
"Eso No Va a Suceder" was written by Ashley Grace, Hanna Nicole and Edgar Barrera and produced by Hanna, Barrera and Joe London. The band started working on the song during the 1F Hecho Realidad Tour. It was confirmed the single to be the third single from the album on August 6, 2018. The song went to Latin radio stations in early September.

== Music video ==
A lyric video for "Eso No Va a Suceder" was released on November 28, 2017. It was directed by Diego Álvarez. Here they are dressed in white wedding dresses with yet another classy style. Some scenes show a white dress burning and torn, while Hanna is seen smashing a wedding cake. As of October 2019, the video has over 55 million views on YouTube.

The music video for "Eso No Va a Suceder" was released on August 8, 2018. It was directed by Emiliano Castro and Ernesto Lomeli. The video was filmed in Toluca, México. The video stars Ha*Ash with actress Renata Notni, TV host Natalia Téllez, and Instagram influencer Dhasia Wezka. As of October 2019, the video has over 90 million views on YouTube.

The acoustic video for "Eso No Va a Suceder" was released on September 28, 2018. As of October 2019, the video has over 1.5 million views on YouTube.

The live video for "Eso No Va a Suceder", recorded live for the live album Ha*Ash: En Vivo, was released on December 6, 2019. The video was filmed in Auditorio Nacional, Mexico City.

== Commercial performance ==
The track peaked at number 34 in the Latin Pop Songs charts in the United States. In Mexico, the song peaked at number one on the Mexican Singles Chart, and Monitor Latino. On November 11, 2018 the song was certified gold in México. On September 17, the song was certified Platinum in México.

== Live performances ==
On November 11, 2018, the duo appeared on Premios Telehit, and also performed "Eso No Va a Suceder".

== Credits and personnel ==
Credits adapted from Genius.

Recording and management

- Recording Country: United States
- Sony / ATV Discos Music Publishing LLC / Westwood Publishing
- (P) 2017 Sony Music Entertainment México, S.A. De C.V.

Ha*Ash

- Ashley Grace – vocals, guitar, songwriting
- Hanna Nicole – vocals, guitar, songwriting, production

Additional personnel

- Edgar Barrera – songwriting, edition, engineer, production
- Joe London – edition, engineer, production
- Luis Barrera Jr – edition

== Charts ==
=== Weekly charts ===
Chart (2018)	Peak position
Mexico (Monitor Latino)	4
Mexico (Monitor Latino)	1
Mexico (Billboard Mexican Airplay)	7
Mexico (Billboard Espanol Airplay)	1
US Latin Pop Songs (Billboard)	34

=== Year-end charts ===
2018 year-end chart performance for "Esto No Va a Suceder"
Chart (2018)	Position
Costa Rica (Monitor Latino)	95
Mexico (Monitor Latino)	17
Mexico Top 100 Touch (Monitor Latino)	38
Uruguay (Monitor Latino)	100

2019 year-end chart performance for "Esto No Va a Suceder"
Chart (2019)	Position
Costa Rica (Monitor Latino)	90

== Certifications ==
Region	Certification	Certified units/sales
Mexico (AMPROFON)	Platinum+Gold	90,000^{‡}
^{‡} Sales+streaming figures based on certification alone.

== Release history ==
Region	Date	Edition(s)	Format	Label	Ref.
Various	August 8, 2018	Standard	Digital download; streaming	Sony Music Latin	
Various	September 28, 2018	Acoustic Version	Digital download; streaming	Sony Music Latin	
Various	December 6, 2019	Live Version	Digital download; streaming	Sony Music Latin	
