= Destino o Casualidad =

Single by Melendi featuring Ha*Ash

from the album Quítate las Gafas
- Released: 2 June 2017
- Genre: Latin pop, pop
- Length: 4:19
- Label: Sony Music Spain
- Songwriter: Melendi

Melendi singles chronology
"La Casa No Es Igual" (2017)	"Destino o Casualidad" (2017)	"Yo Me Veo Contigo" (2017)

Ha*Ash singles chronology
"Mi Niña Mujer" (2016)	"Destino o Casualidad" (2017)	"100 Años" (2017)

Music video
- "Destino o Casualidad" on YouTube

"Destino o Casualidad" is a song by Spanish singer Melendi featuring American duo Ha*Ash. It was released on 2 June 2017 as the third single from his eighth studio album Quítate las Gafas (2017) and then included on Ha*Ash's live album Ha*Ash: En Vivo (2019).

== Music video ==
The music video for "Destino o Casualidad" was directed by Willy Rodríguez. Filming took place in 2017 in New York. As of February 2025, the video has over 1.2 billion views on YouTube.

The second video for "Destino o Casualidad", recorded live for Ha*Ash's live album Ha*Ash: En Vivo, was released on 6 December 2019. The video was filmed in Auditorio Nacional, Mexico City.

== Live performances ==
Melendi and Ha*Ash performed "Destino o Casualidad" live together for the first time at the concert in Buenos Aires, Argentina on 2 June 2017. They performed together again on Santiago, Chile on 3 June 2017 and City Mexico, Mexico on 11 November 2017.

== Track listings ==
- Digital download
1. Destino o Casualidad (featuring Ha*Ash) – 4:18

== Charts ==
Chart (2017)	Peak position
Mexico (Billboard Mexican Airplay)	32
Mexico (Billboard Espanol Airplay)	10
Spain (Promusicae)	56
US Latin Pop Airplay (Billboard)	38

== Certifications ==
Region	Certification	Certified units/sales
Mexico (AMPROFON)	Platinum	60,000^{‡}
Spain (Promusicae)	Platinum	40,000^{‡}
United States (RIAA)	Gold (Latin)	30,000^{‡}
^{‡} Sales+streaming figures based on certification alone.

== Release history ==
Region	Date	Format	Version	Label	Ref.
World	2 June 2017	Digital download	Ha*Ash remix	Sony Music Spain	
