= Erika Ender =

Panamanian-American singer and songwriter

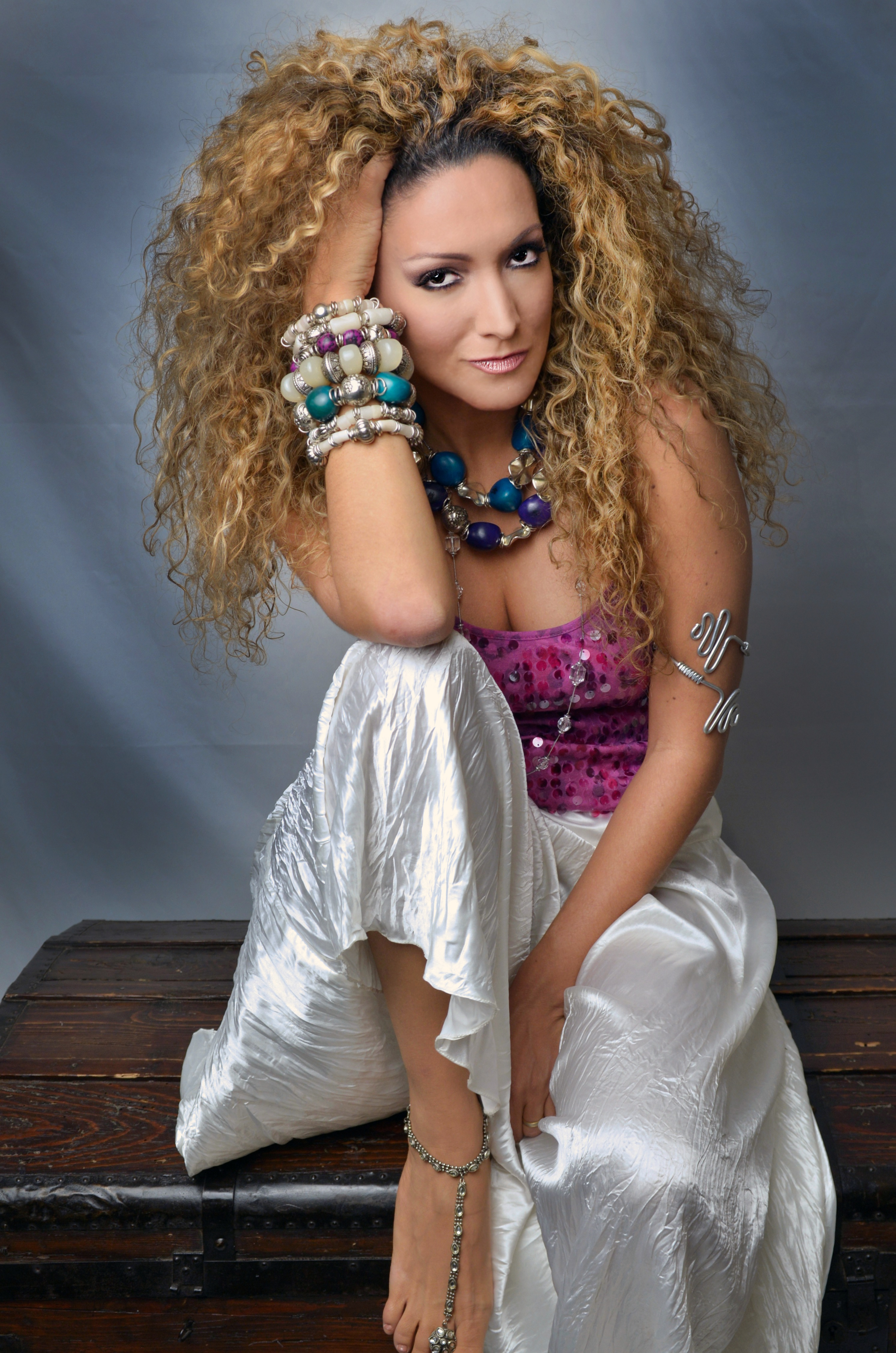
- Ender in 2014

Background information
- Born: Erika María Ender Simoes; 21 December 1974 (age 51); Panama City, Panama
- Genres: Latin pop; pop rock
- Occupations: Singer; songwriter
- Website: erikaender.com

Erika María Ender Simoes (born 21 December 1974) is a Panamanian-American and Brazilian singer and songwriter. In addition to her singing career, Ender is considered one of the most important and prolific composers in the Latin music market today. Along with Luis Fonsi and Daddy Yankee, she is the co-writer of the worldwide hit "Despacito".

== Early life ==
Ender was born in Panama City, the daughter of a Panamanian-American father and Brazilian mother. Due to her roots, she grew up in a multicultural and trilingual home, so she writes, sings and composes songs in Spanish, Portuguese and English. Ender currently resides in Miami, Florida.

== Career ==
As a singer, Ender has released five CDs—three of them international—in a variety of genres such as pop, rock, tropical and regional Mexican. Her musical versatility has made it possible for stars such as Daddy Yankee, Chayanne, Gloria Trevi, Ednita Nazario, Gilberto Santa Rosa, Ana Bárbara, Víctor Manuelle, Los Horóscopos de Durango, Milly Quezada, Elvis Crespo, Giselle, Melina León, Ha*Ash, Prince Royce, Akon, José Luis Rodríguez "El Puma", Luis Enrique, Luis Fonsi, Malú, Jaci Velásquez, and Azúcar Moreno, to interpret their songs.

Her successful career as a songwriter includes the albums Abreme La Puerta, Cueste Lo Que Cueste and En Concierto. Topping the Billboards with singles like "Cheque Al Portador" (2004), "Abreme La Puerta" (2004), "Luna Nueva" (2006), "Quien Sale... No Entra" (2006), "Masoquista" (2009), "Cadê?" and "Sigo Caminando", among others, have led to her performing in multiple countries.

A great accomplishment as a composer was when in 2004 her theme "Cheque Al Portador" allowed Ender to qualify at the International Song Festival of Viña del Mar, where she represented her native Panama for the first time in the 45 years since the event began in 1960.

In January 2017, "Despacito", featuring Daddy Yankee and Luis Fonsi and co-written by Ender, was promoted and released. The music video reached 6 billion views, with the song becoming number 1 in nearly every Latin Billboard chart.

== Awards ==
- Latin Billboard
- SESAC-Song Of The Year (2010)
- ASCAP
- Latin Grammy Awards
- Monitor Latino
- La Musa Latin Songwriters Hall of Fame Awards – 2017
- Premio Faro Cultural 2017 – Comunicad (Washington, DC)
- Best Mexican Regional Song 2016 – Latin Grammy
- Leading Ladies of Entertainment 2017 – Latin Recording Academy of Arts and Sciences
- Song of the Year 2017 – Latin Grammy
- Global Icon Award 2018 – SEASAC Latina Music Awards
- Top Latin Song 2018 – Billboard Music
- Horizon Award 2018 – The National Hispanic Foundation for the Arts
- Humanitarian Award 2018 – TJ Martell Foundation (Los Angeles, California)
- Top Hot 100 Canciones 2018 – Billboard Music
- Top Latin Song 2018 – Billboard Music
- Streaming Song of the Year 2018 – Latin Billboard
- Canción Pop Latina del Año 2018 – Billboard Latino
- Airplay Song of the Year 2018 – Billboard Latino
- Digital Song of the Year 2018 – Billboard Latino
- Top Selling Song 2018 – Billboard Latino
- Song of the Year 2018 – SESAC Latina Music Awards
- She Rocks Awards 2019 – Dreaming out Loud She Rocks Women in Music
- Philanthropy Award 2019 – Cala Foundation

== Filmography ==
Cinema: Grandpa (2011), directed by Joseph Medina and produced by Edgardo Franco, better known as 'The General'. It is the story of a grandfather and his grandson, who carry a close relationship of respect and affection. Unfortunately everything changes when the grandfather suffers an automobile accident and has to be admitted to a nursing home.

International trade: Miami Herald, Florida Lottery, MCI (along with María Celeste Arrarás) and AmericaTel along with Don Francisco.

Musical Theatre: The Narrator of José El Soñador, directed by the famous Bruce Quinn.

=== Judge or celebrity ===
- Idol Kids Puerto Rico (2012) (next to Servando and Florentino, Edgardo Díaz and Carlos Ponce); Produced by FreeMantle Media for Wapa TV Puerto Rico.
- IDOL PUERTO RICO (2011) (along with Ricardo Montaner, Jerry Rivera and Carlos "Topy" Mamery); Produced by FreeMantle Media for Wapa TV Puerto Rico.
- Batalla de las Américas (2009) with María Conchita Alonso and Julio Iglesias Jr. (MEGA TV – USA, CHAIN 3 – Mexico and Venevisión International for Latin America).
- Dímelo Bailando (2004) (Mega TV – USA).
- Vive La Música on TVN Channel 2 – Panama.

=== Co-producer of programs ===
- La Cuerda
- Vital (Fox World, Channel 8, Miami, USA).

=== Presenter ===
- Life @ Online (Life Online): Discovery Channel USA and Latin America (1998–1999).
- El Mix del Fin de Semana: Telemetro Panamá (1995–1996).
- Salsarengue: Telemetro Panama (1995).
- Son de Sabor (segment Son del Patio): RPC TV Channel 4, Panama (1994).
- Eventos Especiales: TVN Channel 2, (1993–1994).
