= No Pasa Nada =

Single by Ha*Ash

from the album 30 de Febrero
- Language: Spanish
- English title: "Nothing Happens"
- Released: 8 March 2018
- Recorded: 2017 in Miami, United States
- Genre: power ballad
- Length: 3:14
- Label: Sony Music Latin
- Songwriters: Ashley Grace Pérez; Hanna Nicole Pérez; José Luis Ortega
- Producers: George Noriega; Hanna Nicole (co.)

Ha*Ash singles chronology
| "100 Años" (2017) | "No Pasa Nada" (2018) | "Eso No Va a Suceder" (2018) |

Music video
- "No Pasa Nada" on YouTube

"No Pasa Nada" (transl. "Nothing Happens") is a song written and recorded by the American musical duo Ha*Ash. It was released on March 8, 2018, as the second of the single from their fifth studio album 30 de Febrero (2017). The song then included on their live album Ha*Ash: En Vivo (2019). It was written by Ashley Grace, Hanna Nicole and José Luis Ortega.

== Background and release ==
"No Pasa Nada" was written by Ashley Grace, Hanna Nicole and José Luis Ortega and produced by Hanna Nicole and George Noriega. The band started working on the song during the 1F Hecho Realidad Tour. It was confirmed the single to be the second single from the album on March 5, 2018. Finally, it was released on March 8, 2018.

On October 3, 2018, Ha*Ash became the first Latin singers to be featured in the Spotify Singles concept, publishing a new version of "No Pasa Nada", and a cover of "Adiós Amor".

== Music video ==
A lyric video for "No Pasa Nada" was released on December 1, 2017, the same day the album dropped. It was directed by Diego Álvarez. As of June 2023, the video has over 155 million views on YouTube.

The music video for "No Pasa Nada" was released on March 8, 2018. It was directed by Pablo Croce. As of June 2023, the video has over 76 million views on YouTube.

The acoustic video for "No Pasa Nada" was released on June 29, 2018. As of October 2019, the video has over 11 million views on YouTube.

The live video for "No Pasa Nada", recorded live for the live album Ha*Ash: En Vivo, was released on December 6, 2019. The video was filmed in Auditorio Nacional, Mexico City.As of June 2023, the video has over 8 million views on YouTube.

== Commercial performance ==
The track peaked at number 13 in the Mexico Airplay, number 4 in the Mexico Espanol Airplay charts in the México at number two on the Monitor Latino. On September 6, 2018, the song was certified gold in México. On February 1, 2019, it was announced that No Pasa Nada had been certified Platinum. On March 20, 2020, the song was certified double Platinum.

== Live performances ==
On November 11, 2018, the duo appeared on Premios Telehit, and also performed "No Pasa Nada".

== Credits and personnel ==
Credits adapted from Genius.

Recording and management

- Recording Country: United States
- Sony / ATV Discos Music Publishing LLC / Westwood Publishing
- (P) 2017 Sony Music Entertainment México, S.A. De C.V.

Ha*Ash

- Ashley Grace – vocals, guitar, songwriting
- Hanna Nicole – vocals, guitar, songwriting, production

Additional personnel

- José Luis Ortega – songwriting
- Diego Contento – engineer
- Dave Clauss – engineer
- Pete Wallace – engineer, edition, keyboards
- George Noriega – engineer, edition, director, keyboards, guitar
- Matt Calderín – drums

== Charts ==
=== Weekly charts ===
| Chart (2018) | Peak position |
|---|---|
| Mexico (Monitor Latino) | 2 |
| Mexico (Billboard Mexican Airplay) | 13 |
| Mexico (Billboard Espanol Airplay) | 4 |
| Spain (PROMUSICAE) | 46 |

=== Year-end charts ===
2019 year-end chart performance for "No Pasa Nada"
| Chart (2019) | Position |
|---|---|
| Bolivia (Monitor Latino) | 63 |
| Costa Rica (Monitor Latino) | 11 |
| Mexico (Monitor Latino - Top 100 Audience) | 13 |
| Mexico (Monitor Latino - Top 100 Touch) | 18 |
| Uruguay (Monitor Latino) | 29 |

== Certifications ==
| Region | Certification | Certified units/sales |
|---|---|---|
| Mexico (AMPROFON) | 4× Platinum+Gold | 270,000^{‡} |
^{‡} Sales+streaming figures based on certification alone.

== Awards and nominations ==
| Year | Awards ceremony | Award | Results |
|---|---|---|---|
| 2018 | Premios Quiero | Best Music Video Woman | Nominated |
| 2018 | Premios Quiero | Best Music Video | Nominated |

== Release history ==
| Region | Date | Edition(s) | Format | Label | Ref. |
|---|---|---|---|---|---|
| Various | March 8, 2018 | Standard | Digital download; streaming | Sony Music Latin | |
| Various | October 3, 2018 | Spotify Version | Streaming | Sony Music México | |
| Various | December 6, 2019 | Live Version | Digital download; streaming | Sony Music Latin | |
