= ¿Qué Me Faltó? =

Single by Ha*Ash

from the album 30 de Febrero
- Language: Spanish
- English title: "What did I lack?"
- Released: 4 January 2019
- Recorded: 2017 in Miami, United States
- Genre: power ballad
- Length: 3:22
- Label: Sony Music Latin
- Songwriters: Ashley Grace Pérez; Hanna Nicole Pérez; José Luis Ortega
- Producers: George Noriega; Hanna Nicole (co.)

Ha*Ash singles chronology
| "Eso No Va a Suceder" (2018) | "¿Qué Me Faltó?" (2019) | "Si Tú No Vuelves" (2019) |

Music video
- "¿Qué Me Faltó?" on YouTube

"¿Qué Me Faltó?" (transl. "What did I lack?") is a song written and recorded by the American musical duo Ha*Ash. It was released on January 4, 2019, as the fourth of the single from their fifth studio album 30 de Febrero (2017). The song then included on their live album Ha*Ash: En Vivo (2019). It was written by Ashley Grace, Hanna Nicole and José Luis Ortega.

== Background and release ==
"¿Qué Me Faltó?" was written by Ashley Grace, Hanna Nicole and José Luis Ortega and produced by Hanna and George Noriega. The band started working on the song during the 1F Hecho Realidad Tour. It was confirmed the single to be the third single from the album on January 4, 2019. The song went to Latin radio stations in early November, 2018.

== Music video ==
The music video was released on January 4 on the Ha*Ash's YouTube and the other video channels. The clip was recorded in the beach in Oaxaca, México. It was under the direction by Toño Tzinzun. As of October 2019, the video has over 40 million views on YouTube.

The live video for "¿Qué Me Faltó?", recorded live for the live album Ha*Ash: En Vivo, was released on December 6, 2019. The video was filmed in Auditorio Nacional, Mexico City.

== Commercial performance ==
The track peaked two on the Monitor Latino in Mexico. In August 2019, the songs was certified as Gold in Mexico.

== Live performances ==
Ha*Ash performed "¿Qué Me Faltó?" for the first time at the program "Al Aire Con Paola Rojas" on December 6, 2017.

== Credits and personnel ==
Credits adapted from Genius.

Recording and management

- Recording Country: United States
- Sony / ATV Discos Music Publishing LLC / Westwood Publishing
- (P) 2017 Sony Music Entertainment México, S.A. De C.V.

Ha*Ash

- Ashley Grace – vocals, guitar, songwriting
- Hanna Nicole – vocals, guitar, songwriting, production

Additional personnel

- Pete Wallace – keyboards, editor, engineer
- Diego Contento – engineer
- Dave Clauss – engineer
- George Noriega – engineer, director, guitar
- Matt Calderín – drums

== Charts ==
=== Weekly charts ===
| Chart (2019) | Peak position |
|---|---|
| Mexico (Monitor Latino) | 2 |
| Mexico Top 100 (Monitor Latino) | 8 |

=== Year-end charts ===
2019 year-end chart performance for "¿Qué Me Faltó?"
| Chart (2019) | Position |
|---|---|
| Costa Rica (Monitor Latino) | 13 |
| Mexico (Monitor Latino) | 17 |
| Mexico Top 100 Touch (Monitor Latino) | 49 |

== Certifications ==
| Region | Certification | Certified units/sales |
|---|---|---|
| Mexico (AMPROFON) | 2× Platinum | 120,000^{‡} |
^{‡} Sales+streaming figures based on certification alone.

== Release history ==
| Region | Date | Edition(s) | Format | Label | Ref. |
|---|---|---|---|---|---|
| Various | January 4, 2019 | Standard | Digital download; streaming | Sony Music Latin | |
| Various | December 6, 2019 | Live Version | Digital download; streaming | Sony Music Latin | |
