= Odio Amarte =

Single by Ha*Ash

from the album Ha*Ash
- Language: Spanish
- English title: "I Hate to Love You"
- Released: 23 April 2002
- Recorded: 2002
- Genre: Latin pop; country
- Length: 3:30
- Label: Sony Music Latin
- Songwriters: Ashley Grace Pérez; Hanna Nicole Pérez; Áureo Baqueiro
- Producer: Áureo Baqueiro

Ha*Ash singles chronology
"Odio Amarte" (2002)	"Estés Donde Estés" (2003)

Music video
- "Odio Amarte" on YouTube

"Odio Amarte" (transl. "I Hate to Love You") is the debut single by American duo Ha*Ash. It was first included on Ha*Ash's first studio album Ha*Ash (2003) where it was released as the first single on April 23, 2002 and then included on their live albums Primera Fila: Hecho Realidad (2014) and Ha*Ash: En Vivo (2019). It was written by Ashley Grace, Hanna Nicole and Áureo Baqueiro and produced by Baqueiro.

== Background and release ==
"Odio Amarte" was written by Ashley Grace, Hanna Nicole and Áureo Baqueiro and produced by Baqueiro. It serves as the two track to her first studio album Ha*Ash (2003), and then recorded live for his live album Primera Fila: Hecho Realidad in 2014.

== Commercial performance ==
The track peaked at number 2 in the Monitor Latino charts in the Mexico.

== Music video ==
A music video for "Odio Amarte" was released in 2003. Was published on her YouTube channel on April 24, 2010. As of October 2019, the video has over 20 million views on YouTube.

The second music video for "Odio Amarte" recorded live for his album "A Tiempo" edition deluxe (DVD) was released on 2012. As of October 2019, the video has over 5 million views on YouTube.

The third music video for "Odio Amarte", recorded live for the live album Primera Fila: Hecho Realidad, was released on May 8, 2015. It was directed by Nahuel Lerena. The video was filmed in Estudios Churubusco, City Mexico. As of October 2019, the video has over 54 million views on YouTube.

The four video for "Odio Amarte", recorded live for the live album En Vivo, was released on December 6, 2019. The video was filmed in Auditorio Nacional, Mexico City.

== Credits and personnel ==
Credits adapted from AllMusic and Genius.

Recording and management

- Recording Country: México
- Sony / ATV Discos Music Publishing LLC / Westwood Publishing
- (P) 2003 Sony Music Entertainment México, S.A. De C.V. (studio version)
- (P) 2014 Sony Music Entertainment México, S.A. De C.V. (live version)

Ha*Ash

- Ashley Grace – songwriting, vocals, guitar (studio version / live version)
- Hanna Nicole – songwriting, vocals, guitar (studio version / live version)

Additional personnel

- Áureo Baqueiro – songwriting, recording engineer, arranger, director (studio version)
- Armando Ávila – guitar, acoustic guitar, recording engineer (studio version)
- Rodolfo Cruz – recording engineer (studio version)
- Áureo Baqueiro – songwriting (live version)
- Pablo De La Loza – co-producer, co-director (live version)
- George Noriega – producer (live version)
- Tim Mitchell – producer (live version)

== Charts ==
Chart	Position
Mexico (Monitor Latino)	2

== Release history ==
Region	Date	Edition(s)	Format	Label	Ref.
Mexico	April 13, 2003	Standard	Single	Sony Music México	
Various	November 11, 2014	Live Version	Digital download; streaming	Sony Music Latin	
Various	December 6, 2019	Live Version	Digital download; streaming	Sony Music Latin	
