= Auditorio Nacional (Mexico) =

Entertainment center in Mexico City, Mexico

- Coloso de Reforma
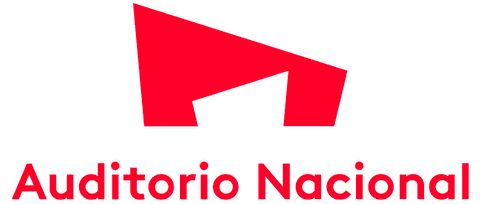

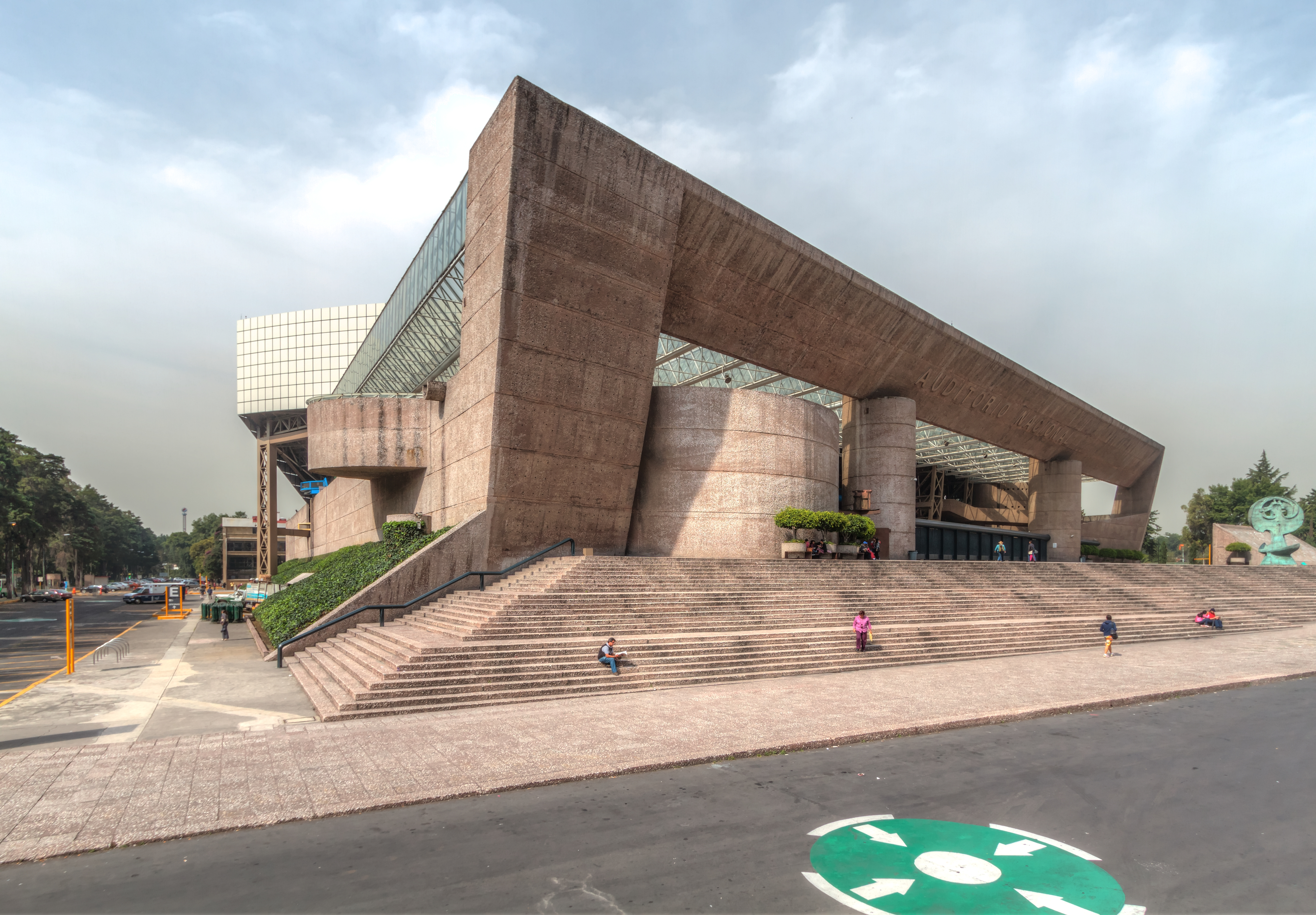
- Location in Mexico City
- Former names: Auditorio Municipal
- Location: Mexico City, Mexico
- Coordinates: 19°25′29″N 99°11′41.70″W
- Capacity: 9,366
- Public transit: Auditorio

Construction
- Opened: 1952
- Renovated: 1991
- Architects: Fernando Peña; Ingenieros Óscar de Buen y Guillermo Salazar Polanco; Teodoro González de León (remodel); Abraham Zabludovsky(remodel)

Website
- www.auditorio.com.mx

National Auditorium (Spanish: Auditorio Nacional) is an entertainment center at Paseo de la Reforma #50, Chapultepec in Mexico City.

The National Auditorium is considered among the world's best venues by specialized media. It was designed by Mexican architects Pedro Ramírez Vázquez and Gonzalo Ramírez del Sordo, and remodeled by Abraham Zabludovsky and Teodoro González de León. Concerts, art, theatre, dance, and more are hosted at the venue.

It also has a small venue available for smaller events, called Lunario. The auditorium's total seating capacity is currently 9,366, and it also has two levels of parking and a stage 23 meters high by 23 meters wide.

== History ==
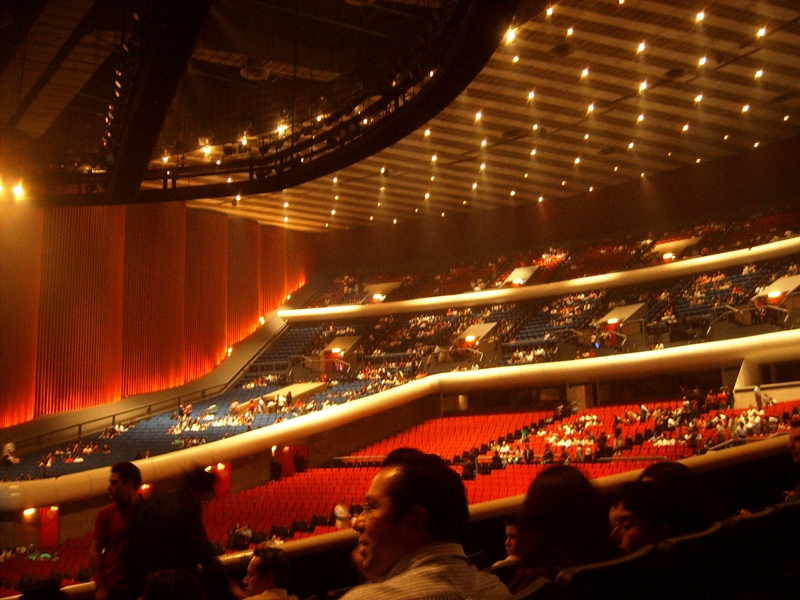
Interior of the National Auditorium

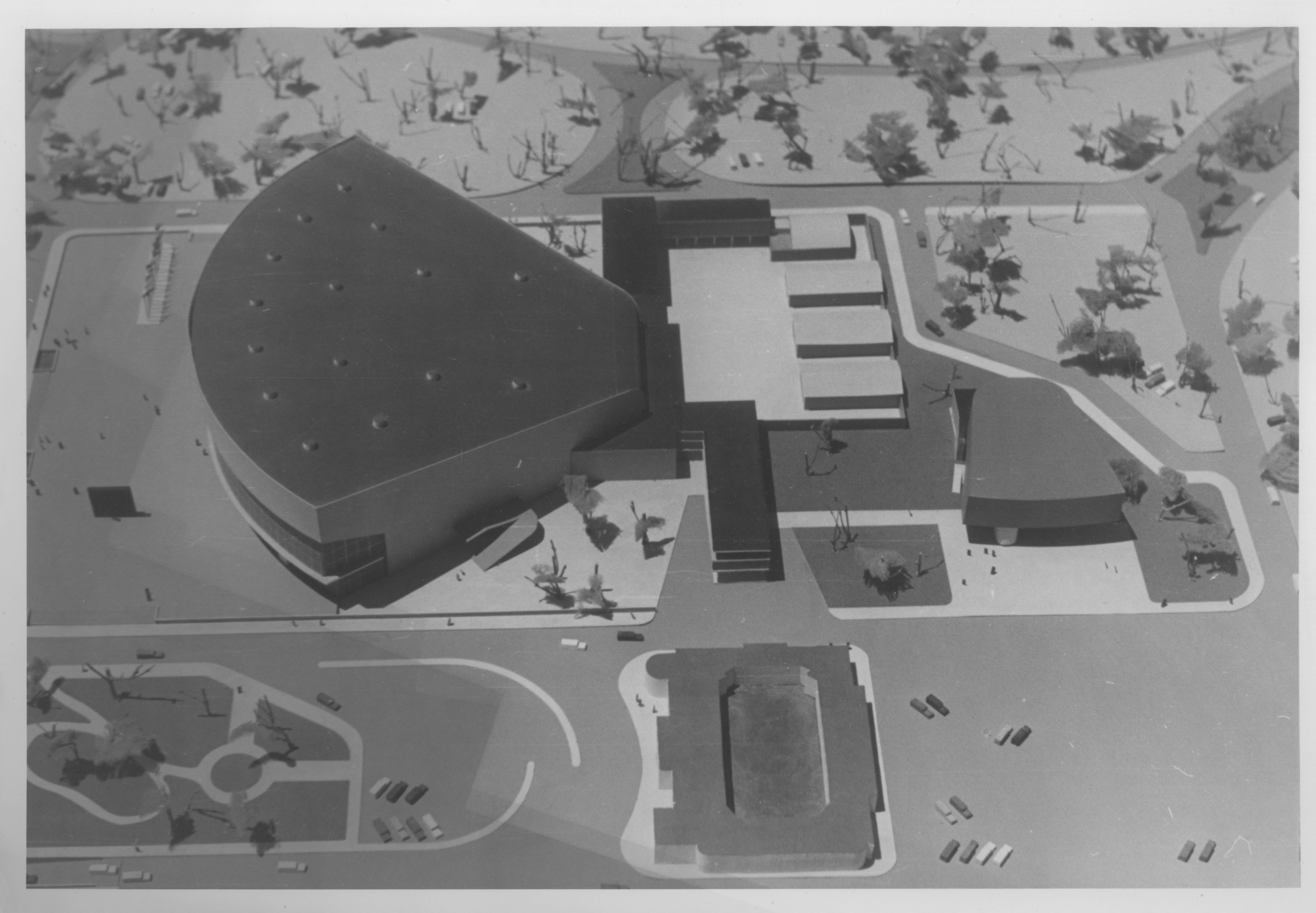
Mockup of the original auditorium.

Constructed in 1952, it was used for volleyball and basketball matches of the 1954 Central American and Caribbean Games and had seen performances of the San Francisco Ballet and New York Philharmonic in 1958. The auditorium was the venue for the gymnastics events at the 1968 Summer Olympics.

Since the 1970s, it has been used primarily for international music, song, dance and film festivals, fairs and exhibitions.

From 1988 to 1990, the auditorium went through an 18-months-long renovation, designed by architects Abraham Zaludovsky and Teodoro Gonzalez de Leon, which brought it to the current design.

It hosted the OTI Festival in 1981 and 1984, and Miss Universe pageants in 1993 and 2007.

On August 12, 1998, Barney, Baby Bop, BJ and their friends: Professor Tinkerputt & Mother Goose performed here during the Mexican tour for Barney's Big Surprise.

In 2007, the American magazine Pollstar made the National Auditorium a nominee for International Theatre of the Year.

In November 2007, the Auditorio Nacional won the Billboard Touring Award for best concert venue under 10,000 seats.

Auditorio Nacional houses the largest pipe organ in Latin America, with a 5 manual console and 250 ranks of pipes. Installed by Tamburini in 1958, it incorporates the pipework from the 1934 Kornix organ of 4 manuals and 100 ranks which was formerly in the Palacio de Bellas Artes with significant additions by Tamburini.

In 2016, it hosted the premiere of the largely anticipated comic-book film, Batman v Superman: Dawn of Justice. In 2024, it hosted the world premiere of Dune: Part Two.

In 2026, it hosted the countdown concert for the 2026 FIFA World Cup, which featured performances Los Ángeles Azules, Belinda, Elena Rose, and Andrea Bocelli.

Preceded by Queen Sirikit National Convention Center (Thailand) Bangkok; Shrine Auditorium (United States) Los Angeles	Miss Universe venue 1993; 2007	Succeeded by Philippine International Convention Center (Philippines) Pasay; Crown Convention Center (Vietnam) Nha Trang
