= List of Ha*Ash concert tours =

Ha*Ash live performances
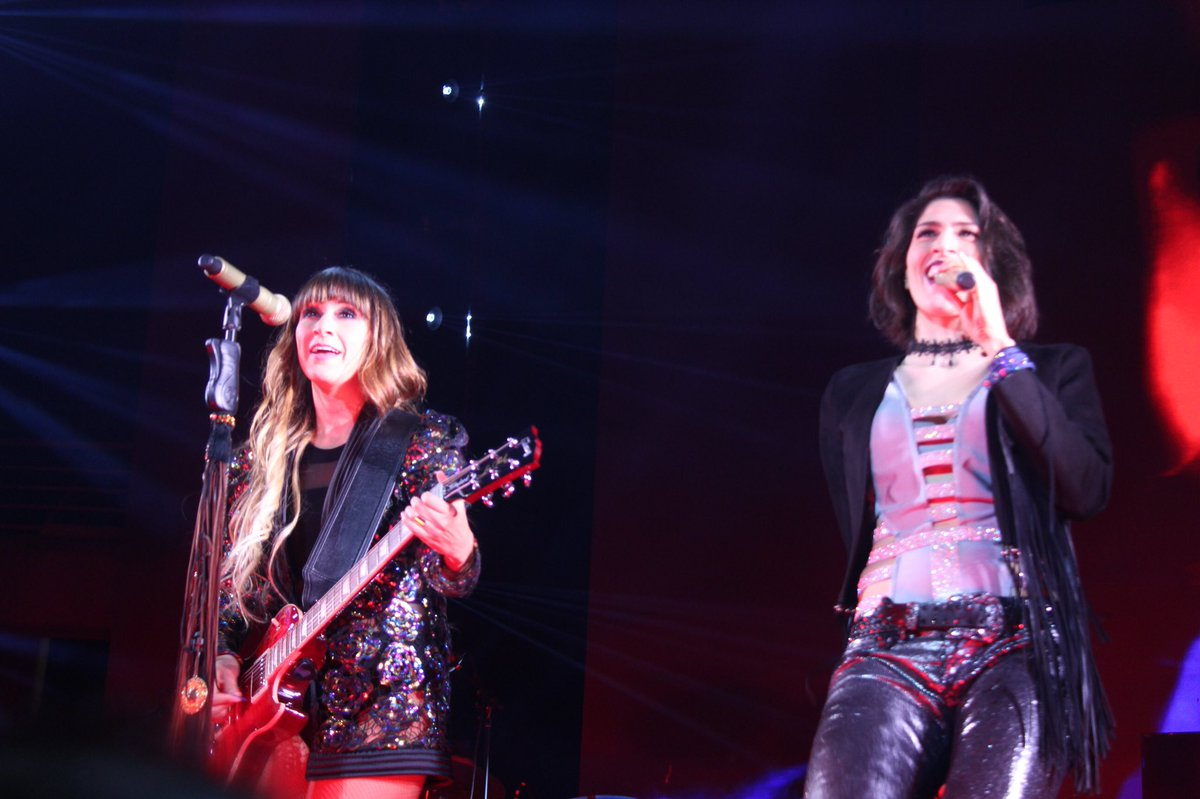
- Ha*Ash performing live in 2018.
- Headlining tours: 6
- Supporting tours: 3
- Promotional tours: 1

American Latin pop duo Ha*Ash has embarked on six tours as a headlining artist and two tour as a supporting act. On April 23, 2002, they released their debut single, "Odio Amarte". They recorded their self-titled first album Ha*Ash with the Mexican producer Áureo Baqueiro in 2003.

The band spent 2003 and 2007 on a 300-Concert Tour around Mexico promoting the album. After this, they performed in the Teatro Metropolitan in Mexico City. During 2009, Ha*Ash continued their album promotion throughout America. They also appeared in the Reventour, a series of concerts in several places in Mexico. In 2011, the duo released a fourth studio album, entitled, A Tiempo. To promote the album, Ha*Ash embarked on a world concert tour during 2011 and 2013. In early 2011, they toured shortly in Mexico, most notably as part of Shakira's The Sun Comes Out World Tour for three of his shows in Mexico.

On September 17, 2015, Ha*Ash were the opening acts on Ricky Martin's One World Tour for some of his shows in the U.S. They started their own Primera Fila Tour in 2015, visiting Argentina, Costa Rica, Chile, Dominican Republic, Ecuador, El Salvador, Guatemala, Mexico, Peru, Spain, Uruguay, USA and Venezuela. In 2017, they issued 30 de Febrero, to promote the album, Ha*Ash embarked on a world concert tour called Gira 100 años contigo in 2018 and 2020. After completing the tour Gira 100 Años Contigo in February 2020, due to the COVID-19 pandemic, Ha*Ash left the stage and did not return until may 2021, where the band performed at 5 shows at outdoor venues in Mexico.

== Concert tours ==
Title	Dates	Associated album(s)	Place	Shows	Ref.
Ha*Ash Tour	Exact date unknown	Ha*Ash	North America	Over 150 concerts	
The Ha*Ash Tour was Ha*Ash's debut tour. It promoted their first album, Ha*Ash. The tour visited only North America, with Ha*Ash over 150 concerts during a 2-year period. The band spent 2003 and 2004 on a 150-Concert Tour around Mexico promoting the album. Also, they received the opportunity to play for the first time in the Teatro Metropólitan in Mexico City.
Mundos Opuestos Tour	October 22, 2005 – Exact date unknown	Mundos Opuestos	North America	Over 150 concerts	
The Mundos Opuestos Tour was Ha*Ash's second tour. It promoted their second studio album, Mundos Opuestos. The tour visited only North America, with Ha*Ash over 150 concerts during a 2-year period. Also, they performed in the Teatro Metropolitan in Mexico City with three dates in the middle of July 2007.
Habitación Doble Tour	August 24, 2008 – May 19, 2010	Habitación Doble	North America & Europe	Over 100 concerts	
The Habitación Doble Tour was Ha*Ash's third concert tour. It promoted their third studio album, Habitación Doble. The tour visited Europe and North America, with Ha*Ash performing over 100 concerts during a 2-year period. On May 24, 2009, they received the opportunity to play for the first time in the Auditorio Nacional of Mexico City.
A Tiempo Tour	September 24, 2011 – May 17, 2013	A Tiempo	Americas & Europe	131	
The A Tiempo Tour was Ha*Ash's fourth tour and the second, which visited North America and Europe. It promoted their fourth studio albums, A Tiempo. The tour began on September 24, 2011 in Auditorio Nacional, Mexico City and ended two-year later. The tour visited Europe, North America, South America and Central America, with Ha*Ash performing 131 shows through it.
1F Hecho Realidad Tour	April 25, 2015 – September 30, 2017	Primera Fila: Hecho Realidad	Americas & Europe	196	
The 1F Hecho Realidad Tour was Ha*Ash's fifth concert tour. It promoted their first live albums, Primera Fila: Hecho Realidad. The tour visited North America, Europe, South America and Central America, with Ha*Ash performing 196 shows through it. On November 26, 2016, they received the opportunity to play for the first time in the Palacio de los Deportes of Mexico City. The tour ended on September 30, 2017 at Guadalajara, Mexico.
Gira 100 años contigo	February 24, 2018 – February 14, 2020	30 de Febrero	Americas & Europe	112	
The Gira 100 años contigo was Ha*Ash's sixth concert tour. It promoted their fifth studio album 30 de Febrero. The tour was announced by Ha*Ash on their social media accounts in November 2017. The tour began on February 24, 2018 in Quinta Vergara, Viña del Mar, Chile. The tour visited North America, Europe, South America and Central America, with Ha*Ash performing 112 shows through it. An accompanying DVD was released in December 6, 2019, entitled Ha*Ash: En Vivo. The concert tour ended on February 14, 2020 at Zócalo, Mexico, with Ha*Ash performing 112 shows through it.

== Supporting tours ==
Title	Dates	Associated album(s)	Place	Shows	Ref.
The Sun Comes Out World Tour	April 2, 2011; April 5, 2011	She Wolf	Mexico	2	
The Sun Comes Out World Tour was Shakira's fifth concert tour. It promoted their eighth and ninth studio albums, She Wolf (2009) and Sale El Sol (2010). Ha*Ash performing 2 shows through it in Foro Sol and Estadio Tres de Marzo.
One World Tour	September 17, 2015 – October 4, 2015	A Quien Quiera Escuchar	United States	10	
The One World Tour was Ricky Martin's tenth concert tour. It promoted their tenth studio album A Quien Quiera Escuchar. Ha*Ash started touring as opening acts on Ricky Martin's One World Tour for some of his shows in the U.S., including state California, Arizona and Texas. Ha*Ash performing 10 shows through it.
Hecho en México Tour	October 1, 2021 - October 3, 2021	Hecho en México	United States	2	
The Hecho en México Tour was Alejandro Fernández's concert tour. It promoted their sixteenth studio album Hecho en México. Ha*Ash performing 2 shows through it in Hulu Theater Madison Square Garden in New York and AmericanAirlines Arena in Miami, Florida.

== Others concerts ==
Title	Dates	Associated album(s)	Place	Cities	Shows	Ref.
Ha*Ash en vivo (Note: The concerts was held with a minimal number of people due to the ongoing COVID-19.)	May 28, 2021 – May 29, 2021	30 de Febrero	Palco Tecate	Monterrey, Mexico	2	
Ha*Ash en vivo	July 2, 2021 – July 3, 2021 (Note: The show on July 3, 2021, also broadcast live via video streaming.)	30 de Febrero	Curva 4 – Autódromo Hnos. Rodríguez	Mexico City, Mexico	2	
Ha*Ash en vivo	July 16, 2021	30 de Febrero	Coliseo Centenario	Torreón, Mexico	1	
Ha*Ash en vivo	October 23, 2021	30 de Febrero	Audiorama El Trompo	Tijuana, Mexico	1	
Ha*Ash en vivo set list (Note: This is the setlist for the show at Palco Tecate in Monterrey, Mexico on May 28, 2021. It is not representative of every show on the concerts.): 1. "Estés Donde Estés" (Intro); 2. "¿De Dónde Sacas Eso?"; 3. "Amor a Medias"; 4. "Ojalá"; 5. "Sé Que Te Vas"; 6. "Todo No Fue Suficiente"; 7. "¿Qué Me Faltó?"; 8. "Destino o Casualidad"; 9. "Dos Copas de Más"; 10. "Eso No Va a Suceder"; 11. "¿Qué Hago Yo?"; 12. "No Pasa Nada"; 13. "Te Dejo en Libertad"; 14. "Ex de Verdad"; 15. "100 Años"; 16. "Lo Aprendí de Ti"; 17. "No Te Quiero Nada"; Encore: 19. "Perdón, Perdón"; 20. "30 de Febrero"

== Promotional tours ==
Title	Dates	Associated album(s)	Cities	Shows	Ref.
Reventour	September, 2008	Habitación Doble	Mexico City	Over 10 concerts	
Reventour set list: 1. "Hasta Que Llegaste Tú"; 2. "Amor a Medias"; 3. "Estés Donde Estés"; 4. Popurrí; 5. "Odio Amarte"; 6. "Superficial"; 7. "Te Quedaste"; 8. "Si Pruebas una Vez"; 9. "No Te Quiero Nada"; 10. "Me Entrego a Ti"; 11. "Soy Mujer"; 12. "¿Qué Hago Yo?"

== Charity showcase ==
Event	Date	Venue	City	Performed songs	Ref.
Together at Home (Note: This was broadcast online due to concerns over the COVID-19 pandemic.)	April 3, 2020	Virtual	Houston, Texas	"Te Dejo en Libertad" · "No Te Quiero Nada" · "Lo Aprendí de Ti" · "Eso No Va a Suceder" · "Perdón, Perdón"	

== Virtual showcase and concerts ==
Event	Date	Venue	City	Performed songs	Ref.
Live Citibanamex	April 23, 2020	Virtual showcase	Houston, Texas	"¿Qué Hago Yo?" · "Lo Aprendí de Ti" · "Perdón, Perdón" · "Estés Donde Estés"	
Live Citibanamex	August 28, 2020	Virtual showcase	Houston, Texas	"Dos Copas de Más" · "Estés Donde Estés" · "Ojalá" · "Sé Que Te Vas" · "¿Qué Hago Yo?" · "¿Qué Me Faltó?" · "Eso No Va a Suceder" · "Ex de Verdad" · "Lo Aprendí de Ti" · "Te Dejo en Libertad" · "No Te Quiero Nada" · "Perdón, Perdón"	
Ha*Ash en vivo	July 3, 2021	Curva 4 – Autódromo Hnos.	Mexico City, Mexico	"Estés Donde Estés" · "¿De Dónde Sacas Eso?" · "Amor a Medias" · "Ojalá" · "Sé Que Te Vas" · "Todo No Fue Suficiente" · "¿Qué Me Faltó?" · "Destino o Casualidad" · "Dos Copas de Más" · "Eso No Va a Suceder" · "¿Qué Hago Yo?" · "No Pasa Nada" · "Te Dejo en Libertad" · "Ex de Verdad" · "100 Años" · "Lo Aprendí de Ti" · "No Te Quiero Nada" · "Perdón, Perdón" · "30 de Febrero"	
Streaming Walmart (Note: Virtual concerts composed of Ha*Ash, Humbe, Matisse and Reik)	August 7, 2021	Streaming	Mexico City, Mexico	"Estés Donde Estés" · "Ojalá" · "Dos Copas de Más" · "¿Qué Hago Yo?" · "Te Dejo en Libertad" · "Lo Aprendí de Ti" · "No Te Quiero Nada" · "Perdón, Perdón"	

== Guest act ==
Title	Date	Notes	Ref.
Jalisco en Vivo 2009	June 27, 2009	Ha*Ash and Alejandro Fernández performed their "Sin Consideración" at Puerto Vallarta in Mexico City.	
Tour Primera fila	September 11, 2014	Ha*Ash and La Oreja de Van Gogh performed their "La Playa" at Auditorio Nacional in Mexico City.	
Gira Dentro	December 20, 2016	Ha*Ash and Maldita Nerea performed "Te Dejo en Libertad" at Barclay Card Center in Spain.	
Estamos Unidos Mexicanos	October 8, 2017	Ha*Ash and Carlos Rivera performed "Te Dejo en Libertad" at Zocalo in México.	
Viña del Mar International Song Festival	February 20, 2018	Ha*Ash and Miguel Bosé performed their "Si Tú No Vuelves" at Quinta Vergara, Viña del Mar in Chile	
Conexión Tour	December 7, 2019	Ha*Ash and María José performed their collaboration "Rosas en mi Almohada" at Auditorio Nacional in Mexico City.	
Los Ángeles Azules 40 Tour	September 5, 2021	Ha*Ash and Los Ángeles Azules performed their collaboration "Mi Niña Mujer" at Smart Financial Centre in Houston.	
Hecho en México 2021	September 24, 2021	Ha*Ash and Alejandro Fernández performed "Te Voy A Perder" at Smart Financial Centre in Houston.	
Hecho en México 2021	October 1, 2021	Ha*Ash and Alejandro Fernández performed "Te Voy A Perder" at Madison Square Garden in New York.	
Hecho en México 2021	October 3, 2021	Ha*Ash and Alejandro Fernández performed "Te Voy A Perder" at AmericanAirlines Arena in Miami, Florida.	
Amor y Patria US Tour 2023	October 6, 2023	Ha*Ash and Alejandro Fernández performed "Te Voy A Perder" at Toyota Center in Houston.	
Sanz en Vivo 2023	October 8, 2023	Ha*Ash and Alejandro Sanz performed "Looking for Paradise" at Smart Financial Centre in Houston.	
Sanz en Vivo 2023	October 12, 2023	Ha*Ash and Alejandro Sanz performed "Looking for Paradise" at El Paso County Coliseum in Houston.	
