= List of awards and nominations received by Ha*Ash =

Ha*Ash awards and nominations
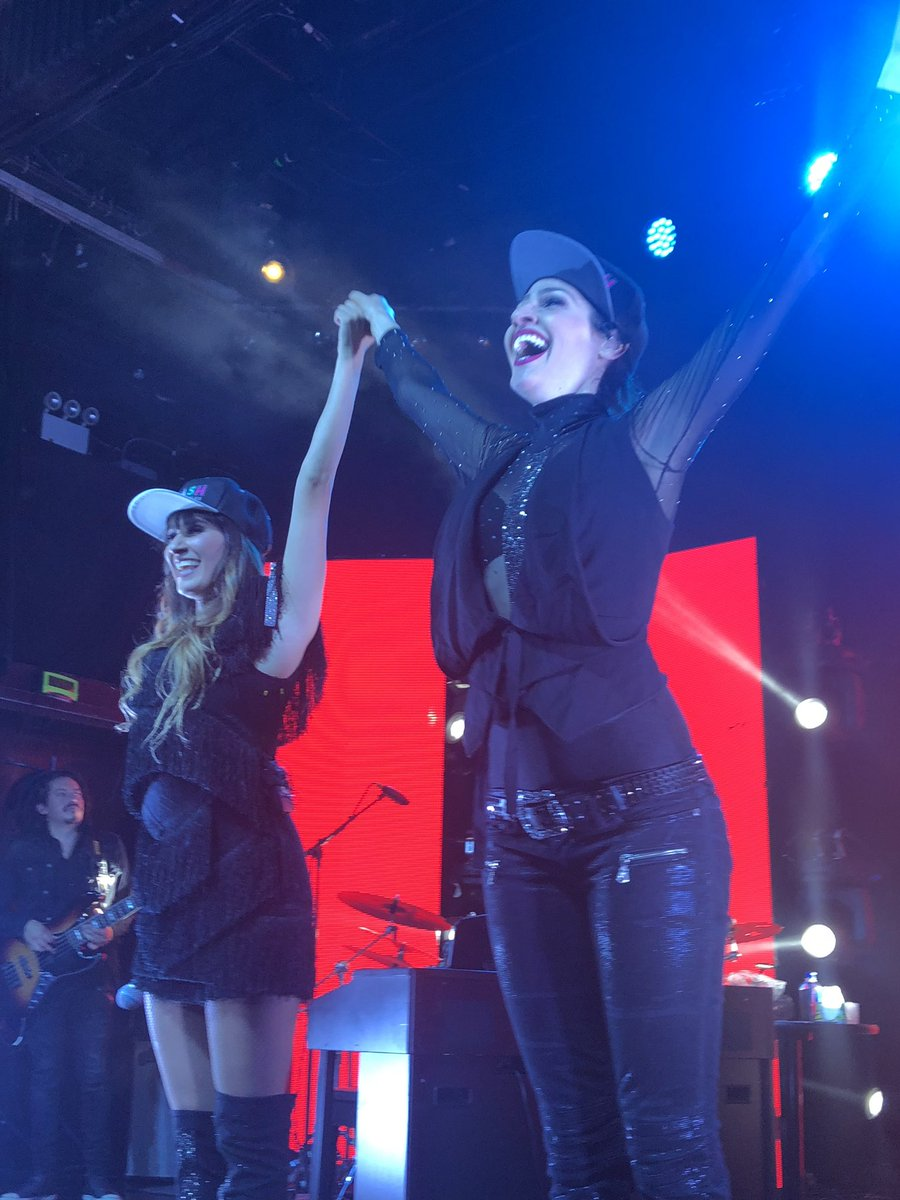
Awards and nominations
Award	Wins	Nominations
Academia Nacional de la Música	1	1
ASCAP	1	1
Billboard Latin Music Awards	0	2
Heat Latin Music Awards	1	1
Irresistible Awards Fanta	1	1
Lo Nuestro Awards	3	6
Lunas del auditorio	1	8
MTV Europe Music Awards	0	5
MTV Millennial Awards	1	2
Nickelodeon Mexico Kids' Choice Awards	0	3
Orgullosamente Latino Award	1	1
Premios Dial	1	1
Premios Juventud	3	3
Premios Oye!	2	3
Premios Quiero	2	6
SACM	4	4
Spotify Awards	1	1
Telehit Awards	2	2
Viña del Mar International Song Festival	3	3

Totals (Note: Certain award groups do not simply award one winner. They acknowledge several different recipients, have runners-up, and have third place. Since this is a specific recognition and is different from losing an award, runner-up mentions are considered wins in this award tally. For simplification and to avoid errors, each award in this list has been presumed to have had a prior nomination.)
- Wins: 29
- Nominations: 67

The list of awards and nominations received by the American Latin pop duo Ha*Ash consists of 29 awards and 53 nominations ranging from publications such as American Society of Composers, Authors and Publishers, Billboard Latin Music Awards, MTV Europe Music Awards, MTV Millennial Awards, Premios Juventud and Lo Nuestro Awards. The band was formed in 2002 by sisters Hanna Nicole and Ashley Grace. They have released five studio albums — Ha*Ash (2003), Mundos opuestos (2005), Habitación Doble (2008), A Tiempo (2011) and 30 de Febrero (2017) and two live albums — Primera Fila: Hecho Realidad (2014) and Ha*Ash: En Vivo (2019).

In December 2007, they joined charities in launching the Fondo Ha*Ash, which supports children suffering from HIV/AIDS and immigrants. Ha*Ash received the 2012 Pro Social Award and the 2016 Agentes de Cambio Award of the Kids Choice Awards Mexico, announced by Nickelodeon Latin America, for this social work.

== Academia Nacional de la Música ==
Academia Nacional de la Música en México (ANAMUSA).

Year	Nominee / work	Award	Result
2004	Ha*Ash	Young Artist of the Year	Won

== American Society of Composers, Authors and Publishers ==
The American Society of Composers, Authors and Publishers (ASCAP) presents a series of annual awards in seven different music categories: pop, rhythm and soul, film and television, Latin, country, Christian, and concert music.

Year	Nominee / work	Award	Result
2009	"No Te Quiero Nada"	Most Performed Pop/Ballad	Won

== Billboard Latin Music Awards ==
The Billboard Latin Music Awards are awarded annually by the Billboard magazine in the United States.

Year	Nominee / work	Award	Result
2009	"No Te Quiero Nada"	Favorite Song	Nominated
2016	Ha*Ash	Latin Pop Song Artist of the Year Duo or Group	Nominated

== Fans Choice Awards ==
The Fans Choice Awards were awarded annually in Mexico.

Year	Nominee / work	Award	Result
2015	Ha*Ash	Latin pop	Nominated
2016	Ha*Ash	Latin pop	Nominated
2018	Ha*Ash	Latin pop	Nominated
2021	Ha*Ash	Streaming concert - Artist female	Nominated
2021	Ha*Ash	Pop Duo	Won
2023	Ha*Ash	Artist female	Nominated
2023	HaÀsh	Artist Romantic Pop	Nominated
2023	"Mi Salida Contigo"	Featuring pop	Nominated

== Heat Latin Music Awards ==
The Heat Latin Music Awards is an annual awards show that airs on the HTV cable channel.

Year	Nominee / work	Award	Result
2016	Ha*Ash	Best Pop Group or Duo Rock	Won

== Irresistible Awards Fanta ==
The Irresistible Awards Fanta were awarded annually in Mexico.

Year	Nominee / work	Award	Result
2012	"Te Dejo En Libertad"	Irresistible Song	Won
2012	"Impermeable"	Irresistible Dance Song	Nominated
2012	Ha*Ash	Irresistible Artist	Nominated

== Lo Nuestro Awards ==
The Lo Nuestro Awards are awarded annually by the Univision television network in the United States.

Year	Nominee / work	Award	Result
2005	Ha*Ash	Best New Soloist or Grup of the Year	Won
2016	Ha*Ash	Pop Group or Duo of the Year	Nominated
2023	Ha*Ash	Pop Group or Duo of the Year	Nominated
2024	Ha*Ash	Pop Group or Duo of the Year	Pending
2024	Haashtag	Album of the Year	Pending
2024	Haashtag	Pop Album of the Year	Pending
2024	"Mi Salida Contigo"	Pop Song of the Year	Pending
2024	"Te Acuerdas"	Pop/Ballad Song of the Year	Pending

== Lunas del Auditorio ==
Lunas del Auditorio are sponsored by the National Auditorium in Mexico to honor the best live shows in the country.

Year	Nominee / work	Award	Result
2013	Ha*Ash	Pop in Spanish	Nominated
2015	Ha*Ash	Pop in Spanish	Nominated
2016	Ha*Ash	Pop in Spanish	Nominated
2017	Ha*Ash	Pop in Spanish	Nominated
2019	Ha*Ash	Pop in Spanish	Nominated

== MTV Awards ==
=== MTV Europe Music Awards ===
The MTV Europe Music Awards were established in 1994 by MTV Networks Europe to celebrate the most popular music videos in Europe.

Year	Nominee / work	Award	Result
2015	Ha*Ash	Best Latam North Act	Nominated
2018	Ha*Ash	Best Latam North Act	Won

=== MTV Millennial Awards ===
The MTV Millennial Awards is an annual program of Latin American music awards, presented by the cable channel MTV Latin America to honor the best of Latin music and the digital world of the millennial generation. The awards are the Latin version of the MTV Video Music Award.

Year	Nominee / work	Award	Result
2015	"Lo Aprendí de Ti"	Favorite Song	Nominated
2015	Ha*Ash	National Artist Year	Nominated
2016	"Perdón, Perdón"	Favorite Song	Nominated

== Nickelodeon Kids' Choice Awards México ==
The Nickelodeon Kids' Choice Awards is an annual awards show that airs on the Nickelodeon cable channel that honours the year's biggest television, film, and music acts, as voted by Nickelodeon viewers.

Year	Nominee / work	Award	Result
2011	Ha*Ash	Pop Group or Duo of the Year	Won
2012	Ha*Ash	Philanthropy (Save the children)	Won
2013	Ha*Ash	Pop Group or Duo of the Year	Nominated
2016	"Perdón, Perdón"	Favorite Song	Nominated
2016	Ha*Ash	Agents of Change (Foundation Ha*ash)	Won
2018	Ha*Ash	National Artist	Nominated

== Orgullosamente Latino Awards ==
The Orgullosamente Latino Awards are accolades awarded for the best in Latin music since 2004.

Year	Nominee / work	Award	Result
2004	Estés Donde Estés	Favorite Song	Won

== Premios 40 Principales ==
The Premios 40 Principales for Best Latin Artist was an honor presented annually at Los Premios 40 Principales, a ceremony that recognizes excellence in music, organised by Spain's top music radio Los 40 Principales.

Year	Nominee / work	Award	Result
2009	Ha*Ash	Best International Artist	Nominated

== Premios Dial ==
The Premios Dial is an annual awards show that airs on Cadena Dial.

Year	Nominee / work	Award	Result
2009	"No Te Quiero Nada"	The Best Spain 2009	Won

== Premios Juventud ==
The Premios Juventud are awarded annually by the Univision television network in the United States.

Year	Nominee / work	Award	Result
2006	"Tu Mirada en Mi"	Favorite Song	Nominated
2016	"Perdón, Perdón"	Favorite Song	Won
2023	Haashtag	Best Pop Album	Won
2023	"Supongo que Lo Sabes"	Pop Track Of The Year	Nominated
2023	Ha*Ash	Favorite Group or Duo of The Year	Won

== Premios Oye! ==
Premios Oye! are presented annually by the Academia Nacional de la Música en México for outstanding achievements in Mexican record industry.

Year	Nominee / work	Award	Result
2006	Ha*Ash	Pop Group or Duo of the Year	Won
2012	"Te Dejo En Libertad"	Favorite Song	Nominated
2012	Ha*Ash	Grupo Pop	Won

== Premios Quiero ==
The Premios Quiero is an annual awards show that airs on the "Quiero música en mi idioma" cable channel.

Year	Nominee / work	Award	Result
2015	"Perdón, Perdón"	Best Music Video	Won
2015	"Perdón, Perdón"	Video Of The Year	Nominated
2015	"Te Dejo En Libertad"	Best Music Video	Nominated
2016	"Sé Que Te Vas"	Best Music Video	Won
2018	"No Pasa Nada"	Best Music Video Woman	Nominated
2018	"No Pasa Nada"	Best Music Video	Nominated

== Society of Authors and Composers of Mexico ==
The Society of Authors and Composers of Mexico is a Mexican not-for-profit performance-rights organization.

Year	Nominee / work	Award	Result
2011	"Te Dejo En Libertad"	Success SACM	Won
2012	"¿De Dónde Sacas Eso?"	Success SACM	Won
2015	"Perdón, Perdón"	Success SACM	Won
2016	"Lo Aprendí de Ti"	Success SACM	Won

== Spotify Awards ==
Is an award show based entirely on user-generated data from our listeners in Mexico, with the promise of rewarding the most listened to by the public through this famous platform.

Year	Nominee / work	Award	Result
2020	Ha*Ash	Most popular pop artist	Won

== Telehit Awards ==
Telehit Awards is an annual award show run by the Mexican music channel Telehit.

Year	Nominee / work	Award	Result
2009	Ha*Ash	Young Artist of the Year	Won
2017	1F Hecho Realidad Tour	Tour of the Year	Won

== Viña del Mar International Song Festival ==
The Viña del Mar International Song Festival is a music festival that has been held annually during the 3rd week of February in Viña del Mar, Chile.

Year	Nominee / work	Award	Result
2018	Ashley Grace	Popular Queen	Won
2018	Ha*Ash	Gaviota de Plata	Won
2018	Ha*Ash	Gaviota de Oro	Won

== See also ==
- Ha*Ash discography
- List of songs recorded by Ha*Ash
