= 1F Hecho Realidad Tour =

2015–17 concert tour by Ha*Ash

- World tour by Ha*Ash
- Promotional poster for the tour
- Associated album: Primera Fila: Hecho Realidad
- Start date: 25 April 2015
- End date: 30 September 2017
- Legs: 2
- No. of shows: 164 in North America; 3 in Europe; 25 in South America; 4 in Central America; 196 in total

Ha*Ash concert chronology
- A Tiempo Tour (2012–13); 1F Hecho Realidad Tour (2015–17); Gira 100 años contigo (2018–22)

1F Hecho Realidad Tour was the fifth concert tour by American group Ha*Ash in support of the act's first live album, Primera Fila: Hecho Realidad (2014). The tour visited South America, North America and Europe starting on April 25, 2015.

== Opening acts ==
- José Cantoral
- Mando
- María José Castillo

== Special guests ==
- Axel – April 3, 2015 and November 12, 2015: "No Te Quiero Nada"
- Moderrato – June 21, 2015: "Ya Lo Veía Venir"
- Matisse – June 21, 2015 and November 26, 2016: "Sé Que Te Vas"
- Joy Huerta – October 25, 2015: "Qué Más Da" and "No Tiene Devolución"
- Reik – November 26, 2016: "Creo en Ti" and "¿Qué Haré Con Este Amor?"
- Alicia Villarreal – November 26, 2016: "Te Aprovechas", "Ex de Verdad" and "Ay Papacito"

== Set list ==
This is the setlist for the show at the Auditorio Telmex in Guadalajara, México on September 10, 2016. It is not representative of every show on the tour.

1. Soy Mujer
2. Amor a Medias
3. ¿De Dónde Sacas Eso?
4. Dos Copas de Más
5. Todo No Fue Suficiente
6. Me Entrego a Ti
7. Lo Aprendí de Ti
8. ¿Qué Haré Con Este Amor?
9. Te Quedaste
10. Si Pruebas una Vez
11. Tú y Yo Volvemos al Amor (Mónica Naranjo cover)
12. Ex de Verdad
13. ¿Qué Hago Yo?
14. Impermeable
15. Sé Que Te Vas
16. Te Dejo en Libertad
17. No Te Quiero Nada
  Encore 1
18. Odio Amarte
  Encore 2
19. Perdón, Perdón
20. Estés Donde Estés

== Tour dates ==
List of concerts, showing date, city, country.
Date	City	Country	Venue
North America
25 April 2015	Ciudad de México	Mexico	Auditorio Nacional
29 April 2015	Aguas calientes	Mexico	Feria Nacional de San Marcos
30 April 2015	Querétaro	Mexico	Auditorio Josefa Dominguez
4 May 2015	Villahermosa	Mexico	Feria Tabasco
6 May 2015	Hermosillo	Mexico	Palenque Hermosillo
7 May 2015	Metepec	Mexico	Palenque Metepec
8 May 2015	Torreón	Mexico	Expo Center
14 May 2015	Hidalgo	Mexico	Show Mineral de la Reforma
15 May 2015	San Luis Potosí	Mexico	Plaza de Toros
16 May 2015	Monterrey	Mexico	Domo Monterrey
22 May 2015	Tequisquiapan	Mexico	Parque de la Pila
29 May 2015	Tijuana	Mexico	El foro
30 May 2015	Mexicali	Mexico	Centro cívico
2 June 2015	Monterrey	Mexico	Arena Monterrey
18 June 2015	Ciudad de México	Mexico	Centro Cultural Roberto Cantoral
23 June 2015	Morelia	Mexico	Palacio del Arte
21 June 2015	Ciudad de México	Mexico	Auditorio Nacional
10 July 2016	Morelia	Mexico	Palacio del arte
18 July 2015	Guadalajara	Mexico	Teatro Diana
19 July 2015	Guadalajara	Mexico	Teatro Diana
24 July 2015	Mérida	Mexico	Plaza de toros
2 August 2015	Tulancingo	Mexico	Palenque de Tulancingo
4 August 2015	Durango	Mexico	Velaria de la Feria
7 August 2015	Fresnillo	Mexico	Palenque Fresnillo
8 August 2015	Zacatlan	Mexico	Palenque Zacatlan
28 August 2015	San Luis Potosí	Mexico	Feria San Luis
29 August 2015	Cancún	Mexico	Plaza de Toros
4 September 2015	Tijuana	Mexico	Palenque de Tijuana
5 September 2015	Hidalgo	Mexico	Dolores Hidalgo
10 September 2015	Zacatecas	Mexico	Palenque de la FENAZA
12 September 2015	Acapulco	Mexico	Forum Mundo Imperial
13 September 2015	Nvo Laredo	Mexico	Palenque Nvo Laredo
15 September 2015	Oakland	United States	Oracle Arena
17 September 2015	Las Vegas	United States	The Axis at Planet
19 September 2015	Inglewood	United States	The forum
20 September 2015	San Diego	United States	Viejas Arenas
26 September 2015	Phoenix	United States	Comerica Theatre
27 September 2015	El Paso	United States	El Paso County
29 September 2015	Hidalgo	United States	State Farm Arena
30 September 2015	Houston	United States	Toyota Center
1 October 2015	Laredo	United States	Laredo Energy Arena
3 October 2015	San Antonio	United States	Freeman Coliseum
4 October 2015	Dallas	United States	Gexa Energy Pavilion
9 October 2015	Cuernavaca	Mexico	Beraka AdventurePark
10 October 2015	Monterrey	Mexico	Auditorio Citibanamex
17 October 2015	CD. Juárez	Mexico	Palenque de la Feria de Cd. Juarez
21 October 2015	Pachuca	Mexico	Teatro del Pueblo
22 October 2015	Cd Victoria	Mexico	Palenque de victoria
25 October 2015	Ciudad de México	Mexico	Auditorio Nacional
27 October 2015	Guadalajara	Mexico	Auditorio Benito Juarez
Latin America
1 November 2015	Buenos aires	Argentina	Teatro Opera
2 November 2015	Buenos aires	Argentina	Teatro Opera
3 November 2015	Rosario	Argentina	Teatro El Círculo
4 November 2015	Córdoba	Argentina	Quality Espacio
5 November 2015	Córdoba	Argentina	Quality Espacio
North America
7 November 2015	Michoacán	Mexico	Cd. Hidalgo
9 November 2015	Ciudad de México	Mexico	Acoustic Box
14 November 2015	Cd.Obregón	Mexico	Expo Obregón
17 November 2015	Culiacán	Mexico	Palenque de Culiacán
Latin America
25 November 2015	Bogotá	Colombia	Vibra al natural
North America
27 November 2015	León	Mexico	Domo de la feria
28 November 2015	Ensenada	Mexico	Pueblo Antiguo Ensenada
29 November 2015	Mexicali	Mexico	Palenque del fex
1 December 2015	Taxco	Mexico	Taxco de Alarcón
2 December 2015	Monterrey	Mexico	Auditorio Citibanamex
3 December 2015	Hermosillo	Mexico	Palenque Hermosillo
6 December 2015	Chiapas	Mexico	Tuxtla Gutiérrez
10 December 2015	Puebla	Mexico	Auditorio Metropolitano
11 December 2015	Chihuahua	Mexico	Expo Chihuahua
2 January 2016	Acapulco	Mexico	Forum Mundo Imperial
29 January 2016	Aguascalientes	Mexico	Palenque de la feria
6 February 2016	La Paz, BCS	Mexico	Explanada del Malecón
8 February 2016	Mazatlan	Mexico	Estadio Teodoro Mariscal
14 February 2016	Zitacuaro	Mexico	Palenque de Zitacuaro
20 February 2016	Ciudad de México	Mexico	Auditorio Nacional
26 February 2016	Guadalajara	Mexico	Auditorio Telmex
27 February 2016	Monterrey	Mexico	Auditorio Citibanamex
11 March 2016	Guadalajara	Mexico	Auditorio Telmex
12 March 2016	Monterrey	Mexico	Auditorio Citibanamex
19 March 2016	Veracruz	Mexico	Auditorio Benito Juarez
31 March 2016	Cuernavaca	Mexico	Palenque Cuernavaca
1 April 2016	Xalapa	Mexico	Velódromo Internacional
2 April 2016	Querétaro	Mexico	Auditorio Josefa Ortiz
13 April 2016	Mc Allen	United States	McAllen Convention Center
14 April 2016	Laredo	United States	Laredo Energy Arena
15 April 2016	McAllen	United States	Mc Allen Convention Center
16 April 2016	San Antonio	United States	The Aztec Theatre
17 April 2016	El Paso	United States	Southwest University Events Center
19 April 2016	Anaheim	United States	House of Blues
21 April 2016	Tempe	United States	Marquee Theatre
24 April 2016	Tijuana	Mexico	Audiorama Museo
3 May 2016	Aguas Calientes	Mexico	Palenque de la Feria de San Marcos
6 May 2016	Metepec	Mexico	Palenque de Metepec
7 May 2016	Colima	Mexico	Palenque Colima
Latin America
10 May 2016	Comodoro	Argentina	Teatro Maria Auxiliadora
12 May 2016	Junín	Argentina	Sociedad Rural
13 May 2016	Buenos aires	Argentina	Luna Park
14 May 2016	Mendoza	Argentina	Auditorio Ángel Bustelo
15 May 2016	Santiago	Chile	Movistar Arena
North America
18 May 2016	Hermosillo	Mexico	Palenque de hermosillo
19 May 2016	Chihuahua	Mexico	Sta. Rita
21 May 2016	Torreón	Mexico	Explanada de la feria
22 May 2016	Saltillo	Mexico	Auditorio Las Maravillas
Latin America
28 May 2016	Lima	Peru	Explanada Sur del Estadio
North America
3 June 2016	Miami	United States	Filmore Miami Beach
4 June 2016	San Juan	Puerto Rico	Centro Bellas Artes
5 June 2016	San Juan	Puerto Rico	Centro Bellas Artes
9 June 2016	Ciudad de México	Mexico	Auditorio Nacional
10 June 2016	Mexicali	Mexico	Palenque de Fex
16 June 2016	Cancún	Mexico	Plaza de toros
18 June 2016	Mérida	Mexico	Coliseo de Merida
23 June 2016	Irapuato	Mexico	Palenque del Inforum
26 June 2016	Zacatecas	Mexico	Palenque Zacatecas
29 June 2016	Tlaxcala	Mexico	Palenque Feria Tlaxcala
2 July 2016	Tuxtla Gtz	Mexico	Poliforum
9 July 2016	San Buenaventura	Mexico	Feria San Buena
16 July 2016	Durango	Mexico	Velaria de la Feria
23 July 2016	Santo Domingo	Dominican Republic	Anfiteatro Nurín
4 August 2016	Nueva Rosita	Mexico	Nueva Rosita
6 August 2016	Ensenada	Mexico	Viña de Liceaga
31 August 2016	Tijuana	Mexico	Palenque del Parque
4 September 2016	Zacatecas	Mexico	Show Fresnillo
10 September 2016	Guadalajara	Mexico	Auditorio Telmex
Latin America
16 September 2016	Portoviejo	Ecuador	Centro de Eventos La Esperanza
17 September 2016	Guayaquil	Ecuador	Centro de Convenciones
22 September 2016	El Salvador	El salvador	Anfiteatro Internacional
24 September 2016	Guatemala	Guatemala	Fórum Majadas
25 September 2016	San José	Costa Rica	Parque Viva
North America
7 October 2016	Tampico	Mexico	Expo Tampico
13 October 2016	Mexicali	Mexico	Centro de Ferias
15 October 2016	Villahermosa	Mexico	Palenque de Gallos
16 October 2016	Pachuca	Mexico	Palenque de Pachuca
20 October 2016	Tepic	Mexico	Auditorio de la gente
22 October 2016	Hermosillo	Mexico	Expogan Palenque
26 October 2016	Morelos	Mexico	Unidad Deportiva Fidel
Latin America
29 October 2016	Lima	Peru	Anfiteatro de la exposición
3 November 2016	Rosario	Argentina	Teatro El Círculo
4 November 2016	Córdoba	Argentina	Orfeo superdomo
6 November 2016	Corrientes	Argentina	Club Regatas
9 November 2016	Montevideo	Uruguay	Teatro de Verano
11 November 2016	Buenos Aires	Argentina	Luna Park
12 November 2016	San Juan	Argentina	Teatro del Bicentenario
13 November 2016	Santiago	Chile	Teatro Caupolicán
North America
17 November 2016	Toluca	Mexico	Teatro Morelos
18 November 2016	Aguascalientes	Mexico	Palenque Aguas Calientes
20 November 2016	Culiacán	Mexico	Palenque de Culiacán
24 November 2016	Morelia	Mexico	Palacio del Arte
26 November 2016	Ciudad de México	Mexico	Palacio de los Deportes
27 November 2016	Mérida	Mexico	Palenque de la feria
2 December 2016	Monterrey	Mexico	Auditorio Citibanamex
4 December 2016	San Juan	Puerto Rico	Coliseo José Miguel Agrelot
North America
9 December 2016	San Luis Potosí	Mexico	El Domo
15 December 2016	Puebla	Mexico	Auditorio de la BUAP
16 December 2016	Tuxtla. Chiapas	Mexico	Palenque Chiapas
17 December 2016	Cd. del Carmen	Mexico	Domo del Mar
6 January 2017	Acapulco	Mexico	Forum Mundo Imperial
18 January 2017	León	Mexico	Feria de León
30 January 2017	CD Carmen	Mexico	Domo del Mar
3 February 2017	Oaxaca	Mexico	Auditorio Guelaguetza
Europe
17 February 2017	Barcelona	Spain	Bikini
19 February 2017	Madrid	Spain	Joy Eslava
North America
28 de Ferrero de 2017	Veracruz	Mexico	Macroplaza del Malecón
25 March 2017	Monterrey	Mexico	Auditorio Citibanamex
14 April 2017	Coatzacoalcos	Mexico	Expo Coatza
28 April 2017	Chihuahua	Mexico	Estadio Almanza
29 April 2017	Ciudad Juárez	Mexico	Estadio Carta Blanca
30 April 2017	Morelia	Mexico	Recinto Ferial Morelia
2 May 2017	Hermosillo	Mexico	ExpoGan Palenque
5 May 2017	Aguas calientes	Mexico	Foro de las Estrellas
12 May 2017	Culiacán	Mexico	Feria Culiacán
15 May 2017	Monterrey	Mexico	Domo care
20 May 2017	Mérida	Mexico	Coliseo Tucatán
27 May 2017	Ciudad Obregón	Mexico	Show Cd Obregon
3 June 2017	Puerto Vallarta	Mexico	Centro internacional de Convenciones
Latin America
30 June 2017	Santiago	Chile	Movistar Arena
1 July 2017	Buenos aires	Argentina	Luna Park
North America
4 August 2017	Tulancingo	Mexico	Palenque Tulancingo
11 August 2017	Denver, CO	United States	National Western Complex
20 August 2017	Costa Mesa, CA	United States	Pacific Amphitheater
2 September 2017	Mexicali	Mexico	Ciudad deportiva
13 September 2017	Tijuana	Mexico	Palenque del Parque Morelos
30 September 2017	Guadalajara	Mexico	Palenque de Guadalajara
