= Dos Copas de Más =

Single by Ha*Ash

from the album Primera Fila: Hecho Realidad
- Language: Spanish
- English title: "Two Cups Of More"
- Released: 11 December 2015
- Recorded: 7 July 2014 in Mexico City, México
- Genre: Acoustic Music; country
- Length: 3:42
- Label: Sony Music Latin
- Songwriters: Ashley Grace Pérez; Hanna Nicole Pérez; Pablo Preciado
- Producers: George Noriega; Tim Mitchell

Ha*Ash singles chronology
"No Te Quiero Nada" (2015)	"Dos Copas de Más" (2015)	"Sé Que Te Vas" (2016)

Music video
- "Dos Copas de Más" on YouTube

"Dos Copas de Más" (transl. "Two Cups Of More") is a song written and recorded by the American musical duo Ha*Ash. Is the fifth single of the live album Primera Fila: Hecho Realidad by American duo Ha*Ash. The single was officially released on December 11, 2015. The music video of the song is the live performance by Ha*Ash in Estudios Churubusco (Mexico City) on 7 July 2014. The song then included on their live album Ha*Ash: En Vivo (2019). It was written by Ashley Grace, Hanna Nicole and Pablo Preciado.

== Background and release ==
"Dos Copas de Más" was written by Ashley Grace, Hanna Nicole and Pablo Preciado and produced by George Noriega, Tim Mitchell and Pablo De La Loza. Is a song recorded by American duo Ha*Ash from her live album Primera Fila: Hecho Realidad. It was released as the fifth single from the album on December 11, 2015, by Sony Music Entertainment.

== Music video ==
A music video for "Dos Copas de Más" was released on March 27, 2015. It was directed by Nahuel Lerena. The video was filmed in Estudios Churubusco, City Mexico. As of October 2019, the video has over 83 million views on YouTube.

The second video for "Dos Copas de Más", recorded live for the live album Ha*Ash: En Vivo, was released on December 6, 2019. The video was filmed in Auditorio Nacional, Mexico City.

== Commercial performance ==
In Mexico, the song peaked at number three on the Mexican Singles Chart, and Monitor Latino. In 2017, the song was certified Gold in México. In March 2019, the songs was certified as Platinum in Mexico.

== Credits and personnel ==
Credits adapted from AllMusic.

Recording and management

- Recording Country: México
- Sony / ATV Discos Music Publishing LLC / Westwood Publishing
- (P) 2014 Sony Music Entertainment México, S.A. De C.V.

Ha*Ash

- Ashley Grace – vocals, guitar, songwriting
- Hanna Nicole – vocals, guitar, piano, songwriting

Additional personnel

- Ben Peeler – Guitarra Lap Steel
- Pablo De La Loza – co-production
- Paul Forat – A&R. programming, production
- Ezequiel Ghilardi – bass
- Pablo Preciado – songwriting
- George Noriega – producer
- Tim Mitchell – producer

== Charts ==
Chart	Position
Mexico (Monitor Latino)	3
Mexico (Billboard Mexican Airplay)	16
Mexico (Billboard Espanol Airplay )	3

=== Year-end charts ===
Year-end chart performance for "Dos Copas de Más"
Chart (2016)	Position
Mexico (Monitor Latino)	31

== Certifications ==
Region	Certification	Certified units/sales
Mexico (AMPROFON)	Platinum	60,000^{‡}
^{‡} Sales+streaming figures based on certification alone.

== Release history ==
Region	Date	Edition(s)	Format	Label	Ref.
Various	December 11, 2015	Standard	Digital download; streaming	Sony Music Latin	
Various	December 6, 2019	Live Version	Digital download; streaming	Sony Music Latin	
