= Qué Más Da =

Qué Más Da may refer to:

- "Qué Más Da", a song by Ha*Ash from their live album Primera Fila: Hecho Realidad
- "Qué Más Da", the Spanish-language version of "I Don't Care" (Ricky Martin song)
