= Ex de Verdad =

Single by Ha*Ash

from the album Primera Fila: Hecho Realidad
- Language: Spanish
- English title: "True Ex"
- Released: 25 May 2015
- Recorded: 7 July 2014 in Mexico City, México
- Genre: Acoustic Music; country; power ballad
- Length: 4:07
- Label: Sony Music Latin
- Songwriters: Ashley Grace Pérez; Hanna Nicole Pérez; Beatriz Luengo; Antonio Rayo
- Producers: George Noriega; Tim Mitchell

Ha*Ash singles chronology
"Lo Aprendí de Ti" (2015)	"Ex de Verdad" (2015)	"No Te Quiero Nada" (2015)

Music video
- "Ex de Verdad" on YouTube

"Ex de Verdad" (transl. "True Ex") is a song written and recorded by the American musical duo Ha*Ash. Is the third single of the live album Primera Fila: Hecho Realidad. The single was officially released on May 25, 2015. The music video of the song is the live performance by Ha*Ash in Estudios Churubusco (City México) on 7 July 2014. The song then included on their live album Ha*Ash: En Vivo (2019). It was written by Ashley Grace, Hanna Nicole and Beatriz Luengo.

== Background and release ==
"Ex de Verdad" was written by Ashley Grace, Hanna Nicole and Beatriz Luengo and produced by George Noriega, Tim Mitchell and Pablo De La Loza. Is a song recorded by American duo Ha*Ash from her live album Primera Fila: Hecho Realidad. It was released as the third single from the album on May 25, 2015, by Sony Music Entertainment.

== Music video ==
A music video for "Ex de Verdad" was released on May 25, 2015. It was directed by Nahuel Lerena. The video was filmed in Estudios Churubusco, City Mexico. As of June 2023, the video has over 377 million views on YouTube.

The second video for "Ex de Verdad", recorded live for the live album Ha*Ash: En Vivo, was released on December 6, 2019. The video was filmed in Auditorio Nacional, Mexico City.

== Commercial performance ==
The track peaked at number one on the Monitor Latino and at number 33 in the Mexico Espanol Airplay charts in México. In March 2019, the songs was certified as Double Platinum in Mexico.

== Credits and personnel ==
Credits adapted from AllMusic.

Recording and management

- Recording Country: México
- Sony / ATV Discos Music Publishing LLC / Westwood Publishing
- (P) 2014 Sony Music Entertainment México, S.A. De C.V.

Ha*Ash

- Ashley Grace – vocals, guitar, songwriting
- Hanna Nicole – vocals, guitar, piano, songwriting

Additional personnel

- Beatriz Luengo – songwriting
- Antonio Rayo – songwriting
- Pablo De La Loza – co-producer, co-director
- George Noriega – producer
- Tim Mitchell – producer
- Roberto Collío – engineer
- Jules Ramllano – engineer

== Charts ==
Chart	Position
Mexico (Monitor Latino)	1
Mexico (Billboard Espanol Airplay)	33
Mexico (Monitor Latino - Top 100)	29

== Certifications ==
Region	Certification	Certified units/sales
Mexico (AMPROFON)	Diamond+Gold	330,000^{‡}
^{‡} Sales+streaming figures based on certification alone.

== Awards and nominations ==
Year	Awards ceremony	Award	Results
2017	VEVO Certified	100,000,000 views	Won

== Release history ==
Region	Date	Edition(s)	Format	Label	Ref.
Various	May 25, 2015	Standard	Digital download; streaming	Sony Music Latin	
Various	November 13, 2015	Big Band Remix	Digital download; streaming	Sony Music Latin	
Various	December 6, 2019	Live Version	Digital download; streaming	Sony Music Latin	
