= Primera Fila: Hecho Realidad =

2014 live album by Ha*Ash

Primera Fila:Hecho Realidad

Live album and video by Ha*Ash
- Released: 11 November 2014
- Recorded: 7 July 2014
- Venues: Estudios Churubusco, Mexico; Lake Charles, Louisiana
- Genres: Acoustic music; country pop; latin pop; power ballad
- Length: 53:45
- Language: Spanish
- Label: Sony Music Latin
- Producers: George Noriega; Tim Mitchell; Pablo De La Loza (co.)

Ha*Ash chronology
A Tiempo (2011)	Primera Fila:Hecho Realidad (2014)	30 de Febrero (2017)

Ha*Ash live albums chronology
Primera Fila: Hecho Realidad (2014)	Ha*Ash: En Vivo (2019)

Special Edition cover
- Mexican Edition CD cover

Singles from Primera Fila: Hecho Realidad
- 1. "Perdón, Perdón" Released: 22 September 2014; 2. "Lo Aprendí de Ti" Released: 6 March 2015; 3. "Ex de Verdad" Released: 25 May 2015; 4. "No Te Quiero Nada" Released: 30 September 2015; 5. "Dos Copas de Más" Released: 11 December 2015; 6. "Sé Que Te Vas" Released: 26 April 2016

Primera Fila:Hecho Realidad (transl. "First Row: Reality") is the first live album by American Latin pop duo Ha*Ash. It was released under the label Sony Music Latin on 11 November 2014. The album was recorded in Lake Charles, Louisiana and Ciudad de México on 7 July 2014, with a selected audience to attend the concert.

The album includes material from her past four studio albums as well as 8 newly recorded songs. The album features collaborations by several performers, including Julio Ramírez, Maluma, Joy Huerta, Matisse, and Axel, among others. Ha*Ash worked with producers George Noriega, Pablo De La Loza, and Tim Mitchell. Six singles were released from Primera Fila: Hecho Realidad worldwide. "Perdón, Perdón" was released as the lead single in September 2014. The other songs released were "Lo Aprendí de Ti", "Ex de Verdad", "No Te Quiero Nada", "Dos Copas de Más", and "Sé Que Te Vas".

== Background and production ==
The album includes material from her past five studio albums as well as 8 newly recorded songs. This production includes hits and new tracks featuring Maluma, Joy Huerta, Julio Ramirez (Reik), Axel, Matisse, and a gospel choir. The album was recorded in front of a selected audience to attend the concert located in Mexico City. The CD/DVD has images from their hometown in Lake Charles, Louisiana and a live concert filmed in Estudios Churubusco. Ha*Ash worked with producers George Noriega, Pablo De La Loza, and Tim Mitchell.

=== Album concept ===
Primera Fila is a "concept" strategy created by Sony Music Latin and initially aiming to present some of the top Latin artists while directly recording their music material before a small number of attendants. This "unplugged" format that would present artists in their most intimate and personal performance was the main concept of Primera Fila. Ha*Ash is the youngest group to record a Primera Fila concept album.

== Release and promotion ==
In the United States and Mexico, the standard edition of the album was released exclusively on 11 November 2014. The Blu-ray edition was released in November 2014. The Mexican deluxe edition of Primera Fila: Hecho realidad includes the concert DVD, a live audio CD was made available on 13 November 2015. The DVD and Blu-ray editions feature the entire concert, as well as over an exclusive documentary, while the two CDs include the audio from the main performances. In Europe and Latin America the deluxe edition of Primera Fila: Hecho realidad was released on 4 March 2016.

=== Singles ===
Six singles have been released in support of the parent album. "Perdón, Perdón", was released on 22 September 2014 as the lead single. The track peaked at number 17 in the Latin Pop Songs, number 36 in the Hot Latin songs and at number 35 in the Latin Airplay charts in the United States. In Mexico, the song peaked at number one on the Mexican Singles Chart, and Monitor Latino. The second single, "Lo Aprendí de Ti" was released on 6 March 2015. The track peaked at number one on the Mexican Singles Chart and Monitor Latino. In the United States the song peaked at number 19 in the Latin Pop Songs, number 32 in the Hot Latin songs and at number 59 in the Latin Airplay.

The other songs released were "Ex de Verdad". The track peaked at number one on the Monitor Latino on México. "No Te Quiero Nada" (with Axel) which was previously released as a single from her third album Habitación Doble, was re-released as the album's second digital single on 30 September 2015. The track peaked at number one on the Monitor Latino on México. The music video of the song is the live performance by Ha*Ash in Lake Charles, Louisiana.

"Dos Copas de Más", was released as the album's fifth single on 4 November 2015; The track peaked at number 49 in the Latin Pop Songs In Mexico, the song peaked at number three on the Mexican Singles Chart, and Monitor Latino. On 26 January April 2016, the track "Sé Que Te Vas", launched in was released as the album's six single and was accompanied by a music video. The track peaked at number 28 in the Mexico Espanol Airplay and at number 16 in the Monitor Latino on México.

=== Tour ===
To promote the album, Ha*Ash embarked on a world concert tour during 2015 and 2017. The "1F Hecho Realidad Tour" is a concert tour performed by Ha*Ash visited North America, Europe and Latin America. The 196-show tour began in the National Auditorium of Mexico City on 25 April 2015 and ended two year later.

== Commercial performance ==
The album achieved immense success in Mexico, debuting a top of the country's both physical and digital album charts. In the United States, it peak at number 16 in Latin Pop album charts, published by Billboard. Primera Fila: Hecho Realidad was certified gold one week after its release in Mexico for shipments of over 30,000 copies, according to the AMPROFON. The same month was certified as Platinum, subsequently as Double Platinum, then as Double Platinum and Gold for exceeding sales of 150,000 sold copies in 2016.

By the end of 2016, Sony Music informed that the album had been certified as gold in Argentina and platinum in Colombia. In the territory of Central America the album achieved platinum certification by the end of 2017 for sales over 20,000 copies. In 2018, the album was certified as Quadruple Platinum in Mexico. In June 2018, it had already been certified as double platinum in Peru for sales exceeding 40,000 copies. In December 2018, it was announced by AMPROFON that the album had achieved a quadruple platinum and gold certification, which equals 270,000 copies sold. As of November 2018, Primera Fila: Hecho Realidad had sold near 600,000 copies worldwide. On September 23, the album was certified as Diamond and gold.

== Track listing ==
Standard edition
No.	Title	Writer(s)	Producer(s)	Length
1.	"Soy Mujer"	Áureo Baqueiro	Tim Mitchell; George Noriega; Pablo De La Loza^{[a]}	4:19
2.	"Estés Donde Estés"	Baqueiro; Salvador Rizo	Mitchell; Noriega; De La Loza^{[a]}	4:06
3.	"Te Dejo en Libertad"	Ashley Grace; Hanna Nicole; José Luis Ortega	Mitchell; Noriega; De La Loza^{[a]}	4:02
4.	"Perdón, Perdón"	Ashley; Hanna; Ortega	Mitchell; Noriega; De La Loza^{[a]}	3:46
5.	"Dos Copas de Más"	Ashley; Hanna; Pablo Preciado	Mitchell; Noriega; De La Loza^{[a]}	3:42
6.	"¿Qué Hago Yo?"	Soraya	Mitchell; Noriega; De La Loza^{[a]}	3:32
7.	"No Tiene Devolución"	Ashley; Hanna; Joy Huerta; Julio Ramírez	Mitchell; Noriega; De La Loza^{[a]}	3:33
8.	"Qué Más Da" (feat. Joy Huerta & Julio Ramírez)	Ashley; Hanna; Huerta; Ramírez; Noriega; Carla García	Mitchell; Noriega; De La Loza^{[a]}	3:20
9.	"Ex de Verdad"	Ashley; Hanna; Antonio Rayo; Beatriz Luengo	Mitchell; Noriega; De La Loza^{[a]}	4:07
10.	"No Te Quiero Nada" (feat. Axel)	Baqueiro	Mitchell; Noriega; De La Loza^{[a]}	3:58
11.	"Sé Que Te Vas" (feat. Matisse)	Ashley; Hanna; Preciado	Mitchell; Noriega; De La Loza^{[a]}	4:03
12.	"Lo Aprendí de Ti"	Ashley; Hanna; Ortega	Mitchell; Noriega; De La Loza^{[a]}	3:17
13.	"Odio Amarte"	Ashley; Hanna; Baqueiro	Mitchell; Noriega; De La Loza^{[a]}	4:18
14.	"His Eyes On the Sparrow"	Civilla D. Martin; Charles H. Gabriel	Mitchell; Noriega; De La Loza^{[a]}	3:46
Total length:				53:45

Mexican Deluxe Edition (CD)
No.	Title	Writer(s)	Producer(s)	Length
15.	"Quédate Lejos" (feat. Maluma)	Ashley; Hanna; Preciado	Jules Ramllano	3:55
16.	"No Soy Yo"	Ashley; Hanna; Leonel García	Jules Ramllano	3:44
17.	"Pedazos"	Soraya	Ramllano	4:02
18.	"Te Quedaste" (acoustic)	Baqueiro; García	Ramllano	4:06
19.	"¿Qué Haré Con Este Amor?" (acoustic)	Alejandra Alberti; Ignacio Morales	Ramllanoa	3:28
20.	"Si Pruebas una Vez" (acoustic)	Juan Luis Broissin; Ángela Dávalos	Mitchell; Noriega; De La Loza^{[a]}	3:13
21.	"Ex de Verdad" (Big Band)	Ashley; Hanna; Rayo; Luengo	Rodolgo Vázquez	3:58
22.	"Perdón, Perdón" (Big Band)	Ashley; Hanna; Ortega	Vázquez	4:04
23.	"At Last" (Big Band)	Mack Gordon; Harry Warren	Vázquez	3:08

Mexican Deluxe Edition (DVD)
No.	Title	Length
1.	"Soy Mujer [live]" (Video)
2.	"Estés Donde Estés [live]" (Video)
3.	"Te Dejo en Libertad [live]" (Video)
4.	"Perdón, Perdón [live]" (Video)
5.	"¿Qué Hago Yo? [live]" (Video)
6.	"No Tiene Devolución [live]" (Video)
7.	"Ex de Verdad [live]" (Video)
8.	"Dos Copas de Más [live]" (Video)
9.	"Lo Aprendí de Ti [live]" (Video)
10.	"Sé Que Te Vas [live]" (feat. Matisse Video)
11.	"Odio Amarte [live]" (Video)
12.	"No Te Quiero Nada [live]" (feat. Axel Video)
13.	"Me Entrego a Ti [acoustic]" (Video)
14.	"Qué Más Da [live]" (feat. Joy Huerta & Julio Ramírez Video)
15.	"His Eyes on the Sparrow [live]" (Video)
16.	"Quédate Lejos [live]" (feat. Maluma Video)
17.	"Si Pruebas una Vez [acoustic]" (Video)
18.	"Documentary film"

Latin America and Europe edition (CD)
No.	Title	Writer(s)	Producer(s)	Length
16.	"Te Dejo en Libertad" (feat. Maldita Nerea)	Ashley; Hanna; Ortega	Mitchell; Noriega; De La Loza^{[a]}	3:57
17.	"No Soy Yo"	Ashley; Hanna; Leonel García	Jules Ramllano	3:44
18.	"Pedazos"	Soraya	Ramllano	4:02
19.	"Te Quedaste" (acoustic)	Baqueiro; García	Ramllano	4:06
20.	"¿Qué Haré Con Este Amor?" (acoustic)	Alejandra Alberti; Ignacio Morales	Ramllanoa	3:28
21.	"Si Pruebas una Vez" (acoustic)	Juan Luis Broissin; Ángela Dávalos	Mitchell; Noriega; De La Loza^{[a]}	3:13
22.	"Ex de Verdad" (Big Band)	Ashley; Hanna; Rayo; Luengo	Rodolgo Vázquez	3:58
23.	"Perdón, Perdón" (Big Band)	Ashley; Hanna; Ortega	Vázquez	4:04
24.	"At Last" (Big Band)	Mack Gordon; Harry Warren	Vázquez	3:08

Latin America and Europe edition (DVD)
No.	Title	Length
1.	"Documentary film"
2.	"Quédate Lejos [live]" (feat. Maluma Video)
3.	"Si Pruebas una Vez [acoustic]" (Video)
4.	"Te Dejo en Libertad" (feat. Maldita Nerea Lyric Video)

Blu-Ray edition (DVD)
No.	Title	Length
1.	"Soy Mujer [live]" (Video)
2.	"Estés Donde Estés [live]" (Video)
3.	"Te Dejo en Libertad [live]" (Video)
4.	"Perdón, Perdón [live]" (Video)
5.	"¿Qué Hago Yo? [live]" (Video)
6.	"No Te Quiero Nada [live]" (feat. Axel Video)
7.	"Ex de Verdad [acoustic]" (Video)
8.	"No Tiene Devolución [live]" (Video)
9.	"Me Entrego a Ti [acoustic]" (Video)
10.	"Qué Más Da [live]" (feat. Joy Huerta & Julio Ramírez Video)
11.	"Ex de Verdad [acoustic]" (Video)
12.	"Dos Copas de Más [live]" (Video)
13.	"Lo Aprendí de Ti [live]" (Video)
14.	"Sé Que Te Vas [live]" (feat. Matisse Video)
15.	"His Eyes on the Sparrow [live]" (Video)
16.	"Odio Amarte [live]" (Video)

Notes

- ^{^[a]} signifies an additional producer

=== Formats ===
- CD;– includes the 14-track album.
- CD and DVD (Mexican edition) – Digipak case edition containing three discs: DVD of the concert and two CD containing 23 live tracks.
- CD and DVD (Europe edition) – Digipak case edition containing three discs: DVD of the concert and two CD containing 24 live tracks.
- Blu-ray – Blu-ray case edition containing: High Definition version of the concert on Blu-ray.
- Digital download;– contains the 14 tracks from the CD release.
- Digital download (Mexican edition);– contains the 23 tracks from the CD release, two videos and a documentary.
- Digital download (Europe edition);– contains the 24 tracks from the CD release, three videos and a documentary.

== Credits and personnel ==
Credits adapted from the liner notes of the Mexican deluxe edition of Primera Fila: Hecho Realidad.

=== Musicians ===
- Ashley Grace – vocals (all tracks), guitar (2, 10)
- Hanna Nicole – vocals (all tracks), guitar (2, 8–9, 20), keyboards (3–4, 6, 14), mandoline (5, 10)
- Pablo De La Loza: background Vocals (1–7, 9), keyboards (1–3, 5, 7, 9, 11–13, 15, 20)
- Tim Mitchell: background Vocals (1–7, 9), guitar (1–7, 9, 11–14, 15)
- Uri Natenzon: bass (1–7, 9, 11–13, 15)
- Ben Peeler: guitar (1, 6) lap steel guitar (2–5, 7, 9, 11–13, 15), mandoline (5)
- Ezequiel Ghilardi: drums (1–7, 9, 11–13, 15)
- Jules Ramllano: drums (16–17), guitar (16–17), keyboards (16–17)
- Álex Gómez: drums (18–19), percussion (18–19)
- Julio Ramírez: background Vocals (8) guitar (8)
- Joy Huerta: vocals (8)
- Axel: vocals (10) guitar (10)
- Román Torres: vocals (11) guitar (11)
- Pablo Preciado: vocals (11) guitar (11)
- Melissa Robles: vocals (11)
- Maluma: vocals (15)
- Concetta costanzo: background vocals (18–19)

=== Production ===
- Tim Mitchell: producer (1–15, 20), programmer (1–15, 20), arrangements (1–15, 20), additional engineer (1–15, 20)
- George Noriega: producer (1–15, 20), programmer (1–15, 20), arrangements (1–15, 20), additional engineer (1–15, 20)
- Pablo De La Loza: co-producer (1–15, 20), programmer (1–15, 20), arrangements (1–15, 20), additional engineer (1–15, 20)
- Rodolfo Vásquez: producer (21–23), mastering (16–19)
- Jules Ramllano: producer (16–19), mixing (16–19, 21–23), ingeniería (16–19)
- Brad Blackwood: mastering engineering (1–15, 20)
- Juan Pablo Fallucca: recording engineer (1–7, 9, 11–13, 15)
- Charles Dye: mixing engineer (1–7, 9, 11–13, 15)
- Dave Clauss: mixing engineer (8, 10, 14, 20)
- Quaz: recording engineer (8, 10, 14, 20)
- Samuel De Leo: arrangements (16–17), assistant mixer (16–17, 21–23)
- Memo Parra: arrangements (16–17), assistant mixer (16–17, 21–23)
- Joel Alonso: engineer (16–19)
- Alfonso Palacios: engineer (16–19)
- Gerardo Morgado: engineer (16–19)
- Mateo Aguilar: arrangements (18–19)
- Fernando Ruíz Velasco: arrangements (18–19)
- Rodrigo Duarte: arrangements (18–19)
- Edy Vega: arrangements (18–19)
- Lary Ruíz Velasco: arrangements (18–19)
- Roberto Collío: engineer (21–23)

=== Design ===
- Paul Forat: A&R
- Raúl Ruiz Alarcón: A&R
- Gonzalo Herrerías: A&R
- Nahuel Lerena: video director, video editor
- Pato Byrne: video editor
- Vicente Solís: video Management
- Aldo Ballasteros: video Management
- Chino Lemus: album Artwork photographer
- David Zepeda: graphic and logo design
- Ricardo Villarreal: photography
- Jennifer Pochat: documentary Director

== Charts ==
=== Weekly charts ===
Weekly chart performance for Primera Fila: Hecho Realidad
Chart (2014–2015)	Peak position
México (AMPROFON)	1
Spain (PROMUSICAE)	52
United States (Billboard Latin)	16

=== Year-end charts ===
2014 year-end chart performance
Chart (2014)	Position
Mexican Albums (AMPROFON)	25

2015year-end chart performance
Chart (2015)	Position
Mexican Albums (AMPROFON)	8

2016year-end chart performance
Chart (2016)	Position
Mexican Albums (AMPROFON)	22

== Certifications ==
Region	Certification	Certified units/sales
Argentina (CAPIF)	Gold	10,000^{^}
Colombia (ASINCOL)	Platinum	
Mexico (AMPROFON)	Diamond+2× Platinum	420,000^{‡}
Perú (UNIMPRO)	2× Platinum	
Summaries
Central America (CFC)	Platinum	20,000
Worldwide	—	600,000
^{^} Shipments figures based on certification alone.^{‡} Sales+streaming figures based on certification alone.

== Release history ==
Region	Date	Edition(s)	Format	Label
Mexico	11 November 2014	Standard Edition	CD; Digital download	Sony Music Latin
United States	11 November 2014	Standard Edition	CD; Digital download	Sony Music Latin
Mexico	11 November 2014	Blu-Ray Edition	CD; Blu-ray	Sony Music México
Mexico	13 November 2015	Deluxe Edition	2 CD/DVD; Digital download	Sony Music México
United States	13 November 2015	Deluxe Edition	2 CD/DVD; Digital download	Sony Music Latin
Latin America	4 March 2016	Deluxe Edition	2 CD/DVD; Digital download	Sony Music Latin
Spain	4 March 2016	Deluxe Edition	2 CD/DVD; Digital download	Sony Music Spain
