= No Te Quiero Nada =

2008 song by Ha*Ash

Single by Ha*Ash

from the album Habitación Doble
- Language: Spanish
- English title: "I Don't Love You At All"
- Released: 8 July 2008
- Recorded: 2006–2007 in Nashville, Tennessee
- Genre: Latin pop
- Length: 4:12
- Label: Sony Music Latin
- Songwriter: Áureo Baqueiro
- Producer: Áureo Baqueiro

Ha*Ash singles chronology
"Tu Mirada en Mi" (2006)	"No Te Quiero Nada" (2008)	"Lo Que Yo Sé de Ti" (2008)

Music video
- "No Te Quiero Nada" on YouTube

"No Te Quiero Nada" (transl. "I Don't Want You At All") is a song by American duo Ha*Ash. It was first included on Ha*Ash third studio album Habitación Doble (2008) where it was released on July 8, 2008, as the first single and then included on their live albums Primera Fila: Hecho Realidad (2014) and Ha*Ash: En Vivo (2019).

A live version featuring Argentine singer Axel it was released through Sony Music Latin on 15 September 2015 as the fifth single from album, Primera Fila: Hecho Realidad. The song was written by Áureo Baqueiro.

== Music video ==
A music video for "No Te Quiero Nada" was published on her YouTube channel on October 25, 2009. As of October 2019, the video has over 89 million views on YouTube.

The second music video for "No Te Quiero Nada" recorded live for his album A Tiempo (DVD) was released on August 1, 2011.

The third video for "No Te Quiero Nada", recorded live for the live album Ha*Ash: En Vivo, was released on December 6, 2019. The video was filmed in Auditorio Nacional, Mexico City.

== Commercial performance ==
The track peaked at number 6 in the Latin Pop Songs, number 14 in the Hot Latin songs and at number 14 in the Latin Airplay charts in the United States. In Mexico, the song peaked at number 7 on the Monitor Latino and at number 31 in the Mexico Espanol Airplay. In Spain, the song peaked at number 50 on the PROMUSICAE.

== Cover versions ==
On 2017, Mexican Singer Karol Sevilla posted a cover of the song on YouTube.

== Credits and personnel ==
Credits adapted from AllMusic.

Recording and management

- Recording Country: México
- Sony / ATV Discos Music Publishing LLC / Westwood Publishing
- (P) 2014 Sony Music Entertainment US Latin LLC
- Published by: Brava! Songs
- Published by: Warner Chappell Music Publishing

Ha*Ash

- Ashley Grace – vocals, guitar
- Hanna Nicole – vocals, guitar, piano

Additional personnel

- Áureo Baqueiro; – producer, engingeer, chorus, songwriting
- Ricardo Calderón – photography

== Charts ==
Chart	Position
Mexico (Monitor Latino)	1
Mexico (Billboard Espanol Airplay)	31
Spain (PROMUSICAE)	50
US Hot Latin Songs (Billboard)	14
US Latin Pop Airplay (Billboard)	6

== Awards and nominations ==
Year	Awards ceremony	Award	Results
2009	ASCAP	Favorite Song Year	Won
2009	Billboard Latin Music Awards	Favorite Song	Nominated
2009	Premios Dial	The Best Spain	Won

== Version Primera fila: Hecho realidad ==
"No Te Quiero Nada"

Single by Ha*Ash, Axel

from the album Primera Fila: Hecho Realidad
- Language: Spanish
- English title: "I Don't Love You At All"
- Released: 30 September 2015
- Recorded: 2014 in Lake Charles, Louisiana
- Genre: Acoustic Music; country
- Length: 3:58
- Label: Sony Music U.S Latin
- Songwriter: Áureo Baqueiro
- Producers: George Noriega; Tim Mitchell

Ha*Ash, Axel singles chronology
"Ex de Verdad" (2015)	"No Te Quiero Nada" (2015)	"Dos Copas de Más" (2015)

Music video
- "No Te Quiero Nada" on YouTube

"No Te Quiero Nada" (transl. "I Don't Love You At All") is the fifth single of the live album Primera Fila: Hecho Realidad by American duo Ha*Ash featuring Argentina singer Axel. The single was officially released on September 15, 2015. The track peaked at number one on the Monitor Latino on México. The song was certified gold in México.

The music video of the song is the live performance by Ha*Ash in Lake Charles, Louisiana. A music video for "No Te Quiero Nada" was released on May 1, 2015. It was directed by Nahuel Lerena. The video was filmed in Lake Charles, Louisiana, United States. As of October 2019, the video has over 49 million views on YouTube.

=== Credits and personnel ===
Credits adapted from AllMusic.

Recording and management

- Recording Country: United States
- Sony / ATV Discos Music Publishing LLC / Westwood Publishing
- (P) 2014 Sony Music Entertainment México, S.A. De C.V.

Ha*Ash

- Ashley Grace – vocals, guitar
- Hanna Nicole – vocals, guitar

Additional personnel

- Axel – vocals, guitar
- Áureo Baqueiro – songwriting
- Pablo De La Loza – co-productor.
- George Noriega – producer
- Tim Mitchell – producer

=== Charts and certifications ===
Chart	Position
Mexico (Monitor Latino)	1

Region	Certification	Certified units/sales
Mexico (AMPROFON)	Platinum	60,000^{‡}
^{‡} Sales+streaming figures based on certification alone.

== Release history ==
Region	Date	Edition(s)	Format	Label	Ref.
Various	July 8, 2008	Standard	CD Single	Sony Music Latin	
Various	March 20, 2012	Acoustic Version	Digital download; streaming	Sony Music Latin	
Various	September 30, 2015	Axel Remix	Digital download; streaming	Sony Music Latin	
Various	December 6, 2019	Live Version	Digital download; streaming	Sony Music Latin	
