= Mi Niña Mujer =

Single by Los Ángeles Azules featuring Ha*Ash

from the album De Plaza en Plaza
- Language: Spanish
- Released: August 5, 2016
- Genre: Cumbia
- Length: 3:14
- Label: OCESA Seitrack
- Songwriter: Jorge Mejía Avante
- Producer: Camilo Lara

Los Ángeles Azules singles chronology
"La Cumbia del Infinito" (2016)	"Mi Niña Mujer" (2016)	"Mi Cantar" (2016)

Ha*Ash singles chronology
"Sé Que Te Vas" (2016)	"Mi Niña Mujer" (2016)	"Destino o Casualidad" (2017)

Music video
- "Mi Niña Mujer" on YouTube

"Mi Niña Mujer" is a song by Mexican group Los Ángeles Azules from Los Ángeles Azules's 1996 studio album Inolvidables. A remix version featuring American duo Ha*Ash was released on August 5, 2016. The track peaked at number 31 in the Mexico Airplay, number 11 in the Mexico Espanol Airplay charts in México.

== Background and release ==
"Mi Niña Mujer" was written by Jorge Mejía Avante, and produced by Camilo Lara. Is a song recorded by Mexican group Los Ángeles Azules from Los Ángeles Azules's 1996 studio album Inolvidables. A Remix version with American duo Ha*Ash it was released as the third single from the album De Plaza en Plaza on August 5, 2016, by OCESA Seitrack.

== Music video ==
A music video for "Mi Niña Mujer" featuring Ha*Ash was released on August 6, 2016. It was directed by Diego Álvarez and produced by Miguel Tafich and Sabú Avilés. The video was filmed in Convento San Miguel Arcángel, Maní, Yucatán with the song "Perdón, Perdón". As of March 2020, the video has over 246 million views on YouTube.

== Live performances ==
Los Ángeles Azules and Ha*Ash performed "Mi Niña Mujer" for the first time at the "Los 40 Principales" in México in October 2016.

== Charts ==
Chart	Position
Mexico (Billboard Mexican Airplay)	31
Mexico (Billboard Espanol Airplay)	11
