= Sé Que Te Vas =

Single by Ha*Ash

from the album Primera Fila: Hecho Realidad
- Language: Spanish
- English title: "I Know You Are Leaving"
- Released: 26 April 2016
- Recorded: 7 July 2014 in Mexico City, México
- Genre: Acoustic Music; power ballad
- Length: 4:01(with Matisse, 2014); 4:03(solo version, 2016)
- Label: Sony Music U.S Latin
- Songwriters: Ashley Grace Pérez; Hanna Nicole Pérez; Pablo Preciado
- Producers: George Noriega; Tim Mitchell

Ha*Ash singles chronology
"Dos Copas de Más" (2015)	"Sé Que Te Vas" (2016)	"Mi Niña Mujer" (2016)

Music video
- "Sé Que Te Vas" on YouTube

"Sé Que Te Vas" (transl. "I Know You Are Leaving") is a song written and recorded by American duo performer Ha*Ash. It was first included on Ha*Ash' 1st live album "Primera Fila: Hecho Realidad" featuring Mexican group Matisse and then recorded live for his edition deluxe in 2016. A solo version was released on April 24, 2016. The music video of the song is the live performance by Ha*Ash in Estudios Churubusco, City Mexico on 7 July 2014. The song then included on their live album Ha*Ash: En Vivo (2019). It was written by Ashley Grace, Hanna Nicole and Pablo Preciado.

== Background and release ==
"Sé Que Te Vas" was written by Ashley Grace, Hanna Nicole and Pablo Preciado and produced by George Noriega, Tim Mitchell and Pablo De La Loza. Is a song recorded by American duo Ha*Ash from her live album Primera Fila: Hecho Realidad. A solo version it was released as the sixth single from the album on April 26, 2016, by Sony Music Entertainment.

== Music video ==
A music video for "Sé Que Te Vas" featuring Matisse was released on May 6, 2015. It was directed by Nahuel Lerena. The video was filmed in Estudios Churubusco, City Mexico. As of October 2019, the video has over 210 million views on YouTube.

The second music video for "Sé Que Te Vas" (solo version) was released on June 10, 2016. As of October 2019, the video has over 51 million views on YouTube.

The third video for "Sé Que Te Vas", recorded live for the live album Ha*Ash: En Vivo, was released on December 6, 2019. The video was filmed in Auditorio Nacional, Mexico City.

== Commercial performance ==
The track peaked at number 28 in the Mexico Espanol Airplay and at number 16 in the Monitor Latino on México. The song was certified gold in México.

== Credits and personnel ==
Credits adapted from AllMusic.

Recording and management

- Recording Country: México
- Sony / ATV Discos Music Publishing LLC / Westwood Publishing
- (P) 2014 Sony Music Entertainment US Latin LLC
- (P) 2016 Sony Music Entertainment US Latin LLC

Ha*Ash

- Ashley Grace – vocals, guitar, songwriting
- Hanna Nicole – vocals, guitar, piano, songwriting

Additional personnel

- Pablo De La Loza – chorus, production
- Pablo Preciado – songwriting
- Paul Forat – A&R. programming, production
- Ezequiel Ghilardi – bass
- Gonzalo Herrerias – A&R
- George Noriega – producer
- Tim Mitchell – producer

== Cover versions ==
In June 2015, Mexican band Matisse recorded a cover version for her album Sube (Deluxe).

== Charts ==
Chart	Position
Mexico (Monitor Latino)	16
Mexico (Billboard Espanol Airplay)	28

== Certifications ==
Region	Certification	Certified units/sales
Mexico (AMPROFON)	Gold	30,000^{‡}
^{‡} Sales+streaming figures based on certification alone.

== Awards and nominations ==
Year	Awards ceremony	Award	Results
2016	Premios Quiero	Best Music Video	Won
2017	VEVO Certified	100,000,000 views	Won

== Release history ==
Region	Date	Edition(s)	Format	Label	Ref.
Various	November 14, 2015	Matisse Version	Digital download; streaming	Sony Music Latin	
Various	April 26, 2016	Standard Edition	Digital download; streaming	Sony Music Latin	
Various	December 6, 2019	Live Version	Digital download; streaming	Sony Music Latin	
