= Ha*Ash =

American musical duo

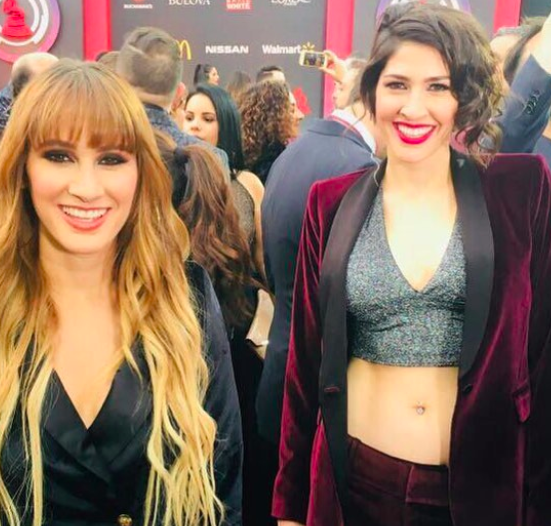
- Ha*Ash in Latin Grammys 2017; Hanna Nicole (left), Ashley Grace (right)

Background information
- Also known as: The Sold-Out Queens; JACH
- Origin: Lake Charles, Louisiana, U.S
- Genres: Country pop; electropop; funk; Latin pop; pop rock
- Years active: 2002–present
- Label: Sony Latin
- Members: Ashley Grace Pérez; Hanna Nicole Pérez
- Website: ha-ash.com

Ha*Ash is a Mexican-American Latin pop duo from Lake Charles, Louisiana, formed in 2002 by sisters Hanna Nicole (born 1985) and Ashley Grace (born 1987). The group's name is a portmanteau of letters from their first names. They have released six studio albums, with the most recent, Haashtag, being released in 2022. From 2014 to 2017, all of their singles received at least a gold certification from the Mexican Association of Producers of Phonograms and Videograms. They are the first group to have one ballad in Spanish with at least one billion views on YouTube.

In addition to Latin pop, Ha*Ash incorporates country pop, pop rock, and singer-songwriter styles into their music, and they have cited artists such as Shania Twain, Loretta Lynn, and The Chicks as influences. They are also known for their philanthropy and social activism, including their work on behalf of children. In 2007, Ha*Ash founded the nonprofit organization Fondo Ha*Ash, which supports immigrants and children suffering from HIV/AIDS, among other causes.

Ha*Ash has sold more than 20 million copies worldwide.

== Early and personal lives ==
Hanna and Ashley were born in Lake Charles, Louisiana, United States, to Antonio and Mathilda Pérez (née Mosa). Their grandfather is of Mexican descent, and their grandmothers were of German and Spanish ancestry. The family had been living in Lake Charles for generations.

Since they were little, they have been inclined towards art, music being their main passion. They began performing in church (Pine Grove Baptist Church of DeQuincy) at the ages of 5 and 4. Music classes and training became part of their daily chores, touring Louisiana at age 12, singing at fairs, rodeos, even participating in the Louisiana State Penitentiary, the largest state prison in the United States. They took courses in tap, jazz, ballet, hip hop, gymnastics, acting, theater and body language and also they studied piano and guitar.

Because their father worked outside the United States, Hanna and Ashley spent half of each year in Mexico City and half in Lake Charles, living at times, 6 months of the year in each city, since they were little her father and grandfather taught them to speak Spanish, perfecting it in the modern American school where he studied in Mexico.

=== Personal lives ===
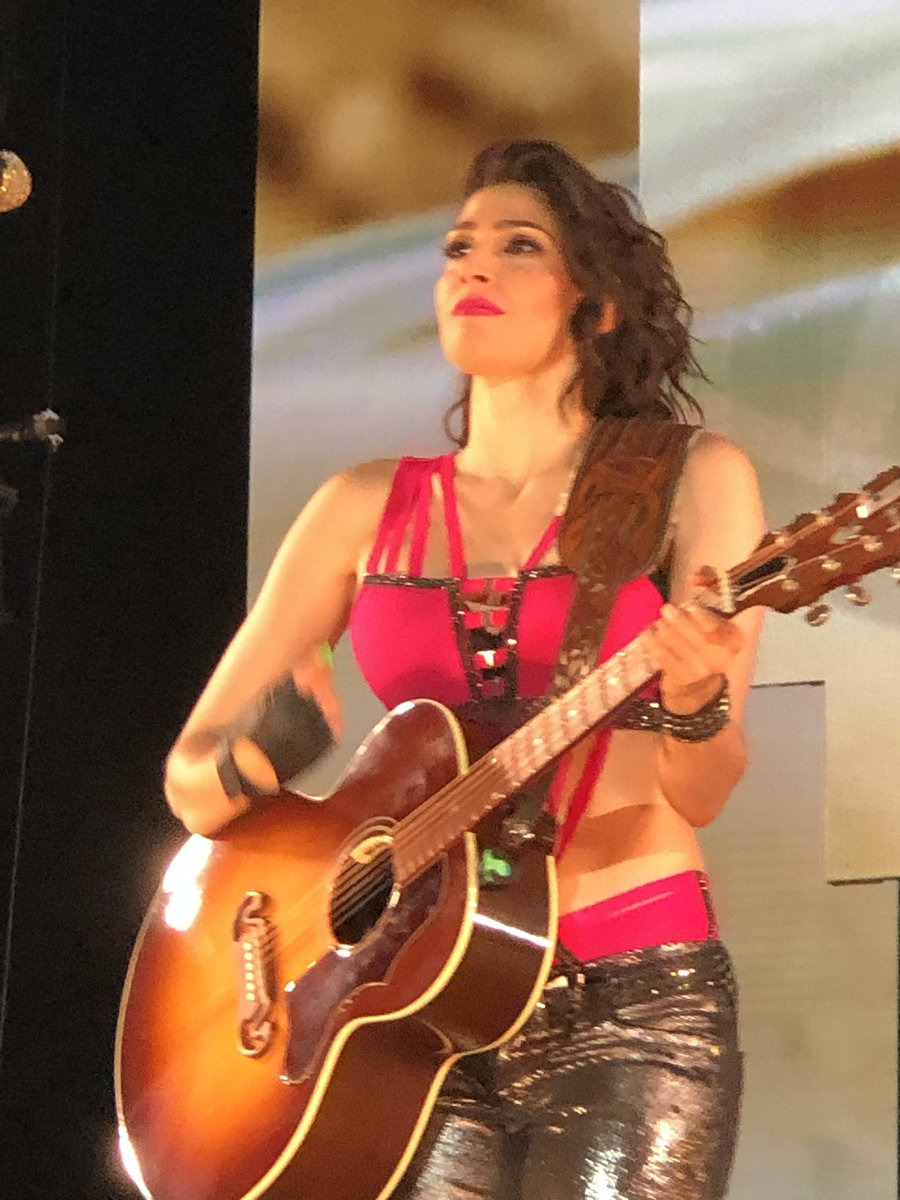
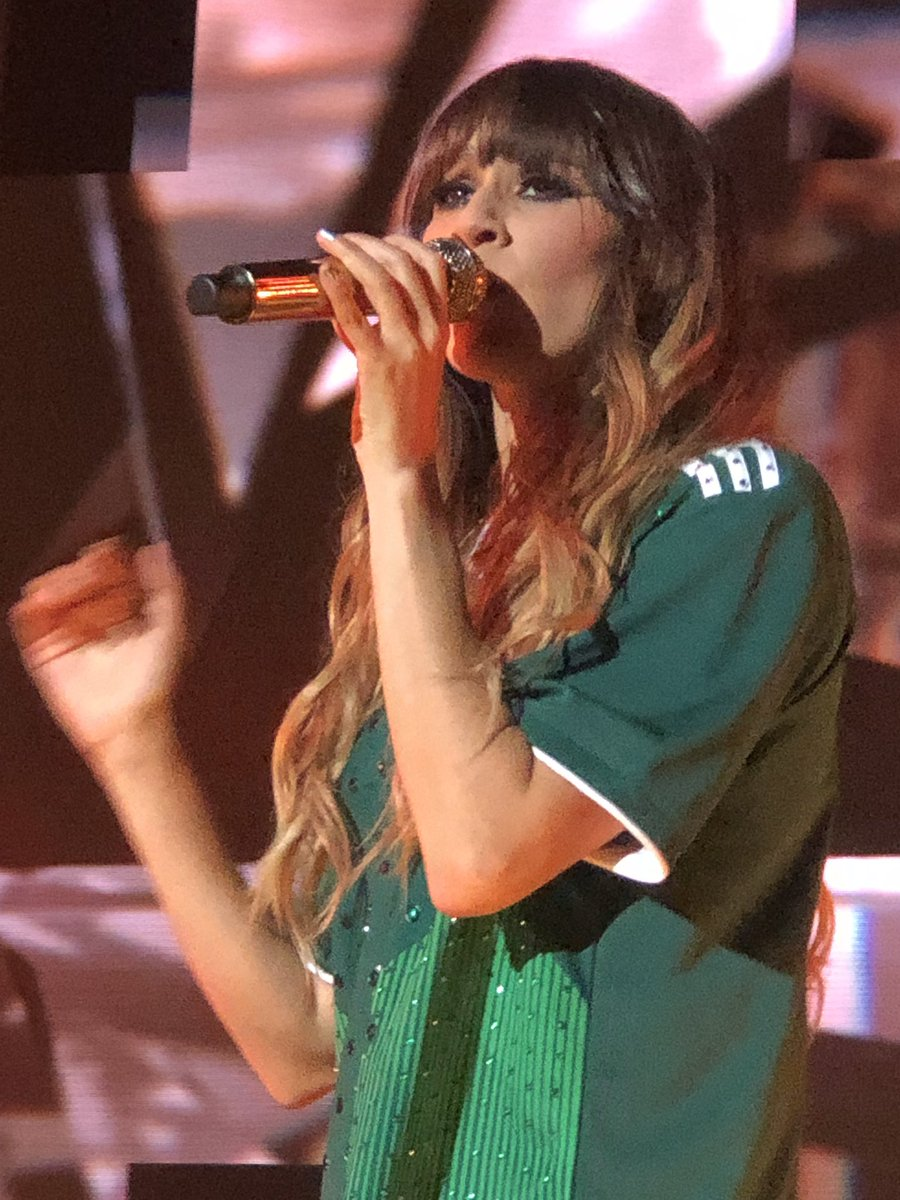
Ashley Grace (Left), Hanna Nicole (Right).

Although reticent concerning their private lives, Ha*Ash have mentioned the divorce of their parents, who separated in early 2005, while the sisters were recording their second album Mundos Opuestos. The songs "Todo No Fue Suficiente" and "Sé Que Te Vas", addressed this topic. The sisters speak both English and Spanish, and both have Mexican and US citizenship. They both reside in Houston, Texas.

In 2012, Hanna Nicole began dating Mexican-American Juan Carlos Herrera. The couple were married on January 9, 2016, with her fiancé Juan Carlos Herrera after 4 years of relationship. The wedding took place in Cuernavaca, Morelos, with her sister Ashley and the singer Joy Huerta from Jesse & Joy, the bridesmaids and those in charge of singing the waltz for the newlyweds. On December 8, 2019, during the final part of a concert with Ha*Ash, metallic pink papers were released at the end of the performance of the song "Perdón, Perdón", later, on December 19, he announced that he was waiting for his first daughter, detailing that those released papers reflected the sex of the baby. Their daughter Mathilda Grace Herrera was born on June 2, 2020, in Houston.

In 2017, Ashley Grace went public with her diagnosis of mild OCD.

== Career ==
=== 2002–2004: Formation and self-titled album ===
In April 2002, the sisters adopted the name Ha*Ash and signed to Sony Music Latin when they were 16 and 15. The same year, they signed a management deal with Seitrack Management (OCESA Seitrack). In April 2002 they released their first single, "Odio Amarte", which was a hit on Mexican radio stations, TV channels, and festivals. They recorded their self-titled debut album Ha*Ash with the Mexican producer Áureo Baqueiro. The album was released on May 11, 2003, and peaked at No. 3 in the Mexican album charts and No. 19 in the US Billboard Latin Pop Albums chart.

Their second single "Estés Donde Estés" was used as the theme for the Televisa telenovela Clap, el lugar de tus sueños, which provided wider dissemination of their music. It peaked at No. 9 on Billboard Latin Pop chart and No. 14 on the Hot Latin Tracks chart. The ballad "Te Quedaste" peaked at No. 17 on Billboard Latin Pop chart and No. 28 on Hot Latin Tracks. Ha*Ash appeared on the soundtrack to the Mexican animated film Magos y Gigantes, contributing the song "Un Amigo Así". Throughout 2003 and 2004, they performed 150 concerts in Mexico, including an appearance at the Teatro Metropólitan in Mexico City.

In February 2004, they received their first gold record for sales of more than 75,000 copies of their debut album in Mexico, followed by a platinum award the following month. In 2005, their single "Soy Mujer", was used in the third version of Big Brother VIP Mexico. Another single, "Si Pruebas una Vez", was released in November 2005. A special edition of the debut album was released, featuring videos and interviews.

=== 2005–2007: Mundos Opuestos ===
The second Ha*Ash album, Mundos Opuestos, was also produced by Áureo Baqueiro. It was released by the BMG label on September 27, 2005. The album features a cover of the 1935 song "I Want to Be a Cowboy's Sweetheart". The album peaked at No. 8 in the Mexican album charts, and was certified platinum in Mexico. The album's first single "Amor a Medias" reached No. 4 on the Mexican chart. The second single, "Me Entrego a Ti", was written by Colombian artist Soraya and reached No. 15 on the Latin Pop Songs charts in the United States. The third single, "¿Qué Hago Yo?", was also written by Soraya and peaked at No. 50 in the Latin Pop Songs charts in the United States, and at No. 1 in Mexico in the Monitor Latino chart and No. 36 on the Mexico Espanol Airplay chart. Another single, "Tu Mirada en Mi", reached No. 50 on Billboard Latin Pop chart.

The song "Código Postal", released on a special edition of Mundos Opuestos, was used as the theme for the Televisa telenovela Código Postal. Ha*Ash played three shows at Teatro Metropolitan in Mexico City in July 2007.

=== 2008–2010: Habitación Doble ===
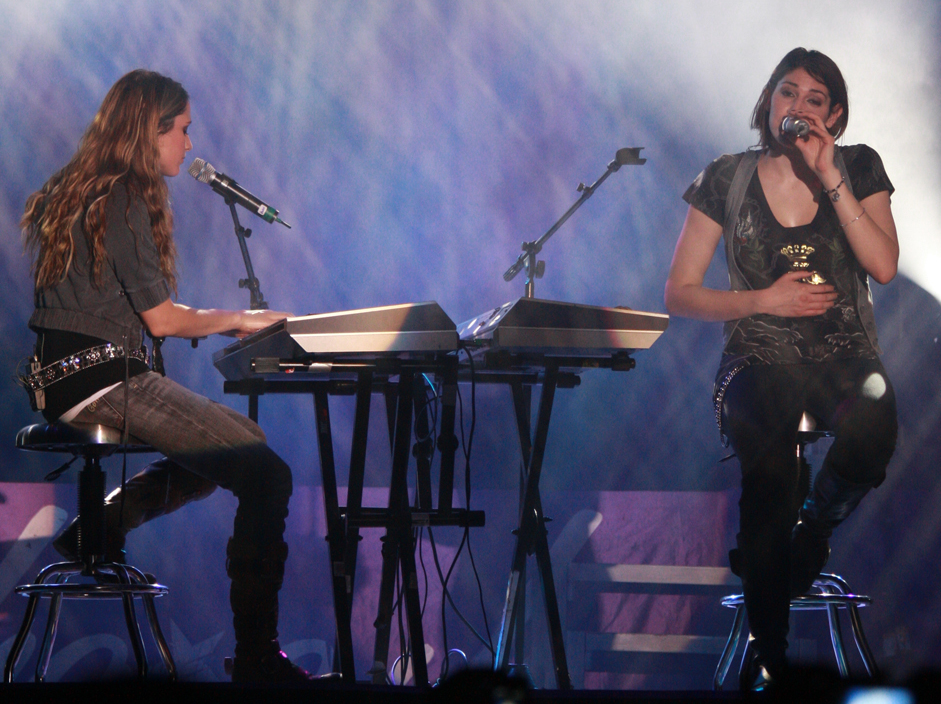
Hanna Nicole (left) and Ashley Grace (right) performing on September 6, 2008

Ha*Ash recorded their third album, Habitación Doble, in Nashville, Tennessee. This album features Brandi Carlile on the song "Already Home", which was the group's first song in English. "Already Home" was featured as a free "Single of the Week" on the Apple iTunes music store in the United States in September 2008. The song was included on the soundtrack for the Mexican film Rock Marí. Habitación Doble also features collaborations with Kany García, Gian Marco, and Leonel García. Ha*Ash described the album as more "pop-rock and soft ballads". The album was released in August 2008 and peaked at No. 6 in the Mexican album charts and No. 14 in the US Billboard Latin Pop Albums. The album was eventually certified gold in Mexico.

The first single from the album was "No Te Quiero Nada", released in July 2008. It peaked at No. 6 on Billboard Latin Pop chart, at No. 1 on the Monitor Latino chart, and at No. 31 in the Mexico Espanol Airplay. The song won an award from Cadena Dial. The second single, "Lo Que Yo Sé de Ti", was released in November 2008 and peaked at No. 1 in the Mexico Airplay, Mexico Espanol Airplay, and Monitor Latino charts. In 2008 they worked on film projects such as the Spanish versions of MGM's Igor, and recorded the song "Cree y Atrévete" for the soundtrack to Disney's Tinker Bell.

"Tú y Yo Volvemos al Amor" was released in February 2009 and peaked at No. 20 on the Mexico Español Airplay chart and No. 31 in the Mexico Airplay chart. A special edition of Habitación Doble was released with four new songs and a DVD. They performed for the first time in Spain on July 5, 2009, in the small town of Barbera del Valles, promoted by that municipality and Cadena Dial. The same week they visited the TV show Operation Triunfo Academy. In 2009 they played for the first time in the Auditorio Nacional in Mexico City. They also appeared in the Reventour, a series of concerts in several cities in Mexico. In 2010 Ha*Ash contributed to the Mecano tribute album Tributo a Ana, José y Nacho, recording a new version of "Mujer Contra Mujer".

=== 2011–2013: A Tiempo ===
The fourth Ha*Ash album, A Tiempo, featured a stripped-down synth-pop sound. Ha*Ash again worked with producer Áureo Baqueiro, while Michele Canova made a contribution. The album was released in May 2011 and peaked at No. 4 on the Mexican album chart and was certified double platinum Mexico. The first single "Impermeable" peaked at No. 1 on the Mexico Español Airplay chart and No. 6 on the Mexico Airplay chart, and was certified gold in Mexico. "Te Dejo en Libertad" was released in July and peaked at No. 29 on the Billboard Latin Pop chart and No. 1 on the Mexico Español Airplay, Mexico Airplay, and Monitor Latino charts, receiving a platinum certification.

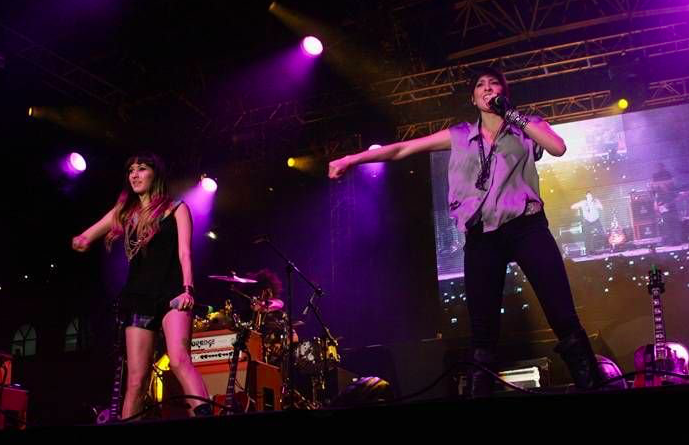
Ha*Ash live in Zacatecas, Mexico during the A Tiempo tour

Ha*Ash embarked on a lengthy world tour from 2011 to 2013, visiting Mexico, the United States, Spain, Costa Rica, Peru, and Ecuador. Early in the tour they opened for Shakira in Mexico City and Guadalajara. In late 2011 they appeared on the Hombres G tribute album En la playa, recording a new version of "Temblando" with David Summers.

The third single from A Tiempo, "Todo No Fue Suficiente", peaked at No. 2 on the Mexico Español Airplay chart and No. 11 on the Mexico Airplay chart. The fourth single "¿De Dónde Sacas Eso?" was certified gold in Mexico. On March 20, 2012, a special edition of the album was released including three new tracks and a DVD documentary about the world tour.

In 2012 Ha*Ash participated in the Talent program La voz... México as co-coaches for the Beto Cuevas team. They also appeared in an episode of Phineas & Ferb. They made a guest appearance on the song "Te Voy a Perder" by Leonel García in 2013. Also that year, Ashley Grace appeared on the song "Unéme" by Dan Masciarelli.

=== 2014–2017: Primera Fila: Hecho Realidad ===
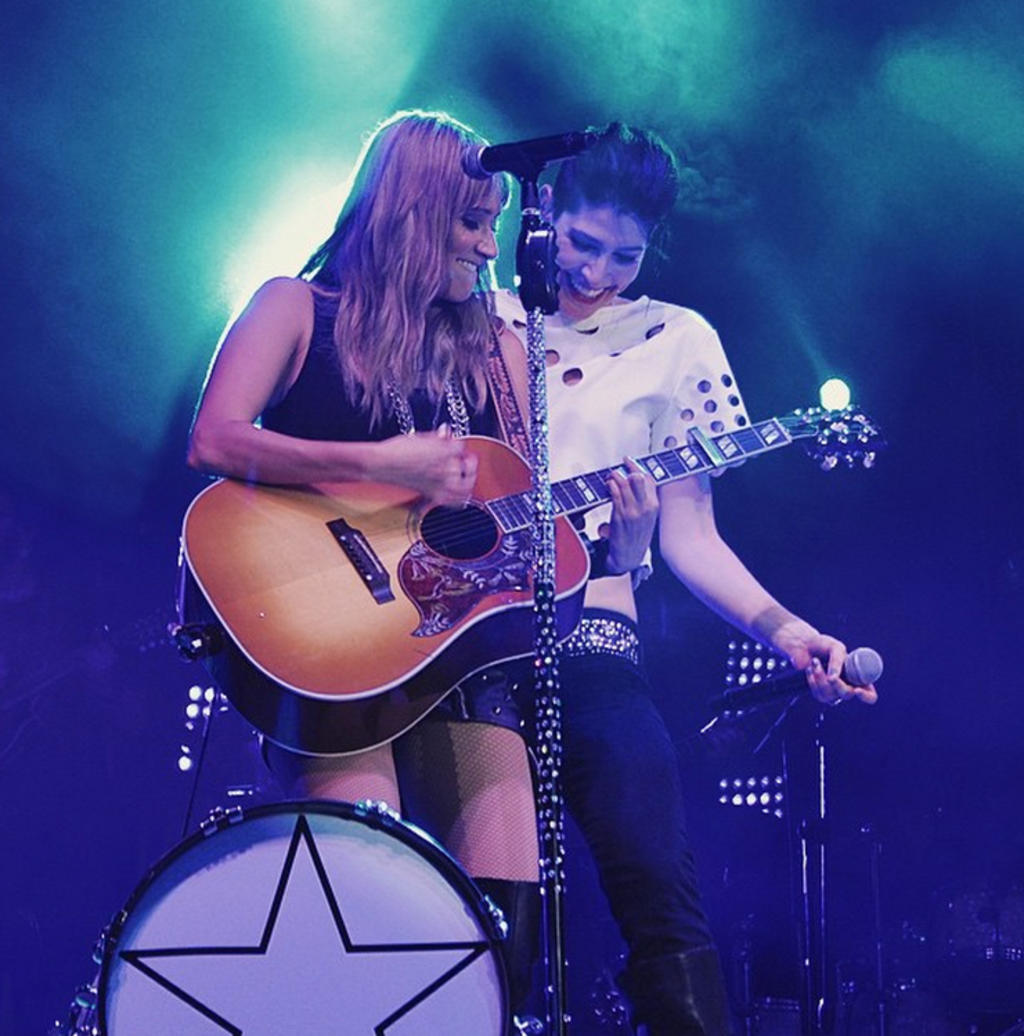
Ha*Ash performing on their 1f Hecho Realidad Tour in 2015

At the end of the A Tiempo tour, Ha*Ash began the production of their first live album, Primera Fila: Hecho Realidad, which was released in 2014. The album includes material from their four studio albums as well as eight newly recorded songs. The album features collaborations with several performers, including Julio Ramírez, Maluma, Joy Huerta, Matisse, and Axel. The album was recorded in Lake Charles, LA, DeQuincy, LA, and Mexico City. The album peaked at No. 1 on the Mexican album charts and No. 14 on the US Billboard Latin Pop Albums chart. Ha*Ash worked with producers George Noriega, Pablo De La Loza, and Tim Mitchell. The album has been certified diamond in Mexico for sales exceeding 330,000 copies.

"Perdón, Perdón", was released as the lead single in September 2014. The track peaked at No. 17 on the Latin Pop Songs chart, No. 36 on the Hot Latin songs chart, and No. 35 on the Latin Airplay chart in the United States. In Mexico, the song peaked at No. 1 on the Mexican Singles chart and the Monitor Latino chart. The song was certified diamond in Mexico. The second single, "Lo Aprendí de Ti" was released in March 2015. The track peaked at No. 1 on the Mexican Singles chart and Monitor Latino chart. In the United States the song peaked at No. 19 in the Latin Pop Songs chart, No. 32 on the Hot Latin Songs chart, and at No. 59 on the Latin Airplay chart. The song was certified quadruple platinum in Mexico. In September 2015, Ha*Ash was the opening act for Ricky Martin's One World Tour in the southwestern United States. They started their own Primera Fila Tour in 2015, visiting Argentina, Costa Rica, Chile, Dominican Republic, Ecuador, El Salvador, Guatemala, Mexico, Peru, Spain, Uruguay, and Venezuela.

In November 2015, after the success of Primera Fila: Hecho Realidad, a special edition of the album was released with three new tracks, music videos, and a documentary about the tour. The new songs featured Big Band Jazz de Mexico. In 2015, they participated in the TV program Ven y Baila Quinceañera. Additionally, they worked on film projects such as the Spanish version of Sing: Ven y Canta!, with Ashley Grace recording the song "Al Fin" for the soundtrack.

Another single from Primera Fila: Hecho Realidad, "Sé Que Te Vas", was released in April 2016 and peaked at No. 28 on the Mexico Espanol Airplay chart and at No. 16 on the Monitor Latino chart. Two videos for the song were released, with one featuring Matisse. The song was certified gold in Mexico. After this, they appeared on the Peruvian/Argentine telenovela El Regreso de Lucas, contributing the song "Hasta Que Regreses". Ha*Ash appeared on the Los Ángeles Azules song "Mi Niña Mujer", and on the Melendi song "Destino o Casualidad".

During the Primera Fila Tour, Ha*Ash played in Puerto Rico for the first time, and in November 2016 they made their first appearance at the Palacio de los Deportes in Mexico City. The tour continued until September 2017.

=== 2017–2019: 30 de Febrero ===
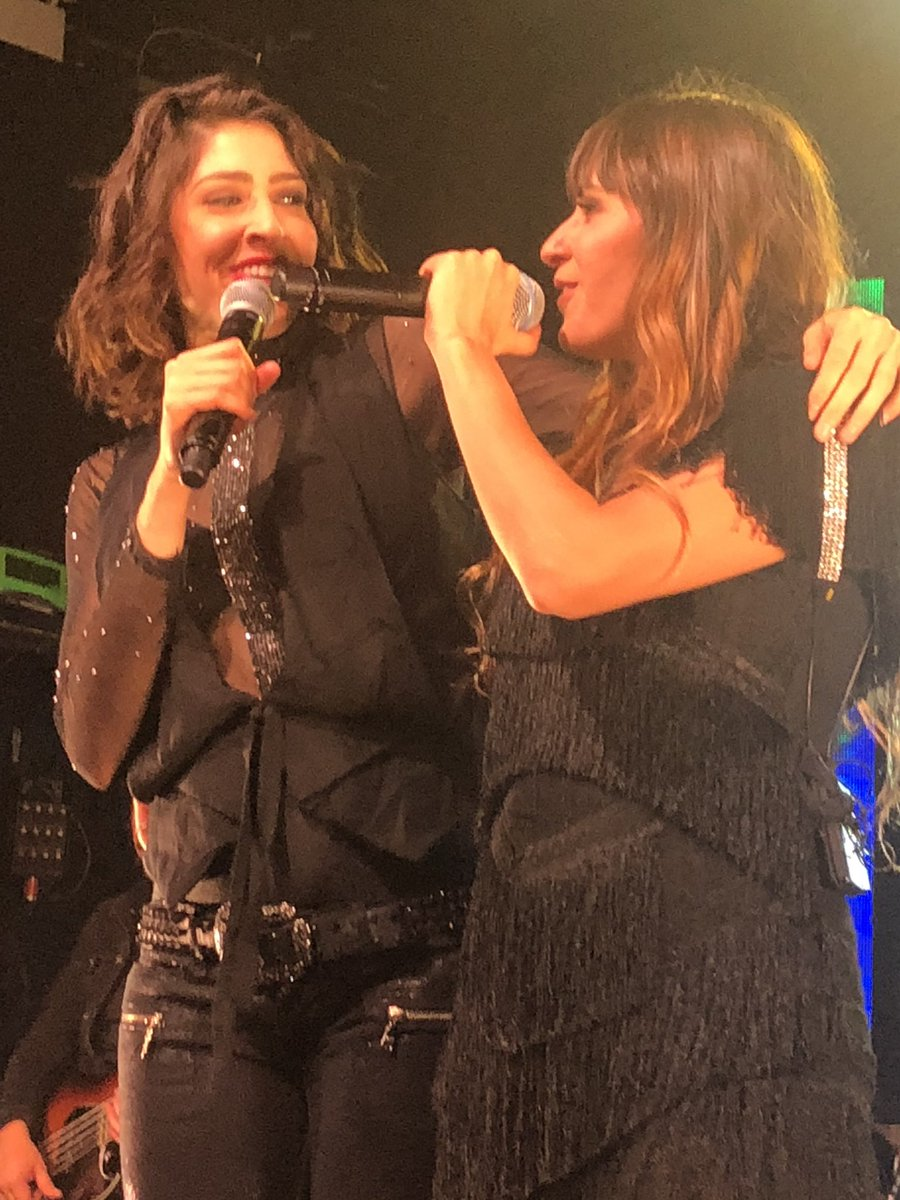
Ha*Ash performs in New York City on the Gira 100 años contigo on October 13, 2018.

In December 2017, Ha*Ash released the album 30 de Febrero, featuring Prince Royce and Abraham Mateo on the title track. Ha*Ash co-produced the album in collaboration with producers George Noriega, Matt Rad, Joe London, and Edgar Barrera. The majority of the album was recorded in Miami, Florida. The album peaked at No. 3 on the Mexican album chart, No. 11 on the US Billboard Latin Pop Albums chart, and No. 11 in the US Billboard Latin pop sales chart. The album was eventually certified platinum in Mexico.

The first single from the album was "100 Años" with Prince Royce, released in October 2017. The track peaked at No. 50 on the Latin Pop Songs chart and No. 24 on the Latin Airplay chart in the United States. In Mexico, the song peaked at No. 1 on the Mexico Espanol Airplay chart and the Monitor Latino chart. "100 Años" was certified triple platinum in Mexico and double platinum in Peru. In November Ha*Ash released the single "30 de Febrero" which features Abraham Mateo.

To promote the album, Ha*Ash embarked on a world tour called Gira 100 años contigo from early 2018 to early 2022. The tour began at the Viña del Mar International Song Festival in Chile. Ha*Ash won the Silver and Golden Seagull award after their performance. The tour included shows in South America, North America, and Europe. The second single "No Pasa Nada" was released in March 2018, peaking at No. 13 on the Mexico Airplay chart, No. 4 on the Mexico Espanol Airplay chart, and No. 2 on the Monitor Latino chart. In August 2018, they released the third single from the album, "Eso No Va a Suceder". The song peaked at No. 34 on the Latin Pop Songs chart in the United States and No. 1 of the Mexican Espanol Airplay and Monitor Latino charts in Mexico.

In October 2018, Ha*Ash became the first Latin group to be featured in the Spotify Singles song series, releasing a new version of "No Pasa Nada" and a cover of "Adiós Amor". In November 2018, Ha*Ash won the Best Latin America North Act at the 2018 MTV Europe Music Awards. "¿Qué Me Faltó?" was released as the fourth single from their latest album on January 4, 2019. The track peaked at No. 2 on the Monitor Latino chart in Mexico.

Ha*Ash performed the American national anthem for Monday Night Football at the Estadio Azteca in Mexico City on November 18, 2019. The following month, the group released the live album/video Ha*Ash: En Vivo, which included 22 songs recorded at the Auditorio Nacional in Mexico City in 2018. The album debuted at No. 1 on the AMPROFON chart in Mexico. "Si Tú No Vuelves" with Miguel Bosé was released as the lead single in December and peaked at No. 1 on the Monitor Latino chart in Mexico.

=== 2020–present: Haashtag ===
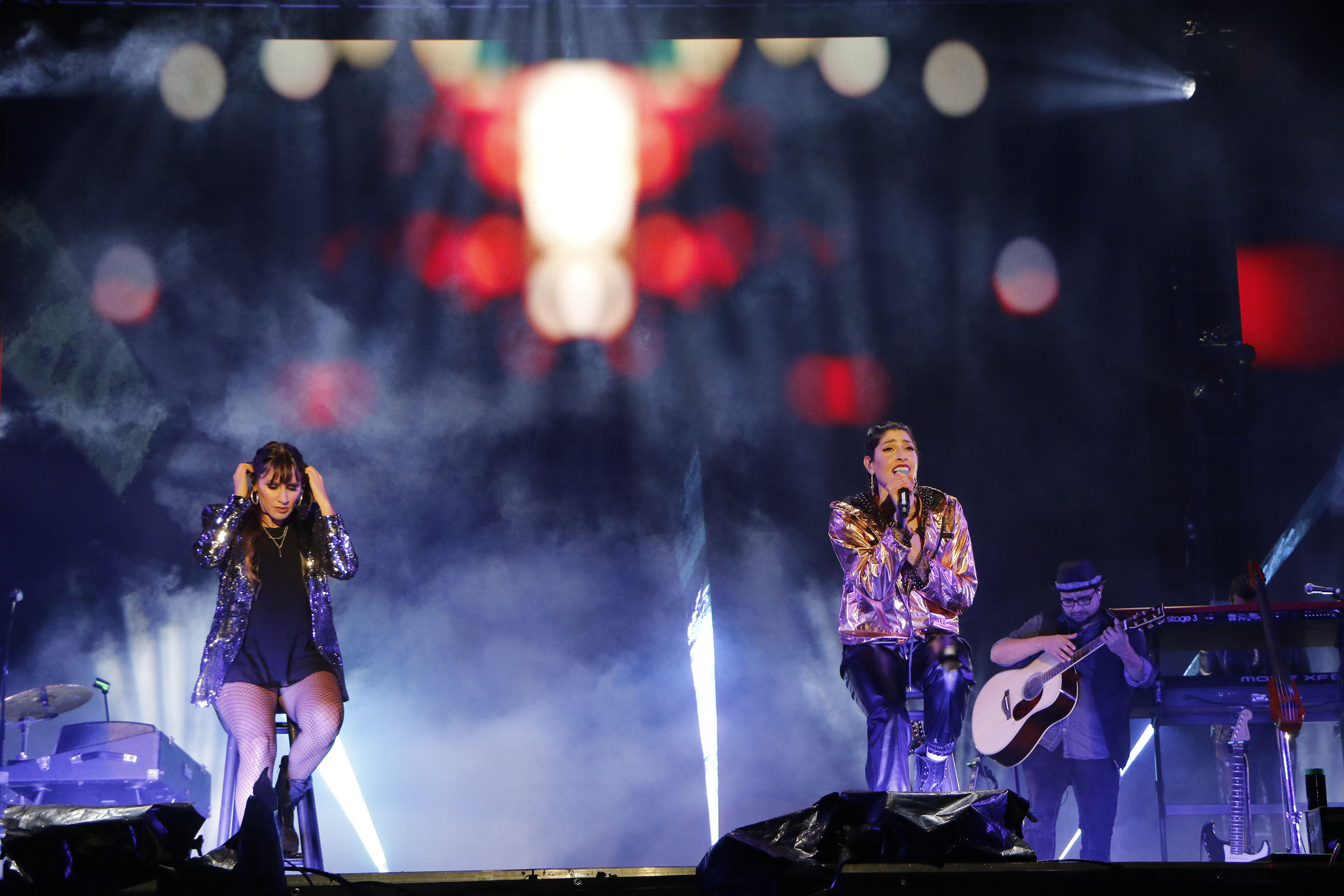
Ha*Ash performing during a show at the Zócalo in Mexico on February 14, 2020

In early 2020, Ha*Ash appeared on the song "Rosas en Mi Almohada" by María José. In March 2020, the group won the Most Popular Pop Artist award at the 2020 Spotify Awards. In April 2020, they took part in the Together at Home benefit event and participated in the charity single "Resistiré México", with proceeds donated to Mexican hospital relief efforts. A new album was announced in May 2020. In September 2020, the video for "Lo Aprendí de Ti" became the first ballad in Spanish to reach one billion views on YouTube.

Their first new song in four years, "Fuiste Mía", featuring the Argentine group MYA, was released in February 2021. The single peaked at No. 74 on the Billboard Argentina Hot 100 chart. Due to the COVID-19 pandemic, Ha*Ash stopped performing live for more than one year, then returned to outdoor venues in Mexico in May 2021. In 2021, Ha*Ash contributed a cover version of "The Unforgiven" to The Metallica Blacklist, a compilation of covers of songs from that band's 1991 self-titled album to commemorate its 30th anniversary. Ha*Ash's portion of the proceeds from the song are donated to the Save the Children foundation. Their song "Vencer el Pasado" was used as the theme for the Mexican telenovela Vencer el pasado. Additionally, they worked on film projects such as the Spanish version of Sing 2: ¡Ven y canta de nuevo!.

On March 17, 2022, the group released "Lo Que un Hombre Debería Saber", the lead single from their sixth studio album. The single was accompanied by a video, released on the same day. The song peaked at No. 1 of the Mexican Espanol Airplay and Monitor Latino charts in Mexico. On April 21, the group released the promotional single from the album, titled "Mejor Que Te Acostumbres". The song was announced in a video posted to social media on April 17, 2022. In April 27, it was announced they Ha*Ash would be part to TV Azteca, as coaches the program La Voz... México alongside David Bisbal, Yuridia and Joss Favela. On May 5, the group released "Serías Tú", song is about the strong connection between a mother and daughter. The music video features the band singing the song while scenes show Ha*Ash with a little girl played by Mathilda, the daughter of Hanna.

The news single from the album was "Supongo Que Lo Sabes", released in May 2022, the single was accompanied by a video, released on the same day. "Supongo Que Lo Sabes" has become the group's first single to earn a certification in the United States. In July the group released the song "Si Yo Fuera Tú" and in another single, "Mi Salida Contigo" with Kenia Os, was released in August 2022. On September 1, 2022, Ha*Ash released the sixth studio album Haashtag. To promote the album, the group embarked on a world tour called Gira mi salida contigo from mid 2022 to mid 2023. In November, Ha*Ash has officially released the musical video of "Tenían Razón" and appeared on the Arthur Hanlon album Piano y Mujer II.

In August, 2023 the group released "Te Acuerdas" with Reik.

== Philanthropy ==
In 2005, Ha*Ash opened their home in Louisiana to people who had been displaced by Hurricane Katrina. They also participated in an event for the International Federation of Red Cross and Red Crescent Societies in the United States for the support of victims. In 2007, the duo founded their own charity, Fondo Ha*Ash, which supports immigrants and children suffering from HIV/AIDS. The charity was launched during a concert at the Teatro Metropólitan in Mexico City.

In 2010, Hanna Nicole and Ashley Grace were named ambassadors for the Save the Children Foundation. They recorded the song "Latente" about their experiences when serving with the group in Haiti after the 2010 earthquake. Profits from the song were donated to the foundation. They have since participated in additional foundation efforts after earthquakes in Chiapas and Puebla in Mexico. For their charity efforts, Ha*Ash won the Pro Social Award from Nickelodeon Latin America in 2012. In 2016, Ha*Ash organized the charity drive "Barriga llena, corazón contento" to deliver food to the homeless, and were recognized as "Agents of Change" by the Nickelodeon Mexico.

In September 2017, they participated in the concert to benefit the victims of Hurricane Harvey in Louisiana and Texas, organized by the Michael & Susan Dell Foundation. During a 2018 appearance in Torreón they donated proceeds to the cancer treatment foundation Sonríe... Solo tienes cáncer, and visited local children suffering from the illness. In April 2020, during the ongoing coronavirus outbreak, the duo took part in the Together at Home effort organized by Global Citizen in support of the World Health Organization, in which artists performed live online to encourage people to stay at home and avoid spreading the virus.

== Musical style and influences ==
Ha*Ash's music style has generally been regarded as country, country pop, Latin pop, electropop, funk and pop rock. Ha*Ash's first album was noted by reviewers for its "country and pop" sound that was "delivered particularly well". The band's later albums, such as A Tiempo, 30 de Febrero, Haashtag, included more of a new wave and synth-pop sound, with urban, electropop and mariachi elements. Ha*Ash has expressed appreciation for Shania Twain, Loretta Lynn, Nat King Cole, Garth Brooks, the Chicks and Patsy Cline.

== Band members ==
Current members

- Hanna Nicole – lead vocals, multi-instrumentalist (2002–present)
- Ashley Grace – lead vocals, guitars, keyboards (2002–present)

Current touring members

- Mateo Aguilar – keyboard (2005–2009, 2011–present)
- Ricardo Cortez – drums (2015–present)
- Rodrigo "Oso" Duarte – multi-instrumentalist (2015–present)
- Fernando Ruiz – bass, guitar (2015–present)
- Gerardo "Tito" Ruelas – bass, guitar (2018–present)

Former touring members

- Maximiliano Borghetti Imerito – keyboard (2003–2005)
- Celso Duarte – violin (2003–2007)
- Rodrigo Baills – guitar (2003–2014)
- Rick Jeschke Deliz – guitar (2008–2014)
- Uriel Natenzon – bass (2008–2014)
- Eddy Vega – drums (2008–2014)
- Lary Ruiz – bass, guitar (2015–2017)

== Discography ==
- Ha*Ash (2003)
- Mundos Opuestos (2005)
- Habitación Doble (2008)
- A Tiempo (2011)
- 30 de Febrero (2017)
- Haashtag (2022)
- Haashville (2024)

== Filmography ==
- Igor (2008)
- Sing: Ven y Canta! (2016)
- Sing 2: ¡Ven y canta de nuevo! (2021)

== Tours ==
As headliner

- Ha*Ash Tour (2003–2004)
- Mundos Opuestos Tour (2005–2007)
- Habitación Doble Tour (2008–2010)
- A Tiempo Tour (2011–2013)
- Primera Fila Hecho Realidad Tour (2015–2017)
- Gira 100 años contigo (2018–2022)
- Gira mi salida contigo (2022–2023)

As opening act

- Shakira – The Sun Comes Out World Tour (2011)
- Ricky Martin – One World Tour (2015)
- Alejandro Fernández – Hecho en México (2021)

Promotional tour

- Reventour (with various artists) (2009)
