= Lo Aprendí de Ti =

Single by Ha*Ash

from the album Primera Fila: Hecho Realidad
- Language: Spanish
- English title: "I Learned It From You"
- Released: 6 March 2015
- Recorded: 7 July 2014 in Mexico City, México
- Genre: Acoustic Music; power ballad
- Length: 3:17
- Label: Sony Music Latin
- Songwriters: Ashley Grace Pérez; Hanna Nicole Pérez; José Luis Ortega
- Producers: George Noriega; Tim Mitchell

Ha*Ash singles chronology
"Perdón, Perdón" (2014)	"Lo Aprendí de Ti" (2015)	"Ex de Verdad" (2015)

Music video
- "Lo Aprendí de Ti" on YouTube

"Lo Aprendí de Ti" (transl. "I Learned It From You") is the second single of the live album Primera Fila: Hecho Realidad by American duo Ha*Ash. The single was officially released on March 6, 2015. The music video of the song is the live performance by Ha*Ash in Estudios Churubusco, Mexico City on 7 July 2014. The song then included on their live album Ha*Ash: En Vivo (2019). It was written by Ashley Grace, Hanna Nicole and José Luis Ortega. The music video, become the first YouTube ballad in Spanish to reach one billion views.

== Background and release ==
"Lo Aprendí de ti" was written by Ashley Grace, Hanna Nicole and José Luis Ortega and produced by George Noriega, Tim Mitchell and Pablo De La Loza. It was recorded by Ha*Ash for their live album Primera Fila: Hecho Realidad. It was released as the second single from the album on March 6, 2015, by Sony Music Entertainment.

== Commercial performance ==
The track peaked at number 19 in the Latin Pop Songs, number 32 in the Hot Latin songs and at number 59 in the Latin Airplay charts in the United States. In Mexico, the song peaked at number one on the Mexican Singles Chart and Monitor Latino. In 2017, the song was certified Double Platinum in Mexico. In March 2019, the songs was certified as Triple Platinum in Mexico. On June 24, 2020, the songs was certified as Quadruple Platinum in Mexico.

== Music video ==
The music video for "Lo Aprendí de Ti" was released on March 6, 2015 and was directed by Nahuel Lerena. The video was filmed in Estudios Churubusco, Mexico City. On September 13, 2020, the music video for "Lo Aprendi de Ti", become the first YouTube ballad in Spanish to reach one billion views. As of June 2023, the video has over 1.4 billion views on YouTube.

The second video for "Lo Aprendí de Ti", recorded live for the live album Ha*Ash: En Vivo, was released on December 6, 2019. The video was filmed in Auditorio Nacional, Mexico City. As of June 2023, the video has over 31 million views on YouTube.

A remix video featuring Arthur Hanlon was released on December 2, 2022. As of June 2023, the video has over 9 million views on YouTube.

== Credits and personnel ==
Credits adapted from AllMusic.

Recording and management

- Recording Country: Mexico
- Sony / ATV Discos Music Publishing LLC / Westwood Publishing
- (P) 2014 Sony Music Entertainment US Latin LLC

Ha*Ash

- Ashley Grace – vocals, guitar, songwriting
- Hanna Nicole – vocals, guitar, piano, songwriting

Additional personnel

- Ben Peeler;– Guitarra Lap Steel
- Pablo De La Loza – chorus, co-production
- José Luis Ortega – songwriting
- Paul Forat – A&R. programming, production
- Ezequiel Ghilardi – bass
- Gonzalo Herrerias – A&R
- George Noriega – producer
- Tim Mitchell – producer

== Charts ==
=== Weekly charts ===
Chart	Position
Mexico (Monitor Latino)	1
Mexico (Billboard Mexican Airplay)	7
Mexico (Billboard Espanol Airplay)	1
US Hot Latin Songs (Billboard)	32
US Latin Pop Airplay (Billboard)	19
US Latin Airplay (Billboard)	48

=== Year-end charts ===
Chart (2015)	Position
México (Monitor Latino)	3

== Certifications ==
Region	Certification	Certified units/sales
Mexico (AMPROFON)	Diamond+3× Platinum	480,000^{‡}
^{‡} Sales+streaming figures based on certification alone.

== Awards and nominations ==
Year	Awards ceremony	Award	Results
2015	MTV Millennial Awards	Favorite Song	Nominated
2016	Society Of Authors And Composers Of Mexico	Success SACM	Won
2016	VEVO Certified	100,000,000 views	Won

== Release history ==
Region	Date	Edition(s)	Format	Label	Ref.
Various	March 6, 2015	Standard	Digital download; streaming	Sony Music Latin	
Various	December 6, 2019	Live Version	Digital download; streaming	Sony Music Latin	
