= Perdón, Perdón =

Single by Ha*Ash

from the album Primera Fila: Hecho Realidad
- Language: Spanish
- English title: "Forgiveness, Forgiveness"
- Released: 22 September 2014
- Recorded: 7 July 2014 in Mexico City, México
- Genre: Acoustic Music; power ballad
- Length: 3:46
- Label: Sony Music Latin
- Songwriters: Ashley Grace Pérez; Hanna Nicole Pérez; José Luis Ortega
- Producers: George Noriega; Tim Mitchell

Ha*Ash singles chronology
"Te Voy A Perder" (2013)	"Perdón, Perdón" (2014)	"Lo Aprendí de Ti" (2015)

Music video
- "Perdón, Perdón" on YouTube

"Perdón, Perdón" (transl. "Forgiveness, Forgiveness") is the lead single of the live album Primera Fila: Hecho Realidad by American duo Ha*Ash. The single was officially released on September 22, 2014. The music video of the song is the live performance in Estudios Churubusco, Mexico City, on 7 July 2014. The song then included on their live album Ha*Ash: En Vivo (2019). It was written by Ashley Grace, Hanna Nicole and José Luis Ortega.

== Background and release ==
"Perdón, perdón" was written by Ashley Grace, Hanna Nicole and José Luis Ortega and produced by George Noriega, Tim Mitchell and Pablo De La Loza. It was recorded by Ha*Ash for their live album Primera Fila: Hecho Realidad. It was released as the lead single from the album on September 22, 2014, by Sony Music Entertainment.

== Commercial performance ==
The track peaked at number 17 in the Latin Pop Songs, number 36 in the Hot Latin songs and at number 35 in the Latin Airplay charts in the United States. In Mexico, the song peaked at number one on the Mexican Singles Chart and Monitor Latino. In 2017, it was announced that "Perdón, Perdón" had been certified Triple Platinum. In June 2019, the songs was certified as Quadruple Platinum in Mexico.

== Music video ==
A music video for "Perdón, Perdón" was released on October 27, 2014. It was directed by Nahuel Lerena. The video was filmed in Estudios Churubusco. As of August 2023, the video has over 1 Billon views on YouTube.

The second video for "Perdón, Perdón", recorded live for the live album Ha*Ash: En Vivo, was released on December 6, 2019. The video was filmed in Auditorio Nacional, Mexico City. As of June 2023, the video has over 8 million views on YouTube.

A remix video featuring Mexican group Los Ángeles Azules was released on June 8, 2018. The video was filmed in Convento San Miguel Arcángel, Maní, Yucatán. As of June 2023, the video has over 119 million views on YouTube.

== Credits and personnel ==
Credits adapted from AllMusic.

Recording and management

- Recording Country: México
- Sony / ATV Discos Music Publishing LLC / Westwood Publishing
- (P) 2014 Sony Music Entertainment US Latin LLC

Ha*Ash

- Ashley Grace – vocals, guitar, songwriting
- Hanna Nicole – vocals, guitar, piano, songwriting

Additional personnel

- Pablo De La Loza – chorus, production
- José Luis Ortega – songwriting
- Paul Forat – A&R. programming, production
- Ezequiel Ghilardi – bass
- Gonzalo Herrerias – A&R
- George Noriega – producer
- Tim Mitchell – producer

== Charts ==
Chart (2014–15)	Position
Mexico (Monitor Latino)	1
Mexico (Billboard Mexican Airplay)	2
Mexico (Billboard Espanol Airplay)	1
US Hot Latin Songs (Billboard)	36
US Latin Pop Airplay (Billboard)	17
US Latin Airplay (Billboard)	35

== Certifications ==
Region	Certification	Certified units/sales
Mexico (AMPROFON)	Diamond+2× Platinum+Gold	450,000^{‡}
^{‡} Sales+streaming figures based on certification alone.

== Awards and nominations ==
Year	Awards ceremony	Award	Results
2015	Society Of Authors And Composers Of Mexico	Success SACM	Won
2015	Premios Quiero	Best Music Video	Won
2015	Premios Quiero	Video of the Year	Nominated
2015	VEVO Certified	100,000,000 views	Won
2016	Kids Choice Awards México	Favorite Song	Nominated
2016	MTV Millennial Awards	Favorite Song	Nominated
2016	Premios Juventud	Song The Year	Won

== Release history ==
Region	Date	Edition(s)	Format	Label	Ref.
Various	September 22, 2014	Standard	Digital download; streaming	Sony Music Latin	
Various	November 13, 2015	Big Band Remix	Digital download; streaming	Sony Music Latin	
Various	June 8, 2018	Los Ángeles Azules Remix	Digital download; streaming	Sony Music Latin	
Various	December 6, 2019	Live Version	Digital download; streaming	Sony Music Latin	
