= Estés Donde Estés =

Single by Ha*Ash

from the album Ha*Ash
- Language: Spanish
- English title: "Wherever You Are"
- Released: 2003
- Recorded: 2002–2003
- Genre: Latin pop; country
- Length: 4:01
- Label: Sony Music Latin
- Songwriters: Salvador Rizo; Áureo Baqueiro
- Producer: Áureo Baqueiro

Ha*Ash singles chronology
"Odio Amarte" (2002)	"Estés Donde Estés" (2003)	"Te Quedaste" (2003)

Music video
- "Estés Donde Estés" on YouTube

"Estés Donde Estés" (transl. "Wherever You Are") is a Latin pop song recorded by American duo Ha*Ash. It was first included on Ha*Ash's first studio album Ha*Ash (2003) where it was released as the second single and then included on their live albums Primera Fila: Hecho Realidad (2014) and Ha*Ash: En Vivo (2019).

== Background and release ==
"Estés Donde Estés" was written by Áureo Baqueiro and Salvador Rizo. It serves as the four track to her first studio album Ha*Ash (2003), and then recorded live for his live album Primera Fila: Hecho Realidad in 2014.

== Commercial performance ==
The track peaked at number 14 in the Latin Pop Songs, number 14 in the Hot Latin songs and at number 9 in the Latin Airplay charts in the United States. In Mexico, the song peaked at number 1. In 2003 which manages to place in the top spots on radio stations for that reason it is selected as the main theme of the novel “Clap...el lugar de tus sueños” of Televisa, which with this get wider dissemination of their music.

== Music video ==
A music video for "Estés Donde Estés" was released in 2003. Was published on her YouTube channel on April 24, 2010. As of October 2019, the video has over 11 million views on YouTube

The second music video for "Estés Donde Estés" recorded live for his album A Tiempo edition deluxe (DVD) was released on 2012.

The third music video for "Estés Donde Estés", recorded live for the live album Primera Fila: Hecho Realidad, was released on April 22, 2015. It was directed by Nahuel Lerena. The video was filmed in Estudios Churubusco, City Mexico. As of October 2019, the video has over 55 million views on YouTube.

The four video for "Estés Donde Estés", recorded live for the live album Ha*Ash: En Vivo, was released on December 6, 2019. The video was filmed in Auditorio Nacional, Mexico City.

== Credits and personnel ==
Credits adapted from AllMusic and Genius.

Recording and management

- Recording Country: México
- Sony / ATV Discos Music Publishing LLC / Westwood Publishing
- (P) 2003 Sony Music Entertainment México, S.A. De C.V. (studio version)
- (P) 2014 Sony Music Entertainment México, S.A. De C.V. (live version)

Ha*Ash

- Ashley Grace – vocals, guitar (studio version / live version)
- Hanna Nicole – vocals, guitar (studio version / live version)

Additional personnel

- Áureo Baqueiro – songwriting, recording engineer, arranger, director (studio version)
- Salvador Rizo – songwriting (studio version) / live version)
- Armando Ávila – guitar, acoustic guitar, recording engineer (studio version)
- Rodolfo Cruz – recording engineer (studio version)
- Áureo Baqueiro – songwriting (live version)
- Pablo De La Loza – co-producer, co-director (live version)
- George Noriega – producer (live version)
- Tim Mitchell – producer (live version)

== Charts ==
Chart	Position
Mexico (Monitor Latino)	1
US Hot Latin Songs (Billboard)	14
US Latin Pop Songs (Billboard)	9

== Awards and nominations ==
Year	Awards ceremony	Award	Results
2004	Orgullosamente Latino	Favorite Song	Won

== Release history ==
Region	Date	Edition(s)	Format	Label	Ref.
Various	2003	Standard	Single	Sony Music Latin	
Various	November 11, 2014	Live Version	Digital download; streaming	Sony Music Latin	
Various	December 6, 2019	Live Version	Digital download; streaming	Sony Music Latin	
