= Axel (singer) =

Argentine singer

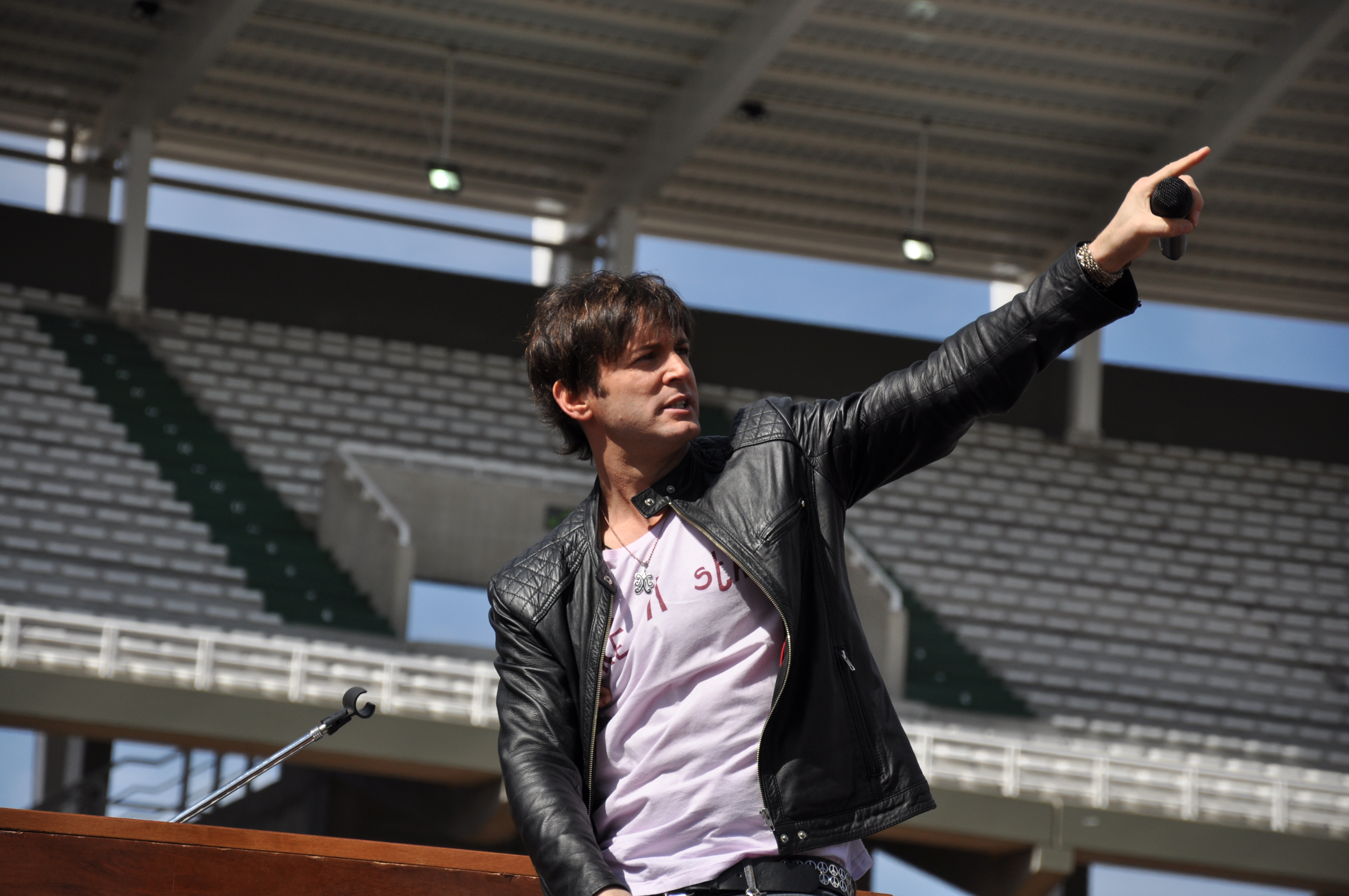
- Axel in 2011.
- Born: Axel Fernando Witteveen; 1 January 1977 (age 49); Rafael Calzada, Argentina
- Occupations: Singer; songwriter
- Years active: 1999–present
- Musical career
- Genres: Latin pop
- Instruments: Vocals; guitar; piano
- Labels: Sony Music, Universal Music

Axel Fernando Witteveen (born 1 January 1977), commonly known as Axel, is an Argentine singer and songwriter.

== Career ==
Axel was born on 1 January 1977 in Rafael Calzada, Buenos Aires province. He began piano lessons with his two brothers, encouraged by his parents, both of whom were great lovers of music. At the age of 8, Axel entered the Conservatory Julian Aguirre of Argentina and remained there until high school when he decided to focus on his studies and temporarily left musical. Once he finished secondary school, at age 17, he resumed his piano studies, determined to make music his livelihood.

Despite the initial opposition of his father, but supported by his mother, Axel started to explore the artistic world of Buenos Aires. His first job was important in a soap opera TV Canal 9, in which he played a small acting role as a waiter in a piano bar.

After going back to his hometown, he worked in the family business for a while, awaiting the next opportunity to pursue his goal. A few months later he was offered a job as a reporter in a youth music program that was broadcast on Canal 26 on cable television. His first interview, Axel said, was with Julio Iglesias. Soon he replaced the presenter of the program. The program offered the opportunity for him to show his skills to the public as a pianist and interpreter. Sony Music Argentina became interested in him, seeing in him all the qualities required for a Latin pop star. In 1999, his debut record was released entitled "La clave para Conquistarte". As a composer, his source of inspiration are his own experiences and mainly those related to love. Despite being young, Axel could convey emotions and feelings through his songs. In 2001, his second studio effort was released, "Mi forma de amar", and the success was bigger than the previous release. In 2003, his third album "Amo" was released with success in Argentina and the rest of Latin America.

Two years later, he published his fourth record "Hoy". The thirteen songs comprising the plate are composed entirely by him and over the themes of love, desamor very intimate and personal stories. The success of this album, which surpassed the record of Platinum by its sales in Argentina and was presented at more than 200 shows, which led to the record what resumed in a Special Edition CD & DVD. This production on the disc in its entirety, plus bonus tracks taken from their live shows at the Teatro Gran Rex, and a DVD with clips, live video and a special how they recorded "Today".

In February 2007, he was presented as international jury at the Festival de Viña del Mar. In mid-May 2008, Axel started making his new album, titled "Universo" that was supposed to feature 14 songs composed by him. The CD production was under the same Axel alongside Juan Blas Caballero, "Universe" was recorded and mixed in the studies "Panda" in Argentina and mastered by Tom Baker (Juanes, Bajofondo, Fergie, etc..) Studies Precision Mastering in Los Angeles. On March 31, and will listen to his new court Celebra la Vida first single from his new record. "Verte Reir", the second single taken off the album, was released in September 2008, peaking #01 in Argentina on the week of September 21. Axel closed the Universe Tour on November 21, 2009, at the sold-out stadium Ferro of Buenos Aires. From this album, Axel received important awards like the Gardel Prize, MTV LA Award as "Best Southern Artist" award 40 Principales (Spain) and the prize "More than a song" (Spain, by Celebra la vida).

On 4 June 2010, Axel released his first DVD named Love Forever containing images of the concerts performed on 25 January 2009 at the Paseo Hermitage of Mar del Plata where over 150,000 people attended, and the concert held on 14 February of that year, where more than 100,000 people attended.

On 6 June 2011, the single "Te voy a amar" was released, which quickly rose to the top of the radio charts in Latin America, first preview of a new sun disc was released on 11 August 2011, and that on the same day of release became certified gold and platinum in Argentina. On 24 October 2011 released their second single "All Back". Axel said goodbye to Buenos Aires with 4 Luna Park, nearly 30,000 viewers and sold out in 4 functions. On 20 January 2012, after a concert for 150,000 people in the Paseo Hermitage of Mar del Plata, as it had done 3 years ago. The 22 March 2012 appears in the Lunario National Auditorium in Mexico, where he had previously exhausted localities, invited on stage to Merche and Noel Schajris. On 4 July of that year, launched the third cut broadcast entitled "todo mi mundo" clip, directed by Claudio Divella and set in the '60s and shows Axel with clothing and hair cut of those years. The second stage of 2012 he made a new Sun Tour with which he toured throughout Latin America, to end the year with a tour in Argentina. He was a coach on Argentina's version of The Voice, La Voz... Argentina.

In 2014, he made an extra special appearance as Axel in the telenovela Mi corazón es tuyo in which he also sings the theme song with girl band Kaay by the hand of the producer Juan Osorio.

== Discography ==
- La clave para conquistarte (1999)
- Mi forma de amar (2001)
- Amo (2003)
- Hoy (2005)
- Universo (2008)
- Un nuevo sol (2011)
- Tus ojos, mis ojos (2014)
- Ser (2017)
- Vuelve (2024)

=== Special editions / compilations ===
- De Punta A Punta: Lo Mejor De Axel (2004)
- Todo mi Universo (2009)

=== DVD ===
- Amor por siempre (2009)
