= Tim Mitchell =

- Born: Timothy C. Mitchell; 5 April 1963 (age 63); Detroit, Michigan
- Genres: Pop; rock; dance; R&B; hip hop; pop rock
- Occupations: Record producer; singer; songwriter; record executive
- Instruments: Vocals; keyboards; guitar; drums
- Years active: 1996–present
- Website: timmitchellmusic.com

Timothy C. Mitchell (born 5 April 1963) is a Grammy winning music record producer, songwriter, and guitarist from Detroit, Michigan.

== Early life ==
Mitchell was born on April 5, 1963, to Dr. David Mitchell and Edith Mitchell (née Clements) at Henry Ford Hospital in Detroit, Michigan, where his father was an orthopedic surgeon. He was the youngest of three children, following sister Peyton and brother David. He grew up in Grosse Pointe Farms, Michigan, and attended Interlochen Arts Academy, an independent high school dedicated to the arts in Interlochen, Michigan. He then went on to graduate from the School of Music at the University of Miami.

== Career ==
=== Bob Seger ===
In 1996, he played and toured in Bob Seger's band and co-wrote three songs with Seger, for his It's a Mystery album: "Lock and Load," "Hands in the Air," and "Revisionism Street."

=== Shakira ===
Introduced to Shakira through Gloria and Emilio Estefan (via their band, Miami Sound Machine) in the late 1990s, Mitchell says he became "instant friends" with the Colombian singer-songwriter, producing her concert special for the MTV Unplugged series in 1999; the album went on to win the Grammy Award for Best Latin Pop Album at the 43rd Grammy Awards. In 2001, Mitchell co-wrote and co-produced the hit song "Whenever, Wherever" ("Suerte" in Spanish markets), the lead single off of Shakira's debut English crossover album Laundry Service (2001); he also produced the live DVD of her Oral Fixation Tour.

In addition to studio collaborations, Mitchell has toured extensively with Shakira, being featured as lead guitarist on every major tour by the singer: the Tour Anfibio (2000), the Tour of the Mongoose (2002-2003), the Oral Fixation Tour (2006-2007), The Sun Comes Out World Tour (2010-2011), the El Dorado World Tour (2018), and the Las Mujeres Ya No Lloran World Tour (2025-2026). The latter tour has been certified as the most successful Latin music tour of all time, having grossed over $421 million as of February 15, 2026.
