= George Noriega =

American songwriter and record producer

- Born: George Noriega; October 24, 1966 (age 58); Miami, Florida, United States
- Genres: Pop, rock, Latin, country
- Occupation(s): Songwriter, record producer
- Years active: 1998–present
- Website: georgenoriega.com

George Noriega (born October 24, 1966) is an American Grammy-winning, Emmy-nominated songwriter and record producer. He is the owner of Cutting Cane Productions and Cutting Cane Publishing, based in Fort Lauderdale, Florida.

Noriega came to prominence in the late 1990s as he helped Latin artists such as Ricky Martin, Shakira and Jennifer Lopez cross over into the English pop music market. He has been a producer and/or songwriter on albums that have sold over 30 million copies worldwide.

== Early life ==
Noriega was born in Miami, Florida to Cuban-American parents who migrated to the United States in 1961 and later moved to Fort Lauderdale, Florida when George was 2 years old. At 15 years of age, he got his first taste of the Rock-n-roll life while drumming for his first band "The Scoundrels" with brothers Jason Christopher and Kenneth John. He later found success as a singer and guitar player with the band "Utrec" alongside brothers Rich and Andy Kwiat, Eddie Mejia and Robert Gomez. They wrote and produced over sixty songs and shared the stage with bands such as Winger, The Guess Who and The Outfield.

He attended the University of Miami as a Jazz Vocal major, and received a bachelor's degree in Music in 1995.

== Career ==
Immediately following graduation, he landed several gigs as a background vocalist for Gloria Estefan, Shakira and Jon Secada. By the end of those tours, George was hired by Estefan Enterprises as a songwriter/producer as part of their "Latin Motown" team.

After being one of the principal Producer/Songwriters at the epicenter of the music industry's "Latin Boom" of 1999-2000 (Ricky Martin, Shakira and J LO) and after seven years of working with the Estefans, in 2005, Noriega decided to venture out on his own. Noriega founded Cutting Cane Productions and continued to work with artists and clients such as: Tony Bennett, Shakira, Maná, Juanes, Alejandro Sanz, Paloma Faith, Ednita Nazario, Dani Martin, Alejandra Guzmán, Nickelodeon, McDonald's, DreamWorks, Sony Music and Universal Music.

For twelve years now Noriega has been working alongside Joel Someillan as part of the production and writing team known as JOLLIPOP ENTERTAINMENT. Jollipop is a children's entertainment production company, which has developed music for Dora the Explorer, Go Diego Go and for many other projects for Nickelodeon. In 2011, Jollipop wrote and produced all the music for Madagascar Live for DreamWorks & Broadway Across America's live stage tour which ended with several sold out shows at Radio City Music Hall in New York.

In 2000, Noriega received a Grammy Award for Best Latin/Tropical Producer for his work on Gloria Estefan's "Alma Caribeña". In 2004 he received a Latin Grammy nomination for Record of the Year as Producer of the darker, sultry, art/pop track "Más Y Más" by Robi Draco Rosa. In 2013, Noriega was honored once again with four more Latin Grammy Award nominations and with a Grammy win for "Album of the Year" for his work as Producer on Draco Rosa's "Vida". And in 2015, George was awarded a Latin Grammy for "Best Pop Album" for Cama Incendiada, an album which he produced for the iconic Mexican Pop/Rock band MANÁ.
