= List of songs recorded by Ha*Ash =

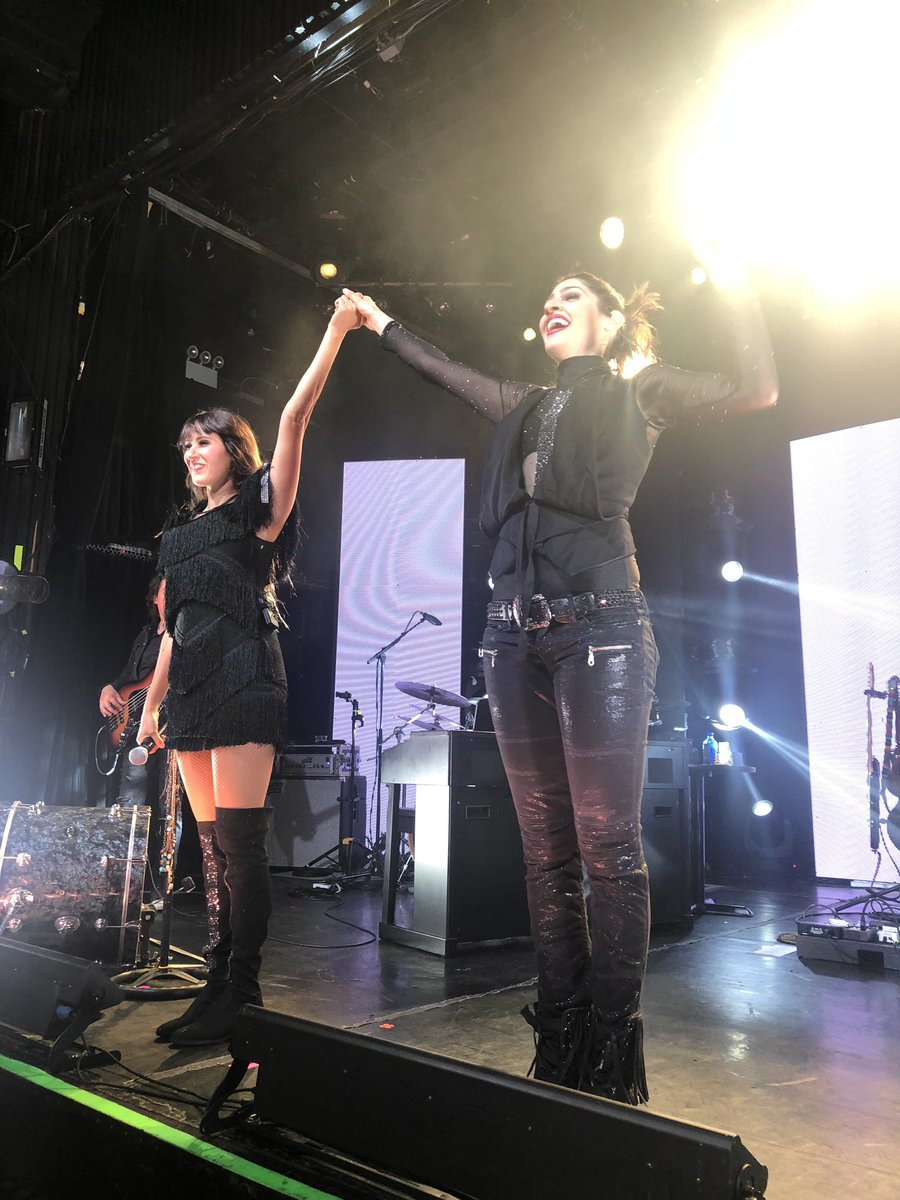
Ha*Ash performs in New York City, United States on the Gira 100 años contigo on October 13, 2018.

American Latin pop duo Ha*Ash has recorded material for seven albums, consisting of 117 songs (97 as a lead artist and 20 as a featured artist). The duet was formed by sisters Ashley Grace and Hanna Nicole. This list includes songs from studio albums, extended play and singles, along with covers, and guest features. This list does not contain live versions or remixes released by the band.

They signed to Sony Music Latin in April 2002, and they recorded their self-titled debut album Ha*Ash in 2003. Many of the songs were written and produced by Áureo Baqueiro. After this, they appeared on Magos y Gigantes Soundtrack contributing to "Un Amigo Así. This was followed by their second album Mundos Opuestos in 2005, was also produced by Áureo Baqueiro. In early 2008, Ha*Ash released the third album, Habitación Doble, featuring a track with the singer Brandi Carlile on the song "Already Home", their first song officially recorded in English. In late 2008, Ha*Ash contributed one song "Cree y Atrévete" to Tinker Bell soundtrack.

On August 19, 2010, they participated in the album tribute for Mecano entitled, Tributo a Ana, José y Nacho, recording a new version of "Mujer Contra Mujer". In 2010, they released the song "Latente" about their experiences in the visit they made to Haiti in August of that year, after the earthquake that hit that country. A Tiempo is the fourth studio album released under the Sony Music Latin label on May 16, 2011. Ha*Ash worked with producer Áureo Baqueiro and Michele Canova. The same year, they participated in the album tribute for Hombres G entitled, En La Playa, recording a new version of "Temblando" with David Summers.

Ha*Ash released their first live album Primera Fila: Hecho Realidad in 2014. The album includes material from her past four studio albums as well as 8 newly recorded songs. Collaborations on the record include "Sé Que Te Vas" featuring Matisse, "No Te Quiero Nada" with Axel, "Quédate Lejos" with Maluma and "Qué Mas Da" with Julio Ramírez and Joy Huerta. The duo's fifth studio album, 30 de Febrero, was released on December 1, 2017. The alum features artists with Prince Royce and Abraham Mateo on the title track. This was followed by their second live album, entitled Ha*Ash: En Vivo, based on a recording from the concert at the Auditorio Nacional in Mexico on November 11, 2018.

== Songs ==
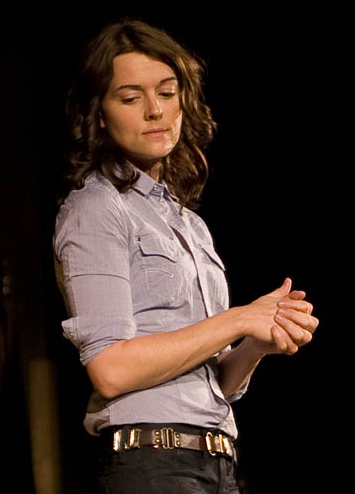
Brandi Carlile collaborated with Ha*Ash on the song "Already Home" from Habitación Doble.

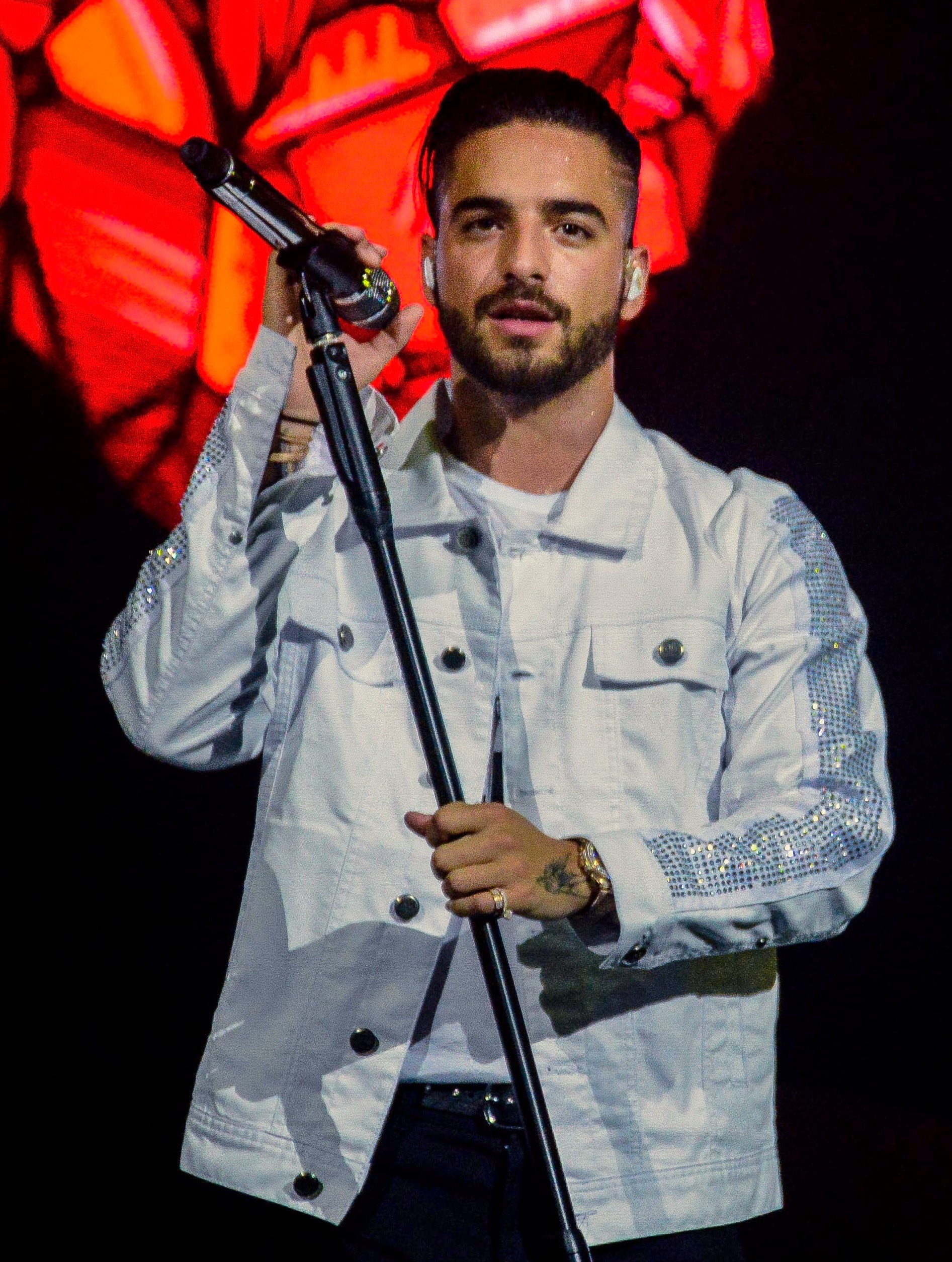
Maluma appeared on "Quédate Lejos" from Primera Fila: Hecho Realidad.

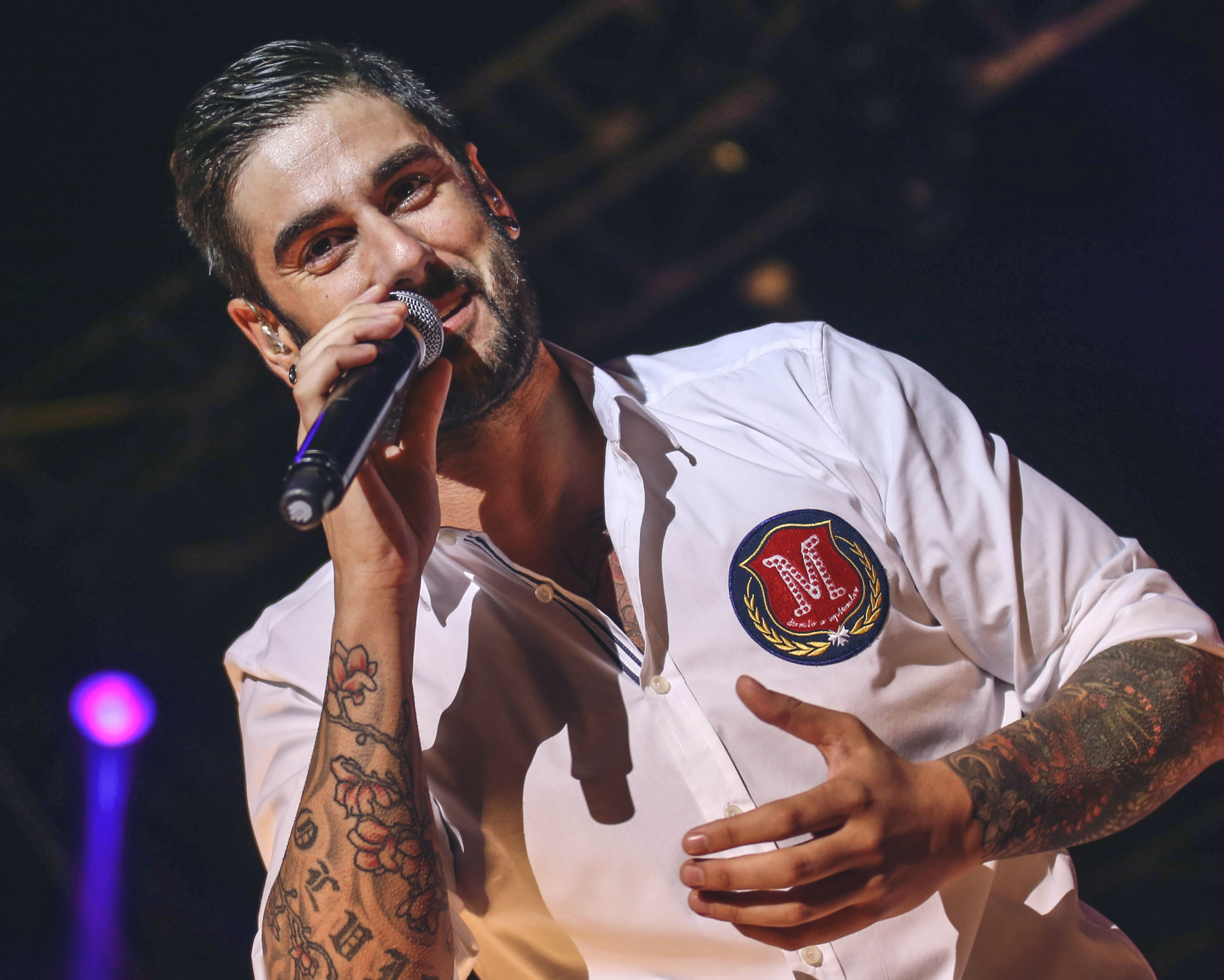
Ha*Ash collaborated with Melendi on "Destino o Casualidad".

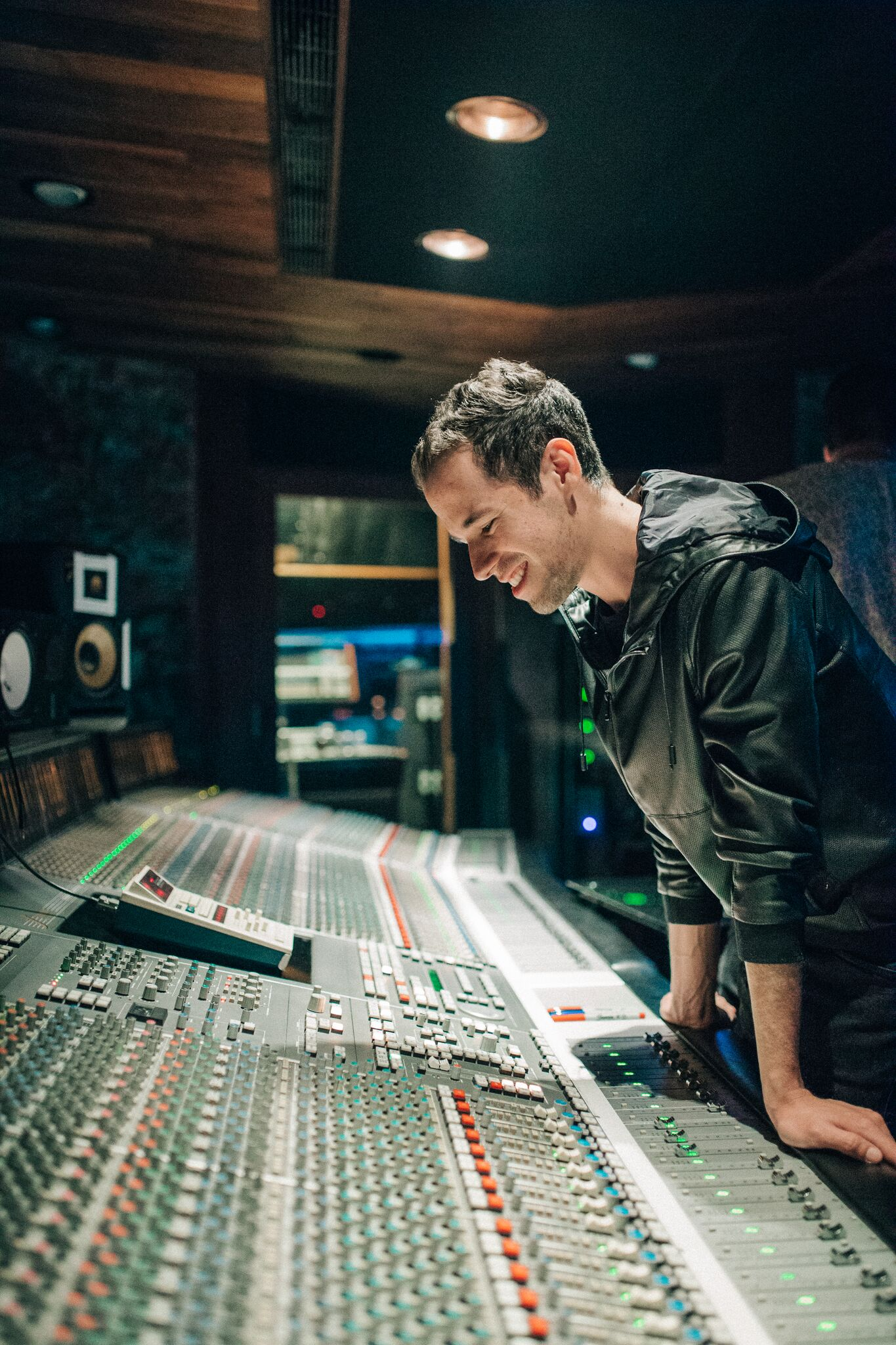
Ha*Ash co-wrote "Eso No Va a Suceder", "No Me Importa" and "Llueve Sobre Mojado" with Edgar Barrera (pictured) for 30 de Febrero (2017).

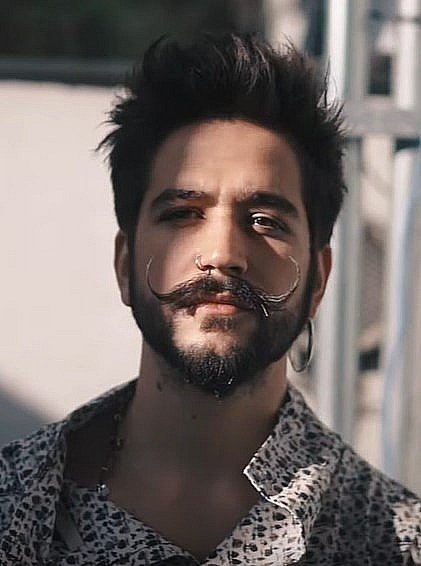
Ha*Ash co-wrote "Paleta" with Camilo Echeverri (pictured) for Ha*Ash's fifth studio album (2017).

Key
†	Indicates song released as a single
‡	Indicates song included on the deluxe version of the album
#	Indicates song released to the soundtrack

Name of song featured performers, writer(s), original album, and year of release
Song	Writer(s)	Original album	Year	Ref.
"30 de Febrero" featuring Abraham Mateo	Ashley Grace Pérez; Hanna Nicole Pérez; Abraham Mateo; Rafael Vergara; Santiago Hernández	30 de Febrero	2017	
"100 Años" † with Prince Royce	Ashley Grace Pérez; Hanna Nicole Pérez; Erika Ender; Geoffrey Royce Rojas; Andy Clay	30 de Febrero	2017	
"A Media Luz"	Bárbara Muñoz; Claudia Brant; Rafael Esparza	Habitación Doble	2008	
"Adelante" † Paty Cantú with Ha*Ash, María León and Rodrigo Dávila	Patricia Cantú; Áureo Baqueiro; Angela Davalos	Non-album single	2012	
"Adiós Amor" (Note: "Adiós Amor" is a 2008 song originally performed by Los Dareyes de la Sierra, associated popularly to Christian Nodal.)	Salvador Garza	Spotify Singles	2018	
"Aléjate de Mi Hermana"	Áureo Baqueiro; Salvador Rizo	Mundos Opuestos	2005	
"Already Home" (Spanish Version)	Ashley Grace Pérez; Hanna Nicole Pérez	Habitación Doble ‡	2008	
"Already Home" featuring Brandi Carlile	Ashley Grace Pérez; Hanna Nicole Pérez; Blair Daly; Troy Verges	Habitación Doble	2008	
"Amor a Medias" †	Áureo Baqueiro; Salvador Rizo	Mundos Opuestos	2005	
"At Last" (Big Band Version) (Note: "At Last" is a 1941 song originally performed by Glenn Miller for the musical film Sun Valley Serenade.)	Mack Gordon; Harry Warren	Primera Fila: Hecho Realidad ‡	2015	
"Aunque No Estés Aquí (Navigate By the Stars)" (Note: "Aunque No Estés Aquí" is the Spanish version of "Navigate By the Stars" songwriting from Thomas Gustafsson, Hanne Sorvaag Hugo Lira and Ian Paolo Lira.)	Hanna Nicole Pérez; Encarnita García; Hugo Lira; Thomas Gustafsson; Hanne Sorvaag; Ian Paolo Lira	Habitación Doble	2008	
"Bridge Over Troubled Water" (Note: "Bridge Over Troubled Water" was originally recorded by Simon & Garfunkel in 1970 for his album Bridge over Troubled Water.) with Arthur Hanlon	Paul Simon	Piano y Mujer II	2022	
"Camina Conmigo" solo or with Río Roma	Claudia Brant; José Luis Ortega	A Tiempo	2011	
"Código Postal"	Carlos de Yarza; Carlos Ponce	Mundos Opuestos ‡	2006	
"Corazón Irrompible"	Ashley Grace Pérez; Hanna Nicole Pérez; Yoel Henríquez	30 de Febrero	2017	
"Cree y Atrévete" (Note: "Cree y Atrévete" is the Spanish version of "Fly to Your Heart" performing by Selena Gomez.)	Ashley Grace Pérez; Hanna Nicole Pérez	Tinker Bell soundtrack #	2008	
"De Dónde Sacas Eso" †	Ashley Grace Pérez; Hanna Nicole Pérez; José Luis Ortega	A Tiempo	2011	
"Deja de Llover"	Áureo Baqueiro	Ha*Ash	2003	
"Demasiado Para Ti"	Ashley Grace Pérez; Hanna Nicole Pérez; Pablo Preciado	Haashtag	2022	
"Destino o Casualidad" † Melendi featuring Ha*Ash	Ramón Melendi	Yo Me Veo Contigo	2017	
"Dos Copas de Más" †	Ashley Grace Pérez; Hanna Nicole Pérez; Pablo Preciado	Primera Fila: Hecho Realidad	2014	
"Eso No Va a Suceder" †	Ashley Grace Pérez; Hanna Nicole Pérez; Edgar Barrera	30 de Febrero	2017	
"Esta Mujer"	Ashley Grace Pérez; Hanna Nicole Pérez; Leonel García	Habitación Doble	2008	
"Estaré" (Note: "Estaré" was originally recorded by Kabah in 1996 for his second studio album La Calle de las Sirenas.) Kabah featuring Ha*Ash	Marco Flores; Héctor Fernando Quijano; Janine Patricia Quijano; Carla García; Sergio Ortiz	El Pop Ha Muerto Viva el Pop	2005	
"Estés Donde Estés"†	Áureo Baqueiro; Salvador Rizo	Ha*Ash	2003	
"Ex de Verdad" †	Ashley Grace Pérez; Hanna Nicole Pérez; Beatriz Luengo; Antonio Rayo	Primera Fila: Hecho Realidad	2014	
"Extraña en La Ciudad"	Áureo Baqueiro; Fernando González; Mónica Vélez	Ha*Ash	2003	
"Extraños"	Ashley Grace Pérez; Hanna Nicole Pérez; Yoel Henríquez	30 de Febrero	2017	
"Faltas Tú"	Áureo Baqueiro	A Tiempo	2011	
"Frente a Frente"	Ashley Grace Pérez; Hanna Nicole Pérez; Rafael Vergara	A Tiempo	2011	
"Fuiste Mía" † MYA with Ha*Ash	Maxi Espindola; Agustín Bernasconi; Esteban Noguera; Andy Clay	TBA	2021	
"Hasta Que Llegaste Tú"	Ashley Grace Pérez; Hanna Nicole Pérez; Rafael Vergara	Habitación Doble	2008	
"Hasta Que Regreses"	Ashley Grace Pérez; Hanna Nicole Pérez	El Regreso de Lucas soundtrack #	2016	
"He Venido a Pedirte Perdón" (Note: "He Venido a Pedirte Perdón" is a 1980 song originally performed by Juan Gabriel.) Víctor García featuring Ha*Ash	Alberto Valadez	Víctor García	2003	
"His Eyes on the Sparrow" (Note: "His Eye Is on the Sparrow" is a song written in 1905 composer by Civilla D. Martin and Charles H. Gabriel, associated with a Ethel Waters who used the title for her autobiography.)	Civilla D. Martin; Charles H. Gabriel	Primera Fila: Hecho Realidad	2014	
«Hoy» Various Artists (Note: Composed of Ha*Ash, Alberto Plaza, Alejandro Sanz, Amaury Gutiérrez, Axel, Beto Cuevas, Diego Torres, Eva Ayllon, Fonseca, Gloria Estefan, Juan Diego Flórez, Juan Luis Guerra, India Martínez, Laura Pausini, Leonel García, Lucho Quequezana, Luis Enrique, Luis Fonsi, Mijares, Noel Schajris, Pandora, Paty Cantú, Reik, Ricardo Montaner, Río Roma, Rosana y Víctor Manuel.)	Gian Marco	Por ti Perú hoy (EP)	2017	
"Hoy No Habrá Mañana"	Ashley Grace Pérez; Hanna Nicole Pérez; Áureo Baqueiro	A Tiempo ‡	2012	
"I Want to Be a Cowboy's Sweetheart" (Note: "I Want To Be A Cowboy's Sweetheart" is a 1935 song originally performed by Patsy Montana.)	Patsy Montana	Non-album single	2003	
"Impermeable" †	Áureo Baqueiro; Daniela Blau	A Tiempo	2011	
"Irremediable"	Ashley Grace Pérez; Hanna Nicole Pérez; Rafael Vergara	A Tiempo	2011	
"Labios Partidos"	Raúl Ornelas; César Lazcano Malo	Habitación Doble ‡	2008	
"Latente"	Ashley Grace Pérez; Hanna Nicole Pérez; Tirzah Huerta	Non-album single	2010	
"Llévate" Kalimba featuring Ha*Ash	Mario Domm; Áureo Baqueiro	Aerosul	2004	
"Llueve Sobre Mojado"	Ashley Grace Pérez; Hanna Nicole Pérez; Edgar Barrera	30 de Febrero	2017	
"Lo Aprendí de Ti" (Note: A version of "Lo Aprendí de Ti" featuring Arthur Hanlon was released in 2022 for his album Piano y Mujer II.) †	Ashley Grace Pérez; Hanna Nicole Pérez; José Luis Ortega	Primera Fila: Hecho Realidad	2014	
"Lo Pasado Pasado" (Note: "Lo Pasado Pasado" was originally recorded by José José in 1978 for his twelfth album Lo Pasado Pasado.) José José featuring Ha*Ash	Alberto Valadez	Duetos, vol 2	2014	
"Lo Que un Hombre Debería Saber" †	Ashley Grace Pérez; Hanna Nicole Pérez; Pablo Preciado; Alejandra Zéguer	Haashtag	2022	
"Lo Que Yo Sé de Ti" †	Ashley Grace Pérez; Hanna Nicole Pérez; Leonel García	Habitación Doble	2008	
"Malas Costumbres (Real Bad Habit)" (Note: "Malas Costumbres" is the Spanish version of "Real Bad Habit" songwriting from Bryan Keith and Don Goodman.)	Ashley Grace Pérez; Hanna Nicole Pérez; Bryan Keith; Don Goodman	Habitación Doble	2008	
"Más Perfecta Que Normal (Hello)"	Ashley Grace Pérez; Hanna Nicole Pérez	Mundos Opuestos	2005	
"Me Entrego a Ti" †	Soraya Lamilla	Mundos Opuestos	2005	
"Me Gustas Tú"	Ashley Grace Pérez; Hanna Nicole Pérez; Andy Clay; Daniel Santacruz	30 de Febrero	2017	
"Me Niego a Olvidarte"	Erika Ender; Rafael Esparza; Ettore Grenci	Habitación Doble ‡	2008	
"Mejor Que Te Acostumbres"	Ashley Grace Pérez; Hanna Nicole Pérez; German Duque Molano; Felipe González Abad	Haashtag	2022	
"Mi Día Favorito"	Ashley Grace Pérez; Hanna Nicole Pérez; Paty Cantú; Stefano Vieni	Haashtag	2022	
"Mi Niña Mujer" (Note: "Mi Niña Mujer" was originally recorded by Los Ángeles Azules in 1996 for his album Cómo Te Voy A Olvidar.)† Los Ángeles Azules featuring Ha*Ash	Jorge Mejia	De Plaza en Plaza	2016	
"Mi Salida Contigo" † Ha*Ash with Kenia Os	Ashley Grace Pérez; Hanna Nicole Pérez; Kenia Flores; Alan Aucedo; Sofía Thompson	Haashtag	2022	
"Milagros de Ocasión"	Áureo Baqueiro	Ha*Ash	2003	
"Mujer Contra Mujer"' (Note: "Mujer Contra Mujer" is a 1990 song originally performed by Mecano.)	José María Cano	Tributo a Ana, José y Nacho	2010	
"No Me importa"	Ashley Grace Pérez; Hanna Nicole Pérez; Edgar Barrera	30 de Febrero	2017	
"No Pasa Nada" †	Ashley Grace Pérez; Hanna Nicole Pérez; José Luis Ortega	30 de Febrero	2017	
"No Soy Yo"	Ashley Grace Pérez; Hanna Nicole Pérez; Leonel García	Primera Fila: Hecho Realidad ‡	2015	
"No Te Puedo Enamorar"	Ashley Grace Pérez; Hanna Nicole Pérez; Áureo Baqueiro; Carla García	Mundos Opuestos	2005	
"No Te Quiero Nada" (Note: A version of "No Te Quiero Nada" featuring Axel was released single in 2015.) †	Áureo Baqueiro	Habitación Doble	2008	
"No Tiene Devolución"	Ashley Grace Pérez; Hanna Nicole Pérez; Julio Ramírez; Tirzah Huerta	Primera Fila: Hecho Realidad	2014	
"Odio Amarte" †	Ashley Grace Pérez; Hanna Nicole Pérez; Áureo Baqueiro	Ha*Ash	2002	
"Ojalá"	Ashley Grace Pérez; Hanna Nicole Pérez; Pablo Preciado	30 de Febrero	2017	
"Paleta"	Ashley Grace Pérez; Hanna Nicole Pérez; Mauricio Reglero; Camilo Echeverri	30 de Febrero	2017	
"Pedazos"	Soraya Lamilla	Primera Fila: Hecho Realidad ‡	2015	
"Perdón, Perdón" (Note: A version of "Perdón, Perdón" with Los Ángeles Azules was released in 2018 for his album Esto Sí Es Cumbia.) †	Ashley Grace Pérez; Hanna Nicole Pérez; José Luis Ortega	Primera Fila: Hecho Realidad	2014	
"Pobre Diabla"	Amerika Jiménez; Jean-Yves G Ducornet; Alejandra Menkarski	Mundos Opuestos	2005	
"Prefiero"	Áureo Baqueiro	Ha*Ash	2003	
"Punto Final"	Ashley Grace Pérez; Hanna Nicole Pérez; Erika Ender; Rafael Esparza	Habitación Doble ‡	2008	
"¿Qué Hago Yo?" †	Soraya Lamilla	Mundos Opuestos	2005	
"Que Haré Con Este Amor"	Alejandra Alberti; Ignacio Morales	A Tiempo	2011	
"Qué Más Da" featuring Joy Huerta and Julio Ramírez	Ashley Grace Pérez; Hanna Nicole Pérez; Julio Ramírez; Tirzah Huerta; Carla García; George Noriega	Primera Fila: Hecho Realidad	2014	
"¿Qué Me Faltó?" †	Ashley Grace Pérez; Hanna Nicole Pérez; José Luis Ortega	30 de Febrero	2017	
"Quédate Conmigo"	Áureo Baqueiro; Fernando González	Mundos Opuestos	2005	
"Quédate Lejos" featuring Maluma	Ashley Grace Pérez; Hanna Nicole Pérez; Pablo Preciado	Primera Fila: Hecho Realidad ‡	2015	
"Resistiré México (Note: "Resistiré México" is the version of "Resistiré" was originally recorded by Dúo Dinámico in 1988.)† Artists for Mexico (Note: Composed of Ha*Ash, Aida Cuevas, Arath Herce, Axel Muñiz, Benny Ibarra, Belinda, Camila, Caztro, Chucho Rivas, Cristian Castro, DLD, Edith Márquez, Gloria Trevi, Horacio Palencia, Kaia Lana, Kinky, Leonel Garcia, Lila Downs, Lupe Esparza, María José, María León, MC Davo, Mijares, Mœnia, Paty Cantú, Río Roma, Rodrigo Davila, Sandra Echeverria, Ximena Sariñana and Yahir.)	Carlos Toro Montoro; Manuel de la Calva Diego	Non-album single	2020	
"Rosas en Mi Almohada" María José featuring Ha*Ash	Ashley Grace Pérez; Hanna Nicole Pérez; Encarnita García	Conexión	2019	
"Sé Que Te Vas" † solo or featuring Matisse	Ashley Grace Pérez; Hanna Nicole Pérez; Pablo Preciado	Primera Fila: Hecho Realidad	2014	
"Serías Tú"	Ashley Grace Pérez; Hanna Nicole Pérez; Pablo Preciado; Alejandra Zéguer	Haashtag	2022	
"Si Pruebas una Vez (Sin Ti Me Vuelvo Loca)" †	Ángela Dávalos; J.L. Querubin	Ha*Ash	2003	
"Si Tú No Vuelves" (Note: "Si Tú No Vuelves" was originally recorded by Miguel Bosé in 1992 for his twelfth album Bajo el signo de Caín.) † featuring Miguel Bosé	Miguel Bosé; Massimo Grilli; Lanfranco Ferrario	Ha*Ash: En Vivo	2019	
"Si Tú Quieres Ser"	Ashley Grace Pérez; Hanna Nicole Pérez; Áureo Baqueiro	Mundos Opuestos	2005	
"Si Yo Fuera Tú"	Ashley Grace Pérez; Hanna Nicole Pérez; Pablo Preciado; Alejandra Zéguer; Edgar Barrera	Haashtag	2022	
"Solo una Vez" (Note: "Solo una Vez" is a 2001 song originally performed by Sergio Dalma.)	Jorge Ballesteros; Britti Alessandro	A Tiempo	2011	
"Soy Mujer" †	Áureo Baqueiro	Ha*Ash	2003	
"Subiré al Infierno" Cumbia Ninja featuring Ha*Ash	Sebastián Gelos; Christian Miler	Cumbia Ninja 2	2014	
"Superficial"	Ashley Grace Pérez; Hanna Nicole Pérez; Mónica Vélez; Áureo Baqueiro	Ha*Ash	2003	
"Supongo Que Lo Sabes" †	Ashley Grace; Hanna Nicole; José Luis Ortega	Haashtag	2022	
"Tan Lejos" Melocos featuring Ha*Ash	Manuel Jurado Quijano	Somos	2009	
"Te Acuerdas" Ha*Ash with Reik	Ashley Grace; Hanna Nicole; Pablo Preciado	TBA	2023	
"Te Amaré Más Allá" Cristian Castro featuring Ha*Ash	Adrian Pieragostino; Luis Carlos Monroy	Primera Fila - Día 1	2013	
"Te Amo Más Que Ayer"	Ashley Grace Pérez; Hanna Nicole Pérez; Yoel Henríquez; Mauricio Gasca	A Tiempo	2011	
"Te Aprovechas" Alicia Villarreal with Ha*Ash	Jorge Macias	La Villarreal	2017	
"Te Dejo en Libertad" (Note: A version of "Te Dejo En Libertad" featuring Maldita Nerea was released promotional single in 2016. The song only appears on the Latin and Europe edition of Primera Fila: Hecho Realidad.) †	Ashley Grace Pérez; Hanna Nicole Pérez; José Luis Ortega	A Tiempo	2011	
"Te Dejo"	Gian Marco	Habitación Doble	2008	
"Te Lo Dije"	Ashley Grace Pérez; Hanna Nicole Pérez; Pablo Preciado	Haashtag	2022	
"Te Mueves Tú, Se Mueven Todos" David Bisbal featuring Ha*Ash and Reik	Unknown (Note: "Writing credits for this song have not been confirmed.)	Non-album single	2014	
"Te Quedaste" †	Áureo Baqueiro; Leonel García	Ha*Ash	2003	
"Te Voy A Perder" (Note: "Te Voy A Perder" is an original song written and composed by Leonel García and Áureo Baqueiro; first recorded by Alejandro Fernández in 2007.) † Leonel García featuring Ha*Ash	Leonel García; Áureo Baqueiro	Todas Mías	2013	
"Temblando" (Note: "Temblando" was originally recorded by Hombres G in 1987 for his third studio album Estamos locos... ¿o qué?.) Hombres G featuring Ha*Ash	David Summers	En La Playa	2011	
"Tenían Razón"	Ashley Grace Pérez; Hanna Nicole Pérez; Pablo Preciado; Alejandra Zéguer	Haashtag	2022	
"Todo No Fue Suficiente" †	Ashley Grace Pérez; Hanna Nicole Pérez; Yoel Henríquez	A Tiempo	2011	
"Tu Mirada en Mi" †	Ashley Grace Pérez; Hanna Nicole Pérez; Áureo Baqueiro; Salvador Rizo; Gian Marco	Habitación Doble	2005	
"Tú y Yo Volvemos al Amor" (Note: "Tú y Yo Volvemos al Amor" is a 1998 song originally performed by Mónica Naranjo.) †	Cristóbal Sánsano; Mónica Naranjo	Habitación Doble	2008	
"Un Amigo Así"	Áureo Baqueiro	La Magia Está en ti #	2003	
"Un Beso Tuyo"	Ashley Grace Pérez; Hanna Nicole Pérez; Áureo Baqueiro	A Tiempo ‡	2012	
"The Unforgiven" (Note: "The Unforgiven" is the Spanish version was originally recorded by Metallica in 1991 for his fifth homonymous album.)	James Hetfield; Lars Ulrich; Kirk Hammett	The Metallica Blacklist	2021	
"Vamos a Llamarlo Amor"	Áureo Baqueiro; Salvador Rizo	Habitación Doble	2008	
"Vaquera (I Want to Be a Cowboy's Sweet Heart)" (Note: "Vaquera" is the Spanish version of "I Want to Be a Cowboy's Sweetheart".)	Ashley Grace Pérez; Hanna Nicole Pérez	Mundos Opuestos	2005	
"Vencer el Pasado"	Mauricio Arriaga; Jorge Eduardo Murguía	Vencer el pasado soundtrack #	2021	
"We Are Going to Make It Tonight (Outro Jam)" with Arthur Hanlon, Debi Nova, Ivy Queen, Lupita Infante & Catalina García	Arthur Hanlon	Piano y Mujer II	2022	
"Ya No" with Kalimba	Áureo Baqueiro	Mundos Opuestos	2005	
"Yo Nunca Nunca"	Ashley Grace Pérez; Hanna Nicole Pérez; Raquel Sofía; Stefano Vieni	Haashtag	2022	

== Unreleased songs ==
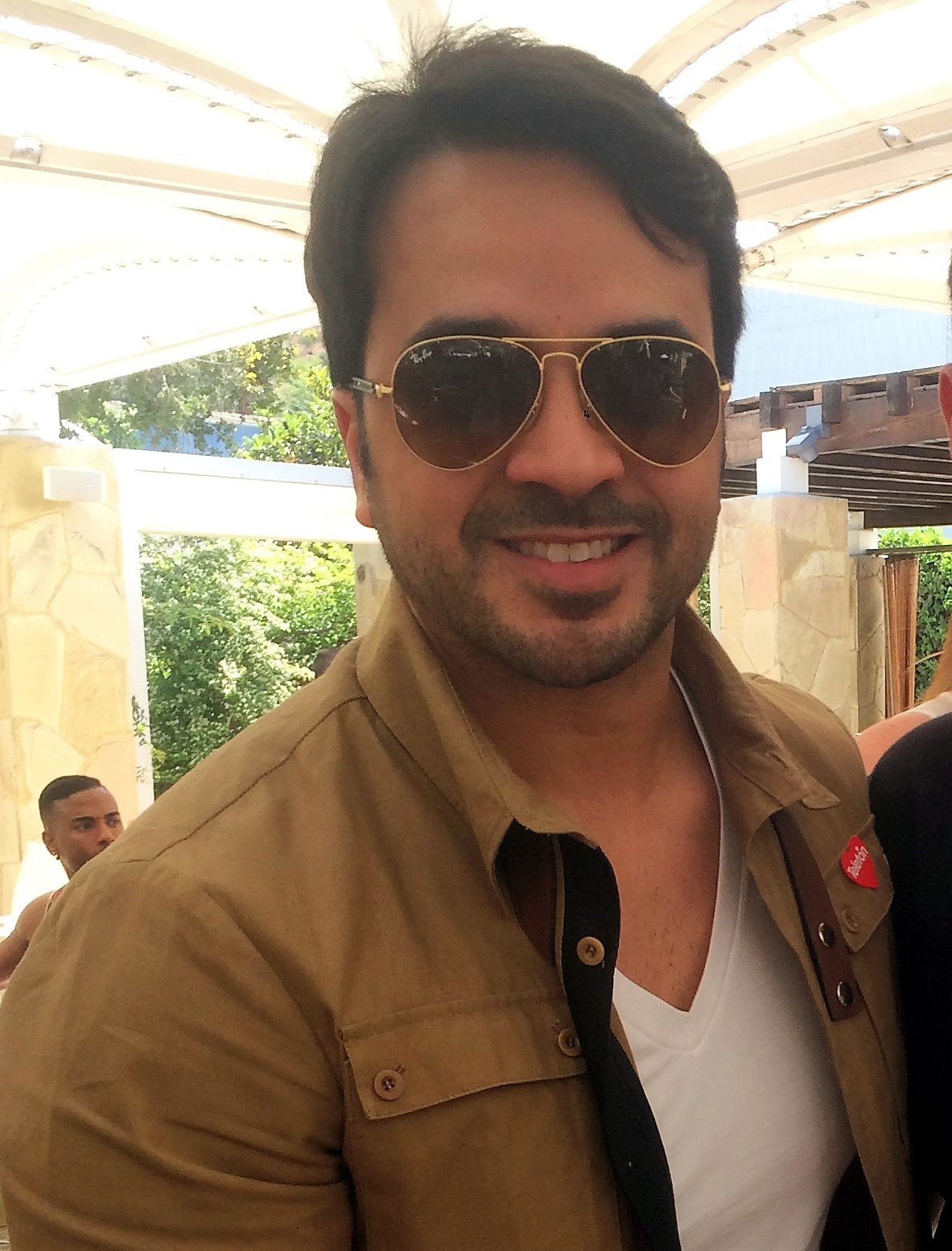
Luis Fonsi co-wrote the unreleased song "Tus Manos No Eran Mías".

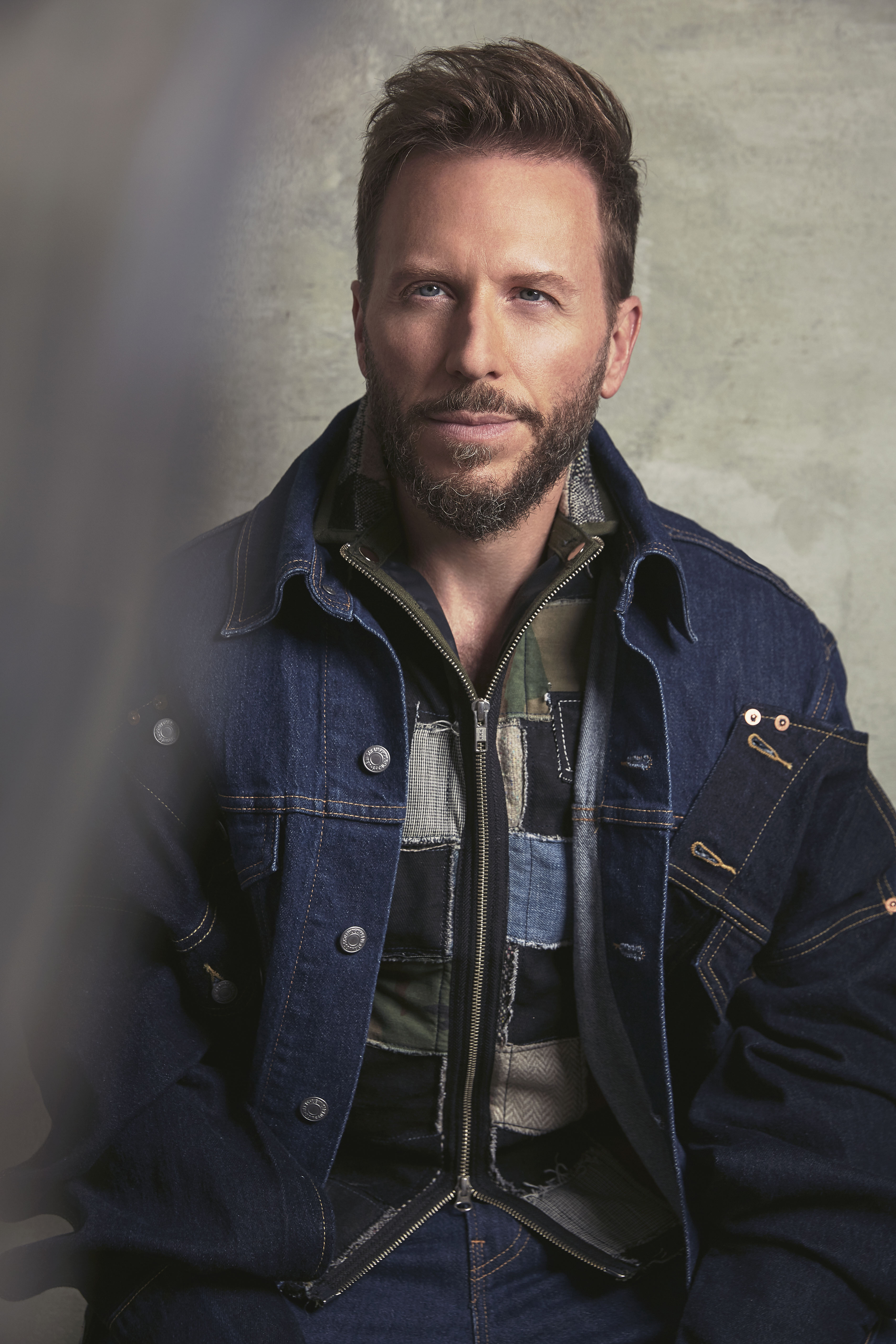
Noel Schajris co-wrote the unreleased songs "Alguna Vez" and "Contigo es Mejor".

List of unreleased songs, showing notes about them
Song	Note	Ref.
"Alguna Vez"	Written by Ashley Grace Pérez, Hanna Nicole Pérez and Nahuel Schajris; Registered with the American Society of Composers, Authors and Publishers (ASCAP); Registered artist on Society of Authors and Composers of Mexico (SACM).	
"Amazing Grace"	Written by John Newton.; Registered with the Society of Authors and Composers of Mexico (SACM); Performed by Ha*Ash in 2015.	
"Amigos Para Que"	Written by Ashley Grace Pérez, Hanna Nicole Pérez, Yoel Henríquez; Registered at ASCAP and SACM	
"Amor Vencido"	Written by Ashley Grace Pérez, Hanna Nicole Pérez, Yoel Henríquez and Rafael Vergara; Registered at ASCAP and SACM	
"Apostemos al Amor"	Written by Ashley Grace Pérez, Hanna Nicole Pérez, Erika Ender and Rafael Esparza; Registered at ASCAP and SACM	
"Bésame Ahora"	Written by Ashley Grace Pérez and Hanna Nicole Pérez; Registered at ASCAP and SACM	
"Cartas Del Retiro"	Written by Hanna Nicole Pérez; Registered at ASCAP and SACM	
"Cerca De Mi"	Written by Ashley Grace Pérez and Hanna Nicole Pérez; Registered at ASCAP and SACM	
"Contigo es Mejor"	Written by Ashley Grace Pérez, Hanna Nicole Pérez and Nahuel Schajris; Registered at ASCAP and SACM	
"Curitas"	Written by Ashley Grace Pérez, Hanna Nicole Pérez, Raquel Sofía and Stefano Vieni; Registered at ASCAP and SACM	
"Demasiado Tarde"	Written by Ashley Grace Pérez and Hanna Nicole Pérez; Registered at ASCAP and SACM	
"Derechito Aquí"	Written by Ashley Grace Pérez, Hanna Nicole Pérez, Sergio Ortiz, Carla García; Registered at ASCAP and SACM	
"Diez De La Mañana"	Written by Ashley Grace Pérez, Hanna Nicole Pérez and Ángela Dávalos; Registered at ASCAP and SACM	
"Don't Walk Away"	Written by Ashley Grace Pérez, Hanna Nicole Pérez and James Cornelius; Registered at ASCAP and SACM	
"Esta Guerra"	Written by César Miranda López.; Registered at ASCAP	
"Esta Noche"	Written by Ashley Grace Pérez, Hanna Nicole Pérez and Rafael Vergara; Registered at ASCAP and SACM	
"Ganas De Volver"	Written by Ashley Grace Pérez, Hanna Nicole Pérez and Rafael Esparza; Registered at ASCAP and SACM	
"Grita el Silencio"	Written by Ashley Grace Pérez, Hanna Nicole Pérez, Tirzah Huerta and Mario Sandoval; Registered at ASCAP and SACM	
"Heartbreaker Tonight"	Written by Ashley Grace Pérez, Hanna Nicole Pérez and Christopher Tompkins; Registered at ASCAP and SACM	
"Indecisión"	Written by Written by Hanna Nicole Pérez; Registered at ASCAP and SACM	
"Lágrimas en La Lluvia"	Written by Ashley Grace Pérez, Hanna Nicole Pérez and Jorge Luis Piloto	
"Las Reglas Las Pongo Yo"	Written by Ashley Grace Pérez and Hanna Nicole Pérez; Registered at ASCAP and SACM	
"Leit It Be Her Tonight"	Written by Ashley Grace Pérez, Hanna Nicole Pérez and George Dean; Registered at ASCAP and SACM	
"Libre"	Written by Hanna Nicole Pérez; Registered at ASCAP and SACM	
"Living The Dream"	Written by Ashley Grace Pérez, Hanna Nicole Pérez and Kile Mathews; Registered at ASCAP and SACM	
"Me He Enamora De Ti"	Written by Ashley Grace Pérez, Hanna Nicole Pérez and Claudia Menkarski; Registered at ASCAP and SACM	
"Mi Propia Historia De Amor"	Written by Ashley Grace Pérez, Hanna Nicole Pérez and Leonel García; Registered at ASCAP and SACM	
"No Olvidarás Que Te Olvide"	Written by Hanna Nicole Pérez and Mario Sandoval; Registered at ASCAP and SACM	
"No Pierdas Tiempo"	Written by Ashley Grace Pérez, Hanna Nicole Pérez and Yoel Henríquez; Registered at ASCAP and SACM	
"Nunca Te Vas"	Written by Ashley Grace Pérez, Hanna Nicole Pérez and José Luis Ortega; Registered at ASCAP and SACM	
"Ole Ole"	Written by Hanna Nicole Pérez and Mariano Castrejon; Registered at ASCAP and SACM	
"Para Nada"	Written by Ashley Grace Pérez, Hanna Nicole Pérez and Claudia Brant; Registered at ASCAP and SACM	
"Que Sin Ti"	Written by Hanna Nicole Pérez and Eduardo Moreno; Registered at ASCAP and SACM	
"Será Verdad"	Written by Ashley Grace Pérez, Hanna Nicole Pérez, Paty Cantú and Stefano Vieni; Registered at ASCAP and SACM	
"Siempre"	Written by Hanna Nicole Pérez and Fernando Osorio; Registered at ASCAP and SACM	
"Siente el Ritmo"	Written by Ashley Grace Pérez, Hanna Nicole Pérez and Ernesto Montero; Registered at ASCAP and SACM	
"Tal Vez No Fue Así"	Written by Hanna Nicole Pérez; Registered at ASCAP and SACM	
"Tal Vez Sea Tarde"	Written by Ashley Grace Pérez and Hanna Nicole Pérez; Registered at ASCAP and SACM	
"Te Amo"	Written by Hanna Nicole Pérez; Registered at ASCAP and SACM	
"Te Toco Perder"	Written by Hanna Nicole Pérez and Mario Sandoval; Registered at ASCAP and SACM	
"Tu Estás Aquí"	Written by Hanna Nicole Pérez; Registered at ASCAP and SACM	
"Trece Veinte"	Written by Ashley Grace Pérez, Hanna Nicole Pérez, Raquel Sofía and Stefano Vieni; Registered at ASCAP and SACM	
"Tu Mejor Debilidad"	Written by Ashley Grace Pérez, Hanna Nicole Pérez and Leonel García; Registered at ASCAP and SACM	
"Tú Te Lo Pierdes"	Written by Ashley Grace Pérez, Hanna Nicole Pérez and Yoel Henríquez; Registered at ASCAP and SACM	
"Tu y Yo"	Written by Ashley Grace Pérez, Hanna Nicole Pérez and Juan Carlos; Registered at ASCAP and SACM	
"Tus Manos No Eran Mías"	Written by Ashley Grace Pérez, Hanna Nicole Pérez and Luis Rodríguez; Registered at ASCAP and SACM	
"Unilateral"	Written by Ashley Grace Pérez, Hanna Nicole Pérez and Rafael Esparza; Registered at ASCAP and SACM	
"Ven a Mí"	Written by Hanna Nicole Pérez; Registered at ASCAP and SACM	
"Vete"	Written by Hanna Nicole Pérez and Eduardo Moreno; Registered at ASCAP and SACM	

== Songwriting credits ==
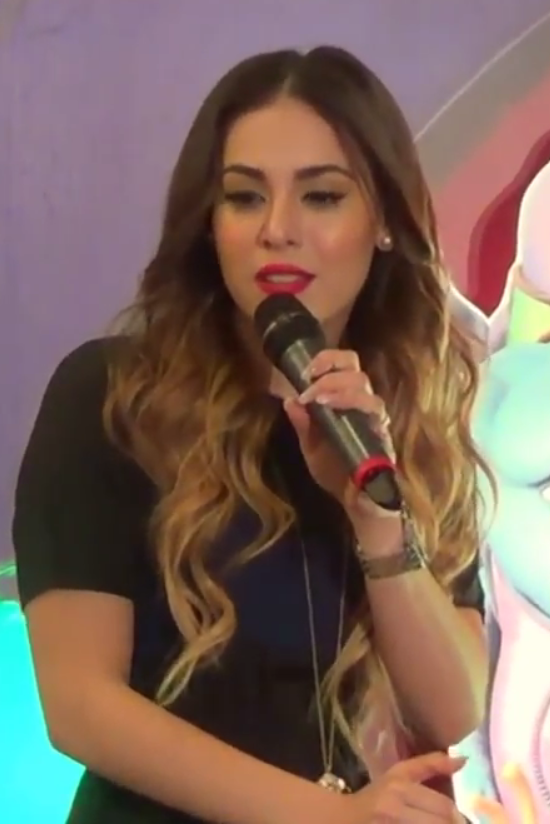
Alongside Pablo Preciado, Ha*Ash co-wrote "Más Que Amigos" for the Danna Paola' (pictured) fourth studio album (2012).

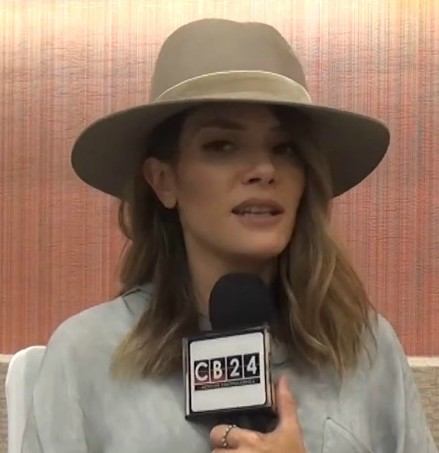
Ha*Ash co-wrote "Rosas en Mi Almohada" with Kany García (pictured) for María José's first live album (2019).

Key
‡	Indicates songs written by Hanna Nicole Pérez alone or with others
≠	Indicates songs written by Ashley Grace Pérez alone or with others

Songs written by Ha*Ash, with original artists and originating album, showing year released.
Title	Artist(s)	Originating album	Year	Credits	Ref.
"8 y Un Café"	—	—	Unreleased	Writer	
"180 Degrees"	—	—	Unreleased	Writers	
"14 Paredes"	—	—	Unreleased	Writer	
"A Paso Lento"	Diana Reyes	Ámame, Bésame	2010	Writers	
"A Tus Pies"	Ana Torroja	Conexión	2015	Co-writers	
"Algo Más"	—	—	Unreleased	Co-writers	
"Amor Intermitente"	—	—	Unreleased	Co-writers	
"Aún Te Siento"	—	—	Unreleased	Writer	
"Broken"	—	—	Unreleased	Co-writers	
"Catorce Paredes"	—	—	Unreleased	Co-writers	
"Comienza en Mi"	—	—	Unreleased	Co-writer	
"Dime"	—	—	Unreleased	Co-writer	
"Envuelta Por el Mar"	—	—	Unreleased	Co-writer	
"Estaré"	—	—	Unreleased	Co-writer	
"He Prefers Blondes"	—	—	Unreleased	Co-writer	
"I Got It"	—	—	Unreleased	Co-writer	
"It Doesn't Feel That Way To Me"	—	—	Unreleased	Co-writer	
"Manos Arriba"	—	—	Unreleased	Co-writer	
"Más Que Amigos"	Danna Paola	Danna Paola	2012	Co-writer	
"Me Voy"	—	—	Unreleased	Co-writer	
"Mexican Lover"	—	—	Unreleased	Writer	
"Mirar y No Tocar"	—	—	Unreleased	Co-writer	
"Miss Me A Little More"	—	—	Unreleased	Writer	
"Moon"	—	—	Unreleased	Co-writer	
"Muévelo"	—	—	Unreleased	Co-writer	
"New Girl In Town"	—	—	Unreleased	Co-writer	
"No Extrañaré"	—	—	Unreleased	Co-writer	
"No Te Enamores"	—	—	Unreleased	Co-writer	
"Nobody Gotta Know"	—	—	Unreleased	Co-writer	
"One Sided Love"	—	—	Unreleased	Writers	
"Otra Vez"	—	—	Unreleased	Co-writer	
"Pensé"	Grupo Play	Días Que No Vuelven	2006	Co-writer	
"Puede El Cielo"	—	—	Unreleased	Co-writer	
"Rosas en Mi Almohada"	María José feat. Ha*Ash	Conexión	2019	Co-writer	
"Run"	—	—	Unreleased	Co-writer	
"Second Hand Heart"	—	—	Unreleased	Co-writer	
"Someone Else"	—	—	Unreleased	Co-writer	
"Still In Love With Him"	—	—	Unreleased	Writers	
"Straight Tequila Tonight"	—	—	Unreleased	Co-writer	
"The Last Dance"	—	—	Unreleased	Co-writer	
"The New Girl In Town"	—	—	Unreleased	Co-writer	
"The Trouble With Hello"	—	—	Unreleased	Co-writer	
"Tonto Corazón"	—	—	Unreleased	Co-writer	
"Vamos Te Llevo Lejos"	—	—	Unreleased	Co-writer	

== See also ==
- Ha*Ash discography
