= Haashtag =

2022 studio album by Ha*Ash

Studio album by Ha*Ash
- Released: 1 September 2022
- Studio: Cutting Cane Studios (Florida)
- Genre: Latin pop; power ballad
- Length: 32:25
- Language: Spanish
- Label: Sony Music Latin
- Producer: Hanna Nicole (co.); George Noriega; Sebastian Krys; Julio Reyes

Ha*Ash chronology
| Ha*Ash: En Vivo (2019) | Haashtag (2022) |

Ha*Ash studio album chronology
| 30 de Febrero (2017) | Haashtag (2022) |

Singles from Haashtag
- 1. "Lo Que un Hombre Debería Saber" Released: 17 March 2022; 2. "Supongo Que Lo Sabes" Released: 19 May 2022; 3. "Mi Salida Contigo" Released: 29 August 2022

Haashtag is the sixth studio album by American Latin pop duo Ha*Ash, released on 1 September 2022. The album features artist Kenia Os. Ha*Ash assumed an integral role in the album's production and collaborated with producers including George Noriega, Sebastián Krys and Julio Reyes.

The album was preceded by the release of tree singles. The first, "Lo Que un Hombre Debería Saber" was 17 March 2022. In November 2017, the second single, "Supongo Que Lo Sabes", was released in May 2022 and third single released were, "Mi Salida Contigo" featuring Kenia Os was released in August 2022. Ha*Ash released others four music video: "Mejor Que Te Acostumbres", "Serías Tú", "Si Yo Fuera Tú" and "Tenían Razón".

To promote the album, the band embarked on Gira Mi Salida Contigo, which began at Puebla on 2 September 2022.

== Background and production ==
The new album was announced in May 2020. Haashtag is a primarily a pop sound, urban, mariachi, and country-pop rhythm, consisting mainly of stripped down instruments such as the piano and acoustic guitar. According to Hanna, the group recorded the album at home in Houston during the COVID-19 lockdown. In February 2021, their first new song in four years, "Fuiste Mía", featuring the Argentine group MYA, was released in February 2021. Ha*Ash assumed an integral role in the album's production and collaborated with producers including George Noriega, Sebastián Krys and Julio Reyes.

== Release and promotion ==
It is the band's first studio album in five years, after of their previous album, 30 de Febrero (2017). In Mexico, the standard edition CD of the album was released on 1 September 2022, under the Sony Music Latin label.

=== Singles ===
The first single from the album was "Lo Que un Hombre Debería Saber"; released on March 17, 2022. The single was accompanied by a video, released on the same day. The track peaked at number 24 in the Latin Pop Songs charts in the United States. In Mexico, the song peaked at No. 1 of the Mexican Espanol Airplay and Monitor Latino charts in Mexico. "Lo Que un Hombre Debería Saber" was certified gold in Mexico.

The second single from the album was "Supongo Que Lo Sabes", released in May 2022, the single was accompanied by a video, released on the same day. The clip was recorded in The Filmore Miami Beach, Florida. The track peaked at number 19 in the Latin Pop Songs charts in the United States. In Mexico, the song peaked at No. 1 of the Monitor Latino charts in Mexico. "Supongo Que Lo Sabes" has become the group's first single to earn a certification in the United States.

On 29 August 2022, they released the third single from the album, "Mi Salida Contigo" with Kenia Os. The track peaked at number 19 in the Latin Pop Songs charts in the United States. In Mexico, the song peaked at No. 1 of the Monitor Latino charts in Mexico. The single was certified gold in Mexico.

=== Other songs ===
On April 21, the group released the promotional single from the album, titled "Mejor Que Te Acostumbres". The song was announced in a video posted to social media on April 17, 2022. On May 5, the group released "Serías Tú", song is about the strong connection between a mother and daughter. The music video features the band singing the song while scenes show Ha*Ash with a little girl played by Mathilda, the daughter of Hanna. In July the group released the song "Si Yo Fuera Tú" accompanied by a video, released on the same day. In November, Ha*Ash has officially released the musical video of "Tenían Razón".

=== Tour ===
To promote the album, the group embarked on a world tour called "Gira mi salida contigo" from mid-2022 to 2023.

== Track listing ==
Standard edition
| No. | Title | Writer(s) | Producer(s) | Length |
|---|---|---|---|---|
| 1. | "Lo Que un Hombre Debería Saber" | Ashley Grace; Hanna Nicole; Alejandra Zéguer; Pablo Preciado | Hanna Nicole^{[a]}; George Noriega | 3:14 |
| 2. | "Si Yo Fuera Tú" | Ashley; Hanna; Zéguer; Preciado | Hanna^{[a]}; Sebastián Krys | 3:27 |
| 3. | "Supongo Que Lo Sabes" | Ashley; Hanna; José Luis Ortega | Hanna^{[a]}; Noriega | 3:56 |
| 4. | "Mi Salida Contigo" (with Kenia Os) | Ashley; Hanna; Kenia Flores; Edgar Barrera; Alan Saucedo; Sofia Thompson | Hanna^{[a]}; Noriega | 2:55 |
| 5. | "Tenían Razón" | Ashley; Hanna; Zéguer; Preciado | Hanna^{[a]}; Krys | 3:13 |
| 6. | "Mejor Que te Acostumbres" | Ashley; Hanna; German Duque; Felipe González Abad | Hanna^{[a]}; Noriega | 3:13 |
| 7. | "Te Lo Dije" | Ashley; Hanna; Preciado | Hanna^{[a]}; Julio Reyes | 3:12 |
| 8. | "Yo Nunca Nunca" | Ashley; Hanna; Raquel Sofía; Stefano Vieni | Hanna^{[a]}; Noriega | 2:53 |
| 9. | "Demasiado Para Ti" | Ashley; Hanna; Preciado | Hanna^{[a]}; Noriega | 3:08 |
| 10. | "Mi Día Favorito" | Ashley; Hanna; Patricia Cantú; Vieni | Hanna^{[a]}; Noriega | 3:32 |
| 11. | "Serías Tú" | Ashley; Hanna; Zéguer; Preciado | Hanna^{[a]}; eyes | 3:26 |
| Total length: | | | | 32:25 |

Notes

- ^{^[a]} signifies a co-producer

== Credits and personnel ==
Credits adapted from the album's liner notes.

=== Musicians ===
- Ashley Grace: vocals (all tracks)
- Hanna Nicole: vocals (all tracks)
- Kenia Os: vocals (4)
- Jean Rodríguez: background vocals (1, 3, 6)
- Pete Wallace: keyboards (1, 3–4, 6, 8–10)
- Doug Emery: keyboards (2)
- Camilo Velandia: guitar (1, 3–5, 6, 8–10), banjo (4, 8–10)
- David Levita: guitar (2)
- Pablo De La Loza: bass (1)
- Davey Farragher: bass (2)
- George Noriega: bass (3–4)
- Lee Levin: drums (1–3)
- Matt Calderín: drums (1–6)
- Juan Camilo Escorcia : accordion (4)
- Julie Almonte: trumpet (6)
- Daniel Uribe: guitar (7, 11)
- Julio Reyes: keyboards (7, 11)
- Guillermo Vadalá: bass (7, 11)
- Aaron Sterling: drums (7, 11)

=== Production ===
- George Noriega: producer (1, 3–4, 6, 8–10), director (1, 3–4, 6, 8–10), music supervisor (1, 3, 6, 8–10), programmer (1, 3–4, 6, 8–10), recording engineer (1, 3–4, 6, 8–10)
- Sebastián Krys: producer (2, 5), mixing engineer (2, 5), recording engineer (2, 5)
- Julio Reyes: producer (7; 11), programmer (7; 11), mixing engineer (7; 11)
- Hanna Nicole: co-producer (all tracks)
- Jean Rodríguez: vocal producer (1, 3–5, 6–10), recording engineer (1, 3–5, 6–10)
- Pablo De La Loza: programmer (1), engineer (1)
- Mike Fuller: mastering engineering (1–2, 4–5, 6, 8–10)
- Javier Garza: mixing engineer (1–3, 4–5, 6, 8–10)
- Camilo Velandia: recording engineer (1, 3–4, 6, 8–10)
- Lee Levin: recording engineer (1, 3–4)
- Daniel Galindo: recording engineer (2–5)
- Pete Wallace: recording engineer (3–4, 6, 8–10), programmer (4, 6, 8–10)
- Pedro Alfonso: arrangements (5)
- Julie Justine Acosta: recording engineer (6, 8–10)
- Diego Contento: recording engineer (6, 8–10)
- Gene Grimaldi: mastering engineering (7–11)
- Natalia Schlesinger: mixing engineer (7, 11), recording engineer (7, 11)
- Robin Reumers: mixing engineer (7, 11), recording engineer (7, 11)
- Daniela Riaño: programmer (7, 11)
- Aaron Sterling: recording engineer (7, 11)
- Guillermo Vadalá: recording engineer (7, 11)
- Daniel Uribe: recording engineer (7, 11)

== Release history ==
| Region | Date | Format | Label | Ref |
|---|---|---|---|---|
| Various | 1 September 2022 | Digital download, streaming | Sony Music Latin | |
| Mexico | 1 September 2022 | CD; Digital download, streaming | Sony Music México | |
