= Lo Que Yo Sé de Ti =

Single by Ha*Ash

from the album Habitación Doble
- Language: Spanish
- English title: "What I Know About You"
- Released: 24 November 2008
- Recorded: 2006–2007 in Nashville, Tennessee
- Genre: Latin pop; pop
- Length: 3:46
- Label: Sony Music Latin
- Songwriters: Ashley Grace; Hanna Nicole; Leonel García
- Producer: Áureo Baqueiro

Ha*Ash singles chronology
"No Te Quiero Nada" (2008)	"Lo Que Yo Sé de Ti" (2008)	"Tú y Yo Volvemos al Amor" (2009)

Music video
- "Lo Que Yo Sé de Ti" on YouTube

"Lo Que Yo Sé de Ti" (transl. "What I Know About You") is a song written and recorded by the American musical duo Ha*Ash. It was released on November 24, 2008, as the second of the single from their third studio album Habitación Doble (2008). It was written by Ashley Grace, Hanna Nicole and Leonel García.

== Background and release ==
"Lo Que Yo Sé de Ti" it was written by Ashley Grace, Hanna Nicole and Leonel García while its production was done by Áureo Baqueiro. Is a song recorded by American duo Ha*Ash from her third studio album Habitación Doble (2008). It was released as the second single from the album on November 24, 2008, by Sony Music Entertainment.

== Music video ==
A music video for "Lo Que Yo Sé de Ti" was released in November, 2008. A music video for "Lo Que Yo Sé de Ti" was published on her YouTube channel on October 25, 2009. It was directed by Pablo Davila. As of October 2019, the video has over 29 million views on YouTube.

The second music video for "Lo Que Yo Sé de Ti" with Leonel García recorded live for his album A Tiempo (DVD) was released on August 1, 2011.

== Commercial performance ==
The track peaked at number 1 in the Mexico Airplay, Mexico Espanol Airplay and Monitor Latino charts in the Mexico.

== Credits and personnel ==
Credits adapted from AllMusic.

Recording and management

- Recording Country: United States
- Sony / ATV Discos Music Publishing LLC / Westwood Publishing
- (P) 2008 Sony Music Entertainment México, S.A. De C.V.

Ha*Ash

- Ashley Grace – songwriting, vocals, guitar
- Hanna Nicole – songwriting, vocals, guitar

Additional personnel

- Leonel García – songwriting
- Áureo Baqueiro – producer, engingeer
- Ricardo Calderón – photography
- Paul Forat – A&R
- Bob Britt – guitar
- Aaron Sterling – drums

== Charts ==
Chart	Position
Mexico (Monitor Latino)	1
Mexico (Billboard Mexican Airplay)	1
Mexico (Billboard Espanol Airplay)	1

== Release history ==
Region	Date	Edition(s)	Format	Label	Ref.
Various	November 24, 2008	Standard	Single	Sony Music Latin	
Various	March 20, 2012	Acoustic Version	Digital download; streaming	Sony Music Latin	
