= Te Dejo en Libertad =

Single by Ha*Ash

from the album A Tiempo
- Language: Spanish
- English title: "I'll Leave You in Freedom"
- Released: 11 July 2011
- Recorded: 2010 in Los Angeles, California
- Genre: power ballad
- Length: 3:58
- Label: Sony Music Latin
- Songwriters: Ashley Grace Pérez; Hanna Nicole Pérez; José Luis Ortega
- Producer: Áureo Baqueiro

Ha*Ash singles chronology
"Impermeable" (2011)	"Te Dejo en Libertad" (2011)	"Todo No Fue Suficiente" (2012)

Music video
- "Te Dejo En Libertad" on YouTube

"Te Dejo en Libertad" (transl. "I'll Leave You in Freedom") is a song written and recorded by American duo Ha*Ash. It was first included on their fourth studio album A Tiempo (2011) and was released as the second single. A live version was included on their album Primera Fila: Hecho Realidad (2014). The song then included on their live album Ha*Ash: En Vivo (2019). It was written by Ashley Grace, Hanna Nicole and José Luis Ortega.

== Background and release ==
"Te Dejo en Libertad" was recorded and included on the fourth studio album by Ha*Ash titled A Tiempo. It was later released as the second single from this album. Three years later it was included on the set list for Ha*Ash's live album Primera Fila: Hecho Realidad.

"Te Dejo en Libertad" featuring Maldita Nerea was released as a promotional single on January 8, 2016 in Spain. Ha*Ash and Maldita Nerea performed the song live together for the first time at the concert in Barclay Card Center, Spain on December 20, 2016.

== Commercial performance ==
The track peaked at number 29 in the Latin Pop Songs charts in the United States. In Mexico, the song peaked at number one on the Mexican Singles Chart and Monitor Latino. In 2013, it was announced that "Te Dejo en Libertad" had been certified Gold+Platinum.

== Music video ==
A music video for "Te Dejo en Libertad" was released on July 20, 2011. The video was filmed in Mexico City. As of June 2023, the video has over 535 million views on YouTube.

The second music video for "Te Dejo en Libertad", recorded live for the live album Primera Fila: Hecho Realidad, was released on April 24, 2015. It was directed by Nahuel Lerena. The video was filmed in Estudios Churubusco, Mexico City. As of June 2023, the video has over 253 million views on YouTube.

The third video for "Te Dejo en Libertad", recorded live for the live album Ha*Ash: En Vivo, was released on December 6, 2019. The video was filmed in Auditorio Nacional, Mexico City. As of June 2023, the video has over 23 million views on YouTube.

== Cover versions ==
In February 2019, Mexican band Pandora covered Ha*Ash's song for their album Mas Pandora Que Nunca.

== Credits and personnel ==
Credits adapted from AllMusic and Genius.

Recording and management

- Recording Country: United States
- Sony / ATV Discos Music Publishing LLC / Westwood Publishing
- (P) 2011 Sony Music Entertainment México, S.A. De C.V. (studio version)
- (P) 2014 Sony Music Entertainment US Latin LLC (live version)

Ha*Ash

- Ashley Grace – vocals, guitar, songwriting (studio version / live version)
- Hanna Nicole – vocals, guitar, piano, songwriting (studio version / live version)

Additional personnel

- Áureo Baqueiro – chorus, production, piano (studio version)
- José Luis Ortega – songwriting (studio version / live version)
- Vicky Echeverri – chorus, piano (studio version)
- Charlie García – A&R (studio version)
- Paul Forat – A&R (live version)
- Gonzalo Herrerias – A&R (live version)
- George Noriega – producer (live version)
- Tim Mitchell – producer (live version)

== Charts ==
Chart	Position
Mexico (Monitor Latino)	1
Mexico (Billboard Mexican Airplay)	1
Mexico (Billboard Espanol Airplay)	1
US Latin Pop Airplay (Billboard)	29

== Certifications ==
Region	Certification	Certified units/sales
Mexico (AMPROFON)	Platinum+Gold	90,000^{*}
^{*} Sales figures based on certification alone.

== Awards and nominations ==
Year	Awards ceremony	Award	Results
2011	Society Of Authors And Composers Of Mexico	Success SACM	Won
2012	Irresistible Awards Fanta	Song Irresistible	Won
2012	Premios Oye!	Favorite Song	Nominated
2015	Premios Quiero	Video of the Year	Nominated
2015	VEVO Certified	100,000,000 views	Won

== Release history ==
Region	Date	Edition(s)	Format	Label	Ref.
Various	July 11, 2011	Standard	CD Single	Sony Music Latin	
Various	November 11, 2014	Live Version	Digital download; streaming	Sony Music Latin	
Various	January 8, 2016	Maldita Nerea Remix	Digital download; streaming	Sony Music Latin	
Various	December 6, 2019	Live Version	Digital download; streaming	Sony Music Latin	
