= ¿De Dónde Sacas Eso? =

Single by Ha*Ash

from the album A Tiempo
- Language: Spanish
- English title: "Where Do You Get That?"
- Released: 11 July 2012
- Recorded: 2010 in Milan, Italy
- Genre: Latin pop; pop
- Length: 3:27
- Label: Sony Music Latin
- Songwriters: Ashley Grace; Hanna Nicole; José Luis Ortega
- Producer: Michele Canova

Ha*Ash singles chronology
"Todo No Fue Suficiente" (2012)	"¿De Dónde Sacas Eso?" (2012)	"Te Voy A Perder" (2013)

Music video
- "¿De Dónde Sacas Eso?" on YouTube

"¿De Dónde Sacas Eso?" (transl. "Where Do You Get That?") is a song written and recorded by the American musical duo Ha*Ash and is the ninth track from Ha*Ash's fourth studio album A Tiempo. where it was released as the fourth single from the album on July 11, 2012, and then included on their live album Ha*Ash: En Vivo (2019). It was written by Ashley Grace, Hanna Nicole and José Luis Ortega.

== Background and release ==
"¿De Dónde Sacas Eso?" was written by Ashley Grace, Hanna Nicole and José Luis Ortega while its production was done by Michele Canova. Is a song recorded by American duo Ha*Ash from her fourth studio album A Tiempo (2011). It was released as the fourth single from the album on July 11, 2012, by Sony Music Entertainment.

== Commercial performance ==
It peaked at #4 and #9 on Billboard Mexican Singles Chart, and at number #3 in the Monitor Latino. In 2014 the song was certified gold in Mexico.

== Music video ==
The first music video for "¿De Dónde Sacas Eso?", recorded live for the album A Tiempo Edition Deluxe, was released on August 1, 2011. As of June 2023, the video has over 63 million views on YouTube.

The music video for was released on July 11, 2012 on the Ha*Ash's YouTube and the other video channels. As of June 2023, the video has over 12 million views on YouTube.

The third video for "¿De Dónde Sacas Eso?", recorded live for the live album Ha*Ash: En Vivo, was released on December 6, 2019. The video was filmed in Auditorio Nacional, Mexico City. As of June 2023, the video has over 6 million views on YouTube.

== Credits and personnel ==
Credits adapted from AllMusic and Genius.

Recording and management

- Recording Country: United States
- Sony / ATV Discos Music Publishing LLC / Westwood Publishing
- (P) 2011 Sony Music Entertainment México, S.A. De C.V. (studio version)

Ha*Ash

- Ashley Grace – vocals, guitar, songwriting
- Hanna Nicole – vocals, guitar, songwriting

Additional personnel

- José Luis Ortega – songwriting
- Michele Canova – director, arranger
- Aaron Sterling – drums

== Charts ==
Chart	Position
Mexico (Monitor Latino)	3
Mexico (Billboard Mexican Airplay)	9
Mexico (Billboard Espanol Airplay)	4

=== Year-end charts ===
Year-end chart performance for "¿De Dónde Sacas Eso?"
Chart (2015)	Position
Mexico (Monitor Latino)	3

== Certifications ==
Region	Certification	Certified units/sales
Mexico (AMPROFON)	Gold	30,000^{*}
^{*} Sales figures based on certification alone.

== Awards and nominations ==
Year	Awards ceremony	Award	Results
2012	Society Of Authors And Composers Of Mexico	Success SACM	Won

== Release history ==
Region	Date	Edition(s)	Format	Label	Ref.
Various	July 11, 2012	Standard	CD Single	Sony Music Latin	
Various	March 27, 2012	Live Version	Digital download; streaming	Sony Music Latin	
Various	December 6, 2019	Live Version	Digital download; streaming	Sony Music Latin	
