= Tú y Yo Volvemos al Amor =

1998 song by Mónica Naranjo

Single by Mónica Naranjo

from the album Palabra de Mujer
- Released: 1998
- Genre: Latin pop; pop
- Length: 4:32
- Label: Sony Music Latin
- Songwriters: Mónica Naranjo; Cristóbal Sansano
- Producer: Cristóbal Sansano

Mónica Naranjo singles chronology
"Ámame o Déjame" (1997)	"Tú y Yo Volvemos al Amor" (1998)	"Las Campanas del Amor" (1998)

"Tú y Yo Volvemos al Amor" is a song written and recorded by the Spanish singer-songwriter Mónica Naranjo. It was released as the seventh single from the album in 1998. On February 6, 2009, American duo Ha*Ash recorded a cover version for their third studio album "Habitación Doble" (2008).

== Song information ==
"Tú y Yo Volvemos al Amor" was written by Mónica Naranjo and Cristóbal Sansano a while its production was done by Cristóbal Sansano. Is a song recorded by Spanish singer Mónica Naranjo from her second studio album Palabra de Mujer (1997). It was released as the seventh single from the album in 2008, by Sony Music Entertainment. Is the tenth track from Mónica Naranjo's second studio album Palabra de Mujer. It was released as the seventh single from the album in 1998.

== Music video ==
In the video for "Tu y Yo Volvemos al Amor", Mónica Naranjo is singing the song to an audience in a circular stage in 1998.

== Credits and personnel ==
Credits.

- Mónica Naranjo – vocals, songwriting, producer
- Cristóbal Sansano – songwriting, producer, arranger, programming

== Track listing ==
Promo CD (Spain)

1. "Tú y Yo Volvemos al Amor" — 4:32

Promo CD (Mexico)

1. "Tú y Yo Volvemos al Amor" — 4:32

Sobre tu piel Promo CD

1. Sobre tu piel (featuring Richard Cocciante) - 4:31
2. "Tú y Yo Volvemos al Amor" — 4:32

Sobre tu piel Maxi-CD

1. Sobre tu piel (featuring Richard Cocciante) - 4:31
2. "Tú y Yo Volvemos al Amor" — 4:32

Versions

- Studio
1. Álbum Versión — 04:32
- Live
1. Versión Tour Palabra de mujer
2. Versión Tour Grandiosas Internacional

== Ha*Ash version ==
"Tu y Yo Volvemos al Amor"

Single by Ha*Ash

from the album Habitación Doble
- Released: 6 February 2009
- Recorded: 2006–2007 in Nashville, Tennessee
- Genre: Latin pop
- Length: 4:39
- Label: Sony Music
- Producers: Graeme Pleeth, Mauri Stern

Ha*Ash singles chronology
"Lo Que Yo Sé de Ti" (2008)	"Tu y Yo Volvemos al Amor" (2009)	"Impermeable" (2011)

"Tu y Yo Volvemos al Amor" is a song by American duo Ha*Ash for their third studio album "Habitación Doble" (2008). It was released on February 6, 2009 as the album's third single. It was written by Cristóbal Sansano and Monica Naranjo while the song was produced by Graeme Pleeth and Mauri Stern. The music official video for the song hasn't been released.

Charts

Chart	Position
Mexico (Monitor Latino)	12
Mexico (Billboard Mexican Airplay)	31
Mexico (Billboard Espanol Airplay)	20

=== Release history ===
Region	Date	Format	Label(s)
México	February 6, 2009	Airplay	Sony Music México
