= Te Quedaste =

Single by Ha*Ash

from the album Ha*Ash
- Language: Spanish
- English title: "You Stayed"
- Released: 2003
- Recorded: 2002–2003
- Genre: Latin pop; power ballad
- Length: 3:46
- Label: Sony Music Latin
- Songwriters: Leonel García; Áureo Baqueiro
- Producer: Áureo Baqueiro

Ha*Ash singles chronology
"Estés Donde Estés" (2003)	"Te Quedaste" (2003)	"Soy Mujer" (2004)

Music video
- "Te Quedaste" on YouTube

"Te Quedaste" (transl. "You Stayed") is a Latin pop song recorded by American duo Ha*Ash. It was first included on Ha*Ash's first studio album Ha*Ash (2003) where it was released as the third single and then included on their live album deluxe Primera Fila: Hecho Realidad (2015).

== Background and release ==
"Te Quedaste" was written by Leonel García and Áureo Baqueiro. It serves as the three track to her first studio album Ha*Ash (2003), and then recorded live for his live album deluxe Primera Fila: Hecho Realidad in 2015.

== Commercial performance ==
The track peaked at number 28 in the Latin Pop Songs, number 17 in the Hot Latin songs and at number 17 in the Latin Airplay charts in the United States. In Mexico, the song peaked at number 4 in the Monitor Latino.

== Music video ==
A music video for "Te Quedaste" was released on February 1, 2014. Was published on her YouTube channel on October 25, 2009. As of October 2019, the video has over 38 million views on YouTube.

== Credits and personnel ==
Credits adapted from AllMusic and Genius.

Recording and management

- Recording Country: México
- Sony / ATV Discos Music Publishing LLC / Westwood Publishing
- (P) 2003 Sony Music Entertainment México, S.A. De C.V. (studio version)
- (P) 2015 Sony Music Entertainment México, S.A. De C.V. (live version)

Ha*Ash

- Ashley Grace – vocals, guitar (studio version / live version)
- Hanna Nicole – vocals, guitar (studio version / live version)

Additional personnel

- Áureo Baqueiro – songwriting, recording engineer, arranger, director (studio version)
- Leonel García – songwriting (studio version) / live version)
- Armando Ávila – guitar, acoustic guitar, recording engineer (studio version)
- Rodolfo Cruz – recording engineer (studio version)
- Arranger Mateo Aguilar – arranger (live version)
- Fernando Ruíz Velasco – arranger (live version)
- Rodrigo Duarte – arranger (live version)
- Edy Vega – arranger (live version)
- Lary Ruíz Velasco – arranger (live version)
- Áureo Baqueiro – songwriting (live version)
- Gerardo Morgadoo – engineer (live version)
- Alfonso Palacios – engineer (live version)
- Joel Alonso – engineer (live version)
- Jules Ramllano – director, engineer (live version)

== Charts ==
Chart	Position
Mexico (Monitor Latino)	4
US Hot Latin Songs (Billboard)	28
US Latin Airplay (Billboard)	17
US Latin Pop Songs (Billboard)	28

== Release history ==
Region	Date	Edition(s)	Format	Label	Ref.
Various	2003	Standard	Single	Sony Music Latin	
Various	November 13, 2015	Acoustic Version	Digital download; streaming	Sony Music Latin	
