= Impermeable (song) =

Single by Ha*Ash

from the album A Tiempo
- Language: Spanish
- English title: "Waterproof"
- Released: 21 March 2011
- Recorded: 2010 in Los Angeles, California
- Genre: Latin pop; pop
- Length: 4:07
- Label: Sony Music Latin
- Songwriters: Áureo Baqueiro; Daniela Blau
- Producer: Áureo Baqueiro

Ha*Ash singles chronology
"Tú y Yo Volvemos al Amor" (2009)	"Impermeable" (2011)	"Te Dejo en Libertad" (2011)

Music video
- "Impermeable" on YouTube

"Impermeable" (transl. "Waterproof") is a song recorded by American duo Ha*Ash. It was released on March 21, 2011 as the first of the single from their fourth studio album A Tiempo (2011). It was written by Áureo Baqueiro and Daniela Blau.

== Background and release ==
"Impermeable" it was written by Áureo Baqueiro and Daniela Blau while its production was done by Baqueiro. Is a song recorded by American duo Ha*Ash from her fourth studio album A Tiempo (2011). It was released as the lead single from the album on March 21, 2011, by Sony Music Entertainment.

== Commercial performance ==
The track peaked at number one on the Mexican Singles Chart, and Monitor Latino. The track peaked at number 6 in the Mexico Airplay. In 2012 the song was certified gold in Mexico.

== Music video ==
A music video for "Impermeable" was released on May 4, 2011. The video was filmed in Hotel W on Mexico City. It was directed by Fausto Terán. As of October 2019, the video has over 44 million views on YouTube.

The second music video for "Impermeable", recorded live for the album A Tiempo Edition Deluxe, was released on August 1, 2011. As of October 2019, the video has over 8 million views on YouTube.

== Credits and personnel ==
Credits adapted from AllMusic and Genius.

Recording and management

- Recording Country: United States
- Sony / ATV Discos Music Publishing LLC / Westwood Publishing
- (P) 2011 Sony Music Entertainment México, S.A. De C.V. (studio version)

Ha*Ash

- Ashley Grace – vocals, guitar
- Hanna Nicole – vocals, guitar

Additional personnel

- Áureo Baqueiro – songwriting, production, piano
- Daniela Blau – songwriting
- Rene García – bass, guitar, drums

== Charts ==
Chart	Position
Mexico (Monitor Latino)	1
Mexico (Billboard Mexican Airplay)	6
Mexico (Billboard Espanol Airplay)	1
México (Monitor Latino Top 20)	16

== Certifications ==
Region	Certification	Certified units/sales
Mexico (AMPROFON)	Gold	30,000^{*}
^{*} Sales figures based on certification alone.

== Awards and nominations ==
Year	Awards ceremony	Award	Results
2012	Irresistible Awards Fanta	Song Irresistible	Nominated

== Release history ==
Region	Date	Edition(s)	Format	Label	Ref.
Various	March 21, 2011	Standard	CD single; Digital download; streaming	Sony Music Latin	
Various	March 27, 2012	Live Version	Digital download; streaming	Sony Music Latin	
