= Cumbia Ninja (soundtrack) =

2013 soundtrack album by various artists

Soundtrack album by Various artists
- Released: October 15, 2013
- Recorded: 2013
- Genre: Latin pop
- Length: 37:17
- Label: Sony Music

Singles from Cumbia Ninja
- 1. "Ojos en la espalda" Released: April 5, 2013; 2. "Ceviche" Released: May 1, 2013; 3. "Somos niebla" Released: May 26, 2013; 4. "Aire caliente" Released: June 6, 2013; 5. "El horóscopo dice" Released: June 12, 2013

Cumbia Ninja is the soundtrack album to the eponymous series. The soundtrack was released on October 15, 2013, by Sony Music.

== Background ==
=== Production ===
The album was recorded during the filming of the first season of the television series. The lead single was "Ojos en la espalda" released on July 8, 2013, with their official video, and subsequently published other singles from the album.

=== Released ===
Released in Latin America on October 8, 2013, in Italy on October 12, 2013, with 16 track. The album is available in record stores throughout Latin America and through iTunes, Deezer and Spotify in Mexico and Argentina.

The album is composed of 14 songs plus 3 additional versions performed by Ricardo Abarca and Brenda Asnicar, the lyrics of the songs on the album were written by Andres Gelos, screenwriter Cumbia Ninja and feature produced by Puerto Rican Master Chris.

== Track listing ==
=== Latin American edition ===
The Latin American edition contains 14 songs.
No.	Title	Writer(s)	Length
1.	"Subiré al infierno" (Brenda Asnícar & Ricardo Abarca)	Andres Gelos, Master Chris	3:32
2.	"Ojos en la espalda" (Brenda Asnícar & Ricardo Abarca)	Andres Gelos, Master Chris	2:14
3.	"Jaulita de Oro" (Brenda Asnícar & Ricardo Abarca)	Andres Gelos, Master Chris	1:44
4.	"Soy tu dueño" (Brenda Asnícar & Ricardo Abarca)	Andres Gelos	3:59
5.	"Que el viento me lleve" (Brenda Asnícar)	Andres Gelos, Master Chris	2:26
6.	"Flor seca en tu cuarto" (Brenda Asnícar)	Andres Gelos, Master Chris	2:57
7.	"El Horóscopo Dice" (Ricardo Abarca)	Andres Gelos, Master Chris	3:24
8.	"Inevitable" (Cumbia Ninja cast)	Andres Gelos, Master Chris	2:53
9.	"Luz de Sombra" (Cumbia Ninja cast)	Andres Gelos, Master Chris	3:01
10.	"Somos Niebla" (Cumbia Ninja cast)	Andres Gelos, Master Chris	2:42
11.	"Aire caliente" (Ricardo Abarca & Cumbia Ninja cast)	Andres Gelos, Master Chris	3:49
12.	"Subtitulalo" (Ricardo Abarca)	Andres Gelos, Master Chris	2:32
13.	"Ceviche" (Brenda Asnícar & Ricardo Abarca)	Andres Gelos, Master Chris	3:33
