= Si Pruebas una Vez =

Single by Ha*Ash

from the album Ha*Ash
- Language: Spanish
- English title: "If You Try Once"
- Released: 2 November 2004
- Recorded: 2002–2003
- Genre: Latin pop; power ballad
- Length: 3:20
- Label: Sony Music Latin
- Songwriters: Ángela Dávalos; Juan Luis Broissin Cruz
- Producer: Áureo Baqueiro

Ha*Ash singles chronology
"Soy Mujer" (2004)	"Si Pruebas una Vez" (2004)	"Amor a Medias" (2005)

Music video
- "Si Pruebas una Vez" on YouTube

"Si Pruebas una Vez" (transl. "If You Try Once") is a song recorded by American duo Ha*Ash. It was first included on Ha*Ash's first studio album Ha*Ash (2003) where it was released as the fifth single and then included on their live album edition deluxe Primera Fila: Hecho Realidad (2015).

== Background and release ==
"Si Pruebas una Vez" was written by Ángela Dávalos and Juan Luis Broissin Cruz. It serves as the nine track to her first studio album Ha*Ash (2003) and then recorded live for his live album edition deluxe Primera Fila: Hecho Realidad (2015).

In November 2004, the track was re-released as a digital download as the promotional single for Ha*Ash. The track "Soy Mujer", which also appeared on the parent album, were also released digitally.

== Music video ==
A music video for "Si Pruebas una Vez" for his live album edition deluxe Primera Fila: Hecho Realidad (2015) was released on November 20, 2015. It was directed by Nahuel Lerena. The video was filmed in Lake Charles, Louisiana, United States.

== Commercial performance ==
The track peaked at number 5 in the Monitor Latino charts in the Mexico.

== Credits and personnel ==
Credits adapted from Genius.

Recording and management

- Sony / ATV Discos Music Publishing LLC / Westwood Publishing
- 2003 Recording Country: México (studio version)
- 2015 Recording Country: United States (live version)
- (P) 2003 Sony Music Entertainment México, S.A. De C.V. (studio version)
- (P) 2015 Sony Music Entertainment México, S.A. De C.V. (live version)

Ha*Ash

- Ashley Grace – vocals, guitar (studio version / live version)
- Hanna Nicole – vocals, guitar (studio version / live version)

Additional personnel

- Ángela Dávalos – composer (studio version / live version)
- Juan Luis Broissin Cruz – composer (studio version / live version)
- Armando Ávila – guitar, acoustic guitar, recording engineer (studio version)
- Áureo Baqueiro – recording engineer (studio version)
- Pablo De La Loza – co-producer, co-director (live version)
- George Noriega – producer (live version)
- Tim Mitchell – producer (live version)

== Charts ==
Chart	Position
Mexico (Monitor Latino)	5

== Release history ==
Region	Date	Edition(s)	Format	Label	Ref.
Mexico	November 2, 2004	Standard	Single	Sony Music México	
Various	November 13, 2015	Acoustic Version	Digital download; streaming	Sony Music Latin	
