= Soy Mujer (song) =

Single by Ha*Ash

from the album Ha*Ash
- Language: Spanish
- English title: "I'm a Woman"
- Released: 15 April 2004
- Recorded: 2002–2003
- Genre: Latin pop
- Length: 3:30
- Label: Sony Music Latin
- Songwriter: Áureo Baqueiro
- Producer: Áureo Baqueiro

Ha*Ash singles chronology
"Te Quedaste" (2003)	"Soy Mujer" (2004)	"Si Pruebas una Vez" (2004)

Music video
- "Soy Mujer" on YouTube

"Soy Mujer" (transl. "I'm a Woman") is a Latin pop song recorded by American duo Ha*Ash. It was first included on Ha*Ash's first studio album "Ha*Ash" (2003) where it was released as the fourth single and then included on their live album Primera Fila: Hecho Realidad (2014).

== Background and release ==
"Soy Mujer" was written by Áureo Baqueiro. It serves as the opening track to her first studio album Ha*Ash (2003), and then recorded live for his live album Primera Fila: Hecho Realidad (2014).

In April 2004, the track was re-released as a digital download as the promotional single for Ha*Ash. The track "Si Pruebas una Vez", which also appeared on the parent album, were also released digitally.

== Commercial performance ==
The track peaked at number 7 in the Monitor Latino charts in the Mexico.

== Music video ==
A music video for "Soy Mujer" for his live album Primera Fila: Hecho Realidad (2014) was released on April 20, 2015. It was directed by Nahuel Lerena. The video was filmed in Estudios Churubusco, City Mexico. As of October 2019, the video has over 31 million views on YouTube.

== Credits and personnel ==
Credits adapted from AllMusic and Genius.

Recording and management

- Recording Country: México
- Sony / ATV Discos Music Publishing LLC / Westwood Publishing
- (P) 2003 Sony Music Entertainment México, S.A. De C.V. (studio version)
- (P) 2014 Sony Music Entertainment México, S.A. De C.V. (live version)

Ha*Ash

- Ashley Grace – vocals, guitar, songwriting (studio version / live version)
- Hanna Nicole – vocals, guitar, songwriting (studio version / live version)

Additional personnel

- Áureo Baqueiro – songwriting, recording engineer, arranger, director (studio version)
- Armando Ávila – guitar, acoustic guitar, recording engineer (studio version)
- Michelle Batrez – cornet (studio version)
- Rodolfo Cruz – recording engineer (studio version)
- Áureo Baqueiro – songwriting (live version)
- Pablo De La Loza – co-producer, co-director (live version)
- George Noriega – producer (live version)
- Tim Mitchell – producer (live version)

== Charts ==
Chart	Position
Mexico (Monitor Latino)	7

== Release history ==
Region	Date	Edition(s)	Format	Label	Ref.
Mexico	April 15, 2004	Standard	Single	Sony Music México	
Various	November 11, 2014	Live Version	Digital download; streaming	Sony Music Latin	
