= Ha*Ash (album) =

Studio album by Ha*Ash
- Released: May 11, 2003
- Recorded: 2002–2003
- Studio: Cosmos; Brava! Music; Manú Estudios (Mexico City, Mexico)
- Genre: Latin; Pop; Country
- Length: 36:58
- Language: Spanish
- Label: Columbia Records
- Producer: Áureo Baqueiro

Ha*Ash chronology
Ha*Ash (2003)	Mundos Opuestos (2005)

Special Edition cover

Singles from Ha*Ash
- 1. "Odio Amarte (in Mexico)" Released: April 23, 2003; 2. "Estés Donde Estés" Released: 2003; 3. "Te Quedaste" Released: September 9, 2003; 4. "Soy Mujer (in Mexico)" Released: April 15, 2004; 5. "Si Pruebas una Vez (in Mexico)" Released: November 2, 2004

Ha*Ash is the self-titled debut album by American Latin pop duo Ha*Ash. It was officially released on May 11, 2003, under the Sony Music label.

Five singles and one promotional single were released from the album. Its lead single, "Odio Amarte", was released in April 2003. "Estés Donde Estés" was chosen as the album's second single, released in 2003. The next singles were "Te Quedaste", "Soy Mujer" and "Si Pruebas una Vez".

== Background and production ==
In April 2002, they signed to Sony Music Latin when they were 15 and 16. They recorded their self-titled debut album Ha*Ash with the Mexican producer Áureo Baqueiro in 2003 and it was recorded between 2002 and 2003. Mabel worked with writers and producers such as Áureo Baqueiro, Ángela Dávalos and Mónica Vélez to create the album, with its music incorporating the genres of pop and country.

== Release and promotion ==
It was officially released on May 11, 2003, under the Sony Latin label. After the success of their first album, a special edition of the album was released. It features videos of their first three singles: "Odio Amarte", "Estés Donde Estés" and "Te Quedaste"; behind the scenes footage of the videos, karaoke and an interview with Hanna and Ashley about the promotion of their album.

=== Singles ===
- "Odio Amarte" (I Hate to Love You) launched in April 2003.
- "Estés Donde Estés" (Wherever You Are) was chosen as the album second single and released in 2003 and was selected as the main theme of the telenovela Clap... your dream by Televisa. It peaked at #9 on Billboard Latin Pop chart and #14 on Billboard Hot Latin Tracks.
- "Te Quedaste" (You Stayed) was released as the album's third single in 2003. It peaked at #17 on Billboard Latin Pop chart and #28 on Billboard Hot Latin Tracks.
- "Soy Mujer" (I'm a Woman) launched in April 2004. It peaked at #7 on Monitor Latino in Mexico.
- "Si Pruebas una Vez" (If You Try Once) launched in November 2004. It peaked at #5 on Monitor Latino in Mexico.

== Commercial performance ==
The album peaked at #3 in the Mexican album charts and #19 in the US Billboard Latin Pop Albums. In February 2004, they received their first gold record for more than 75,000 copies of their debut album sold in Mexico. In March 2004, Ha*Ash prepared to launch the album in Puerto Rico and the United States. In March 2004, Ha*Ash received a platinum record for sales of 140,000 copies. The album was eventually certified platinum + gold in Mexico.

== Track listing ==
Ha*Ash — Standard edition
No.	Title	Writer(s)	Producer(s)	Length
1.	"Soy Mujer"	Áureo Baqueiro	Áureo Baqueiro	3:30
2.	"Odio Amarte"	Ashley Grace; Hanna Nicole; Baqueiro	Baqueiro	3:30
3.	"Te Quedaste"	Baqueiro; Leonel García	Baqueiro	3:46
4.	"Estés Donde Estés"	Baqueiro; Salvador Rizo	Baqueiro	4:01
5.	"Prefiero"	Baqueiro	Baqueiro	4:08
6.	"Deja de Llover"	Baqueiro	Baqueiro	3:35
7.	"Superficial"	Ashley; Hanna; Baqueiro; Mónica Vélez	Baqueiro	3:35
8.	"Milagros De Ocasión"	Baqueiro	Baqueiro	3:32
9.	"Si Pruebas una Vez"	Juan Luis Broissin; Ángela Dávalos	Baqueiro	3:20
10.	"Extraña En La Ciudad"	Baqueiro; Fernando González; Vélez	Baqueiro	4:01
Total length:				36:58

Ha*Ash — Special edition bonus DVD
No.	Title	Length
1.	"Odio Amarte" (Official Music Video)
2.	"Estés Dónde Estés" (Official Music Video)
3.	"Te Quedaste" (Official Music Video)
4.	"Odio Amarte" (Behind the Scenes)
5.	"Estés Dónde Estés" (Behind the Scenes)
6.	"Te Quedaste" (Behind the Scenes)
7.	"Odio Amarte" (Karaoke)
8.	"Estés Dónde Estés" (Karaoke)
9.	"EPK"

== Credits and personnel ==
Credits adapted from the album's liner notes.

=== Musicians ===
- Ashley Grace – vocals (all tracks)
- Hanna Nicole – vocals (all tracks)
- Armando Ávila: bass (1–9), acoustic guitar (1–9), electric guitar (1–9), keyboards (all tracks)
- Áureo Baqueiro: keyboards (all tracks), background vocals (all tracks)
- Sabo Romo: bajo (10), acoustic guitar (10), electric guitar (10)
- Michelle Batrez: background vocals (all tracks)
- Fanny Chernitsky: background vocals (all tracks)
- Mongus: guitar (5)
- Pepe Damián: drums (all tracks)

=== Production ===
- Áureo Baqueiro: producer (all tracks), recording engineer (all tracks), arrangements (1–9)
- Armando Ávila: recording engineer (all tracks), arrangements (1–9)
- Rodolfo Cruz: recording engineer (all tracks), mixing (2, 4–7, 9–10)
- Rodolfo Vázques: mixing (1, 3, 8)
- Sabo Romo: arrangements (10)
- Luis Gil: mastering (all tracks)

== Charts ==
Title	Peak chart positions
US (Billboard Latin)	19
Mexico (AMPROFON)	3

== Certifications ==
=== Album ===
Region	Certification	Certified units/sales
Mexico (AMPROFON)	Platinum+Gold	225,000^{^}
^{^} Shipments figures based on certification alone.

=== Edition Deluxe (DVD) ===
Region	Certification	Certified units/sales
Mexico (AMPROFON)	Platinum	20,000^{^}
^{^} Shipments figures based on certification alone.

== Awards ==
Year	Awards	Category	Results	Notes
2004	National Academy of Music	New Artist of the Year	Winners	First Place won

== Release history ==
Region	Date	Edition(s)	Format	Label
Mexico	May 13, 2003	Standard	CD	Sony Music México
United States	March, 2004	Standard	CD	Sony Music Latin
Puerto Rico	March, 2004	Standard	CD	Sony Music Latin
Mexico	July 24, 2004	Deluxe Edition	CD/DVD	Sony Music México
