= Habitación Doble =

2008 studio album by Ha*Ash

Studio album by Ha*Ash
- Released: 1 August 2008
- Recorded: 2006–2007
- Studio: Nashville, Tennessee
- Genre: Latin; pop
- Length: 42:56
- Language: Spanish
- Label: Sony BMG
- Producer: Áureo Baqueiro; Graeme Pleth

Ha*Ash chronology
Mundos Opuestos (2005)	Habitación Doble (2008)	A Tiempo (2011)

Special Edition cover

Singles from Habitación Doble
- 1. "No Te Quiero Nada" Released: 8 July 2008; 2. "Lo Que Yo Sé de Ti" Released: 24 November 2008; 3. "Tú y Yo Volvemos al Amor" Released: 6 February 2009

Habitación Doble (English: "Double Room") is the third studio album by American Latin pop duo Ha*Ash. The album was released on 1 August 2008 by Sony Music Latin. The album was recorded in Nashville, Tennessee, United States. Habitación Doble is a primarily a pop-rock and soft ballads album.

Three singles were released from the album. Its lead single "No Te Quiero Nada" peaked at six on the Billboard Latin Pop chart, and won an award from Cadena Dial. The following single "Lo Que Yo Sé de Ti" was released in October 2008 and "Tú y Yo Volvemos al Amor" launched in February 2009.

== Background and production ==
The album was recorded in Nashville, Tennessee, United States. Ha*Ash described the album as more "pop-rock and soft ballads". Ha*Ash collaborated with Brandie Carlile on the song "Already Home", the first English song officially recorded by them.

== Release and promotion ==
Ha*Ash released three songs from the album starting with the single "No Te Quiero Nada". The other songs released were "Lo Que Yo Sé de Ti" and "Tú y Yo Volvemos al Amor".

=== Singles ===
- "No Te Quiero Nada" ("I don't love you at all") was released as the album's lead single on 8 July 2008. It peaked at #6 on the Billboard Latin Pop chart. It won an award from Cadena Dial. It was nominated for Latin Pop Airplay Song of the Year, Duo or Group at the Billboard Latin Music Awards.
- "Lo Que Yo Sé de Ti" was chosen as the album's second single, released on 24 November 2008.
- "Tú y Yo Volvemos al Amor" was released as the album's third single in February 2009.

== Chart performance ==
The album peaked at #6 in the Mexican album charts and #14 in the US Billboard Latin Pop Albums.

== Critical reception ==
Professional ratings
Review scores
Source	Rating
Allmusic	3.5/5 stars

The album received mixed reviews from the critics.

- Jason Birchmeier, from Allmusic, gave a mixed review, giving the album 3.5 out of 5 stars, saying:
  On their third album, the sisters come up with another handful of Latin pop gems amid an otherwise solid album. Hanna and Ashley were born in the States and sing well in English, so it was only a matter of time before they tried out an English-language crossover single like "Already Home." The song's crossover potential is enhanced by a vocal feature courtesy of upstart folk-rock singer/songwriter Brandi Carlile.

== Track listing ==
Habitación Doble — Standard edition
No.	Title	Writer(s)	Producer(s)	Length
1.	"Hasta Que Llegaste Tú"	Ashley Grace; Hanna Nicole; Rafael Vergara	Mauri Stern; Graeme Pleeth	3:13
2.	"Te Dejo"	Gian Marco	Áureo Baqueiro	3:47
3.	"No Te Quiero Nada"	Áureo Baqueiro	Baqueiro	4:12
4.	"Lo Que Yo Sé de Ti"	Ashley; Hanna; Leonel García	Baqueiro	3:46
5.	"Vamos a Llamarlo Amor"	Baqueiro; Salvador Rizo	Baqueiro	3:48
6.	"Already Home" (feat. Brandi Carlile)	Ashley; Hanna; Blair Daly; Troy Verges	Stern; Pleeth	4:02
7.	"Tú y Yo Volvemos al Amor"	Cristóbal Sánsano; Mónica Naranjo	Stern; Pleeth	4:39
8.	"A Media Luz"	Bárbara Muñoz; Claudia Brant; Rafael Esparza	Stern; Pleeth	3:23
9.	"Esta Mujer"	Ashley; Hanna; L. García	Baqueiro	4:56
10.	"Malas Costumbres" (Real Bad Habit)	Ashley; Hanna; Bryan Keith; Don Goodman	Stern; Pleeth	3:05
11.	"Aunque No Estés Aquí" (Navigate By the Stars)	Hanna; Kany García; Ernesto Lira; Hugo Lira	Stern; Pleeth	4:03
Total length:				42:56

Deluxe edition (CD)
No.	Title	Writer(s)	Producer(s)	Length
12.	"Labios Partidos"	Raul Ornelas; Cesar Lazcano Malo	Baqueiro	4:17
13.	"Me Niego a Olvidarte"	Erika Ender; Esparza; Ettore Grenci	Baqueiro	4:08
14.	"Punto Final"	Ashley; Hanna; Ender	Baqueiro	3:47
15.	"Already Home" (spanish)	Ashley; Hanna	Baqueiro	3:59

Deluxe edition (DVD)
No.	Title	Length
1.	"Que Hago Yo?" (Video)	3:46
2.	"Lo Que Yo Sé De Ti" (Video)	3:42
3.	"No Te Quiero Nada" (Video)	4:08
4.	"Que Hago Yo?" (Making Of)	3:49
5.	"Lo Que Yo Sé De Ti" (Making Of)	3:34
6.	"No Te Quiero Nada" (Making Of)	5:04
7.	"Documentary Film"
8.	"Pics"

== Credits and personnel ==
Credits adapted from the liner notes of the Mexican edition of Habitación Doble.

=== Musicians ===
- Ashley Grace: vocals (all tracks)
- Hanna Nicole: vocals (all tracks), acoustic guitars (8)
- Brandi Carlile: (6)
- Aaron Sterling: drums (2–5, 9)
- Jimmy Jhonson: bass (2–5, 9)
- Dean Parks: acoustic guitars (2–5, 9), electric guitar (2–5, 9), mandoline (2–5, 9), pedal steel (2–5, 9)
- John Gilutin: keyboards (2–5, 9)
- Bob Britt: electric guitar (1, 6–8, 10–11)
- Gary Lunn: bass (1, 6–8, 10–11)
- Kerry Marx: electric guitar (1, 6–8, 10–11), acoustic guitars (1, 6–8, 10–11)
- Brian Fullen: drums (1, 6–8, 10–11)
- Bob Patin: keyboards (1, 6–8, 10–11), synthesized (1, 6–8, 10–11)
- Scott Sanders: pedal Steel (1, 6–8, 10–11)
- Paul Furnance: acoustic guitars (7)

=== Production ===
- Áureo Baqueiro: producer (2–5, 9), arranger (2–5, 9), vocals arrangements (2–5, 9)
- Graeme Pleeth: producer (1, 6–8, 10–11), programming (1, 6–8, 10–11), mixing (1, 6–8, 10–11)
- Mauri Stern: producer (1, 6–8, 10–11)
- Gustavo Borner: recording engineer (2–5, 9), mixing (2–5, 9)
- Joseph Greco: recording assisting (2–5, 9), guitar recording engineer (2–5, 9)
- Nichoali Baxter: recording engineer (2–5, 9)
- Francisco Ruiz: recording engineer (5)
- Jeef Balding: recording engineer (1, 6–8, 10–11)
- Jean Rodríguez: vocal director (6–7)
- Alejandro Jaén: vocal director (8, 10)
- Guido Laris: vocal director (1)
- Justin Daniela: recording engineer (1, 6–8, 10–11)
- Robert Dante: voice editor (1, 6–8, 10–11)
- Martin Feveyar: recording (6)
- Jorge Fonseca: vocal director (6)
- Chris Gehringer: mastering (1–11)

=== Design ===
- Paul Forat: A&R, executive Produced
- Maury Stern: A&R
- Lennie Díaz: A&R
- Charlie García: A&R
- Ricardo Calderón: album Artwork Photographer

== Charts ==
=== Weekly charts ===
Weekly chart performance for Habitación Doble
Chart (2008)	Peak position
US (Billboard Latin)	14
México (AMPROFON)	6

=== Year-end charts ===
2008 year-end chart performance for Habitación Doble
Chart (2008)	Position
Mexican Albums (AMPROFON)	62

== Certifications ==
Region	Certification	Certified units/sales
Mexico (AMPROFON)	Gold	40,000^{^}
^{^} Shipments figures based on certification alone.

== Release history ==
Region	Date	Edition(s)	Format	Label
Mexico	1 August 2008	Standard	CD; Digital download	Sony Music México
United States	5 August 2008	Standard	CD; Digital download	Sony Music Latin
Mexico	31 August 2008	Deluxe Edition	CD/DVD; Digital download	Sony Music Latin
