= Todo No Fue Suficiente =

Single by Ha*Ash

from the album A Tiempo
- Language: Spanish
- English title: "Everything Was Not Enough"
- Released: 2 January 2012
- Recorded: 2010 in Los Angeles, California
- Genre: Latin pop; pop
- Length: 3:36
- Label: Sony Music Latin
- Songwriters: Ashley Grace; Hanna Nicole; Yoel Henríquez
- Producer: Áureo Baqueiro

Ha*Ash singles chronology
| "Te Dejo en Libertad" (2011) | "Todo No Fue Suficiente" (2012) | "¿De Dónde Sacas Eso?" (2012) |

Music video
- "Todo No Fue Suficiente" on YouTube

"Todo No Fue Suficiente" (transl. "Everything Was Not Enough") is a song written and recorded by the American musical duo Ha*Ash and is the tenth track from Ha*Ash's fourth studio album A Tiempo where it was released as the third single from the album on January 2, 2012, and then included on their live album Ha*Ash: En Vivo (2019). It was written by Ashley Grace, Hanna Nicole and Yoel Henríquez.

== Background and release ==
"Todo No Fue Suficiente" it was written by Ashley Grace, Hanna Nicole and Yoel Henríquez while its production was done by Áureo Baqueiro. Is a song recorded by American duo Ha*Ash from her fourth studio album A Tiempo (2011). It was released as the third single from the album on January 2, 2012, by Sony Music Entertainment.

== Commercial performance ==
It peaked at #11 and #2 on Billboard Mexican Singles Chart, and at number #4 in the Monitor Latino.

== Music video ==
The first music video for "Todo No Fue Suficiente", recorded live for the album A Tiempo Edition Deluxe, was released on August 1, 2011. As of October 2019, the video has over 28 million views on YouTube.

The music video for was released on July 11, 2012 on the Ha*Ash's YouTube and the other video channels. As of October 2019, the video has over 160 million views on YouTube.

The third video for "Todo No Fue Suficiente", recorded live for the live album Ha*Ash: En Vivo, was released on December 6, 2019. The video was filmed in Auditorio Nacional, Mexico City.

== Credits and personnel ==
Credits adapted from AllMusic and Genius.

Recording and management

- Recording Country: United States
- Sony / ATV Discos Music Publishing LLC / Westwood Publishing
- (P) 2011 Sony Music Entertainment México, S.A. De C.V. (studio version)

Ha*Ash

- Ashley Grace – vocals, guitar, songwriting
- Hanna Nicole – vocals, guitar, songwriting

Additional personnel

- Yoel Henríquez – songwriting
- Áureo Baqueiro – director, arranger
- Aaron Sterling – drums

== Charts ==
| Chart | Position |
|---|---|
| Mexico (Monitor Latino) | 4 |
| Mexico (Billboard Mexican Airplay) | 2 |
| Mexico (Billboard Espanol Airplay) | 11 |
| Mexico (Monitor Latino Top 20) | 5 |

== Awards and nominations ==
| Year | Awards ceremony | Award | Results |
|---|---|---|---|
| 2012 | VEVO | 100 000 000 views | Won |

== Release history ==
| Region | Date | Edition(s) | Format | Label | Ref. |
|---|---|---|---|---|---|
| Various | January 2, 2012 | Standard | CD Single | Sony Music Latin | |
| Various | March 27, 2012 | Live Version | Digital download; streaming | Sony Music Latin | |
| Various | December 6, 2019 | Live Version | Digital download; streaming | Sony Music Latin | |
