= A Tiempo (Ha*Ash album) =

2011 studio album by Ha*Ash

Studio album and video by Ha*Ash
- Released: 16 May 2011
- Recorded: 2009–2010
- Studios: Los Angeles, California; Milan, Italy
- Genres: Power ballad; pop rock; Latin pop; electropop
- Length: 42:07
- Language: Spanish
- Label: Sony Music Latin
- Producers: Áureo Baqueiro; Michele Canova

Ha*Ash chronology
Habitación Doble (2008)	A Tiempo (2011)	Primera Fila: Hecho Realidad (2014)

Ha*Ash studio album chronology
Habitación Doble (2008)	A Tiempo (2011)	30 de Febrero (2017)

Special Edition cover

Singles from A Tiempo
- 1. "Impermeable" Released: 21 March 2011; 2. "Te Dejo en Libertad" Released: 11 July 2011; 3. "Todo No Fue Suficiente" Released: 2 January 2012; 4. "¿De Dónde Sacas Eso?" Released: 11 July 2012

A Tiempo (transl. "On Time") is the fourth studio album by American Latin pop duo Ha*Ash. It was released under the label Sony BMG on 16 May 2011. Recording sessions for the album was over a period of almost a year between Los Angeles, California and Milan, Italia. A Tiempo is a primarily a synth-pop sound and electric album, consisting mainly of stripped down instruments such as the synthesizers, piano and acoustic guitar.

Four singles were released from A Tiempo worldwide. "Impermeable" was released as the lead single on March 21, 2011. The following singles "Te Dejo en Libertad", "Todo No Fue Suficiente" and "¿De Dónde Sacas Eso?". Ha*Ash promoted the album with a series of live performances and later embarked on A Tiempo Tour (2011).

== Background and production ==
It is the band's first studio album in three years, after of their previous album, Habitación Doble (2008), and it was recorded over a period of almost a year between Los Angeles, California and Milan, Italia. Ha*Ash worked with producer Áureo Baqueiro and invited Michele Canova. A Tiempo is a primarily a synth-pop sound and electric album, consisting mainly of stripped down instruments such as the synthesizers, piano and acoustic guitar.

Ha*Ash, with the help of Leonel Garcia (Sin Bandera), Natalia Lafourcade and Alejandro Fernández, created one of the best albums of his career and became so successful that they had released a special edition, a deluxe edition, and went for tours through Latin America.

== Released and promotion ==
The album was released on 16 May 2011 in the United States and Mexico, under the Sony Music Latin label. The deluxe edition of A Tiempo includes the acoustic videos, an audio CD, an exclusive documentary, and was made available on 20 March 2012.

=== Singles ===
Ha*Ash released four song from the album starting with the first single "Impermeable" (Waterproof) was released as the album's lead single on 21 March 2011 and peaked at number 1 in the Mexico Español Airplay and 6 in the Mexico Airplay. On 2012 the song was certified gold in Mexico.

The other songs released were; "Te Dejo en Libertad" (I'll Leave You in Freedom) was chosen as the album's second single, released on 11 July 2011. It peaked at #29 on Billboard Latin Pop chart and #1 on Mexico Español Airplay, Mexico Airplay and Monitor Latino. The single was released to U.S. radio this upcoming 8 August. In 2013, it was announced that "Te Dejo en Libertad" had been certified Platinum and Gold.

"Todo No Fue Suficiente" (All Was Not Enough) was released as the album's third single on 2 January 2012. It peaked at #11 and #2 on Billboard Mexican Chart, and "¿De Dónde Sacas Eso?" (Where Do You Get That?) was released as the album's fourth single on 11 July 2012. It peaked at #4 and #9 on Billboard Mexican Chart. On 2014 the song was certified gold in Mexico.

== Commercial performance ==
The album peaked at #4 in the Mexican album charts. A Tiempo was certified gold two month after its release in Mexico for shipments of over 30,000 copies, according to the AMPROFON. On 15 May 2012, was certified as Platinum and gold, subsequently as double platinum, for exceeding sales of 120,000 sold copies on 29 November 2017. In April 2019, it was announced by AMPROFON that the album had achieved a double platinum and gold certification, which equals 150,000 copies sold.

== Tour ==
To promote the album, Ha*Ash embarked on a world concert tour during 2011 and 2013. They started their own "A Tiempo Tour" in 2011, visiting Mexico, United States Spain, Costa Rica, Peru and Ecuador. The tour began in the National Auditorium of Mexico City on 24 September 2011 and ended two year later.

== Track listing ==
Standard edition
No.	Title	Writer(s)	Producer(s)	Length
1.	"Impermeable"	Áureo Baqueiro; Daniela Blau	Áureo Baqueiro	4:07
2.	"Frente a Frente"	Ashley Grace; Hanna Nicole; Rafael Vergara	Baqueiro	4:03
3.	"Faltas Tú"	Baqueiro	Baqueiro	4:01
4.	"Irremediable"	Ashley; Hanna; Vergara	Baqueiro	4:02
5.	"¿Qué Haré Con Este Amor?"	Alejandra Alberti; Ignacio Morales	Baqueiro	3:18
6.	"Sólo Una Vez"	Jorge Ballesteros; Britti Alessandro	Michele Canova	4:22
7.	"Te Amo Más Que Ayer"	Ashley; Hanna; Yoel Henríquez	Canova	3:30
8.	"Te Dejo en Libertad"	Ashley; Hanna; José Luis Ortega	Baqueiro	3:58
9.	"¿De Dónde Sacas Eso?"	Ashley; Hanna; Ortega	Canova	3:27
10.	"Todo No Fue Suficiente"	Ashley; Hanna; Henríquez	Baqueiro	3 :36
11.	"Camina Conmigo" (feat. Río Roma)	Claudia Brant; Ortega	Canova	3:43
Total length:				42:07

Bonus DVD
No.	Title	Length
1.	"Impermeable" (acoustic)
2.	"No Te Quiero Nada" (acoustic)
3.	"Te Dejo En Libertad" (acoustic)
4.	"Todo No Fue Suficiente" (acoustic)
5.	"Faltas Tú" (acoustic)
6.	"Que Haré Con Este Amor" (acoustic)
7.	"Odio Amarte" (acoustic)
8.	"Sólo Una Vez" (acoustic)
9.	"De Dónde Sacas Eso" (acoustic)
10.	"Camina Conmigo" (acoustic)

Deluxe Edition (CD)
No.	Title	Writer(s)	Producer(s)	Length
12.	"Hoy No Habrá Mañana"	Ashley; Hanna; Baqueiro	Baqueiro	3:34
13.	"Un Beso Tuyo"	Ashley; Hanna; Baqueiro	Baqueiro	3:42
14.	"Camina Conmigo"	Brant; Ortega	Canova	3:41

Deluxe Edition (DVD)
No.	Title	Length
1.	"Odio Amarte [live]" (Video)
2.	"De Dónde Sacas Eso? [live]" (Video)
3.	"No Te Quiero Nada [live]" (Video)
4.	"Te Dejo En Libertad [live]" (Video)
5.	"Sólo Una Vez [live]" (Video)
6.	"Lo Que Yo Sé De Ti [live]" (Video)
7.	"Impermeable [live]" (Video)
8.	"Amor A Medias [live]" (Video)
9.	"Todo No Fue Suficiente [live]" (Video)
10.	"Qué hago yo? [live]" (Video)
11.	"Estés Donde Estés [live]" (Video)
12.	"Impermeable" (Video)
13.	"Te Dejo En Libertad [live]" (Video)
14.	"Todo No Fue Suficiente" (Video)
15.	"Impermeable" (Behind the scenes)
16.	"Documentary film"

=== Formats ===
- CD;– includes the 11-track album.
- CD and DVD (Mexican edition standard) – Digipak case edition containing two discs: DVD of the concert and one CD containing 11 tracks.
- CD and DVD (Edition deluxe) – Digipak case edition containing three discs: DVD of the concert and two CD containing 14 tracks.
- Digital download;– contains the 14 tracks from the CD release.
- Digital download (Edition deluxe);– contains the 14 tracks from the CD release, 14 videos and a documentary.

== Credits and personnel ==
Credits adapted from the liner notes of the Mexican deluxe edition of A Tiempo.

=== Musicians ===
- Ashley Grace – vocals (all tracks)
- Hanna Nicole – vocals (all tracks)
- Áureo Baqueiro: keyboards (1–5, 8, 10, 12–13), vocals (1–5, 8, 10, 12–13)
- Vicky Echeverri: background vocals (6–7, 10, 14), keyboards (6–7, 10, 14)
- René Garza: guitar (1–14)
- Christian Rigano: keyboards (1–14)
- Aaron Sterling: drums (1–14)

=== Production ===
- Áureo Baqueiro: arranger (1–5, 8, 10, 12–13), producer (1–5, 8, 10, 12–13)
- Michele Canova: arranger (6–7, 10, 14), producer (6–7, 10, 14)
- Pablo Manresa arranger (2)
- Rafa Vergara: arranger (4)

=== Design ===
- Charlie García: A&R
- Guillermo Gutiérrez-Leyva: A&R
- Betto Rojas: A&R

== Charts ==
=== Weekly charts ===
Weekly chart performance for A Tiempo
Chart (2011)	Peak position
México (AMPROFON)	4

=== Year-end charts ===
2011 year-end chart performance for A Tiempo
Chart (2011)	Position
Mexican Albums (AMPROFON)	16

== Certifications ==
Region	Certification	Certified units/sales
Mexico (AMPROFON)	3× Platinum	180,000^{‡}
^{‡} Sales+streaming figures based on certification alone.

== Release history ==
Region	Date	Edition(s)	Format	Label
Mexico	16 May 2011	Standard	CD; Digital download	Sony Music México
United States	16 May 2011	Standard	CD/DVD; Digital download	Sony Music Latin
Mexico	16 May 2011	Standard	CD/DVD; Digital download	Sony Music México
Mexico	20 March 2012	Deluxe Edition	CD/DVD; Digital download	Sony Music México
