= Matisse (Mexican band) =

Mexican musical group

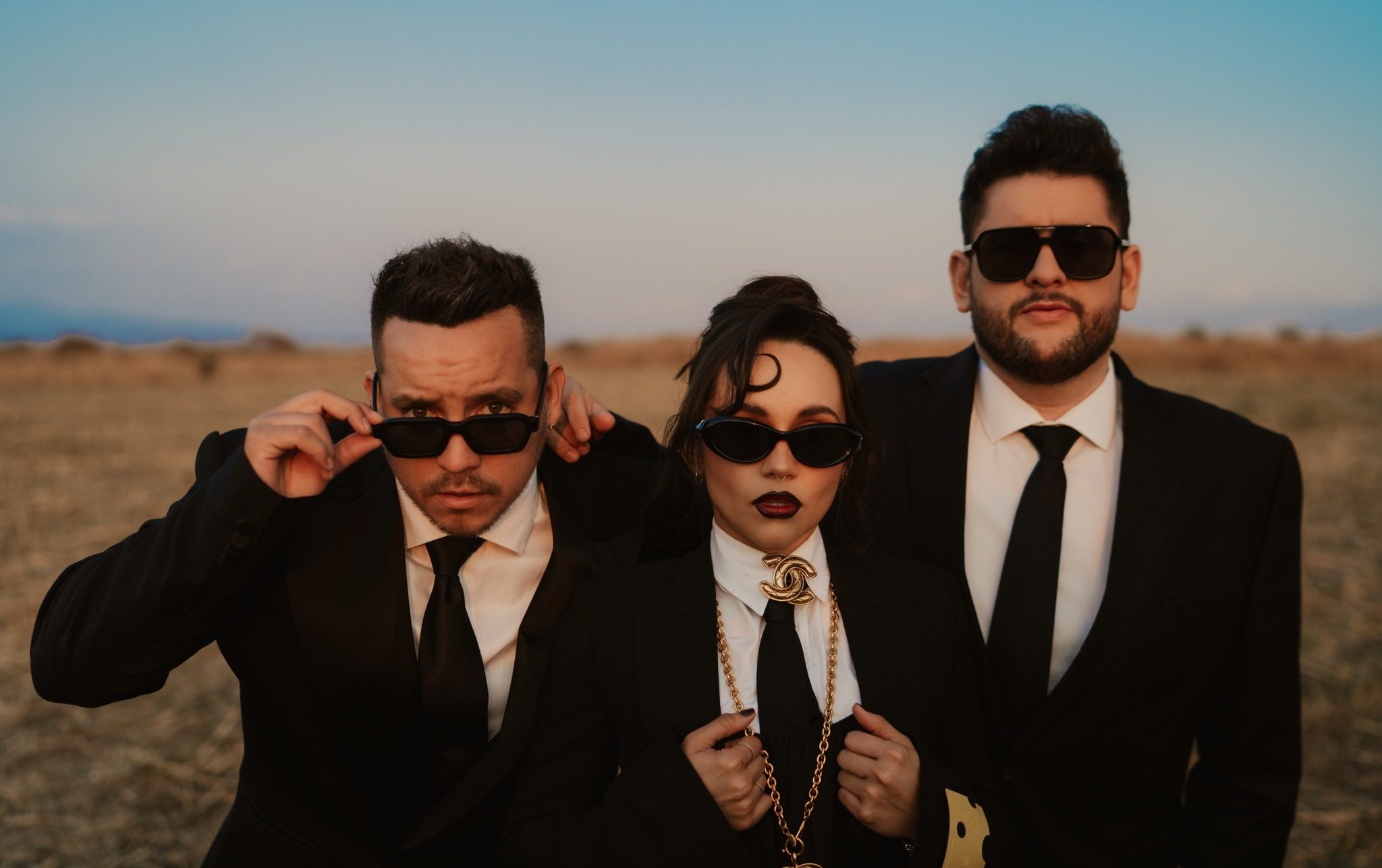
- From their single "Aplauso" (2025)

Background information
- Origin: Mexicali, Baja California, Mexico
- Genres: Pop, Folk, Regional Mexicano
- Instruments: Voice; Guitar; Ukulele; Piano
- Years active: 2014–present
- Label: Sony Music Latin
- Members: Román Torres; Pablo Preciado; Melissa Robles
- Website: www.matissemx.com

Matisse is a Mexican pop band formed in 2014 in Mexicali, composed of Melissa Robles, Pablo Preciado, and Román Torres. Their discography includes the studio albums Sube (2015), Por tu bien (2017), Tres (2020), Así de Enamorados (2020), De norte a sur (2022), and Bella Nostalgia (2024).

The band has achieved commercial success with singles such as "La misma luna", "Todavía", and "Eres tú". In 2022, they received a Latin Grammy Award for Best Regional Mexican Song for the track "Como lo hice yo".

In 2024, Matisse embarked on the Bella Nostalgia international tour, celebrating their tenth anniversary with performances in Mexico, the United States, Peru, and Guatemala. They have performed at venues such as the Auditorio Nacional and festivals including Tecate Pa'l Norte.

== Biography ==
=== Formation ===
Pablo and Román first met when they were studying music together in Guadalajara. When they moved to Mexico City, they became friends and started writing songs together. Pablo presented some of these songs to Paul Forat, vice president of Sony Music México, who circulated them, leading to artists like Carlos Rivera, Alejandra Guzmán and Cristian Castro recording some of them. It was then that Pablo introduced Román, co-author of some of the songs, to Paul, and from then on they began to work together.

The name Matisse was chosen after Pablo and Román saw a painting by Henri Matisse in Leonel García's recording studio. Later, Melissa joined the group. She had become famous when she uploaded to YouTube a video of her singing “Fascinación” by Carlos Rivera, who helped her sign with Sony.

=== 2014–2016: Sube ===
Matisse released their first single, called "La misma luna", in August 2014. That same year, they were featured in the song "Sé que te vas" by the American duo Ha*Ash.

In 2015, Matisse released their debut album Sube, which included a new version of "La Misma Luna". Later that year, they were nominated as "Artista Revelación" (Breakthrough Artist) in the Latin Grammy Awards. In 2016, they were invited to sing at the Palacio de los Deportes during Ha*Ash's concert.

=== 2017–present: Por tu bien ===
In 2017, Matisse released their second album, entitled Por tu bien. Before releasing the album, they released a single, called "Todavía", along with a music video. That year, they sang at Sony Music México's event UpFront, along with Ha*Ash and Carlos Rivera.

In 2018, they released another single, Acuérdate de mí, and the titular song from Por tu bien as their third single. That same year, they opened for Mexican band Reik's concerts in the United States and shared the stage with them during some events in Mexico. On April 9, 2019, Matisse released their single "Eres tú", featuring Reik. In the middle of the year, they released their urban rhythm single "Primer avión", featuring Colombian singer Camilo.

== Members ==
- Román Torres was born July 2, 1987, in Mexicali, Baja California. He is a singer and guitarist.
- Pablo Preciado was born April 11, 1988, in Hermosillo, Sonora. He is a singer and plays the guitar and piano.
- Melissa Robles was born December 21, 1989, in Mexicali, Baja California. She studied marketing before becoming a singer. She also plays the ukulele.

== Discography ==
Studio albums

- 2015: Sube
- 2017: Por tu bien
- 2020: Tres
- 2022: Así de enamorados
- 2023: De norte a sur
- 2024: Bella nostalgia
