= Río Roma =

Mexican Latin pop duo

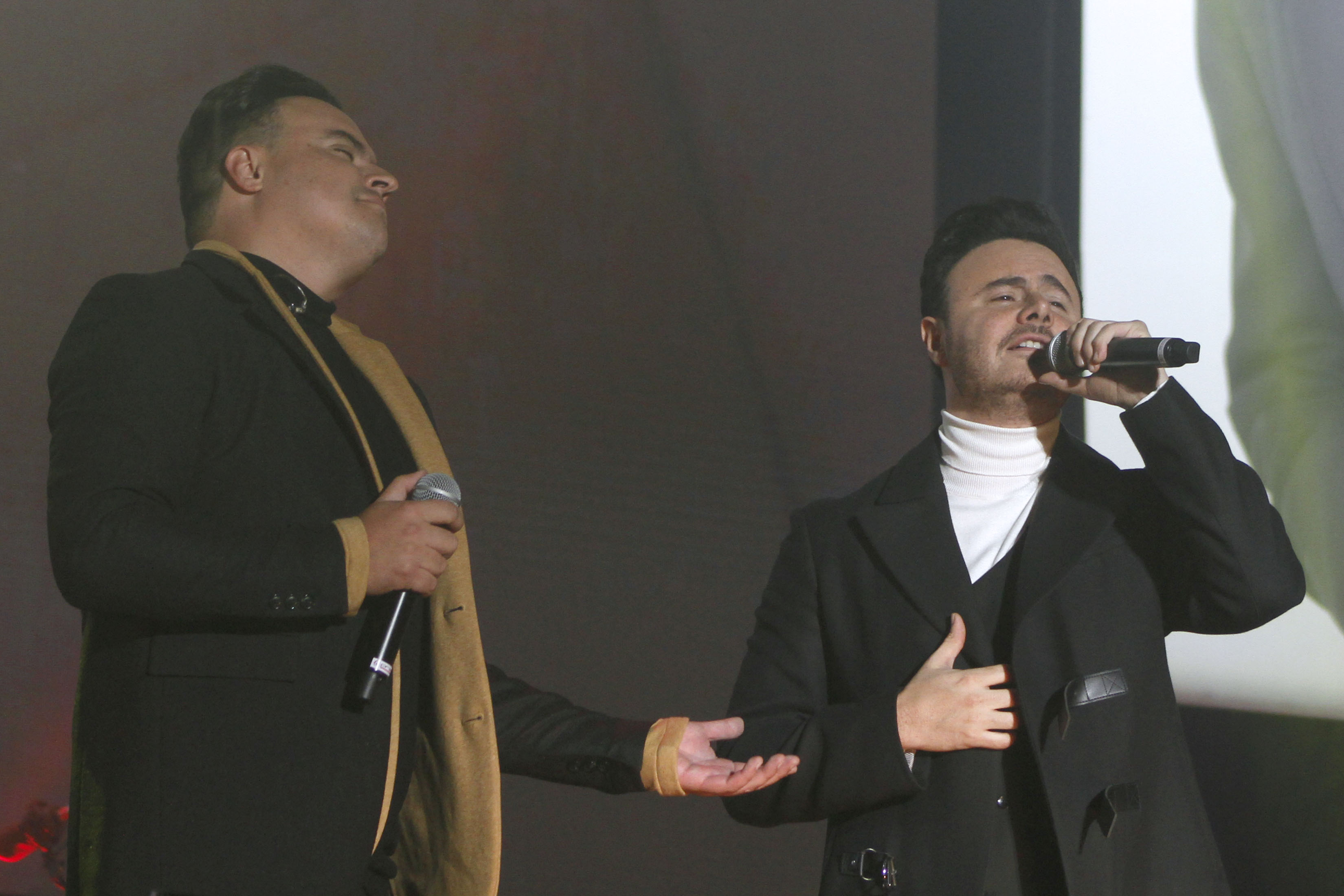
- Rio Roma in 2019

Background information
- Origin: Tulancingo, Hidalgo, Mexico
- Genres: Latin pop, Latin ballad
- Years active: 2008–present
- Label: Sony Music Mexico
- Members: José Luis Ortega Castro; Raúl Ortega Castro
- Website: rioroma.mx

Río Roma are a Mexican Latin pop duo. It consists of brothers José Luis Ortega Castro (born 17 January 1981) and Raúl Ortega Castro (born 17 July 1984).

José Luis is also a prolific songwriter. Famous singers who had recorded songs written by him include: Ha*Ash, María José, Alejandro Fernández, Yuridia, Camila, Alejandra Guzmán and Pandora, among others.

They chose "Río Roma" as their name because of how it sounds, and it reads "Oír Amor" (hearing love) backwards.

== Biography ==
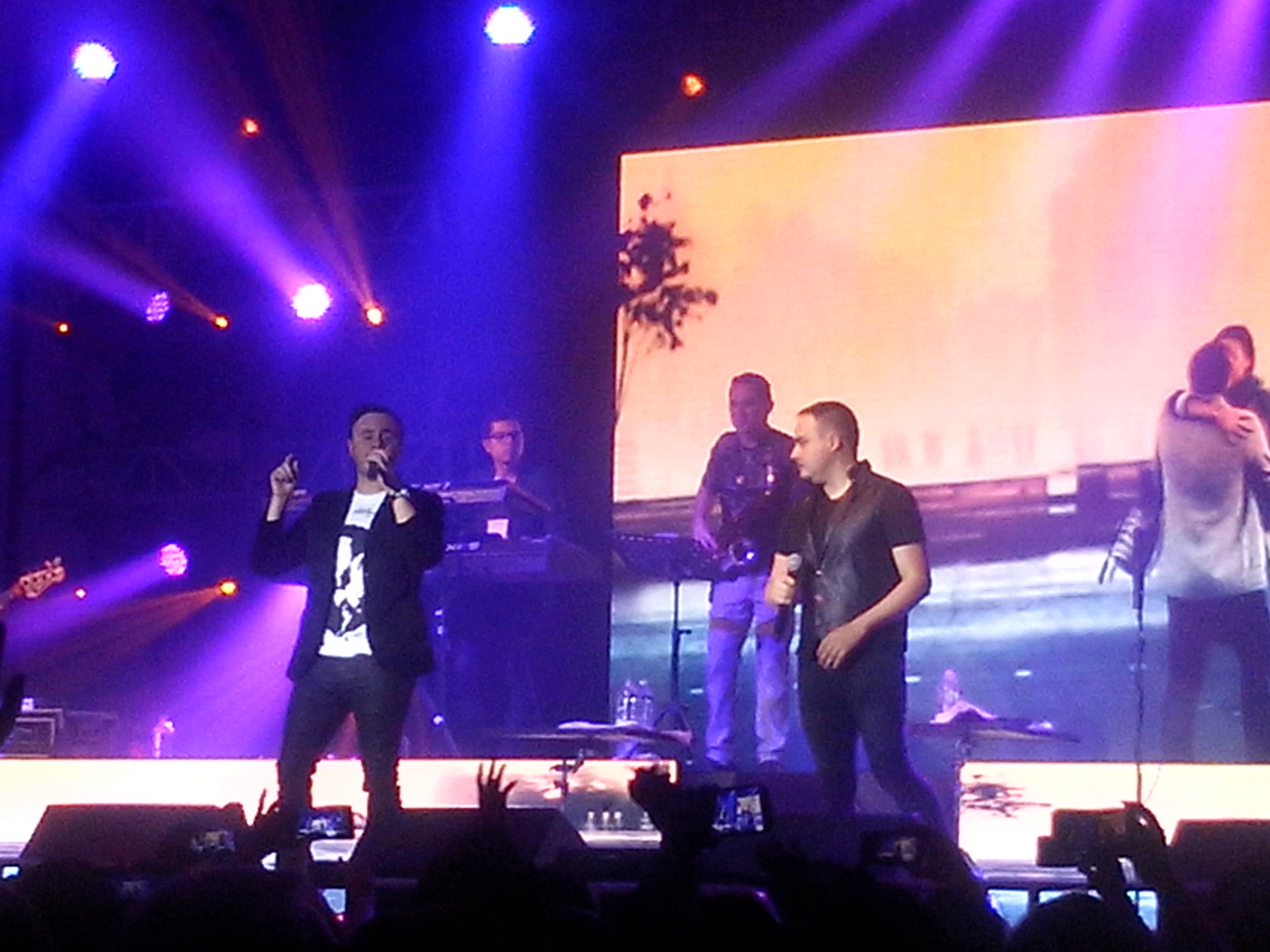
Río Roma performing in Tampico in 2016

From 1997 until 2002, José Luis was member of Mexican boy band Ciao Mama, with whom he recorded two albums: "Ciao Mama" in 1999, and "Puntos Suspensivos..." in 2001, both under EMI Music México. In 2008 José Luis and Raúl recorded a Norteño album under their first names. They started as Río Roma in 2011.

== Discography ==
=== Albums ===
==== Studio albums ====
List of albums, with selected chart positions, sales figures and certifications
Title	Album details	Certifications
José y Raúl	Released: 2008	
Al Fin Te Encontré	Released: 2011; Label: Sony Music México; Format: CD, digital download	AMPROFON: 3× Platinum
Otra Vida	Released: 2013; Label: Sony Music México; Format: CD, digital download	AMPROFON: 2× Platinum + Gold
Eres La Persona Correcta En El Momento Equivocado	Released: 2016; Label: Sony Music México; Format: CD, digital download	AMPROFON: 2× Platinum + Gold
Rojo	Released: 2021; Label: Sony Music México; Format: CD, digital download	

==== Compilations Albums ====
List of albums, with selected chart positions, sales figures and certifications
Title	Album details	Certifications
Hoy Es Un Buen Día	Released: 2014; Label: Sony Music México; Format: CD, digital download	

=== Eps ===
Title
Details
Notes
Lo Más Romántico de
- Released: 10 February 2021
- Label: Sony Music Entertainment México
- Format: Digital download, Streaming
Track listing
- No.	Title	Length
  1.	"Yo Te Prefiero a Ti" (with Yuridia)	3:32
  2.	"Mi Persona Favorita"	3:10
  3.	"Me Cambiaste la Vida"	3:53
  4.	"Eres la Persona Correcta en el Momento Equivocado"	3:55
  5.	"Todavía No Te Olvido" (featuring Carlos Rivera)	3:30
  6.	"Hilo Rojo"	3:42
  Total length:		21:42
Seis Canciones y un Tequila
- Released: 26 September 2022
- Label: Sony Music Entertainment México
- Format: Digital download, streaming
Track listing
- No.	Title	Length
  1.	"¿Será Prudente?" (with Pepe Aguilar)	3:46
  2.	"Tú Me Gustas" (with Carin Leon)	3:26
  3.	"Por Ella Tomo" (with Gerardo Ortíz)	3:05
  4.	"Fue un Placer Amarte" (with Virlán García)	3:49
  5.	"Un Tequila" (with Grupo Firme and Torai)	3:20
  6.	"Tú Eres Mi Amor (Versión Regional Mexicana)" (with Calibre 50)	3:48
  Total length:		21:14

=== Singles ===
==== As lead artist ====
Title	Year	Certifications	Album
"Al Fin Te Encontré"	2011	AMPROFON: Gold	Al Fin Te Encontré
"No Lo Beses"	2011		Al Fin Te Encontré
"Me Cambiaste la Vida"	2011	AMPROFON: 4× Platinum	Al Fin Te Encontré
"Por Eso Te Amo"	2011	AMPROFON: 2× Platinum	Al Fin Te Encontré
"Tan Sólo un Minuto"	2012	AMPROFON: Platinum	Al Fin Te Encontré
"Me Arrepiento"	2013		Otra Vida
"Así Me Decías (Perdedor)"	2013		Otra Vida
"Mi Persona Favorita"	2014	AMPROFON: Diamond + Gold	Otra Vida
"Hoy Es un Buen Día" (with Noel Schajris)	2014		Otra Vida
"No lo Beses" (saxo version)	2014		Otra Vida
"Te Quiero Mucho, Mucho"	2016	AMPROFON: 3× Platinum	Eres La Persona Correcta En El Momento Equivocado
"Eres La Persona Correcta En El Momento Equivocado"	2016	AMPROFON: 2× Platinum + Gold	Eres La Persona Correcta En El Momento Equivocado
"Contigo"	2016	AMPROFON: Platinum + Gold	Eres La Persona Correcta En El Momento Equivocado
"Princesa" (with CNCO)	2016	AMPROFON: Platinum + Gold	Eres La Persona Correcta En El Momento Equivocado
"Caminar de Tu Mano" (with Fonseca)	2016	AMPROFON: 4× Platinum + Gold	Eres La Persona Correcta En El Momento Equivocado
"Todavía No te Olvido" (with Carlos Rivera)	2016	AMPROFON: 4× Platinum	Eres La Persona Correcta En El Momento Equivocado
"Niña, ¿Qué Tienen Tus Ojos? (En Vivo)" (with Leo Dan)	2020		Non-album single
"Lo Siento Mucho" (with Thalia)	2020	AMPROFON: Gold	Rojo
"Deberías Estar Aquí"	2020	AMPROFON: Platinum	Rojo
"Algo Especial" (with Descemer Bueno)	2020		Rojo
"Yo Te Prefiero a Ti" (with Yuridia)	2020	AMPROFON: 3× Platinum + Gold	Rojo
"Hilo Rojo"	2020	AMPROFON: Gold	Rojo
"Mitad Mentira, Mitad Verdad" (with Andy Rivera)	2020		Rojo
"Maggica Navidad (Remix)"	2020		Non-album single
"Homesick " (with Kane Brown)	2020		Rojo
"Tú Eres Mi Amor" (with Calibre 50)	2021		Seis Canciones y un Tequila
"Un Tequila" (with Grupo Firme and Torai)	2021		Seis Canciones y un Tequila
"Fue un Placer Amarte" (with Virlán García)	2021		Seis Canciones y un Tequila
"Por Fin Me Enamoré"	2021		Non-album single
"Por Ella Tomo" (with Gerardo Ortiz)	2021		Seis Canciones y un Tequila
"Tú Me Gustas" (with Carin Leon)	2022	AMPROFON: Gold	Seis Canciones y un Tequila
"Amor Eterno"	2022		Non-album single
"El Vendedor" (with Mocedades)	2022		Non-album single
"¿Será Prudente?" (with Pepe Aguilar)	2022		Seis Canciones y un Tequila
"Beso Prohibido"	2023		Non-album single

==== As featured artist ====
List of singles, with selected chart positions
Title	Year	Peak chart positions		Album
Title	Year	Airplay	Español Airplay	Album
"Resistiré México" (among Artists for Mexico)	2020	4	15	Non-album single
"—" denotes a title that did not chart.
