= Amaral discography =

- Studio albums: 8
- Extended plays: 1
- Live albums: 2
- Singles: 38
- Video albums: 3

As of 2019, the discography of Spanish rock group Amaral consists of 8 studio albums, 2 live albums, 3 live DVDs/Blu-rays, 4 special-edition box sets, 38 singles, and 1 EP. The group has released music through EMI International, Virgin Records, Capitol, Gatorama, and Antártida.

== Studio albums ==
- Amaral (1998)
- Una pequeña parte del mundo (2000)
- Estrella de mar (Starfish) (2002)
- Pájaros en la cabeza (2005)
- Gato negro dragón rojo (double album, 2008)
- Hacia lo salvaje (2011)
- Nocturnal (2015)
- Salto al color (2019) – No. 1 Spain

== Live albums ==
- La barrera del sonido (in Spanish) (2009)
- Superluna: Directo desde el Planeta Tierra (2017)

== Special editions ==
- Caja Especial Navidad (2006)
- 1998–2008 (2012)
- 4 Álbumes (2013)
- Nocturnal Solar Sessions (2017)

== EPs ==
- Granada (2009)

== DVDs & Blu-rays ==
- El comienzo del big bang: Gira 2005 (2005)
- La barrera del sonido (2009)
- Superluna: Directo desde el Planeta Tierra (2017)

== Singles ==
Year	Title	Peak chart position	Album
Year	Title	(Spain) SP	Album
1998	"Rosita"	—	Amaral
1998	"Voy a acabar contigo"	—	Amaral
1998	"No sé qué hacer con mi vida"	—	Amaral
1999	"Un día más"	—	Amaral
1999	"Tardes"	—	Amaral
2000	"Cómo hablar"	—	Una pequeña parte del mundo
2000	"Subamos al cielo"	—	Una pequeña parte del mundo
2000	"Cabecita loca"	—	Una pequeña parte del mundo
2001	"Nada de nada" ( Cecilia version)	—	Una pequeña parte del mundo
2002	"Sin ti no soy nada"	—	Estrella de mar
2002	"Te necesito"	—	Estrella de mar
2002	"Toda la noche en la calle"	—	Estrella de mar
2003	"Moriría por vos"	—	Estrella de mar
2003	"Estrella de mar"	18	Estrella de mar
2003	"Salir corriendo"	—	Estrella de mar
2005	"El universo sobre mí"	1	Pájaros en la cabeza
2005	"Días de verano"	—	Pájaros en la cabeza
2005	"Marta, Sebas, Guille y los demás"	—	Pájaros en la cabeza
2006	"Resurrección"	—	Pájaros en la cabeza
2006	"Si tú no vuelves" (with Chetes/Miguel Bosé cover version)	—	Pájaros en la cabeza
2006	"Revolución"	—	Pájaros en la cabeza
2008	"Kamikaze"	—	Gato negro◆Dragón rojo
2008	"Tarde de domingo rara"	—	Gato negro◆Dragón rojo
2008	"Perdóname"	37	Gato negro◆Dragón rojo
2009	"El blues de la generación perdida"	—	Gato negro◆Dragón rojo
2011	"Hacia lo salvaje"	7	Hacia lo salvaje
2011	"Antártida"	40	Hacia lo salvaje
2012	"Cuando suba la marea"	—	Hacia lo salvaje
2012	"Hoy es el principio del final"	—	Hacia lo salvaje
2012	"Esperando un resplandor"	—	Hacia lo salvaje
2014	"Ratonera"	11	Non-album single
2015	"Llévame muy lejos"	—	Nocturnal
2016	"Lo que nos mantiene unidos"	—	Nocturnal
2016	"Nocturnal"	—	Nocturnal
2017	"La niebla"	—	Nocturnal
2017	"Unas veces se gana y otras se pierde"	—	Nocturnal
2017	"Hijas del Cierzo"	—	Zaragoza CFF anthem
2019	"Mares igual que tú"	—	Salto al color
