= El universo sobre mí =

Single by Amaral

from the album Pájaros en la cabeza
- B-side: "No soy como tú (versión acústica)"
- Released: 25 February 2005
- Recorded: 2005
- Genre: Pop rock
- Length: 4:07
- Label: Virgin Records
- Songwriters: Eva Amaral; Juan Aguirre
- Producer: Cameron Jenkins

Amaral singles chronology
| "Salir corriendo" (2003) | "El universo sobre mí" (2005) | "Días de verano" (2005) |

Music video
- "El universo sobre mí" on YouTube

"El universo sobre mí" (lit. transl. "The universe above me") is a song performed by the Spanish rock duo Amaral, consisting of vocalist Eva Amaral and guitarist Juan Aguirre. They wrote the song and Cameron Jenkins produced it. Virgin Records released it as the first single from the album Pájaros en la cabeza on 25 February 2005. The song debuted at number 1 in Spain, where it remained for three consecutive weeks. Additionally, it peaked at number 43 in the American Billboard's Hot Latin Tracks.

== Composition and release ==
"El universo sobre mí"
A 20-second sample of the introduction of "El universo sobre mí", which begins with a keyboard, which differs from other songs by the duo due to injuries sustained by the lead guitarist.

After concluding Amaral's tour to promote the album Estrella de mar (2002), Eva Amaral and Juan Aguirre wrote "El universo sobre mí". The tour had been stressful, with extensive travel and a lack of rest exacerbated by the newfound fame brought by the album. The lyrics of the song reflect "a chant to move forward, to feel free and to do whatever they wanted to do", (Note: Original text in Spanish: "Esta canción es un canto a salir adelante, a sentirnos libres y a seguir haciendo lo que nos viniera en gana".) as Eva explained, as they felt their band was drifting from its origins. During this period, Aguirre, the group's lead guitarist, injured his hand, leading him to play the introduction with a keyboard instead of a guitar. In live performances, he used a Mellotron instead. Regarding the lyric "Quiero encontrar mi sitio" ("I want to find my place"), Eva explained that it is about finding balance and peace of mind in the world. The song's initial working title was "Solo queda una vela".

Cameron Jenkins produced it along with the album, Pájaros en la cabeza. Virgin Records released it as the first single from the album on 25 February 2005. Aguirre mentioned that the album cover of Pájaros en la cabeza is a doll-like metaphor for how they were feeling at the time, and that they faced problems getting the cover to remain the final one.

== Reception ==
=== Critical response ===
Lucía Noguerales from Onda Cero compared the introduction of "El universo sobre mí" to the song "Strawberry Fields Forever" by the Beatles, as it uses a Mellotron. El Crítico de IA (Note: "El Crítico de la IA" (The AI Critic) is a blend of Popes80 reviewers and insights generated by the artificial intelligence chatbot ChatGPT.) wrote for the Spanish magazine Popes80 that the song is a pop rock tune that "has the incredible ability to connect with our deepest emotions, transporting us to dreamy places and awakening feelings we thought we had forgotten." The European Space Agency added the song to its playlist for the launch of the Jupiter Icy Moons Explorer (JUICE) interstellar spacecraft in 2023.

=== Commercial performance ===
In Spain, "El universo sobre mí" debuted at the top of the Spanish chart on 6 March 2005, where it stayed for three weeks. As of December 2025, the song remains their only number-one single in the country. The Productores de Música de España certified the song platinum in 2024, denoting sales of 60,000 copies. In the United States, it peaked at number 43 on the Billboard's Hot Latin Tracks chart on 2 July 2005.

=== Charts ===
| Chart (2005) | Peak position |
|---|---|
| Spain (PROMUSICAE) | 1 |
| US Hot Latin Songs (Billboard) | 43 |

=== Certifications ===
Certifications and sales for "El universo sobre mí"
| Region | Certification | Certified units/sales |
|---|---|---|
| Spain (PROMUSICAE) | Platinum | 60,000^{‡} |
^{‡} Sales+streaming figures based on certification alone.

== See also ==
- List of number-one singles of 2005 (Spain)
