= Amaral =

Amaral may refer to:

- Amaral (band), a music group from Zaragoza, Spain
  - Amaral (album), its debut album
- Amaral (surname), a Portuguese-language surname
- Amaral (crater), a crater on Mercury
- Azal tinto, also known as Amaral, a wine variety
