= Papitwo =

Studio album by Miguel Bosé
- Released: 3 September 2012
- Recorded: 2012
- Genre: Latin Pop
- Language: Spanish and English
- Label: WEA Latina

Miguel Bosé chronology
Cardio (2010)	Papitwo (2012)	Amo (2014)

Singles from Papitwo
- 1. "Linda" Released: September 3, 2012

Papitwo (Daddytwo) is an album released by Spanish pop singer Miguel Bosé after the success of his first duet album, Papito. The album includes 14 tracks of previously known hit songs by the artist, in reworked versions in collaboration with many artists including Juanes, Alejandro Sanz, Pablo Alborán, Ximena Sariñana and other great Latin artists.

== Singles ==
- "Linda" was released as the album's lead single on 3 September 2012.

== Track listing ==
Album CD

1. Linda (feat. Malú)
2. Aire Soy (feat. Ximena Sariñana)
3. Creo en Ti (feat. Juan Luis Guerra)
4. Decirnos Adiós (feat. Penélope Cruz)
5. Con las Ganas de Decirte (feat. Helen de Quiroga)
6. Partisano (feat. Juanes)
7. Puede Que (feat. Pablo Alborán)
8. Mirarte (feat. Jovanotti)
9. Sol Forastero (feat. Joaquin Sabina)
10. Te Digo Amor (feat. Dani Martin)
11. Amiga (feat. Tiziano Ferro)
12. Shoot Me In the Back (feat. Bimba Bosé)
13. Duende (feat. Aleks Syntek)
14. Te Comería el Corazón (feat. Alejandro Sanz)

Bonus CD (only on Deluxe Edition)

1. Sea lo que sea será (feat. Above & Beyond)
2. Wrong in the right way (feat. Spankox)
3. Switch (feat. Frank Quintero)
4. Amor del bueno (feat. Reyli)
5. Lo noto (feat. Hombres G)
6. De mi lado (feat. Ana Torroja)
7. Iruten ari nuzu (feat. Kepa Junkera)
8. Encontrarás (feat. Natasha St. Pier)
9. Si no pueden quererte (feat. Natalia Lafourcade)
10. Dance! dance! dance! (feat. Marlango)
11. Espinita (feat. Albert Hammond)
12. Morir de amor (feat. Raphael)
13. Tres palabras (feat. Tania Libertad)
14. Tómbola (feat. Ana Belén)

== Studio Personnel ==
Recorded By: Pepo Scherman

Mixed By: Andy Bradfield

Mastered By: Antonio Baglio

== Charts ==
=== Weekly charts ===
Weekly chart performance for Papitwo
Chart (2012)	Peak position
Italian Albums (FIMI)	17
Mexican Album Chart	1
Spanish Albums (Promusicae)	1

=== Year-end charts ===
Year-end chart performance for Papitwo
Chart (2012)	Position
Spanish Albums (PROMUSICAE)	15
Chart (2013)	Position
Spanish Albums (PROMUSICAE)	37

== Certifications ==
Region	Certification	Certified units/sales
Mexico (AMPROFON)	2× Platinum+Gold	150,000^{^}
Spain (Promusicae)	Platinum	40,000^{^}
^{^} Shipments figures based on certification alone.
