= Encadenados (song) =

Encadenados (Eng.: Chained) is the title of a very popular song written by Carlos Arturo Briz Bremauntz. This track has been recorded by a handful of artist including: Gualberto Castro, Luis Miguel, Nana Caymmi, Óscar Chávez, Dyango, Alejandro Fernández, Los Hermanos Reyes, Luishino, Armando Manzanero, Mina, Moncho, Los Montejo, Nelson Ned, Orquesta El Equipo, Ángel Parra, Anthony Ríos, María Martha Serra Lima, Sonora Maracaibo, Los Terrícolas, Trío Irakitan, Trío Los Panchos and Chavela Vargas. The version by Lucho Gatica is featured in Pedro Almodóvar's movie Entre tinieblas (Dark Habits).

== Chavela Vargas and Miguel Bosé version ==
"Encadenados"

Song by Chavela Vargas featuring Miguel Bosé

from the album Papito Special Edition CD2
- Released: 1998
- Genre: Pop
- Songwriter: Carlos Arturo Briz Bremauntz
- Producer: Juan Carlos Calderón

This song was recorded by Chavela Vargas and Miguel Bosé in 1998 for her album Chavela Vargas. The track was produced by Juan Carlos Calderón. The album was re-released on September 27, 2004 and the track was later included on the special edition of Bosé's album Papito.
