= Como un Lobo =

"Como Un Lobo"

Single by Miguel Bosé

from the album Papito
- Released: September 2007 (Spain)
- Recorded: 2007
- Genre: Pop rock, electropop
- Length: 3:35
- Songwriters: Miguel Bosé; G. Vanni; C. D'Onofrio; P. Costa; M. Tazzi; M. Ogletree
- Producers: Miguel Bosé and Carlos Jean

Miguel Bosé singles chronology
"Morenamia" (2007)	"Como Un Lobo" (2007)	"Hacer por hacer (con Gloria Gaynor)" (2007)

"Como Un Lobo" (Eng.: Like a Wolf) was first released as a single in 1988. The song was written by Miguel Bosé, G. Vanni, C. D'Onofrio, P. Costa, M. Tazzi and M. Ogletree, and was included on Bose's 1987 studio album XXX.

== Miguel Bosé & Bimba Bosé version ==
The same song was reworked with a collaboration from Bosé's niece Bimba Bosé for his 2007 duets album Papito. On September 17, 2007, the video for this track (directed by Diego Postigo) was released.

== Charts ==
Weekly chart performance for "Como Un Lobo"
Chart (2007)	Peak position
Mexico (Monitor Latino)	7
US Hot Latin Songs (Billboard)	49
