= Salto al color =

Studio album by Amaral
- Released: 6 September 2019
- Recorded: Madrid
- Length: 41:01
- Language: Spanish; Galician
- Label: Sony Music; Discos Antártida; Gatorama Music S.L.
- Producer: Eva Amaral; Juan Aguirre

Amaral chronology
Nocturnal (2015)	Salto al color (2019)

Salto al color is the eighth studio album by the Spanish band Amaral. The songs were composed by Eva Amaral and Juan Aguirre except "Ondas Do Mar De Vigo", which was composed by Martin Códax. Eva Amaral, who sings and plays the guitar, and Juan Aguirre, who plays acoustic, electric and Portuguese guitars, both took charge of the production. The programming was by Eva Amaral, Juan Aguirre, Amit Kewalramani and Pablo Gareta. The keyboard and piano is played by Tomás Virgós while Chris Taylor and Ricardo Esteban both play the banjo. The percussion is by Tino di Geraldo and Álex Moreno, the latter of whom also plays the drums. The album also features a string orchestra, which was recorded at Angel Recording Studios in London.

It is the third album released under the label created by the duo, Discos Antártida. It was released on 6 September 2019 and includes 13 tracks. In the week of its release, it reached number one on the Spanish albums chart.

== Track listing ==
No.	Title	Writer(s)	Length
1.	"Ondas Do Mar De Vigo" (Waves of the Sea of Vigo)	Martin Códax	1:52
2.	"Mares Igual Que Tú" (Seas Just Like You)	Eva Amaral, Juan Aguirre	3:39
3.	"Señales" (Signs)	Eva Amaral, Juan Aguirre	3:05
4.	"Nuestro Tiempo" (Our Time)	Eva Amaral, Juan Aguirre	3:13
5.	"Bien Alta La Mirada" (Head Held High)	Eva Amaral, Juan Aguirre	3:03
6.	"Peces de Colores" (Colorful Fish)	Eva Amaral, Juan Aguirre	2:55
7.	"Tambores de la Rebelión" (Drums of Rebellion)	Eva Amaral, Juan Aguirre	2:55
8.	"Soledad" (Solitude)	Eva Amaral, Juan Aguirre	3:13
9.	"Juguetes Rotos" (Broken Toys)	Eva Amaral, Juan Aguirre	3:38
10.	"Ruido" (Noise)	Eva Amaral, Juan Aguirre	2:49
11.	"Lluvia" (Rain)	Eva Amaral, Juan Aguirre	3:25
12.	"Entre la Multitud" (Amongst the Crowd)	Eva Amaral, Juan Aguirre	3:45
13.	"Halconera" (Falconer)	Eva Amaral, Juan Aguirre	2:26

== Charts ==
=== Weekly charts ===
Weekly chart performance for Salto al Color
Chart (2019)	Peak position
Spanish Albums (PROMUSICAE)	1

=== Year-end charts ===
Year-end chart performance for Salto al Color
Chart (2019)	Position
Spanish Albums (PROMUSICAE)	17
Chart (2020)	Position
Spanish Albums (PROMUSICAE)	51

== Certifications ==
Certifications for "Salto al color"
Region	Certification	Certified units/sales
Spain (PROMUSICAE)	Gold	20,000^{‡}
^{‡} Sales+streaming figures based on certification alone.
