= Hacia lo salvaje =

Studio album by Amaral
- Released: 27 September 2011
- Recorded: Madrid
- Genres: Folk rock; Rock
- Language: Spanish
- Label: Discos Antártida / Gatorama Music S.L.
- Producers: Eva Amaral, Juan Aguirre and Juan de Dios Martín

Amaral chronology
Gato negro dragón rojo (2005)	Hacia lo salvaje (2011)	Nocturnal (2015)

Hacia lo salvaje (Into the wild) is the sixth studio album by the Spanish band Amaral. The songs were recorded in the duo's Madrid studio by Eva Amaral and Juan Aguirre, with the participation of Toni Toledo and Chris Taylor. The production was undertaken by Juan de Dios Martín, Eva Amaral and Juan Aguirre. Antonio Escobar was the synthesizer programmer. The album was mixed and mastered in New York by Michael Brauer in Electric Lady and Greg Calbi in Sterling Sound. It was the first album published under the new label created by the duo, Antártida, which was named after the song that the band were currently working on when they realised that they had not yet given their new label a name. Acoustic versions of all the songs were also recorded and released as bonus material

The album was received positively by critics and became a gold record (30,000 copies sold) in its first week, putting it at number one in the list of music sales in Spain for four weeks running. In November 2011, the album reached the status of platinum record (40,000 copies sold) in January 2012 was a certified triple gold record (60,000 copies sold), as well as being awarded Double Silver by the Independent Music Companies Association (IMPALA). "Hacia lo salvaje" was chosen as the third most important Spanish album of 2011 by the magazine Rolling Stone as well as achieving the "Rolling Stone Prize" for Best song for the track "Hacia lo salvaje", which was also considered by the same publication as "one of the most epic rock songs".

== Editions ==
The album was published in three different physical formats, as well as a digital download:

- The complete album (1 CD) which gives access to a digital download of the acoustic versions of all tracks.
- Digibook edition, which includes Hacia lo salvaje and all the acoustic tracks on a second CD. It also included all the illustrations drawn for the album by Borja Bonafuente Gonzalo and photographs of the band by Juan Pérez Fajardo.
- Vinyl edition, which includes the album on a 180-gram vinyl, the album on CD and access to a digital download of the acoustic versions.

== Singles ==
The first single from the album, "Hacia lo salvaje", reached number one on iTunes in just one day. The track met a mixed reception, though largely positive. The track's official video, directed and produced by Titán Pozo in Guatemala in September 2011, was released the same day as the album. However, in August 2015, the band withdrew the video after investigating the suspected illegal trafficking of the turtles used in filming

On 12 December "Cuando suba la marea" was announced as the second single, during an acoustic performance of the song on Spanish television on 3 December 2011. On 27 February 2012 the band released the music video, which was produced by Lyona and filmed in different locations in Catalonia at the end of January 2012.

The third single was "Hoy es el principio del final", for which filming on the music video began in April 2012, directed by Alberto Van Stokkum in Mongolia. The video was shot in and around Ulaanbaatar and featured two Mongolian actors, Khulan Bazarvaani and Tuguldur Batbayar. The video had been intended to express "the precise moment in which the world is split in half and, the resulting breakdown and internal conflict. A psychological tug of war between what is known and experienced(the city), and the longing for freedom and the unexplored (the forest)". The video was released on 4 June 2012 to coincide with the launch of the single. It was played live for the first time on television on the debut of Buenas noches y Buenafuente, a comedy program on Spain's Antena 3, a performance which Rolling Stone qualified as "brilliant", "sublime" and "spectacular", despite labelling the song "one of the weakest tracks" of the album, nonetheless highlighting Eva Amaral's "extraordinary falsetto".

== Track listing ==
No.	Title	Writer(s)	Length
1.	"Hacia lo salvaje" (Into the wild)	Eva Amaral, Juan Aguirre	4:14
2.	"Antártida" (Antarctica)	Eva Amaral, Juan Aguirre	4:16
3.	"Si las calles pudieran hablar" (If the streets could talk)	Eva Amaral, Juan Aguirre	3:02
4.	"Esperando un resplandor" (Waiting for a light)	Eva Amaral, Juan Aguirre	3:03
5.	"Robin Hood"	Eva Amaral, Juan Aguirre	3:07
6.	"Riazor"	Eva Amaral, Juan Aguirre	4:06
7.	"Montaña rusa" (Rollercoaster)	Eva Amaral, Juan Aguirre	3:09
8.	"Olvido" (Forgetting)	Eva Amaral, Juan Aguirre	3:11
9.	"Cuando suba la marea" (When the tide rises)	Eva Amaral, Juan Aguirre	4:25
10.	"Como un martillo en la pared" (Like a hammer in the wall)	Eva Amaral, Juan Aguirre	2:58
11.	"Hoy es el principio del final" (Today is the start of the end)	Eva Amaral, Juan Aguirre	4:13
12.	"Van como locos" (They go like madmen)	Eva Amaral, Juan Aguirre	3:32

== Charts ==
=== Weekly charts ===
Weekly chart performance for Hacia lo Salvaje
Chart (2011)	Peak position
Spanish Albums (Promusicae)	1

=== Year-end charts ===
Year-end chart performance for Hacia lo Salvaje
Chart (2011)	Position
Spanish Albums (PROMUSICAE)	8
Chart (2012)	Position
Spanish Albums (PROMUSICAE)	30

== Certifications ==
Region	Certification	Certified units/sales
Spain (Promusicae)	Platinum	60,000^{^}
^{^} Shipments figures based on certification alone.
