= Si Todos Fuesen Iguales a Ti =

"Si Todos Fuesen Iguales a Ti • Se Todos Fossem Igual a Você"

Song by Rosa León featuring Miguel Bosé

from the album Papito Special Edition CD 2
- Released: 1992
- Genre: Pop
- Length: 3:49
- Songwriter(s): Vinicius de Moraes and Antonio Carlos Jobim
- Producer(s): Rosa León and Alberto Estébanez

Si Todos Fuesen Iguales a Ti (English: If Everyone were like you; Portuguese: Se Todos Fossem Igual a Você) is a song written by Vinicius de Moraes, Antonio Carlos Jobim and adapted by David Trueba. This version is performed by Rosa León and Miguel Bosé and was first included on León's album Ay Amor! in 1992. Miguel Bosé later included this track on the special edition of his album Papito.
