= Corazones (song) =

2000 song by Miguel Bosé featuring Ana Torroja

Song by Miguel Bosé featuring Ana Torroja

from the album Papito Special Edition CD 2
- Released: 2000
- Genre: Pop
- Length: 3:51
- Songwriter(s): Ana Torroja, Lanfranco Ferrario, Massimo Grillo and Miguel Bosé
- Producer(s): Greg Walsh

Corazones (Eng.: Hearts) is a song written by Ana Torroja, Lanfranco Ferrario, Massimo Grillo and Miguel Bosé. The song is a live recording taken from GiraDos En Concierto, an album released by Bosé and Torroja in 2000. Is the only new song included on the setlist of a very successful worldwide tour by both performers.

The track was later included on Torroja's compilation album Essential in 2004 and in 2007 on Bosé's Papito Special Edition.

== Chart performance ==
Chart (2000)	Peak
Billboard Latin Pop Airplay	28
