= 1997 (disambiguation) =

1997 was a common year starting on Wednesday of the Gregorian calendar.

1997 may also refer to:

- 1997 (band), an American band active between 2005 and 2010
- "1997", a song by Amaral from Amaral, 1998
- "1997", a song by Key Glock from Yellow Tape, 2020
