= Cardio =

Cardio (from Greek καρδίᾱ kardia, 'heart') may refer to:

- Of the Heart
- Cardiology
  - Cardiovascular system
- Cardiovascular fitness
- Aerobic exercise, also known as cardio
- Cardio (album), a 2010 album by Miguel Bosé

== See also ==
- Physical exercise
