= Girados en Concierto =

Girados en Concierto (Girados Live)

Live album by Miguel Bosé and Ana Torroja
- Released: in the U.S.: May 14th, 2002
- Recorded: 2000
- Genre: Pop
- Label: Warner Music Latina

Miguel Bosé and Ana Torroja chronology
Lo mejor de Bosé (1999)	Girados en Concierto (Girados Live) (2002)	Sereno (2001)

Ana Torroja chronology
Pasajes de un sueño (1999)	Girados en Concierto (2002)	Ana Torroja (2001)

Girados en Concierto (Girados Live) is a live-concert double-album by Latin Grammy-winning Spanish musician and actor, Miguel Bosé and Spanish singer Ana Torroja, formerly of the group Mecano. It was released in the U.S. on May 14, 2002. The only completely new song on the album is Corazones (Hearts), a duet written and performed by both; the rest are hits from each of their respective careers. In the case of Torroja the songs include solo hits as well as from her years with Mecano.

== Track listing ==
CD 1:

1. "Un año más" (Torroja)
2. "Hoy no me puedo levantar" (Torroja)
3. "Como sueñan las sirenas" (Torroja)
4. "Salamandra" (Bosé)
5. "Bambú" (Bosé)
6. "Nena" (Bosé)
7. "Muro" (Bosé / backup vocals by Torroja)
8. "Mujer contra mujer" (Torroja)
9. "Ya no te quiero" (Torroja)
10. "Dulce pesadilla" (Dúo)
11. "Hacer por hacer" (Bosé)
12. "Si tú no vuelves" (Bosé)
13. "El siete de septiembre" (Torroja)

CD 2:

1. "Duende" (Dúo)
2. "Barco a Venus" (Torroja)
3. "A contratiempo" (Torroja)
4. "Sol forastero" (Bosé / 2° voz Torroja)
5. "Nada particular" (Dúo)
6. "La belleza" (Bosé)
7. "Hijo de la Luna" (Torroja)
8. "Amante bandido" (Bosé / 2° voz Torroja)
9. "Diosa del cobre" (Torroja / 2° voz en coros Bosé)
10. "Corazones" (Dúo)

== Certifications ==
Region	Certification	Certified units/sales
Chile	2× Platinum	50,000
Spain (PROMUSICAE)	Platinum	100,000^{^}
^{^} Shipments figures based on certification alone.
