= Nocturnal (Amaral album) =

Studio album by Amaral
- Released: 30 October 2015
- Recorded: Madrid
- Genre: Indie rock; rock; alternative
- Length: 54:23
- Language: Spanish
- Label: Discos Antártida / Gatorama Music S.L.
- Producer: Eva Amaral, Juan Aguirre and Chris Taylor

Amaral chronology
Hacia lo salvaje (2011)	Nocturnal (2015)	Salto al color (2019)

Nocturnal is the seventh studio album by Spanish band Amaral. The songs were composed by Eva Amaral and Juan Aguirre, while the recording included the participation of Guillermo Quero as the sound and mixing engineer, Toni Toledo and Ged Lynch playing the drums, Chris Taylor on the bass and Tomás Virgos on the piano. Also, Nus Cuevas contributed an arrangement of strings, Abraham Boba played the organ for one of the songs, and John Calvert and David Antony Brinkworth, along with Eva and Juan themselves, undertook the synth programming. Eva Amaral and Juan Aguirre also took charge of the production, along with Chris Taylor.

It is the second album published under the label created by the duo, Discos Antártida. It went on sale on 30 October 2015 and includes 14 tracks. In the week of its release, it reached number one for bestselling albums in Spain and, on 18 December 2015, the album was recognised as a gold record after reaching 20,000 sales.

== Track listing ==
No.	Title	Writer(s)	Length
1.	"Llévame muy lejos" (Take me far away)	Eva Amaral, Juan Aguirre	5:36
2.	"Obertura (Unas veces se gana…)" (Opening (Sometimes you win…))	Eva Amaral, Juan Aguirre	1:30
3.	"Unas veces se gana y otras se pierde" (Sometimes you know and others you lose)	Eva Amaral, Juan Aguirre	3:50
4.	"Nocturnal" (Nocturnal)	Eva Amaral, Juan Aguirre	3:27
5.	"La ciudad maldita" (The cursed city)	Eva Amaral, Juan Aguirre	4:18
6.	"Lo que nos mantiene unidos" (What keeps us together)	Eva Amaral, Juan Aguirre	4:18
7.	"500 vidas" (500 lives)	Eva Amaral, Juan Aguirre	4:17
8.	"Cazador" (Hunter)	Eva Amaral, Juan Aguirre	3:59
9.	"Nadie nos recordará" (No one will remember us)	Eva Amaral, Juan Aguirre	3:58
10.	"La niebla" (Fog)	Eva Amaral, Juan Aguirre	3:54
11.	"Laberintos" (Labyrinths)	Eva Amaral, Juan Aguirre	3:29
12.	"Chatarra" (Scrap)	Eva Amaral, Juan Aguirre	3:45
13.	"En el tiempo equivocado" (In the wrong time)	Eva Amaral, Juan Aguirre	4:53
14.	"Noche de cuchillos" (Night of knives)	Eva Amaral, Juan Aguirre	3:09

== Charts ==
=== Weekly charts ===
Weekly chart performance for Nocturnal
Chart (2015)	Peak position
Spanish Albums (PROMUSICAE)	3

=== Year-end charts ===
Year-end chart performance for Nocturnal
Chart (2015)	Position
Spanish Albums (PROMUSICAE)	36
Chart (2016)	Position
Spanish Albums (PROMUSICAE)	38

== Certifications ==
Certifications for Nocturnal
Region	Certification	Certified units/sales
Spain (PROMUSICAE)	Gold	20,000^{‡}
^{‡} Sales+streaming figures based on certification alone.
