= Por vos muero =

Por Vos Muero

Studio album by Miguel Bosé
- Released: 20 April 2004
- Recorded: Willows Mead, London and Sintonía, Madrid
- Genre: Pop
- Length: 50:31
- Label: Warner Music Latina
- Producer: Miguel Bosé and Chris Cameron

Miguel Bosé chronology
Sereno (2001)	Por Vos Muero (2004)	Velvetina (2005)

Por Vos Muero (I Die for You) is the 15th studio album by Latin Grammy-winning Spanish musician and actor Miguel Bosé. It was released in April 2004.

== Track listing ==
1. "El Ilusionista"
2. "Olvidame tu"
3. "Levantate y olvida"
4. "Amiga (gracias por venir...)"
5. "A una dama"
6. "Amiga"
7. "Vagabundo"
8. "De momento no"
9. "Habana"
10. "Por vos muero"
