= Laberinto =

Studio album by Miguel Bosé
- Released: November 28, 1995
- Recorded: 1994–1995
- Genre: Art pop
- Length: 63:52
- Label: WEA Latina; Warner Music Netherlands

Miguel Bosé chronology
Bajo el signo de Caín (1993)	Laberinto (1995)	11 maneras de ponerse un sombrero (1998)

Singles from Laberinto
- 1. "No Encuentro Un Momento Pa' Olvidar" Released: 1995; 2. "Tesoro (Pudo Ser Tu Nombre...)" Released: 1996; 3. "La Auto-Radio Canta" Released: 1996

Laberinto (Edicion Especial)

Singles from Laberinto (Edición Especial)
- 1. "Este Mundo Va" Released: 1995

Laberinto (Labyrinth) is the twelfth studio album by Latin Grammy-winning Spanish musician and actor, Miguel Bosé, and his sixth with Warner Bros. Records (Warner Music Latina in the U.S.). It was released in 1995. Laberinto 2 is a Limited-Edition album, released in 1996.

== Track listing for Laberinto ==
Laberinto
No.	Title	Length
1.	"Agua Clara"	6:25
2.	"Tesoro (Pudo Ser Tu Nombre...)"	6:04
3.	"No Encuentro Un Momento Pa' Olvidar"	6:57
4.	"Corazón Tocao"	7:09
5.	"Azul de Louïe"	6:50
6.	"Un Dia Después la Historia Sigue Igual"	8:06
7.	"Te Buscaré"	4:44
8.	"La Auto-Radio Canta"	4:16
9.	"¡Ay!"	6:43
10.	"Sequía"	6:29

== Track listing for Laberinto 2 ==
1. "Este Mundo Va"
2. "Agua Clara"
3. "Tesoro (Pudo Ser Tu Nombre...)"
4. "No Encuentro Un Momento Pa' Olvidar"
5. "Corazón Tocao"
6. "Amor Entero"
7. "Azul de Louïe"
8. "Un Dia Después la Historia Sigue Igual"
9. "Te Buscaré"
10. "La Auto-Radio Canta"
11. "¡Ay!"
12. "Sequía"
13. "Nunca Sabré"

== Certifications and sales ==
Region	Certification	Certified units/sales
Mexico	—	60,000
Spain (PROMUSICAE)	Platinum	100,000
Summaries
Worldwide	—	1,000,000
