= Linda (Pooh song) =

1976 song

Single by I Pooh

from the album Poohlover
- B-side: "Donna davvero"
- Released: 21 July 1976
- Length: 3:42
- Label: CBS Records
- Songwriters: Roby Facchinetti; Valerio Negrini

Music video
- "Linda" on YouTube

"Linda" (female name) is a song by Italian rock band, Pooh. It was composed by Roby Facchinetti and Valerio Negrini some time before, but was released in 1976, and became the lead single on the album, Poohlover.

It seems that the song is inspired by the American model Linda Larsen, who appeared in I Pooh's television special filmed in Sperlonga in 1975, on the occasion of the album Un po' del nostro tempo migliore and broadcast by RAI on 3 October of that year.

The song was presented at Festivalbar 1976, and was the group's first recording after the breakup with their producer, Giancarlo Lucariello, who generally opposed the development of rock arrangements.

== Miguel Bosé version ==
"Linda"

Single by Miguel Bosé

from the album Linda
- Released: April 1977
- Recorded: February – March 1977
- Studio: Studi GRS, Milan; Studi CBS, Milan; Estudios Sonoland, Madrid
- Length: 3:42
- Label: CBS Records
- Songwriters: Roby Facchinetti; Valerio Negrini; Luis Gómez-Escolar

Music video
- "Linda" on YouTube

Translated into Spanish, Linda also achieved widespread popularity in Spain and South America thanks to the version by Miguel Bosé, who was a little-known singer at the time, but who would soon make headlines.

Linda is the title-track to Bosé's debut album, a record in which other Italian songs translated into Spanish were featured. Pooh also recorded a Spanish version, still titled "Linda", but with different lyrics than Bosé's version.

== Miguel Bosé and Malú version ==
"Linda"

Single by Miguel Bosé featuring Malú

from the album Papitwo
- Released: September 3, 2012
- Recorded: 2012
- Genre: Latin pop
- Length: 3:53
- Label: WEA Latina
- Songwriters: Roby Facchinetti, Victor Millrose, Valerio Negrini, Lenore Rosenblatt

Music video
- "Linda" on YouTube

In 2012 a version featuring Malú, a Spanish multi-selling singer, was released as the first single from his second duets album Papitwo (2012). The song was released for digital download on September 3, 2012.

== Charts ==
I Pooh version
Chart (1976–77)	Peak position
Italy (Musica e dischi)	1

Miguel Bosé version
Chart (1977–78)	Peak position
Argentina (CAPIF)	7
Spain (AFYVE)	1

Miguel Bosé and Malú version
Chart (2012)	Peak position
Spain (PROMUSICAE)	18
