= Sereno (album) =

Studio album by Miguel Bosé
- Released: January 29, 2002
- Recorded: La Cuadra and Sintonía, Madrid
- Genre: Latin pop
- Length: 50:24
- Label: WEA Latina
- Producer: Greg Walsh · Peter Walsh

Miguel Bosé chronology
Girados (2000)	Sereno (2002)	Por vos muero (2004)

Sereno (Serene) is the 14th studio album by Latin Grammy-winning Spanish musician and actor Miguel Bosé. It was released by WEA Latina on January 29, 2002.

== Track listing ==
1. "Puede Que"
2. "Gulliver"
3. "Mirarte"
4. "El Hijo del Capitán Trueno"
5. "Te Digo Amor"
6. "Tic Tac"
7. "Mientras Respire"
8. "Morena Mía"
9. "La Noche Me Gusta"
10. "A Millones de km. de Aquí"
11. "Sereno"

== Sales and certifications ==
Region	Certification	Certified units/sales
Mexico (AMPROFON)	Gold	75,000^{^}
Spain (PROMUSICAE)	2× Platinum	200,000^{^}
^{^} Shipments figures based on certification alone.
