= Estrella de mar =

Studio album by Amaral
- Released: Spain 4 February 2002; 25 February 2003; Latin American edition 24 February 2004
- Recorded: 2001; The Dairy Studios; London, England; Terry Britten Studios; London, England; Sony Music Studios; London, England
- Genres: Pop rock; folk rock
- Length: 52:00
- Labels: Virgin, EMI
- Producers: Cameron Jenkins; Amaral; Guillermo Quero

Amaral chronology
Una pequeña parte del mundo (2000)	Estrella de mar (2002)	Pájaros en la cabeza (2005)

Estrella de mar (English: Starfish) is the third studio album by the Spanish folk rock group Amaral released in Spain during 2002. Led by the first single and #1 hit "Sin Ti No Soy Nada", Estrella de Mar became the duo's breakthrough album, selling more than 1 million copies in Spain alone. "Te necesito", "Moriría por vos" (based upon the film Leaving Las Vegas), "Salir corriendo" and "Toda la noche en la calle" were also very successful singles in Spain, all four reaching number one. The album received a nomination for a Latin Grammy Award for Best Pop Album by a Duo or Group with Vocals. An English version of Estrella de Mar was released in the United Kingdom in July 2006, exclusively on iTunes.

== Track listing ==
All tracks composed by Amaral

1. "Sin ti no soy nada" (I'm Nothing Without You) – 4:28
2. "Moriría por vos" (I'd Die for You) – 3:47
3. "Toda la noche en la calle" (Out All Night) – 3:47
4. "Te necesito" (I Need You) – 4:23
5. "¿Qué será?" (What Will It Be?) – 3:21
6. "Salir corriendo" (Run Away) – 4:11
7. "Estrella de mar" (Starfish) – 4:21
8. "Rosa de la paz" (Rose of Peace) – 5:03
9. "No sabe dónde va" (She Doesn't Know Where She's Going') – 3:24
10. "De la noche a la mañana" (Overnight) – 3:07
11. "El centro de mis ojos" (Center of My Eyes) - 3:54
12. "En sólo un segundo" (In Just One Second) – 8:31

=== Estrella de mar (Latin American edition) ===
13. "Te necesito" [con Beto Cuevas] – 4:04
14. "Sin ti no soy nada" [acústico]- 4:28
15. "Moriría por vos" [acústico] – 3:52
16. "En sólo un segundo" [acústico] – 5:15

=== Estrella de mar (Italian edition) ===
13. "Di Te Ho Bisogno" - 4:26
14. "Senza Te Sono Niente" - 4:28

=== Estrella de mar (French edition) ===
1. "Les Sentiments Ne Se Réparent Pas" - 4:28

== Singles ==
- 2002 - Sin Ti No Soy Nada #1 (SPA)
- 2002 - Te Necesito #1 (SPA) #15 (MEX)
- 2002 - Toda la noche en la calle #1 (SPA)
- 2003 - Moriría por Vos #1 (SPA)
- 2003 - Estrella de mar
- 2003 - Salir corriendo #1 (SPA)

== Personnel ==
- Eva Amaral – vocalist
- Juan Aguirre – guitarist
