= Bandido (Miguel Bosé album) =

- Official artwork for all formats and releases

Studio album by Miguel Bosé
- Released: November 7, 1984
- Recorded: 1984
- Genre: New wave, pop
- Length: 43:05
- Language: Spanish • Italian
- Label: CBS, Epic
- Producer: Bosé, Roberto Colombo
- Compiler: Miguel Bosé

Miguel Bosé's releases chronology chronology
Made in Spain (1983)	Bandido (1984)	Salamandra (1986)

Singles from Bandido
- 1. "Sevilla" Released: September 3, 1984; 2. "Amante Bandido" Released: January 7, 1985; 3. "Lento" Released: April 29, 1985

Bandido (Spanish for Bandit) is the seventh studio album by Spanish singer Miguel Bosé, released on November 7, 1984, by CBS and Epic.

The album represented the artist's comeback in 1984 after releasing his sixth studio album Made in Spain in 1983. In this project, Bosé got more involved in his musical career and changed his style into a more mature lyric style as well as complex sound.

Bandido was a commercial success, selling 100,000 pure copies in Spain as of 1984, a personal record for Bosé at the time. It spawned three singles, "Sevilla", "Amante Bandido" and "Lento", all of them receiving a good commercial reception in Spain and Latin America, especially the first two releases which peaked the Spanish airplay list in that same year.

In 2023, the singer released a film about the history between the record and Bosé's personal situation at the time.

== Background and release ==
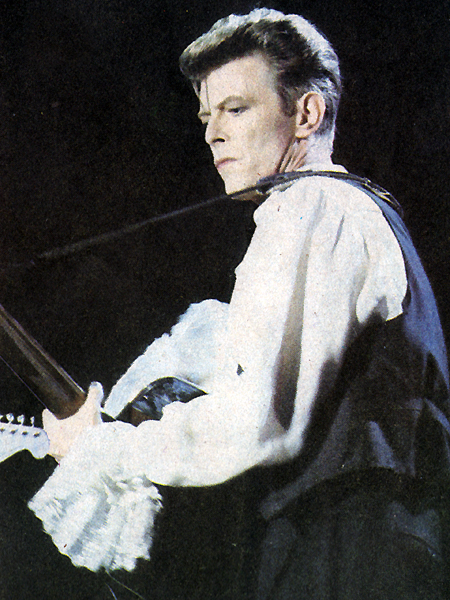
David Bowie served as an inspiration for Bandido's musical and photographic style.

At the time, Miguel Bosé was thinking of abandoning his musical career, but his signed contract with CBS required him to release one last album, so he started with the recording and production of Bandido, abandoning his romantic-ballad image while turning it into a new fresh sound closer to the modern sound and under the influence of British star artists at the time such as Depeche Mode or David Bowie, who influenced Bosé's new sound and album artwork inspired from Bowie's sixth studio album Aladdin Sane (1973).

The company released "Sevilla" as the first single of the album, to be presented in Seville on November 7, 1984.

== Track listing ==
No.	Title	Writer(s)	Length
1.	"Abrir y cerrar"	Piero Ameli; Miguel Bosé; Roberto Colombo	5:02
2.	"Horizonte de las estrellas"	Massimo Schiappadori; Bosé; Roberto Battaglia; R. Colombo	4:15
3.	"Amante bandido"	P. Ameli; Bosé; Sergio Cossu	4:24
4.	"Fiesta Siberiana"	P. Ameli; Bosé; S. Cossu	3:30
5.	"South of the Sahara"	Claudio D'onofrio; Giorgio Vanni; Peter Hammill; R. Colombo; S. Cossu	4:33
6.	"Sevilla"	Bosé; S. Cossu	4:45
7.	"Y fue"	C. D'Onofrio; G. Vanni; M. Schiappadori; Bosé; R. Battaglia	4:08
8.	"Lento"	P. Ameli; Bosé; R. Colombo	4:32
9.	"Esclavo de tus ojos"	M. Schiappadori; Bosé; R. Battaglia	4:06
10.	"Domine mundi"	P. Hammill; Riccardo Giagni	3:48

== Charts ==
Chart performance for Bandido
Chart (1984–85)	Peak position
Italian Albums (Musica e dischi)	7
