= Amo (Miguel Bosé album) =

Studio album by Miguel Bosé
- Released: 4 November 2014
- Recorded: 2014
- Genre: Latin pop; pop rock; soft rock
- Language: Spanish
- Label: WEA Latina
- Producer: Enzo Feliciati; Miguel Bosé; Roberto Colombo

Miguel Bosé chronology
Papitwo (2012)	Amo (2014)

Singles from Amo
- 1. "Encanto" Released: 2014; 2. "Libre Ya De Amores" Released: 2014; 3. "Amo" Released: 2014

Amo (English: "I love") is the eighteenth studio album of Spanish singer Miguel Bosé. The album received a Latin Grammy nomination for Best Contemporary Pop Vocal Album.

== Track listing ==
No.	Title	Writer(s)	Length
1.	"Encanto"	Massimo Grilli	4:10
2.	"Libre Ya de Amores"	Grilli	3:56
3.	"Amo"	Grilli	4:36
4.	"Solo Sí"	Grilli	4:07
5.	"Tú Mi Salvación"	F. Orti	4:38
6.	"Sí Se Puede"	Grilli	4:15
7.	"Los Amores Divididos"	M. Grilli; M. Bosé	5:33
8.	"Respirar"	Grilli	4:11
9.	"Un Nuevo Día"	Grilli	4:21
10.	"I Miss Your Face"	A. de Gregorio	3:24
11.	"Domingo"	Grilli	6:01

== Charts ==
=== Weekly charts ===
Weekly chart performance for Amo
Chart (2014–2015)	Peak position
Italian Albums (FIMI)	19
Spanish Albums (PROMUSICAE)	4
US Top Latin Albums (Billboard)	16
US Latin Pop Albums (Billboard)	4

=== Year-end charts ===
Year-end chart performance for Amo
Chart (2014)	Position
Spanish Albums (PROMUSICAE)	36
Chart (2015)	Position
Spanish Albums (PROMUSICAE)	39

== Certifications ==
Certifications for Amo
Region	Certification	Certified units/sales
Spain (PROMUSICAE)	Gold	20,000^{‡}
^{‡} Sales+streaming figures based on certification alone.
