= Velvetina =

Studio album by Miguel Bosé
- Released: February 8, 2005
- Recorded: Willows Mead, London, Sintonía Studios Spain
- Genre: Pop, EDM
- Length: 1:07:04
- Label: Warner Music
- Producer: Antonio Cortes

Miguel Bosé chronology
| Por vos muero (2004) | Velvetina (2005) | Papito (2007) |

Velvetina (Velvetine) is an album released in 2005 by the Spanish-Italian singer Miguel Bosé. Bosé has not yet made it clear whether the name was inspired by the Australian-manufactured decorative finish that describes itself as "a strong, fine-grained decorative plaster finish with a distinctive velvety appearance". The album was released in Spain as an audio CD, and as a special edition for the Creative Zen which featured audio, a video clip for each of the 13 songs and photography.

The album is an example of Miguel Bosé's innovative style; with Velvetina he blended Latin pop music with trip hop and electronic dance. Speaking of producing this album he said "Fue un trabajo muy interesante y estimulante, vamos, un reto." (It was interesting and stimulating work, yes, a challenge). Personnel include Miguel Bosé as the main vocalist and instrumentalist, with Helen de Quiroga doing backup vocals and Antonio Cortés playing various instruments on the album.

== Track list ==
1. Ojalá Ojalá (Hopefully, Hopefully) (4:43)
2. Aun Más (Even More) (4:53)
3. No Se Trata De (It is Not About) (4:46)
4. Hey Max (Hey Max) (4:38)
5. Celeste Amor (Celestial Love) (4:21)
6. Ella Dijo No (She Said No) (4:42)
7. De La Mano De Dios (From the Hand of God) (4:02)
8. La Tropa Del Rey (The King's Troop) (4:51)
9. Verde Canalla (Green Scoundrel/Swine) (4:48)
10. Paro El Horizonte (I Stop the Horizon) (3:39)
11. Down With Love (Down with Love) (4:33)
12. Tu Mano Dirá (Your Hand will Tell) (4:42)
13. May Day (May Day) (4:35)
14. Remix (Ella Dijo No) (She Said No) (7:49)

== Singles ==
Two singles were released from Velvetina.

- The first was "Down With Love", the video clip was vetoed in some countries as it contained references to the famous porn artist Nacho Vidal.
- The second single was "Hey Max", the music video of which was directed by the acclaimed Spanish artist Jaume de La Iguana.
