= Chicas! =

Studio album by Miguel Bosé
- Released: 1 March 1979
- Studio: CBS Studios, London; GRS Studios, Milan; Estudios Eurosonic, Madrid; Musicland, Munich
- Length: 41:26
- Language: Spanish; English; Italian
- Label: CBS

Miguel Bosé chronology
Miguel Bosé (1978)	Chicas! (1979)	Miguel (1980)

Singles from Salamandra
- 1. "Creo en ti" Released: 1979; 2. "Super Superman" Released: 1979; 3. "Deja que..." Released: 1980

Chicas! (English: Girls) is the third studio album by Spanish-Italian musician and actor Miguel Bosé. It was released through CBS Records on 1 March 1979.

Compared to his previous albums, Chicas! includes songs of a youthful and pop nature, leaving ballads and romanticism aside; while it also includes some slow songs. Several of the songs on the album are recorded in the English language.

== Background ==
Upon concluding the tour in Spain and Italy to promote his previous LPs, the artist solidified his career in these countries. Consequently, he began to personally plan his next album. He convened with the producers and collaborators from his earlier records to select contemporary themes that aligned with the current musical landscape and reflect the artist's maturity.

Bosé recorded the tracks for this album at CBS Studios in London, GRS Studios in Milan, and Eurosonic in Madrid.

In mid-1979, he released his third LP, with the first single being "Creo en ti" as the lead single, a song dedicated to his fans and the youth audience. Writing of several tracks on this album, included work from José Luis Perales, Danilo Vanoa, Gian Pietro Felisatti, Fernando Arbex, and Sandro Giacobbe.

The album produced two additional singles: the upbeat track "Super, superman" and the ballad "Deja que...".

The album achieved remarkable success, further solidifying his career. The record label decided to re-release this LP in Italy, re-recording the tracks in Italian while retaining the original English versions, which also became a success in that market, reaching fourth in the weekly Italian albums charts.

This album features two different covers. The first edition, aimed at the Spanish market, depicts the artist facing forward with arms crossed, wearing a sweater tied around his neck. In a subsequent edition targeted at Spain, the Italian market, Europe, and Latin America, he is shown in profile, wearing a denim shirt.

== Track listing ==
Chicas! track listing
No.	Title	Writer(s)	Length
1.	"Vota Juan 26"	Miguel Bosé; Danilo Vanoa; Gian Pietro Felisatti	3:45
2.	"Super Superman"	Bosé; Vanoa; Felisatti	3:23
3.	"Si...Piensa En Mí"	Bosé; Vanoa; Felisatti	3:23
4.	"Mamma, Mamma"	Bosé; Vanoa; Felisatti	3:00
5.	"Creo En Tí"	Bosé; José Luis Perales	3:53
6.	"Perdón, Señor"	Bosé; Fernando Arbex	2:40
7.	"Shoot Me in the Back"	Arbex	4:51
8.	"Noche Blanca En Munich"	Bosé; Arbex	3:49
9.	"Seventeen"	Arbex	4:33
10.	"Winter Butterfly"	Arbex	3:37
11.	"Deja Que..."	Bosé; Sandro Giacobbe	3:37

== Charts ==
Chart performance for Chicas!
Chart (1979–1980)	Peak position
Italian Albums (Musica e dischi)	4
Spanish Albums (AFYVE)	7
