= Bajo el signo de Caín =

Studio album by Miguel Bosé
- Released: June 8, 1993
- Recorded: The River, Mayfair, London, England & Quarzo, Madrid, Spain
- Genre: Latin pop
- Length: 62:08
- Label: WEA Latina, Warner Music Netherlands
- Producer: Ross Cullum, Sandy McClelland; production assistant: Andy Ross

Miguel Bosé chronology
Directo 90 (1991)	Bajo el signo de Caín (1993)	Laberinto (1995)

Singles from Bajo el signo de Caín
- 1. "Si Tú No Vuelves"; 2. "Nada Particular"; 3. "Sol Forastero"; 4. "Te Comería El Corazón"; 5. "Sara"

Bajo el signo de Caín (English: Under the sign of Cain) is the twelfth album from Latin music singer-songwriter Miguel Bosé. Released on June 8, 1993, it was his fifth full-length album for the WEA Latina label.

== Track listing ==
No.	Title	Writer(s)	Length
1.	"Te Comería El Corazón"	Miguel Bosé; Ross Cullum; Sandy McLelland; Andy Ross	5:57
2.	"Lo Que Hay Es Lo Que Ves"	Bosé; Cullum; McLelland; Ross; Toulson-Clarke	5:40
3.	"Si Tú No Vuelves"	Bosé; Lanfranco Ferrario; Massimo Grilli	4:42
4.	"Nada Particular"	Bosé; Cullum; McLelland; Ross; Toulson-Clarke	6:02
5.	"Mayo"	Bosé; Ferrario; Grilli	4:20
6.	"Bajo el signo de Caín"	Bosé; Cullum; McLelland; Ross; Toulson-Clarke	5:17
7.	"Wako-Shaman"	Bosé; Cullum; McLelland; Toulson-Clarke	5:56
8.	"Imagínate Que Te Quiero"	Bosé; Cullum; McLelland; Ross	4:45
9.	"Sara"	Bosé; Cullum; McLelland; Ross; Toulson-Clarke	5:41
10.	"Sol Forastero"	Bosé; Ferrario; Grilli	4:11
11.	"La Americana"	Bosé; Ferrario; Grilli	4:43
12.	"Gota A Gota"	Bosé; Ferrario; Grilli	4:35

== Track Notes ==
As the lyrics are rather stream of consciousness, Bosé wrote a sentence or two as a dedication for certain people at the end of each song.

=== Te comería el corazón ===
- A ti que acabas de llegar...

No podré salir de este rincón más que a través de la espada y mirándote a los ojos. (To you who have just arrived in this world... I will not be able to leave except through the sword and staring at you in the eyes.)

=== Lo que hay es lo que ves ===
- A Javier, Edith & Manolo mis amigos del alma y de la carretera... y de muchas otras cosas más también. (To Javier, Edith & Manolo; my friends of the soul and highway... and many other things as well.)

=== Si tú no vuelves ===
- A la Mami y a Pablito, con ellas buscando estrellas. (To Mami and Pablito; with them looking for stars.)

=== Nada particular ===
- A Mahala, Javier, Pepe & Rafa porque con vosotros, nunca me siento en el exilio. (To Mahala, Javier & Pepe, because with them, I never feel alone.)

=== Mayo ===
- En memoria de un Mayo, revolucionario de corazón. (In memory of May, revolutionary at heart.)

=== Bajo el signo de Caín ===
- A mis hermanos Nacho el Delfín, y Nacho el de las Alas Mediterráneas. A mi Padre, el Maestro. (To my brothers Nacho the Dolphin, and Nacho of the Mediterranean wings. And to my father, the Maestro.)

=== Wako-Shaman ===
- A Bimba, Olfo, Nicolás & Jara... Que aprendáis a cuidar de esta tierra que es vuestra única casa. (To Bimba, Olfo, Nicolás & Jara... Learn to take care of this land, as it is your only home.)

=== Imagínate que te quiero ===
- A Lucía y Carlos por ser éste vuestro retrato cotidiano. (To Lucía and Carlos, for being this your daily picture.)

=== Sara ===
- A la Tata y a Nunu que saben mejor que nadie cuidar de todas las sarasituaciones...(To Tata and Nunu, who know better than anyone how to take care of Sara-situations...)

=== Sol forastero ===
- A Andrea...Te acuerdas? A Cecilia que me entiende. (To Andrea; do you remember? To Cecilia who understands me.)

=== La americana ===
- A Chacho y a todos mis compañeros de infancia... (To Chacho and all my childhood friends...)

=== Gota a gota ===
- A los mercenarios de rumores y calumnias, raza despreciable que ya rebosó el vaso. Quien se pique ajos coma... (To the mercenaries of rumors and catastrophes; the despicable race that makes my glass overflow.[i.e. the last straw] Those who mash garlic....eat them...)

== Personnel ==
- Miguel Bosé: vocals
- Sol Pilas, Andrea Bronston, Juan Canovas, Jose MaGuzman, Maisa Hens, Wuebo, Edith Salazar: backing vocals
- Ross Cullum: guitars, keyboards, piano, bass, drums, percussion, soprano saxophone, trumpet
- Sandy McLelland: acoustic guitars, keyboards, Hammond organ, drums, percussion, backing vocals
- Andy Ross: guitars, bass, keyboards, drums, percussion
- Vicente Amigo: Spanish guitar
- Bryn Haworth: slide guitar
- Naresh Ali Khan: violin
- Antonio Carmona: Flamenco accordion
- Javier Catala: electric guitars
- Gino Pavone: percussion

== Production ==
- Producers - Ross Cullum and Sandy McLelland
- Production Assistant – Andy Ross
- Recording and mixing - Ross Cullum, Sandy McLelland and Avril Mackintosh
- Editing - Dick Beetham
- Mastering - Kevin Metcalfe

== Certifications and sales ==
Sales and certifications for Bajo el signo de Caín
Region	Certification	Certified units/sales
Mexico	—	400,000
Spain (PROMUSICAE)	2× Platinum	230,000
United States	—	70,000
Summaries
Worldwide	—	1,000,000
