= Papito (album) =

Studio album by Miguel Bosé
- Released: 20 March 2007
- Genre: Pop, new wave, rock, dance-pop
- Label: Warner Music
- Producer: Miguel Bosé, Andrés Levin, Carlos Jean, Sandy McLelland, Nicolas Sorín

Miguel Bosé chronology
Velvetina (2005)	Papito (2007)	Papitour (2007)

Professional ratings
Review scores
Source	Rating
AllMusic	4.5/5 stars

Papito (lit. "Daddy") is an album released by Spanish pop singer Miguel Bosé to celebrate his 30 years in the Music industry. The album includes 14 tracks of previously known hit songs by the artist, in reworked versions in collaboration with many artists including Juanes, Shakira, Amaia Montero, Ricky Martin, Laura Pausini, Paulina Rubio, Alaska, Julieta Venegas, Michael Stipe, Bimba Bosé, David Summers, Ivete Sangalo and Italian singer Mina.

== Recording ==
According to the album booklet, this is the biggest music project ever completed in Spain. To make this album, the recording sessions lasted 10 months, Mr. Bosé had to travel 80,000 km by plane whilst his crew traveled even more: 130,000 km. They used 80 plane tickets, 152 hotel rooms and 38 rental cars, 15,000 phone calls were made and 10,000 e-mails were sent to make this project.

2,977 digital tracks were recorded during 2,234 hours in 19 different studios in eight cities, seven producers were involved, 14 sound engineers, 25 assistants and 87 musicians.

== Packaging ==
There are two versions of Papito: the standard edition with 15 tracks, and the special edition with another CD containing 15 previously recorded duets with same number of artists.

== Awards ==
On August 29, 2007, this album received four Latin Grammy nominations for Album of the Year, Record of the Year for "Nena" (his collaboration with Paulina Rubio), Best Pop Vocal Album, Male and Carlos Jean got a nod for his work producing this album, winning none.

Also, on December 6, 2007, Papito was nominated in the Best Latin Pop Album field at the 50th Annual Grammy Awards.

This album also won the Oye award in Mexico for Album of the Year .

== Track listing ==
Disc one

1. “Morena Mía” featuring Julieta Venegas
2. “Si Tú No Vuelves” featuring Shakira
3. “Bambú” featuring Ricky Martin
4. "Nada particular" featuring Juanes
5. “Amante Bandido” featuring Alaska
6. “Sevilla” featuring Amaia Montero former member of La Oreja de Van Gogh
7. “Nena” featuring Paulina Rubio
8. “Te amaré” featuring Laura Pausini
9. “Los chicos no lloran” featuring David Summers
10. “Como un Lobo” featuring Bimba Bosé
11. “Olvídame tú” featuring Ivete Sangalo
12. “Este mundo va” featuring Leonor Watling 4:50
13. “No Encuentro Un Momento Pa' Olvidar” featuring Sasha Sokol
14. “Hay días” featuring Alejandro Sanz
15. “Lo que hay es lo que ves” featuring Michael Stipe

The special edition of Papito includes the songs from above and also:

Disc two

1. Si Puedo Volverte a Ver (featuring Benny Ibarra)
2. Encadenados (featuring Chavela Vargas)
3. Agua y Sal (featuring Mina)
4. El Sitio de mi Recreo (featuring Antonio Vega)
5. La Vida es Bella (featuring Noa)
6. El Verano más Triste (featuring Carlos Berlanga)
7. Mía (featuring Armando Manzanero)
8. Habana (featuring Alejandro Fernández)
9. Corazones (featuring Ana Torroja)
10. Hojas Secas (featuring Mikel Erentxun)
11. Manos Vacías (featuring Rafa Sánchez)
12. Cada día (featuring Hotel Persona)
13. Carla (featuring David Ascanio)
14. Donde Alcance el Sol (featuring Pedro Andrea)
15. Si Todos Fuesen Iguales a Tí (featuring Rosa León)

== Charts ==
=== Weekly charts ===
Chart (2007)	Peak position
Italian Albums (FIMI)	1
Mexican Albums (Top 100 Mexico)	1
Spanish Albums (Promusicae)	1
US Billboard 200	160
US Latin Pop Albums (Billboard)	2
US Top Latin Albums (Billboard)	6

== Sales and certifications ==
Region	Certification	Certified units/sales
Argentina (CAPIF)	Gold	20,000^{^}
Chile	—	38,524
Colombia	—	15,000
Italy (FIMI)	2× Platinum	200,000
Mexico (AMPROFON)	4× Platinum	400,000^{^}
Spain (Promusicae)	5× Platinum	400,000^{^}
United States (RIAA)	Platinum (Latin)	100,000^{^}
^{^} Shipments figures based on certification alone.

== Personnel ==
- Produced by: Miguel Bosé, Andrés Levin, Carlos Jean, Sandy McLelland and Nicolas Sorín
- Executive producer: José Luis de la Peña
- Additional production : Goodandevil ("Morena Mia", "Nada Particular", "Este Mundo Va", "Los Chicos No Lloran", and "Lo Que Hay es lo que Ves".
- Recorded at: PKO Studios (Madrid), La Cuadra (Madrid), Estudio Jean (Madrid) Estudio Jean Roche (Cádiz), The River (London), Fun Machine (NY), Stratosphere Sound (NY), Sony Music Studios (NY), Goodandevil (NY), Elias Arts (NY), The Sound Lab (NY), Sony Music Studios (NY), Carl Thiel Music (Austin, Texas), Gamson's Place (LA), El Coraje (Miami), The Hit Factory Criteria (Miami) and Dreams Factory Studios (Panama).
- Recorded by: Pepo Sherman, Sandy McLelland, Andres Levin, Carlos Alvarez, Bori Alarcon, Gustavo Celis, Jose Luis Crespo, Goodandevil, Geof Sanoff, Phil Mezzetti, Carl Thiel, Dan Dzula, Robert A. Moses, Carlos Hernández y Miguel Bustamante.
- Mixed at: PKO Studios by Andy Bradfeld
- Assisted by: Carlos Hernández and Melisa Nanni.
- Backing vocals: Helen de Quiroga (“Te Amaré”), Tommy Dena (“Los Chicos No Lloran”) and Bosé (all tracks).
- Design: Daviddelfin/GrandeGraphix
- Graphic design and illustrations: GrandeGraphix

== See also ==
- List of best-selling Latin albums
