= Pájaros en la cabeza =

Studio album by Amaral
- Released: 14 March 2005
- Recorded: Eden Studios, London
- Genre: Folk rock
- Language: Spanish
- Label: Virgin Records; EMI Music
- Producer: Cameron Jenkins; Amaral; Guillermo Quero

Amaral chronology
Estrella de mar (2002)	Pájaros en la cabeza (2005)	Gato negro dragón rojo (2008)

Professional ratings
Review scores
Source	Rating
AllMusic	2.5/5 stars

Pájaros en la cabeza (English: Featherbrain or literally, Birds in the head) is the fourth studio album by the Spanish folk rock group Amaral released in Spain during 2005, that same year the album received their second nomination for a Latin Grammy Award for Best Pop Album by a Duo or Group with Vocal, and it was the best selling domestic album of that year in Spain.

== Track listing ==
1. "El universo sobre mí" — #1 (SP) (#5 (MX) (The Universe Over Me)
2. "Días de verano" — #1 (SP) #24 (MX) (Summer Days)
3. "Revolución" — #5* (SP) (Revolution)
4. "Mi alma perdida" (My Lost Soul)
5. "Marta, Sebas, Guille y los demás" — #1 (SP) #20 (MX) (Marta, Sebas, Guille and the Others)
6. "Esta madrugada" (This Early Morning)
7. "Big Bang" (Big Bang)
8. "Enamorada" (In Love)
9. "Tarde para cambiar" (Late to Change)
10. "En el río" (In the River)
11. "Resurrección" — #1 (SP) (Resurrection)
12. "Confiar en alguien" (To Trust In Somebody)
13. "Salta" (Jump)
14. "No soy como tú" (I'm Not Like You) (ft. Enrique Morente)

Mexican bonus track

15. "Si Tú No Vuelves" — #1 (MEX), #3* (ARG), #31* (Ibero America) (If You Don't Come Back)

== Sales and certifications ==
Region	Certification	Certified units/sales
Argentina (CAPIF)	Gold	20,000^{^}
Spain (PROMUSICAE)	6× Platinum	600,000^{^}
^{^} Shipments figures based on certification alone.
