= Bimba Bosé =

Spanish model and singer (1975–2017)

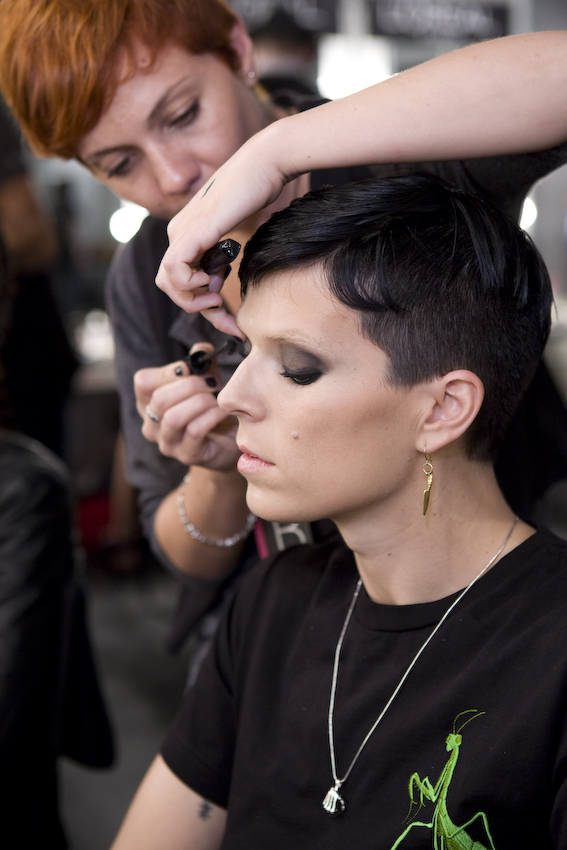
- Bosé in 2010
- Born: Eleonora Salvatore González; 1 October 1975; Rome, Italy
- Died: 23 January 2017 (aged 41); Madrid, Spain
- Occupations: Model; singer
- Spouse: Diego Postigo (m. 2006; div. 2013)
- Children: 2, including Dora
- Relatives: Miguel Bosé (uncle); Lucia Bosè (grandmother); Luis Miguel Dominguín (grandfather); Domingo Dominguín (great-grandfather)

Eleonora Salvatore González (1 October 1975 – 23 January 2017), known as Bimba Bosé, was a Spanish model and singer. Her artistic name, Bimba, means female child, (short for bambina) in Italian.

== Background ==
Bosé was born in Rome, the daughter of Spaniard Lucía González Bosé known as Lucía Dominguín and her Italian first husband, Alessandro Salvatore. She grew up with six siblings: one full sibling, brother Rodolfo "Olfo" (1980); three paternal younger half-siblings, Alessandro, Francesca and Alfonso and two maternal younger half-sisters, Jara and Lucía Tristancho. Her maternal grandfather was bullfighter Luis Miguel González Lucas "Dominguín", and there were other performing artists among her relatives, including her maternal grandmother, Italian actress Lucia Bosé. Her uncle was singer Miguel Bosé.

== Career ==
=== Modelling ===
Bosé was known for her androgynous look, described as "edgy" and "arresting". She worked with international photographers such as Steven Meisel and Mario Testino, and her image was on covers of fashion magazines Vogue and Harper's Bazaar. She was chosen as the face of Tom Ford's Gucci and Versus Versace. She was also a runway model in London, Paris, New York City and Milan for designers such as Miguel Adrover, John Galliano and Yohji Yamamoto.

=== Singing ===
In 2007, she recorded "Como un Lobo" with her uncle Miguel Bosé, and the song was included on his album Papito. The music video for the track is a performance of the couple at the 2007 Latin Grammy Awards. In 2008, she founded The Cabriolets group, singing in English and Spanish, and recorded three albums and one EP with them.

She recorded a version of Como yo te amo by Rocío Jurado mixed with the musical base of the original theme of the Twin Peaks television series, which became a popular hit. Her first CD, called Demo, was recorded in New York City by producer Andrés Levín, and musicians Marc Ribot and John Medeski collaborated on it.

== Personal life ==
She was married, from 3 June 2006 until the beginning of 2013, to producer and musician Diego Postigo Breedveld with whom she had two daughters, including Dora Postigo Salvatore.

== Illness and death ==
In 2014 Bosé was diagnosed with breast cancer and underwent a mastectomy. She continued to model.

In June 2016 she told the magazine Lecturas that the cancer had "metastasized in her bones, liver and brain" and she was continuing treatment.

Bosé died in Madrid on 23 January 2017, aged 41.

== Filmography ==
- El cónsul de Sodoma (2010), by Sigfrid Monleón.
- Run a way (2012), by Diego Postigo.
- La que se avecina (cameo) (2014)
- Julieta (cameo) (2016), by Pedro Almodóvar
- Levántate All Stars (competitor) (2016)

== Publications ==
- Y de repente, soy madre. Ed. Today's Themes (2013). ISBN 9788499982526
