= Gato negro dragón rojo =

Studio album by Amaral
- Released: 27 May 2008
- Recorded: Real World Studios, New York City; Close to the Edge Mastering London
- Genres: Rock; folk rock
- Length: 67:58
- Language: Spanish
- Labels: Virgin Records; EMI Music
- Producer: Cameron Jenkins

Amaral chronology
Pájaros en la cabeza (2005)	Gato negro dragón rojo (2008)	Hacia lo salvaje (2011)

Alternative cover
- Special "Librodisco" version

Gato negro dragón rojo (transl. Black cat-red dragon; also stylised as Gato negro◆dragón rojo) is the fifth studio album by the Spanish folk rock group Amaral. It was released in Spain in 2008. Recording and album mastering was completed on 25 April 2008. The album contains Juan Aguirre's first contribution as lead vocalist, on the track "Es sólo una canción".

== Release ==
The album was released in four different editions:

- standard 2-disc album
- 2-disc album with an extended 40-page booklet
- limited-edition box set with a 40-page booklet and additional extras
- USB memory stick with 19 songs, PDF booklet, and extras

== Track list ==
The first disc is named "Gato negro" and the second one "Dragón rojo".

=== Gato negro (CD1) ===
1. "Kamikaze"
2. "Tarde de domingo rara"
3. "La barrera del sonido"
4. "Las chicas de mi barrio"
5. "Esta noche"
6. "Las puertas del infierno"
7. "Biarritz"
8. "Gato negro"
9. "Rock & Roll"

=== Dragón rojo (CD2) ===
1. "Perdóname"
2. "Alerta"
3. "El blues de la generación perdida"
4. "De carne y hueso"
5. "Dragón rojo"
6. "Es sólo una canción"
7. "El artista del alambre"
8. "Deprisa"
9. "Doce palabras"
10. "Concorde"

==== iTunes edition ====
11. "El artista del alambre" (acoustic)

== Trivia ==
The song "El artista del alambre" was inspired by the film Fuera de Carta and was featured on the soundtrack to the film.

== Charts ==
Chart	Peak
Spanish Albums Chart	1
World Albums Chart	30
