= Una pequeña parte del mundo =

Studio album by Amaral
- Released: 2000
- Genre: Pop rock
- Length: 50:11
- Language: Spanish
- Label: Virgin Records; EMI Music
- Producer: Cameron Jenkins

Amaral chronology
Amaral (1998)	Una pequeña parte del mundo (2000)	Estrella de mar (2002)

Una pequeña parte del mundo is the second studio album by the Spanish folk rock group Amaral, released in 2000 in Spain.

== Track listing ==
All tracks composed by Amaral, except Nada de nada, composed by Evangelina Sobredo.

1. "Subamos al cielo" (Let's go up to heaven) – 3:18
2. "Cabecita loca" (Crazy little head) – 4:47
3. "Como hablar" (How to talk) – 4:01
4. "Los aviones no pueden volar" (The airplanes can't fly) – 4:13
5. "Queda el silencio" (Silence remains) – 4:00
6. "Una pequeña parte del mundo" (A small part of the world) – 3:27
7. "Botas de terciopelo" (Velvet boots) – 4:05
8. "Volverá la suerte" (Luck will come back) – 4:25
9. "El día de año nuevo" (New Year's Day) – 3:58
10. "El mundo al revés" (The world upside down) – 4:39
11. "Siento que te extraño" (I feel that I miss you) – 3:36
12. "Nada de nada" (Nothing at all) – 3:41
13. "El final" (The end) – 1:50

== Chart performance ==
In 2005, Una pequeña parte del mundo peaked at #43 in Spain.

== Certifications ==
Region	Certification	Certified units/sales
Spain (PROMUSICAE)	Gold	50,000^{^}
^{^} Shipments figures based on certification alone.
