= Cardio (album) =

Studio album by Miguel Bosé
- Released: 9 March 2010
- Genre: Pop
- Label: WEA Records
- Producer: Miguel Bosé; Nicolas Sorin

Miguel Bosé chronology
Papitour (2008)	Cardio (2010)	Papitwo (2012)

Cardio is the 18th studio album by the Spanish Grammy-winning musician and actor Miguel Bosé. It was released on 9 March 2010. Cardio spent seven weeks on the Billboard Latin Pop Albums chart, peaking at No. 3, and five weeks on the Latin Albums chart, peaking at No. 7.

== Track listing ==
1. "Estuve a punto de..."
2. "Júrame"
3. "Dame argumentos"
4. "Por ti"
5. "A mí me da igual"
6. "Cardio"
7. "El perro"
8. "¿Hay?"
9. "La verdad"
10. "Ayurvedico"
11. "Y poco más"
12. "Eso no"

== Certifications ==
Region	Certification	Certified units/sales
Mexico (AMPROFON)	Platinum+Gold	90,000^{^}
Spain (PROMUSICAE)	Platinum	60,000^{^}
^{^} Shipments figures based on certification alone.

== Personnel ==
- Produced by Miguel Bose, Nicolas Sorin
- Mixed by Andy Bradfield
