= Amaral (band) =

Spanish rock duo

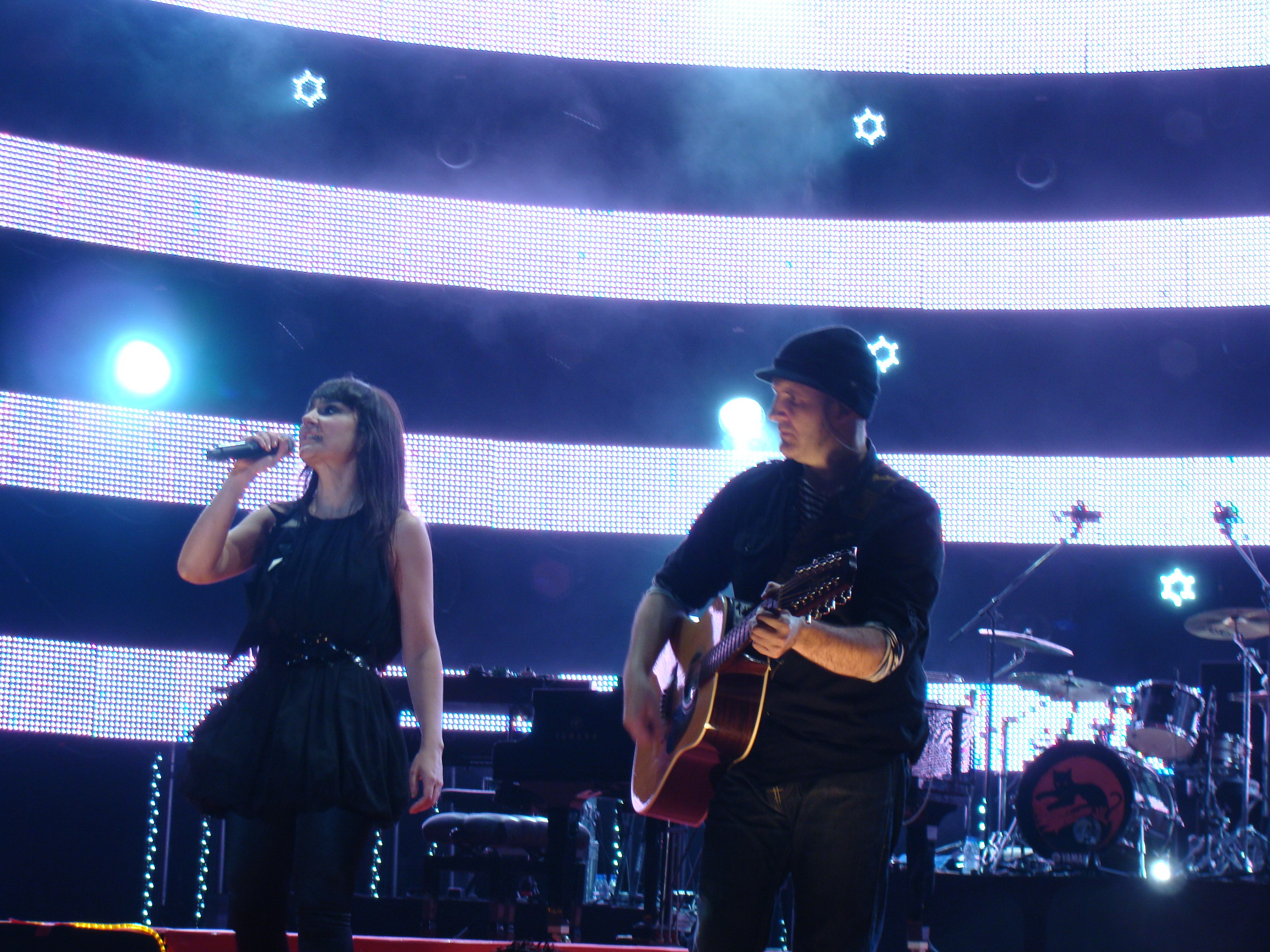
- Amaral performing in 2008

Background information
- Origin: Zaragoza, Spain
- Genres: Pop rock; folk rock; rock; Spanish rock
- Works: Amaral discography
- Years active: 1992–present
- Labels: EMI International; Virgin; Capitol; Gatorama; Antártida
- Members: Eva Amaral; Juan Aguirre
- Website: amaral.es

Amaral is a Spanish rock duo from Zaragoza, who have sold more than four million albums worldwide. The band consists of Eva Amaral (vocals) and Juan Aguirre (guitar), who write their songs together. The two met in 1992 in a bar in Zaragoza. Amaral played drums in a local punk rock band called Bandera Blanca and also sang with Acid Rain. Aguirre was playing with a band called Días de Vino y Rosas at the time. Soon after they met, the two decided to play together and perform their own material. In 1997, they moved to Madrid and signed a major deal with EMI. Amaral's musical style is categorized as pop rock, but it is often fused with Latin beats, folk rock, synthesizers, poetic lyrics, and in particular, traditional Spanish folk music.

Aguirre was born in San Sebastián, in the Gipuzkoa province of Spain. He spent his childhood in the town of Gros, while Amaral originates from Zaragoza. Inspirations for their songs include cinema, friends, and literature. The duo have won numerous prizes, including the MTV Europe Music Award for their 2002 album, Estrella de mar, which was nominated in five other categories. They are one of the best-selling Spanish groups of all time. As of 2025, they have released nine studio albums, one EP, two live albums, and three live DVDs.

== Collaborations ==
- Álvaro Urquijo, contributions on Amaral (1998)
- Beto Cuevas, on the song "Te Necesito", from Estrella de mar (2002)
- Chetes, on the song "Si Tú No Vuelves", from Pajaros en la Cabeza (2005)
- On Moby's 2006 single "Escapar (Slipping Away)"
- On Pereza's 2006 track "La Noria", from Los amigos de los animales
- On Ariel Rot's 2006 track "Sin saber qué decir", from Dúos, Tríos y Otras Perversiones (2007)
- Antonio Escobar, programming on Hacia lo salvaje (2011)

== Discography ==
Studio albums

- Amaral (1998)
- Una pequeña parte del mundo (2000)
- Estrella de mar (2002)
- Pájaros en la cabeza (2005)
- Gato negro◆Dragón rojo (double album) (2008)
- Hacia lo salvaje (2011)
- Nocturnal (2015)
- Salto al color (2019)
- Dolce Vita (2025)
