= Si Tú No Vuelves =

1993 single by Miguel Bosé

Single by Miguel Bosé

from the album Bajo el signo de Caín
- Language: Spanish
- English title: "If You Don't Come Back"
- Released: November 1992
- Recorded: 1992
- Genre: Latin pop
- Length: 4:42
- Label: WEA Latina
- Songwriters: Miguel Bosé; Lanfranco Ferrario; Massimo Grilli
- Producers: Ross Cullum; Sandy McLelland

Miguel Bosé singles chronology
"Madrid, Madrid" (1991)	"Si Tú No Vuelves" (1992)	"Nada Particular" (1993)

Music video
- "Si Tú No Vuelves" Video on YouTube

"Si Tú No Vuelves" (English: "If You Don't Come Back") was first released in 1993 as the lead single for Miguel Bosé's studio album Bajo el Signo de Caín.

== Background and release ==
The song was written by Bosé, Lanfranco Ferrario and Massimo Grilli. For the international edition of the album an Italian adaptation was recorded, Se Tu Non Torni, and an English lyrics one titled "They're only words" from the English language album Under the sign of Cain.

== Track listing ==
CD Promo
No.	Title	Length
1.	"Si Tú No Vuelves"	4:42
2.	"Lo Que Hay Es Lo Que Ves"	5:40
3.	"Bajo el signo de Caín (Instrumental)"	5:17

== Amaral and Chetes version ==
A cover version of the song was recorded by Spanish duo Amaral and Mexican singer Chetes and released on Amaral's 2005 album, Pájaros en la cabeza.

== Miguel Bosé and Shakira version ==
"Si Tú No Vuelves"

Single by Miguel Bosé and Shakira

from the album Papito
- Language: Spanish
- English title: "If You Don't Come Back"
- Released: 2007
- Recorded: 2007
- Genre: Latin pop
- Length: 5:13
- Label: WEA Latina; Carosello Records
- Songwriters: Miguel Bosé; Lanfranco Ferrario; Massimo Grilli
- Producers: Miguel Bosé; Carlos Jean

Miguel Bosé singles chronology
"Morena mía" (2007)	"Si Tú No Vuelves" (2007)	"Como un lobo" (2007)

Shakira singles chronology
"Beautiful Liar" (2007)	"Si Tú No Vuelves" (2007)	"Hay Amores" (2007)

The song is a re-make of Miguel Bosé's song featuring the Colombian artist Shakira and is included on the former's album Papito. "Si Tú No Vuelves" was first released in Italy and it was recorded by Gustavo Celis in Panama. The song was a success in Italy and Spain, reaching at 2 on the chart and certified gold in the latter.

The song is slow and melodic, and gradually reaches a climax where Shakira ends the song.

=== Chart ===
Chart (2007)	Peak position
Italy (FIMI)	2

=== Certifications ===
Region	Certification	Certified units/sales
Spain (Promusicae)	Gold	30,000^{‡}
^{‡} Sales+streaming figures based on certification alone.

== Miguel Bosé and Ha*Ash version ==
"Si Tú No Vuelves"

Single by Ha*Ash featuring Miguel Bosé

from the album Ha*Ash: En Vivo
- Released: December 6, 2019
- Recorded: 2018
- Length: 5:29

Ha*Ash singles chronology
"¿Qué Me Faltó?" (2019)	"Si Tú No Vuelves" (2019)	"Fuiste Mía" (2021)

Miguel Bosé singles chronology
"Gulliver" (2017)	"Si Tú No Vuelves" (2019)

Music video
- "Si Tú No Vuelves" on YouTube

The song is a re-make of Miguel Bosé's song featuring the American duo Ha*Ash and is included in Ha*Ash's live album Ha*Ash: En Vivo (2019). It was written by Bosé, Lanfranco Ferrario and Massimo Grilli.

=== Music video ===
The music video for "Si Tú No Vuelves", recorded live for the live album Ha*Ash: En Vivo, was released on December 6, 2019. The video was filmed in Auditorio Nacional, Mexico City.

=== Live performances ===
Miguel Bosé and Ha*Ash performed "Si Tú No Vuelves" for the first time at the "Festival de Viña del Mar" on February 20, 2018. On November 11, 2018, they appeared on Auditorio Nacional, and also performed "Si Tú No Vuelves".

=== Charts and commercial performance ===
The track peaked one on the Monitor Latino in Mexico.

==== Weekly charts ====
Chart (2019)	Peak position
Mexico (Monitor Latino)	1
Mexico Tocadas (Monitor Latino)	2

==== Year-end charts ====
2019 year-end chart performance for "Si Tú No Vuelves"
Chart (2019)	Position
Mexico (Monitor Latino)	86
Mexico Top 100 Touch (Monitor Latino)	90

=== Certifications ===
Region	Certification	Certified units/sales
Mexico (AMPROFON)	Gold	30,000^{‡}
^{‡} Sales+streaming figures based on certification alone.
