= Juan Aguirre (musician) =

Basque musician and songwriter

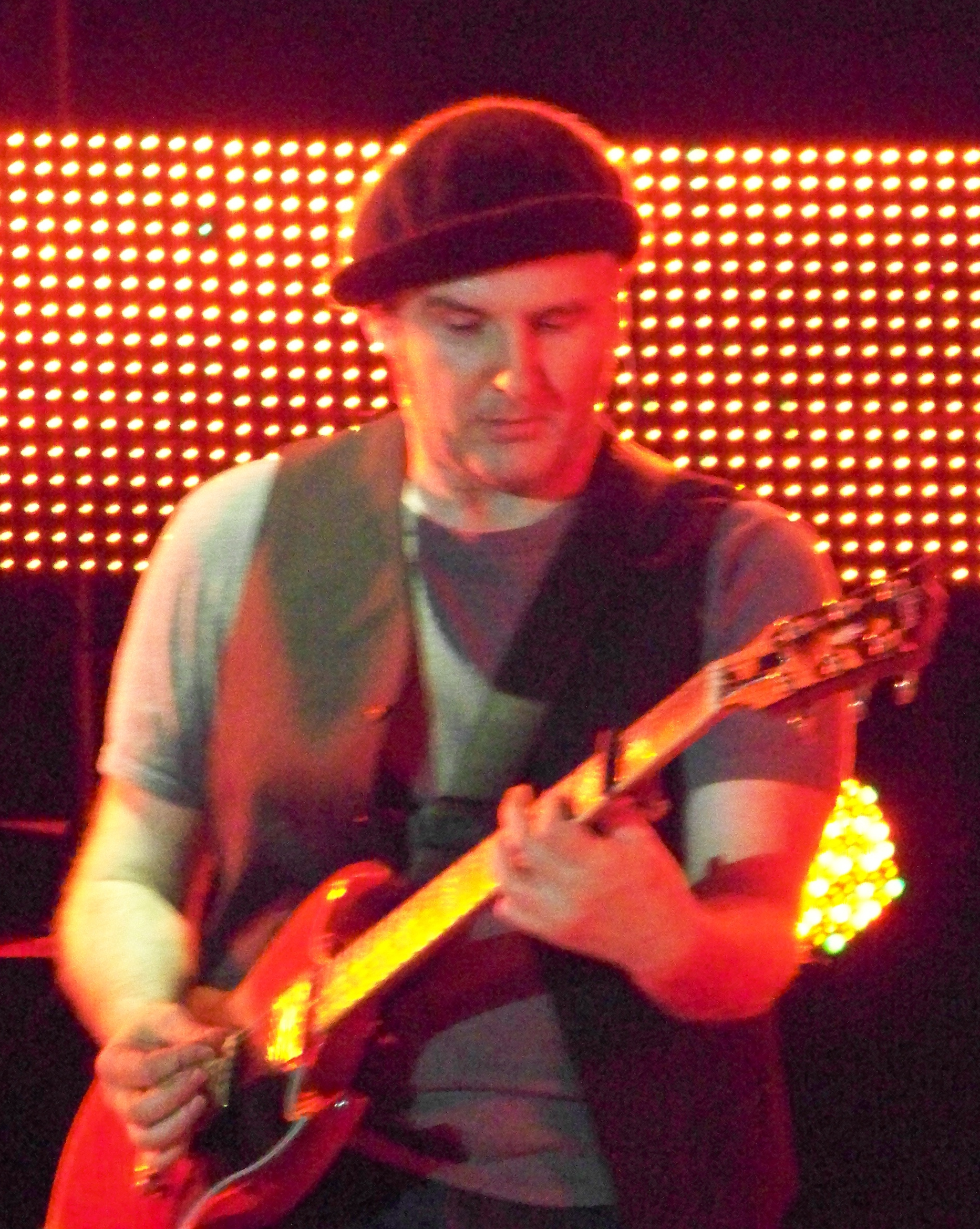

Background information
- Birth name: Juan Vicente García Aguirre
- Born: 11 February 1965 (age 60); San Sebastián, Basque Country, Spain
- Genres: Pop rock, folk rock, rock, Spanish rock
- Occupation(s): Guitarist, songwriter
- Instrument: Guitar
- Years active: 1990-present
- Labels: EMI International, Antártida
- Member of: Amaral
- Website: www.amaral.es/en

Juan Vicente García Aguirre (born 11 February 1965 in San Sebastián, Basque Country, Spain) is a Basque musician and songwriter. He is best known for being one-half of the Spanish group Amaral with its namesake Eva Amaral.

Aguirre was born in San Sebastián, living there during part of his childhood, then he moved to Zaragoza and founded a band named Días De Vino Y Rosas (Days Of Wine And Roses) there, that released an album in 1991. In 1993, he met Eva Amaral and they formed Amaral, which for the first few years of its existence, mainly played small shows in Zaragoza. In 1997, the duo relocated to Madrid and signed with Virgin-EMI, releasing their first album, the eponymous Amaral in 1998. Since then, Amaral have recorded a total of six studio albums.
