= Amaral (album) =

Studio album by Amaral
- Released: 1998
- Genre: Rock; Latin pop
- Length: 48:15
- Language: Spanish
- Label: Virgin Records; EMI Music
- Producer: Pancho Varona, Paco Bastante

Amaral chronology
Amaral (1998)	Una pequeña parte del mundo (2000)

Amaral is the first studio album by the Spanish folk rock group Amaral released in 1998 in Spain.

== Track listing ==
All tracks composed by Amaral.

1. "Rosita" (Little Rose) – 2:55
2. "Un día más" (One more day) - 4:21
3. "Voy a acabar contigo" (I'm gonna finish with you) - 3:52
4. "Cara a cara" (Face to face) - 3:23
5. "Tardes" (Afternoons) - 4:06
6. "No existen los milagros" (Miracles do not exist) - 3:41
7. "Lo quiero oír de tu boca" (I want to hear it from your mouth) - 3:35
8. "Habla" (Talk) - 3:17
9. "1997" (1997) - 3:36
10. "Dile a la rabia" (Tell the rage) - 4:30
11. "Soy lo que soy" (I am what I am) - 3:18
12. "No sé que hacer con mi vida" (I don't know what to do with my life) - 3:01
13. "Mercado negro" (Black market) - 4:46
