= Eva Amaral =

Spanish singer-songwriter

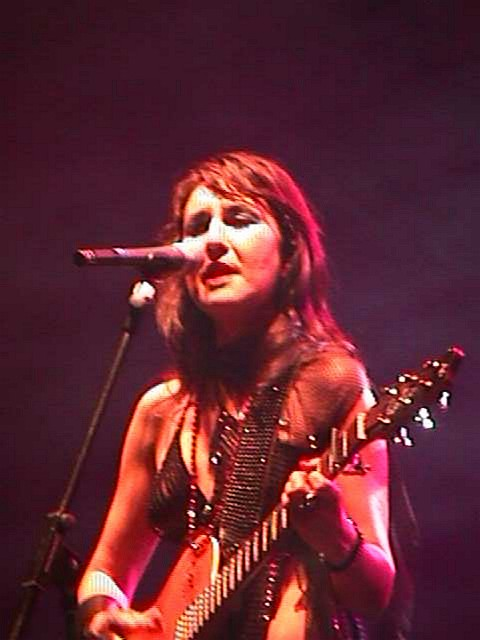

Background information
- Born: Eva María Amaral Lallana; 4 August 1972 (age 54); Zaragoza, Aragon, Spain
- Genres: Pop rock; folk rock; Spanish rock
- Occupation: Singer-songwriter
- Instruments: Vocals; harmonica; guitar; drums
- Years active: 1993–present
- Labels: EMI International; Antártida
- Member of: Amaral
- Website: Official website

Eva María Amaral Lallana (Zaragoza, Aragon, Spain 4 August 1972) is a Spanish singer-songwriter, and a member of the group Amaral with Juan Aguirre.

She studied sculpture at the Zaragoza art school, and while studying was the drummer in the band Bandera Blanca. In 1993, she met guitarist Juan Aguirre, a member of the band Días De Vino Y Rosas, and together, they formed the group Amaral. They moved to Madrid and later signed a contract with Virgin Records.

They have recorded successful studio albums and performed as support for Lenny Kravitz's Spanish concerts. Their song Rosa de la Paz was included in a record to support Prestige boat victims, also performing at the Nunca Máis demonstration in Madrid. Moby performed with Eva Amaral on the song "Escapar", the Spanish version of the Amaral song "Slipping Away". Beto Cuevas, front man with the Chilean band "La Ley" joined Amaral on their song "Te Necesito".

Pajaros En La Cabeza is their most well known album.

== Family ==
Her father, Isidoro Amaral, was born in Cáceres, Spain, and was the conductor of a music band, even though he did not like music. He died in 1998. Her mother, Carmen Lallana (1943–2007) died in Zaragoza in 2007. Her parents did not like that their daughter worked as a musician, but they accepted it and ended up loving it. She has an older sister, who "was the one that introduced me to the Beatles’ and Simon and Garfunkel’s music".

== Biography ==
Even though some people believe that she was born in 1973, she confirmed that she turned 40 in 2012. "I just turned 40 and I feel much more secure and stronger than 20 years ago".

She claims that she had a joyful childhood and that she never liked to play with dolls. Instead, she would play music with her cousin. She declares that she is shy and as a teenager, she felt like a weirdo and had many insecurities. At a young age, she taught herself to play drums. Initially, she thought she could not sing, but once she started she realised that singing was a more powerful way to communicate than drums.

She studied in Zaragoza at the school "Romareda". Afterwards, she studied volume techniques in the art school of Zaragoza. Meanwhile, she also worked as a bartender in "Azul Rock Café". She began to study lyrical singing when she realized that she wanted to become a singer. First, she took lessons in a civic center, but the teacher was fascinated by her voice and she sent her to her master. "Her lessons were very expensive and I did not have much money...". She was asked to audition and the master admitted her with a discount.

=== Working with Juan Aguirre ===
Eva and Juan met in 1992 at the back of a bar in Zaragoza. At that time, she played the drums in a local punk-rock band called "Bandera Blanca" and was also the leader single of another band called "Lluvia Ácida". From the beginning, there was love, friendship and music between the two of them. They went through all the bars performing. They were together for five years before it all started. After that, they began to do some sporadic trips to Madrid and then they started to stay there a little longer, sleeping at friends’ places, working in the catering industry and much more while they performed in "Libertad 8", "San Mateo 6", "El Rincón del Arte Nuevo" and "La Boca del Lobo". One day, Jesús Ordovás invited them to Radio 3 and sometime later, a guy from the Virgin company attended one of their concerts and decided to work with them. Then, someday in 1997, they made the decision of staying in Madrid.

== Musical career ==
=== Beginning and success ===
In 1998, Eva and Juan signed with the company Virgin-EMI and on 18 May, their first album was released. They called it "Amaral" and it was produced by Pancho Varona and Paco Bastante. The name of the band was Juan's idea, who took Eva's last name, even though she did not like it at first.

In 2000, after touring to present her first album, she recorded her second one in London. It was called "Una pequeña parte del mundo" (A small part of the world) and it contained 13 songs, 12 written by the band and a version of the song "Nada de nada" by Cecilia. This time, the album was produced by Cameron Jenkins, who also worked with The Rolling Stones, George Michael and Elvis Costello. Eva met him on the recording of an Enrique Bunbury's album, on which she collaborated. Cameron loved her extraordinary voice since the first time he heard it and he proposed the band to work with him. Jenkins produced all their albums until 2008.

In 2001, Eva Amaral was given the title of "honorary citizen" by the local government of Zaragoza.

The band recorded in London their third album, called "Estrella de mar" (Starfish). This was the best seller in Spain in 2002 and the most successful album of the band so far, having sold more than 2 million copies. The album appears as the number 24 on the list "The 50 best Spanish rock albums", made by the magazine Rolling Stone. They did a tour for two years where they gave more than 200 concerts and they played as supporting band in a concert of Lenny Kravitz. Furthermore, in 2003, Eva played the leading role in a short film by Andreu Castro called "Flores para Maika" (Flowers for Maika).

=== The hard time of "Pájaros en la cabeza" ===
In November 2004, Eva and Juan left for London, where they recorded their fourth album, called "Pájaros en la cabeza" (Head in the Clouds). The album was released on 14 May 2005 and they started the tour in June in Salamanca. Afterwards, they continued the tour in Mexico, Chile and Argentina. Amaral made a stop in Barcelona to record the concert and release it on DVD. It was called "El comienzo del big bang" (The beginning of the big bang). "Pájaros en la cabeza" was the most sold album in Spain in 2005, according to the SGAE (Spanish Society of Authors and Publishers).

Eva and Juan remember this period as a difficult time.

After ‘Pájaros en la cabeza’ we toured and it was a long and hard phase. It was all too much to handle. Suddenly, there was a lot of people around us who made us be worried about a lot more things than music, so we decided to detach ourselves from all that. We wanted to reflect on it and live a little. ... Eva has shown me that she is very brave and she stays true to herself, against the interests of the market.

The tour of "Pájaros en la cabeza" turned into a nightmare, so they decided to give fewer concerts on the following tour, and with a band formed by friends, not by professional musicians. Juan declares that they "needed to go back to their origins" and Eva adds that they "have lived a complete regression".

=== Fifth record and self-management ===
In the summer of 2007, while "Gato negro-Dragón rojo" was being recorded, Eva Amaral's mother died and the singer was not feeling strong enough to continue.

First, I thought that by locking myself in the studio I would get through it, but it was not that easy. But here we are, still standing on our feet, thanks to Juan, who really supported me. ... We thought about quitting. We did not do it, but we thought about it. [Juan also confirms that they almost quit:] It was a bad time and we thought that maybe this was not making us happy. We liked to make music but we did not like to be public figures. There are some things that happen to you that turn you into something like a puppet, like the one on the cover of “Pájaros en la cabeza”.

During these bad days, the producer Scott Litt had just replied to an email that Juan had sent him before. "We had sent him a song and he said that the voice sounded amazing and he wanted to see us. I was freaking out, I thought it was a joke", says Juan. Scott moved to Madrid, where he worked for a couple of weeks with the band. But Juan and Eva could not get over the personal downturn so they explained it to Scott and he understood it and stopped the project. "We thought that if you do something, you have to do it with all your heart and that was not our best time. We would rather lick our wounds on our own, we care more about ourselves than the band", continues Juan.

Finally, Eva and Juan started the year 2008 making a version of "A Hard Rain´s a-Gonna Fall" by Bob Dylan, the promotional song for the Expo Zaragoza 2008. The name of the version was Llegará la tormenta. On 27 May 2008 was released the fifth album of the duo from Zaragoza with the title "Gato negro-Dragón rojo", a double disc with 19 songs. The tour 2008 started in Zaragoza in December 2008. They were accompanied by a new band, formed by Coki Giménez (drums), Zulaima Boheto (cello), Octavio Vinck (acoustic guitar), Iván González (bass guitar) and Quique Mavilla (keyboard). On 2009, they had another tour that started in March in the Palau de la Música in Barcelona, a concert that was included on the Guitar Festival of the city. In July 2009, they participated in the concert of MTV Spain Murcia Night, celebrated in Cartagena by the wall of Carlos III and for more than 35.000 people.

On 22 September 2009, closing the "Gato negro-Dragón rojo" cycle, Amaral published a double CD+DVD/Blu-Ray named La barrera del sonido, which includes the concert recorded in the Palacio de los Deportes in Madrid in October 2008, closing like this a season to start a new band with the next studio album.

With "Gato negro-Dragón rojo" they started to self-manage their own songs.

... it´s an idea that came up in 2006 and we started doing in 2007. This year we´ve seen that it has caused interest. For us, it is a step forward" "it´s something that comes from long ago. We started the path of self-management with "Gato negro-Dragón rojo", but the idea that we had was already from many years ago. We had our ideal world where everyone can just manage themselves and keep everything more familiar. As I was saying, we started the last CD with our own brand but it was distributed by EMI but this year we´ve taken another step. The distribution is done by a small Spanish company and the truth is, we are very happy. We don´t have any kind of problem with EMI, in fact, we still have a good relationship with them.

=== National Award for Modern Music ===
On 27 October 2010, the Spanish Ministry of Culture gave Amaral the II National Award of Modern Music 2010 for their "contribution to the renovation of the current music panorama". The prize consisted of an amount of €30,000. The jury, headed by General Director of the National Institute of Scenic Arts and Music (INAEM), Félix Palomero, consisted of Dania Dévora, Rosa León, Diego Alfredo Manrique, Luis Mendo, Beatriz Pécker, Joan Manuel Serrat and Antonio Garde, the deputy director of Music and Dance of INAEM who acted as vice president.

Through an official statement, the band thanked the jury for the prize and dedicated it to all of their fans. Likewise, they recognize their evolution (from small gigs to big concerts) and see this prize as a starting point to follow in the search for the "perfect concert" and their "best CD". The money was donated to the Vicente Ferrer Foundation and it will be used to build 16 houses in the village of Madirebail, in Anantapur, and to guarantee the university studies of 4 students. The award was given on 12 July 2011 in La Seu Vella (Lérida), in front of the Princes of Asturias at the time, the Minister of Culture (Ángeles González-Sinde), the counselor of Culture (Ferrán Mascarel) and the mayor of the city (Ángel Ros). Jordi Folgado collected the award, as the director of the Vincente Ferrer Foundation.

=== Sixth record under a personal brand ===
"Hacia lo salvaje" is the name of the sixth album by the band, released on 27 September 2011, already under the new brand created for the band, called "Antártida" and also produced by herself, Juan Aguirre and Juan de Dios Martín. Eva explains the name of the brand saying that

Since we edited the CD with our own brand, it turned out that we didn´t have a name because we are a bit of a mess (laughs). We also didn´t care if it was our brand or Pepito Records'. We decided to name it "Antártida" because we were recording that song in the moment and it gave us the idea. We loved the image of the Antarctica, a completely imagined place as we've never been there. However, we loved the whiteness, something so pure and so real that it dazzles you. It also reminded us of that blank paper you have to face every time you start to write a song.

The presentation tour began in Zaragoza 6 October, where they performed five concerts in a row with all tickets sold out. "Hacia lo salvaje" was chosen as the third most important Spanish CD of 2011 by the Rolling Stone magazine.

In 2012, she collaborated with the Spanish heavy metal band Barón Rojo in the song "La Reina Ácida" from their new album "Tommy Barón". (The Spanish version of the song "Acid Queen" by The Who).

=== Celebrating 25 years ===
In 2023 she performed at Sonorama Ribera to mark the 25-year celebration of her musical career featuring "songs from her new album and legendary tunes from her career." She performed part of her set topless to show solidarity with other protesting musicians including Rocío Saiz, Bebe, Rigoberta Bandini and Zahara using their work in campaigning for women's rights.
