= Miguel Bosé =

Spanish and Italian singer (born 1956)

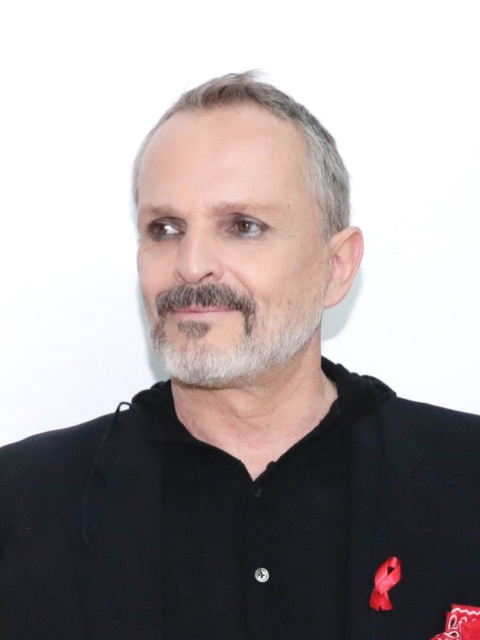
- Bosé in 2017
- Born: Luis Miguel Luchino Dominguín Bosé; 3 April 1956 (age 70); Panama City, Panama
- Citizenship: Spain; Italy
- Occupations: Singer; actor
- Years active: 1975–present
- Partner: Ignacio Palau (1992–2018)
- Children: 4
- Parents: Luis Miguel Dominguín (father); Lucia Bosè (mother)
- Relatives: Domingo Dominguín (grandfather); Bimba Bosé (niece); Dora Postigo (great-niece)
- Website: www.miguelbose.com

Luis Miguel Luchino Dominguín Bosé (born 3 April 1956), known professionally as Miguel Bosé, is a Spanish pop singer and actor.

== Early life ==
Bosé was born in San Fernando Hospital in Panama City, Panama, the son of Italian actress Lucia Bosè (1931–2020) and Spanish bullfighter Luis Miguel Dominguín. Bosé grew up surrounded by art and culture: Pablo Picasso and Ernest Hemingway were close friends of the family. The film director Luchino Visconti was his godfather while Pablo Picasso was the godfather to his sister Paola Dominguín.

== Career ==
Propelled by his famous family and their friends, Bosé started a career as an actor in 1973, taking part in various movies. He quickly found work on the basis of his talent and good looks rather than his family name. He studied acting as well as dancing and singing. Due to the lack of acting opportunities, he started exploring his talents as a singer in 1975. With the assistance of Camilo Sesto he recorded his first singles. Two years later, in 1977, Bosé signed a contract with CBS Records and he remained with them until 1984. With them he published his first album, Linda, which included his first hit single, titled in the same way. Between 1977 and 1982, Bosè was a major teen idol in Italy, Spain, Southern Europe and in all Latin America. He had 7 top ten hits that earned him a secure spot in every televised song festival held in the aforementioned countries. By 1983 his star had severely waned in Italy, and he rarely performed there again until the 90s, retreating to Latin American markets instead.

From 1983 to 1985, he participated in the "Llena Tu Cabeza De Rock" television specials on Puerto Rican WAPA-TV. In 1984 Miguel Bosé radically changed his style, focusing on a more adult audience. That year he published his album Bandido, which reflects that personal evolution towards maturity and includes songs like "Sevilla" or "Amante bandido". With this song, he topped the charts in Spain and Latin America. The video to that song also became one of the most widely seen Spanish music videos, with Bose playing both a Superman style superhero and an Indiana Jones type of adventurer. The album cover featured Bosé looking similar to David Bowie on his album Aladdin Sane. In Italy, where he had a parallel career singing in both Italian and English, his greatest success would be in 1994 by winning Festivalbar, the second largest musical event (after the Sanremo Music Festival), for the third time.

=== 2007: Papito ===
On 20 March 2007, to celebrate his 30 years as a singer, he released Papito, an album that contains remakes of his previous songs as duets with Juanes, Alejandro Sanz, Fangoria, Ivete Sangalo, Laura Pausini, Shakira, Julieta Venegas, Ricky Martin, Amaia Montero (past member of the Spanish band La Oreja de Van Gogh), Michael Stipe, along with many other singers. Three singles were released off Papito: the first is a re-make of his hit "Nena", featuring Mexican superstar Paulina Rubio; the second was "Morena Mía", with Mexican-American pop diva Julieta Venegas. The third single "Como un lobo" featured his niece Bimba Bosé. "Nena" was by far the most successful single off the album. It was nominated for a Latin Grammy for best song and became the best selling download of Spain in 2007. In the same year, Bosé was awarded the Billboard Latin Music Lifetime Achievement Award.

In 2008, Colombian President Álvaro Uribe offered him Colombian citizenship because of his efforts towards peace in Colombia, including his participation in two concerts in 2008. On 16 March 2010 he received Colombian citizenship during a ceremony in the presidential palace, Casa de Nariño.

=== 2012–2015: Papitwo ===
After several "hints" on Twitter, on 4 September 2012 he released the album Papitwo, a follow-up to his successful Papito. The album contained additional remakes of well-known songs from his career, again featuring artists such as Juanes on "Partisano", Bimba Bosé on "Shoot Me in the Back" and Alejandro Sanz on "Te Comería El Corazón". It also included new collaborations with singers such as Pablo Alborán on "Puede Que", Juan Luis Guerra on "Creo En Ti", Tiziano Ferro on "Amiga", Jovanotti on "Mirarte", Malú on his first hit "Linda" (first single in Spain), Joaquín Sabina on "Sol Forastero", Ximena Sariñana on "Aire Soy" (first single in the Americas) and Dani Martín on "Te Digo Amor", among others. The Hollywood actress Penélope Cruz collaborated on the unreleased song "Decirnos Adiós", composed by her brother for Bosé.

The album has two versions, a single disc with 14 previous hits remade with different artists and a deluxe one, with another CD containing 14 collaborations that Bosé made with singers during his career, including Hombres G on "Lo Noto", Raphael on "Morir de Amor", Natalia Lafourcade on "Si No Pueden Quererte", Spanknox on "Wrong in the Right Way", among others.

The album was released to coincide with Bosé's "Papitwo" Tour, which started in Madrid.

Miguel Bosé was honoured as the Latin Recording Academy Person of the Year on 20 November 2013.

=== 2016–present: Bosé MTV Unplugged ===
On 7 October 2016 he released Bosé MTV Unplugged, a live album that contains remakes of his previous songs as duets with Sasha Sokol, Pablo Alborán, Marco Antonio Solís, Fonseca, along with many other singers. Four singles were released off Bosé MTV Unplugged: the first "Bambú", featuring Fonseca; the second was "Gulliver", with Mexican singer Natalia Lafourcade. The third single "Olvídame tú" with Marco Antonio Solís. "Estaré", was released as the fourth single from the album on 7 February 2017.

On 20 February 2018 Miguel Bosé performed in the 2018 Viña del Mar International Song Festival, to a sold-out audience. Bosé performed "Si Tú No Vuelves" with American duo Ha*Ash. On 6 December 2019 Bosé featured on Ha*Ash's single "Si Tú No Vuelves" from the duo's Ha*Ash: En Vivo album.

== Personal life ==
In 1980, Bosé declared himself to be bisexual, "but not homosexual". Years later, he identified as "trisexual". He was in a long-term relationship with sculptor Ignacio Palau from 1992 to 2018. In 2011, Bosé's twins were born via surrogacy. Seven months later, the Bosé had twins who were born through the same method with Palau's biological gene.

On 23 January 2017, Bosé lost his niece Bimba Bosé to cancer.

During the COVID-19 pandemic Bosé became one of the most active denialists of the pandemic in Spain, questioning the effectiveness of masks and other aspects of the virus. Some of his videos were removed from YouTube and Facebook.

== Discography ==
=== Studio albums ===
- Linda (1977)
- Miguel Bosé (1978)
- Chicas! (1979)
- Miguel (1980)
- Más Allá (1981)
- Made in Spain (1983)
- Bandido (1984)
- Salamandra (1986)
- XXX (1987)
- Los Chicos No Lloran (1990)
- Bajo el Signo de Caín (1993)
- Laberinto (1995)
- 11 Maneras de Ponerse un Sombrero (1998)
- Sereno (2002)
- Por Vos Muero (2004)
- Velvetina (2005)
- Papito (2007)
- Cardio (2010)
- Papitwo (2012)
- Amo (2014)

=== Live albums ===
- Directo 90 (1991)
- Girados (with Ana Torroja) (2002)
- Papitour (2007)
- Cardio Tour (2011)
- Bosé MTV Unplugged (2016)

=== Compilation albums ===
- ¡Bravo, Muchachos! Los Grandes Éxitos de Miguel Bosé (1982)
- Lo Mejor de Bosé (1999)
- Colección Definitiva (2013)

== Filmography ==
=== Films ===
Film roles showing year released, role played and notes
Year	Title	Role	Notes
1973	The Heroes	German soldier	Cameo appearance
1974	Vera, un cuento cruel	Enrique	
1976	Prisoner of Passion	Humberto	
1976	Giovannino	Ignazio Leotta	
1976	Retrato de Familia	Cécil Rubes	
1976	Il garofano rosso	Alessio Mainardi	
1977	Suspiria	Mark	
1977	Oedipus Orca	Humberto	
1977	California	Willy Preston	
1978	Sentados al borde de la mañana, con los pies colgando	Miguel	
1981	Cosa de Locos	Unknown	Uncredited
1985	The Knight of the Dragon	Ix	
1987	En penumbra	Manniquí	
1990	The Miser	Valerio	
1991	Lo más natural	Andrés	
1991	High Heels	Judge Dominguéz	
1993	La nuit sacrée	The consul	
1993	Mazeppa	Gericault	
1994	La Reine Margot	Henry I, Duke of Guise	
1994	Enciende mi pasión	Ángel	
1995	French Twist	Diego	
1996	Amor digital	Cinco-cinco	Short film
1996	Libertarias	Durruti secretary	
1996	Oui	Hugo	
1998	The Naked Eye	Santhiago	
1999	Lorca	Lorca	Short film
2002	El forastero	Tourist	Cameo appearance
2021	Guerra de Likes	Himself	Cameo appearance

=== Television ===
Television roles showing year released, role played and notes
Year	Title	Role	Notes
1977	La gabbia	Carlo	Television film
1982–1983	Due di tutto	Himself/ Various	Sketch comedy/variety show
1988	The Secret of the Sahara	El Hallem	Miniseries
1988	Sanremo Music Festival 1988	Himself/host	Annual music festival
1989	Eurocops	Miguel	Episode: "Shanghai Lilly"
1995	Un sueño de cine. Homenaje a Ana Belén	Himself/host	Special
2002	Star Academy	Himself/host	Talent show (season 1)
2002	Sabor a ti	Himself	Episode: "May 28, 2002"
2009	The X Factor Italy	Himself/Guest judge	Talent show (season 2)
2010	Paulina and Friends	Himself	Special
2010	Ti lascio una canzone	Himself/Guest	Talent show (season 3)
2012, 2021	La Voz... Mexico	Himself/Coach	Talent show (seasons 2 and 10)
2013–2014	Amici di Maria De Filippi	Himself/Coach	Blue team (seasons 12–13)
2016	Bosé: MTV Unplugged	Himself	Special
2018	The Final Table	Himself/Guest judge	Episode: "Spain"
2019	Pequeños gigantes	Himself/Judge	Talent show (season 4)
2020	The House of Flowers	Vicar	Episode: "Laurel (símb. gloria)"

== Bibliography ==
- El hijo del Capitán Trueno. Planeta Publishing. 2021. ISBN 978-6070780691.
- Historia secreta de mis mejores canciones. Planeta Publishing. 2023. ISBN 978-6070794483.

== See also ==
- List of best-selling Latin music artists
