= Ednita Nazario discography =

The discography for the Puerto Rican singer Ednita Nazario

== Discography ==
=== Album charts ===
Albums	Year	Billboard Top 200 Albums	Billboard Top Latin Albums	Billboard Latin Pop Albums	RIAA Certification
Al Fin... Ednita	1973				
Me Está Gustando	1976				
Nueva Navidad	1976				
Vete Vete...	1977				
Mujer Sola	1978				
Retrato de Mujer	1979				
Ednita	1982				
Al Rojo Vivo	1983			5	
Tú Sin Mí	1986			5	
Fuerza de Gravedad	1989			4	
Lo Que Son las Cosas	1991			5	
Metamorfosis	1992			10	
Pasiones	1994				
Espíritu Libre	1996				
Corazón	1999		12	6	
Sin Límite	2001		9	6	
Acústico	2002	183	3	1	Gold (100,000), Platinum (200,000)
Acústico Vol. II	2002	136	2	2	
Por Ti	2003	116	1	1	Gold (100,000), Platinum (200,000)
Apasionada	2005	68	3	2	
Apasionada Live	2006	177	11	6	
Real	2007	101	1	1	
Real... En Vivo	2008	57	4	2	
Soy	2009	27	1	1	
Desnuda	2012	67	1	1	
El Corazón Decide	2013	44	—	—	
Una Vida	2017	—	—	—	

=== Singles ===
Year of release (US)	Song	Hot Latin Songs	Latin Pop Airplay	Latin Tropical/Salsa Airplay	Latin Tropical Airplay	Album
1986	"Tú Sin Mí"	9	—	—	—	Tú Sin Mí
1987	"Alma de Gitana"	19	—	—	—	Tú Sin Mí
1988	"Aprenderé"	2	—	—	-	Fuerza de Gravedad
1989	"De todos Modos"	32	-	—	—	Fuerza de Gravedad
1989	"Mi Corazón Tiene Mente Propia"	25	-	—	—	Fuerza de Gravedad
1991	"Después de Tanto"	13	-	—	—	Lo Que Son las Cosas
1991	"Eres Libre"	9	-	—	-	Lo Que Son las Cosas
1991	"Lo Que Son las Cosas"	2	-	—	-	Lo Que Son las Cosas
1992	"Más Que un Amigo"	13	-	—	-	Lo Que Son las Cosas
1992	"Tanto Nos Amamos"	14	-	-	-	Metamorfosis
1993	"Mírame"	6	-	-	-	Metamorfosis
1993	"Tres Deseos"	3	-	-	-	Metamorfosis
1993	"Y Te Vas"	32	-	—	-	Metamorfosis
1993	"Un Corazón Hecho Pedazos"	3	-	-	-	Metamorfosis
1994	"Pensando Siempre en Ti"	3	-	-	-	Live
1994	"Quiero Que Me Hagas el Amor	9	1	6	-	Pasiones
1994	"Te Sigo Esperando"	7	-	-	-	Pasiones
1995	"Como Antes"	8	3	9	-	Pasiones
1995	"Dime Tú"	30	8	-	-	Pasiones
1995	"Gata Sin Luna"	10	1	8	-	Pasiones
1995	"No Puedo Olvidarte"	22	3	-	-	Pasiones
1996	"Atada a tu Volcán"	9	1	7	—	Espíritu Libre
1996	"Lloviendo Flores"	12	1	—	-	Espíritu Libre
1997	"Desearía"	18	2	—	-	Espíritu Libre
1997	"Espíritu Libre"	26	5	—	-	Espíritu Libre
1997	"No te Pido Mas""	25	11	20	-	Espíritu Libre
1997	"Te Quiero"	-	8	-	—	Espíritu Libre
1998	"Siento Que Te Acabas de Ir"	31	15	—	—	Espíritu Libre
1999	"Más Grande que Grande"	4	2	6	-	Corazón
1999	"Pienso en Ti"	27	14	12	-	Corazón
1999	"¿Quién Te Robó el Corazón?"	11	4	6	—	Corazón
1999	"Tú Sabes Bien"	8	3	5	-	Corazón
2001	"Bajo Cero"	22	12	12	—	Sin Límite
2001	"Devuélveme"	13	9	4	—	Sin Límite
2001	"Dime"	38	22	13	-	Sin Límite
2002	"Tanto Que Te Di"	27	16	11	-	Acústico
2004	"Más Mala que Tú"	22	13	33	-	Por Ti
2004	"Si No Me Amas"	15	8	-	—	Por Ti
2004	"A Que No Te Vas"	25	18	—	—	Por Ti
2005	"Vengada"	18	11	—	—	Apasionada
2005	"A Que Me Pides Más"	—	26	—	—	Apasionada
2006	"Ni Héroes ni Vencidos"	-	-	22		Apasionada
2006	"No Quieren Parar"	-	-	30	—	Viva Navidad
2006	"Te He Querido, Te He Llorado” (featuring Ivy Queen)	-	-	23	—	Apasionada Live
2007	"No Te Mentía"	16	5	—	11	Real
2008	"Después de Ti"	46	17	—	—	Real
2008	"No" feat. Natalia Jimenez	—	22	—	—	Real
2008	"Alguien Más"	—	-	—	—	Real
2009	"Cuando No Te Queden Lágrimas"	—	-	—	—	Real
2009	"Sin Querer"	30	12	—	—	Soy
2010	"Confesados"	46	18	—	—	Soy
2010	"La Fuerza de un Te Quiero"	47	22	—	—	Soy
2012	"Para el Peor Amante"	22	7	—	—	Desnuda
2012	"Voy"	34	15	—	—	Desnuda
2012	"La Pasión Tiene Memoria"	35	6	—	—	Desnuda
2012	"Alérgica al Amor"	—	—	—	—	Desnuda
2013	"La Más Fuerte"	—	—	—	—	El Corazón Decide
2014	"A Mí No"	—	—	—	—	El Corazón Decide
2014	"Llorar por Ti"	—	—	—	—	El Corazón Decide
2014	"Así Es la Vida Sin Ti"	—	—	—	—	El Corazón Decide
2015	"Empezar a Vivir"	—	—	—	—	El Corazón Decide
2015	"Eras Uno Más"	—	—	—	—	Una Vida
2016	"Ya No Me Duele Tanto"	—	—	—	—	Una Vida
2017	"Ni una Lágrima (Bandolero)"	—	—	—	—	Una Vida
2017	"Adiós"	—	—	—	—	Una Vida
2017	"Almost Like Praying"	3	—	—	—	"Almost Like Praying"
