= Soy... El Concierto =

2010–2012 concert tour by Ednita Nazario

- Tour by Ednita Nazario
- Promotional poster for Ednita's tour
- Associated album: Soy
- Start date: May 7, 2010
- End date: February 14, 2012
- Legs: 1
- No. of shows: 14

Ednita Nazario concert chronology
- Soy... El Concierto (2010–2012); Desnuda El Concierto (2012–2013)

"Soy... El Concierto" is the concert tour by Puerto Rican singer-songwriter Ednita Nazario in support of her studio album Soy, presented by Raisinets and AT&T. Ednita bring her concert to different countries like Puerto Rico, Panama, Dominican Republic and United States. In an interview at Dominican Republic, Nazario said she will conclude this tour officially on February 14, 2012 at Hotel Jaragua.

== Opening acts ==
- Brenda Lau – (Panama)

== Setlist ==
1. "Soy Como Soy"
2. "Medley: Alguien Más / A Que No Te Vas"
3. "Medley: No Te Mentia / Tú Sin Mí"
4. "Me Voy"
5. "Sin Pausas"
6. "Déjame Ser"
7. "Medley: Por Ti / Devuélveme / El Dolor de Tu Presencia / Un Corazón Hecho Pedazos"
8. "Cuando No Te Queden Lágrimas"
9. "El Privilegio de Dar"
10. "Dos Eternidades"
11. "Toditas Mis Penas / Pégate"
12. "La Fuerza de Un Te Quiero"
13. "Medley: Por Ti Me Casaré / Agua Profunda"
14. "Intoxicándome"
15. "Confesados"
16. "Medley: Después de Ti / Eres Libre"
17. "Sobrevivo"
18. "Sin Querer"
19. "Sé Que Voy A Reír"
20. "Medley: A Que Me Pides Más / Vengada"
21. "Medley: Lo Que Son Las Cosas / Más Grande Que Grande / Aprenderé"
22. "Quiero Que Me Hagas El Amor"

== Tour dates ==
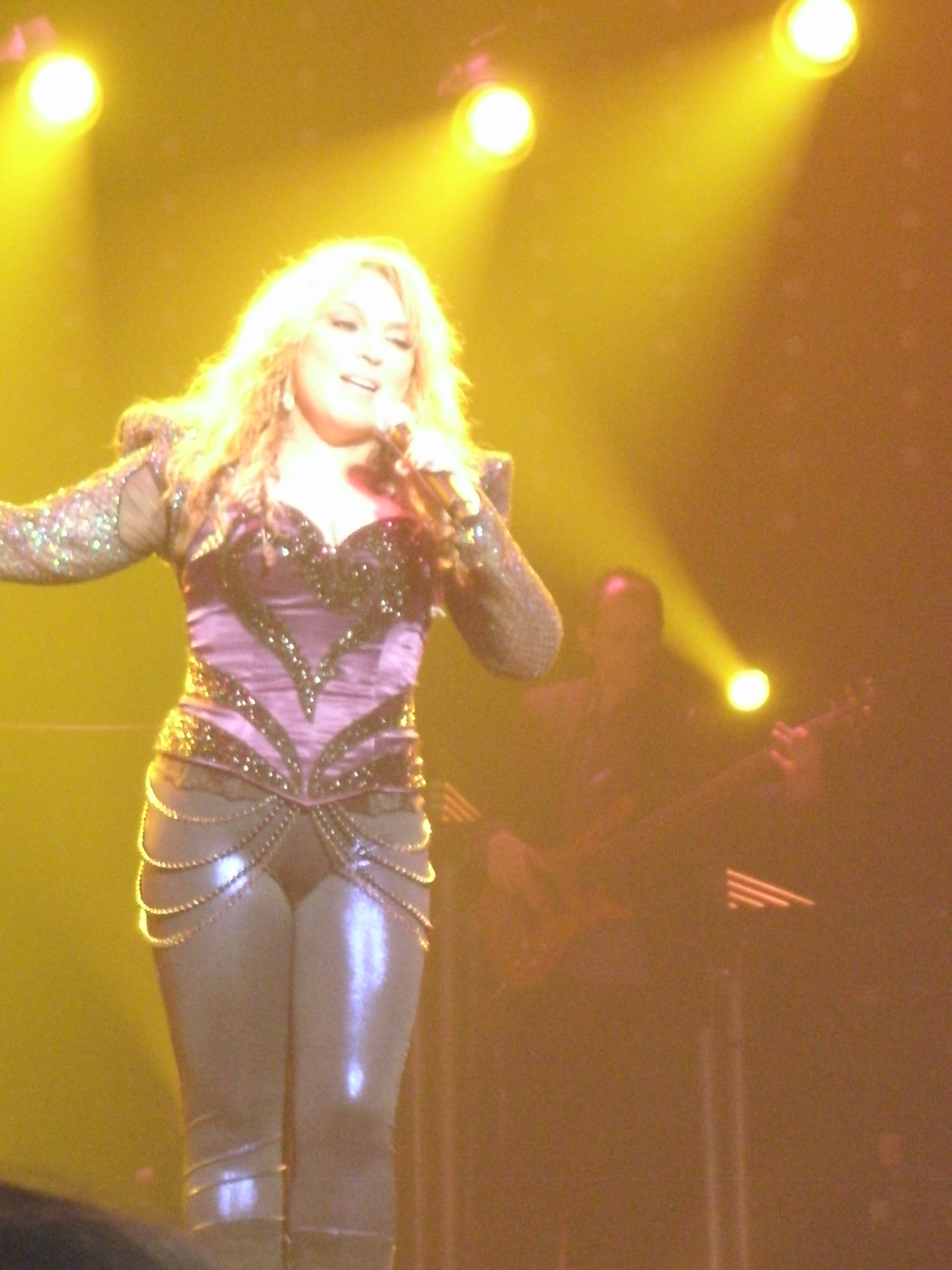
Ednita at her concert in Puerto Rico

Date	City	Country	Venue
North America
May 7, 2010	San Juan	Puerto Rico	José Miguel Agrelot Coliseum
May 8, 2010	San Juan	Puerto Rico	José Miguel Agrelot Coliseum
May 9, 2010	San Juan	Puerto Rico	José Miguel Agrelot Coliseum
August 28, 2010	Orlando	United States	UCF Arena
October 7, 2010	Panama City	Panama	Teatro Anayansi
October 22, 2010^{[A]}	San Juan	Puerto Rico	José Miguel Agrelot Coliseum
February 4, 2011	Coamo	Puerto Rico	San Blas Marathon
April 2, 2011	Orlando	United States	SeaWorld Orlando
May 7, 2011	Cayey	Puerto Rico	Estadio Pedro Montañez
May 27, 2011	Santo Domingo	Dominican Republic	Teatro Cibao
May 28, 2011	Santo Domingo	Dominican Republic	Hotel Jaragua
January 15, 2012	Añasco	Puerto Rico	Plaza Pública de Añasco
February 1, 2012	Mayagüez	Puerto Rico	Palacio de Recreación y Deportes
February 14, 2012	Santo Domingo	Dominican Republic	Hotel Jaragua

Festivals and other miscellaneous performances
^{A} These concert is part of the "Noches de Estrellas Fidelity".

=== Box office score data ===
Venue	City	Tickets Sold / Available	Gross Revenue
Coliseo de Puerto Rico	San Juan	32,928 / 35,384 (93%)	$2,324,098
UCF Arena	Orlando	3,436 / 4,588 (93%)	$179,085
Coliseo de Puerto Rico	San Juan	4,682 / 8,657 (54%)	$241,880
TOTAL		41,046 / 48,629 (84%)	$2,745,063

== Personnel ==
Producer

- Angelo Medina - Puerto Rico

Tour Sponsors

- Raisinets - Puerto Rico
- AT&T - Puerto Rico
- El Nuevo Día - Puerto Rico
- KQ105 - Puerto Rico
- OneLink Communications - Puerto Rico
- Liberty Cable - Puerto Rico
- COPEP - Puerto Rico
- Vtra Produccions - Dominican Republic
- Skypro - Dominican Republic
