= Quiero Que Me Hagas el Amor =

Single by Ednita Nazario

from the album Pasiones
- Released: 1994
- Studio: Calabasas Y Music Grinder, Hollywood, CA
- Genre: Latin pop
- Length: 4:26
- Label: EMI Latin
- Songwriter: Luis Ángel Márquez
- Producers: Ednita Nazario, KC Porter

Ednita Nazario singles chronology
"Te Sigo Esperando" (1994)	"Quiero Que Me Hagas el Amor" (1994)	"Como Antes" (1995)

"Quiero Que Me Hagas el Amor" ("I Want You to Make Love to Me") is a song written by Luis Ángel Márquez and performed by Puerto Rican singer Ednita Nazario on her album Pasiones (1994). Ramiro Burr of the San Antonio Express-News called it "provocative". It became her first number-one song on the Billboard Latin Pop Airplay chart. A live version of the song was included on her album Acústico Vol. II (2002). The song has been covered by Ray López, Ricky and Diana, and Johnny Ray.

== Charts ==
Chart (1994)	Peak position
US Hot Latin Songs (Billboard)	9
US Latin Pop Airplay (Billboard)	1

== See also ==
- List of number-one Billboard Latin Pop Airplay songs of 1994
