= List of Billboard Latin Pop Airplay number ones of 1994 and 1995 =

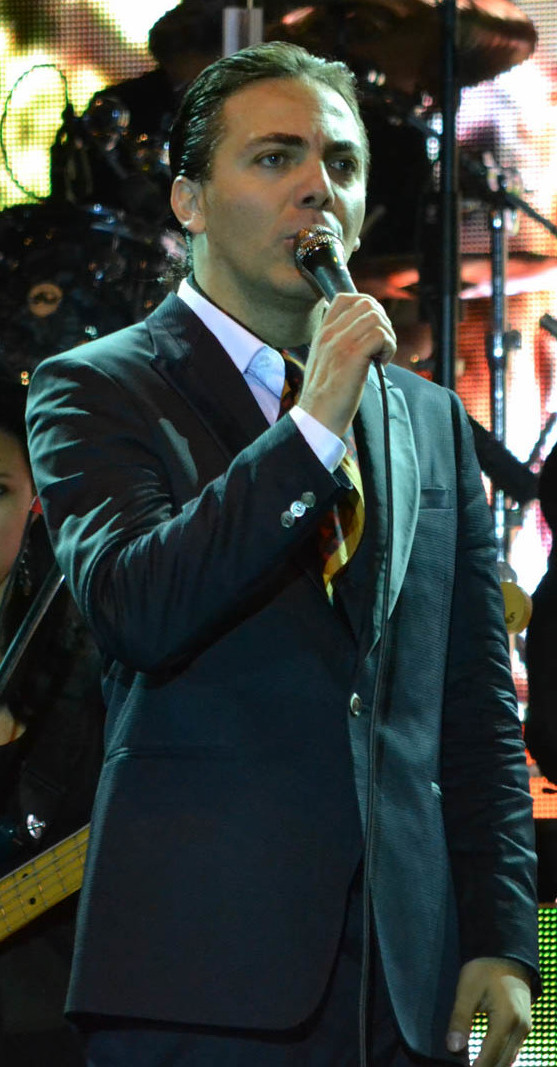
Cristian Castro was the first artist to reach number one on the Latin Pop Airplay chart in 1994. He also had the most number one singles in 1995 with three songs.

In October 1994, Billboard magazine established Latin Pop Airplay, a chart that ranks the top-performing songs played on Latin pop radio stations in the United States based on weekly airplay data compiled by Nielsen's Broadcast Data Systems (BDS). It is a subchart of Hot Latin Songs, which lists the best-performing Spanish-language songs in the country. According to Billboard, "Latin pop" refers to pop music sung in Spanish. Five songs topped the chart in 1994 while 16 tracks did the same in 1995. Until November 5, 1994, BDS ran tests charts which only listed the number one song of the week on Billboard's electronic database.

The first song to reach number one on the Latin Pop Airplay chart was "Mañana" by Cristian Castro, which was composed and originally performed by Juan Gabriel. Castro was also the artist with the most number-one songs in 1995 with "Con Tu Amor", "Azul Gris", and "Vuélveme a Querer". The latter song held this position for the longest with 14 weeks. Luis Miguel had two number-one songs on the chart in 1994 with "El Día Que Me Quieras" and "La Media Vuelta", the second of which was the final chart-topper of the year and the first at the start of 1995. He achieved his third number one track in 1995 with "Todo y Nada". The three songs were recorded for the album Segundo Romance (1994), in which Luis Miguel covers ballads from Latin America. Ednita Nazario became the first female artist to have a chart-topper with "Quiero Que Me Hagas el Amor" and achieved her second number one song a year later with "Gata Sin Luna".

Former Timbiriche band member, Claudio Bermúdez (credited for this release simply as Claudio), released his debut album Como Aire Fresco in 1994 which was promoted by its lead single "Ven Junto a Mi". "Ven Junto a Mi" spent seven consecutive weeks on top of the chart in 1995. Despite this level of chart success, the song remains Bermúdez's only number one recording. Selena's "I Could Fall in Love" posthumously became the first English-language song to song to peak at number one on the survey and remains her only number-one song on this chart. Similarly, Lucero and Julio Iglesias obtained their first and only chart-toppers in 1995. Laura Pausini was the only female act to have more than one chart-topper in 1995 with the Spanish-language versions of "Strani amori" ("Amores Extraños") and "Gente". Although it spent only a single week at number one in 1995, "Ese Hombre" by Myriam Hernández was named as the best-performing Latin pop song of the year. The final number one of 1995 was "Más Allá" by Gloria Estefan.

== Chart history ==
Key
†	Indicates number 1 on Billboard's year-end Latin pop chart

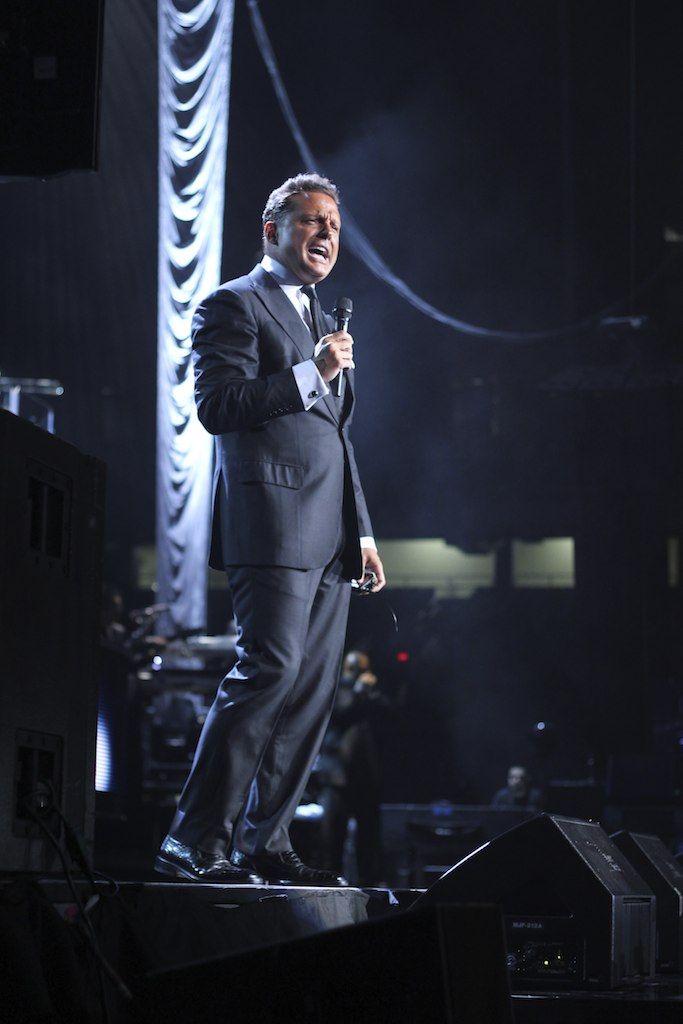
Luis Miguel had three number songs in 1994 and 1995.

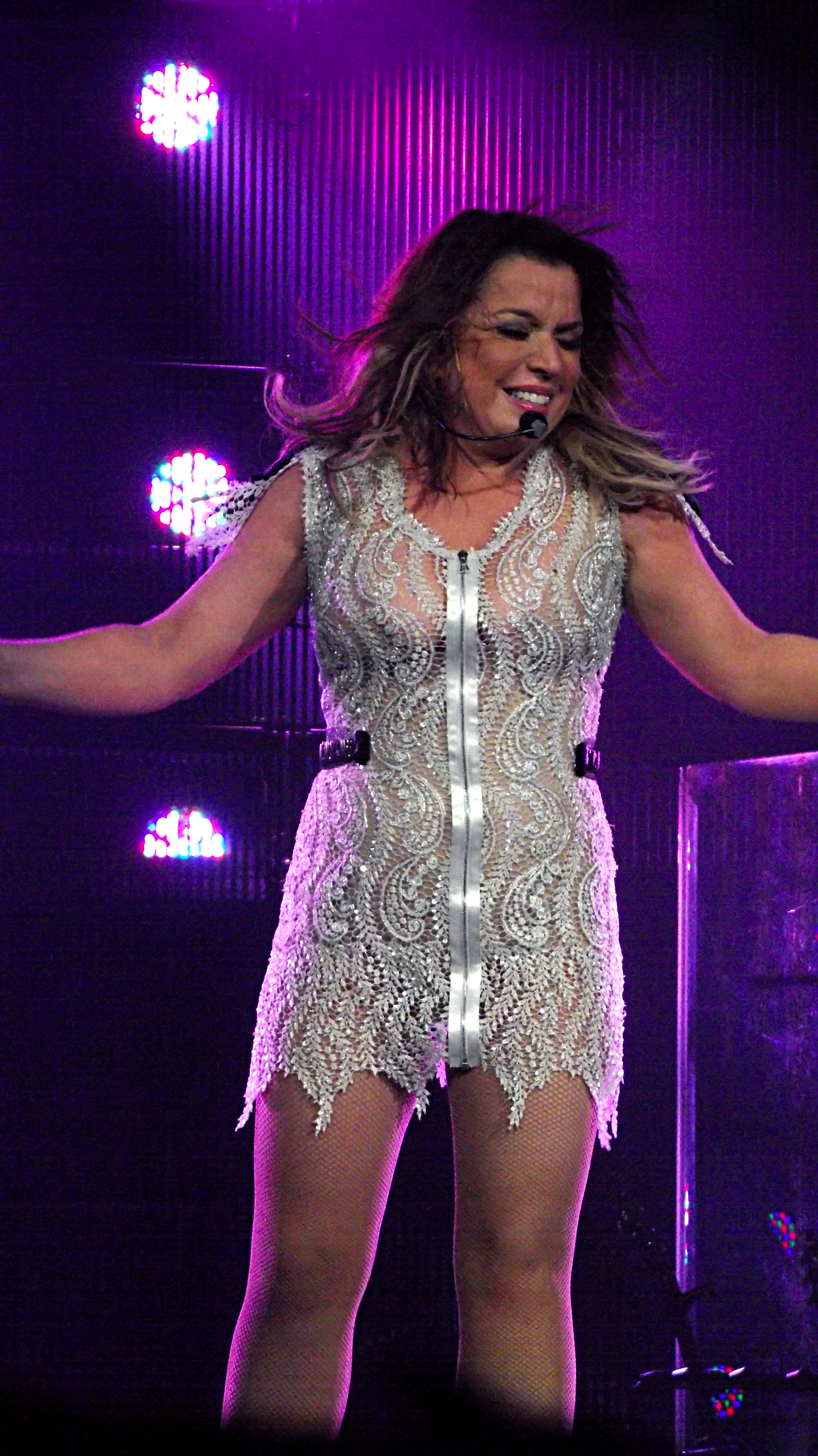
Ednita Nazario was the first female artist to reach number one on the Latin Pop Airplay chart.

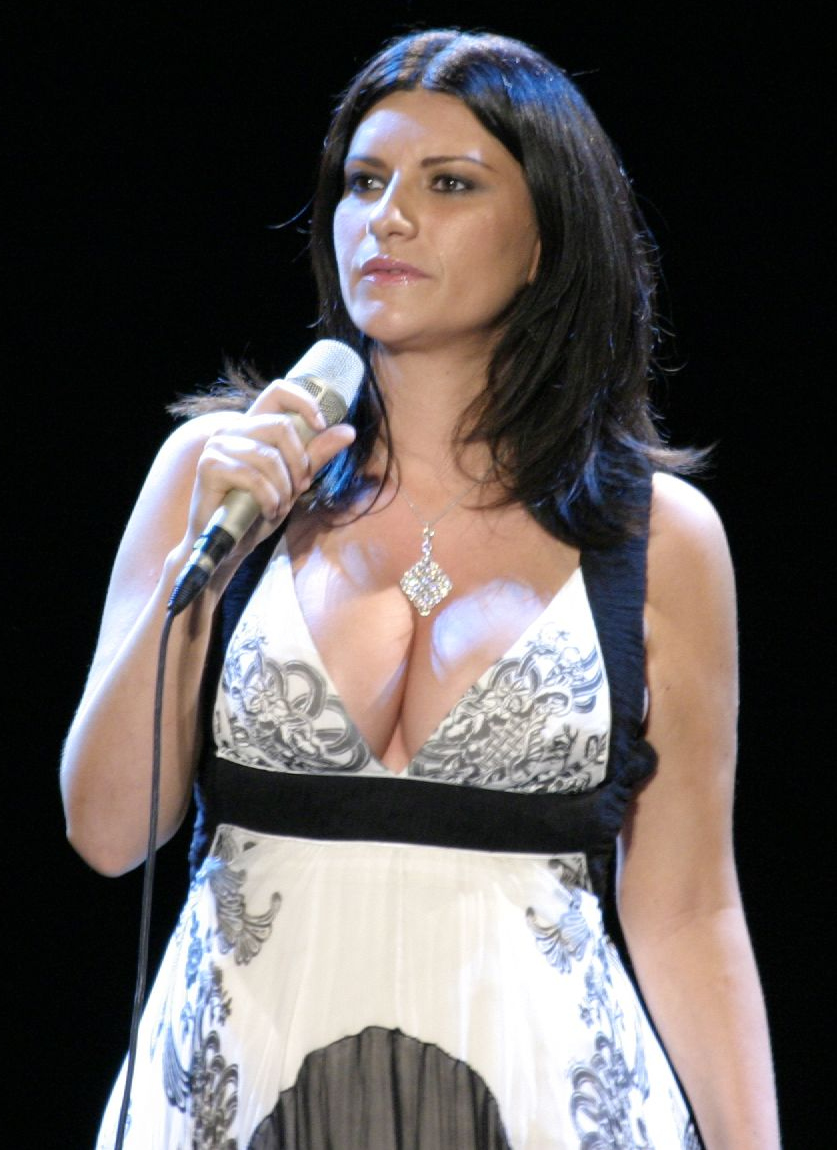
Laura Pausini was the only female artist to have more than one song reach number one in 1995.

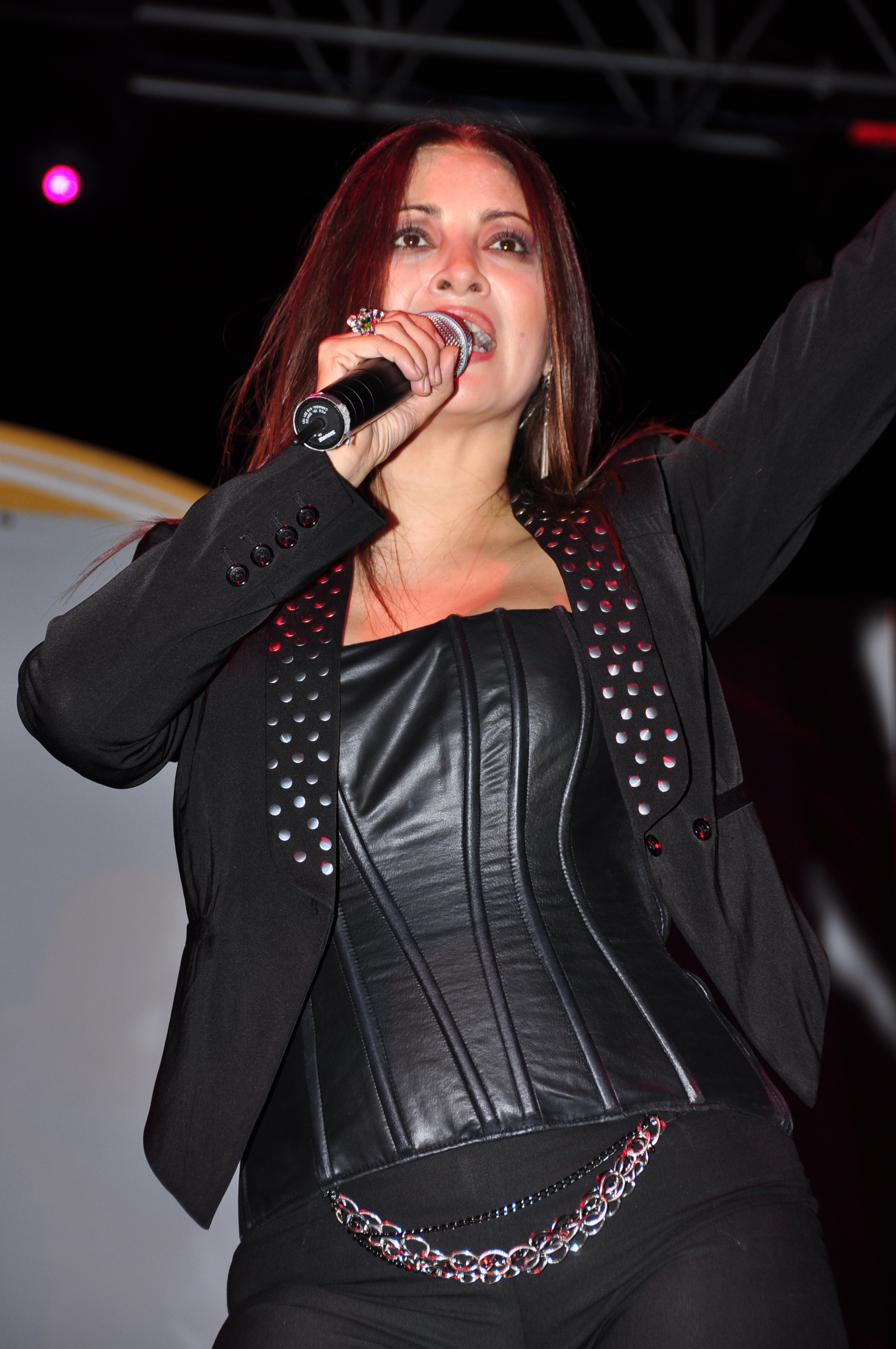
"Ese Hombre" by Myriam Hernández was named the best-performing Latin pop song of 1995 by Billboard.

Chart history
Issue date	Title	Artist(s)	Ref.
October 8, 1994	"Mañana"	Cristian Castro	
October 15, 1994	"El Día Que Me Quieras"	Luis Miguel	
October 22, 1994	"El Día Que Me Quieras"	Luis Miguel	
October 29, 1994	"El Día Que Me Quieras"	Luis Miguel	
November 5, 1994	"Viviré"	Juan Luis Guerra & 4.40	
November 12, 1994	"Quiero Que Me Hagas el Amor"	Ednita Nazario	
November 19, 1994	"Quiero Que Me Hagas el Amor"	Ednita Nazario	
November 26, 1994	"La Media Vuelta"	Luis Miguel	
December 3, 1994	"La Media Vuelta"	Luis Miguel	
December 10, 1994	"Quiero Que Me Hagas el Amor"	Ednita Nazario	
December 19, 1994	"Quiero Que Me Hagas el Amor"	Ednita Nazario	
December 24, 1994	"La Media Vuelta"	Luis Miguel	
December 31, 1994	"La Media Vuelta"	Luis Miguel	
January 7, 1995	"La Media Vuelta"	Luis Miguel	
January 14, 1995	"Siempre Contigo"	Lucero	
January 21, 1995	"Con Tu Amor"	Cristian Castro	
January 28, 1995	"Con Tu Amor"	Cristian Castro	
February 4, 1995	"Con Tu Amor"	Cristian Castro	
February 11, 1995	"Con Tu Amor"	Cristian Castro	
February 18, 1995	"Todo y Nada"	Luis Miguel	
February 25, 1995	"Todo y Nada"	Luis Miguel	
March 4, 1995	"Todo y Nada"	Luis Miguel	
March 11, 1995	"Todo y Nada"	Luis Miguel	
March 18, 1995	"Todo y Nada"	Luis Miguel	
March 25, 1995	"Todo y Nada"	Luis Miguel	
April 1, 1995	"Ese Hombre" †	Myriam Hernández	
April 8, 1995	"Amores Extraños"	Laura Pausini	
April 15, 1995	"Amores Extraños"	Laura Pausini	
April 22, 1995	"Amores Extraños"	Laura Pausini	
April 29, 1995	"Azul Gris"	Cristian Castro	
May 6, 1995	"Ven Junto a Mi"	Claudio (Note: Claudio Bermúdez was credited simply as Claudio on this release.)	
May 13, 1995	"Ven Junto a Mi"	Claudio	
May 20, 1995	"Ven Junto a Mi"	Claudio	
May 27, 1995	"Ven Junto a Mi"	Claudio	
June 3, 1995	"Ven Junto a Mi"	Claudio	
June 10, 1995	"Ven Junto a Mi"	Claudio	
June 17, 1995	"Ven Junto a Mi"	Claudio	
June 24, 1995	"Gente"	Laura Pausini	
July 1, 1995	"Gente"	Laura Pausini	
July 8, 1995	"Gente"	Laura Pausini	
July 15, 1995	"Gente"	Laura Pausini	
July 22, 1995	"Gata Sin Luna"	Ednita Nazario	
July 29, 1995	"No Ha Parado de Llover"	Maná	
August 5, 1995	"No Ha Parado de Llover"	Maná	
August 12, 1995	"Gata Sin Luna"	Ednita Nazario	
August 19, 1995	"I Could Fall in Love"	Selena	
August 26, 1995	"Agua Dulce, Agua Salá"	Julio Iglesias	
September 2, 1995	"Gata Sin Luna"	Ednita Nazario	
September 9, 1995	"La Tierra del Olvido"	Carlos Vives	
September 16, 1995	"La Tierra del Olvido"	Carlos Vives	
September 23, 1995	"Vuélveme a Querer"	Cristian Castro	
September 30, 1995	"Vuélveme a Querer"	Cristian Castro	
October 7, 1995	"Vuélveme a Querer"	Cristian Castro	
October 14, 1995	"Vuélveme a Querer"	Cristian Castro	
October 21, 1995	"Vuélveme a Querer"	Cristian Castro	
October 28, 1995	"Vuélveme a Querer"	Cristian Castro	
November 4, 1995	"Vuélveme a Querer"	Cristian Castro	
November 11, 1995	"Vuélveme a Querer"	Cristian Castro	
November 18, 1995	"Vuélveme a Querer"	Cristian Castro	
November 25, 1995	"Vuélveme a Querer"	Cristian Castro	
December 2, 1995	"Vuélveme a Querer"	Cristian Castro	
December 9, 1995	"Vuélveme a Querer"	Cristian Castro	
December 16, 1995	"Vuélveme a Querer"	Cristian Castro	
December 23, 1995	"Vuélveme a Querer"	Cristian Castro	
December 30, 1995	"Más Allá"	Gloria Estefan	

== See also ==
- 1994 in Latin music
- 1995 in Latin music
