= Gata Sin Luna =

1995 single by Ednita Nazario

Single by Ednita Nazario

from the album Pasiones
- Released: 1995
- Studio: Calabasas Y Music Grinder, Hollywood, CA
- Genre: Latin pop
- Length: 4:27
- Label: EMI Latin
- Songwriter: Luis Ángel Márquez
- Producers: Ednita Nazario, KC Porter

Ednita Nazario singles chronology
"No Puedo Olvidarte" (1995)	"Gata Sin Luna" (1995)	"Dime Tu" (1995)

"Gata Sin Luna" ("Moonless Cat") is a song written by Luis Ángel Márquez and performed by Puerto Rican singer Ednita Nazario on her album Pasiones (1994). It became her second number-one song on the Billboard Latin Pop Airplay chart in 1995. The song earned Nazario an ACE for "Most Outstanding Song by a Female Artist". The song has been covered by Saned Rivera Corrine, and Sonora Tropicana.

== Charts ==
=== Weekly charts ===
Chart (1995)	Peak position
US Hot Latin Songs (Billboard)	7
US Latin Pop Airplay (Billboard)	1

=== Year-end charts ===
Chart (1995)	Peak position
US Latin Pop Airplay (Billboard)	7

== See also ==
- List of number-one Billboard Latin Pop Airplay songs of 1995
