= Atada a Tu Volcán =

1996 single by Ednita Nazario

Single by Ednita Nazario

from the album Espíritu Libre
- Released: 1996
- Studio: Conway Recording, Hollywood, CA; Ocean Way, Hollywood, CA; Pacifique Studios, North Hollywood, CA; Worldbeat Recording, Calabasas, CA
- Genre: Latin pop
- Length: 4:30
- Label: EMI Latin
- Songwriter: Frank Ceara
- Producers: Ednita Nazario, KC Porter

Ednita Nazario singles chronology
"Dime Tu" (1995)	"Atada a Tu Volcán" (1996)	"Lloviendo Flores" (1996)

"Atada a Tu Volcán" ("Tied to Your Volcano") is a song written by Frank Ceaera and performed by Puerto Rican singer Ednita Nazario on her album Espíritu Libre (1996). It became her third number-one song on the Billboard Latin Pop Airplay chart in 1996. Ceaera was awarded at the 1997 American Society of Composers, Authors and Publishers in the Pop/Rock category for the song. A music video was filmed for the song.

== Charts ==
=== Weekly charts ===
Chart (1996)	Peak position
US Hot Latin Songs (Billboard)	9
US Latin Pop Airplay (Billboard)	1

=== Year-end charts ===
Chart (1996)	Position
US Latin Pop Airplay (Billboard)	12

== See also ==
- List of number-one Billboard Latin Pop Airplay songs of 1996
