= Sin Límite (Ednita Nazario album) =

Studio album by Ednita Nazario
- Released: February 27, 2001
- Genres: Latin pop, rock, pop rock, Spanish rock, Puerto Rican rock
- Length: 48:00
- Label: Sony Discos
- Producers: Ednita Nazario; Tommy Torres; César Lemos; Juan V. Zambrano

Ednita Nazario chronology
Corazón (1999)	Sin Límite (2001)	Acústico (2002)

Sin Límite (Without Limit) is the seventeenth album and sixteenth studio album by Puerto Rican singer Ednita Nazario. It was released on February 27, 2001. Her first album signed to Sony Music, it was not commercially successful or an international success compared to her 2003 album Por Ti. Despite that, it was Nazario's first album to enter the top ten of the US Top Latin Albums chart.

Professional ratings
Review scores
Source	Rating
AllMusic	4.5/5 stars

== Charts ==
Chart (dats)	Peak position
US Latin Pop Albums (Billboard)	6
US Top Latin Albums (Billboard)	9
US Heatseekers Albums (Billboard)	47

== Track listing ==
No.	Title	Writer(s)	Length
1.	"Devuélveme"	Yoel Henríquez	3:22
2.	"Después de la Lluvia"	Claudia Brant	3:40
3.	"Bajo Cero"	Ednita Nazario	4:17
4.	"Vida"	Karla Aponte, Cesar Lemos	4:36
5.	"Dime"	Karla Aponte, Cesar Lemos	3:27
6.	"Lo Que Fue No Será"	Jodi Horovitz	3:40
7.	"No Te Quiero Más"	Luis Angel	4:12
8.	"Cada Vez"	Jodi Horovitz, Juan Carlos Perez-Soto	3:33
9.	"Porque Hablamos" (featuring Ricardo Arjona)	Ednita Nazario	4:41
10.	"Hielo Bajo el Sol"	Tommy Torres	4:12
11.	"Having the Time of My Life"	Karla Aponte, Cesar Lemos	4:36
12.	"Toditas Mis Penas"	Carlos Vives, Juan Vincente Zambrano	3:50
