= Desnuda (album) =

Studio album by Ednita Nazario
- Released: March 27, 2012
- Recorded: 2011–12
- Genres: Latin pop, rock, pop
- Length: 45:57
- Label: Sony Latin
- Producers: George Noriega, Sebastián Krys, Iker Gastaminza, Gary Burnette, Pedro Alfonso, Tommy Torres, Andres Saavedra

Ednita Nazario chronology
Soy (2009)	Desnuda (2012)	El Corazón Decide (2013)

Singles from Desnuda
- 1. "Para el Peor Amante" Released: January 30, 2012; 2. "Voy" Released: April 16, 2012; 3. "La Pasión Tiene Memoria" Released: July 17, 2012; 4. "Alérgica al Amor" Released: November 5, 2012

Desnuda (Naked) is the 26th album and 21st studio album recorded by Puerto Rican singer Ednita Nazario. It was released on March 27, 2012. The album follows the same musical and lyrical formula of her previous recordings with moderate success in terms of sales.

== Track listing ==
No.	Title	Composer	Length
1.	"Voy"	George Noriega, Jodi Marr	3:59
2.	"Para el Peor Amante"	María Victoria Sanchez Pérez	3:49
3.	"No Me Dejes Ir"	Claudia Brant, Andres Saavedra	3:38
4.	"Tócame"	George Noriega, Jodi Marr, Rob Wells, Caterina Torres	3:58
5.	"Tu Medicina"	Claudia Brant, Yoel Henriquez	4:14
6.	"La Pasión Tiene Memoria"	Yoel Henriquez, Erika Ender	3:33
7.	"Sin Pensar (Feat. Black Guayaba)"	Gustavo Gonzalez, Javier Morales, Carlos Colon	3:09
8.	"Alérgica al Amor"	Yoel Henriquez	4:12
9.	"Caída Libre"	Erika Ender, Manuel Moreno	3:06
10.	"Feliz a Escondidas"	Claudia Brant, Luis Fonsi, Nahuel Schajris	4:29
11.	"Desnuda (Feat. Arthur Hanlon)"	Claudia Brant, Alejandro Lerner	3:53
12.	"Un Gato en la Oscuridad"	Giancarlo Bigazzi, Totó Savio	3:51

== Personnel ==
- Bateria - Aaron Sterling
- Guitars - Alejandro Garcia
- Composer- Alejandro Lerner
- Composer, Engineer, Producer - Andrews Saavedra
- Featured Artist, Keyboards, Piano - Arthur Hanlon
- Guitars - Arturo Negron
- Coros, Featured Artist - Black:Guayaba
- Adaptation - Buddy McCluskey
- Bass, Guitars - Carlos "Tito" Ortiz
- Composer, Organ - Carlos Colon
- Creative Director - Carlos R. Perez
- Composer - Caterina Torres
- Mixing - Charles Dye
- Mixing - Chris Anderson
- Composer - Claudia Brant
- Guitars - Dan Warner
- Coros - Diane Williams
- Coros - Donna Allen
- Coros, Primary Artist - Eddie Nazario
- Management - Empreses Angelo Medina
- Composer - Erika Ender
- Engineer - Fabian Alicastro
- Translation - Fernando Osorio
- Bateria - Gabriel Calero
- Guitars, Producer - Gary Burnette
- Composer, Engineer, Producer - George Noriega
- Composer - Giancarlo Bigazzi
- Mixing - Gustavo Celis
- Composer - Gustavo Gonzalez
- Engineer, Keyboards, Mixing, Piano, Producer - Iker Gastaminza
- Composer, Guitar - Javier "Javi" Morales
- Keyboards, Piano - Jeff Babko
- Engineer - Jerald Romero
- Composer - Jodi Marr
- Engineer, Mixing - Joe Baldridge
- Bass - John Falcone
- Engineer - Jossip Serrano
- Bass - Julio Hernandez
- Bateria - Lee Levin
- Composer - Luis Fonsi
- Composer - Manuel Moreno
- Adaptation - Mary McCluskey
- Composer - Maria Victoria Sanchez Perez
- Mastering - Mike Couzzi
- Keyboards, Piano - Mike Rojas
- Composer - Nahuel Schajris
- Photography - Omar Cruz
- Arranger, Violin - Pedro Alfonso
- Engineer - Randy Cantor
- Composer - Rob Wells
- Engineer - Ruben Agosto
- Engineer, Mixing, Producer - Sebastian Krys
- Bateria - Shawn Fichter
- Bass - Steve Mackey
- Guitars - Tiene Memoria
- Coros - Tommy Torres
- Composer - Toto Savio
- Guitars - Troy Lancaster
- Coros - Wendy Pedersen
- Composer - Yoel Henriquez

== Tour ==
Desnuda El Concierto
- Tour by Ednita Nazario
- Promotional poster for Ednita's tour
- Associated album: Desnuda
- Start date: May 4, 2012
- End date: September 14, 2013
- Legs: 1
- No. of shows: 32

Ednita Nazario concert chronology
- Soy... El Concierto (2010–2012); Desnuda El Concierto (2012–2013); La Más Fuerte Tour (2014)

Desnuda El Concierto (also referred to as Desnuda Tour) is the concert tour by Ednita Nazario in support of her studio album Desnuda, produced by Angelo Medina. In her last musical production, Ednita began a journey of discovery what she shared with her fans all over the world. The album was particularly poignant since it was accompanied by moments of great happiness, becoming critical and sales success. Throughout the race Ednita prolific and diverse, she has won countless awards and recognitions, and excelled in many artistic endeavors.

=== Tour dates ===
Date	City	Country	Venue
North America
May 4, 2012	San Juan	Puerto Rico	Coliseo de Puerto Rico
May 5, 2012	San Juan	Puerto Rico	Coliseo de Puerto Rico
May 6, 2012	San Juan	Puerto Rico	Coliseo de Puerto Rico
June 15, 2012	Caguas	Puerto Rico	Paseo De Las Artes
June 16, 2012	Ponce	Puerto Rico	Plaza Las Delicias
July 11, 2012^{[A]}	Mayagüez	Puerto Rico	Parque del Litoral
July 14, 2012	Vieques	Puerto Rico	Plaza Pública
July 20, 2012^{[B]}	Las Piedras	Puerto Rico	Desvío Industrial
July 21, 2012	Hatillo	Puerto Rico	Plaza Pública
July 25, 2012	Santa Isabel	Puerto Rico	Luis G. Moreno Stadium
August 11, 2012	Cayey	Puerto Rico	Municipal Parking Lot
August 18, 2012	Adjuntas	Puerto Rico	Plaza de Recreo Aristides Moll Boscana
September 1, 2012	Barranquitas	Puerto Rico	Pabellón de las Artes y la Juventud
September 2, 2012	Juana Díaz	Puerto Rico	Juana Díaz Mall
September 8, 2012	Jayuya	Puerto Rico	Filiberto Garcia Sports Complex
September 29, 2012	Cabo Rojo	Puerto Rico	Coliseo Rebekah Colberg Cabrera
October 11, 2012	Aguadilla	Puerto Rico	Plaza Rafael Hernández
October 14, 2012	Canóvanas	Puerto Rico	Plaza de Recreo
October 19, 2012	Carolina	Puerto Rico	Plaza Pública Rey Fernando
October 20, 2012^{[C]}	Mayagüez	Puerto Rico	Cervecera de Puerto Rico
October 26, 2012^{[D]}	Ponce	Puerto Rico	Ponce Hilton Golf & Casino Resort
October 27, 2012	Maunabo	Puerto Rico	Coliseo Municipal
January 13, 2013	Guaynabo	Puerto Rico	Concha Acústica
February 3, 2013	Coamo	Puerto Rico	Velódromo de Coamo
April 14, 2013	Tampa	United States	Busch Gardens
June 27, 2013	Río Grande	Puerto Rico	Ovidio de Jesus Stadium
July 7, 2013	Aibonito	Puerto Rico	Annex to José Marrón Aponte Coliseum
July 20, 2013	Hatillo	Puerto Rico	Plaza Pública
August 17, 2013	Cayey	Puerto Rico	Pedro Montañez Stadium
September 4, 2013	Naranjito	Puerto Rico	Plaza Pública
September 14, 2013	Miami	United States	Miami Dade County Auditorium
November 16, 2013^{[E]}	San Juan	Puerto Rico	Coliseo de Puerto Rico

Festivals and other miscellaneous performances
^{A} These concert is part of the "Feria Carnaval Turismo de Puerto Rico y el Caribe".
^{B} These concert is part of the "Festival Artesanal Pedreño".
^{C} These concert is part of the "OktoberFest 2012"
^{D} These concert is part of a benefit gala for the Go-Gogo Foundation.
^{E} These concert is part of the KQ Concert.

Cancellations and rescheduled shows

May 11, 2012	Caguas, Puerto Rico	Paseo de las Artes	Rescheduled to June 15, 2012
May 12, 2012	Ponce, Puerto Rico	Plaza Las Delicias	Rescheduled to June 16, 2012
July 15, 2012	Villalba, Puerto Rico	Plaza de Festivales	Cancelled
July 28, 2012	Santa Isabel, Puerto Rico	Municipal Parking Lot	Rescheduled to July 25, 2012

=== Box office score data ===
Venue	City	Tickets Sold / Available	Gross Revenue
Coliseo de Puerto Rico	San Juan	28,897 / 30,176 (96%)	$1,932,192
TOTAL		28,897 / 30,176 (96%)	$1,932,192

== Charts ==
Chart (2009)	Peak position
US Billboard 200	67
US Billboard Top Latin Albums	1
US Billboard Latin Pop Albums	1

== See also ==
- List of number-one Billboard Latin Albums from the 2010s
