= Ven Junto a Mi =

1994 song by Claudio Bermúdez

Single by Claudio Bermúdez

from the album Como Aire Fresco
- Released: 1994
- Recorded: 1994
- Genre: Latin pop
- Label: Rodven Records
- Composer: Claudio Bermúdez
- Producer: Rafael Pérez Botija

Claudio Bermúdez singles chronology
| "Ven Junto a Mi" (1994) | ""Tu Eres Mi Refugio" (1995) |

"Ven Junto a Mi" ("Come Next to Me") is a written and performed by Mexican singer Claudio Bermúdez on his 1994 debut album Como Aire Fresco The album marked his career as a soloist following his departure from Timbiriche in 1991. It was produced by Spanish composer Rafael Pérez-Botija and released as a single in 1994. The song became a number one hit on the Billboard Latin Pop Airplay chart in 1995 where it spent seven weeks on top of the chart. It was recognized as one of best-performing songs of the year at the 1996 ASCAP Latin Awards. Despite its success, it became his only number one song on the chart and Bermúdez later became a composer and record producer for other artists. The song has been covered by Victor Roque y su Gran Manzana, Johnny Rivera, and Encadenado.

== Charts ==
=== Weekly charts ===
| Chart (1995) | Peak position |
|---|---|
| US Hot Latin Songs (Billboard) | 7 |
| US Latin Pop Airplay (Billboard) | 1 |

=== Year-end charts ===
| Chart (1995) | Peak position |
|---|---|
| US Latin Pop Airplay (Billboard) | 3 |

== See also ==
- List of number-one Billboard Latin Pop Airplay songs of 1995
