= Con Tu Amor (Cristian Castro song) =

1994 song by Cristian Castro

Single by Cristian Castro

from the album El Camino del Alma
- Released: 1994
- Recorded: 1994
- Genre: Latin pop
- Length: 3:53
- Label: Melody, Fonovisa
- Songwriters: Daniel Garcia, Mario Schajris
- Producer: Alejandro Zepeda

Cristian Castro singles chronology
"Mañana" (1994)	"Con Tu Amor" (1994)	"Azul Gris" (1995)

"Con Tu Amor" (English: "With Your Love") is a song written by Daniel Garcia and Mario Schajris and performed by Mexican singer Cristian Castro. It was released as the second single from his album El Camino del Alma. It became his second number one song on the Billboard Latin Pop Airplay chart in 1995. It was recognized as one of best-performing songs of the year at the 1996 ASCAP Latin Awards. A live version of the song was included on Castro's album En Primera Fila: Día 2 (2014). The song was covered by Cuban salsa singer Guianko on his album Mi Forma de Sentir (1998). A music video was filmed for this single.

== Charts ==
=== Weekly charts ===
Chart (1995)	Peak position
US Hot Latin Songs (Billboard)	4
US Latin Pop Airplay (Billboard)	1

=== Year-end charts ===
Chart (1995)	Peak position
US Latin Songs (Billboard)	22
US Latin Pop Airplay (Billboard)	4

== See also ==
- List of Billboard Latin Pop Airplay number ones of 1995
