= Sabath =

Family name

Sabath may refer to:

- A. J. Sabath, American politician, former Commissioner of Labor and Workforce Development in New Jersey
- Adolph J. Sabath (1866–1952), member of the U.S. House of Representatives
- Frankie Sabath, Puerto Rican entertainer
- Sabath Mele (born 1923), American former right fielder, manager, coach and scout in Major League Baseball
- Karol Sabath (born 1963), Polish paleontologist paleoartist and biologist.
- SABATH italian rmxr and producer of italian songs, mostly are trap rap or punk.

== See also ==
- Sabbath (disambiguation)
