= Real... En Vivo =

Live album by Ednita Nazario
- Released: September 9, 2008
- Recorded: May 2, 3 & 4, 2008
- Genres: Latin Pop, Rock, Pop
- Length: 52:15 (Live album)
- Label: Norte • Sony BMG

Ednita Nazario chronology
Real (2007)	Real... En Vivo (2008)	Soy (2009)

Real... En Vivo is the 24th album and fifth live album by Puerto Rican singer Ednita Nazario. It was recorded live in the Coliseo de Puerto Rico, with over 60,000 in attendance. The show featured artists Ricky Martin and Tommy Torres performing classics with Nazario. The album debuted on Billboard 200 Albums at #57 selling over 8,658 in its first week.

== Track listings ==
CD Track Listing

1. Después De Ti - 03:38
2. No Me Dejes... No (Give A Little Bit) / Última Vez / Eres Libre - 06:34
3. Real - 05:28
4. Alguien Más - 03:45
5. Mi Corazón Tiene Mente Propia / Como Antes - 04:14
6. Todavía - 03:22
7. Puedo - 04:25
8. Tú Sabes Bien (Feat. Tommy Torres) - 03:55
9. Cuando No Te Queden Lágrimas - 04:39
10. Química Ideal (Feat. Ricky Martin) - 04:43
11. No - 04:04
12. No Te Mentía - 03:48

DVD Track Listing

1. Después De Ti
2. Espíritu Libre
3. Más Mala Que Tú / A Que Me Pides Más
4. No Me Dejes... No / Última Vez / Eres Libre
5. Real
6. Alguien Más
7. Mi Corazón Tiene Mente Propia / Como Antes
8. Pienso En Ti
9. Todavía
10. Puedo
11. Me Quedo
12. Tú Sabes Bien
13. Pegadito
14. Days of Innocence
15. Cuando No Te Queden Lágrimas
16. Química Ideal
17. No
18. Vengada
19. Si No Me Amas / La Prohibida / Aprenderé
20. No Te Mentía
21. Más Grande Que Grande

== Charts ==
Chart (2007)	Peak position	Certification
U.S. Billboard 200 albums	57	(30,000+)
U.S. Billboard Top Latin Albums	4	(30,000+)
U.S. Billboard Latin Pop Albums	2	(30,000+)
Puerto Rico Top 100 Albums	3	(30,000+)

== Awards ==
=== Billboard Latin Music Awards ===
Year	Award	Result
2009	Top Latin Album of the Year-Female	Nominated
