= El Playlist de Anoche =

Studio album by Tommy Torres
- Released: July 23, 2021
- Recorded: 2021
- Genre: Latin Pop
- Label: Rimas Entertainment
- Producers: Tommy Torres; Bad Bunny; Joel Iglesias

Tommy Torres chronology
12 Historias (2012)	El Playlist de Anoche (2021)

El Playlist de Anoche (English: Last Night's Playlist) is the fifth studio album by Puerto Rican Latin pop artist Tommy Torres, released on July 23, 2021. The album was co-written and co-produced by Torres and Bad Bunny.

== Background ==
After releasing his last album 12 Historias in 2012, Tommy Torres spent the following years releasing singles both as a solo artist and featuring other artists such as Daddy Yankee, Sebastián Yatra, and Gaby Moreno. In early 2021, Torres signed with Rimas Entertainment after spending the last 11 years under Warner Music.

Signing with Rimas led to Torres collaborating with Bad Bunny, who expressed interest in writing songs with him, and both artists spent a couple of weeks in West Hollywood writing and producing what became the album.

Bad Bunny said via Rolling Stone, "I'm very proud of this album. I wanted to work in this record because making music is something that fills me."

== Track listing ==
All tracks are written by Tommy Torres and Bad Bunny.

No.	Title	Producer(s)	Length
1.	"Toda la Noche"	Tommy Torres, Bad Bunny, Joel Iglesias	2:06
2.	"Como Tu Decías"	Torres, Bad Bunny	3:27
3.	"Cactus"	Torres, Bad Bunny	3:21
4.	"No Lo Quiero Dañar"	Torres, Bad Bunny	3:05
5.	"Marea"	Torres, Bad Bunny	3:14
6.	"No Prometo Nada"	Torres, Bad Bunny	3:47
7.	"Demasiado Amor"	Torres, Bad Bunny	3:02
8.	"Quisiera Ser El"	Torres, Bad Bunny	2:58
9.	"Inmortal"	Torres, Bad Bunny	3:45

== Charts ==
=== Weekly charts ===
Chart (2021)	Peak position
US Top Latin Albums (Billboard)	7
US Latin Pop Albums (Billboard)	2

=== Year-end charts ===
Chart (2021)	Position
US Top Latin Albums (Billboard)	88
