= Vuélveme a Querer (Cristian Castro song) =

Single by Cristian Castro

from the album Boleros: Por Amor y Desamor
- Released: 1995
- Recorded: 1995
- Genre: Latin pop
- Length: 4:09
- Label: Melody, Fonovisa
- Songwriter: Jorge Avendaño Lührs
- Producer: Jorge Avendaño Lührs

Cristian Castro singles chronology
"Morelia" (1995)	"Vuélveme a Querer" (1995)	"Amor" (1995)

Audio sample
- A 24 second sample of Vuélveme a Querer by Cristian Castro.: file; help

"Vuélveme a Querer" (English: "Love Me Again") is a song written and produced by Jorge Avendaño Lührs and performed by Mexican recording artist Cristian Castro for the compilation album Boleros: Por Amor y Desamor (1995). The song speaks of a protagonist who yearns for his lover to return. In the United States, the song peaked at number two on the Billboard Hot Latin Songs and number one on the Billboard Latin Pop Songs chart. It received a Billboard Latin Music Award and a Lo Nuestro nomination for Pop Song of the Year the following year. Avendaño received an award in the Pop/Rock category at the American Society of Composers, Authors and Publishers (ASCAP) Awards of 1997

== Background and lyrics ==
Boleros Por Amor y Desamor is a compilation album released by Fonovisa in 1995, which features various artists performing boleros written and produced by Mexican songwriter Jorge Avendaño Lührs. Mexican singer-songwriter Cristian Castro was among the selected artists to record a song for the album. Avendaño had previously composed the song "Morelia" for Castro for the telenovela of the same name. In the song, the protagonist yearns for his lover to return. In 2012, Castro re-recorded the song for his first live album En Primera Fila: Día 1 which released in 2013. The new version was recorded live in Los Angeles, California which arranged by Matt Rolling and produced Aureo Baqueiro.

== Reception ==
"Vuélveme a Querer" debuted at number fifteen on the Billboard Hot Latin Songs chart for the week of 9 September 1995. The song climbed to the top ten on the week of 30 September 1995 and peaked at number two nine weeks later with the number-one spot being held by Enrique Iglesias's song "Si Tú Te Vas". The song debuted on the Billboard Latin Pop Songs chart at number thirteen. It reached number-one on the chart on the week of 23 September 1995 replacing "La Tierra del Olvido" by Carlos Vives and was succeeded by Gloria Estefan's song "Más Allá" fourteen weeks later. The song reached number two in Mexico City.

In 1996, "Vuélveme a Querer" received a Billboard Latin Music Award for Pop Song of the Year. It was also nominated for Pop Song of the Year at the 8th Lo Nuestro Awards which went to Enrique Iglesias for his song "Si Tú Te Vas". Avendaño was awarded at the 1997 American Society of Composers, Authors and Publishers in the Pop/Rock category for the song.

== Charts ==
=== Weekly charts ===
Chart (1995)	Peak position
US Latin Songs (Billboard)	2
US Latin Pop Songs (Billboard)	1

=== Year-end charts ===
Chart (1995)	Peak position
US Latin Songs (Billboard)	27
US Latin Pop Songs (Billboard)	5
Chart (1996)	Peak position
US Latin Songs (Billboard)	24

=== All-time charts ===
Chart (2017)	Peak position
US Latin Pop Songs (Billboard)	12

== See also ==
- List of Billboard Latin Pop Airplay number ones of 1994 and 1995
