= Metamorfosis (Ednita Nazario album) =

Studio album by Ednita Nazario
- Released: 1992
- Genre: Latin pop
- Label: EMI Latin
- Producer: Ednita Nazario; K. C. Porter

Ednita Nazario chronology
Lo Que Son Las Cosas (1991)	Metamorfosis (1992)	Live (1994)

Metamorfosis (Metamorphosis) is the 12th studio album of Puerto Rican singer Ednita Nazario. It was released in 1992 and was nominated for Pop Album of the Year at the 6th Lo Nuestro Awards.

== Track listing ==
1. "Mírame"
2. "Metamorfosis"
3. "La Cantante"
4. "Un Corazón Hecho Pedazos"
5. "Te Quedas en Mí"
6. "Tres Deseos"
7. "Tanto Nos Amamos"
8. "Y Te Vas"
9. "Un Hombre para Mí"

== Singles ==
1. "Tanto Nos Amamos"
2. "Mírame"
3. "Tres Deseos"
4. "Y Te Vas"
5. "Un Corazón Hecho Pedazos"
6. "Metamorfosis"

== Chart performance ==
Chart (1993)	Peak position
US Billboard Latin Pop Albums	10

== Personnel ==
- Produced by Ednita Nazario and K. C. Porter
