= Real (Ednita Nazario album) =

2007 studio album by Ednita Nazario

Studio album by Ednita Nazario
- Released: December 11, 2007
- Recorded: 2007
- Studios: Angel Recording Studios (London, England); Middle Ear (Nashville, TN); Cosmos Studios (Mexico City, Mexico); Ike's Garage; Sonic Projects Studios; The Tiki Room (Miami, FL)
- Genres: Latin pop; pop rock; soft rock; latin rock; latin ballad
- Length: 50:48
- Language: Spanish
- Label: Norte • Sony BMG
- Producers: Jacobo Calderón; José Luis de la Peña; Tommy Torres; Claudia Brant; Sebastián Krys; Andrés Castro; Ednita Nazario; Homero Patrón; Armando Ávila; Juan Carlos Noguel; Graeme Pleeth; Iker Gastamiza; Alejandro García; Cristian Zalles

Ednita Nazario chronology
Apasionada Live (2006)	Real (2007)	Real... En Vivo (2008)

Singles from Real
- 1. "No Te Mentía" Released: October 15, 2007; 2. "Después De Tí" Released: January 7, 2008; 3. "No (with Natalia Jiménez)" Released: May 5, 2008; 4. "Alguien Más" Released: July 28, 2008; 5. "Cuando No Te Queden Lágrimas" Released: October 20, 2008

Real is the 23rd album and 19th studio album recorded by Puerto Rican-American singer-songwriter Ednita Nazario. The album witch released by Sony BMG Norte on December 11, 2007 (see 2007 in music). The first single of this album are No te Mentía (English: I Was Not Lying). After the warm welcome to the lead single, "No te Mentía", the album is ready to go to market on December 11. "Real" includes a work by producer Jacobo Calderón, José Luis de la Peña, Tommy Torres, Cristian Zalles, Claudia Brant, Sebastián Krys, Andrés Castro, by himself Ednita Nazario, Homero Patrón, Armando Ávila (La 5ª Estación), Juan Carlos Noguel, Graeme Pleeth (Sonique) and Iker Gastamiza and Alejandro García. Is the album number 23 of Ednita, "Real", was recorded between London, Nashville, Mexico City and Miami. The album debuted at No. 1 in Billboard's Top Latin Albums and Top Latin Pop Albums, selling about 18,067 in one week. The album received nomination a "Latin Grammy Award for Best Female Pop Vocal Album" in the 9th Annual Latin Grammy Awards on November 13, 2008, losing to Cualquier Día (2007) by Kany García.

== Track listing ==
No.	Title	Writer(s)	Length
1.	"Alguien Más"	Rafael Esparza-Ruíz · Erika Ender · Jonny Mead	4:10
2.	"Todavía"	Yoe Henríquez · Rafael Esparza-Ruíz	3:36
3.	"No" (with Natalia Jiménez)	Armando Ávila · Natalia Jiménez	3:50
4.	"Me Quedo"	Claudia Brant · Mark Portmann	4:16
5.	"No Te Mentía"	Claudia Brant · Jorge Luis Piloto	3:40
6.	"Puedo"	Juan Carlos Pérez Soto · Alih Jey · Eduardo Osorio	3:18
7.	"Después de Ti"	Claudia Brant · Mark Portmann	3:43
8.	"Hoy"	Ángel Reyero · Armando Ávila	2:58
9.	"Cuestión de Tiempo"	Rafael Esparza-Ruíz · Erika Ender	3:38
10.	"Cuando No Te Queden Lágrimas"	Claudia Brant · Mark Portmann	4:45
11.	"Azul" (with Reyli Barba)	Reyli Barba Arrocha · Kiko Cibrián	4:04
12.	"Days of Innocence"	Juan Carlos Pérez Soto · Ednita Nazario · Jason Phelps	4:05
13.	"Real"	Naldo	5:04
Total length:			50:48

== Singles ==
- "No Te Mentía" (2007)
- "Después de Ti" (2008)
- "No" (2008)
- "Alguien Más" (2008)
- "Cuando No Te Queden Lágrimas" (2008)

== Awards ==
=== Billboard Latin Music Awards ===
Year	Award	Result
2008	Latin Female Pop Album of the Year	Nominated

=== Latin Grammy Awards ===
Year	Award	Result
2008	Best Female Pop Vocal Album	Nominated

== Personnel ==
- Vocals – Ednita Nazario
- Featurings – Reily Barba, Natalia Jiménez
- Keyboards – Bob Patin
- Bass – Gary Lunn
- Guitar – Michael Spriggs (acoustic), Gary Burnette(electric)
- Percussion – Brian Fullen
- Engineer: Graeme Pleeth
- Vocal Producer – Cristian Zalles
- Background Vocals – Cristian Zalles

© MMVII. SONY BMG MUSIC ENTERTAINMENT (US Latin) LLC.

== Charts ==
Album Charts
Year	Chart	Position
2007	Billboard Top Latin Albums	1
2007	Billboard Latin Pop Albums	1
2007	The Billboard 200	101
