= Confesados =

Single by Ednita Nazario

from the album Soy
- Released: January 11, 2010
- Recorded: 2009
- Genre: Pop, Latin Pop
- Length: 4:06
- Label: Sony BMG
- Songwriter: Tommy Torres

Ednita Nazario singles chronology
"'Sin Querer" (2009)	"Confesados" (2010)	"La Fuerza de un Te Quiero" (2010)

Alternative covers
- 2010 promo cover

"Confesados" (Confessed) is the second single of Ednita Nazario's album Soy. According to Ednita Nazario, this composition is one of their favorites. The ballad is clearly erotic, though not explicit, we portray the game before an intimate encounter.

== Music video ==
The cold that has prevailed in recent days in what is called the Sun City became his accomplice as during the long hours of recording many times the heat becomes unbearable. One of the oldest buildings in Downtown Miami, which is now abandoned, was the place chosen to give lim esto es una mierda

== Charts ==
Chart (2010)	Peak position
US Hot Latin Songs (Billboard)	46
