= Soy (Ednita Nazario album) =

Studio album by Ednita Nazario
- Released: October 27, 2009
- Recorded: 2008–09
- Genres: Latin pop, rock, pop
- Length: 43:59
- Label: Sony Latin
- Producers: Tommy Torres, Sebastián Krys, Graeme Pleeth

Ednita Nazario chronology
Real... En Vivo (2008)	Soy (2009)	Desnuda (2012)

Singles from Soy
- 1. "Sin Querer" Released: September 21, 2009; 2. "Confesados" Released: January 11, 2010; 3. "La Fuerza de un Te Quiero" Released: April 5, 2010; 4. "Sé Que Voy a Reir" Released: July 19, 2010

"Soy" (I Am) is the 25th album and 20th studio album recorded by Puerto Rican singer Ednita Nazario, it was released on October 27, 2009. As a rock musician, Ednita never ceases to amaze with their musical selections. And this time is joined by some of the most important composers of the industry, including Rafael Esparza, Tommy Thompson, Claudia Brant, Samo (rock pop group Camila), and Mark Portman.

The Puerto Rican and also a close friend of Ednita, Tommy Torres is also one of the producers who account this new album, scheduled to release October 27, 2009. Two other producers who collaborate with Ednita to make this project a flawless are Sebastian Krys and Graeme Pleeth.

== Track listing ==
No.	Title	Composer	Length
1.	"Me Voy"	Erika Ender, Jonathan Mead, Rafael Esparza	3:50
2.	"Sin Querer"	Rafael López, Samo	3:48
3.	"Déjame Ser"	Erika Ender, David Levitt, Victor Indrizzo, Francesco Sondelli, Rafael Esparza	3:44
4.	"Confesados"	Tommy Torres	4:06
5.	"Sin Pausas"	Ednita Nazario, Rafael Esparza, Pedro Capó	3:38
6.	"Intoxicándome"	Claudia Brant, Mark Portmann	3:49
7.	"Dos Eternidades"	Nicole Witt, Cristian Zalles, Nick Carter, Gilles Godard, Andrew Fromm	3:54
8.	"Yo Quiero Más"	Ednita Nazario, Rafael Esparza	3:36
9.	"Soy Como Soy"	Iker Gastaminza, Cristian Zalles	3:20
10.	"Mi Libertad"	Ednita Nazario, Jaime Ciero, Rafael Esparza	3:26
11.	"Sé Que Voy a Reir"	Mauricio Gasca, Yoel Heríquez	3:13
12.	"La Fuerza de un Te Quiero"	Claudia Brant, Mark Portmann	3:42

== Charts and sales ==
The album debuted at #1 on Billboard Top Latin Albums, becoming her third album to debut at that position. Also, the album notched the highest first-week sales for a female Latin act so far this year, surpassing Nelly Furtado's first-week sales for Mi Plan. The album so far has spent two weeks on top of the Billboard charts.

Chart (2009)	Peak position
U.S. Billboard 200 Albums	27
U.S. Billboard Top Latin Albums	1
U.S. Billboard Latin Pop Albums	1
Puerto Rico Top Albums	1

=== Sales ===
Region	Certification	Certified units/sales
United States	—	23,000

== Awards ==
=== 2010 Billboard Latin Music Awards ===
Category	Result
Top Latin Albums Artist of the Year, Female	Nominated
Latin Pop Album of the Year	Nominated
