= Espíritu Libre =

Studio album by Ednita Nazario
- Released: 1996
- Recorded: 1995–1996
- Genre: Latin pop
- Length: 44:08
- Label: EMI Latin
- Producers: Ednita Nazario; K. C. Porter

Ednita Nazario chronology
Pasiones (1994)	Espíritu Libre (1996)	Corazón (1999)

Espíritu Libre (Free Spirit) is the 15th album and 14th studio album of Puerto Rican singer Ednita Nazario. It was released on September 3, 1996. Two songs from the album, "Atada a Tu Volcán" and "Lloviendo Flores", reached #1 on the Latin Pop Airplay chart.

== Track listing ==
1. "Espíritu Libre" - 4:00 (Rodolfo Barreras)
2. "Atada a Tu Volcán" - 4:30 (Frank Ceara)
3. "Lloviendo Flores" - 3:42 (Rodolfo Barreras)
4. "Siento Que Te Acabas de Ir - 4:42 (Marco Flores)
5. "Figúrate" - 4:23 (Luis Ángel Márquez)
6. "Te Quiero" - 3:33 (Marco Flores)
7. "La Última Vez" - 3:52 (Gustavo Laureano)
8. "Desearía"- 3:53 (Marco Flores)
9. "No Te Pido Más" - 3:53 (José María Purón)
10. "No Puedo Sin Tu Amor" - 4:12 (Marco Flores, K.C. Porter, Mark Spiro)
11. "Templo de Mi Corazón" - 3:50 (Christina Aboroa, Pablo Aguirre)
12. "Lloviendo Flores" (Acoustic version) - 1:59 (Rodolfo Barreras)

== Singles ==
1. "Atada a Tu Volcán"
2. "Lloviendo Flores"
3. "Desearía"
4. "Espíritu Libre"
5. "No Te Pido Más"
6. "Siento Que Te Acabas de Ir"
7. "Te Quiero"

== Personnel ==
- Produced by Ednita Nazario and K. C. Porter
