= Al Rojo Vivo (album) =

1983 studio album by Ednita Nazario

Studio album by Ednita Nazario
- Released: 1983
- Studio: Counterpoint Studios
- Genre: Latin pop
- Label: Padosa Records
- Producer: Laureano Brizuela

Ednita Nazario chronology
Ednita (1982)	Al Rojo Vivo (1983)	Tú Sin Mí (1986)

Al Rojo Vivo (Red Hot) is the eighth studio album of Puerto Rican singer Ednita Nazario. It was released in 1983. In the United States, it bore her name as a title.

== Track listing ==
1. "Ese muchacho"
2. "Dicen"
3. "Frente a ella"
4. "Chico físico"
5. "La prohibida"
6. "Qué va"
7. "Hasta cuándo y hasta dónde"
8. "Mi pequeño amor"
9. "Mañana"
10. "Machismo"

== Singles ==
1. "La prohibida"
2. "Mi pequeño amor" (con Laureano Brizuela)
3. "Te amaría"
4. "Amándote"

== See also ==
- Ednita Nazario discography
- 1983 in Latin music
- 1983 in music
