= Vete Vete... =

Studio album by Ednita Nazario
- Released: 1977
- Genre: Latin pop
- Length: ??:??
- Label: Borinquen
- Producer: Darío González

Ednita Nazario chronology
Nueva Navidad (1976)	Vete Vete... (1977)	Mujer Sola (1978)

Vete, Vete... (Go Away, Go Away...) is the fourth studio album by Puerto Rican singer Ednita Nazario. It was released in 1977 by Borinquen Records.

== Track listing ==
1. "Mi Remedio Es Cantar"
2. "Abrázame"
3. "Como Es Grande Mi Amor por Ti"
4. "Ya, Ya... (Déjame en Paz)"
5. "Verde Amor" (Ever Green)
6. "Yo Lo Siento Ahora" (Sir Duke)
7. "Vete Vete"
8. "Aquí Estoy Yo"

== Personnel ==
- Produced by Darío González
