= Apasionada (album) =

Studio album by Ednita Nazario
- Released: June 21, 2005
- Recorded: 2004–05
- Genre: Latin pop
- Length: 43:55
- Label: Norte • Sony BMG
- Producers: Ednita Nazario; Tommy Torres

Ednita Nazario chronology
Por Tí (2003)	Apasionada (2005)	Apasionada Live (2006)

Apasionada (Passionate) is the 21st album and 18th studio album of Puerto Rican singer Ednita Nazario. It was released on 21 June 2005.

== Track listing ==
1. "Vengada"
2. "Ni Héroes ni Vencidos"
3. "Por Hoy"
4. "A Que Me Pides Más"
5. "A Mí Sí Que No"
6. "Sobrevivo"
7. "Agua Profunda"
8. "Olvidarte"
9. "Mariposa"
10. "Una y Otra Vez"

== Singles ==
1. "Vengada"
2. "Ni Heroes Ni Vencidos"
3. "A Que Me Pides Más"

== Personnel ==
- Produced by Ednita Nazario and Tommy Torres
