= Mañana, Mañana =

1994 single by Cristian Castro

"Mañana"

Single by Cristian Castro

from the album El Camino del Alma
- Released: 1994
- Recorded: 1994
- Genre: Latin pop
- Length: 4:22
- Label: Melody, Fonovisa
- Songwriter: Juan Gabriel
- Producer: Alejandro Zepeda

Cristian Castro singles chronology
| "Por Amor a Ti" (1994) | "Mañana" (1994) | "Con Tu Amor" (1994) |

Audio sample
- A 24-second sample of Cristian Castro's cover Juan Gabriel's "Mañana, Mañana". Castro had approached Gabriel requesting permission to cover the song.: file; help

"Mañana"

Promotional single by Cristian Castro

from the album En Primera Fila: Día 1
- Released: 19 March 2013
- Recorded: 2012
- Genre: Latin pop
- Length: 3:59
- Label: Sony Music Latin
- Songwriter: Juan Gabriel
- Producer: Aureo Baqueiro

"Mañana, Mañana" (English: "Tomorrow, Tomorrow") is a song written by Mexican singer-songwriter Juan Gabriel. Argentine singer Libertad Lamarque performed the song in the Mexican movie La loca de los milagros (filmed 1973, premiered 1975). Juan Gabriel released his recording of the song, a duet with Estela Nuñez, on his album Ella (1979). The song describes the departure of a lost love who will never return.

In 1994, Mexican singer Cristian Castro covered the song on his album El Camino del Alma as "Mañana", where it was released as the lead single from the album by Fonovisa. Castro's cover peaked at number-two on the Billboard Hot Latin Songs chart and became the first number-one single on the Billboard Latin Pop Songs chart. A year later, the song received an American Society of Composers, Authors and Publishers award for Pop/Contemporary Song.

== Background and lyrics ==
"Mañana, Mañana" was written by Mexican singer-songwriter Juan Gabriel, who performs it in his album Ella (1979). Previously, the song had been prominently featured in the Mexican movie La loca de los milagros (1975), where it is sung by Argentine leading lady Libertad Lamarque. Juan Gabriel's recording features Mexican singer Estela Núñez. Lyrically, it tells of the departure of a love who leaves tomorrow and will never come back again.

In 1994, Mexican recording artist Cristian Castro covered the song on his third studio album, El Camino del Alma, under the title "Mañana". According to Juan Gabriel, Castro had approached him to request recording the song for the album during Gabriel's hiatus from singing. Castro's version of the song was produced by Alejandro Zepeda and was released as the lead single from the album by Fonovisa. The music video for the song draws inspirations from the film, Dracula. In 2013, Castro re-recorded the song for his live album En Primera Fila: Día 1.

== Reception ==
"Mañana" debuted at number 26 on the Billboard Hot Latin Songs chart on the week of 27 August 1994. The song climbed to the top ten on the week of 10 September 1994 and peaked at number two nine weeks later with the number-one spot being held by Selena's song "Bidi Bidi Bom Bom". It ended 1994 as the sixteenth best-performing Latin song of the year.

On the Billboard Latin Pop Songs chart, the song holds the distinction of being the first number-one song on the chart. It was succeeded by Luis Miguel's cover of "El Día Que Me Quieras" the following week. The song reached number three on the ballad hit parade chart in Mexico City. In 1995, "Mañana" was nominated "Pop Song of the Year" at the 1995 Lo Nuestro Awards, but lost to "Pero Que Necesidad" by Juan Gabriel. In the same year, Gabriel earned the American Society of Composers, Authors and Publishers award for Pop/Contemporary Song for "Mañana".

== Charts ==
Weekly charts
| Chart (1994) | Peak position |
|---|---|
| US Hot Latin Songs (Billboard) | 2 |
| US Latin Pop Airplay (Billboard) | 1 |

Year-end charts
| Chart (1994) | Peak position |
|---|---|
| US Latin Songs (Billboard) | 16 |

== See also ==
- List of Billboard Latin Pop Airplay number ones of 1994 and 1995
