= El Corazón Decide =

Studio album by Ednita Nazario
- Released: October 22, 2013
- Genres: Latin pop; rock; pop
- Length: 43:04
- Label: Sony Latin

Ednita Nazario chronology
Desnuda (2012)	El Corazón Decide (2013)	Una Vida (2017)

Singles from El Corazón Decide
- 1. "La Más Fuerte" Released: September 16, 2013; 2. "A Mí No" Released: January 10, 2014; 3. "Llorar por Ti" Released: April 24, 2014; 4. "Así Es la Vida Sin Ti" Released: September 24, 2014; 5. "Empezar a Vivir" Released: January 14, 2015

El Corazón Decide (The Heart Decide) is the 27th album and 22nd studio album recorded by Puerto Rican singer Ednita Nazario. It was released worldwide on October 22, 2013. The album was recorded in Miami and London; and contains songs from international artists like Pedro Capó, Leonel García and Kany Garcia, who composed the first single from the album La Más Fuerte. The album follows the same musical and lyrical formula of her last previous recordings.

== Track listing ==
No.	Title	Composer	Length
1.	"El Corazón Decide"	Angie Chirino, Tim Mitchell, George Noriega	04:17
2.	"Olvídame"	Jodi Marr, George Noriega	04:39
3.	"A Mí No"	Victoria Gastelo	03:27
4.	"Te Tengo a Ti"	Justin Daniels, Jean Rodriguez, Raquel Sofía	04:07
5.	"Empezar a Vivir"	Rafael Esparza-Ruiz, Salvador Rizo	03:59
6.	"No Quiero Tus Besos"	Victoria Gastelo	03:45
7.	"Así Es la Vida Sin Ti"	Arturo Medina Capiro, Leonel García	04:18
8.	"La Más Fuerte"	Kany Garcia	03:32
9.	"Llorar por Ti"	Pedro Capó, Rafael Esparza-Ruiz	04:04
10.	"No Quererte"	Claudia Brant, Mark Portmann	03:12
11.	"Vale la Pena"	Claudia Brant, Ednita Nazario	03:54
