= Fuerza De Gravedad =

Fuerza de Gravedad

Studio album by Ednita Nazario
- Released: 1989
- Genre: Latin pop
- Label: Fonovisa
- Producer: Joe Lamont; Ednita Nazario

Ednita Nazario chronology
Tú Sin Mí (1986)	Fuerza de Gravedad (1989)	Lo Que Son Las Cosas (1991)

Fuerza de Gravedad (Gravity Force) is the tenth studio album of Puerto Rican singer Ednita Nazario. It was released in 1989.

== Track listing ==
1. "Fuerza de Gravedad"
2. "Aprenderé"
3. "De Todos Modos" (with Russell Hitchcock)
4. "Operadora"
5. "Lo Mejor de Ti"
6. "Mi Corazón Tiene Mente Propia"
7. "No Te Enamores de Mí"
8. "Contigo, Mi Amor"
9. "Música Eléctrica"
10. "Antes y Después de Ti"

== Singles ==
1. "Aprenderé"
2. "De Todos Modos"
3. "Mi Corazón Tiene Mente Propia"
4. "Contigo, Mi Amor"
5. "Lo Mejor de Ti"

== Personnel ==
- Produced by Joe Lamont and Ednita Nazario
