= Una Vida (Ednita Nazario album) =

Studio album by Ednita Nazario
- Released: April 28, 2017
- Genre: Latin pop
- Label: Sony Latin

Ednita Nazario chronology
El Corazón Decide (2013)	Una Vida (2017)	La Más Loca (2020)

Singles from Una Vida
- 1. "Eras Uno Más" Released: October 6, 2015; 2. "Ya No Me Duele Tanto" Released: January 22, 2016; 3. "Ni una Lágrima (Bandolero)" Released: April 7, 2017; 4. "Adiós" Released: July 21, 2017

Una Vida (A Life) is the 28th album and 23rd studio album recorded by Puerto Rican singer Ednita Nazario. It was released on April 28, 2017.

== Track listing ==
No.	Title	Composer	Length
1.	"Ángel de cristal"	Yadam González, Omar Alfanno	4:02
2.	"Ni una lágrima (Bandolero)"	Descemer Bueno, Alfonso Ordoñez, Juan Cristobal Losada	3:04
3.	"Solo una vez ft. Axel"	Daniel Sartori, Axel	3:50
4.	"Ya no me duele tanto"	Claudia Brant, Ricky Montaner	4:15
5.	"Adiós"	Pablo Preciado Rojas	3:43
6.	"Ser tu amigo ft. Gilberto Santa Rosa"	Manuel Ramos Quintana	4:03
7.	"Loca ft. Albita"	Maximino Rivera	3:19
8.	"Soy tuya"	Fabiola Ramos	3:55
9.	"Eras uno más"	Yoel Henriquez, Mauricio Gasca	3:45
10.	"A little love ft. Happy Colors"	Adam Preston Barragan	3:14
11.	"Hoy brindaré"	Juan Diego Medina Vélez, Christhian Mena, Johnattan Ballesteros, Harold Gómez, Ednita Nazario, Edil David Daza	3:16
