= Ednita =

Studio album by Ednita Nazario
- Released: 1982
- Genre: Latin pop
- Label: Padosa
- Producer: Laureano Brizuela

Ednita Nazario chronology
Retrato De Mujer (1979)	Ednita (1982)	Al Rojo Vivo (1983)

Ednita is the seventh studio album by the Puerto Rican pop singer Ednita Nazario, released in 1982 by Padosa Records.

== Track listing ==
1. "A Que No Le Cuentas"
2. "Así Eres Tú"
3. "Antes del Amor"
4. "Cuando Tú Te Vayas"
5. "Yo Soy la Mujer"
6. "Por Todo lo Que Perdimos"
7. "Así Era Él"
8. "Amándote"
9. "Me Quedo Aquí Abajo"
10. "Por un Amor (Mírame)"

== Singles ==
1. "A Que No Le Cuentas"
2. "Me Quedo Aquí Abajo"
3. "Yo Soy la Mujer"
4. "Antes del Amor"

== Personnel ==
- Produced by Laureano Brizuela
