= Lo Que Son Las Cosas =

Studio album by Ednita Nazario
- Released: 1991
- Genre: Dance-pop; Latin pop; merengue; tropical; salsa
- Length: 40:22
- Label: Capitol; EMI Latin
- Producer: Ednita Nazario; K. C. Porter

Ednita Nazario chronology
Fuerza De Gravedad (1989)	Lo Que Son Las Cosas (1991)	Metamorfosis (1992)

Professional ratings
Review scores
Source	Rating
AllMusic	3.5/5 stars

Lo Que Son Las Cosas is the eleventh studio album by the Puerto Rican singer Ednita Nazario. The album was released in 1991, on Capitol, and EMI Latin.

The album was a commercial success, reaching number 5 on the Latin Pop Albums Chart. six singles were issued from Lo Que Son Las Cosas: "Después de Tanto", "Eres Libre", "Lo Que Son Las Cosas", "Más Que Un Amigo", "Ahora Es Tarde Ya", and "Por Tí Me Casaré". The song "Lo Que Son Las Cosas" would later be covered and made famous again by the Dominican singer Anaís. Her version of the song topped the Latin Charts for 6 weeks.

== Track listing ==
No.	Title	Length
1.	"Lo Que Son las Cosas" (Luis Ángel)	4:38
2.	"Imposible" (Jud J. Friedman)	3:54
3.	"Después de Tanto" (Marco Flores)	4:07
4.	"Que No Acabe el Amor" (Luis Ángel)	4:04
5.	"Por Ti Me Casaré" (Eros Ramazzotti)	4:01
6.	"Invítame a Bailar" (Words for Two)	3:04
7.	"Ahora Es Tarde Ya" (José María Purón)	4:21
8.	"Más Que un Amigo" (Luis Ángel)	4:09
9.	"Eres Libre" (José Maria Purón)	3:53
10.	"Room Enough" (Tony Marty, Mark Spiro)	4:11
Total length:		40:22

== Personnel ==
- Ednita Nazario – lead vocals

Additional musicians

- Dean Parks – guitars
- Michael Thompson – guitars
- Bobby Huff – drums, bass guitar
- John "J.R." Robinson – drums
- Neil Stubenhaus – bass guitar
- K. C. Porter – keyboards, piano, programming, backing vocals
- Aaron Zigman – keyboards, piano, programming
- Rev. Dave Boruff – saxophone
- Luis Conte – percussion
- Alex Brown – backing vocals
- Mortonette Jenkins – backing vocals
