= El Camino del Alma =

El camino del alma

Studio album by Cristian Castro
- Released: August 15, 1994
- Recorded: 1994 (Mexico City, Mexico)
- Genre: Latin pop, latin ballad, bolero, pop rock, latin rock, hard rock
- Length: 45:00
- Label: Fonovisa
- Producer: Alejandro Zepeda

Cristian Castro chronology
Un Segundo en el Tiempo (1993)	El camino del alma (1994)	El Deseo de Oír Tu Voz (1996)

Singles from El Camino del Alma
- 1. "Mañana" Released: June 1994; 2. "Con Tu Amor" Released: July 1994; 3. "Azul Gris" Released: January 1995

El camino del alma (The path of the soul) is the third studio album released by Mexican Latin pop singer Cristian Castro. It was released on August 15, 1994. Its major hit was the cover Juan Gabriel's "Mañana, Mañana". The album was nominated in 1996 for Best Latin Pop Album in the Grammy Awards and a Lo Nuestro Award for Pop Album of the Year.

== Track listing ==
1. "Mañana" - 04:13
2. "Con Tu Amor" - 03:56
3. "Estás Mintiendo" - 04:00
4. "Azul Gris" - 03:30
5. "Piel y Seda" - 05:08
6. "Con Esa Morena" - 03:57
7. "Yo Sigo Aquí" - 04:10
8. "Tú Me Llenas" - 04:54
9. "Mi Querido Amor (My Cherie Amour)" - 04:30
10. "No Te Vayas" - 03:18
11. "Azul Gris" (Instrumental) - 03:30
12. "Morelía" - 04:35

== Charts ==
Chart (1994)	Peak position
Puerto Rican Albums (UPI)	6
US Top Latin Albums (Billboard)	5
US Latin Pop Albums (Billboard)	3
