= Pasiones (album) =

Studio album by Ednita Nazario
- Released: July 26, 1994
- Genre: Latin pop
- Label: EMI Latin
- Producer: Ednita Nazario; K. C. Porter

Ednita Nazario chronology
Live (1994)	Pasiones (1994)	Espíritu Libre (1996)

Pasiones (Passions) is the 14th album and 13th studio album by Puerto Rican singer Ednita Nazario. It was released on July 26, 1994. Two songs from the album, "Quiero Que Me Hagas el Amor" and "Gata Sin Luna", became a number one hit on the Billboard Latin Pop Airplay chart.

== Track listing ==
1. "Gata Sin Luna" - 4:27 (Luis Ángel Márquez)
2. "Dime Tú" - 4:09 (Sharon Riley, Jonathan Dwayne)
3. "Un Beso" - 4:05 (Jonathan Dwayne)
4. "Como Antes" - 4:15 (Luis Ángel Márquez)
5. "Te Sigo Esperando" - 4:12 (Marco Flores)
6. "Contra el Pasado" - 3:49 (K. C. Porter, Jonathan Dwayne)
7. "Quiero Que Me Hagas el Amor" - 4:26 (Luis Ángel Márquez)
8. "No Voy a Llorar" - 3:35 (Ednita Nazario)
9. "Evolución" - 3:44 (K. C. Porter, Jonathan Dwayne)
10. "Entre la Puerta y el Reloj" - 4:34 (Marco Flores)
11. "No Puedo Olvidarte" - 4:32 (Jonathan Dwayne)

== Singles ==
1. "Quiero Que Me Hagas el Amor"
2. "Te Sigo Esperando"
3. "Como Antes"
4. "Dime Tú"
5. "Gata Sin Luna"
6. "No Puedo Olvidarte"

== Personnel ==
- Produced by Ednita Nazario and K. C. Porter

== Charts ==
Weekly chart performance for Pasiones
Chart (1994)	Peak position
Puerto Rican Albums (UPI)	4
