= Acústico (Ednita Nazario album) =

Live album by Ednita Nazario
- Released: July 30, 2002
- Genre: Latin pop
- Label: Sony Discos
- Producer: Ednita Nazario

Ednita Nazario chronology
Sin Límite (2001)	Acústico (2002)	Acústico Vol. II (2002)

Alternative cover
- DVD album cover

Professional ratings
Review scores
Source	Rating
AllMusic	3/5 stars

Acústico (Acoustic) is the 18th album and second live album of Puerto Rican singer Ednita Nazario. It is the first of two albums recorded during a special concert at the Luis A. Ferré Performing Arts Center in San Juan, Puerto Rico.

The album is the reality of a unique project by Nazario where she turned the Arts Center into a recording studio and invited 300 friends to share the evening with her.

The album includes special appearances by Puerto Rican singer/producer Tommy Torres, who would become Ednita's producer for her next few albums, and singer Jorge Laboy.

The album was certified platinum by the RIAA.

== Track listing ==
1. "Eres Libre"
2. "Tú Sin Mí"
3. "Tú Sabes Bien"
4. "Ahora Es Tarde Ya"
5. "Hielo Bajo el Sol" (with Tommy Torres)
6. "Medley"
  - "El Dolor de Tu Presencia"
  - "Un Corazón Hecho Pedazos"
7. "Lloviendo Flores"
8. "Más Grande Que Grande"
9. "Medley"
  - "Por Ti Me Casaré"
  - "Mi Pequeño Amor" (with Jorge Laboy)
10. "No Voy a Llorar"
11. "Tanto Que Te Di"
12. "No Me Mires Así"

== Awards ==
=== Billboard Latin Music Awards ===
Year	Award	Result
2003	Latin Pop Album of the Year, Female	Nominated

=== Latin Grammy Awards ===
Year	Award	Result
2003	Latin Grammy Awards	Nominated

== Personnel ==
- Produced by Ednita Nazario

== Certifications ==
Region	Certification	Certified units/sales
United States (RIAA)	Platinum (Latin)	100,000^{^}
^{^} Shipments figures based on certification alone.
