= Por Ti (album) =

Studio album by Ednita Nazario
- Released: November 18, 2003
- Genre: Latin pop
- Length: 40:28
- Label: Sony Discos
- Producers: Ednita Nazario; Tommy Torres

Ednita Nazario chronology
Acústico Vol. II (2002)	Por Ti (2003)	Apasionada (2005)

Por Ti (For You) is the 20th album and 17th studio album by Puerto Rican singer Ednita Nazario, released on November 18, 2003, by Sony Music. The album was certified Disco de Oro (Gold) by the RIAA on January 14, 2004, for selling over 100,000 in the states. It was later certified Disco Platinum (Platinum) for selling over 200,000.

== Track listing ==
1. "Por Ti" (You Made Me Find Myself) – 3:45
2. "A Que No Te Vas" – 3:56
3. "Si No Me Amas" – 4:09
4. "Cansada de Estar Cansada" – 3:17
5. "Más Mala Que Tú" – 4:34
6. "Ahora" – 4:07
7. "Cúrame" – 3:56
8. "Química Ideal" – 4:12
9. "Te Quedarás Hundido" – 4:23
10. "El Privilegio de Dar" – 4:11

== Singles ==
1. "Si No Me Amas"
2. "A Que No Te Vas"
3. "Más Mala Que Tu"

== Personnel ==
- Produced by Ednita Nazario and Tommy Torres

== Awards ==
=== Billboard Latin Music Awards ===
Year	Award	Result
2004	Latin Pop Album of the Year, Female	Won

== Chart performance ==
Chart (2003)	Peak position
United States Billboard Top Latin Albums	1
US Billboard Latin Pop Albums	1
US Billboard Top Heatseekers	1
US Billboard 200	116

== Sales and certifications ==
Region	Certification	Certified units/sales
United States (RIAA)	Platinum (Latin)	100,000^{^}
^{^} Shipments figures based on certification alone.
