= Corazón (Ednita Nazario album) =

Studio album by Ednita Nazario
- Released: March 23, 1999
- Genre: Latin pop
- Label: EMI Latin
- Producer: Ednita Nazario; Robi Draco Rosa

Ednita Nazario chronology
Espíritu Libre (1996)	Corazón (1999)	Sin Límite (2001)

Corazón (Heart) is the 16th album and 15th studio album of Puerto Rican singer Ednita Nazario. It was released on March 23, 1999.

It received a rating of three stars from AllMusic, which noted, "Corazon wears its heart on its sleeve, with gently Latin-inflected pop ballads like 'Viene y Va,' 'Yo Pienso en Ti,' and the title track setting the tone for the album."

== Track listing ==
1. "¿Quién Te Robó el Corazón?"
2. "Pienso en Ti"
3. "Corazón de Cristal y Algodón"
4. "No Me Digas Adiós"
5. "Más Grande Que Grande"
6. "Perdiendo Tu Amor"
7. "Corazón"
8. "Di Tantas Veces"
9. "Viene y Va"
10. "Tú Sabes Bien"

== Singles ==
1. "Más Grande Que Grande"
2. "Pienso en Ti"
3. "¿Quién Te Robó el Corazón?"
4. "Tú Sabes Bien"

== Personnel ==
- Produced by Ednita Nazario and Robi Draco Rosa
