= Tú Sin Mí =

Studio album by Ednita Nazario
- Released: 1986
- Genre: Latin pop
- Label: Melody International
- Producer: Rudy Pérez

Ednita Nazario chronology
Al Rojo Vivo (1983)	Tú Sin Mí (1986)	Fuerza De Gravedad (1989)

Tú Sin Mí (You Without Me) is the ninth studio album of Puerto Rican singer Ednita Nazario. The album was released in 1986.

== Track listing ==
The full track listing includes:

1. "Que Me Ame Más"
2. "Más Que Nunca, Hoy"
3. "El Dolor de Tu Presencia"
4. "Te Amaría"
5. "Tú Sin Mí"
6. "Alma de Gitana"
7. "No Hay Nadie"
8. "Tema para una Voz Triste y un Piano"
9. "Está Herido Mi Amor"
10. "Te Borraré"

== Singles ==
1. "Tú Sin Mí"
2. "Alma de Gitana"
3. "El Dolor de Tu Presencia"
4. "Que Me Ame Más"

== Personnel ==
- Produced by Rudy Peréz
