= Frankie Sabath =

Puerto Rican musician

Frankie Sabath (born 1951 in Ponce, Puerto Rico) is a Puerto Rican entertainer.

== Biography ==
Sabath began his career as an entertainer in the 1960s, aged 16, performing with Puerto Rican singing group The Kids From Ponce. The group disbanded after three years, and three of its members continued as soloists: Jose Manuel, Ednita Nazario, and Sabath.

Sabath made numerous TV appearances and released two hit singles: "Se Te Hizo Tarde" (You're Late) and "Cuando Me Pidas Perdon" (When You Ask For Forgiveness). He moved to the United States and made his American debut in 1985, performing at the request of his friend Ernesto Tarre for the Hispanic-American "Queen of the Flowers" pageant in Milwaukee, Wisconsin. In 1986, Sabath founded The Milwaukee Sound, including local musicians, some from the Wisconsin Conservatory of Music, and the musician and conductor Carol Klose.

Sabath headlined at Fiesta Mexicana in 1986 with Johnny Rodriguez and in 1987 with Freddy Fender. He also appeared at the Rainbow Summer festival sponsored by the Milwaukee Journal and held at the Performing Arts Center. He made his acting debut in Studs Terkel's musical Working.

In 1988, while Sabath was promoting the release of his first record in the U.S., his father died, leading him to take two years off entertainment work. In 1991, he was profiled for an article about his career and comeback in the Milwaukee Sentinel but his mother, now living in Milwaukee, also died unexpectedly. It was another fifteen years before he accepted an invitation to perform at a concert, accompanied by a hand-picked orchestra under the direction of Sergio Poventud at Milwaukee's United Community Center for Latino Arts.

Sabath headlined Fiesta Boricua each year from 2004 to 2007, alongside Alex D'Castro and Wichy Camacho in 2004, La India in 2005, Olga Tañon in 2006, and Gilberto Santa Rosa in 2007.

In 2010, Sabath had the lead in Isla y Tierra, a play written and produced by Christine Almeida, author, entertainer, and entrepreneur, and directed by David M. Molthen, professor emeritus of theater at Carroll college. The comedy musical was performed at the Waukesha Civic Theatre and was the first Latino production in the history of the theater.
