= Claudio Bermúdez =

Mexican musician

- Born: Claudio Bermúdez Cassani; December 31, 1971 (age 54); Mexico City
- Occupations: Singer; songwriter
- Years active: 1989–present
- Formerly of: Timbiriche

Claudio Bermúdez Cassani (born 31 December 1971) is a Mexican songwriter, musician, songwriter, producer, arranger, engineer and actor. He achieve early success from 1989 to 1991 as part of the pop group Timbiriche. In 1994, he launched a solo career, releasing his third album in 2010. Bermúdez has also written songs for a number of other artists. In 1995, he won Best New Artist award at the Eres Awards. He also received the ASCAP Award for his song "Ven Junto a Mí".

== Early life ==
Bermúdez was born on 31 December 1971 in Mexico City, the son of concert pianist José Luis Bermúdez. He began studying the piano with his father at age 7 and started his acting career at 12. His first experience as a singer was at 16 years old, singing mariachi.

== Career ==
=== Timbriche ===
In 1989, Bermúdez joined Mexican pop music group Timbiriche, along with Silvia Campos, Diego Schoening, Paulina Rubio, Erik Rubín, Edith Márquez, Bibi Gaytán, and Patty Tanús. In 1990, they recorded the album "Timbiriche X", which was a big success. The band won multiple gold and platinum discs and had a long two-year tour in Mexico.

In 1991, Timbiriche celebrated their 10 anniversary as a band in "La Movida", a late-night TV show hosted by Verónica Castro. The same year, Bermúdez was dropped by the band.

=== Solo career ===
In 1994, Bermúdez made a solo comeback with the release "Como aire fresco", produced by Rafael Pérez Botija. With 10 songs as a songwriter, which earned a gold record for 100,000 sold copies. He reached the peak of popularity in Latin America and with his songs "Here with Me" and "You are My Refuge" achieving billboard success.

In 1995, Bermúdez won Best New Artist at the Eres Awards. In the US, he received the ASCAP Award for the song "Ven Junto a Mí".

In 2001, Bermudez wrote a religious album "Estoy contigo". In 2006, Claudio produced the theme song for the movie "Open Season", which was performed by Reyli Barba. In 2007, he participated in programme "Disco de Oro”. In 2010, Claudio wrote, arrange and produced his third album "Vida". The album included the hit song, "Por qué no llamas?" (Why don't you call?).

Bermúdez has also written songs for other artists such as Paulina Rubio, Edith Márquez, Carlos Rivera, Cuisillos, Ragazzi.

== Discography ==
=== Timbiriche ===
- Timbiriche 10 (1990)

=== Solo artist ===
- Como aire fresco (1994)
- Estoy contigo (2001)
- Vida (2012)

== TV appearances ==
- Disco de Oro (2007) Participó como concursante.
