= Sin Querer =

Single by Ednita Nazario

from the album Soy
- Released: August 17, 2009
- Recorded: 2008–2009
- Genre: Latin pop
- Length: 3:48
- Label: Sony Music Latin
- Songwriters: Rafael López, Samo
- Producer: Sebastián Krys

Ednita Nazario singles chronology
"'Todavia" (2009)	"Sin Querer" (2009)	"Confesados" (2010)

"Sin Querer" (By Accident) is the first single off Ednita Nazario's album Soy, produced by Sebastian Krys. "Sin Querer" (Without wanting to) was officially released on radio stations and via Ednita's official MySpace page on Thursday, August 13, 2009. It was released on August 17 on iTunes.

== Music video ==
On September 2, 2009 Ednita posted a 30-second clip of the first single titled "Sin Querer", which was received by positive reviews. As a special gift for her fans, she broadcast the cover photo shoot live via internet on September 3, 2009 as well as the video shoot for her first single on September 19, 2009.

== Charts ==
Chart (2009)	Peak position
Billboard Latin Songs	30
Billboard Latin Pop Songs	12
