= Angelo Medina =

Puerto Rican music executive

Ángelo Medina (born April 21, 1956, Aguadilla, Puerto Rico) is an international music executive.

Though his given name is Ángel, he was in youth dubbed "Ángelo", given it was his father's art name as a radio presenter. He obtained a B.A. in Labour-Management Relations from the University of Puerto Rico, Rio Piedras He is the former manager of Ricky Martin and is the actual manager of Latin Rock giants Maná, Romeo Santos, Draco Rosa, and other well-known Latin artists. President of Empresas Angelo Medina, he has for more than four decades presided over the careers of multiple artists to achieve sweeping commercial success, earning credit as a historically important contributor to the Latin music business Additionally, he is involved in sports promoting (basketball, baseball, and boxing). He owned the Cangrejeros de Santurce (basketball) franchise and also, until its cessation, owned the television sports network Deportes 13.
