= Acústico Vol. II =

Acústico, Vol. II

Live album by Ednita Nazario
- Released: November 22, 2002
- Genre: Latin pop
- Label: Sony Discos
- Producer: Ednita Nazario

Ednita Nazario chronology
Acústico (2002)	Acústico, Vol. II (2002)	Por Tí (2003)

Professional ratings
Review scores
Source	Rating
AllMusic	3/5 stars

Acústico, Vol. II is the 19th album and third live album of Puerto Rican singer Ednita Nazario. Is the second of two albums recorded during a special presentation of her at the Luis A. Ferré Performing Arts Center in San Juan, Puerto Rico.

The album is the realization of a unique project of Nazario where she turned the Arts Center into a recording studio, inviting 300 friends to share with her that night.

The album includes special appearances by singer Jorge Laboy.

The album was released in 2002.

== Track listing ==
1. "Espíritu Libre"
2. "Quiero Que Me Hagas el Amor"
3. "Te Sigo Esperando"
4. "Medley"
  - "La Prohibida"
  - "A Que No Le Cuentas"
5. "Lo Mejor de Ti"
6. "Tres Deseos"
7. "Devuélveme"
8. "Lo Que Son las Cosas"
9. "Medley"
  - "Como Antes"
  - "Contigo, Mi Amor" (with Jorge Laboy)
  - "Mi Corazón Tiene Mente Propia"
10. "Aprenderé"
11. "Fruto de Tu Boca"

== Awards ==
=== Billboard Latin Music Awards ===
Year	Award	Result
2003	Latin Pop Album of the Year, Female	Nominated

== Personnel ==
- Produced by Ednita Nazario
