= No Te Mentía =

2007 single by Ednita Nazario

"No te Mentía"

Single by Ednita Nazario

from the album Real
- Released: October 15, 2007
- Recorded: 2007
- Studio: Ike's Garage; Sonic Project Studio; The Tiki Room (Miami, FL)
- Genre: Latin pop; rock; latin ballad
- Length: 3:40
- Label: Sony BMG Norte
- Songwriter(s): Claudia Brant · Jorge Luis Piloto
- Producer(s): Greame Pleeth

Ednita Nazario singles chronology
"Te He Querido, Te He Llorado" (2006)	"No te Mentía" (2007)	"Después de Tí" (2008)

"No te Mentía" (English: I Was Not Lying) is song written by Claudia Brant and co-written by Jorge Luis Piloto, produced by Greame Pleeth and performed by Puerto Rican-American singer-songwriter Ednita Nazario, taken from his 23rd studio album Real (2007). The song was released as the lead single from the album's on October 15, 2007 by Sony BMG Norte. This song deals with a warning from one woman to her beloved, whom she did not will endure "no more".

== Music video ==
The music video was recorded in Argentina in November 2007. The worldwide premiere was in "No te Duermas" TV show of Telemundo.

No Te Mentia - Official Music Video

== Charts ==
Year	Chart	Position
2007	Billboard Hot Latin Tracks	16
2007	Billboard Latin Pop Airplay	5
2008	Billboard Latin Tropical Airplay	11
