= Ednita Nazario =

Puerto Rican singer (born 1955)

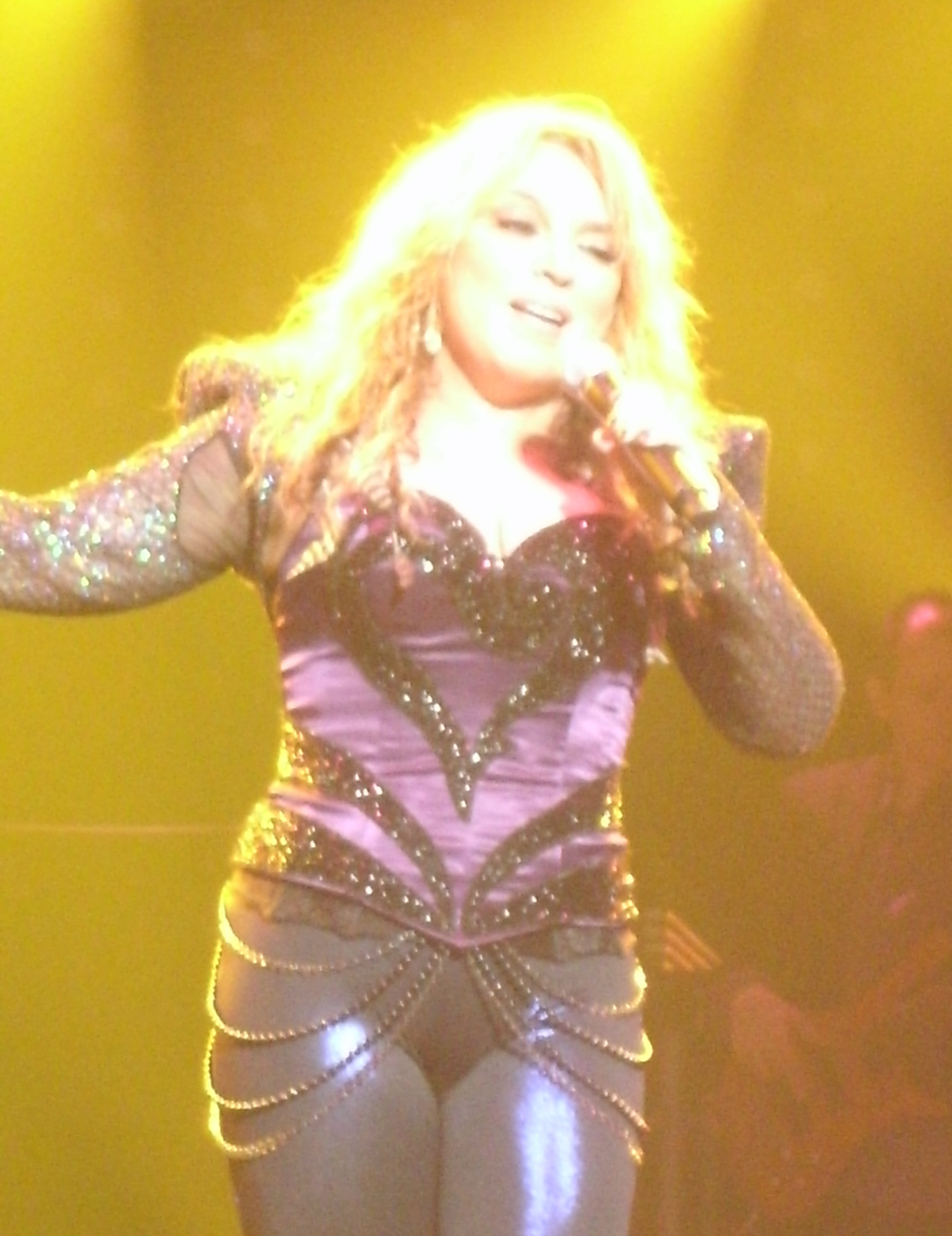
- Nazario performing in 2010

Background information
- Also known as: La Diva Ponceña
- Born: April 11, 1955 (age 71); Ponce, Puerto Rico
- Genres: Latin pop; Latin ballad; Latin rock
- Occupation: Singer
- Years active: 1961–present
- Labels: Sony Latin (2009–present); Sony BMG (2006–2009); Sony Discos (2001–2005); EMI Latin (1991–1999); Capitol (1991); Fonovisa (1989); Melody International (1986); Padosa (1982–1983); Pronto (1979); Borinquen (1976–1978); Mardi Grass (1973)
- Website: ednita.com

Edna María Nazario Figueroa (born April 11, 1955) is a Puerto Rican Latin pop singer who has achieved stardom both at home and abroad. She has been in the music business from a young age and has released twenty-four studio albums, seven live albums and two extended plays (EPs) throughout her career.

== Biography ==
=== Childhood sensation ===
Nazario was born in Ponce, Puerto Rico, to Domingo Nazario and Gudelia Figueroa. She has two older brothers (Tito and Alberto) and a younger brother (Frank, a.k.a. Pancho). Ednita showed inclinations to music even when small. A family anecdote tells that when she was 2 and shopping with her mother, she wandered away, and her mother found her singing on top of boxes to an enthusiastic crowd of laughing, clapping shoppers.

When she was six, she attended a baseball game in Ponce with her brothers. While she was playing with her brother's glove, the batter hit the ball toward her. She held the glove up for protection, and the ball landed squarely in it. The crowd went wild, including Alfred D. Herger, one of Puerto Rico's top record producers, who was seated near the family. When he asked her if she wanted to be a baseball player, she replied "No, I'm going to be a singer." He asked her to sing something for him, and she responded with an impressive rendition of a local salsa hit that left both the producer and the applauding crowd astonished. Two months later, Herger visited the Nazario household with a recording contract. After initial reluctance, the family signed the contract.

At 6, Ednita recorded her first song: "Mi Amor Lolipop," a Spanish version of "My Boy Lollipop". In 1966, at age 11, Nazario made her radio debut.

=== Teen success ===
After some presentations, Nazario started alongside singer and photographer José Manuel, and Frankie Sabath, in a band which Tony Morales created, called The Kids From Ponce. The group played at several hotels and television networks, and achieved local success, appearing on various TV shows. However, the group disbanded and they became soloists. Nazario, then 17, was offered her own prime-time TV variety show: El Show de Ednita, broadcast by Telemundo Puerto Rico, and produced by Paquito Cordero. During this time she also won the "Miss Puerto Rico Teenage pageant".

At age 18 in 1973, Nazario released her first album called Al Fin...Ednita. The album spawned a number 1 Hit: Te Quiero y No Me Importa (I Love You And I Don't Care), and also brought her award as "New Artist of the Year". With her TV show, Nazario became Puerto Rico's hottest idol. The show was also syndicated to other Latin-American countries. Among the international stars that she hosted were: Liza Minnelli, Bob Eberly, Charles Aznavour, Morey Amsterdam and Oscar-winning Puerto Rican actor José Ferrer. Ferrer was so charmed by Nazario's presence that he designed a nightclub act for both of them.

Ferrer was surprised at the reception of Nazario's show. They were booked at several hotels in the Caribbean, Lake Tahoe, Las Vegas and New York. They appeared at the Hyatt Hotel in Canada, and she was invited by Monaco's Royal Family to perform at the famous casino of Monte Carlo three times.

=== Rising star ===
In the late 1970s Nazario participated in the eight edition of the OTI Festival as a singer with the song "Cadenas de Fuego" (Fire chains) getting a more than respectable fifth place with 21 points, and in 1980 as a songwriter with the song: Contigo, Mujer (With you, Woman), co-written by her husband at the time, Laureano Brizuela, an Argentine singer and songwriter. The latter song, performed by Rafael José, won top prize of the festival scoring 36 points. She also gained notoriety for her performance in a duet with Brizuela, of the theme song of the successful Puerto Rican telenovela, Coralito:Mi Pequeño Amor (Coralito:My Little Love), which Brizuela had written. During the late 1970's, Nazario participated in a musical collaboration with boy band Menudo, in which she and the group sang a cover of ABBA's song "Chiquitita", with Nazario playing the titular "Chiquitita" in a music video she and the band recorded.

During this time Nazario signed subsequent record deals, first with local label Borinquen, then Ariola, and finally Padosa. During this time, she matured her style to one that was more pop/rock oriented. She also cemented her place as a touring force in Latin-America.

=== In the 1990s ===
In 1989 Nazario released Fuerza De Gravedad (Force of Gravity). Perhaps helped by her recent marriage and motherhood, the album showed more focused lyrics and a more mature singer. The album included a duet with Air Supply singer Russell Hitchcock. Her following album "Lo Que Son Las Cosas" (What A Way For Things To Be) in 1991 included a Spanish version of a song made famous by Italian singer Eros Ramazzotti. The album also contained other compositions from her Argentinian ex-husband Luis Angel.

After her breakup from her husband, Nazario refocused her career and released Metamorfosis in 1992, following it with presentations in some of the most prestigious halls of the island. In 1993 she sold out a concert at the Roberto Clemente Coliseum which was released as an album the following year. After another album, she starred an impressive run of 13 shows at the Luis A. Ferré Performing Arts Center of San Juan, following Yolandita Monge's record of 12 consecutive shows.

In 1994 she released one of her most acclaimed albums to date: Pasiones (Passions).

In 1996 she released Espíritu Libre (Free Spirit), which went triple platinum soon after being released. On the heels of it, she sold out the Hiram Bithorn Stadium on a show that was broadcast via Internet.

In 1998 she was cast for the lead role in Paul Simon's Broadway musical, The Capeman, sharing the stage with Rubén Blades and Marc Anthony. She won the Theatre World Award for her performance as "Esmeralda Agrón". She was nominated for a 1998 Drama Desk Award as Outstanding Featured Actress in a Musical.

=== 1999–2012 ===
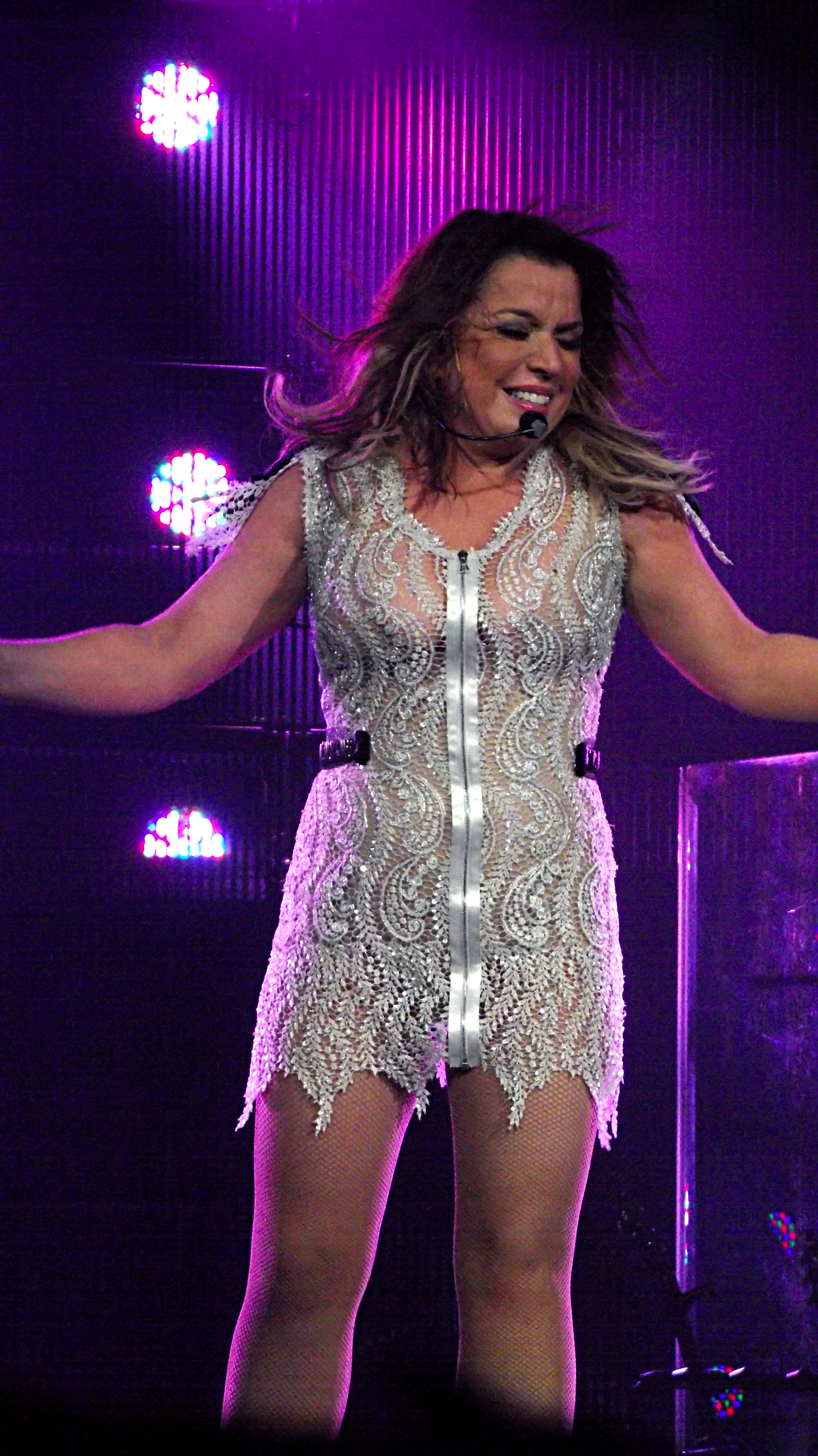
Nazario in 2012

In 1999 Nazario resurged in music, with Corazón (Sweetheart). The album, produced and directed by Dräco Rosa, went platinum in just a week. The album also got her several awards and two Billboard nominations. In 2001, after signing a new record deal with Sony Music, she released Sin Límite (Limitless), which featured fellow singer and songwriter Tommy Torres as producer.

In 2002 she fulfilled one of her dreams by transforming the Luis A. Ferré Performing Arts Center into a recording studio and inviting 300 friends to share with her two nights of an acoustic concert. The concert was released in two separate albums: Acústico I & II (Unplugged Vol 1 & 2). The presentation included a duo with Beto Cuevas, lead singer of the Latin-American band La Ley.

Next year, with Tommy Torres again producing, Nazario released Por Tí (Because of You). The album featured collaborations with Ricky Martin and Luis Fonsi. The supporting concert broke all attendance records in Puerto Rico. She followed with Apasionada (Passionate), also produced by Torres. This included collaborations with composer Claudia Brandt, Sin Bandera's Noel Schajris, and Luis Fonsi.

In December 2007 Nazario released her album "Real" produced by producer Armando Avila (La 5ª Estación) and Graeme Pleeth (Sonique). The album was recorded in London, Nashville, Mexico City and Miami, and debuted at number 1 in Billboard's Top Latin Albums and Top Latin Pop Albums, selling over 18,000 copies the first week. On July 2, 2008, Nazario filmed a music video for "No" along Natalia Jiménez of La 5ª Estación. Nazario was one of several artists selected to perform in "KQ Live Concert" on September 27, 2008. Organized by KQ 105 FM, the event included several artists from Puerto Rico and other Latin American countries.

Nazario's new album "Soy" (I Am) was released on October 27, 2009. Nazario has worked with Tommy Torres, Sebastian Krys and Claudia Brant.On September 2 Nazario posted a 30-second clip of the first single titled "Sin Querer" (Without wanting to), which received positive reviews.

"Sin Querer" (Without wanting to) was released on radio stations and via Nazario's MySpace page on September 24, 2009. It was released on October 6 on iTunes. Three more singles were released from this album. "Confesados" (Confessed) was the second single and was released January 11, 2010. "La Fuerza De Un Te Quiero" (The Strength of an I Love You), the third single, was released April 5, 2010. The last single of the album, "Se Que Voy A Reir" (I Know I Will Laugh) was released July 19, of that same year.

On January 16, 2012, Ednita released her lead single "Para El Peor Amante" (For The Worst Lover), for her 22nd album was released. Her 22nd album, titled Desnuda (Naked) was released March 27 of that year. From this album, the songs "Voy" (Going), La Pasion Tiene Memoria" (The Passion Has A Memory), and "Alergica Al Amor" (Alergic To Love) were released as singles following the album's released. Ednita did a set of concerts in Coliseo Jose Miguel Agrelot where her daughter, Caro Lina, made her first musical appearance. Caro Lina debuted her single "Dangerous" through online digital market months later.

=== 2013–2017: El Corazón Decide and Una Vida ===
On October 22 of 2013, Ednita released her 23rd album, titled "El Corazón Decide" (The Heart Decides). The album was recorded in Miami and London; and contains songs from international artists like Pedro Capó, Leonel García and Kany Garcia, who composed the first single from the album "La Más Fuerte" (The Stronger One). The album follows the same musical and lyrical formula of her last previous recordings. Nazario released 4 more singles from El Corazon Decide. "A Mi No" (Not Me) was released January 10 of 2014. That same year she released the third and fourth single of the album. She released "Llorar Por Ti" (Cry For You) and "Asi Es La Vida Sin Ti" (That's Life Without You) on April 24 and September 24 respectably. "Empezar a Vivir" (Starting to Live) was the fifth and last single of the album and was released on January 14, 2015.

In October 2015, Ednita released her new single "Eras Uno Mas" ([You] Were Just One More) became the lead single for her 24th studio album, titled "Una Vida" (One Life). Later, on January 22, 2016, Nazario released the song "Ya no me duele tanto" (It Doesn't Hurt Me That Much Now) as the second single. The third single of the album titled "Ni una lágrima(Bandolero)" was released on April 7, 2017. The album "Una Vida" was released on April 28, 2017.

That year (2017), Ednita released her first autobiography, also titled Una Vida. The autobiographical book was released on the 25 of April.

On July 21, 2017, "Adiós" was released as the fourth single of the album "Una Vida".

== Honors ==
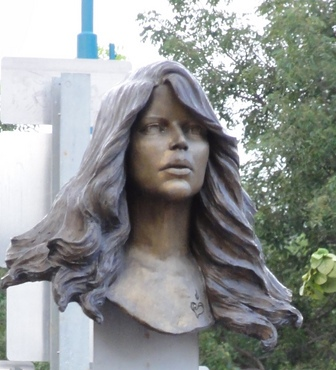
Bust of Ednita Nazario in Barrio San Anton in Ponce, Puerto Rico

- Her album Por Ti was nominated for "Latin Grammy" award in the category "Best Album – Female Pop Vocal"; it was also nominated for "Tu Música" award in the category Best Album – Pop/Ballad
- ASCAP gives Nazario the "Latin Heritage Award" (2004).
- NARAS Recording Academy Honors (2005)
- Nominated in the 2008 "Billboard Latin Music Awards" in the category "Album of the Year -Female Latin Pop"; also nominated (2008) for "Latin Grammy" award in the category "Best Album – Female Latin Pop"
- Nominated in a new category, "Top Album of the Year – Latin Female" in the "Billboard Latin Music Awards" (2009)
- Latin Grammy Lifetime Achievement Award (2016)
- Latin Songwriters Hall of Fame La Musa Elena Casals Award (2017)

== Accolades ==
On October 2, 2008, a road in Ponce was renamed in her honor. Avenida La Ceiba, a state road, was renamed Avenida Ednita Nazario.

== Discography ==
See Ednita Nazario Discography

External audio
- You may listen to Ednita Nazario's interpretation on YouTube of Pedro Flores' "Perdón" in duo with Marc Anthony

Studio albums

- 1973: Al Fin... Ednita
- 1976: Me Está Gustando
- 1976: Nueva Navidad
- 1977: Vete Vete...
- 1978: Mujer Sola
- 1979: Retrato De Mujer
- 1982: Ednita
- 1983: Al Rojo Vivo
- 1986: Tú Sin Mí
- 1989: Fuerza De Gravedad
- 1991: Lo Que Son Las Cosas
- 1992: Metamorfosis
- 1994: Live
- 1994: Pasiones
- 1996: Espíritu Libre
- 1999: Corazón
- 2001: Sin Límite
- 2002: Acústico
- 2002: Acústico Vol. II
- 2003: Por Tí
- 2005: Apasionada
- 2006: Apasionada Live
- 2007: Real
- 2008: Real... En Vivo
- 2009: Soy
- 2012: Desnuda
- 2013: El Corazón Decide
- 2017: Una Vida
- 2020: La Más Loca (EP)
- 2021: La Más Bella (EP)
- 2025: En Directo Vol. I
- 2025: En Directo Vol. II
- 2026: FuegoAlmaVida

Compilations

- 1990: Súper éxitos originales
- 1991: Súper éxitos
- 1993: Dos reinas del Caribe: Ángela Carrasco y Ednita Nazario
- 1995: Éxitos del recuerdo
- 1995: Éxitos y recuerdos
- 1997: Por siempre Ednita
- 1998: Ednita Nazario
- 1999: Mis mejores momentos
- 2000: Mas Grande Que Grande: 16 Exitos
- 2001: Sólo Lo Mejor: 20 Exitos
- 2001: Perfiles
- 2002: Edicion Limitada
- 2003: 30 Exitos Insuperables
- 2005: Ednita y Sus Exitos
- 2006: 30 Del Recuerdo
- 2007: Serie 3x4
- 2007: Coleccion Suprema
- 2008: Los Romanticos
- 2008: Celebridades (CD + DVD)
- 2008: 12 Boleros Coleccion de Oro
- 2008: Navidad, Lo Mejor de Ednita Nazario
- 2008: Tradiciones Navideñas
- 2010: La Diva
- 2011: Encuentro de Divas

DVDs

- 1994: "Ednita Nazario... Live"
- 2004: "Viva La Diva"
- 2004: "Acústico"
- 2006: "Apasionada Live"
- 2008: "Real... En Vivo"
- 2010: "Historia de Ednita Nazario: La Diva"

== Concert tours ==
- 2010–2012: Soy... El Concierto
- 2012–2013: Desnuda El Concierto
- 2014: La Más Fuerte Tour
- 2016: Intensamente Ednita Tour
- 2017–2018: Una Vida Tour
- 2021–2023: La Más Loca, La Más Bella Tour
- 2023–2024: La Reina World Tour
- 2025: Amor/Desamor
- 2027: FuegoAlmaVida Tour
