= Tommy Torres =

Puerto Rican singer

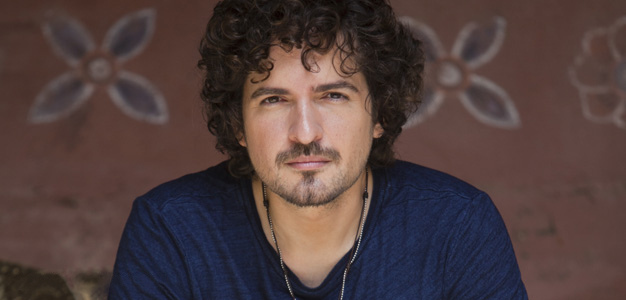
- Torres on Acceso Total

Background information
- Born: Tomás Torres Carrasquillo; November 25, 1971 (age 54); San Juan, Puerto Rico
- Genre: Latin pop
- Occupations: Singer; songwriter; record producer
- Years active: 1999–present
- Labels: Warner Latina; Rimas
- Website: tommytorres.com

Tomás Torres Carrasquillo (Spanish pronunciation: [ˈtomas ˈtores karasˈkiʝo]; born November 25, 1971), known professionally as Tommy Torres (Spanish pronunciation: [ˈtomi ˈtores]), is a Puerto Rican singer, songwriter, and record producer. Named "#1 Hot Latin Tracks Producer" of 2007 by Billboard magazine and Composer of the Year at 2010 ASCAP's Latin Music Awards, Torres has written and produced songs for many artists including Ricardo Arjona, Jesse & Joy, Ednita Nazario, Alejandro Sanz, Ricky Martin and Alicia Keys.

== Early life ==
Born in the Santurce district of San Juan, Puerto Rico, Torres learned to play the violin and keyboards at a young age. He started composing when he was in high school. He then enrolled in Berklee College of Music where he graduated magna cum laude with a dual major of "Music Production & Engineering"and "Commercial Arranging". Torres lived in New York City for a while working as a studio assistant at the famed Sony Music Studios and later moved to Miami, Florida in 1998.

== Musical career ==
=== Writer and producer ===
His first recorded composition was "No Puedo Olvidar" by pop group MDO in 1999. The song made it to No. 1 on the Billboard Hot Latin Tracks chart. That same year, another one of his compositions, "Llegar A Ti" was recorded by Christian artist Jaci Velasquez and quickly climbed to the No. 1 on the Billboard Hot Latin Tracks chart, earning him an ASCAP Song of the Year award. In 2001, his production of "Cuando Seas Mia" by group Son By Four also made it to the No. 1 spot on Billboard.

His work on Acustico by Ednita Nazario as co-producer, songwriter, and featured artist, earned his first Latin Grammy Awards nomination in 2002. Later that year, he produced the critically acclaimed "Encuentro" featuring singer-songwriter's Juan Luis Guerra, Ruben Blades, and Draco Rosa. In 2003 he produced Ricky Martin's Almas del Silencio, an album that included songwriting collaborations with artists Franco de Vita, Ricardo Arjona, Alejandro Sanz, and Juanes. The album broke the Soundscan one week sales record for an all-Spanish album. The single "Tal Vez" topped the Billboard Hot Latin Tracks for 12 weeks. The song, written by Franco de Vita with musical arrangements and production by Torres, went on to win "Song of the Year" at that 2003's Latin Grammy Awards. The album also gave 3 additional No. 1 singles. Later that year Torres produced the album "Por Ti" by Ednita Nazario. Both Nazario's "Por Ti" and Martin's "Almas del Silencio" went on to win Best Pop Album Awards (Female/Male) at 2004's Billboard Latin Music Awards earning Tommy his first nomination for Producer of the Year at the Billboard Latin Music Awards.

Later on in 2004, Torres began work on Adentro by singer-songwriter Ricardo Arjona. The album was an instant hit with both critics and the public. The song "Acompañame a Estar Solo", penned by Arjona with musical arrangements and production by Torres, became No. 1 on the Billboard Magazine charts. The album "Adentro" won several awards on 2005, including Best Latin Pop Album at the Grammy Awards and Best Pop Album at the Latin Grammy Awards.

On 2006, Torres produced Ricky Martin's MTV Unplugged, which included new arrangements of early Ricky Martin hits and three new songs. The album was well received with both commercial and critical success. The song "Tu Recuerdo", penned by Torres, topped the Billboard Hot Latin Tracks for 7 weeks and maintained a top 20 spot on the chart for an astonishing 26 weeks. The song featured La Mari from flamenco-electronic group Chambao and Torres on acoustic guitar and vocal. The song "Tu Recuerdo" was nominated for Song of the Year on several awards in 2007, including the Latin Grammy Awards and Billboard Latin Music Awards, Premios MTV Latinoamerica, and winning the coveted ASCAP Pop Song of the Year Award. The album "MTV Unplugged" picked up an equal number of nominations and eventually went on to win two Latin Grammy Awards for Best Pop Album and Best Longform Video. The song "Pegate", co-written by Torres, Martin, and Roy Tavare, became a Top 10 hit on several countries in Latin America and Europe. It also won an ASCAP recognition at the ASCAP Music Awards.

A new collaboration with singer-songwriter Ricardo Arjona resulted in the song "Quien", from the album "Quien Dijo Ayer". The song was written by Arjona (lyrics) and Torres (music) reaching the top 10 of the Billboard charts. Also on the same album, Torres produced and arranged the songs "Quiero" and "Tarde (Sin Danos A Terceros)", a duet with Arjona and Spanish artist Marta Sánchez. The album "Quien Dijo Ayer", was nominated for Best Pop Album at the Billboard Latin Awards and Latin Grammy Awards. He also co-produced the song "Ya No Estamos Solos" ("Non Siamo Soli"), a duet with Eros Ramazzotti and Ricky Martin. The song became a No. 1 hit in several countries in Europe and Latin America but only reached Top20 status in the United States.

In December 2007, Billboard named Torres as the No. 1 Hot Latin Tracks producer of the year, becoming the first Puerto Rican to achieve that recognition.

On 2008, the song "Como Duele", performed by Ricardo Arjona became the No. 1 song in Mexico and U.S. Latin pop radio. Torres is credited as co-producer and arranger on the song as well as the songs "Tocando Fondo", "Sin Ti, Sin Mi", and the title track "Quinto Piso". The album received a Grammy Awards nomination for Best Latin Pop Album and a Latin Grammy Awards nomination for Best Singer-Songwriter Album. The album also became Arjona's career highest selling debut week.

A new album by Ednita Nazario titled "Soy" debuted No. 1 in Billboard Hot Latin Albums Charts and remained No. 1 for a second week in November 2009. Torres is listed as co-producer in 4 songs in the album and as composer of the song "Confesados".

Also on 2009, Tommy Torres produced the album Paraiso Express for Spanish singer-songwriter Alejandro Sanz. The first single, "Looking for Paradise", featuring R&B singer-songwriter Alicia Keys, became the No. 1 radio song in every single Latin American country with the exception of Colombia, where the No. 1 spot was held by local favorite, Carlos Vives. The song also reached the No. 1 spot in Spain and the U.S. Billboard Latin Chart. "Looking for Paradise" was co-written by Sanz, Keys, & Torres. The album "Paraiso Express" won both a Grammy Award as Latin Pop Album of the Year and a Latin Grammy Award for Pop Album of the Year. The song "Desde Cuando", written by Sanz and Torres, also earned a nomination for Song of the Year at the Latin Grammys.

In November 2012, Torres won a Latin Grammy Award for Song of the Year with the song "Corre", a song co-written with Mexican duo Jesse & Joy. Other nominees on this category included writing powerhouses Joaquin Sabina, Juan Luis Guerra, Ricardo Arjona, Juanes, and Alejandro Sanz. On his acceptance speech, Torres thanked Jesse & Joy, the fans for "making this possible", and his wife and baby "watching at home." The music video for "Corre" is now the most watched music video of a Spanish language song in YouTube, with over 130,000,000 views.

=== Solo career ===
On June 19, 2001, Torres became a solo artist with the release of a self-titled album. The album included the Billboard Top 20 singles "Como Olvidar" and "Hoy Te Vas". The album was released on the Sony Discos label and was nominated for best album by a new artist on Premios Lo Nuestro.

2004 saw the independent release of Torres' second album "Estar de Moda No Está de Moda". The album included the singles "De Rodillas", "Dame Esta Noche", Un Poquito", "Besos y Sal", "Sigo Aqui", and "Vinito Pa'l Corazon" . The first four singles were No. 1 airplay hits in his native Puerto Rico and Top 40 on the Billboard charts. "De Rodillas" reached No. 1 in several countries including Peru and Panama.

On April 1, 2008, Torres released the album "Tarde o Temprano" thru the Warner Music Latina label. The album debut No. 1 on the Puerto Rico sales charts and maintained the top spot for four consecutive weeks, according to Soundscan reports. The first five radio singles "Pegadito", "Tarde o Temprano", "Por Un Beso Tuyo", "Imparable", and "Mar Adentro" reached both the No. 1 spot in Puerto Rico radio charts, and Top 20 in US Billboard charts. The singles "Tarde o Temprano" and "Imparable" reached the Top 10 in Mexico. On September 10, 2008 "Tarde o Temprano" was nominated for a Latin Grammy Awards in the category of Best Singer-Songwriter Album. Torres performed at the Latin Grammy Awards ceremony in November 2008. On December 3, 2008, "Tarde o Temprano" was also nominated for a Grammy Awards in the Latin Pop Album of the Year field. The album was also nominated for Best Pop Album and Best Male Artist in Premios Lo Nuestro 2009. A CD/DVD version of the album titled "Tarde o Temprano - Late Edition" was released on February 10, 2009. The album features several additional acoustic versions and videos, plus the single "Imparable", now featuring Mexican brother/sister duo Jesse & Joy. On its second week of release, "Tarde o Temprano - Late Edition" hit the top spots on the sales charts in the U.S. and the No. 1 spot in Puerto Rico according to SoundScan Nielsen.

In February 2009, Tommy Torres joined Sara Bareilles, Liz Phair, and 5 other artists to be the faces of the Banana Republic spring and summer ad campaigns. The national campaigns feature print advertising, window displays and billboards identifying the artists wearing the company's clothes.

In February 2010, Tommy Torres received the Composer of the Year award at the ASCAP Latin Music Awards.

His album, "12 Historias", was released on October 2, 2012. Three singles, "Querido Tommy", "11:11", and "Mientras Tanto" have already been released. It debuted #1 on the Latin Album Charts.

After signing with Rimas Entertainment in early 2021, his newest album El Playlist de Anoche will be released on July 23, 2021, co-written and co-produced with Puerto Rican rapper Bad Bunny.

== See also ==
- List of singer-songwriters
- List of Puerto Rican songwriters
