= Billboard Latin pop charts =

The Billboard Latin pop charts began in 1985 when an album chart were introduced as Latin Pop Albums in the June 29 issue of the magazine. In October 1994, Billboard then established Latin Pop Airplay, which initially rank the most-played songs played on Latin pop radio stations before switching to a genre-based methodology in August 2020. As the music and radio industries, as well as the technology to monitor and measure sales and airplay, have evolved, Billboard currently publishes three different Latin pop charts. On April 8, 2025, Billboard debuted the Hot Latin Pop Songs chart, which ranks the best-performing Latin pop songs across streaming, digital, and airplay from all radio stations in the United States.

By "Latin pop", Billboard generally refers to the genre as Spanish-speaking pop music, including pop ballads, mid-tempo or up-tempo pop as well as "young pop sounds", "the new Spanish-language rock", pop-rhythmic and pop-dance tunes.

== History ==
=== Latin Pop Albums ===
The Latin Pop Albums chart was established on the issue dated June 29, 1985. Initially, it was published on a fortnightly basis with its positions being compiled by sales data from Latin retailers and distributors. The methodology for the chart was amended with the effect from the week of July 10, 1993, to have its sales compiled by Nielsen SoundScan, basing it on electronic point of sale data. At the same time, the chart began to be published weekly and became a sub chart of Top Latin Albums (which was established in the same week as the methodology change). Billboard also imposed a linguistic rule requiring an album to have 70% of its content in Spanish (later reduced to 50%) to be eligible to rank on the chart. On January 26, 2017, Billboard updated the Latin Pop Albums, along with the other genre album charts, to incorporate track equivalent albums (TEA) and streaming equivalent albums (SEA) to match the current Billboard 200 methodology.

The first number-one album on the Latin Pop Albums chart was Reflexiones by José José.

=== Latin Pop Airplay ===
The Latin Pop Airplay was established on October 8, 1994, as a subchart of the Latin Airplay chart. It ranked the top-performing songs played on Latin pop radio stations in the US based on weekly airplay data compiled by Nielsen's Broadcast Data Systems (BDS). With the issue dated August 15, 2020, Billboard revamped the chart to reflect overall airplay of Latin pop music on Latin radio stations. Instead of ranking songs being played on Latin-pop stations, rankings are determined by the amount of airplay Latin-pop songs receive on stations that play Latin music regardless of genre.

The first number-one song on the Latin Pop Airplay chart was "Mañana" by Cristian Castro.

=== Hot Latin Pop Songs ===
On the issue dated April 12, 2025, Billboard established Hot Latin Pop Songs which ranks the best-performing Latin pop songs which follows the methodology of the Billboard Hot 100 by incorporating digital download sales, streaming data, and radio airplay of Latin pop songs over all formats. The first number-one song on the Hot Latin Pop Songs chart was "Ojos Tristes" by Selena Gomez, Benny Blanco, and The Marías.
