= Manu Koch =

Swiss pianist, keyboardist and composer (born 1972)

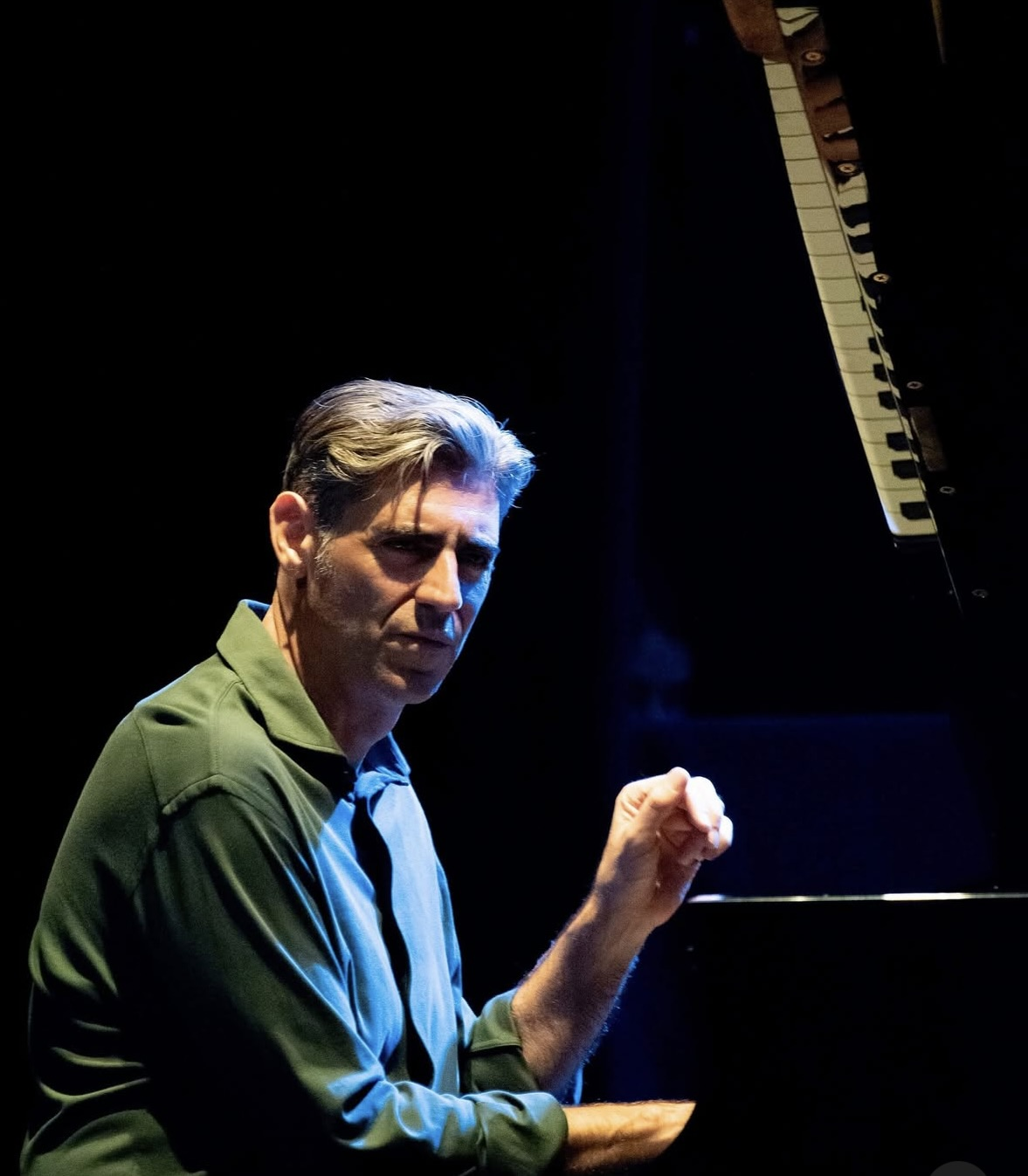
- Manu Koch at Teatro Oriente in Santiago, Chile October 18, 2025

Background information
- Born: Manuel Silvan Koch; June 12, 1972 (age 54); Baar, Switzerland
- Occupations: Musician, composer, producer
- Instruments: Piano, keyboards, synthesizer
- Years active: Mid-1990s–present
- Label: Filtron M
- Website: www.manukoch.com filtronm.com

Manu Koch (born June 12, 1972, in Baar, Switzerland) is a Swiss pianist, keyboardist and composer.

== Life and career ==
Koch studied classical piano from age 6 and started tenor saxophone at age 18 while also taking courses at the Jazz School Lucerne. In 1993 he attended Berklee College of Music in Boston where he graduated four years later and relocated to New York in May 2000 where he still lives today. Besides touring around the world with various projects since the late 1990s he has spent extended amounts of time in India, Brazil and China (Hong Kong).

His sideman work includes collaborations with Angélique Kidjo (US Oyaya! touring band from 2004 to 2006), Santana’s musical director and former Miles Davis bassist Benny Rietveld (various projects since 2005), Teodora Enache, Prasanna, Kofo The Wonderman (band member since 2007), KJ Denhert, Malika Zarra, Fantcha, the Mendes Brothers (João and Ramiro Mendes), the New York Gypsy All-Stars (touring the US, Brazil, Europe and Asia from 2011-2016), and participating on 15 album productions by blues/soul artist Tomás Doncker for True Groove Records since 2012.

== Filtron M ==
Koch’s own project Filtron M is a platform of a multi-national network of musicians and a compositional display of his extensive influences. The core idea of Filtron M goes back to the formation of his first group with Anat Cohen, Guilherme Monteiro, Gustavo Amarante and Harvey Wirht during his Boston years in the late 1990s. After Koch’s official debut album Triple Life (2011) he released the EP Mandatory Underground (2014) which introduces the initial members of Filtron M with Panagiotis Andreou and Patrick Andy on bass, Mauricio Zottarelli and Harvey Wirht on drums, and Sebastian Nickoll and Brahim Fribgane on percussion. The album Astoria Roots Live (2017) features additional guests with performances at Iridium in New York City and at Moods in Zürich. Other musicians that have appeared with Filtron M in performances, videos or on recordings include Samuel Torres, Camila Meza, Gino Sitson and Kaïssa.

== Discography ==
=== As leader/Filtron M ===
Year recorded	Title	Label	Personnel/Notes
2011	Triple Life	Self-released Manu Koch	with Malika Zarra (voice), Panagiotis Andreou, Manu Koch (bass, voice), Balla Tounkara (kora), Mister Rourke (turntables), Brahim Fribgane (oud, percussion), Apostolos Sideris (bass), Matt Dickey (guitar), Harvey Wirht (drums), Yuval Lion (drums), George Mel (drums, percussion), Sebastian Nickoll (percussion), Engin Gunaydin (percussion), Jovol Bell (drums), Ghatam Karthick (percussion, konnakol), students of SAM (konnakol)
2014	Mandatory Underground	True Groove Records	with Patrick Andy (bass), Panagiotis Andreou (bass), Harvey Wirht (drums), Mauricio Zottarelli (drums), Brahim Fribgane (percussion), Sebastian Nickoll (percussion)
2017	Astoria Roots Live	True Groove Records	with Camila Meza (voice, guitar), Yaite Ramos (voice, flute), David Barnes (harmonica), Tamer Pinarbasi (kanun), Panagiotis Andreou (bass, voice), Mauricio Zottarelli (drums), Samuel Torres (congas), Sebastian Nickoll (congas)
2021	Transit Net		with Tammy Scheffer (voice), Gino Sitson (voice), Christiane Karam (voice), Obed Jean-Louis (voice), Elsa Nilsson (flute), Juancho Herrera, (guitar) Yusuke Yamamoto (electric vibes), Damon Banks (bass), Derek Nievergelt (bass), Patrick Andy (bass), Jennifer Vincent (bass), Bam Rodriguez (bass), Mauricio Zottarelli (drums), Harvey Wirht (drums), Yuval Lion (drums), Karina Colis (drums), Franco Pinna (drums), Marcel Moldovan (drums), Nikki Glaspie (drums), Gilmar Gomes (percussion), Mister Rourke (turntables)

=== As sideman ===
Year recorded	Title	Label	Personnel/Notes
2010	KJ Denhert: Album N° 9	Motéma Music	
2012	Tomás Doncker: The Power of Trinity	True Groove Records	Deluxe Edition
2013	Kevin Jenkins: Step Inside	True Groove Records	
2015	True Groove All-Stars: Fully Re-Covered	True Groove Records	ft. James Chance
2015	Kofo The Wonderman: "Message 102 Fire in the World"	Network Records	
2016	Marla Mase: Miracles – Lost & Found	True Groove Records	
2016	Teodora Enache: Transfiguration	Madman Junkyard	
2017	Kevin Jenkins: She: a Tribute to Joni Mitchell	True Groove Records	
2017	Tomás Doncker: The Mess We Made	True Groove Records	Deluxe Edition
2019	State Of Time: Boeuf in the Basement	Orfena Music	
2020	Nikolett Pankovits: River	Ninwood Music	ft. The River Voices
2020	Russ Nolan: Sin Fronteras		
2026	BZSounds: Rabbit Holes	Head Bitch Music	
2026	Claudia Acuña: Ave De Luz	SS Recordings	
