= Pombo Musical =

Studio album by Various artists
- Released: August 13, 2008
- Recorded: 2006
- Genre: Folk; Latin pop
- Length: 51:53
- Label: Gaira Música Local
- Producer: Claudia Elena Vásquez (exec.); Carlos Vives

Singles from Pombo Musical
- 1. "El Modelo Alfabético" Released: July 24, 2008

Pombo Musical is a children's album produced by Colombian recording artist Carlos Vives, as a musical tribute to the Colombian writer and poet Rafael Pombo. It was released on August 13, 2008, under Vives' label Gaira Música Local. The album came into fruition when Rafael Pombo Foundation president Juanita Santos asked Vives to craft a musical that uses Pombo's most iconic poems and fables he created. Its music incorporates a variety of Colombian folk genres and mixes in contemporary genres like Latin pop and pop rock. Among the 14 tracks present in the album, only one was released as a single, "El Modelo Alfabético" (English: The Model Alphabetical). All the lyrics were written originally by Rafael Pombo, and produced by Vives. Pombo Musical was well-received, and was certified platinum in Colombia by the Asociación Colombiana de Productores de Fonogramas (ASINCOL). It also won some accolades, including a Latin Grammy Award for Best Latin Children's Album, and a Premio Shock for Best Compilation.

== Background ==
I am only one of the producers who worked on the record. It was the dream of many Bogotan musicians to make Pombo Musical, I became the spokesman of them to make the project... Pombo's fables, his poems of values and truths, we describe him, whoever works for Pombo works for the children.

— Vives on Pombo Musical

After finishing the promotion of his previous studio album El Rock de Mi Pueblo (2004), Vives ended his music contract with EMI Latin and took a hiatus, for concentrating on supporting local artists as a producer and songwriter. He then met Juanita Santos, the president of Rafael Pombo Foundation, who asked them to present a proposal for a musical that uses the most iconic poems and fables created by Pombo. Motivated by this, they began to study many books about Pombo and his works. The creation of Pombo Musical began as a studio project in house between old friends, Carlos Ivan Medina, Carlos Huertas and Ernesto "Teto" Ocampo. He stated: "Before we worked musically on some of Rafael Pombo's works, without thinking about making a record, but because somebody had done a melody of Rin Rin". Together with Medina, Vives made a melody for "Modelo Alfabético". On July 24, 2008, Vives released "El Modelo Alfabético", a song based on a poem by Pombo, with influences of cumbia and rock as the album's lead single.

The recording of the album took two years, due to the number of artists contributing to it, namely, Juanes, Aterciopelados, Fonseca, Santiago Cruz, Verónica Orozco, Dúo Huellas, Ilona, Eduardo Arias & Karl Troller, Andrea Echeverri, Lucía Pulido, Iván Benavides, Carlos Ivan Medina, Bernardo Velasco, Ernesto Ocampo, Fundación Batuta Chorus, Distrito Especial, H2 El Guajiro, Adriana Lucía, Guillermo Vives and Julio Navas. The music launch was held in Gaira Café Cumbia House bar in Bogotá, Colombia on August 13, 2008.

== Composition ==
The record was produced by Vives under the executive production of his wife, Claudia Elena Vasquez. The recording of Pombo Musical took two years in four music studios in Colombia. The album comprises songs from a variety of Colombian folk genres like vallenato, bambuco, joropo and cumbia. Some songs mix genres such as Latin pop and pop rock. Opening track, "El Modelo Alfabético" ("The Model Alphabetical"), is a rock-stylized cumbia and vallenato song performed by Vives, the Dúo Huellas, Eduardo Arias and Karl Troller, about being a real gentleman, such as having good manners, and also teaches the alphabet to children. "El Renacuajo Paseador" ("The Tadpole Walker"), is a bambuco song performed by Andrea Echeverri, Lucia Pulido, Iván Benavides, Carlos Ivan Medina, Bernardo Velasco, Ernesto Ocampo, Dúo Huellas, Fundación Batuta Chorus, and Vives. It tells the story about a tadpole named "Rin Rin", that left his home without the approval of his mother "Rana" ("Frog"), and subsequently dies when he hides in the mouth of a duck. In this song, Echeverri added additional lines to it. Juanes performs on "El Gato Bandido" ("The Bandit Cat"), a pop rock song about a cat that rebels against his family and leaves home, discovering that things are not easy by yourself, and returns feeling repentant. Aterciopelados performs on "Mirringa Mirronga", which is about a feline mega-party.

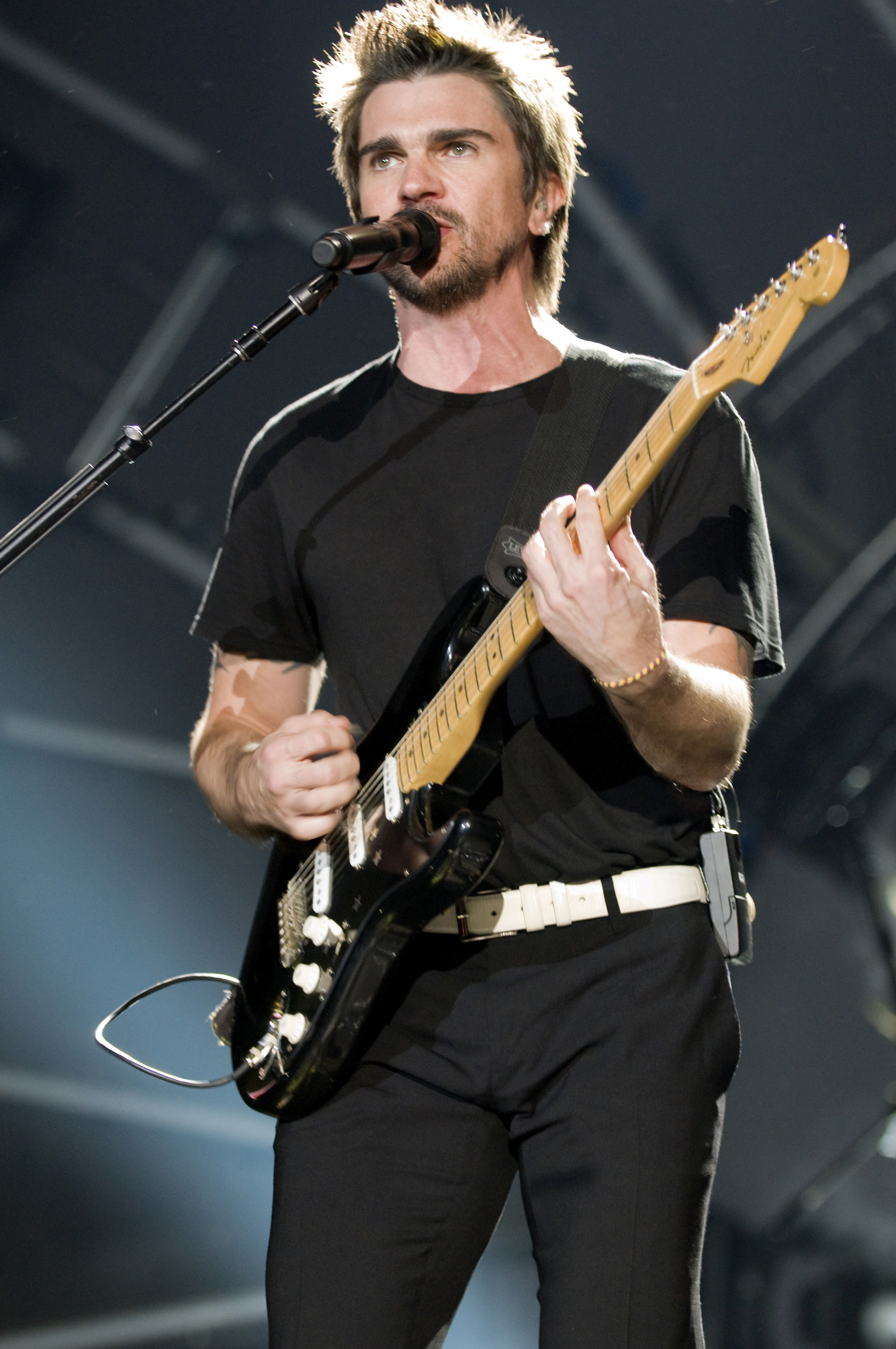
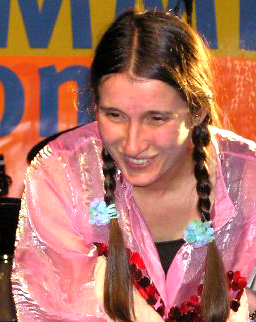
Pombo Musical features vocals by Juanes (left) and Andrea Echeverri (right).

"El Robanidos" ("The Rob-nests") is a tropipop song performed by Fonseca, Dúo Huellas and the Fundación Batuta Chorus, about a kid that robs a nest and is then eaten by a black cat. Verónica Orozco performs on "Pastorcita" ("Little Shepherdess"), a rock song that tells the story of a little shepherdess that loses her sheep and then finds them. "El Coche" ("The Car"), performed by Distrito Especial, is about a car that impresses all the people who see it. Lucia Polido performs on "Dios y el Alma" ("God and the Soul"), a joropo song about Pombo's personal perception about the soul. "Juan Chunguero" is about the bagpiper Chunguero, who after angering many people falls in love with a shepherdess.

"Simón el Bobito" ("Simón the Little Fool") is performed by Santiago Cruz and H2 El Guajiro, done in the tradition of a popular English nursery rhyme that tells the life of a child called Simon. "El Niño y la Mariposa" ("The Kid and the Butterfly"), performed by Adriana Lucía and Dúo Huellas, is about a butterfly that asks a child not to mistreat her. "La Pobre Viejecita" ("The Little Poor Old Woman") is a bambuco song performed by both Vives and his brother, telling the story of an unhappy old woman who dies alone. "La Tia Pasitrote" ("The Pasitrote Aunt") is a funk rock song performed by Ilona about the adventures of a crazy aunt. Julio Navas performs the album closer, "Juan Matachín", about the widespread fear put upon by the titular General.

== Reception ==
Pombo Musical was generally well received. The record was certified platinum in Colombia with over 22,000 copies sold. At the Colombian Premios Shock, the album won for Best Compilation, and at the 10th Latin Grammy Awards it won the Best Latin Children's Album. According to the Colombian newspaper El Tiempo, Pombo was one of the most memorable albums of 2008, not only for musical quality but also by its commercial success.

== Track listing ==
All tracks are written by Rafael Pombo.

Pombo Musical – Standard edition
No.	Title	Performer(s)	Length
1.	"El Modelo Alfabético"	Carlos Vives; Dúo Huellas; Eduardo Arias & Karl Troller	3:44
2.	"El Renacuajo Paseador"	Vives; Andrea Echeverri; Lucia Pulido; Iván Benavides; Carlos Ivan Medina; Bernardo Velasco; Ernesto Ocampo; Dúo Huellas; Fundación Batuta Chorus	4:55
3.	"El Gato Bandido"	Juanes	4:31
4.	"Mirringa Mirronga"	Aterciopelados	3:41
5.	"El Robanidos"	Fonseca; Dúo Huellas; Fundación Batuta Chorus	3:43
6.	"Pastorcita"	Verónica Orozco	3:31
7.	"El Coche"	Distrito Especial	2:46
8.	"Dios y el Alma"	Lucia Pulido	4:44
9.	"Juan Chunguero"	Cabas	3:31
10.	"Simón el Bobito"	Santiago Cruz; H2 El Guajiro	4:06
11.	"El Niño y la Mariposa"	Adriana Lucía; Dúo Huellas	2:55
12.	"La Pobre Viejecita"	Vives; Guillermo Vives	3:20
13.	"La Tia Pasipotre"	Ilona	4:29
14.	"Juan Matachín"	Julio Navas	2:53

== Certifications ==
Region	Certification	Certified units/sales
Colombia (ASINCOL)	Platinum	20,000
