= Sara Serpa =

Portuguese jazz vocalist

- Born: Lisbon, Portugal
- Genres: Jazz, vocal jazz
- Occupation: Vocalist
- Labels: Clean Feed, Sunnyside
- Website: Official site

Sara Serpa is a jazz vocalist from Lisbon, Portugal.

== Career ==
For ten years Serpa studied classical piano and vocals, then studied jazz at the Lisbon Conservatory. After moving to Boston, she attended the Berklee College of Music. She recorded her debut album Praia (Inner Circle Music, 2008) the same year she received a master's degree from the New England Conservatory. Her teachers included Danilo Pérez, Dominique Eade, and Ran Blake. Two years later she recorded Camera Obscura with her mentor Blake. Early in her career she performed with Greg Osby at the Vanguard in New York City. She sang on Osby's album 9 Levels. In the DownBeat magazine Critics' Poll of 2019, she was voted the number one Rising Star among female vocalists. DownBeat named Intimate Strangers one of the top albums of 2022.

Serpa, Malika Zarra, Ayelet Rose Gottlieb, and Sofia Rei were the four vocalists of John Zorn's project Mycale.

Among the influences and musicians she admires, she has named Louis Armstrong, Ella Fitzgerald, Miles Davis, Carmen McRae, Sarah Vaughan, Maria João, Billie Holiday, Antonio Carlos Jobim, Wayne Shorter, Bjork, Hermeto Pascoal, Theo Bleckmann, Brad Mehldau, and Bill Evans.

== Discography ==
- Praia (Inner Circle Music, 2008)
- Camera Obscura with Ran Blake (Inner Circle, 2010)
- Mobile (Inner Circle, 2011)
- Aurora with Ran Blake (Clean Feed, 2012)
- Primavera with Andre Matos (Inner Circle, 2014)
- Kitano Noir with Ran Blake (Sunnyside, 2015)
- All the Dreams with Andre Matos (Sunnyside, 2016)
- Close Up (Clean Feed, 2018)
- Recognition (Biophilia, 2020)
- Intimate Strangers (Biophilia, 2021)
- Night Birds with Andre Matos (Robalo, 2023)
