= Malika Zarra =

- Born: Ouled Teima, Morocco
- Genres: Jazz, world music
- Occupation: singer
- Years active: 2006–present
- Label: Motéma Music
- Website: www.malikazarra.com

Malika Zarra is a Moroccan singer, composer, and music producer based in Paris. She is known for singing in Moroccan Arabic, Berber, French, and English in a broad range of jazz and world music.

== Biography ==
Zarra was born in Ouled Teima, the eldest of five children to a Berber mother from the High Atlas and a father from Tata. Her family moved to Paris when she was young, but remained culturally Moroccan at home. In school, she studied clarinet. She became interested in jazz because it was similar to Arabic traditional music in the core importance of improvisation. She studied at the jazz conservatories at Tours and Marseille and studied privately with Sarah Lazarus and Françoise Galais. Zarra relocated to New York City in 2004. She returned to Paris in 2019.

== Career ==
Zarra has performed with Makoto Ozone, Gretchen Parlato, Jacques Schwarz-Bart, Tommy Campbell, Will Calhoun, Lonnie Plaxico, Andy Milne, Michael Cain, Jason Lindner, Omer Avital, Brad Jones, James Hurt, Keith Carlock, David Gilmore, Aaron Heick, Brahim Fribgane, Harvie S, Kenny Davis, Jerome Harris, Francis Jacob, Manu Koch, Sachal Vasandani, and many other artists.

Zarra, Ayelet Rose Gottlieb, Sofia Rei, and Sara Serpa were the four vocalists of John Zorn's 2009 project Mycale. She was also featured on the Arturo O'Farrill album Virtual Birdland, which was nominated for a Grammy Award for Best Latin Jazz Album in 2021.

In addition to solo appearances in front of a backing band, Zarra performs with Aruán Ortiz's ensemble Flamenco Criollo, and Les Sahariennes, a vocal group that includes singers from Algeria, Morocco, and Mauritania.

== Music ==
Zarra's music is influenced by traditional Berber music, Gnawa music, Chaabi, French popular music, jazz, house, funk, dance, and traditional African music. Specific personal influences include Haja El Hamdaouia, Rais Mohand, Farid al-Atrash, Um Kalthoum, Warda Al-Jazairia, Ella Fitzgerald, Bobby McFerrin, Thelonious Monk, Stevie Wonder, and Aretha Franklin. She is a mezzo-soprano.

== Discography ==
=== As leader ===
- On the Ebony Road (CD Baby, 2006)
- Berber Taxi (Motéma Music, 2011)
- RWA (The Essence) (D.Zel, 2023)

=== Collaborations ===
- Mycale: Book of Angels Volume 13 (Tzadik, 2009)
- Brooklyn Connection, Jay Rodriguez (Cheetah Records, 2010)
- Nova Express, John Zorn (Tadzik, 2011)
- Faithful, Marcin Wasilewski Trio (ECM, 2011)
- Je Sais Nager, Irène Jacob and Francis Jacob (Sunnyside, 2012)
- Undivided, Morley (2012)
- De Tierra y Oro, Sofia Rei (Lilihouse Music, 2012)
- World Songs, Kevin Reveyrand (2013)
- Sly Reimagined, Global Noise (Zoho Music, 2013)
- Aftermath, Amy Lee (110 Records, 2014)
- Virtual Birdland, Arturo O'Farrill and Afro Latin Jazz Orchestra (2021)
