= Latin Grammy Award for Best Female Pop Vocal Album =

Music award category

- Awarded for: recordings of the pop genre by a female performer
- Country: United States
- Presented by: The Latin Recording Academy
- First award: 2001
- Final award: 2011
- Website: latingrammy.com

The Latin Grammy Award for Best Female Pop Vocal Album was an honor presented annually at the Latin Grammy Awards from 2001 to 2011 The award was given to a female performer for albums containing at least 51 percent of new recordings of the pop genre. Since its inception, the award category has had several name changes. In 2000 was known as Best Female Pop Vocal Performance, being awarded for singles or tracks. The following year onwards the award for Best Female Pop Vocal Album was presented.

The award has been presented to singers originating from Canada, Colombia, Italy, Puerto Rico, Spain, and the United States. The award for Female Pop Vocal Performance at the 1st Latin Grammy Awards was earned by Colombian singer-songwriter Shakira for the song "Ojos Así". Shakira was also awarded Female Pop Vocal Album in 2006 for Fijación Oral Vol. 1 (which also received the Latin Grammy for Album of the Year) and in 2011 for her album Sale el Sol. In 2001, the award winners were announced at a press conference, since the 2nd Latin Grammy Awards were scheduled to take place on September 11, 2001. Christina Aguilera received the award for her first Spanish language album Mi Reflejo.

== Recipients ==
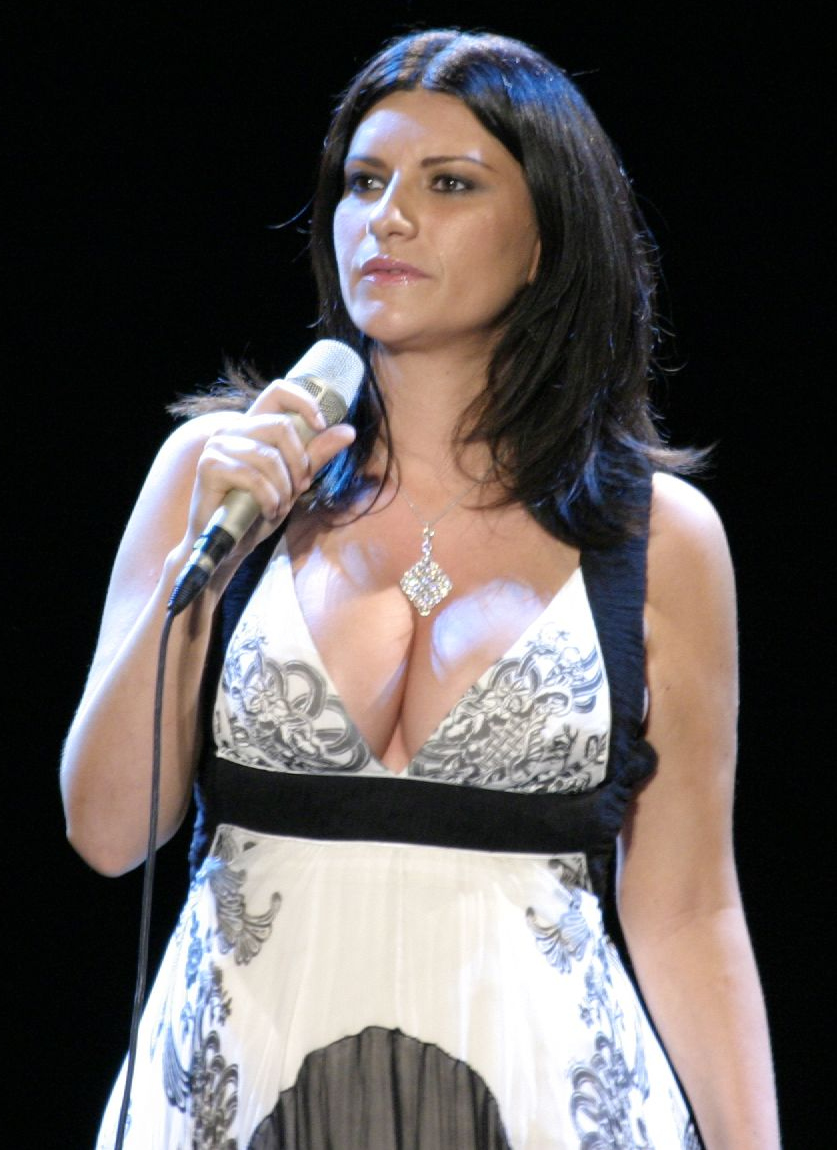
Three-time winner Laura Pausini

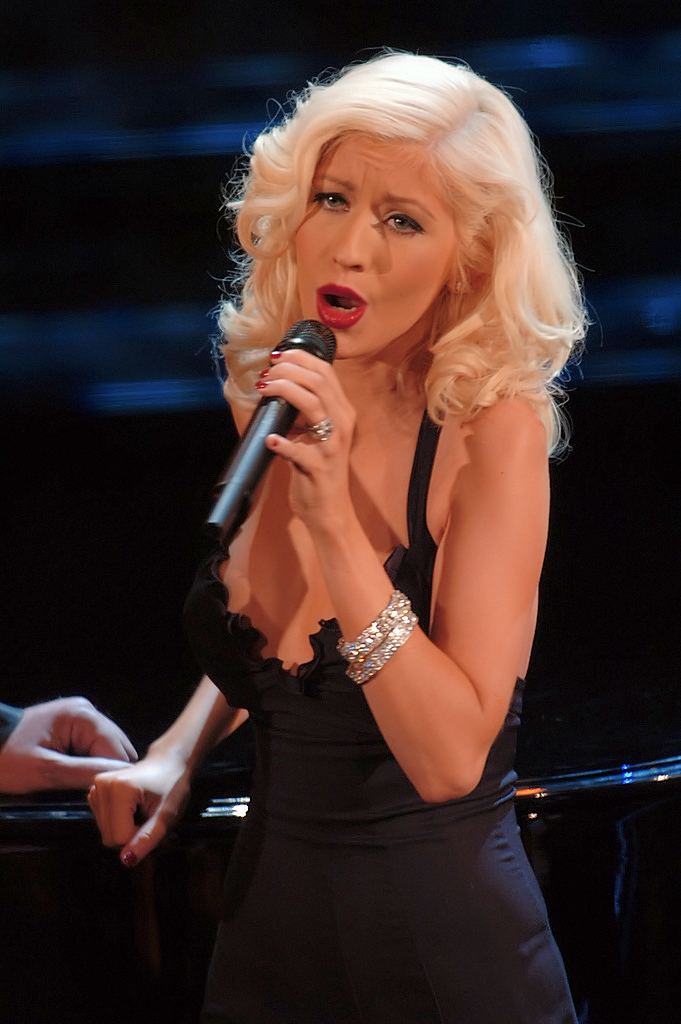
American singer Christina Aguilera, winner in 2001

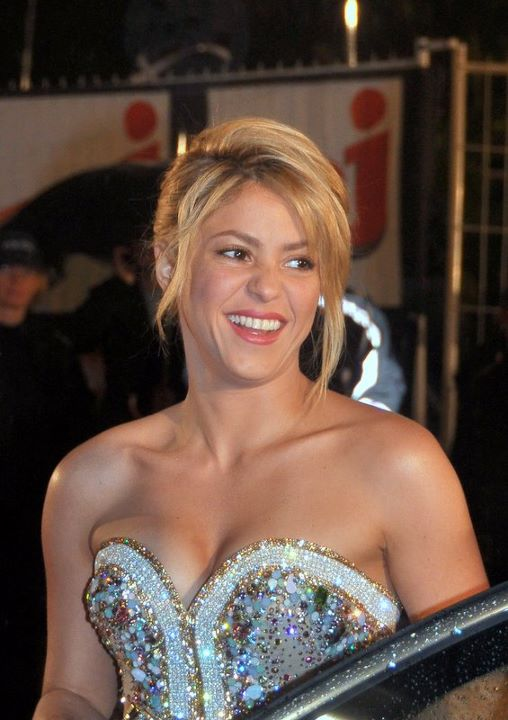
Three-time winner Shakira

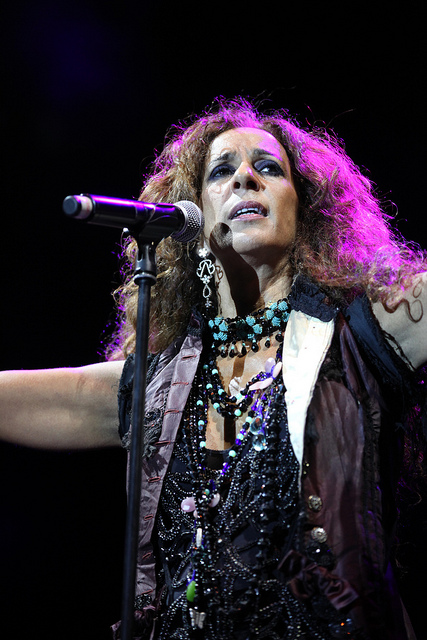
Two-time winner Rosario Flores

=== 2000s ===
Year^{[I]}	Performing artist	Work	Nominees	Ref.
2000	Shakira	"Ojos Así"	Christina Aguilera – "Genio Atrapado"; Zizi Possi – "Meu Erro"; Mercedes Sosa – "Al Despertar"; Jaci Velasquez – "Llegar a Ti"	
2001	Christina Aguilera	Mi Reflejo	Natalia Oreiro – Tu Veneno; Laura Pausini – Entre Tú y Mil Mares; Paulina Rubio – Paulina; Thalía – Arrasando	
2002	Rosario Flores	Muchas Flores	Ana Belén – Peces de Ciudad; Cecilia Echenique – Secreta Intimidad; Mónica Molina – Vuela; Nicole – Viaje Infinito	
2003	Olga Tañón	Sobrevivir	Gisselle – En Alma, Cuerpo y Corazón; Ednita Nazario – Acústico; Thalía – Thalía; Ana Torroja – Frágil	
2004	Rosario Flores	De Mil Colores	Rocío Dúrcal – Caramelito; Ednita Nazario – Por Tí; Paulina Rubio – Pau-Latina; Jaci Velasquez – Milagro	
2005	Laura Pausini	Escucha	Bebe – Pafuera Telarañas; Andrea Echeverri – Andrea Echeverri; Fey – La Fuerza del Destino; Soraya – El Otro Lado de Mi	
2006	Shakira	Fijación Oral Vol. 1	Anaís – Así Soy Yo; Rosario Flores – Contigo Me Voy; Ines Gaviria – A Mi Manera; Niña Pastori – Joyas Prestadas; Thalía – El Sexto Sentido (Re+Loaded)	
2007	Laura Pausini	Yo Canto	Ana Belén – Anatomía; Belinda – Utopía; Shaila Dúrcal – Recordando...; Ilona – Allá en el Sur	
2008	Kany García	Cualquier Día	Ana Gabriel – Arpegios de Amor: Requiem por Tres almas; Alejandra Guzmán – Fuerza; Rosario Flores – Parte de Mí; Ednita Nazario – Real	
2009	Laura Pausini	Primavera Anticipada	Jimena Ángel – Día Azul; Natalia Lafourcade – Hu Hu Hu; Amaia Montero – Amaia Montero; Luz Rios – Aire	

=== 2010s ===
Year^{[I]}	Performing artist	Work	Nominees	Ref.
2010	Nelly Furtado	Mi Plan	Bebe – Y.; Estrella – Black Flamenco; Rosario Flores – Cuéntame; Kany García – Boleto de Entrada	
2011	Shakira	Sale el Sol	Claudia Brant – Manuscrito; Myriam Hernández – Seducción; Malú – Guerra Fría; Merche – Acordes de Mi Diario	

^{^[I]} Each year is linked to the article about the Latin Grammy Awards held that year.

== See also ==
- List of music awards honoring women
- Grammy Award for Best Female Pop Vocal Performance
- Latin Grammy Award for Best Male Pop Vocal Album
- Latin Grammy Award for Best Pop Vocal Album, Duo or Group
- Latin Grammy Award for Best Contemporary Pop Vocal Album
- Latin Grammy Award for Best Traditional Pop Vocal Album
