= De Mil Colores =

De Mil Colores (English: Of a Thousand Colors) may refer to:

- De Mil Colores (Daniela Romo album), 1992
- De mil colores (Rosario Flores album), 2003
