= Mycale (disambiguation) =

Mycale is a mountain in Turkey.

Mycale may also refer to:

- Mycale (genus), a genus of demosponges in the family Mycalidae
- Mycale (vocal ensemble), an American avant-garde vocal group
