= Rinrin =

Rinrin may refer to:

== People ==
- Qian Lin (born 1991), Chinese singer better known in Japan as Lin Lin, sometimes romanized as Rinrin
- Rintaro Tokunaga (born 1987), Japanese professional basketball player
- RinRin Doll (born 1988), American model and blogger based in Japan
- Rinrin Marinka (Maria Irene Susanto, born 1980), Indonesian chef and restaurateur
- Rinrin & Ranran, a musical duo in Japan and Hong Kong in the 1970s

== Fictional characters ==
- Rin Rin the tadpole, a stock character of Colombian poet Rafael Pombo
- Rinrin, in the Anpanman Japanese children's superhero picture book series
- Rinrin, in the light novel series Sister Princess
- Rinrin, in the manga Keijo
- Rinrin, in the manga By the Sword (manga)
- Rinrin Takahashi, in the manga Trillion Game
- Rinrin, in Koihime Musō visual novel and anime series
- Rinrin, a fictional idol group in the video for "Netsuai Hakkakuchū"
- Kagamine Rin, a Vocaloid software voicebank developed by Crypton Future Media.
