= Verónica Valerio =

Mexican harpist, singer and composer

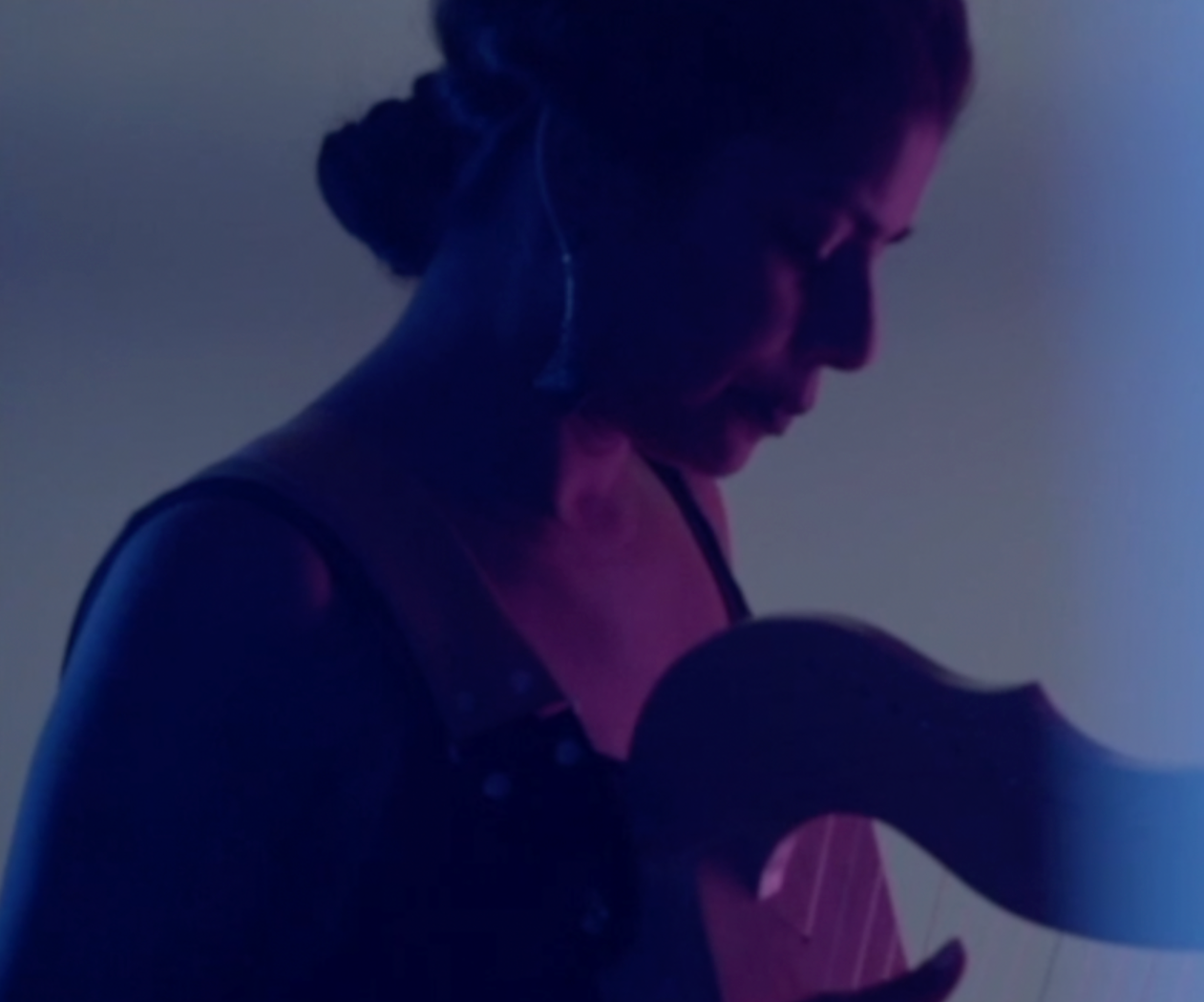

Background information
- Origin: Veracruz, Mexico
- Genres: World, Latin
- Years active: 2000–present
- Labels: BMG
- Website: www.veronicavalerio.com

Verónica Valerio (born 1981) is a Mexican harpist, singer and composer. She first performed when she was 19, singing boleros with the Juventud Sonera band in her native Puerto de Veracruz. She went on to study blues in New Orleans before attending the Boys & Girls Harbor conservatory in New York. In 2006 she performed at Carnegie Hall and appeared in the documentary Arpa Viajera produced by New York University. She then returned to Mexico but has since appeared in Asia, the Americas and Europe and has made numerous recordings. In 2021, she collaborated with the American singer and composer Van Dyke Parks.

== Biography ==
Born in Veracruz in 1981, Verónica Valerio was brought up in a family in which both her father and her uncle were harpists. She embarked on her professional career in her home town when she was 19, singing boleros with the Afro-Caribbean band Juventud Sonera. She then spent a year in New Orleans with musicians specializing in blues before moving to New York where she attended the Boys and Girls Harbor music conservatory. She showed interest in a variety of genres, including gospel, salsa and cumbia, all of which contributed to her development as an experimental composer. She adapted her song-writing to poetic renderings of topics of contemporary social interest while evoking the sea, the coast, loneliness and contrasts between town and country.

In 2006, she appeared at New York's Carnegie Hall and as the star of the documentary film Arpa Viajera produced by the Anthropology Department of New York University. She then returned to Mexico to appear in a series of vocal and harp performances presented as "Yo Vengo Aqui".

In August 2017, she appeared in Mexico City's Teatro de la Ciudad together with Sofía Rei from Argentina and Lucía Pulido from Colombia in the Latin-American music show 3 voces, 3 mujeres, 3 vanguardias. She has also performed in Asia, Europe and elsewhere in Latin America and has made many recordings.

== Discography ==
- Viajes de Ida y Vueltaa (2013)
- Canciones de Puertos (2015)
- Van Dyke Parks orchestrates Verónica Valerio: Only in America (2021)
