= Mycale: Book of Angels Volume 13 =

Studio album by Mycale
- Released: January 2010
- Recorded: October 1–5, 2009
- Genre: Avant-garde, contemporary classical music, choral music
- Length: 33:51
- Label: Tzadik
- Producer: John Zorn

Book of Angels chronology
Stolas: Book of Angels Volume 12 (2009)	Mycale: Book of Angels Volume 13 (2010)	Ipos: Book of Angels Volume 14 (2010)

John Zorn chronology
Femina (2009)	Mycale: Book of Angels Volume 13 (2010)	In Search of the Miraculous (2010)

Mycale: Book of Angels Volume 13 is an album by the vocal group Mycale performing compositions from John Zorn's second Masada book, "The Book of Angels". Ayelet Rose Gottlieb stated "We've been told that we have managed to create our own "language" within this a cappella quartet ... the foundation is our music are the compositions of John Zorn, which in this case are melodic tunes, based on the "jewish scale" ... but always with a twist that sends the pieces off to another place, beyond straight klezmer ... on top of that are our arrangements, and text choices."

== Reception ==
Professional ratings
Review scores
Source	Rating
Don't Count On It	3.5/5 stars

Ian Flick awarded the album 3½ stars stating, "Overall, this is a very strange album and although it's not a hard or really taxing listen, it's just so off the wall I'm not sure I get it. There's just this atmosphere of pure strangeness that I just can't put my finger on whether this is good, bad, or just decent. If you want something totally avant-garde by one it's key players, check this out."

== Track listing ==
All compositions by John Zorn.

1. "Uzziel" - 3:10
2. "Ahaha"- 2:53
3. "El El" - 2:19
4. "Tehom" - 2:26
5. "Moloch" - 2:32
6. "Balam" - 3:12
7. "Melech" - 2:47
8. "Tarshish" - 4:01
9. "Asaph" - 3:18
10. "Rumiel" - 2:55
11. "Natiel" - 4:10

== Personnel ==
- Ayelet Rose Gottlieb - voice
- Sofia Rei Koutsovitis - voice
- Basya Schecter - voice
- Malika Zarra - voice
