= Muchas Flores =

Studio album by Rosario Flores
- Released: September 20, 2001
- Genre: Latin pop
- Length: 37:44
- Label: BMG International
- Producer: Fernando Illán, Cachorro López

Rosario Flores chronology
| Jugar a la Locura (1999) | Muchas Flores (2001) | De Mil Colores (2003) |

Muchas Flores (Many Flowers) is the sixth studio album released by Spanish performer Rosario Flores. It was released by BMG International in September 20, 2001. The album was produced by Fernando Illán and Cachorro López. Muchas Flores earned Flores a Latin Grammy Award for Best Female Pop Vocal Album. Flores recorded songs written by Jorge Drexler, Andrés Calamaro, Alberto Moraga and herself. The album lead single, "Cómo Quieres Que Te Quiera", features the participation of Raimundo Amador playing guitar and Luis Dulzaines on percussion, and peaked at number three in Spain.

The release of the album was named "the return of Rosario," since critics and public rejected her previous album, Jugar a la Locura (1999), a Rock-infused album. Muchas Flores proved to be a success, selling 250,000 units in Spain, aided by the singer exposure on Talk to Her, a 2002 film by Pedro Almodóvar. Flores also did a small promotional tour in the United States to benefit the album, and a full length worldwide tour, which lasted two years and concluded with the recording of her following album De Mil Colores.

Muchas Flores received mixed critical reviews. Chris Nickson of AllMusic gave the album 2 stars out of 5. Nickson named Flores an "excellent singer", with the album starting with a raw flamenco yell and flourish, but quickly becomes straight forward Latin pop without "too many sparks flying."

== Track listing ==
This information adapted from Allmusic.

| No. | Title | Writer(s) | Length |
|---|---|---|---|
| 1. | "Al Son del Tambor" | Antonio González, Rosario Flores, Lolita | 3:57 |
| 2. | "Cómo Quieres Que Te Quiera" | R. Flores | 4:27 |
| 3. | "Agua y Sal" | Jorge Drexler, Alberto Moraga | 3:12 |
| 4. | "Muchas Flores" | Pedro Pubill Calaf, Juan Ramón Reyes | 3:46 |
| 5. | "Rosa y Miel" | Jorge Drexler, R. Flores, Salomon Motos | 4:00 |
| 6. | "Búscame" | R. Flores | 3:38 |
| 7. | "La Casa en el Aire" | Rafael Calixto Escalona | 3:20 |
| 8. | "Tuyo Siempre" | Andrés Calamaro | 3:22 |
| 9. | "Déjame Ver" | R. Flores | 4:26 |
| 10. | "Diferente" | Alberto Moraga, Antonio Rodríguez | 3:27 |
| 11. | "Meneíto" | Rafael Ithier ©1965 | 3:24 |

== Charts ==
| Chart (2001) | Peak position |
|---|---|
| Spain (PROMUSICAE) | 3 |

== Certifications ==
| Region | Certification | Certified units/sales |
|---|---|---|
| Spain (Promusicae) | 2× Platinum | 200,000^{^} |
^{^} Shipments figures based on certification alone.
