= Rosario Flores =

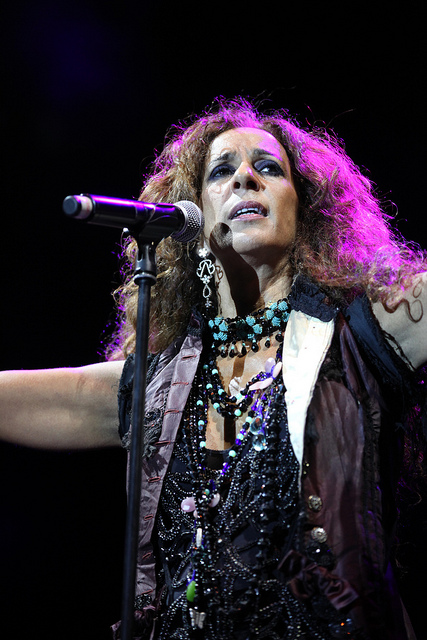

Background information
- Born: Rosario del Carmen González Flores; 4 November 1963 (age 62)
- Origin: Madrid, Spain
- Genres: Rumba, Flamenco, Bossanova, Latin pop
- Years active: 1992–present
- Label: BMG Ariola

Rosario del Carmen González Flores (born 4 November 1963), better known as Rosario Flores (Spanish pronunciation: [roˈsaɾjo ˈfloɾes]), is a two-time Latin Grammy Award-winning Spanish singer and actress.

She was born in Madrid, Spain, as the daughter of Antonio González ('El Pescaílla') and singer Lola Flores. She is the sister of singer Lolita Flores and singer-songwriter Antonio Flores.

== Awards and nominations ==
=== Latin Grammy Awards ===
The Latin Grammy Awards are awarded annually by the Latin Academy of Recording Arts & Sciences in the United States. Flores has received two awards from seven nominations.

Year	Nominee / work	Award	Result
2000	"Jugar a la Locura"	Best Female Rock Vocal Performance	Nominated
2002	Muchas Flores	Best Female Pop Vocal Album	Won
2004	De Mil Colores	Best Female Pop Vocal Album	Won
2006	Contigo Me Voy	Best Female Pop Vocal Album	Nominated
2008	Parte de Mi	Best Female Pop Vocal Album	Nominated
2010	Cuéntame	Best Female Pop Vocal Album	Nominated
2014	Rosario	Best Contemporary Pop Vocal Album	Nominated

== Discography ==
- De Ley (1992)
- Siento (1995)
- Mucho Por Vivir (1996)
- Jugar a la Locura (1999)
- Muchas Flores (2001)
- De Mil Colores (2004)
- Contigo Me Voy (2006)
- Parte de Mí (2008)
- Cuéntame (2009; soundtrack for the 11th season of Spanish TV series Cuéntame cómo pasó)
- Raskatriski (2011)
- Rosario (2013)
- Gloria a ti (2016)

== Filmography ==
Films
Year	Title	Role	Notes	Ref.
1988	Diario de invierno (Winter Diary)	Muda		
1990	Contra el viento (Against the Wind)	Rosario		
1991	Chatarra	Mariló		
2002	Habla con ella (Talk to Her)	Lydia Gonzalez		
2022	Puss in Boots: The Last Wish	Mama Luna	Spanish dub	
