= Ilona (singer) =

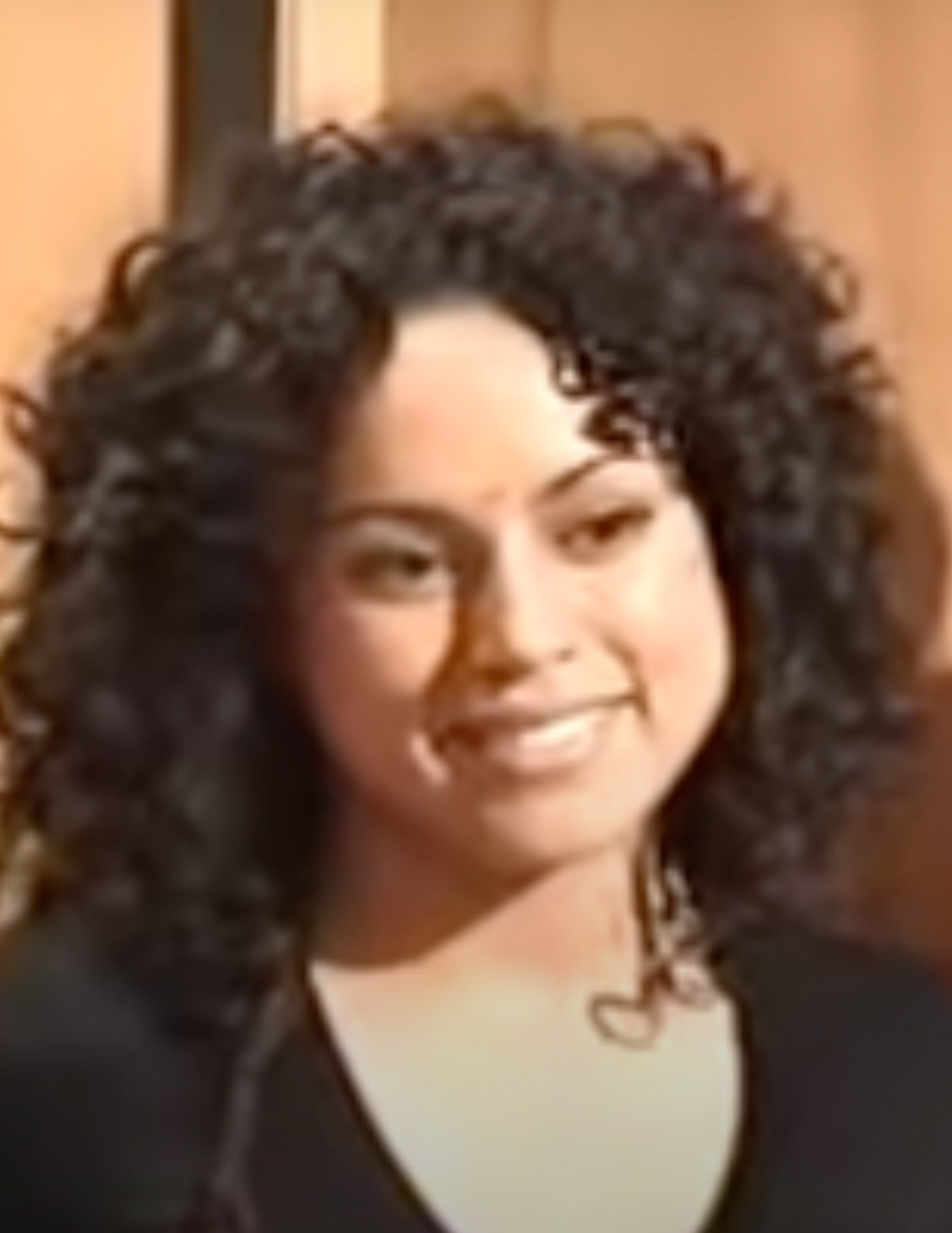
- Illona in 2008

Background information
- Born: 24 January 1985 (age 41); Bogotá, Colombia
- Genres: Rock, pop
- Occupation: Singer-songwriter
- Label: EMI Latin
- Website: http://ilonaoficial.com/cms/#!/splash-page

Ilona (born January 24, 1985) is a singer-songwriter born and raised in Bogotá, Colombia. Her beginnings in music were through presentations on the public transport bus service in Bogotá when she was 15 years old, and her surprised audience gave her money. Ilona played with her guitar on public places and eventually established a band with a bassist and a drummer with whom she performed regularly in bars in the city. At 24, Ilona released her first studio album, entitled Desde Mi Ventana ("From My Window"), produced by Cachorro López, gaining momentum, and receiving a Latin Grammy Award nomination for Best New Artist. Her debut album sold 15,000 units in Colombia earning the singer a Gold album certification. Ilona caught the attention of Argentine musician León Gieco and agreed to do a duet with her on the song "En La Zona". English boy band Blue also recorded with Ilona the song "One Love".

In 2004, Colombian singer Soraya, during her promotional tour in Chile, sponsored Ilona, who was visiting the country on a promotional plan on radio stations and newspapers. Upon learning of her presence in Chile, Soraya invited her as the opening act of her concert at the Teatro Providencia. Three years later, Ilona released her second album, Allá En El Sur, a 'rock' focused album produced by Benny Faccone. The album was nominated for a Latin Grammy Award for Best Female Pop Vocal Album at the 8th Latin Grammy Awards, losing to Yo Canto by Italian performer Laura Pausini. Ilona acknowledges as an influence to her music the work of Ella Fitzgerald, Tracy Chapman, Norah Jones, John Mayer, Alanis Morissette and Sting.

== Discography ==
- Desde mi Ventana (2005)
- Allá en el Sur (2007)
- Aquí y Ahora (2013)
- Viajera (2017)

== Awards and nominations ==
Ilona awards and nominations
Awards and nominations
Award	Wins	Nominations
Latin Grammy Awards	1	3
Los Premios MTV Latinoamérica	0	1
Premios Nuestra Tierra	0	2
Premios Shock	1	5

Totals (Note: Certain award groups do not simply award one winner. They acknowledge several different recipients, have runners-up, and have third place. Since this is a specific recognition and is different from losing an award, runner-up mentions are considered wins in this award tally. For simplification and to avoid errors, each award in this list has been presumed to have had a prior nomination.)
- Wins: 2
- Nominations: 11

=== Latin Grammy Awards ===
A Latin Grammy Award is an accolade by the Latin Academy of Recording Arts & Sciences to recognize outstanding achievement in the music industry. Ilona has received an award from three nominations; this award was won by the children's album with various artists.

Year	Nominee / work	Award	Result
2005	Ilona	Best New Artist	Nominated
2007	Allá en el Sur	Best Female Pop Vocal Album	Nominated
2009	Pombo Musical	Best Latin Children's Album	Won

=== Los Premios MTV Latinoamérica ===
Los Premios MTV Latinoamérica or VMALA's is the Latin American version of the Video Music Awards. Ilona received a nomination in 2006.

Year	Nominee / work	Award	Result
2006	Ilona	Best New Artist — Central	Nominated

=== Premios Shock ===
Shock Awards are the most important awards in Colombia. Ilona received an award in 2005.

Year	Nominee / work	Award	Result
2005	Ilona	Best New Artist	Won
2007	Allá en el Sur	Record of the Year	Nominated
2007	Ilona	Voice of the Year	Nominated
2007	Ilona	Best Artist or National Association	Nominated
2013	"Tu Mal Me Hizo Bien"	Best Female Soloist	Nominated

=== Premios Nuestra Tierra ===
Premios Nuestra Tierra is an annual awards show honouring the creativity and drive of Colombian artists since 2007.

Year	Nominee / work	Award	Result
2008	Ilona	Best Pop Solo or Group of the Year	Nominated
2008	Ilona	Best Colombian Artist Website	Nominated
