= The Legends (Tejano band) =

American musical group

The Legends are a Tejano "supergroup" of senior Tejano musicians. Members are Carlos Guzmán, Freddie Martínez Sr., Sunny Ozuna, and Augustín Ramírez. The group's first album ¿Qué Es Música Tejana? (2000) won a Latin Grammy Award as Best Tejano Album in 2001, and the group were nominated again at Latin Grammy Awards of 2007 for Otra Vez Raices (2006).

== Discography ==
Albums

- ¿Qué Es Música Tejana? 2000
- Dos De Coleccion 2005
- Otra Vez Raices 2006
