= Lucía Pulido =

Colombian singer (born 1962)

Lucía Pulido (born March 22, 1962, in Bogotá) is a Colombian singer who since 1986 has sung traditional music such as cumbia, bullerengue and joropos. In 1994, she moved to New York, where she has performed traditional music and has sung with jazz musicians. She performed in Vienna with the experimental electronics musicians Christian Fennesz and Burkhard Stangl. In 2017, she appeared in Mexico City with Sofía Rei and Verónica Valerio in the Latin-American3 voces, 3 mujeres, 3 vanguardias.

== Biography ==
Born in Yopal in 1962, Lucía Pulido was the daughter of a guitar player who sang folk songs with his guitar every evening when he returned from work. In the 1980s, she began her professional career singing and recording duos with Iván Benavides, comprising traditional compositions and Latin jazz. In 1994, she moved to New York where she recorded many of her own songs, including “Lucía” (1996) and “Cantos religiosos y paganos” (2000).

In 2000, she received a grant from the Lower Manhattan Cultural Council Foundation and in 2007 and 2008 she was an artist in residence in Krems, Austria. By 2010, she was involved in various projects in New York and Latin America, including the Lucia Pulido Ensemble and experimental music based on traditional songs together with the Argentine guitarist Fernando Tarrés. In 2017, she appeared in Mexico City with Sofía Rei and Verónica Valerio in the Latin-American 3 voces, 3 mujeres, 3 vanguardias. Over the years, she has performed in Canada, the United States, Europe and South America. In 2006, the New York Times commented, "Ms Pulido holds on to the rawness of the original melodies while giving them a sophisticated new context".
