= Cuéntame (Rosario Flores album) =

Studio album by Rosario Flores
- Released: 17 November 2009
- Genre: Latin pop
- Label: Universal Music Latino

Rosario Flores chronology
Parte de Mí (2008)	Cuéntame (2009)	Raskatriski (2011)

Cuéntame is the ninth studio album released by Spanish singer Rosario Flores. It was released on 17 November 2009. The album contains the version of the song "Cuéntame" used as the main theme song of the 11th season of the Spanish television drama series Cuéntame cómo pasó. It was nominated for a Latin Grammy Award for Best Female Pop Vocal Album in 2010.

== Track listing ==
No.	Title	Writer(s)	Length
1.	"Cuéntame que te pasó (the Speak Up Mambo)"	Castellanos	3:24
2.	"Soy rebelde"	Alejandro; Magdalena	3:04
3.	"Il mio canto libero"	Battisti; Mogol	3:30
4.	"Pongamos que hablo de Madrid"	Sánchez; Sabina	3:20
5.	"Gracias a la vida"	Parra	3:44
6.	"La gata bajo la lluvia"	Pérez-Botija	3:11
7.	"Gwendolyne"	Iglesias	2:35
8.	"Quiero besarte"	Stivelberg; Rotenberg; Gutiérrez; Infante; Iglesias	3:34
9.	"El gato que está triste y azul"	Savio; Bigazzi	3:09
10.	"Todo es de color"	Molina	3:57
11.	"Todo cambia"	Numhauser	3:23
12.	"Cuéntame"	Armenteros	2:15
