= The Poor Old Lady (La Pobre viejecita) =

Fairy tale

The Poor Old Lady (La pobre viejecita) is a children's poem written by Colombian poet Rafael Pombo, first published in 1854 as part of his collection Cuentos pintados para niños (Painted Stories for Children). The work is one of the most recognized pieces of Colombian children's literature and has been included in numerous schoolbooks and poetry anthologies throughout Latin America. Its ironic tone and rhythmic structure have contributed to its lasting presence in popular memory.

== Plot of the story ==
The poem tells the story of an elderly woman who, despite having a large house, abundant food, and luxurious possessions, constantly laments her supposed poverty. Throughout the text, Pombo highlights the discrepancy between her material wealth and her perception of deprivation, reinforcing the satirical tone of the work. In the end, the "poor old lady" dies, leaving behind a considerable inheritance, and the poem concludes with an ironic remark: a wish that everyone may enjoy the same "poverty" she endured.

== Characters ==
The story revolves around a unique character, the poor old lady, which is based on a commonly known social stereotype.

== Commentary ==
Similar to Rafael Pombo's other tales and rhymes, "The Poor Old Lady" imparts lessons about human nature and societal behaviors. The story explores the themes of human greed and highlights that material possessions are not the most vital aspects of life.

The tale examines two fundamental human tendencies: Ingratitude and undervaluing one's possessions and a constant focus on what one lacks.

While many may view her as a greedy individual oblivious to her own abundance, it's conceivable that such an old lady might have explored various experiences throughout her life, reflecting a truly curious and perhaps insatiable nature.

== Verses ==
Érase una viejecita
sin nadita que comer
sino carnes, frutas, dulces,
tortas, huevos, pan y pez.

Bebía caldo, chocolate,
leche, vino, té y café,
y la pobre no encontraba
qué comer ni qué beber.

Y esta vieja no tenía
ni un ranchito en qué vivir
fuera de una casa grande
con su huerta y su jardín.

Nadie, nadie la cuidaba
sino Andrés y Juan Gil
y ocho criados y dos pajes
de librea y corbatín.

Nunca tuvo en qué sentarse
sino sillas y sofás
con banquitos y cojines
y resorte al espaldar.

Ni otra cama que una grande
más dorada que un altar,
con colchón de blanda pluma,
mucha seda y mucho holán.

Y esta pobre viejecita
cada año, hasta su fin,
tuvo un año más de vieja
y uno menos que vivir.

Y al mirarse en el espejo
la espantaba siempre allí
otra vieja de antiparras,
papalina y peluquín.

Y esta pobre viejecita
no tenía qué vestir
sino trajes de mil cortes
y de telas mil y mil.

Y a no ser por sus zapatos,
chanclas, botas y escarpín,
descalcita por el suelo
anduviera la infeliz.

Apetito nunca tuvo
acabando de comer,
ni gozó salud completa
cuando no se hallaba bien.

Se murió del mal de arrugas,
ya encorvada como un tres,
y jamás volvió a quejarse
ni de hambre ni de sed.

Y esta pobre viejecita
al morir no dejó más
que onzas, joyas, tierras, casas,
ocho gatos y un turpial.

Duerma en paz, y Dios permita
que logremos disfrutar
las pobrezas de esa pobre
y morir del mismo mal.

Once upon a time there was a little old lady
with nothing at all to eat
except various meats, fruits, sweets,
cakes, eggs, bread, and fish.

She drank broth, chocolate,
milk, wine, tea, and coffee,
yet the poor woman could not find
anything to eat or drink.

And this old woman possessed no humble abode
in which to dwell,
but lived in a grand house
complete with a garden and an orchard.

No one cared for her
except for Andrés and Juan Gil,
and eight servants along with two pages
adorned in livery and bow ties.

She had nothing else to sit upon
but chairs and sofas,
with little benches and cushions
and springs for support at their backs.

Her bed was no ordinary one—
it was a large one, more golden than an altar,
with a mattress stuffed with soft feathers,
abundant silk, and ample frills.

And this poor little old lady,
each year until her end,
gained one more year of age
and one year less to live.

When she gazed into the mirror,
it always startled her to behold
another old woman wearing spectacles,
a small hat and a toupee.

Moreover, this poor little old lady
had nothing to wear
except dresses fashioned in a thousand styles
and crafted from countless fabrics.

And were it not for her shoes—
flip-flops, boots, and dainty shoes—
she would have wandered the floor barefoot,
an unfortunate soul indeed.

She never found the appetite
once her meal was done,
nor did she ever enjoy full health
when she felt unwell.

She eventually succumbed to the "wrinkle disease,"
bent like the numeral three,
and never again uttered a complaint
of hunger or thirst.

When this poor little old lady died,
she left behind nothing
but measures of wealth, jewels, lands, houses,
eight cats, and a troupial.

May she rest in peace, and may God grant
that we, too, might somehow partake
in the poverty of that poor soul
and suffer the same ill.

— Rafael Pombo's version provided by Biblioteca Luis Ángel Arango

== Modern uses and adaptations ==
The Poor Old Lady remains one of the most recognized characters in Colombian culture, frequently appearing in elementary school textbooks, nursery rhymes, and children's literature compilations.

In 1977, Fernando Laverde produced an animated film adaptation of the story, considered to be one of the first animated films created in Colombia.

Representations of the character are featured in parades and carnivals. In recent years, theme parks such as Mundo Aventura and the Colombian National Coffee Park have incorporated animatronic versions of "The Poor Old Lady" into their attractions.
