= Allá en el Sur =

Allá En El Sur

Studio album by Ilona
- Released: February 12, 2008
- Recorded: February–March, 2007
- Genre: Latin pop, Rock en Español
- Label: EMI Latin
- Producer: Benny Faccone

Ilona chronology
| Desde Mi Ventana (2005) | Allá En El Sur (2008) |

Allá En El Sur ("Back in the South") is the second studio album released by Colombian singer-songwriter Ilona on February 12, 2008. The album received a nomination for a Latin Grammy Award for Best Female Pop Vocal Album at the 8th Latin Grammy Awards, losing to Yo Canto by Italian performer Laura Pausini.

== Track listing ==
The track listing from Allmusic.

| No. | Title | Writer(s) | Length |
|---|---|---|---|
| 1. | "Yo Me Voy" | Ilona | 3:34 |
| 2. | "Hoy No" | Ilona, Richard Narváez | 4:13 |
| 3. | "Mariposas" | Ilona | 4:46 |
| 4. | "Allá en el Sur" | Ilona, Narváez | 4:34 |
| 5. | "Ser Tan Solo" | Ilona, Narváez | 3:35 |
| 6. | "Por Ti" | Ilona | 3:42 |
| 7. | "Dónde Está el Amor" | Ilona | 3:31 |
| 8. | "Extraños" | Ilona | 4:13 |
| 9. | "Yo Soy" | Ilona, Narváez | 3:34 |
| 10. | "En Este Lugar" | Ilona | 3:41 |
| 11. | "Cuanto Todo Se Acabe" | Narváez | 4:57 |
