= 8th Annual Latin Grammy Awards =

Music awards presented Nov 2007

8th Latin Grammy Awards
- Date: November 8, 2007
- Venue: Mandalay Bay Events Center, Paradise, Nevada
- Hosted by: Eugenio Derbez and Lucero

Highlights
- Person of the Year: Juan Luis Guerra

Television/radio coverage
- Network: Univision

The 8th Annual Latin Grammy Awards took place on Thursday, November 8, 2007, at the Mandalay Bay Events Center in Las Vegas, Nevada. The show aired on Univision. Juan Luis Guerra was the night's big winner, winning 5 awards including Album of the Year. Juan Luis Guerra was honored as the Latin Recording Academy Person of the Year one night prior to the telecast.

== Awards ==
Winners are in bold text.

=== General ===
Record of the Year

Juan Luis Guerra — "La Llave de Mi Corazón"

- Beyoncé featuring Shakira — "Bello Embustero"
- Miguel Bosé featuring Paulina Rubio — "Nena"
- Gustavo Cerati — "La Excepcion"
- Ricky Martin featuring La Mari and Tommy Torres — "Tu Recuerdo"

Album of the Year

Juan Luis Guerra — La Llave de mi Corazón

- Miguel Bosé — Papito
- Calle 13 — Residente o Visitante
- Ricky Martin — MTV Unplugged
- Alejandro Sanz — El Tren de los Momentos

Song of the Year

Juan Luis Guerra — "La Llave De Mi Corazón"

- Belinda, Kara DioGuardi and Nacho Peregrin — "Bella Traición" (Belinda)
- Fher Olvera — "Labios Compartidos" (Maná)
- Franco De Vita — "Tengo"
- Mario Domm — "Todo Cambió" (Camila)

Best New Artist

Jesse & Joy

- Alejandra Alberti
- Dafnis Prieto
- Tulsa
- Ricky Vallen

=== Pop ===
Best Female Pop Vocal Album

Laura Pausini — Yo Canto

- Ana Belén — Anatomía
- Belinda — Utopía
- Shaila Dúrcal — Recordando...
- Ilona — Allá En El Sur

Best Male Pop Vocal Album

Ricky Martin — MTV Unplugged

- Miguel Bosé — Papito
- Andrés Cepeda — Para Amarte Mejor
- Franco De Vita — Mil y Una Historias En Vivo
- Aleks Syntek — Lección de Vuelo

Best Pop Album by a Duo/Group with Vocals

La Quinta Estación — El Mundo Se Equivoca

- Jarabe de Palo — Adelantando
- Jesse & Joy — Esta Es Mi Vida
- Miranda! — El Disco de Tu Corazón
- Porpartes — Solo Paz

=== Urban ===
Best Urban Music Album

Calle 13 — Residente O Visitante

- Daddy Yankee — El Cartel: The Big Boss
- Orishas — Antidiotico
- Ivy Queen — Sentimiento
- Mala Rodríguez - Malamarismo

Best Urban Song

Eduardo Cabra, Panasuyo and Rene Perez — "Pal Norte" (Calle 13 featuring Orishas)

- Mathieu and Orishas — "Hay Un Son" (Orishas)
- will.i.am, Daddy Yankee and Fergie — "Impacto" (Daddy Yankee featuring Fergie)
- Don Omar and Eliel — "No Se De Ella (My Space)" (Don Omar featuring Wisin & Yandel)
- Tres Coronas and Michael Stuart — "Mi Tumbao (Remix)".

=== Rock ===
Best Rock Solo Vocal Album

Fito Páez — El Mundo Cabe En Una Canción

- Belo y Los Susodichos — Pisando Lo Fregao
- Iván Ferreiro — Las Siete y Media
- Rosendo Mercado — El Endemico Embustero y El Incauto Pertinaz
- Ariel Rot — Dúos, Tríos y Otras Perversiones

Best Rock Album by a Duo/Group with Vocals

Los Rabanes — Kamikaze

- Attaque 77 — Karmagedon
- Bengala — Bengala
- La Renga — TruenoTierra
- Panda — Amantes Sunt Amentes

Best Rock Song

Gustavo Cerati — "La Excepción"

- Bruno Bressa, Chalo Galván and Gerardo Galván — "Monitor" (Volován)
- Panda — "Narcisista por excelencia"
- Gustavo Napoli — "Oscuro Diamante" (La Renga)
- Roberto Musso — "Yendo A La Casa De Damián" (El Cuarteto de Nos)

=== Alternative ===
Best Alternative Music Album

Aterciopelados — Oye

- Kevin Johansen — Logo
- Kinky — Reina
- Vicentico — Los Pajaros
- Zoé — Memo Rex Commander y el Corazón Atómico de la Vía Láctea

Best Alternative Song

Manu Chao — "Me Llaman Calle"

- Kevin Johansen — "Anoche Soñé Contigo"
- Héctor Buitrago and Andrea Echeverri — "Complemento" (Aterciopelados)
- Vicentico — "El Arbol de la Plaza"
- León Larregui and Zoé — "No Me Destruyas" (Zoé)

=== Tropical ===
Best Salsa Album

El Gran Combo de Puerto Rico — Arroz con Habichuela

- Willy Chirino — 35 Aniversario: En Vivo
- Issac Delgado — En Primera Plana
- Andy Montañez — El Godfather de La Salsa
- Tito Nieves — Canciones Clásicas de Marco Antonio Solís

Best Merengue Album

Juan Luis Guerra — La Llave de mi Corazón

- Elvis Crespo — Regreso el Jefe
- Limi-T 21 — Real Time
- Kinito Mendez — Con Sabor A Mi
- Toño Rosario — A Tu Gusto

Best Cumbia/Vallenato Album

Jorge Celedón and Jimmy Zambrano — Son...Para El Mundo

- Checo Acosta — Checazos de Carnaval 3
- Binomio de Oro de América — Impredecible
- Alfredo Gutiérrez — El Más Grande con Los Grandes
- Peter Manjarrés and Sergio Luis Rodríguez — El Papá de Los Amores

Best Contemporary Tropical Album

Oscar D'León — Fuzionando

- Albita — Live At The Colony Theater
- Aventura — K.O.B. Live
- Richie Ray & Bobby Cruz — A Lifetime Of Hits... Live At Centro De Bellas Artes, San Juan, Puerto Rico
- Nino Segarra — De Nino A Nino: Homenaje A Nino Bravo

Best Traditional Tropical Album

Bobby Cruz — Románticos De Ayer, Hoy y Siempre

- Francisco Céspedes and Gonzalo Rubalcaba — Con El Permiso de Bola
- Ibrahim Ferrer — Mi Sueño
- La Charanga Cubana — A Comer Chicharrón
- Alfredo Valdés Jr. — De La Habana a Nueva York

Best Tropical Song

Juan Luis Guerra — "La Llave de Mi Corazón"

- Doejo and Juan José Hernández — "Arroz con Habichuela" (El Gran Combo de Puerto Rico)
- Yoel Henriquez and Jorge Luis Piloto — "La Mujer Que Más Te Duele" (Issac Delgado featuring Víctor Manuelle)
- José Gaviria Escobar — "No Te Pido Flores" (Fanny Lú)

=== Singer-Songwriter ===
Best Singer-Songwriter Album

Caetano Veloso — Cê

- Jorge Drexler — 12 Segundos de Oscuridad
- Amaury Gutiérrez — Pedazos de Mí
- José Luis Perales — Navegando Por Ti
- Silvio Rodríguez — Érase Que Se Era

=== Regional Mexican ===
Best Ranchero Album

Pepe Aguilar — Enamorado

- Cristian Castro — El Indomable
- Pedro Fernández — Escúchame
- Vicente Fernández — La Tragedia del Vaquero
- Pablo Montero — Que Bonita Es Mi Tierra... y sus Canciones

Best Banda Album

Los Horóscopos de Durango — Desatados

- Alacranes Musical — Ahora y Siempre
- Banda Machos — A Pesar De Todo
- Graciela Beltrán — Promesas No
- Valentín Elizalde y su Banda Guasaveña — Lobo Domesticado
- Grupo Montéz de Durango — ¡Agárrese!

Best Grupero Album

Grupo Bryndis — Sólo Pienso En Ti

- Caballo Dorado — Cabalgando En Las Canciones de Joan Sebastian
- Víctor García — Arráncame
- Los Acosta — Siluetas
- Los Ángeles de Charly — Un Tiempo, Un Estilo, Un Amor

Best Tejano Album

Los Palominos — Evoluciones

- La Tropa F — Exitos de Combate
- The Legends (Tejano band) — Otra Vez Raices
- Joe Lopez and Jimmy González & El Grupo Mazz for Mazz Live Reunion - The Last Dance
- David Marez — Corazón de Oro
- Joe Posada — Despacito

Best Norteño Album

Michael Salgado — En Vivo

- Conjunto Primavera — El Amor Que Nunca Fue
- Intocable — Crossroads — Cruce De Caminos
- Pesado — Piénsame Un Momento
- Siggno — Capítulo 5

Best Regional Mexican Song

Freddie Martinez, Sr. — "A Las Escondidas" (Joe Lopez featuring Jimmy González & El Grupo Mazz)

- Edgar Cortazar and Mark Portmann — "¿Cómo Quieres Que Te Olvide?" (Pedro Fernández)
- Carlos Alberto Agundiz — "Él No Eres Tú" (Los Horóscopos de Durango)
- Teodoro Bello — "La Tragedia del Vaquero" (Vicente Fernández)
- Edgar Cortazar, Adrián Pieragostino and José Luis Terrazas — "Me Duele Escuchar Tu Nombre" (Grupo Montéz de Durango)
- Mauricio L. Arriaga and Eduardo Murguia — "Por Amarte" (Pepe Aguilar)
- Luis "Louie" Padilla — "Por Ella (Poco a Poco)" (Intocable)

=== Instrumental ===
Best Instrumental Album

Chick Corea and Béla Fleck — The Enchantment

- Ray Barretto — Standards Rican-ditioned
- Ed Calle — In The Zone
- Carlos Franzetti Trio — Live In Buenos Aires
- Hamilton de Holanda Quintet — Brasilianos

=== Traditional ===
Best Folk Album

Los Gaiteros de San Jacinto — Un Fuego de Sangre Pura

- Los Muñequitos de Matanzas — Tambor De Fuego
- Mariza — Concerto em Lisboa
- Sones de México Ensemble Chicago — Esta Tierra Es Tuya (This Land is Your Land)

Best Tango Album

Raul Jaurena — Te Amo Tango

- Luisa Maria Güell — Una
- Rodolfo Mederos Orquesta Típica — Comunidad
- Vayo — Tango Legends

Best Flamenco Album

Ojos de Brujo — Techarí

- Calima — Azul
- Juan Carmona — Sinfonia Flamenca
- Miguel Poveda — Tierra De Calma
- Son De La Frontera — Cal

=== Jazz ===
Best Latin Jazz Album

Arturo Sandoval — Rumba Palace

- Michel Camilo and Tomatito — Spain Again
- Michel Camilo — Spirit of the Moment
- Paquito D'Rivera Quintet — Funk Tango
- Chucho Valdés — Keys of Latin Jazz

=== Christian ===
Best Christian Album (Spanish Language)

Marcos Witt — Alegría

- Blest — Palabras del Alma
- Daniel Calveti — Un Día Más
- Pablo Olivares — Voy A Entregar Mi Corazón
- Pamela — En Español
- Paulina Aguirre — Mujer de Fe
- Rojo — Con el Corazón en la Mano

Best Christian Album (Portuguese Language)

Aline Barros — Caminho De Milagres

- Padre Juarez de Castro — Deus Está Aqui
- Eyshila — Até Tocar O Céu
- Cristina Mel — Um Novo Tempo
- Robinson Monteiro — Uma Nova História
- Oficina G3 — Oficina Elektracustika G3

=== Brazilian ===
Best Brazilian Contemporary Pop Album

Lenine — Acústico MTV

- Zeca Baleiro — Baladas do Asfalto & Outros Blues ao Vivo
- Carlinhos Brown — A Gente Ainda Não Sonhou
- Pedro Mariano — Pedro Mariano
- Paulo Ricardo — Prisma
- Ivete Sangalo — Multishow ao Vivo: Ivete no Maracanã
- Skank — Carrossel

Best Brazilian Rock Album

Lobão — Acústico MTV

- Capital Inicial — Eu Nunca Disse Adeus
- CPM 22 — MTV ao Vivo CPM 22
- Mutantes — Ao Vivo — Barbican Theatre, Londres 2006
- NX Zero — NX Zero

Best Samba/Pagode Album

Zeca Pagodinho — Acústico MTV 2 Gafieira

- Jorge Aragão — E Aí?
- Beth Carvalho — 40 Anos de Carreira: Ao Vivo no Teatro Municipal Vol. 2
- Martinho da Vila — Do Brasil e do Mundo
- Mart'nália — Mart'nália em Berlim ao Vivo

Best MPB Album

Leny Andrade and Cesar Camargo Mariano — Ao Vivo

- Gal Costa — Ao Vivo
- Guinga — Casa de Villa
- Zé Ramalho — Parceria dos Viajantes
- Monica Salmaso — Noites de Gala, Samba na Rua

Best Romantic Music Album

Cauby Peixoto — Eternamente Cauby Peixoto: 55 Anos de Carreira

- Bruno & Marrone — Ao Vivo em Goiânia
- Wanderley Cardoso — 40 Años de Sucesso do Bom Rapaz: Ao Vivo
- Zezé Di Camargo & Luciano — Diferente
- Fábio Jr. — Minhas Canções

Best Brazilian Roots/Regional Album

Daniela Mercury — Balé Mulato - Ao Vivo

- Dominguinhos — Conterrâneos
- Margareth Menezes — Brasileira - Ao Vivo
- Sérgio Reis — Tributo a Goiá
- Naná Vasconcelos — Trilhas

Best Brazilian Song

Caetano Veloso — "Não Me Arrependo"

- Miro Almeida, Dória and Duller — "Berimbau Metalizado" (Ivete Sangalo)
- Simone Guimarães and Francis Hime — "Carta á Amiga Poeta" (Simone Guimarães)
- Arnaldo Antunes and Adriana Calcanhotto — "Para Lá" (Arnaldo Antunes)
- Antônio Villeroy — "Rosas" (Ana Carolina)

=== Children's ===
Best Latin Children Album

Voz Veis — Cómo Se Llega A Belén

- Acalanto — Vida Dde Bebê
- Miguelito — Más Grande Que Tú
- Zé Renato and Convidados — Forró Prás Crianças
- Strings For Kids — El Sueño del Elefante

=== Classical ===
Best Classical Album

John Neschling — Beethoven Abertura Consagração da Casa Sinfonia Nº 6
Montserrat Caballé — La Canción Romántica Española

- Southwest Chamber Music — Carlos Chávez: Complete Chamber Music Volume 4
- Rolando Villazón — Gitano
- Clara Sverner — Mozart Volume 3

=== Recording Package ===
Best Recording Package

Catalina Díez — Los Vallenatos de Andrés (Various Artists)

- Luciano Cury — Mutantes Ao Vivo - Barbican Theatre, Londres 2006 (Mutantes)
- Gringo Cardia — Biograffiti (Rita Lee)
- Andrea Bardasano — Edición Especial (Motel)
- Allan Castañeda and Sandra Masias — Serenata Inkaterra (Jean Pierre Magnet)

=== Production ===
Best Engineered Album

Allan Leschhorn, Luis Mansilla, Ronnie Torres and Adam Ayan — La Llave de mi Corazón (Juan Luis Guerra)

- Mario Breuer, Gustavo "Pichon" dal Pont, Javier Garza and Giovanni Versari — A Tu Lado (Juan Fernando Velasco)
- Álvaro Alencar and Ricardo Garcia — Acústico MTV (Lenine)
- Jay Ashby, Jay Dudt and Hollis Greathouse — Especiaria (Flavio Chamis)
- Gil Cerezo, Carlos Chairez, Omar Gongora, Ulises Lozano and Cesar Pliego — Reina (Kinky)

Producer of the Year

Sebastian Krys

- Benny Faccone
- Carlos Jean
- Cachorro Lopez
- Phil Vinall and Zoé

=== Music video ===
Best Short Form Music Video

Voz Veis — "Ven A Mi Casa Esta Navidad"

- Calle 13 — "Tango del Pecado"
- Kevin Johansen — "Anoche Soñé Contigo"
- Maná — "Labios Compartidos"
- Orishas — "Hay Un Son"

Best Long Form Music Video

Ricky Martin — MTV Unplugged

- Chico Buarque — A Série
- Andrés Calamaro — Made in Argentina 2005
- Franco De Vita — Mil y Una Historias En Vivo
- Ivete Sangalo — Multishow ao vivo: Ivete no Maracanã

=== Special awards ===
Lifetime Achievement Awards

- Alberto Cortez
- Lucho Gatica
- Olga Guillot
- Os Paralamas do Sucesso
- Los Tigres del Norte
- Chavela Vargas

Trustees Awards

- Joao Araujo
- Leopoldo Federico.
- Fernando Hernández

== Performers ==
- Ricky Martin Featuring Blue Man Group — "Lola, Lola / La Bomba" — 05:42
- Pepe Aguilar — "Por Amarte / 100% Méxicano" — 04:39
- Daddy Yankee — "Ella Me Levantó" — 04:04
- Camila — "Todo Cambió" — 02:35
- Jesse & Joy — "Espacio Sideral" — 02:36
- Shaila Dúrcal — "Amor Eterno" — 04:52
- La Quinta Estación And Aleks Syntek — "Me Muero / Intocable" — 04:26
- Intocable — "Te Lo Juro" — 04:11
- Orishas And Calle 13 — "Hay Un Son / Pal Norte" — 05:56
- Alacranes Musical Featuring Kinky — "Sin Tú Amor" — 03:32
- Laura Pausini And Andrea Bocelli — "Dispárame, Dispara / Vive Ya" — 06:07
- Ivy Queen — "Que Lloren" — 03:36
- Conjunto Primavera — "¡Basta Ya!" — 03:24
- Miguel Bosé Featuring Bimba Bosé — "Como un Lobo" — 03:34
- Juan Luis Guerra 440 Featuring Sheila E. — "La Travesia" — 04:10

== Presenters ==
- Sofía Vergara and Pablo Montero — presented Best Norteño Album
- Bárbara Mori and Eduardo Verástegui — presented Best Pop Vocal Album, Duo or Group
- Alessandra Rosaldo and Wisin & Yandel — presented Best Merengue Album
- Erika Buenfil and Sergio Goyri — presented Best Banda Album
- Dayanara Torres and Benjamin Bratt — presented Best Urban Music Album
- Los Tigres del Norte — presented Best Pop Vocal Album, Female
- Aventura — presented Record of the Year
- Willy Chirino, Vicky Terrazas and Marisol Terrazas — presented Best Ranchero Album
- Patricia Navidad and Pau Dones — presented Best New Artist
- Gloria Estefan — presented People of the Year
- Karla Álvarez, Elvis Crespo and Pedro Fernández — presented Best Urban Song
- Wilmer Valderrama and Angélica Vale — presented Best Pop Vocal Album, Male
- Kate del Castillo and Rubén Blades — presented Album of the Year
- Nora Salinas and Sergio Mayer — presented Best Alternative Music Album
- Mala Rodríguez and Eduardo Capetillo — presented Song of the Year
