= KJ Denhert =

- Born: Karen Jeannne Denhert; 1958 (age 67–68); New York, New York
- Genres: Urban folk, jazz
- Occupations: Singer, musician
- Instrument: Guitar
- Years active: 1980s–present
- Labels: Mother Cyclone, Motéma Music
- Website: kjdenhert.com

Karen Jeannne Denhert is a Grenadan-American urban folk-jazz artist who has won four Independent Music Award nominations and was named as one of the best female vocalists of 2009 by Jazz.com. Denhert was a winner in the Kerrville New Folk Song contest in June 2006 for "Private Angel," and won the Mountain Stage New Song contest in August 2005 with "Little Mary." Another Year Gone By, Live won the 2006 Independent Music Award for Best Live Performance. Her song "Choose Your Weapon" also went on to win Best Social Action Song at the 10th Annual Independent Music Awards. In 2015, Karen's song "Beautiful" won the "Jazz With Vocals" category at The 14th Annual Independent Music Awards.

== Biography ==
Karen Jeannne was the first Denhert born an American citizen; her older brother was born in Aruba. She was born in New York City and raised in The Bronx. She attended the Bronx High School of Sciences, and then went on to study Psychology at Cornell University. She cites her primary influences as James Taylor and Joni Mitchell, but also Sergio Mendes, John Hartford, Carole King, Laura Nyro, Steely Dan, and Hubert Laws. In the 1980s, she played lead guitar and occasionally sang for an all-female rock band called Fire, which toured North America and Europe. She then worked as a financial analyst for Dannon in Cleveland, Ohio, where she started her record label, Mother Cyclone. She returned to New York in 1997, where she formed her current band, NY Unit.

== Discography ==
- Looking Forward, Looking Back (1999)
- Live (2001)
- Girl Like Me (2003)
- The Song Writers Notebook (with Adam Falcon)
- Another Year Gone By
- Lucky 7
- Dal Vivo a Umbria Jazz
- Choose Your Weapon
- Album No. 9
- Destiny E.P.
