= De Mil Colores (Rosario Flores album) =

Studio album by Rosario Flores
- Released: 18 November 2003
- Genre: Latin pop
- Label: Sony BMG
- Producer: Fernando Illán

Rosario Flores chronology
Muchas Flores (2001)	De Mil Colores (2003)	Contigo Me Voy (2005)

De Mil Colores (Of a Thousand Colors) is the seventh studio album released by Spanish performer Rosario Flores. It was released by Sony BMG on 18 November 2003. The album was produced by Fernando Illán and earned Flores a Latin Grammy Award for Best Female Pop Vocal Album.

== Track listing ==
This information adapted from Allmusic.

No.	Title	Writer(s)	Length
1.	"De Mil Colores"	Rosario Flores	4:04
2.	"Aguanta Ahí"	René Álvarez	3:31
3.	"Jura de Samba"	Carlinhos Brown	3:22
4.	"La Vida Es Sueño"	Benny Moré	3:15
5.	"Como Tú"	Flores	4:01
6.	"Vueltas"	Flores, Fernando Illan, Manu Lehman	3:31
7.	"Atado a Esa Mujer"	Alberto Moraga	3:57
8.	"En Mi Casa"	Antonio Carmona, Flores, Illan	3:29
9.	"Todo Vive en Mí - Eso Es Amor"	Flores	3:46
10.	"Los Tangos de Mi Abuela"	Lola Flores, Luis Gómez	3:57
11.	"Vivirás"	Flores, Illan	3:25
