= Mutantes Ao Vivo – Barbican Theatre, Londres 2006 =

Mutantes Ao Vivo - Barbican Theatre, Londres 2006

Live album by Os Mutantes
- Released: 2006
- Recorded: 2006
- Genre: Tropicalia, psychedelic rock
- Label: Sony BMG
- Producer: Sérgio Dias

Os Mutantes chronology
Tecnicolor (2000)	Mutantes Ao Vivo - Barbican Theatre, Londres 2006 (2006)	Haih Or Amortecedor (2009)

Mutantes Ao Vivo – Barbican Theatre, Londres 2006 is a live double CD and single DVD by the Brazilian band Os Mutantes. The album was recorded at the first Mutantes concert since 1978, at London's Barbican Arts Centre.

It was given a rating of 7.6 by Pitchfork.

== Track listing ==
=== CD 1 ===
1. "Dom Quixote" (Arnaldo Baptista/Rita Lee)
2. "Caminhante Noturno" (Arnaldo Baptista/Rita Lee)
3. "Ave Gengis Khan" (Arnaldo Baptista/Rita Lee/Sérgio Dias)
4. "Tecnicolor" (Arnaldo Baptista/Rita Lee/Sérgio Dias)
5. "Virginia" (Arnaldo Baptista/Rita Lee/Sérgio Dias)
6. "Cantor de Mambo" (Arnaldo Baptista/Rita Lee/Élcio Decário)
7. "El Justiciero" (Arnaldo Baptista/Rita Lee/Sérgio Dias)
8. "Baby" (Caetano Veloso/Versão: Mutantes)
9. "I'm Sorry Baby (Desculpe, Babe)" (Arnaldo Baptista/Rita Lee)
10. "Top Top" (Liminha/Arnaldo Baptista/Rita Lee/Sérgio Dias)
11. "Dia 36" (Johnny Dandurand/Arnaldo Baptista/Rita Lee/Sérgio Dias)

=== CD 2 ===
1. "Fuga nº II" (Arnaldo Baptista/Rita Lee/Sérgio Dias)
2. "Le Premier Bonheur du Jour" (Jean Renard/Frank Gerald)
3. "Dois Mil e Um" (Rita Lee/Tom Zé)
4. "Ave Lúcifer" (Arnaldo Baptista/Rita Lee/Élcio Decário)
5. "Balada do Louco" (Arnaldo Baptista/Rita Lee)
6. "I Feel a Little Spaced Out (Ando Meio Desligado)" (Arnaldo Baptista/Rita Lee/Sérgio Dias)
7. "A Hora e a Vez do Cabelo Nascer (Cabeludo Patriota)" (Liminha/Arnaldo Baptista/Rita Lee/Sérgio Dias)
8. "A Minha Menina" (Jorge Ben)
9. "Bat Macumba" (Gilberto Gil/Caetano Veloso)
10. "Panis et Circenses" (Gilberto Gil/Caetano Veloso)

== Line-Up ==
- Sérgio Dias: Guitars and vocals
- Arnaldo Baptista: Keyboards and vocals
- Dinho Leme: Drums
- Zélia Duncan: Vocals

with:

- Vinícius Junqueira: Bass
- Henrique Peters: Keyboards
- Vitor Trida: Keyboards, guitars, flute, viola caipira and bass
- Simone Soul: Percussion
- Esméria Bulgari: Backing vocals
- Fábio Recco: Backing vocals
- Devendra Banhart: Backing vocals on "Bat Macumba"
- Noah Georgeson: Backing vocals on "Bat Macumba"
