= Teodora Enache =

Romanian jazz singer, songwriter and lyricist (born 1967)

Teodora Enache-Brody (30 September 1967, Onești) is a Romanian jazz singer, songwriter and lyricist. She is considered one of Romania's foremost jazz vocalists.

Teodora Enache studied mathematics at Alexandru Ioan Cuza University in Iași graduating with honors in 1991, before deciding to move into music professionally. Her first high-profile public performance was in 1993 at the Sibiu Jazz Festival.

During her career, Teodora has collaborated with artists and musicians including Johnny Răducanu, Stanley Jordan, Benny Rietveld, Theodosii Spassov, Burton Greene, Lars Danielsson, Darius Brubeck, Cătălin Târcolea, Guido Manusardi, Ion Baciu Jr., Lucian Maxim, Marius Mihalache, Joca Perpignan, Călin Grigoriu, and Răzvan Suma.

== Career ==
Teodora's career spans over a period of more than 25 years. She used jazz and improvisation as a vehicle on her journey through various cultures and music genres (jazz, world music, gospel, African music, ethno-jazz, Romanian Doina, classical music, swing etc.).

As a graduate of the Mathematics University in Iasi, Romania, Teodora fondly remembers that ‘entering the world of jazz was like going into a jungle where my only weapon was my endless love of jazz and improvisation’. Inspired by her jazz idol, Ella Fitzgerald, Teodora makes her debut at the Sibiu Jazz Festival, Romania, in 1993.

For 10 years she studies in the Johnny Răducanu Jazz Academy, working with some of the best Romanian musicians. This is a formative time in her career. Ever since the beginnings, Johnny Răducanu was saying about her: ‘Teodora sings her heart out.’

After a few years, she discovers the music of the great Romanian singer Maria Tănase, who becomes her next idol. Teodora becomes the first artist to include a Doina - Romanian musical tune style, customary in Romanian peasant music - in a jazz concert. She becomes the pioneer of the ethno-jazz trend in Romania. The playfulness and easiness in crossing the boundaries of these two music genres starts to shape her personality.

This is the time when Teodora starts to build up a bridge between American and Romanian music. She takes on the mission of promoting the Romanian Doina worldwide and sing it on every stage she is invited to perform on, considering the Doina as the ‘Romanian blues’. From now on, her projects bring together artists of various ethnicities, making music about their Roots, with the help of jazz as an international music language.

Her project entitled ‘Back to my Roots’ is a success, and is followed by an extended European Tour as well as an American Tour (International House of Columbia University, New York; Kuumbwa Jazz Center, Santa Cruz; Arts Museum – Legion of Honor, San Francisco; Cal Tech University, Los Angeles and Corcoran Museum, Washington).

In 2004 Teodora is invited by the American Government to become a member of the International Visitor's Programme as the Cultural Romanian Ambassador to the USA.

She has performed in many jazz festivals all over the world, alongside well-known jazz musicians:

· Montreux Jazz Festival, with Grammy nominee guitarist Stanley Jordan

· Panama International Festival for the Grand Opening of the Panama Canal ceremonies

· Library of Congress

· Zuricher Theater, with Johnny Răducanu

· Iridium Club, New York, with Les Paul

· Romanian Athenaeum, with Stanley Jordan

· Lugano Jazz Festival, with Stanley Jordan

· Marciac Jazz Festival, with Stanley Jordan

· Bozar Hall, with Stanley Jordan

· Blues Alley, Washington, as the guest of Curtis Fuller

· Corcoran Museum, with Johnny Răducanu

Teodora continues her collaboration with a series of great jazz musicians such as: Benny Rietveld, Stanley Jordan, Theodosii Spassov, Lars Danielsson, Johnny Răducanu, Les Paul, Curtis Fuller, Eric Legnini, Phillippe Duchemin, Guido Manusardi, Daniele di Bonaventura, Ion Baciu, Al Copley etc.

In 2005 she recorded her first jazz DVD in the USA alongside Johnny Răducanu. It is entitled: ‘Jazz Made in Romania. Two icons of jazz - Teodora Enache & Johnny Răducanu’ and it receives the Award for the ‘Best Short Musical’ at the Poppy Jasper International Film Festival in the USA.

After 2013, Teodora has decided for a fresh approach in her career. It is during this period that she discovers that a deep connection unites us all, regardless of our different stories, origins, ethnicity, religion or political beliefs. She believes that above all our boundaries and human limitations there is something higher that brings us all together. She calls it ‘Our Common Root’. This whole introspection period leads to an immense desire to compose. So she starts writing music as well as writing about her experiences. All of her work is now centered on her belief that: ‘We actually have ONE SINGLE ROOT…. Through music, we find that common root, our source of energy.’

During this period, she turns to poet Kahlil Gibran for inspiration and starts writing the music for his lyrics.

This is how ”The Prophet” project is born. The music, as well as the entire vision for the show, bear Teodora's signature. The performance is graced by actress Oana Pellea, who gladly partners with Teodora on this project.

In the same time, the artist continues to take on other projects as well, alongside remarkable musicians from all over the world. Teodora and Benny Rietveld (9-time Grammy Award winner, Miles Davis’ former bass player, and currently Carlo Santana's bassist and musical director) along with his quintet organize a tour entitled ‘Transfiguration’. The success of this project leads to the birth of an album with the same name. The recordings for this CD take place in Las Vegas and the famous ‘Abbey Road Studios’ in London.

On her plane journey back from Las Vegas, after a very intense recording session, Teodora comes up with the idea for an original new album based on the works of the Hungarian composer Bela Bartók. Half an year later she teams up with Theodosii Spassov (the great Bulgarian kaval artist) and records an album entitled ‘Incantations – Homage To Bela Bartók’. This project is a world premiere, as this is the first time Bartók's music is played in a jazz key.

Between 2016 and 2018 she takes on the role of artistic director of the Bucharest International Jazz Festival. Talented musicians are invited to join the festival, to the delight of the audience. Teodora introduces new projects for the younger generation of musicians, giving them the chance to take part in a variety of workshops.

In 2017 the artist moves to Germany. She continues on her exploration journey. Music starts to reveal its deeper meaning. In 2018 she records a new album at the Art of June Studios in Germany. The CD is called ‘Sound of the ROOT’, which includes an original interpretation of the 1st and 2nd Romanian Rhapsodies by George Enescu, and it will be released in 2019.

This is the moment when she first approaches the music composed by George Enescu – an encounter which gives rise to a world premiere. It is for the first time ever when Enescu's Romanian Rhapsodies – included in their repertoire by the most important orchestras worldwide – got a vocal version. The project entitled “From Classical to Jazz” was conceived by Teodora Enache. The two works received a modern, jazz interpretation and the musical arrangements were produced by Teodora and the guitarist Călin Grigoriu.

The concert conceived around Enescu's works was sold out 3 days before and it took place in the Great Hall of the Bucharest National Theater on September 9, 2019. Created especially for the 2019 edition of the “George Enescu” International Festival, the project featured Teodora Enache (voice), Călin Grigoriu (guitar), Joca Perpignan, from Israel, (percussion) and Răzvan Suma (cello) – as a special guest. Besides Enescu's Rhapsodies, the concert included also classical works like Bartók's Romanian Folk Dances, Beethoven's Moonlight Sonata, Bach's Air on a G String and Pachelbel's Canon.

== Awards ==
- 1993 - ‘Best New Artist Award’ - The International Sibiu Jazz Festival
- 2005 - Teodora and Johnny Răducanu receive the prize for the ‘Best Short Musical’ - Poppy Jasper International Film Festival, USA for their project ‘Jazz Made in Romania. Two icons of jazz’.
- 2007 & 2008 - Teodora is awarded the prize for the ‘Best International Jazz Contribution of a Romanian artist’ - the Romanian Radio Broadcasting Company.
- 2017 - the ‘Prophet’ is awarded the ‘Project of the Year Prize’ - the Jazz Awards Gala (Romania).
- 2018 & 2019 - Teodora receives the ‘Musician of the Year Award’ - the Jazz Awards Gala (Romania).

== Discography ==
- "Ballad of The Sensitive Plant", (Alpha Sound Production, Romania), 1997
- "X-treme" (în collaboration with Cătălin Târcolea), 1998
- "Jazz Behind The Carpathians: Johnny Raducanu Meets Teodora Enache" (Green Records, Romania) 1999
- "Meaning of Blue" (iQuest, Romania), 2000
- "Jazz Made In Romania" (Mediaround, USA), 2001
- "On The Sunny Side Of My Street" (A&A Records, Romania), 2001
- "Radacini / Back to My Roots" (Mediaround, USA), 2002
- "Teodora Enache Live, with Rick Condit & Ion Baciu Jr. Trio" (Soft Plus, Romania), 2004
- "Radacini – Shorashim" (Soft Records, Romania), 2007
- "Swing Me To The Moon" (Soft Records, Romania), 2007
- "Inside Stories - Jazz Poems" (TVR Media, Romania), 2006
- "A Child Is Born" (E Media, Romania), 2011
- "Looking In The Mirror" (E Media, Romania), 2012
- "Incantations : Homage to Bela Bartok" (E Media, Romania) 2016
- "Transfiguration" (Madman Junkyard, USA), 2016
- ”Sound of the Root” (Art of June Studios, Frankfurt, Germany) - to be released
- ”From Classical to Jazz” (Art of June Studios, Frankfurt, Germany) - to be released
- ”The Prophet” (Art of June Studios, Frankfurt, Germany) - to be released

== Testimonials ==
‘When I heard her for the first time I felt her energy straight in my heart, something only Ella Fitzgerald has made me feel.’ – Ahmet Ertegun, Founder of Atlantic Records

‘Teodora has a spiritual vision in music.’ – Benny Rietveld, 9-time Grammy Award winner, Santana’s Bass Player and Musical Director

‘Teodora is one of the few voices in the whole world that goes easily from the ethnical emission and improvisation to jazz improvisation. It’s a very special born talent that takes you smoothly from the world of Doina to the world of Blues, uniting both of them in a unique way.’ – Sergey Shishov, Creator and Host of ‘Pictures at an Exhibition’ Radio show on the Bulgarian National Radio

‘Teodora is such a powerful artist, mixing the deep sound of jazz and blues with that mystical sound coming from her roots. Her special vocal technique, coming from classical training, is perfect, she can moan like a black singer and then reach the highest pitch… So original and difficult to imitate. She is unique.’ – Heinz Hess, Jazz Producer at the ‘Art of June Studios’, Germany

‘Teodora’s voice has the passion of fire; her impressive vocal range touches the sky, but comes from the depths of her soul with great strength. Teodora’s music has spiritual dimensions.’ – Florian Lungu, Romanian Jazz critic

‘You are part of our family – you really sing from the bottom of your heart!’ – Johnny Griffin, American jazz tenor saxophonist, awarded the Honorary Doctorate of Music at Berklee College of Music

‘Keep an eye on her! She’s one of a kind!’ – Michel Bedin, Journalist at Jazz Hot Magazine

‘Teodora sings for life and for death.’ – Johnny Răducanu, jazz musician and composer, considered the ‘father’ of Romanian jazz

‘A black voice in white skin.’ – Elle Magazine

‘I will always remember the way she sang My Funny Valentine.’ – Curtis Fuller, American jazz trombonist, known as a member of Art Blakey‘s Jazz Messengers and contributor to many classic jazz recordings.

‘Teodora’s voice bears in the depths the pure black jazz, but also the incantations of the Doina… Due to her singing technique, Teodora’s voice rises as a ‘morning nightingale’ to heights that are almost impossible to reach, acquiring an ambitus similar to the range of a musical instrument.’ – Dan Priscornic, Teodora’s canto teacher
