= Ayelet Rose Gottlieb =

Israeli vocalist and composer

Ayelet Rose Gottlieb (Hebrew: איילת רוז גוטליב; born 1979) is an Israeli jazz and world music vocalist and composer based in Montreal.

== Biography ==
Ayelet Rose Gottlieb was born in Jerusalem. Her father and uncle were guitarists. Her grandfather was a carpenter born in Mandatory Palestine who spoke Hebrew and Arabic. She credits her grandfather for introducing her to Arabic and Middle Eastern music, her father for introducing her to Western classical music and jazz, and her uncle for introducing her to 1970s rock and pop music. She graduated from New England Conservatory of Music in 2002.

She currently lives in Montreal.

== Career ==
Gottlieb has performed at Carnegie Hall, the Guggenheim Museum, the Montreal International Jazz Festival, and numerous other venues. She has performed with Bobby McFerrin, Ethel, Joe Lovano, Naomi Shihab Nye, and many other musicians and poets. Gottlieb, Malika Zarra, Sofia Rei, and Sara Serpa were the four singers of the John Zorn-led vocal ensemble Mycale.

Gottlieb is affiliated with the Deep Listening movement associated with Pauline Olivieros. She founded "Orchard of Pomegranates," a collaborative musical community, in 2019.

== Discography ==
=== As leader ===
- Internal/External (2004)
- Mayim Rabim (2006)
- Upto Here | From Here (2009)
- Betzidei Drachim (Roadsides) (2014)
- Shiv'a (2016)
- Pneuma (2019)
- I Carry Your Heart: A Tribute To Arnie Lawrence (2019)
- 13 Lunar Meditations: Summoning the Witches (2021)

=== Collaborations ===
- Mycale: Mycale: The Book of Angels, Vol 13 (2010)
- Mycale: Gomory: The Book of Angels, Vol 25 (2015)
- Anat Fort and Ayelet Rose Duo: Two More Dreams (2017)
- Saku Mantere: Upon First Impression (2022)
- Ruth Saphir: Accolades of Time (2024)
- Dream Keepers: Dust (2025)
