= Tomás Doncker =

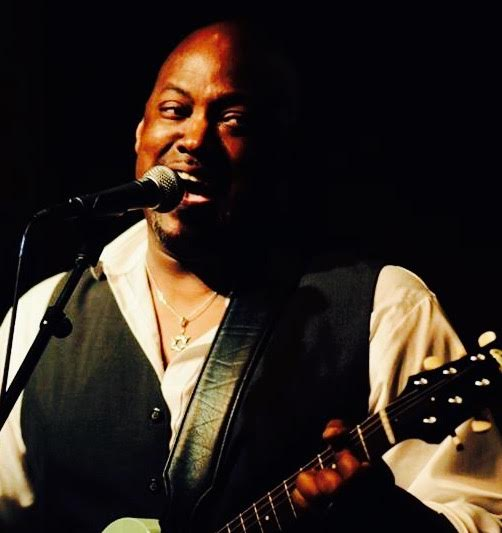

Background information
- Origin: New York City, United States
- Genres: Blues, R&B, Rock
- Occupation: Musician
- Instruments: Guitar, Vocals, Bass
- Years active: 1979–present
- Label: True Groove Records

Tomás Doncker is an American musician, and the CEO of True Groove Records. In 2011 CNN credited him with creating a new genre, Global Soul. He is best known as the lead guitarist in James Chance and the Contortions.

== Career ==
Doncker cut his teeth as a guitarist with New York No Wave acts including James Chance & The Contortions, Defunkt and J. Walter Negro & The Loose Jointz among others. He is noted for touring and recording with Japanese jazz musicians Sadao Watanabe and Masabumi Kikuchi. This led to him to producing studio and songwriting sessions with Bootsy Collins, Yoko Ono, and The Itals.

Doncker has worked with artists including Madonna, Ivan Neville, Bonnie Raitt, Meshell Ndegeocello, Corey Glover of Living Colour, former Parliament Funkadelic keyboardist Amp Fiddler, Grammy winning producer/bassist Bill Laswell, Chocolate Genius, and 2016 Grammy award nominee Shemekia Copeland. His ongoing collaborations with Pulitzer Prize-winning poet Yusef Komunyakaa have received massive critical acclaim. He has produced hundreds of records for independent musicians. He is the founder and CEO True Groove Records.

In recent years Doncker has completed successful Chinese and European tours as a solo musician. He has also performed at the Geraldine R. Dodge Poetry Festival, Milwaukee Summerfest, and New York Summerstage. With James Chance and the Contortions he played six sold out shows at The Blue Note Tokyo in January 2016.

Doncker was recently invited to support Fun Lovin’ Criminals on their extensive tour throughout the UK and Europe alongside his band, The True Groove All-Stars, which include members of The Specials Horns.

== Discography ==
- Inside Out (2007)
- Small World Part 1 (2008)
- Power of the Trinity (2011)
- Howlin' Wolf EP" (2014)
- Power of the Trinity... A Slight Return (The Global Soul Mixtape Vol. 1) (2014)
- Moanin' At Midnight: The Howlin' Wolf Project (2014)
- Big Apple Blues (2014)
- The Mess We Made (2015)
- Hard Is Hard (2025)
