= Rafael Pombo =

Colombian poet (1833–1912)

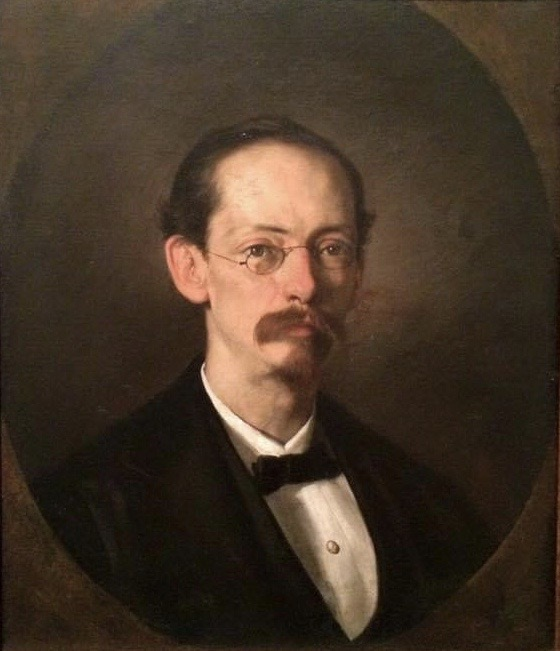
- Image of José Rafael de Pombo y Rebolledo
- Born: José Rafael de Pombo y Rebolledo; 7 November 1833; Bogotá, Republic of New Granada
- Died: 5 May 1912 (aged 78); Bogotá, Colombia
- Occupation: Poet
- Writing career
- Literary movement: Romanticism

José Rafael de Pombo y Rebolledo (November 7, 1833 – May 5, 1912) was a Colombian poet born in Bogotá. Trained as a mathematician and an engineer in a military school, Rafael Pombo served in the army and he traveled to the United States of America as Secretary of the Legation in Washington. After completing his diplomatic assignment, he was hired by D. Appleton & Company in New York to translate into Spanish nursery rhymes from the Anglo-Saxon oral tradition. The product of this work, more than a translation, was a transformative adaptation published in two books under the titles Cuentos pintados para niños and Cuentos morales para niños formales.

In spite of his extensive and diverse literary works, Rafael Pombo is mostly remembered for this contribution to children's literature. Among his most popular children's fables are Michín, Juan Chunguero, Pastorcita, La Pobre Viejecita, Simón el Bobito, El Gato Bandido, and El Renacuajo paseador.

After seventeen years in the United States of America, Rafael Pombo returned to Colombia, where he worked as a celebrated translator and journalist (founding several newspapers). On August 20, 1905 he was crowned as Colombia's best poet - his Poesías Completas was published in 1957, from which the poem En El Niágara was taken. Rafael Pombo remained in Colombia until his death on May 5, 1912.
