= Mycale (vocal ensemble) =

Music group

- Origin: New York
- Genres: Avant-garde
- Years active: 2010-present
- Label: Tzadik Records
- Members: Ayelet Rose Gottlieb; Sofia Rei; Sara Serpa; Malika Zarra
- Website: mycalevocal.com

Mycale is a group of four vocalists-arrangers assembled by John Zorn in 2009 to create original a cappella arrangements from his Book of Angels compositions. Composed of Ayelet Rose Gottlieb, Sofia Rei, Sara Serpa and Malika Zarra, Mycale sings texts in Hebrew, French, Spanish, Portuguese and Arabic from the Hebrew Bible, Rumi, Fernando Pessoa, and Heraclitus.

== Discography ==
- Gomory: Book of Angels Volume 25 (Tzadik Records 2015)
- Mycale: Book of Angels Volume 13 (Tzadik Records 2010)
