= Rin Rin the tadpole =

Character created by Colombian poet Rafael Pombo

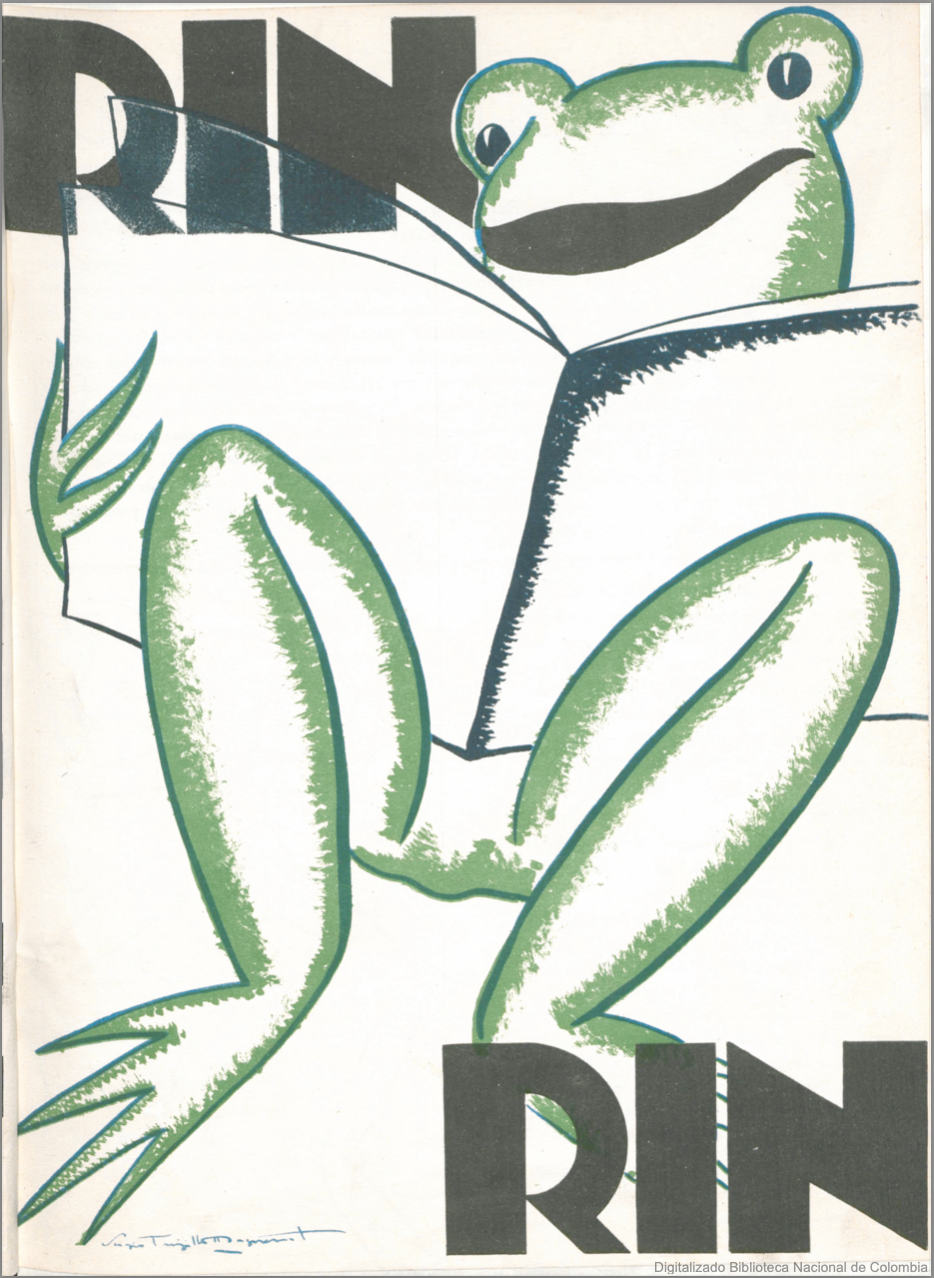
An illustration from Revista Rin Rin, a children's magazine published by the Colombian Ministry of Education.

Rin Rin the tadpole (Spanish: Rin Rin Renacuajo) is a stock character created by Colombian poet Rafael Pombo in his 1882 poem El renacuajo paseador (lit. 'The walking tadpole'). It is reprinted in compilations of children stories and nursery rhymes.

== History ==
Rin Rin the tadpole represents the stereotype of the self-assured youth, never listening to his elders; the original poem was meant to teach children to obey their mothers. He is depicted in an aristocratic dandy fashion ("With short pants, a stylish necktie, hat with ribbons and a wedding frock coat"). His mother (naturally, a frog) asks him not to leave the house, but he doesn't listen to her. The companions in his adventures are a young mouse ("el Niño Ratico"), and an old lady rat ("Doña Ratona"). They go around, partying and drinking beer. Finally, due to this misconduct, they end tragically, devoured by predators. The mouse and rat were eaten by cats, while the frog was devoured by a duck.

=== El renacuajo paseador (1882) ===
Original spanish

El hijo de rana, Rinrín renacuajo
Salió esta mañana muy tieso y muy majo
Con pantalón corto, corbata a la moda
Sombrero encintado y chupa de boda.

-¡Muchacho, no salgas!- le grita mamá
pero él hace un gesto y orondo se va.

Halló en el camino, a un ratón vecino
Y le dijo: -¡amigo!- venga usted conmigo,
Visitemos juntos a doña ratona
Y habrá francachela y habrá comilona.

-¡Ay! de mil amores lo hiciera, señora,
pero es imposible darle gusto ahora,
que tengo el gaznate más seco que estopa
y me aprieta mucho esta nueva ropa.
A poco llegaron, y avanza ratón,
Estírase el cuello, coge el aldabón,
Da dos o tres golpes, preguntan: ¿quién es?
-Yo doña ratona, beso a usted los pies

¿Está usted en casa? -Sí señor sí estoy,
y celebro mucho ver a ustedes hoy;
estaba en mi oficio, hilando algodón,
pero eso no importa; bienvenidos son.

Se hicieron la venia, se dieron la mano,
Y dice Ratico, que es más veterano :
Mi amigo el de verde rabia de calor,
Démele cerveza, hágame el favor.

Y en tanto que el pillo consume la jarra
Mandó la señora traer la guitarra
Y a renacuajo le pide que cante
Versitos alegres, tonada elegante.

-Lo siento infinito, responde tía rata,
aflójese un poco chaleco y corbata,
y yo mientras tanto les voy a cantar
una cancioncita muy particular.

Mas estando en esta brillante función
De baile y cerveza, guitarra y canción,
La gata y sus gatos salvan el umbral,
Y vuélvese aquello el juicio final

Doña gata vieja trinchó por la oreja
Al niño Ratico maullándole: ¡Hola!
Y los niños gatos a la vieja rata
Uno por la pata y otro por la cola

Don Renacuajito mirando este asalto
Tomó su sombrero, dio un tremendo salto
Y abriendo la puerta con mano y narices,
Se fue dando a todos noches muy felices

Y siguió saltando tan alto y aprisa,
Que perdió el sombrero, rasgó la camisa,
se coló en la boca de un pato tragón
y éste se lo embucha de un solo estirón

Y así concluyeron, uno, dos y tres
Ratón y Ratona, y el Rana después;
Los gatos comieron y el pato cenó,
¡y mamá Ranita solita quedó

English translation

Mrs. Frog’s son, Rinrin Tadpole
Came out this morning, very stiff and very handsome.
With shorts, trendy tie
fancy hat and wedding frock.

—“Boy, do not go out!” Mom screams at him.
But he makes a gesture and cockily goes.

And so they concluded, one, two and three
Mouse and mouse, and the tadpole later.
The cats ate and the duck had dinner,
and Mama Frog was left alone!

== Cultural references ==
Rin Rin is one of the most recognizable characters within Colombian culture, and is commonly used in elementary school textbooks, nursery rhymes and children literature compilations. Representations of the character are used in parades and carnivals. In recent years, the theme parks Mundo Aventura and Parque del Café have used animatronic versions of the tadpole.
