= Sofia Rei =

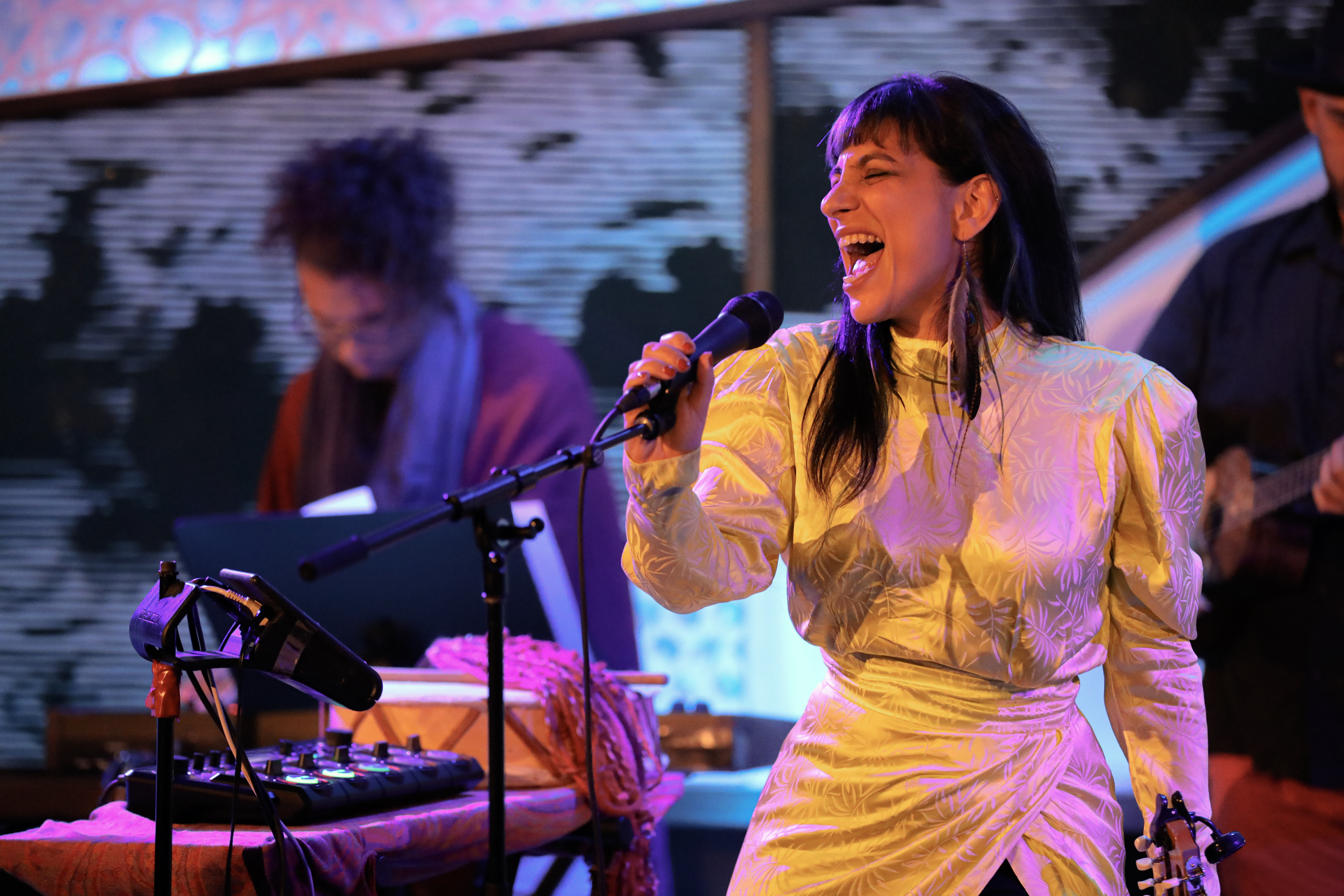
- Rei performing in 2021

Background information
- Born: Sofia Eugenia Koutsovitis Buenos Aires, Argentina
- Genres: Latin, experimental, alternative, world, jazz, electronic
- Occupations: Vocalist, songwriter, producer, educator
- Labels: World Village, Harmonia Mundi, Cascabelera, Tzadik GroundUP Music
- Website: sofiamusic.com

Sofia Eugenia Koutsovitis, known professionally as Sofia Rei, is an Argentine vocalist, songwriter, producer, and educator. A classically trained mezzo-soprano, Rei's influences include South American folk styles, jazz, pop, new classical and electronic music. Singing in Spanish, English and Portuguese, her voice was described by The Boston Globe as "possessing a voluptuously full voice, comprehensive command of Latin American rhythms, and encyclopedic knowledge of folkloric forms from Argentina, Peru, Colombia, and Uruguay." She was born and raised in Buenos Aires and has been based in New York since 2005.

Five of her albums won Independent Music Awards for Best Album, in the World Beat category and Concept Album. She has collaborated with John Zorn, Bobby McFerrin, Marc Ribot, Mike Patton, Maria Schneider and Susana Baca.

Her current work is rooted in Folk and Futurism, an expansive artistic vision that explores the relationship between ancestral traditions and forward-looking sonic innovation. This creative framework guides her 2026 album Antónima (Groundup Music), which continues her exploration of identity, mythology, and musical hybridity.

In addition to her creative practice, Sofía has helped build platforms that celebrate Latin American music and advocate for diversity in the arts, supporting the evolution and global visibility of these traditions. She co-founded collectives such as El Colectivo Sur and Ori-Gen, which brought together Latino artists in the diaspora to foster cultural exchange and expand the presence of South American art on the international stage. She also serves as a Professor at NYU Tisch’s Clive Davis Institute, where she teaches a range of courses, including two of her own design: New Perspectives in Latin Music, which explores rhythmic practice and the continent’s stylistic diversity, and The Creative Voice, a vocal improvisation and live looping course focused on experimentation and contemporary vocal performance. She teaches at Berklee College of Music's Global Initiatives, including its itinerant program Berklee Latino directed by Oscar Stagnaro and Javier Limón.

Rei’s projects have received support from institutions including Creative Capital, the New York Foundation for the Arts, Chamber Music America, National Association of Latino Arts and Culture, New Music USA, and the Mid Atlantic Arts Foundation. Her work continues to bridge cultural traditions and contemporary innovation.

== Early life and education ==
Rei was born in Buenos Aires to Andres Koutsovitis, a civil engineer, and Maria Cristina Reigadas, a philosopher, professor and researcher. She began to study music at 4, and as a child she sang with vocal groups and school choirs. She began her professional career at nine as a member of the Colón Teatro Children's Choir, and later joined Argentina's National Children's Choir at Teatro Nacional Cervantes.

Rei stopped performing professionally as she started high school at Colegio Nacional de Buenos Aires. She discovered punk rock, and started to play the drums, but sang mainly "in the shower." She returned to her formal music education in college as a voice major at the National Conservatory.

As an undergraduate, Rei studied opera with Professor Marta Blanco. In 1997, she joined the National Youth Choir of Argentina (CONAJO) under the direction of Maestro Nestor Zadoff, as a contralto. Her musical interests extended beyond the classical world, however, and she led "a double life" as a "properly educated classical singer during the day and everything else at night." At 19, she was exposed to jazz for the first time and began to learn about vocal improvisation, frequently working with young composers and exploring ways to use her voice as she premiered their new works. Fully immersed in improvised music and jazz, Rei decided to come to the United States to continue her education. In 2001, she moved to Boston to study jazz and improvisation at the New England Conservatory of Music. There, her teachers included Charlie Banacos, Danilo Perez, Dominique Eade, Steve Lacy, Bob Moses and Jerry Bergonzi. Encouraged by one of her teachers, George Russell, Rei began to write her own music. While at the conservatory, she met bassist Jorge Roeder, with whom she frequently collaborates. She graduated from the New England Conservatory with a Master's in Jazz and Improvisation in 2003.

== Career ==
In 2003, while living in Boston, Rei, Roeder, and drummer "Coqui" Perez-Albela formed Avantrio to explore the music of Peruvian composers such as Chabuca Granda, Felipe Pinglo and Nicomedes Santa Cruz. The concept was later expanded to include South American folk music, especially from Argentina and Brazil. Rei created the Sofia Koutsovitis Group, an octet which also included Roeder and Coqui Pérez Albela, along with Leo Genovese on piano, Jason Palmer on trumpet, Adam Schneit on alto sax, Dan Blake on soprano and tenor sax, and Richie Barshay on drums.

Rei moved to New York in 2005, and in 2006 toured internationally with the Maria Schneider Jazz Orchestra. Her debut album, Ojalá, recorded with an octet, was released that same year. Composed of arrangements of her own compositions and songs by Argentine, Brazilian and Cuban composers, the album was named one of the year's Top 10 records by The Jazz Journalist's Association. All About Jazz described it as "eclectic and exciting," and wrote that it "exemplifies the recent trends in Latin Jazz and Latin American music in general, and proves why Sofia Koutsovitis is one of the most versatile and in-demand singers in the New York music scene."

In 2008, she sang with Bobby McFerrin in Instant Opera, a piece commissioned by John Zorn, at Carnegie Hall. She also collaborated with Geoff Keezer on his Grammy-nominated album, Aurea.

In 2009, Rei released her second album, Sube Azul. She wrote eight of the twelve tracks which appeared on Sube Azul, and co-produced the album with Roeder. Allmusic wrote: "Koutsovitis employs a sort of South American bohemian aura, using hip cultural landmarks, feelings of love and regret, and an expanded color palette to weave some magical spells over anyone who comes close to her muse...As an individual, she's hard to compare to any predecessor, except her joy and passion could rival Flora Purim, Celia Cruz, or Abbey Lincoln." The album won the Best World Beat Album at the 2009 Independent Music Awards, and Rei was named Best Latin Jazz Vocalist of 2009 by Latin Jazz Corner.

In a review of a live performance, the Boston Phoenix wrote: "Koutsovitis's savvy arrangements of originals and covers kept juggling instrumentation and modulated dynamics — soft, rubato introductions segueing into rollicking 6/8 dance themes. There were spellbinding duets with Roeder and Genovese, call-and-response vocals with the band, and two-beat audience clap-alongs. And always those rhythms — from Argentine zamba (not Brazilian samba, she was quick to point out) to Peruvian lando to Argentine chacarera, on which she accompanied herself with the tiny 10-string charango. She explained the Spanish lyrics of loss, hardship, and celebration, but the music didn't need much in the way of translation. The meaning was in her voice and in the sound of this band."

Later in 2009, Rei contributed her vocals to Lova Zhurbin's Niña Dance, a song cycle inspired by the unsolved murders & disappearances of women and young girls in the city of Juárez, Mexico. Commissioned by the Carnegie Hall Corporation, the premiere of the piece took place at Zankel Hall. Rei was chosen as a featured vocalist to premier the work as part of The Jazz Gallery's "New Voices" concert series.

Rei's third album, De Tierra y Oro, was released in 2012. Co-produced by Rei, Roeder and Fab Dupont, it was recorded with electric guitars, loops and drum machines as well as Andean charangos, Paraguayan harps, Colombian marimbas from the Pacific Coast, Argentine bombos, and Peruvian cajones. Named Best World Beat Album at the 2013 Independent Music Awards, Rei described it as a "series of ‘philosophical wanderings’ — songs that draw on a wide range of South American folkloric influences and bracingly modern sounds."

Rei has toured Europe, North and South America performing at international festivals and venues including Carnegie Hall, the Kennedy Center, (Washington DC), SF Jazz (San Francisco), the International Jazz en Lima Festival (Peru), Teatro Colsubsidio (Bogotá, Colombia), Wien Konzerthaus (Vienna, Austria), Cité de la Musique (Paris, France), North Sea Jazz (Netherlands), Tom de Festa (Portugal), the Buenos Aires International Jazz Festival (Argentina).

== Mycale, The Song Project, and other collaborations ==
Rei is a founding member of Mycale, a New-York based international a cappella quartet with Ayelet Rose Gottlieb (Israel), Malika Zarra (Morocco) and Basya Schechter (United States). Mycale was commissioned by composer John Zorn to arrange, perform and record compositions from his Book of Angels: Masada Book II. Their first album, Mycale: Book of Angels 13 was released on Tzadik Records in early 2010. The second album, Gomory, was released in 2015 on Tzadik with Sara Serpa (Portugal) as a new member of the band.

Rei is also part of John Zorn’s Song Project with Mike Patton and Jesse Harris. The project was put together by Zorn on his 60th birthday as a 30 year retrospective. The band features an "all star band of Zorn regulars" including Marc Ribot, John Medeski, Kenny Wollesen, Trevor Dunn, Joey Baron and Cyro Baptista.

Additionally, Rei performs with Myra Melford’s Language of Dreams project. She has recorded, performed or collaborated with artists including Frank London, the Klezmatics, Guillermo Klein, Ezequiel Viñao, the Panamerican Symphony Orchestra, Clarice Assad, Curupira, Las Añez, Celso Duarte, Lionel Loueke, John Scofield, Danilo Perez, Susana Baca, Eva Ayllon, Pavel Urkiza, Russ Ferrante, Bob Moses, Steve Lacy, Aquiles Baez, C4 Trio, Aca Seca, Pedrito Martinez and La Bomba de Tiempo.

== Teaching ==
Rei is currently a Professor at NYU’s Clive Davis Institute, where she teaches in the areas of Performance and Musicianship, while also serving as the Director of Global Studies. Previously, she was a member of the Voice and Songwriting departments at Berklee College of Music from 2011 to 2014, and was involved with Berklee College of Music's Global Initiatives, contributing to various programs such as its itinerant project Berklee Latino. She has also taught at the New England Conservatory and the New School College of Performing Arts, offering workshops internationally on vocal improvisation and styles training.

== Media Appearances ==
Rei appeared unscripted on the program Conan in a remote with Conan O'Brien. She was talking on her phone with her sister when Conan, who was looking for an address while doing a comedy bit of delivering Chinese food, saw her while she was reclining on the open window of her apartment and greeted her. She greeted back, gave him directions and taught him to drink Argentine mate. The video can be found on the official YouTube channel of Conan O'Brien, called Team Coco.

== Awards ==
- Jazz Journalists Association Top Ten Records of 2006
- Latin Jazz Corner, Best Latin Jazz Vocalist of 2009
- Independent Music Award, World Beat, Best Album (2009)
- Independent Music Award, World Beat, Best Album (2013)
- Independent Music Award, World Beat, Best Song (2013)
- Independent Music Award, Best Concept Album (2018)

== Discography ==
=== As Sofia Rei/Sofia Rei Koutsovitis ===
- Ojalá (Ojala, 2006)
- Sube Azul (Global Village/Harmonia Mundi, 2009)
- De Tierra y Oro (Cascabelera, 2012)
- El Gavilán (Cascabelera, 2017)
- Umbral (Cascabelera, 2021)
- ‘’Coplas Escondidas" (Cascabelera, 2023)
- ‘’Antónima" (GroundUP Music, 2026)

=== As guest ===
- Alcatraz, Alcatraz Lima (Limon, 2007)
- Clarice Assad, Imaginarium (Adventure, 2014)
- Bituin, Punto y Raya (Bituin, 2014)
- Raynald Colom, Rise (Jazz Village, 2012)
- Curupira, La Gaita Fantástica (Nova et Vetera, 2015)
- Folklore Urbano, Corazón (Chonta, 2009)
- Forro in the Dark/Forro Zinho, Forro in the Dark Plays Zorn (Tzadik, 2015)
- Jesse Harris, No Wrong No Right (Dangerbird, 2015)
- Andy McWain, Resemblance (Fuller Street, 2007)
- Nando Michelin, Como Arboles (2011)
- Mycale, Book of Angels Vol. 13 (Tzadik, 2010)
- Mycale, Gomory: Book of Angels Vol. 25 (Tzadik, 2015)
- Numinous, The Music of Joseph C. Phillips Jr. (Vipassana Innova, 2009)
- Diego Obregón & Grupo, Chonta Pequeña Historia (2012)
- Edward Perez, The Year of Two Summers (Lima Limon, 2008)
- The Song Project, Live at Le Poisson Rouge (Tzadik, 2015)
- The Song Project, Vinyl Singles Edition (Tzadik, 2014)
- Samuel Torres, Yaounde (Blue Conga, 2010)
- Ezequiel Viñao, Sonetos de Amor (Tlon, 2015)
- John Zorn, The Book Beri'ah : Keter (Tzadik, 2018)
