= Music of Colombia =

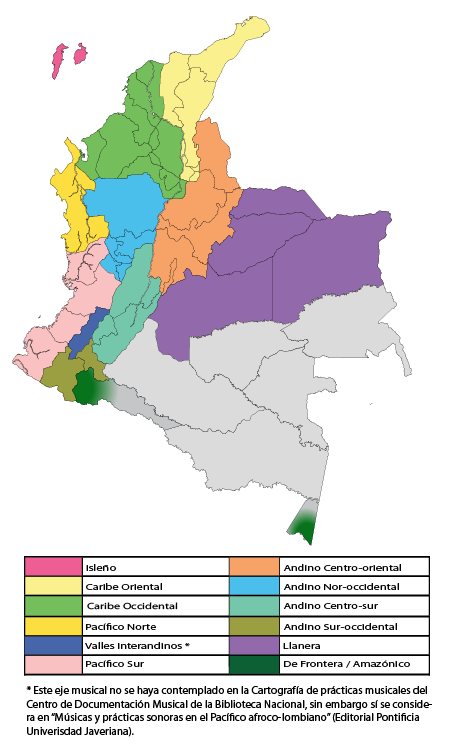
Musical Regions of Colombia

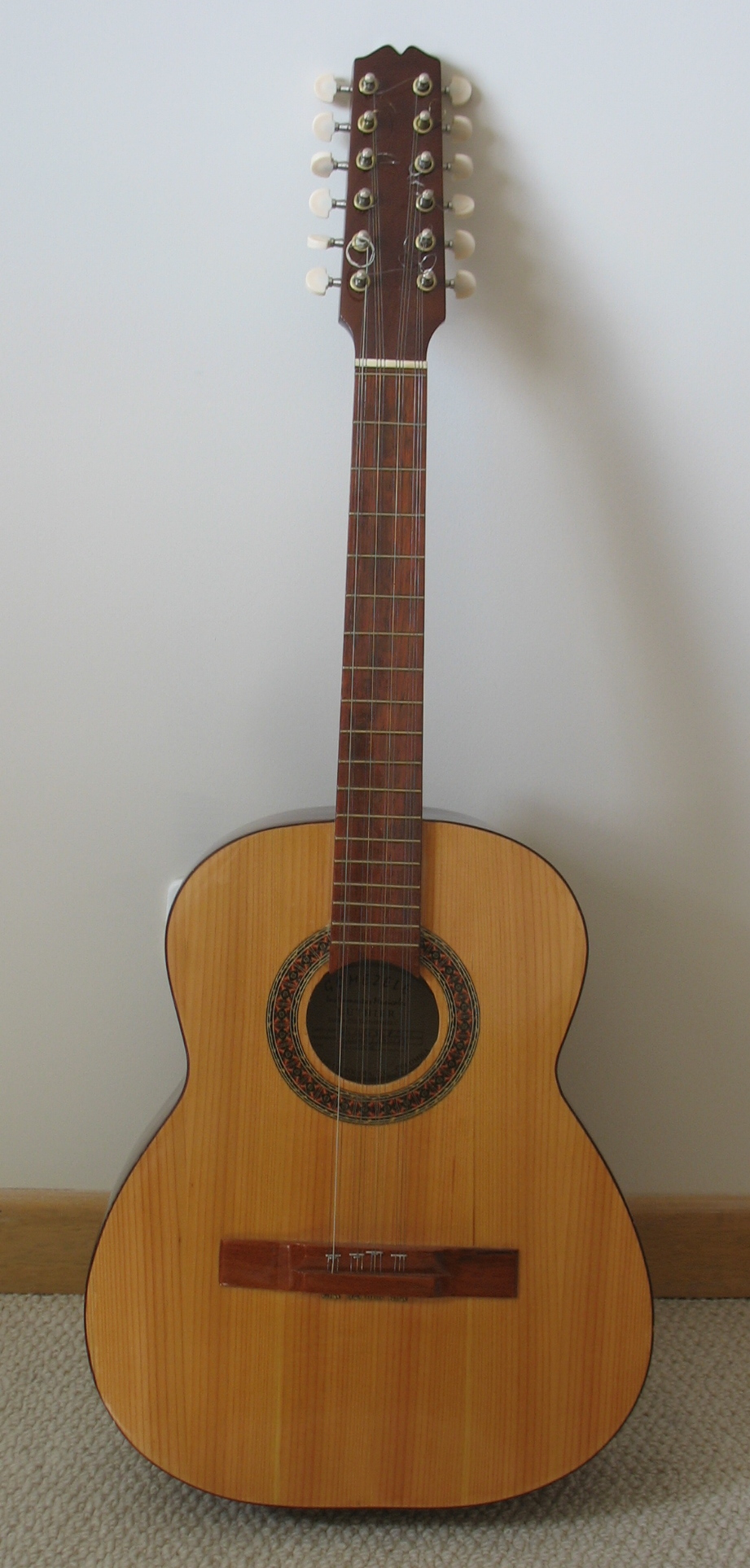
Colombian tiple

The music of Colombia is an expression of Colombian culture, music genres, both traditional and modern, according with the features of each geographic region, although it is not uncommon to find different musical styles in the same region. The diversity in musical expressions found in Colombia can be seen as the result of a mixture of Amerindian, African, and European (especially Spanish) influences, as well as more modern American.

Colombia has numerous artists that play a wide range of genres, from Pop music and Classical music to Salsa and Rock music. Colombian music is promoted by large record labels, independent companies and the Government of Colombia, through the Ministry of Culture.

== History ==
Colombian music history starts in the 19th century, even though Indigenous groups produced music before Spanish Colonisation.

During the twentieth century, Colombian music developed amid debates over the distinctions between traditional and folk music, genres of European origin, and popular music associated with mass culture and recorded sound. Between the 1910s and 1920s, significant changes in music production and consumption were taking place worldwide. In Colombia, these transformations were reflected in changing listening habits across rural and urban communities. In rural areas, people tradionally listened to music performed on homemade instruments and by brass bands at local festivities. Urban audiences, meanwhile, tended to favour European music and genres associated with the Andean region, such as pasillos and bambucos. With the introduction of imported records into Colombia, popular music from the United States, Mexico, Argentina, and Cuba, whose rich musical tradition were already widely recognised, began to circulate among elite audiences before gradually reaching working-class communities.

== Caribbean region ==
Colombia is known as "the land of a thousand rhythms" but actually holds over 1,025 folk rhythms. Some of the best known genres are cumbia and vallenato. The most recognized interpreters of traditional Caribbean and Afro-Colombian music are Totó la Momposina and Francisco Zumaqué.

=== Western Caribbean Region ===
==== Cumbia ====
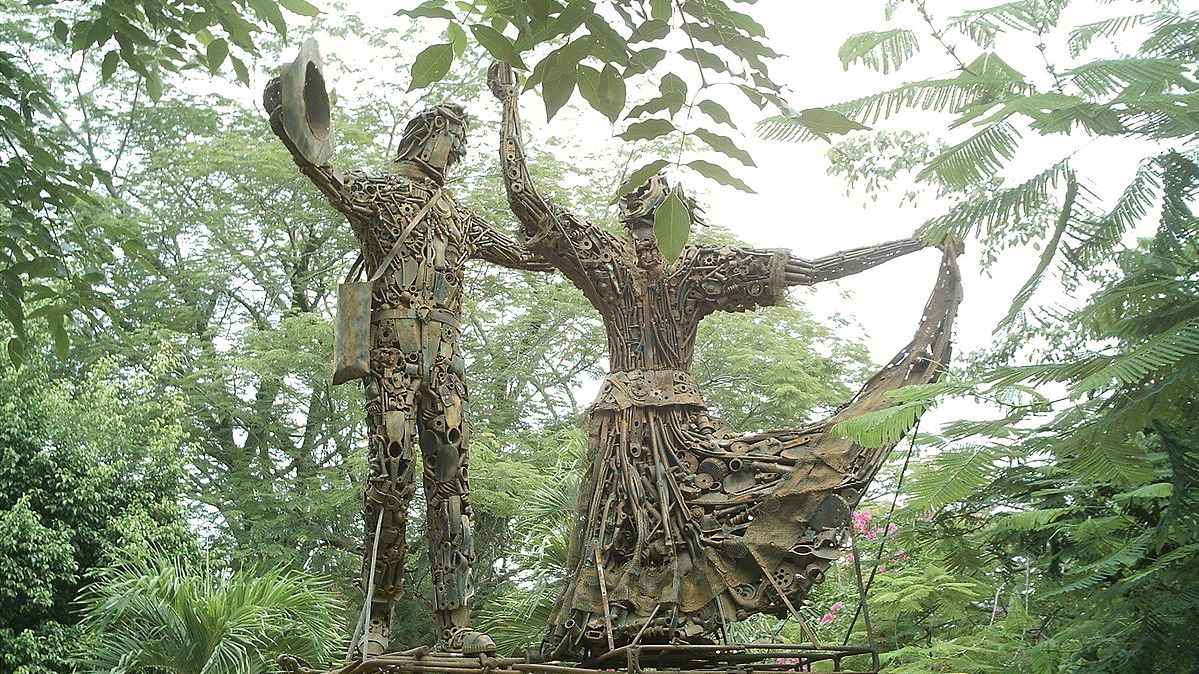
Monument to the dance and music of cumbia in El Banco

Cumbia began as a courtship dance practiced among the African population on the Caribbean coasts of Colombia. It is a mixture of Spanish, Native Colombian and African music. The style of dance is designed to recall the shackles worn around the ankles of the slaves. In the 19th century, slavery was abolished and Africans, Indians and other ethnic groups got a more complete integration in the Colombian culture.

Cumbia is a complex, rhythmic music which arose on Colombia's Atlantic coast. In its original form, cumbia bands included only percussion and vocals; modern groups include saxophones, trumpets, keyboards and trombones as well. It evolved out of native influences, combining both traditions. Some observers have claimed that the dance originally associated with iron chains around the ankle. Others still believe that it is a direct import from Guinea, which has a popular dance form called cumbe.

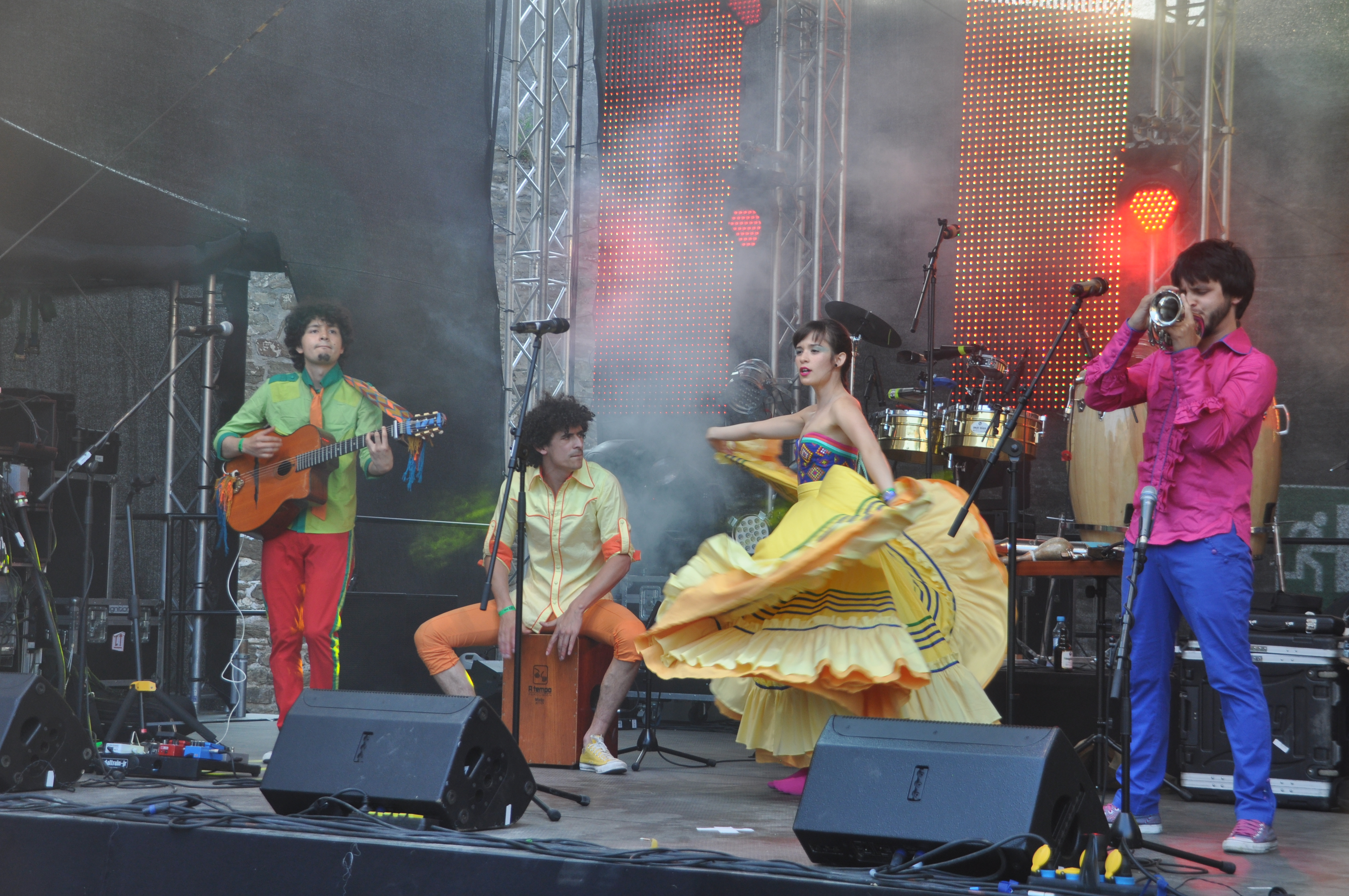
The Afro-Colombian ensemble Monsieur Periné mixes cumbian sounds with a gypsy-swing style.

Cumbia's form was solidified in the 1940s when it spread from the rural countryside to urban and middle-class audiences. Mambo, big band and porro brass band influences were combined by artists like Lucho Bermúdez to form a refined form of cumbia that soon entered the Golden Age of Cumbia during the 1950s. Discos Fuentes, the largest and most influential record label in the country, was founded during this time. Fruko, known as the Godfather of Salsa, introduced Cuban salsa to Colombia and helped bring Discos Fuentes to national prominence by finding artists like La Sonora Dinamita, who brought cumbia to Mexico, where it remains popular.

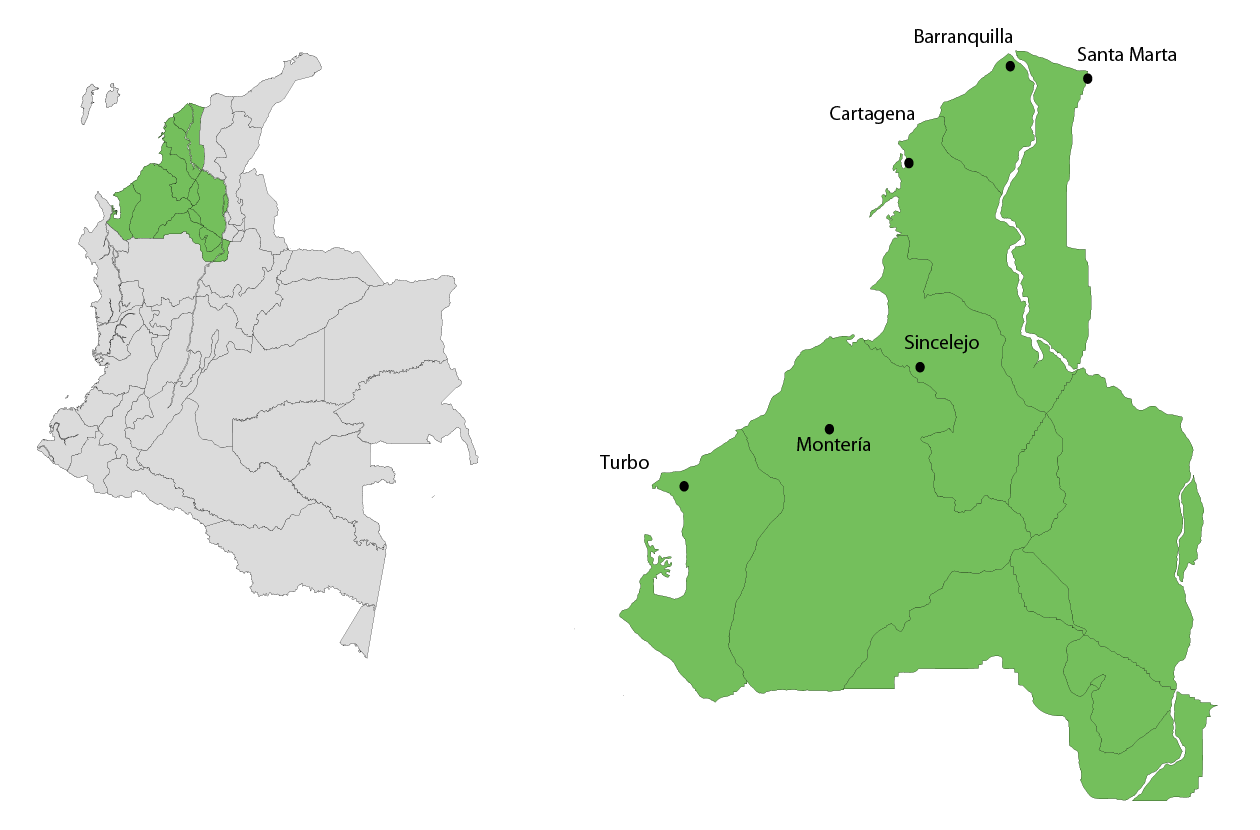
Western Caribbean

It is worth pointing out that the "classic" cumbia known throughout Colombia is the "Cumbia Cienaguera". This song reflects a uniquely Colombian feel known as "sabor" (flavour) and "ambiente" (atmosphere). Arguably, this song has remained a Colombian staple through the years and is widely known as Colombia's unofficial national anthem. Some artists are Los Gaiteros de San Jacinto, Los Graduados, Los Black Stars, Los Golden Boys, Los Teen Agers, and Los Corraleros de Majagual. In the United States, an Afro- Colombian band based in New York called Grupo Rebolu, performs a variety of Afro-Colombian rhythms with authentic instruments such as Tambora and Tambor Alegre. Their repertoire includes Cumbia and many more genres from the Northern coast of Colombia as part of their original compositions.

External videos
- La vida vale la pena (Tambora - Eje musical Caribe Occidental), Interpretado por Petrona Martínez en YouTube
- Los sabores del porro (Porro - Eje musical Caribe Occidental), Interpretado por Totó la Momposina en YouTube
- Una canción en el Magdalena (Cumbia sentá - Eje musical Caribe Occidental), Interpretado por Martina Camargo en YouTube
- Danza negra (Cumbia de salón - Eje musical Caribe Occidental), Interpretado por Matilde Díaz, compuesta por Lucho Bermudez en YouTube
- Me duele el alma (Fandango - Eje musical Caribe Occidental), Interpretado por María Mulata en YouTube
- El botón del pantalón (Terapia - Eje musical Caribe Occidental), Interpretado por Sistema Solar en YouTube

==== Champeta and African-diasporic music ====
Some Colombian communities, such as Chocó, Cartagena, San Andres and Providence Island, have large African-descendant communities. Unlike most of the country, cultural mixing with native and European influences have been rare, and, especially in El Chocó, music has changed little since being imported from West Africa. Providencia Island is also home to a type of folk music which is closely related to mento, a Jamaican folk form. Most influentially, however, is the city of Cartagena and its champeta music which has been influenced by soukous, compas, zouk, and reggae. Champeta musicians have included Luis Towers, El Afinaíto, El Sayayín, El Pupy, and Boogaloo, while others like Elio Boom have incorporated Jamaican raggamuffin music to champeta.

==== Porro ====
Porro bands are a form of big band music that came from Sucre, Córdoba and Sabana de Bolívar. The brass ensembles are modeled after European military bands. Notable porros include Pacho Galan.

=== Eastern Caribbean musical region ===
==== Vallenato ====
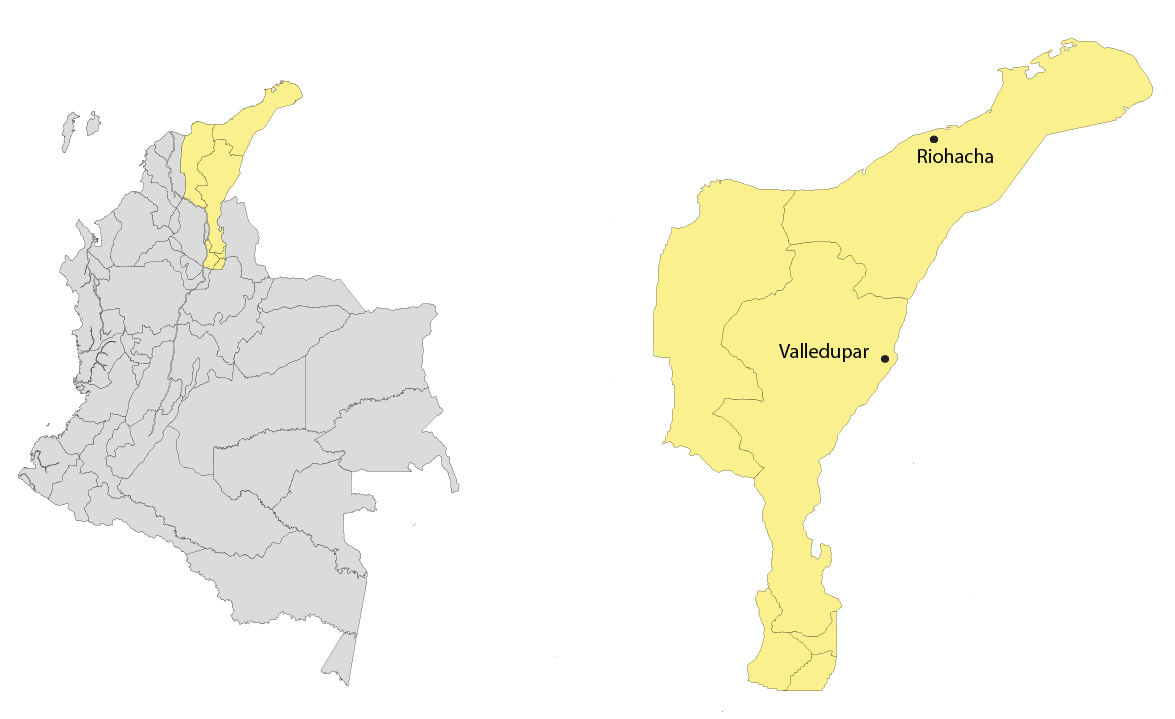
Eastern Caribbean

La puya rebelde (Puya - example of a genre of folk music in the Eastern Caribbean.)

Vallenato was first played by the pre-Columbian Indians using traditional instruments. The first vallenato singer was Guillermo Buitrago, born in the Magdalena department. Vallenato did not always use accordion as its main instrument. In fact, from 1920 to 1936 the main instrument was the guitar. Groups such as bovea and sus vallenatos also are among the first vallenato singers. They form the group in the city of Barranquilla Atlantico department. They also were the first to take the vallenato music to a different country like Argentina, specifically in northern Argentina. Contrary to popular belief, vallenato is not a rhythm. Rather, it is a genre. It is made up of four rhythms: Son, Puya, Merengue, and Paseo. Vallenato arose in Valledupar on Colombia's Atlantic Coast and only gained popularity elsewhere in the country in the 1980s. Its origins are shrouded in mystery but are said to have begun with Francisco el Hombre, who allegedly defeated Satan in a musical contest. Based around the accordion, the guacharaca, and the caja vallenata (a larger version of the bongo), vallenato has long been connected with cumbia. Influential artists include Alejo Duran and more recently, Alfredo Gutiérrez and Lisandro Meza. In addition to the accordion, the bass guitar has been a common part of vallenato ensembles since it was introduced by Caliya in the mid-1960s. The most recent modernization of vallenato occurred in 1993 when Carlos Vives released Clásicos de la Provincia, which made him into a star and changed the face of vallenato.

An important phenomenon has occurred in Colombia with vallenato. At first it was an exclusive kind of music for Atlantic Coast people but because the proliferation of radio programs of this genre in other cities of the republic (such as Bogota), and the migration of people from the coast to the capital, vallenato spread to the rest of Colombia. Not only the music, but the musicians of the genre increased in the capital and other cities. In 2006 for the first time, a musician from Bogota, Alberto "Beto" Jamaica, was the king of vallenato in the traditional competition to play accordion, "El Festival Vallenato". Other important musicians from other cities have taken importance in the vallenato world.

Vallenato has spawned several subgenres, including vallenato-protesta, which is known for socially aware lyrics, and charanga vallenata, which was invented by Cubans in the United States like progenitor Roberto Torres.

==== Other Caribbean genres ====
- Chalupa
- Champeta
- Chande
- Cumbión
- Bullerengue
- Décimas
- Fandango
- Gaita
- Lumbalú
- Mapalé
- Maya
- Merecumbé
- Mode Up/Mud Up
- Pajarito
- Parrandí
- Pilón
- Pompo
- Porro
- Puya
- Son Sabanero
- Son Palenquero
- Tambora
- Tamborito

== Pacific Region of Colombia ==
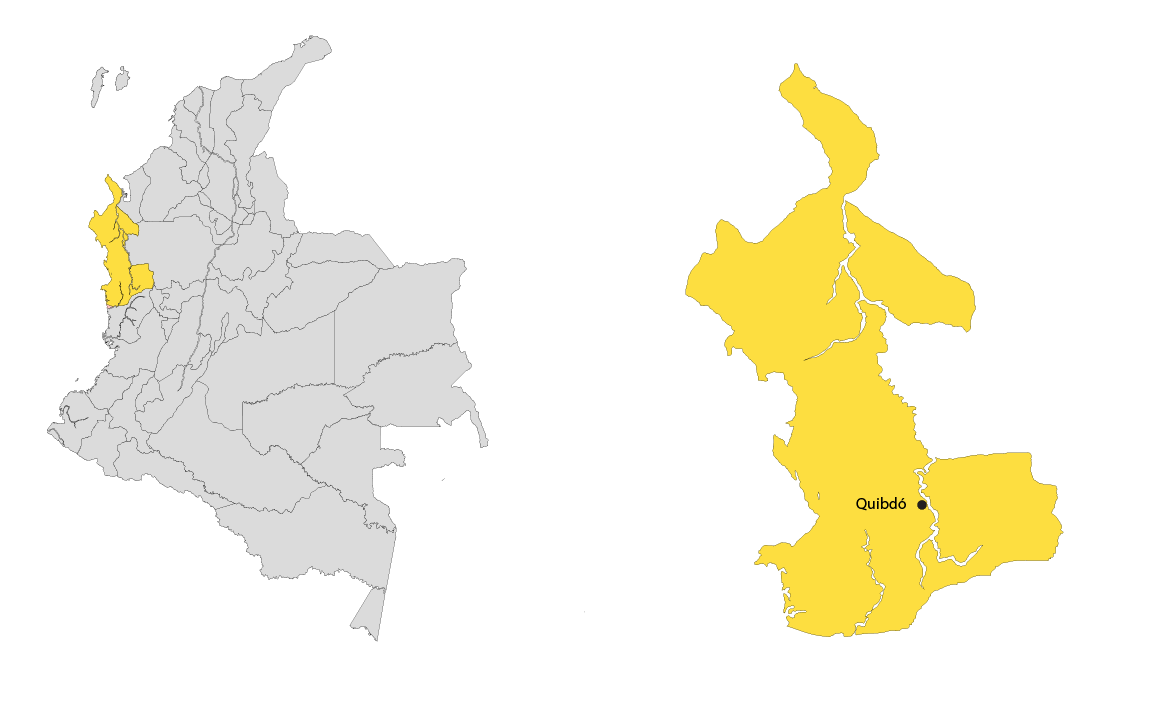
North Pacific

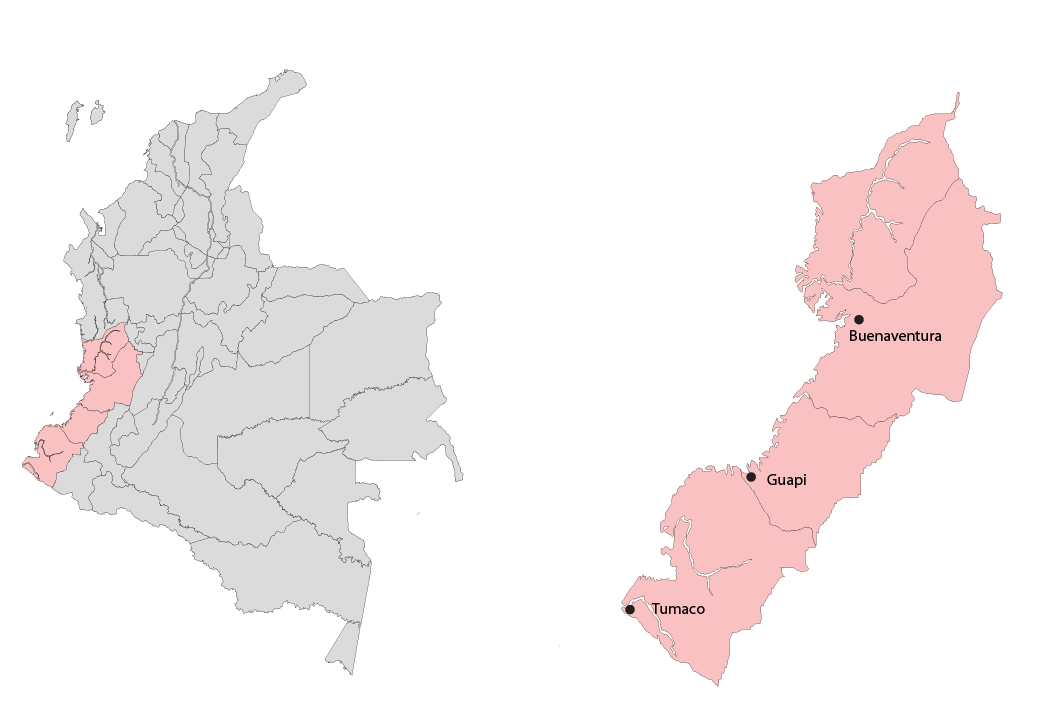
South Pacific

La Guayabita (Juga - example of a genre of folk music in the South Pacific.)

=== Currulao ===
This is one of the most African influenced-styles in all of Colombia, and has its roots among the Afro-Colombian people of the Pacific coast.

In its most basic form, the currulao is played by a group of four musicians.

One musician plays a 6-8 rhythm on a drum known as a "cununo", which superficially resembles the "alegre" drum (used in Cumbia) to the untrained eye, but is narrower and taller. The Currulao rhythm is created by both striking the skin of the drum with one's hand and tapping the side of the drum with a small stick.

The second musician keeps time on a shaker known in parts of Colombia as a "guasá"(goo-ah-SAH) or "guache"(goo-AH-cheh), which is typically a hollow cylinder made of metal, wooden, or guadua bamboo, filled with light seeds, rice is sometimes used in home-made guasás.

But the main instrument of the currulao style is perhaps the Colombian marimba, a wooden xylophone which resembles the African balafon also for the style of playing.

Many groups in Colombia perform this traditional style of music. Currently, the most renowned groups include Grupo Socavón, Grupo Gualajó, and Grups Bahia Trio. A well renowned figure among the old marimbero masters in Colombia is Baudilio Cuama Rentería from Buenaventura Colombia.

In the United States two Colombian Bands performing this genre with authentic traditional instruments are La Cumbiamba NY, on the east coast (New York), and Aluna Band in the west coast (San Francisco). In 2010, Currulao has been added to the UNESCO list of Masterpieces of the Oral and Intangible Heritage of Humanity.

=== Other Pacific genres ===
- Abozao
- Aguabajo
- Alabao
- Andarele o Amanecer
- Arrullo
- Bambara Negra
- Bambuco Viejo
- Berejú
- Boga
- Bunde Chocoano
- Caderona
- Calipso Chocoano
- Chigualo o Gualí
- Contradanza Chocoana
- Danza Chocoana
- Jota Chocoana
- Juga
- La Caramba
- La Madruga
- Makerule
- Mazurka chocoana
- Pango o Pangora
- Patacoré
- Polka Chocoana
- Porro Chocoano
- Pregón
- Romance
- Salve
- Saporrondón o Sapo-Rondó
- Son Chocoano
- Tamborito Chocoano
- Tiguarandó
- Villancico Chocoano

== Andean Region of Colombia ==
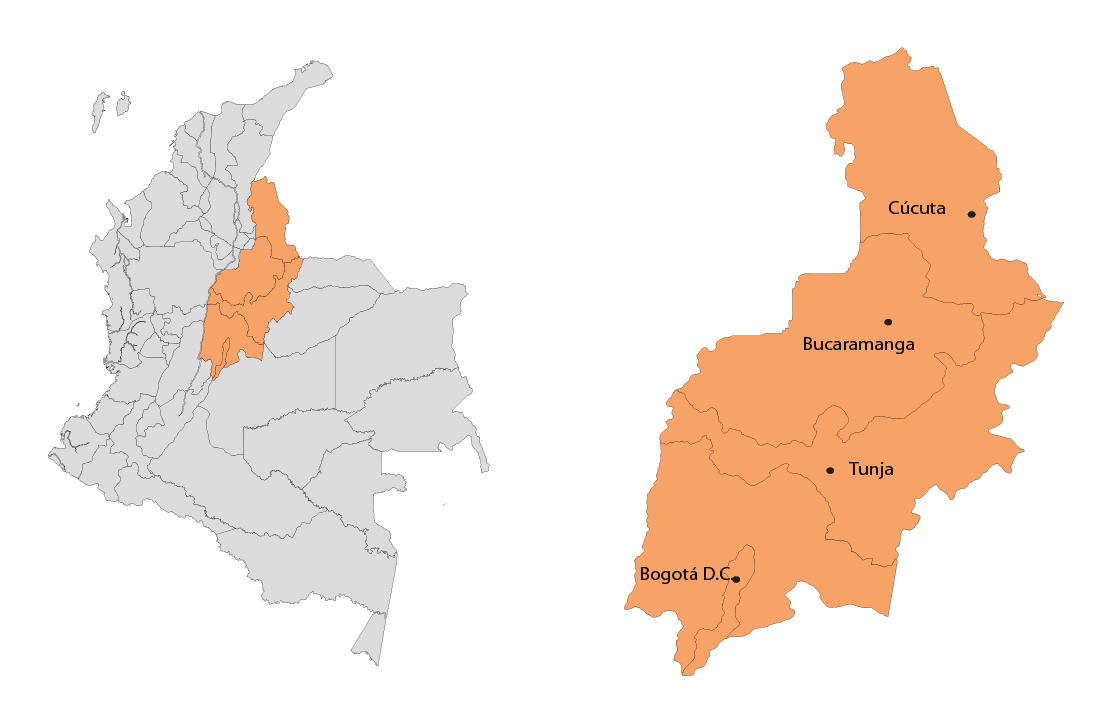
Center-East Andean

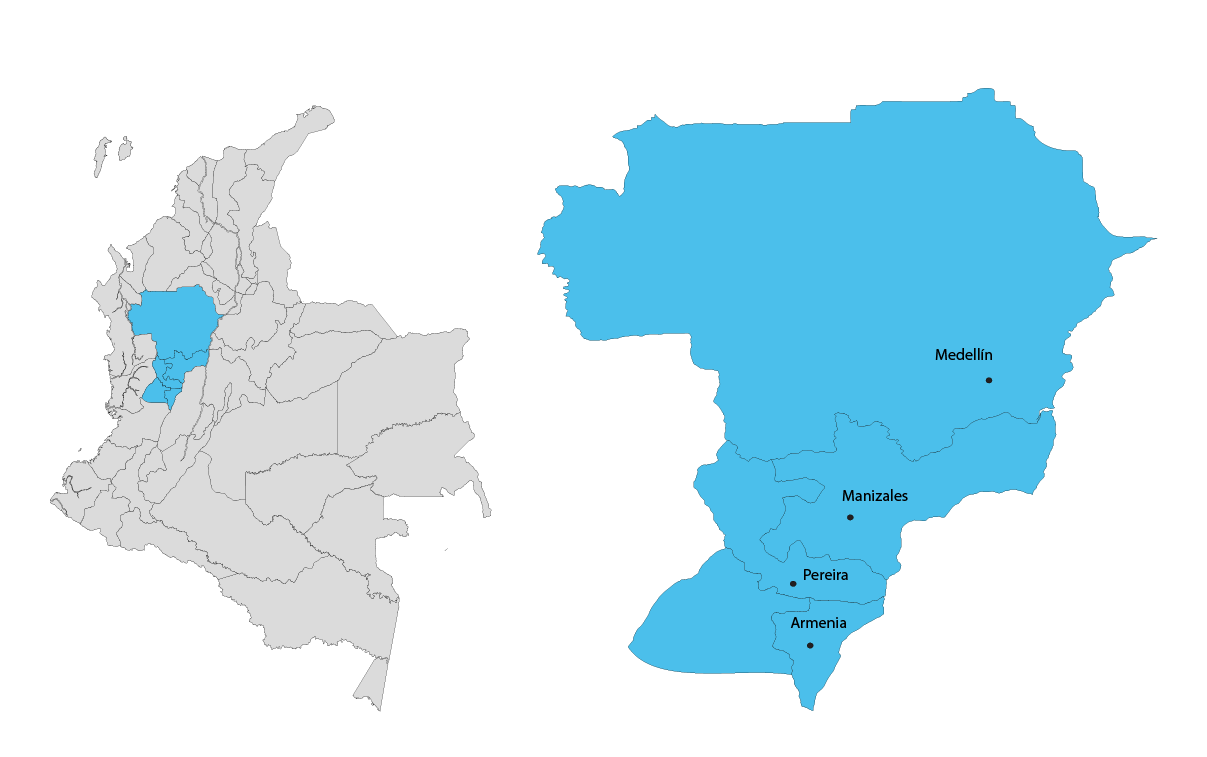
North-Western Andean

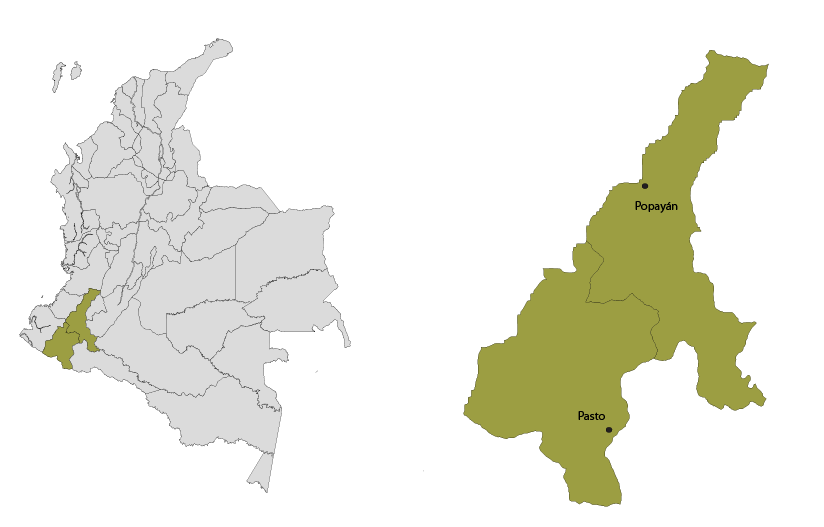
South-Western Andean

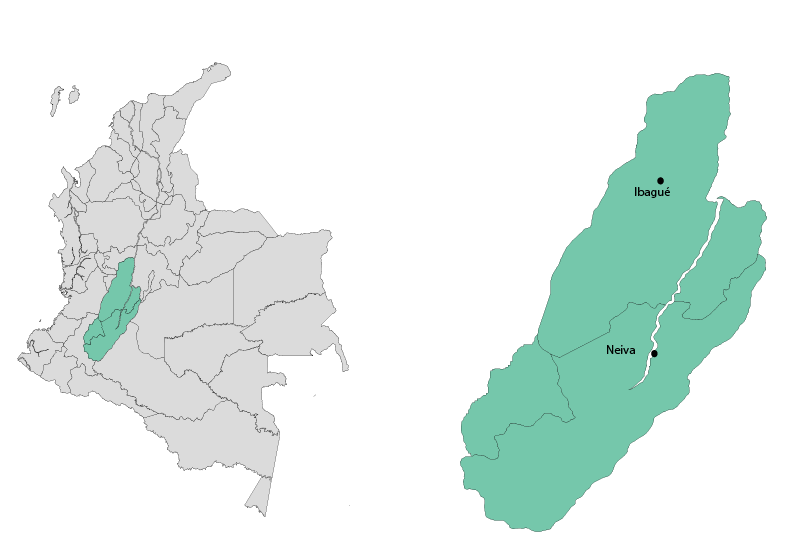
Center-South Andean

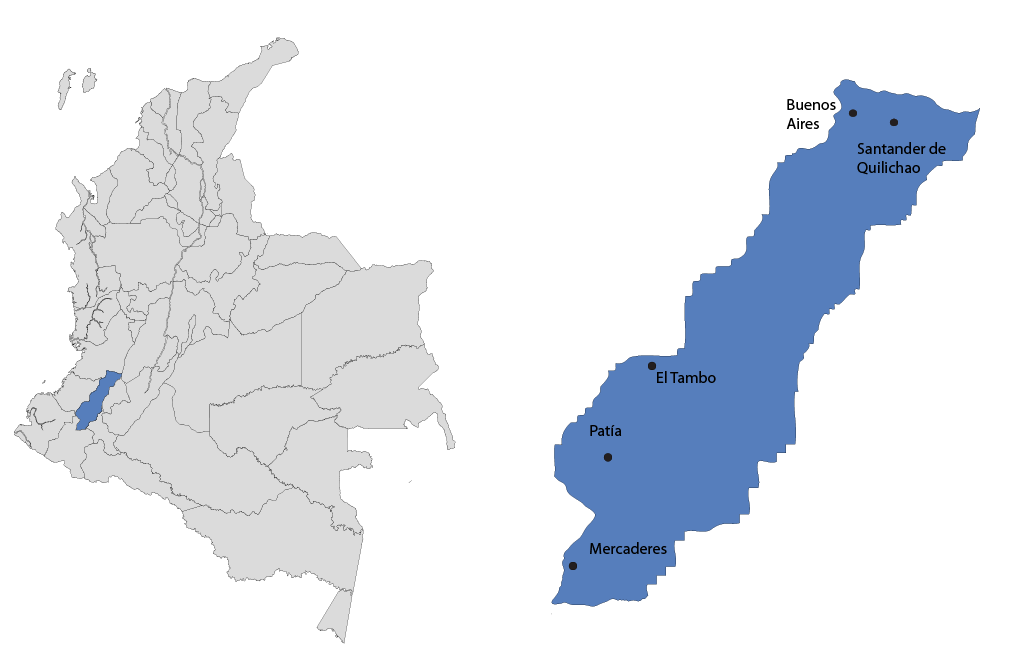
Pacific inter-Andean valleys

Flor de Romero (Bambuco - example of a genre of folk music in the Center-East Andean)	Ojito de Agua (Merengue Bambuquiao - example of a genre of folk music in the North-Western Andean)	Ángela (Hayno - example of a genre of folk music in the South-Western Andean)	Siquele (Rajaleña - example of a genre of folk music in the Center-South Andean)

=== Bambuco ===
Bambuco is a type of music with Basque and Native American influence, sometimes known as Música del interior. It is not clear the origins of this style, many specialists agree that it has some components of Spanish folk music, while others believe it has a typical rhythm which was inherited from the Quechua or Chibchas. According to Rafael Pombo, the Bambuco originated among the mestizo masses. Briefly, it is the result of the ethnic mixture from the colony time, being influencing by different cultural elements. Its popularity has long been, but was extremely popular across Colombia from the mid-1920s to the late 1930s. Artists include Estudiantina, Los Carranguerros de Raquira, Jaime Llano González, Jorge Villamil, and the Morales Pino Trío.

=== Guabina ===
Guabina is a rhythm from the Andean Mountains in Colombia. The features of this music are based on dances and lifestyles of the people from Antioquia, Santander, Boyacá, Tolima, and, Huila. The Guabina rhythm includes dancers, but it may be played without them. There is a version of the Guabina that is played faster and is called Torbellino. Another type of Guabina, known as guabina-torbellino, is a mixture of the instrumental torbellino and the sung guabina, particularly in its a cappella format. Guabina is most popular in rural communities.

=== Other Andean genres ===
- Bambuco fiestero
- Bunde
- Guasca (or "música carrilera")
- Caña
- Cañabrava
- Carranga
- Copla
- Danza Criolla
- Porro Antioqueño
- Rajaleña
- Rumba Campesina
- Fandanguillo Criollo
- Guabina
- Guaneña
- Guasca
- Pasillo
- Sanjuanero
- Torbellino
- Vueltas Antioqueñas
- Criollo waltz

== Orinoquía Region of Colombia ==
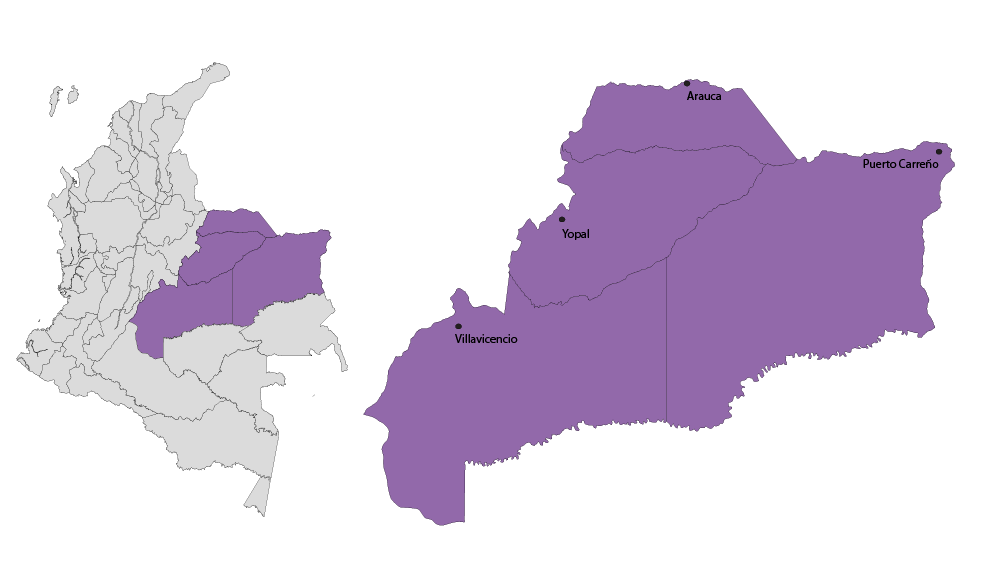
Eastern Plains

Zumbaquezumba (Zumbaquezumba - example of a genre of folk music in the Eastern Plains.)

=== Joropo ===
Música llanera is a harp-led genre of music from the Llanos popular throughout Colombia. It includes the traditional joropo musical style, and is known for verbal contests called contrapunteo. Artists in this genre include Alfredo Rolando Ortiz (born in Cuba), Alma Llanera (Colombian band), Cimarrón (band), Luis Ariel Rey, Carlos Rojas, Sabor Llanero, Arnulfo Briceño, and Orlando Valdemarra. This particular type of music is also popular in Venezuela due to the shared llanos. It is considered to be the national music of Venezuela. Listen joropo music .

=== Other Orinoco region genres ===
- Cachicama
- Catira
- Chipola
- Contrapunteo
- Corrío
- Galerón
- Gaván
- Pasaje
- Periquera
- Perro de Agua
- Gavilan
- Guacaba
- Guacharaca
- Juana Guerrero
- Merecure
- Moña or Moño
- Pajarillo
- Poema Llanero
- Quirpa
- Seis
- Zumba-que-zumba

== Insular Region (Colombia) ==
=== Musical genres ===
- Calipso
- Compas
- Foxtrot
- Mazurka
- Mento
- Praise Hymn
- Pasillo isleño
- Polca
- Quadrille
- Reggae
- Schottische
- Soca
- Vals isleño
- Zouk

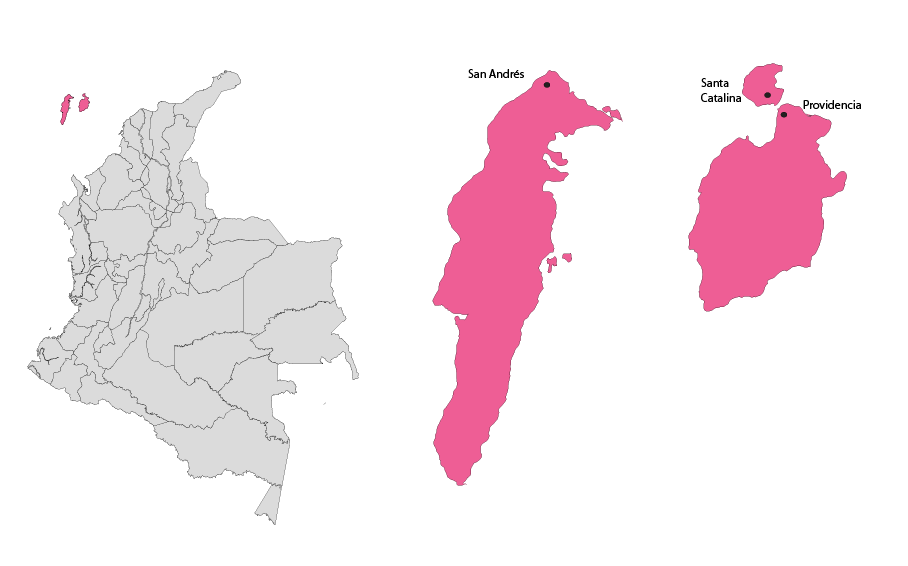
Insular Region

Rub a Dub (Socca - example of a genre of folk music in the insular region.)
Creole Band

== Amazon Region of Colombia ==
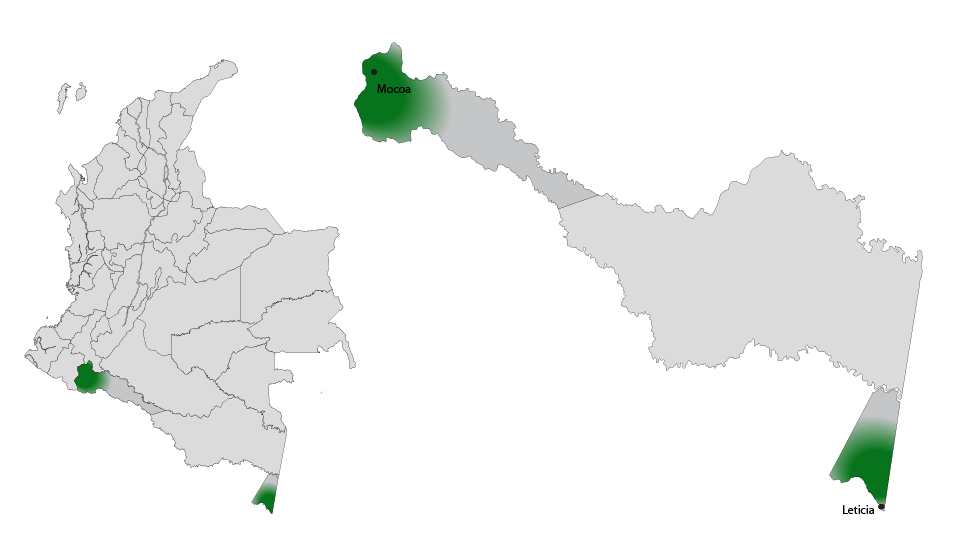
Amazon Region

=== Musical instruments ===
- Guitar
- Menguaré
- Shakers
- Drum
- Tambourine

=== Musical genres ===
- Batuques
- Ciría
- Dobrado
- Mariquinha
- Mixtianas
- Paseata
- Porrosambas
- Tangarana
- Sanjuanito
- Huayno
- Bambuco
- Pasillo
- Sanjuanero
- Merengure Campesino
- Tonadas Indígenas

== Contemporary music ==
=== Colombian salsa ===
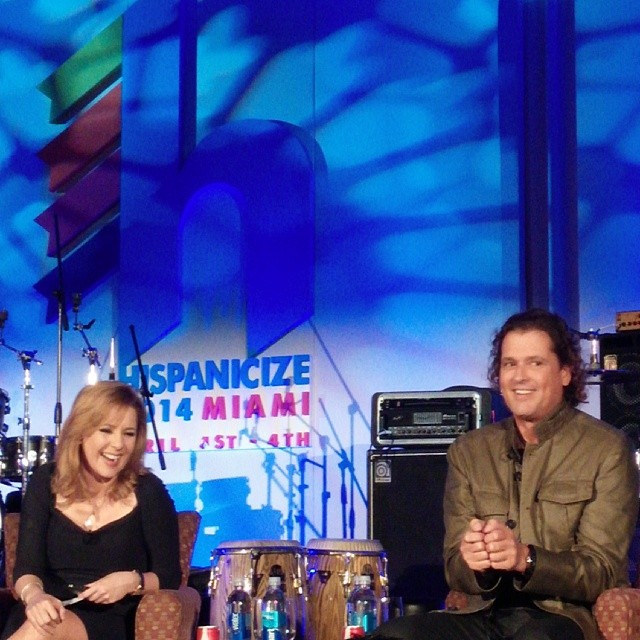
Carlos Vives interviewed by Ana María Canseco

Salsa music was born among Puerto Ricans and Cubans in New York, but soon spread to Colombia. Native salsa groups like Fruko y sus Tesos and labels that recorded them like Discos Fuentes emerged. Artists like Joe Arroyo followed, inventing a distinctively Colombian form of salsa. Other influential Colombian salsa artists include Cristian Del Real "The Timbal Genius", Grupo Niche, Alquimia, La Misma Gente, Los Titanes, Los Nemus del Pacífico, Orquesta Guayacán, Grupo Galé and La Sonora Carruseles. Some of the most prolific composers in the genre are Jairo Varela and Nino Caicedo whose compositions have been recorded by Grupo Niche and Orquesta Guayacán respectively. Several Cuban and Puerto Rican musicians who have established in Colombia, such as Diego Valdés and Israel Tanenbaum, have collaborated with Colombians in salsa projects. Recently Colombian dancers have become World Champions year after year and the style is becoming more popular and admired among Salsa professionals worldwide. As a dance, Colombian Salsa is unique and different from New York/Puerto Rico and Cuban salsa. Colombian Salsa concentrates on footwork and does not incorporate cross-body leads. Dancers leave the upper part of the body still and relaxed while the feet do extremely fast and complex movements.

=== Colombian rock music ===
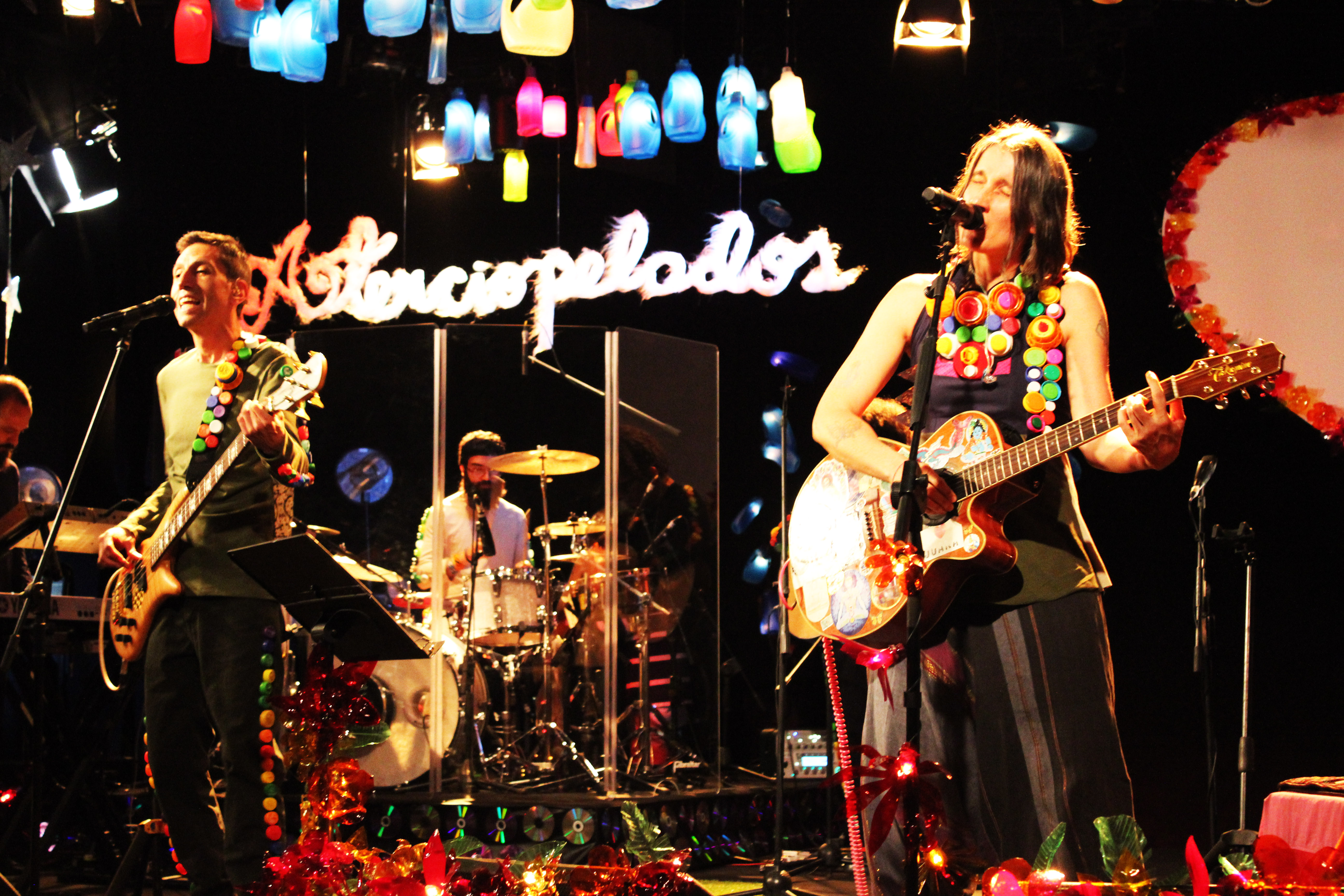
Aterciopelados is a Spanish-language rock band from Colombia.

During the late 1950s, Mexican rock artists such as Enrique Guzmán and César Costa gained popularity in Colombia. By the 1960s, local Colombian rock bands, including Los Speakers and The Flippers, established a significant domestic following. Beginning around 1967 (see 1967 in music), Colombian bands like Génesis (unrelated to the British band Genesis) began blending native traditional genres, such as cumbia, with rock music.

Among the early figures in the genre was Marco Tulio Sánchez B., known professionally as "Marco, the voice of Rock and Roll" and later dubbed the "Elvis colombiano." Sánchez contributed to the development of Colombian rockabilly and country-influenced rock, utilizing mono-line reel-to-reel tape recordings and performing in Spanish. His stage performances and vocal style earned him recognition both domestically and internationally.

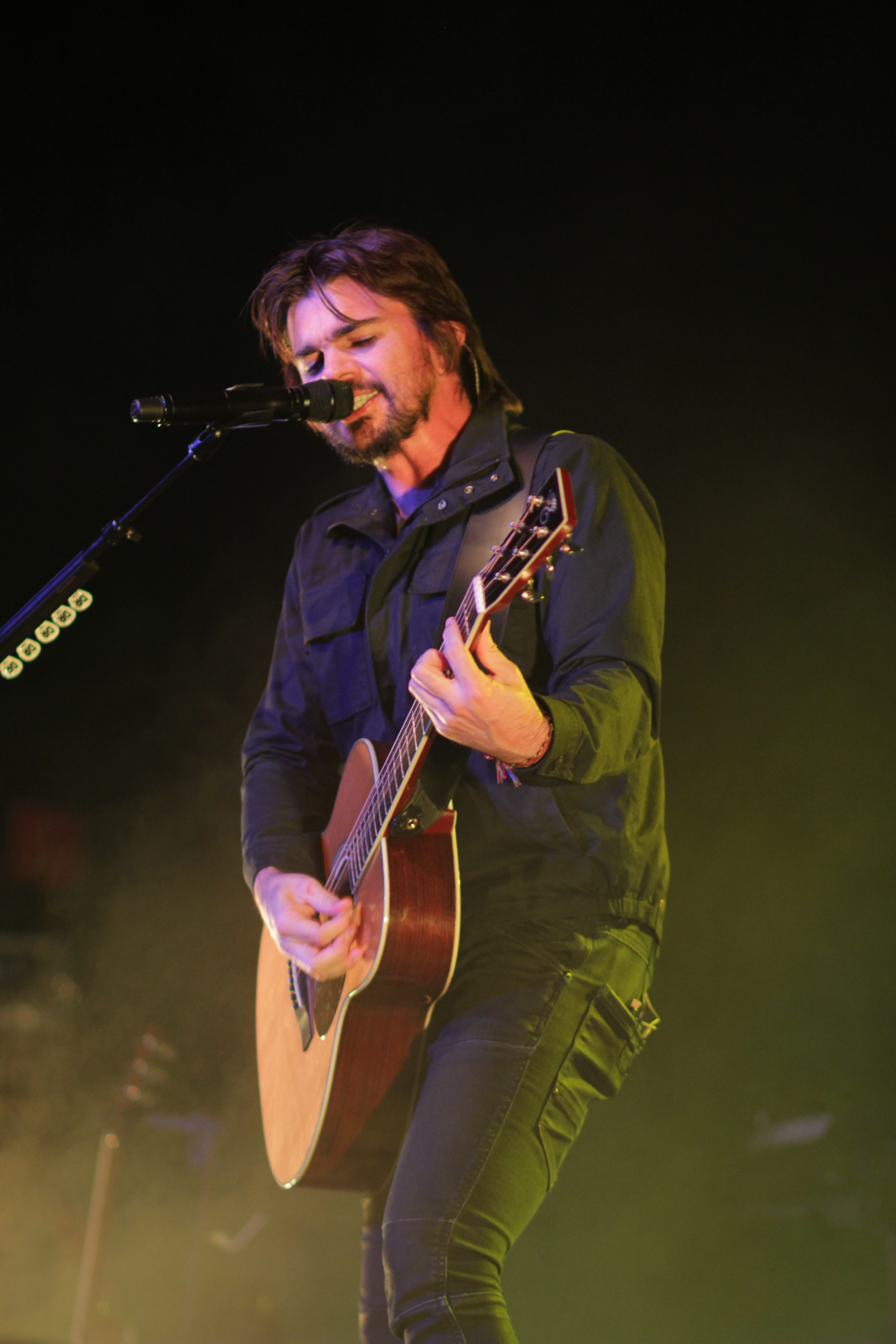
Juanes

Rock in Colombia gained great popularity during the 1980s with the arrival of bands such as Soda Stereo (Argentina), Los Prisioneros (Chile), and Hombres G (Spain). During the '90s, many punk and heavy metal bands appeared in Bogotá, Medellín, and Cali. Colombia has possibly the biggest underground, hardcore, metal and punk movement of the continent, and is known in Latin America as the "punk corner". Kraken and Masacre are some of the most important Colombian rock bands.

The music event Rock al Parque celebrated yearly in Bogotá is the largest free rock festival in Latin America; around 100 bands playing their music along 3 days and 400,000 people in attendance. Currently, Doctor Krápula, a rock band with strong ska influences that is known for making covers of traditional Latin American songs, enjoys great popularity. A popular Colombian Rock band outside of Colombia is The Monas. Aterciopelados named "Colombia's Hottest Band" in a Time magazine article, is one of the most recognized Rock bands of Colombia. "The band, made up of front woman Andrea Echeverri and bassist/producer Hector Buitrago, mixes punk, surf guitar and ska with folky Colombian styles such as vallenato, a bouncy, accordion-heavy genre".

Other popular and interesting bands are: Ekhymosis, a group led by Juanes, who began making music in 1988 and are known for doing rock with a Colombian influence, and The Hall Effect who make English pop/rock linked with Britpop influences. SOUNDACITY performs a mix of Brit rock, pop and Andean sounds, rhythms and instrumentation, sing both in English and Spanish and have toured the United States east coast. Proper Strangers is an avant-garde rock band. Two Way Analog is an eclectic band whose influence are roadmovies and its soundtracks, Divagash is an electronic soft-rock band, La Pestilencia is a post-hardcore band, Bajo Tierra, Palenke Soultribe (traditional Colombin roots music fused with electronic beats). But, possibly, the most successful "indie" band is Sidestepper, with its fusion of Colombian traditional music, electronic and African rhythms, who already appeared in Coachella Festival in 2006. Some musical groups in the death metal genre are the world-famous Internal Suffering, Carnivore Diprosopus, Goretrade, Mindly Rotten, Suppuration, and Amputated Genitals. Colombia is also the birthplace of the well known black metal band Inquisition, now based in Seattle, Washington. Miguel Fernando Trapezaris, the bassist of Cyprus-based power metal band Winter's Verge, is of Colombian descent.

=== Colombian pop music ===
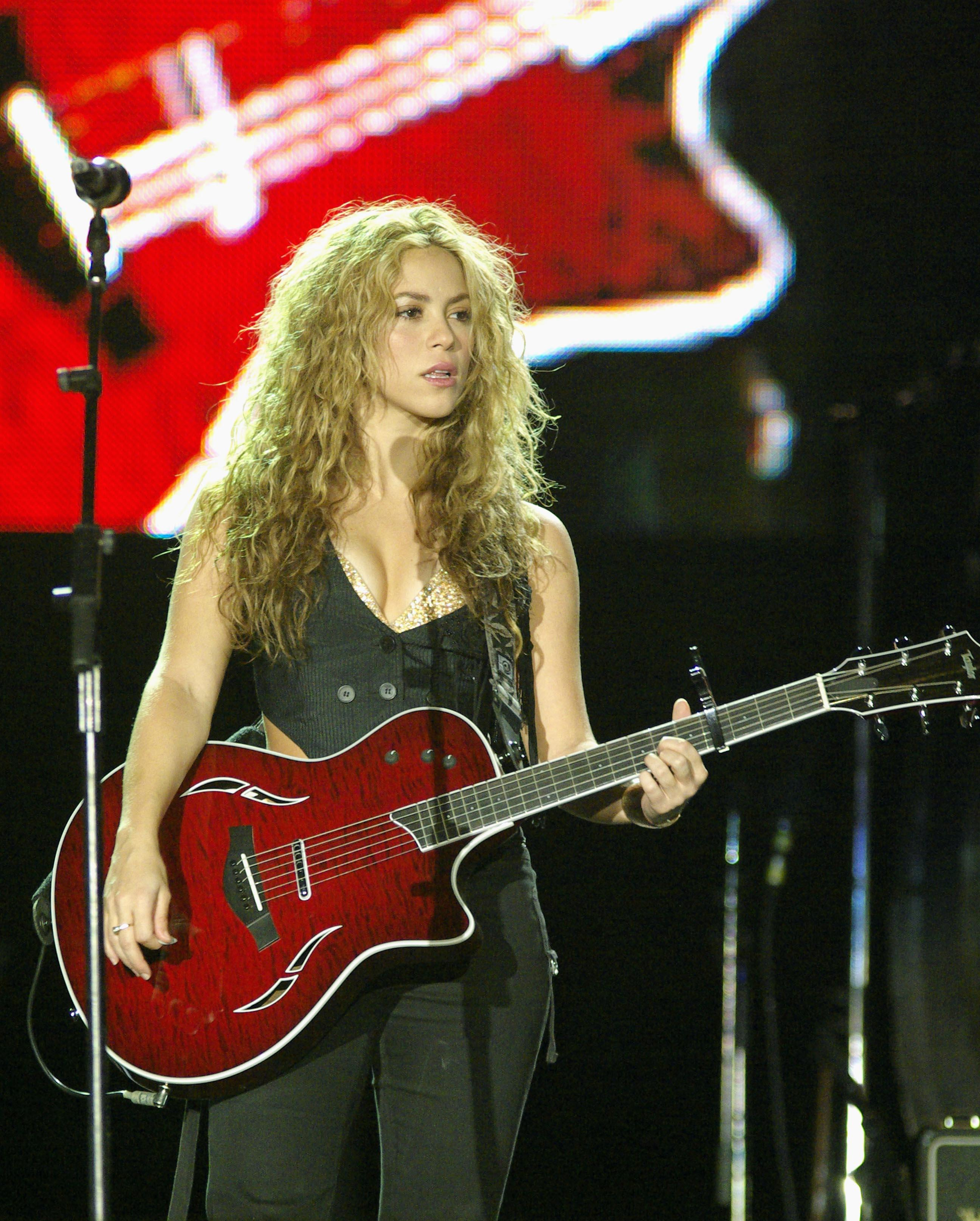
Shakira

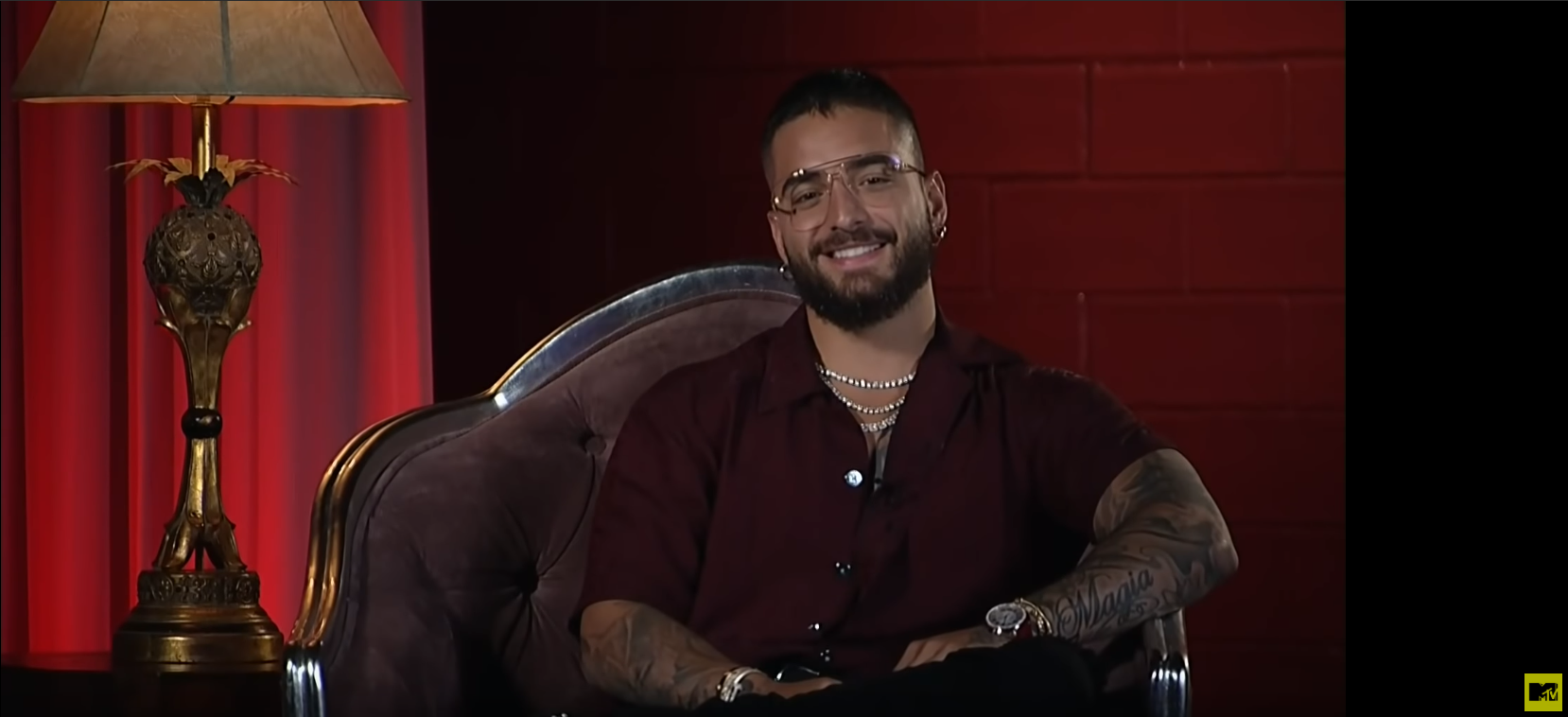
Maluma during the world premiere of music video "Medellin" on MTV

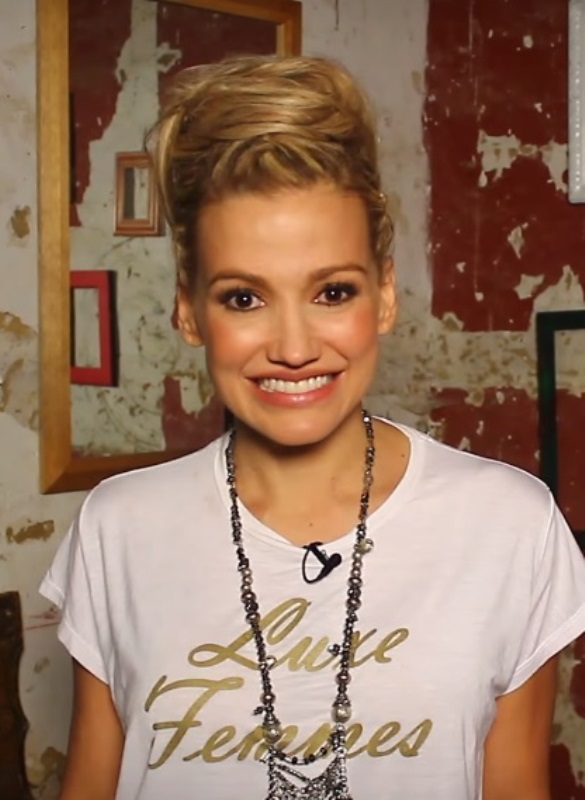
Fanny Lu

This musical genre has been experiencing an increase in popularity recently with artists like Los de Adentro, San Alejo, Sebastian Yepes, Lucas Arnau, or Mauricio & Palodeagua. Pop with strong traces of traditional Colombian music, named Tropipop, is also becoming more popular. Fonseca and Maía represent this trend.

=== Some of Colombia's most recognized pop artists ===
Shakira is the highest selling and most recognized Colombian artist. After the success of her album Pies Descalzos in 1995, Shakira began working with producer Emilio Estefan Jr. and recorded Dónde Están los Ladrones?, which sold millions worldwide. Showing all her talent, after her MTV Unplugged presentation, Shakira went on to make an English album Laundry Service which debuted at #3 in the Billboard Charts of the USA.

One of her most successful songs is "Hips Don't Lie", which sold over 10 million copies and downloads worldwide, topped in over 70 countries #1.

She is winner of 4 American and 15 Latin Grammies. In 2008, Shakira was nominated for a Golden Globe.

Singer-songwriter Juanes is also one of the most important singers from Colombia. He stood out at the Latin Grammys in 2003 with his album Un Día Normal, which has become very popular in the US and Europe. Juanes is the most important Colombian artist of the last decade, as mentioned by the Billboard magazine and Colombian El Espectador newspapaer, due to the success of songs such as Fíjate Bien, A Dios le Pido, La Camisa Negra, Me Enamora and Yerbatero. His albums Fíjate Bien, Un Día Normal, Mi Sangre, La Vida es un Ratico and P.A.R.C.E. have been successful in many countries around the world.

Juanes was chosen by CNN as a global icon and is the youngest of the list. His humanitarian activism has characterized him as a very supportive artist in the history of Latin music. Since he began his musical career, Juanes has broken several records in the history of the Latin Grammys.

Fanny Lú, is also an important artist, from the southern city of Santiago de Cali. She has released three full-length albums, Lágrimas Cálidas, Dos and Felicidad y Perpetua. Her first almbum produced two hits: No Te Pido Flores and Y Si Te Digo. The second one included the hit Tú No Eres Para Mi and, more recently, Fanfarrón became a hit from her third studio album. She also serves as a Goodwill Ambassador to the United Nations.

Maía, born in the same port city as Shakira, Barranquilla, is a trilingual artist who has topped the charts with several international hits including Niña Bonita, Se Me Acabó El Amor, and Ingenuidad. From her debut album, there is El Baile de los Sueños.

Ilona, a native of Colombia's capital city, Bogotá, cut her teeth singing in the public transport bus service at the age of 15. She has released two full-length studio albums including Desde Mi Ventana and the Latin Grammy Award nominated Allá en el Sur.

Carlos Vives, a singer from the coastal city of Santa Marta, is famous for fusing classic vallenato sounds with rock and pop music. He has collaborated with diverse international artists such as Ricky Martin, Marc Anthony and Daddy Yankee, as well as countrymen Sebastián Yatra, ChocQuibTown and Maluma.

Naty Botero, is a singer and composer from the city of Medellín, known for interpreting pop and Latin pop songs. Some of her main hits are Te Quiero Mucho, Dinosaurio, Mio and Adicta, among others. She have worked on musical productions with Colombian artists such as Joe Arroyo, ChocQuibTown and Andrés Cabas and artists from other countries such as Felix da Housecat. She also has a foundation called Coraje, to help the native people of the Sierra Nevada de Santa Marta.

Other famous pop singers include artists such as Soraya, Anasol, Paula Arenas, Lucas Arnau, Marbelle, Ali Stone and more recently, Sebastián Yatra.

=== Colombian urban and hip-hop ===
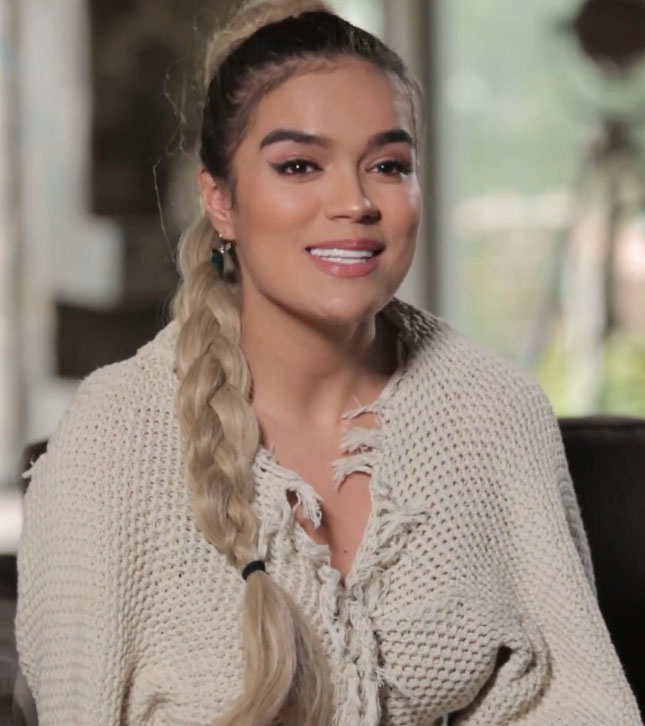
Karol G

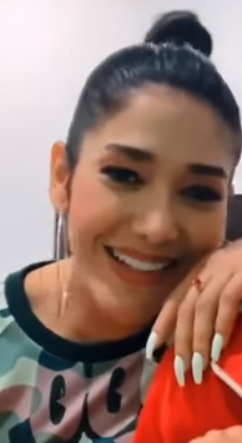
Farina

Hip-hop came to Colombia in the late 1980s when a few US hip-hop tracks by N.W.A and MC Hammer spurred a break-dancing fever among the young of the less privileged areas of major cities such as Medellín, Cali and Bogotá. Towards the end of this decade groups began to form, eventually leading to complete album productions in the mid-1990s. La Etnnia and Gotas de Rap were two of the various hip-hop groups that emerged and are widely considered as the pioneers of Colombian rap. Promoting a very independent style, both groups expressed extreme political and social views, protesting violence, corruption, inequality and hardships in the marginalized regions of Colombia. Then Asilo 38 from Cali come onto the scene with the albums, La Hoguera (2000) and La Descarga (2002), presenting a more commercial and polished sound, while still retaining strong socio-political messages.
It is about this time that Reggaeton from Puerto Rico surges in popularity and hip-hop in Colombia takes a back seat for a while as artists try their hand at the new controversial sound. Artist(s) such as Tres Pesos, J Balvin, Maluma, Reykon y Yelsid have established themselves in this genre and hits such as "Baila (Negra de trasero grande)" by Leka el Poeta and the explixcitly worded "La Quemona" and "Micaela" by Master Boy take the country by storm. Even the first ever Colombian X Factor in 2006 produces a Reggaeton singer called Farina Pao Paucar Franco who places third in the competition.

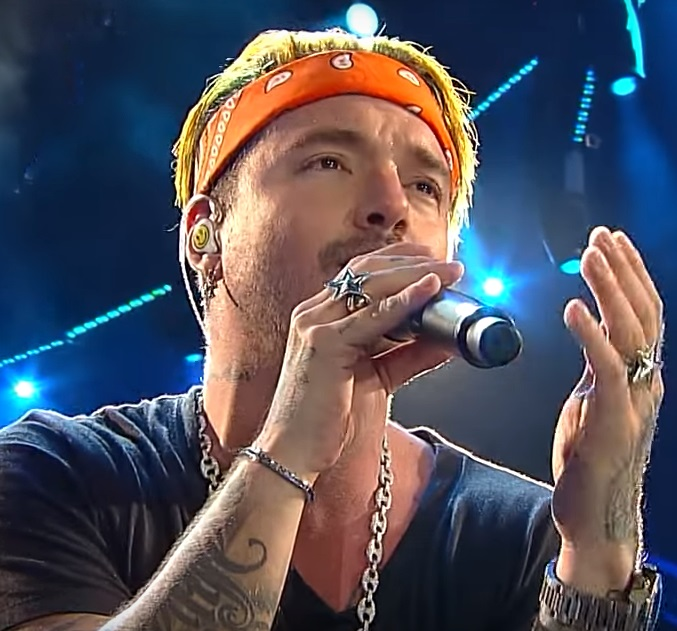
J Balvin

Karol G is a Colombian reggaetón singer who has done collaborations with other reggaetón singers, such as J Balvin, Bad Bunny, and Maluma. Throughout her career, Karol G has had troubles in the industry because reggaetón is a genre that is dominated by male artists. She recounts how when starting her career she noticed that there weren't many opportunities for her in the genre because reggaeton was dominated by male artists. In 2018, Karol G's single "Mi Cama" became very popular and she made a remix with J Balvin and Nicky Jam. The "Mi Cama" remix appeared in the top 10 Hot Latin Songs and number 1 in Latin Airplay charts. This year she has collaborated with Maluma called Creeme and with Anuel AA in "Culpables". The single, "Culpables" has been in the top 10 Hot Latin Songs for 2 consecutive weeks.

Reggae and hip-hop have expanded within Colombia through domestic artists and international collaborations. Reggae gained traction in the Colombian Caribbean islands of San Andrés and Providencia, influenced by Spanish reggae from Panama, with acts such as Voodoo Soul Jah, Nawal, and Alerta Kamarada performing internationally. In hip-hop, the Afro-Colombian group ChocQuibTown introduced a fusion of traditional Pacific Colombian rhythms in 2006, paving the way for other urban acts like Jiggy Drama from San Andrés. Additionally, several artists of Colombian origin operate internationally within the urban music genre, including Aztek Escobar, Colombian Party Cartel, Tres Coronas, Adassa, and members of Culcha Candela.

== See also ==
- Glossary of Colombian music
- Colombian rock
- Muisca music

== Other sources ==
- Brill, Mark. Music of Latin America and the Caribbean, 2nd Edition, 2018. Taylor & Francis ISBN 1138053562
- Burton, Kim. "El Sonido Dorado". 2000. In Broughton, Simon and Ellingham, Mark with McConnachie, James and Duane, Orla (Ed.), World Music, Vol. 2: Latin & North America, Caribbean, India, Asia and Pacific, pp 372–385. Rough Guides Ltd, Penguin Books. ISBN 1-85828-636-0
