= Urban champeta =

Colombian genre of folk music and dance

- Cultural origins: African, Antilles, Colombian
- Typical instruments: Vocals, percussion, bass, electric guitar, synthesizer, keyboards

Regional scenes
- Colombia

Local scenes
- Cartagena, Palenque of San Basilio

Urban champeta is a subgenre of folk music and dance originating in the Atlantic coastal regions of Colombia, combining sounds of reggae, hip hop, dancehall, African rhythms, and contemporary electronic sounds.

== Evolution of the genre ==
The origin of champeta began in the 1970s when commercial boats brought African music to the coast of Cartagena. African rhythms such as the soukous, highlife, mbguanga and other Caribbean rhythms such as the zouk and soca came to the coasts of Colombia. Champeta was created by adapting these rhythms to the urban life of Cartagena, who created an authentic sound of their own based on their life experiences and urban living. Groups have revolutionized champeta during its 30 years of evolution, such as Son Palenque and Anne Zwin, whose contributions made champeta a triumphant rhythm of the Carnaval de Barranquilla in the '80s. At the beginning of the year 2000, champeta rhythms became widely popular in Colombia, and a new style of champeta named "urban champeta" gave birth to a new wave of artists. The adaptation of urban champeta grew in popularity with hits such as "La Voladora" by El Sayayin, "Busco alguien que me quiera" by El Afinato, "La descontinuada" by Hernan Hernandez and other songs that made a new movement throughout the Colombian Pacific, with artists such as Bomba Estereo, Monsieur Bugalú, Elio Boom, Álvaro El Bárbaro, Mister Black, Dogardisc, Melchor Torres, El Pupy, Charles King, Louis Towers, Kassiba, Oscar William and Rafael Chávez.

== Musical setup ==
The main instruments of this genre are electric drums, guitars, bass, congas and synths with added African rhythms. Urban champeta is characterized by using samples blended with basic champeta rhythms. Accompanying the music is a sensual dance performed with the partner's legs crossed with one another without lifting their feet off the ground while moving to the sound of the music.

== Social issues ==
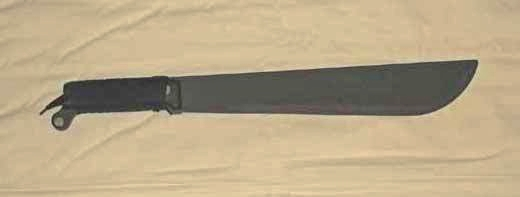
Champeta knife or machetilla.

"Champetúo" was a discriminatory name given by the high classes of society in Cartagena, referring to African descendants that lived in low-income neighborhoods. The name came about because they carried a large knife, which they called themselves the word Bantu "champeta". Charles King, a pioneer in the genre, mentioned that "Champeta is a genre that represents the identity of a community that was stigmatized by the high societies in Cartagena whose judgement was meant to submit this community to social slavery."

== Performers ==
Abril and Soto (2004) identify "champeta stars" as those artists who have transcended their local background and signed contracts with prominent national and international music companies. These include "El Sayayín" (Jhon Jairo Sayas), "Mr. Black El Presidente Del Genero" (Edwin Antequera), "El Afinaito" (Sergio Liñan), "Álvaro El Bárbaro" (Álvaro Zapata), "Elio Boom" (Francisco Corrales), "El Intelectual" Kevin Florez, Twister El Rey, "Yao & Zaa" Viviano Torres, "El Indestructible", Eddy Jey, among others. Torres joined the first singers of the genre to form the group Anne Swing, which achieved international fame in the late 1980s, appearing in the United States' top 40. More recent performers include "El Jhonky el profeta" (Jhon Einster Gutíerrez Cassianis), who died in 2005; "El Michel", who created an anthem-like song about the champeta way of life; Leo Fenix, Karly Way and El Oveja.
