= Fer Ariza =

Colombian singer and songwriter

- Ariza in 2025

Background information
- Born: Johan Fernando Ariza Pretel
- Origin: Medellín, Colombia
- Genres: Urban merengue, Latin pop, tropical music
- Occupations: Singer, songwriter
- Instrument: Vocals
- Years active: 2010–present
- Website: ferarizamusic.com

Fer Ariza, born Johan Fernando Ariza Pretel, is a Colombian singer and songwriter from Medellín. His music combines elements of merengue, urban music, Latin pop and tropical rhythms. Billboard Colombia has described him as “The King of Urban Merengue”.

== Biography ==
Ariza was born in the San Javier neighborhood of Medellín, Colombia. He began his musical career during his teenage years, initially influenced by reggaeton and later moving toward urban merengue.

In 2024, Ariza promoted the single “Dos Personalidades” in Puerto Rico, where he discussed his interest in making what he described as clean music within the urban genre.

In 2025, he collaborated with the Venezuelan duo Chyno & Nacho on “Niña Bonita 2”. According to Revista Vea, the collaboration followed his work with Nacho on “Love Pa Ti No Hay” and was presented as a continuation of Chyno & Nacho’s original song “Niña Bonita”. “Love Pa Ti No Hay” was covered by the Miami New Times, which described it as a tropical breakup anthem.

== Musical style ==
Ariza’s musical style combines merengue, urban music, Latin pop and tropical influences. Billboard Colombia reported that songs such as “Dos Personalidades” and “Enamora2” appeared on Billboard’s Latin Airplay chart, while describing his work as part of a broader effort to position urban merengue from Medellín.

Revista Vea described his sound as urban merengue with tropical roots and noted that his artistic identity has been shaped by his connection to Colombian rhythms and family-oriented themes. Colombian outlet KienyKe highlighted his focus on positive lyrics as an alternative to the explicit content common in urban music.

== Discography ==
=== Studio albums ===
Year	Title
2026	El Nuevo Rey

=== Extended plays ===
Year	Title
2025	Bailaito

=== Singles ===
Year	Title
2026	"Somos Latinos"
2026	"Vuela Alto"
2025	"Merengueando en Manrique"
2025	"El Discman"
2025	"Niña Bonita 2"
2025	"Love Pa Ti No Hay"
2025	"Simplemente Bella"
2025	"Enamora2"
2024	"Ferrari 5 Stars Vol. 1"
2024	"Sorneros"
2024	"Dos Personalidades"

== See also ==
- Merengue music
- Music of Colombia
