= List of Billboard Regional Mexican Albums number ones of 2010 =

Regional Mexican Albums is a record chart published in Billboard magazine that features Latin music sales information for regional styles of Mexican music. This data are compiled by Nielsen SoundScan from a sample that includes music stores, music departments at department stores and verifiable sales from concert venues in the United States.

== Albums ==
Issue date	Album	Artist(s)	Reference(s)
January 2	Dos Mundos: Evolución + Tradición	Alejandro Fernández	
January 9	Dos Mundos: Evolución + Tradición	Alejandro Fernández	
January 16	La Gran Señora	Jenni Rivera	
January 23	La Gran Señora	Jenni Rivera	
January 30	La Gran Señora	Jenni Rivera	
February 6	¡Ando Bien Pedo!	Banda Los Recoditos	
February 13	¡Ando Bien Pedo!	Banda Los Recoditos	
February 20	¡Ando Bien Pedo!	Banda Los Recoditos	
February 27	¡Ando Bien Pedo!	Banda Los Recoditos	
March 6	¡Ando Bien Pedo!	Banda Los Recoditos	
March 13	¡Ando Bien Pedo!	Banda Los Recoditos	
March 20	¡Ando Bien Pedo!	Banda Los Recoditos	
March 27	San Patricio	The Chieftains featuring Ry Cooder	
April 3	San Patricio	The Chieftains featuring Ry Cooder	
April 10	San Patricio	The Chieftains featuring Ry Cooder	
April 17	San Patricio	The Chieftains featuring Ry Cooder	
April 24	Solamente Tú	Duelo	
May 1	Quiero Decirte Que Te Amo Amo	El Trono de México	
May 8	Quiero Decirte Que Te Amo Amo	El Trono de México	
May 15	Los Locos Del Corrido	Los Titanes	
May 22	Juan Gabriel	Juan Gabriel	
May 29	Juan Gabriel	Juan Gabriel	
June 5	Amarte a la Antigua	Pedro Fernández	
June 12	LarryMania	Larry Hernandez	
June 19	Amarte a la Antigua	Pedro Fernández	
June 26	Amarte a la Antigua	Pedro Fernández	
July 3	Amarte a la Antigua	Pedro Fernández	
July 10	Amarte a la Antigua	Pedro Fernández	
July 17	Solo Junto A Ti	Conjunto Atardecer	
July 24	Amarte a la Antigua	Pedro Fernández	
July 31	Amarte a la Antigua	Pedro Fernández	
August 7	Millonario De Amor	Sergio Vega	
August 14	Millonario De Amor	Sergio Vega	
August 21	Millonario De Amor	Sergio Vega	
August 28	Del Rancho Para el Mundo	Espinoza Paz	
September 4	Del Rancho Para el Mundo	Espinoza Paz	
September 11	Del Rancho Para el Mundo	Espinoza Paz	
September 18	Del Rancho Para el Mundo	Espinoza Paz	
September 25	Del Rancho Para el Mundo	Espinoza Paz	
October 2	Del Rancho Para el Mundo	Espinoza Paz	
October 9	Del Rancho Para el Mundo	Espinoza Paz	
October 16	Del Rancho Para el Mundo	Espinoza Paz	
October 23	El Hombre Que Más Te Amó	Vicente Fernández	
October 30	El Hombre Que Más Te Amó	Vicente Fernández	
November 6	El Hombre Que Más Te Amó	Vicente Fernández	
November 13	El Hombre Que Más Te Amó	Vicente Fernández	
November 20	El Hombre Que Más Te Amó	Vicente Fernández	
November 27	El Hombre Que Más Te Amó	Vicente Fernández	
December 4	El Árbol	Los Tucanes de Tijuana	
December 11	El Árbol	Los Tucanes de Tijuana	
December 18	El Árbol	Los Tucanes de Tijuana	
December 25	El Árbol	Los Tucanes de Tijuana	
