= Dogardisc =

Colombian champeta singer and songwriter (died 2026)

- Born: Ismael Simancas; Cartagena, Colombia
- Died: 15 January 2026 Cartagena, Colombia
- Genres: Champeta

Ismael Simancas (died 15 January 2026), known by the stage name Dogardisc, was a Colombian champeta singer and songwriter.

== Life and career ==
Ismael Simancas was born in 1962 in Cartagena, in the Colombian department of Bolívar. He was an important figure in the Colombian coastal genre of champeta; various sources call him a pioneer of champeta, and El Tiempo described him as "one of the most recognised voices in the genre".

Dogardisc had a music career lasting more than 30 years, mostly as a singer but also for 5 years as a percussionist. His notable songs include "El Viejo Zorro", "El Cachaco Faltón", "La Mona Lisa", and "Desplazado de Amor". He died on 15 January 2026, after spending several days in hospital in Cartagena.
