= Kuisi =

Indigenous Colombian flute

Woodwind instrument
- Other names: Gaita (Spanish); Kuisi bunsi (female); Kuisi sigi (male)
- Classification: Fipple flute (duct flute)
- Hornbostel–Sachs classification: 421.221.12 (End-blown flute with internal duct)
- Inventor: Indigenous peoples of Colombia
- Developed: Pre-Columbian

Related instruments
- Gaita, Carrizo

A kuisi (or kuizi) is a Native Colombian fipple (or duct) flute made from a hollowed cactus stem, with a beeswax and charcoal powder mixture for the head, with a thin quill made from the feather of a large bird for the mouthpiece. Seagull, turkey and eagle feathers are among the feathers commonly used.

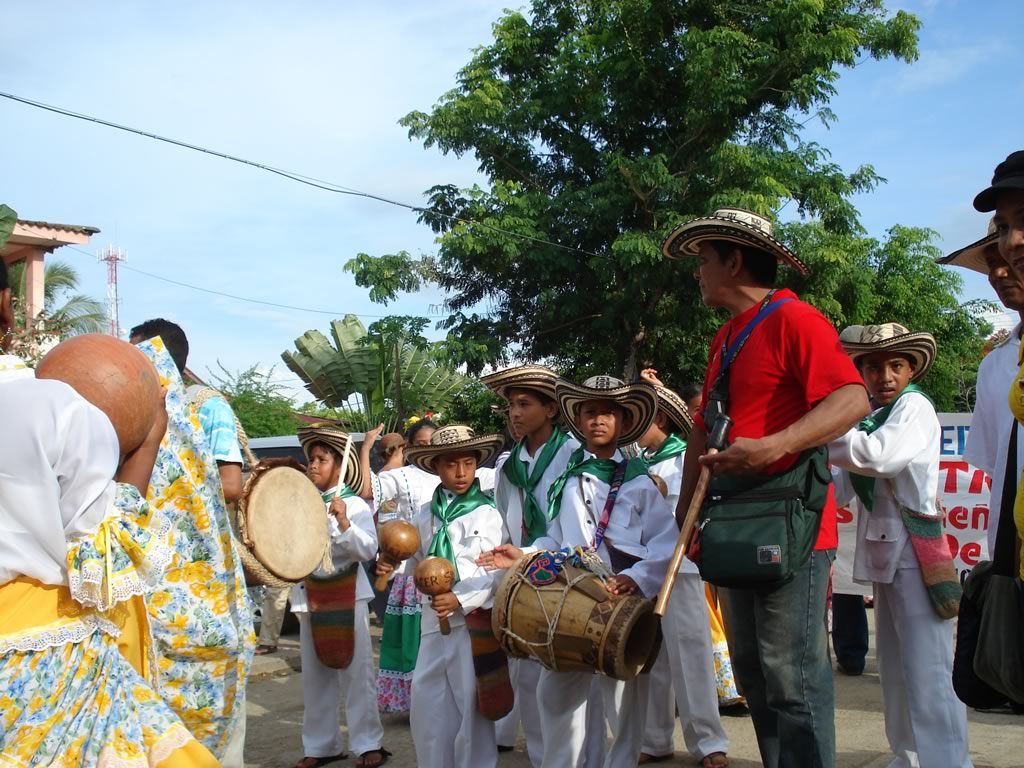
Gaitero at the Festival of Porro, Cordoba

== Kuisi bunsi and kuisi sigi ==
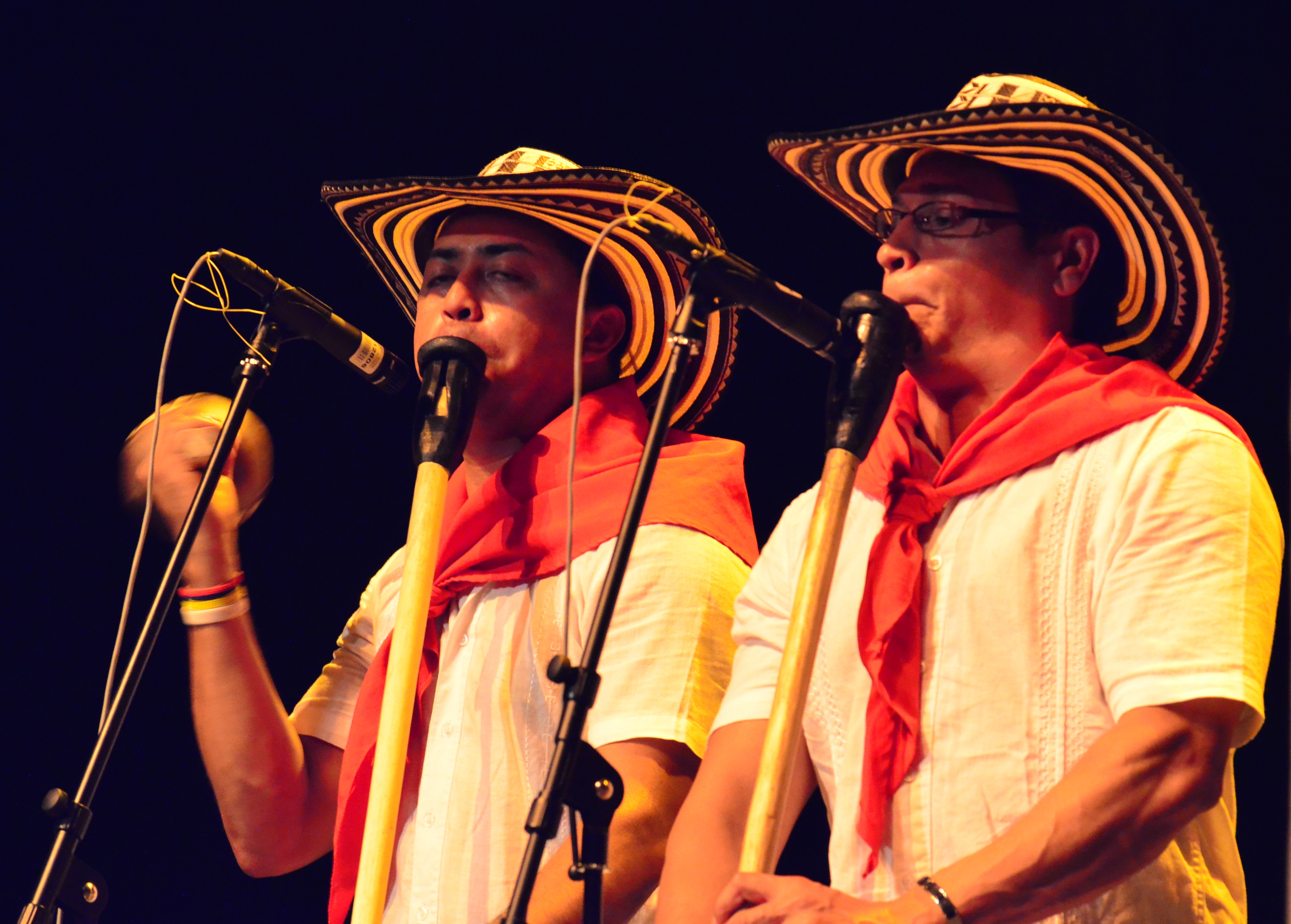
Los Gaiteros de San Jacinto (2012)

There are male and female versions of the kuisi (or gaita, the Spanish for pipe). The female kuisi bunsi (also rendered kuisi abundjí in Spanish) is also commonly known as a gaita hembra in Spanish, and has 5 holes; the male kuisi sigi (or kuisi azigí) is called a gaita macho in Spanish and has two holes.

Players often use wax to close fingerholes and alter the sound of the flute, blocking one or other tone hole on the kuisi sigi, and on the kuisi bunzi either the upper or lower fingerhole so that only four holes are in use at any one time. The change of wax from one fingerhole to another alters the fundamental tone and series of overtones that can be produced. A photograph of the paired flutes of the Guna Indians of Panama shows that their hembra has only four fingerholes.

== Construction ==
Modern Kuisis are between 70 and 80 centimetres long, a length traditionally defined by the arm length of the luthier. Kogi built kuisis are reported to be up to two feet, or 60 centimetres, long. and constructed from cane (carrizo) by the flautist himself (never a woman). The length being measured as 3 times the span between extended thumb and little finger plus the span between extended thumb and index finger. The holes are then located with a distance between them measured by the width of two fingers plus half the width of the thumb. They are constructed from a cactus (Selenicereus grandiflorus) which is bored and whose thorns are cut. The center is removed, first moistening and then boring with an iron stick. The cactus stem is thicker at one of its ends, this will go upside and coupled with the bee wax head which carries the feather mouth piece. Though the instrument is slightly conic on the outside, its perforation is cylindrical.

The kuisi bunsi has five tone holes, but only four of them are used when performing: the lower tone hole is rarely used, but when used, the upper tone hole is closed with wax. The lower tone hole of the kuisi sigi is rarely used.

The instrument's head, called a fotuto in Spanish, is made with bee wax mixed with charcoal powder to prevent the wax melting in high temperatures, which also gives the head it a characteristic black color. The mouth piece, a quill made from a large bird feather, is encrusted in this bee wax-charcoal head, with an angle and a distance to the edge of the air column which varies from instrument to instrument.

Since construction is not serial, the only instrument which matches the tuning of a particular kuisi bunsi (female) is the kuisi sigi (male) constructed to accompany it. Their lengths correspond and the position of the two tone holes of the kuisi sigi matches the position of the lower tone holes of the kuisi bunsi.

== Origins and traditional use ==
The earliest known use of kuisis is among Koguis and Ika of Sierra Nevada de Santa Marta. Similar flutes are also played in matched pairs by the Guna people who live around the Darien Gulf in both Colombia and Panama.

The male and female kuisi are traditionally played as a pair in counterpoint to one another; the kuisi sigi usually marking the beat and the kuisi bunsi playing the melody. They are usually accompanied by drums and the maraca. The player of the kuisi sigi often holds that in one hand and a maraca in the other, playing both simultaneously.

== Modern use in Colombian music ==
In lower slopes of the Sierra Nevada de Santa Marta, for example the Spanish-speaking village of Atánquez, similar flutes are called carrizos from the name of the cane from which they are made, and the ensemble is thus named conjunto de carrizos. This conjunto accompanies the dance chicote, a circle dance in which men and women alternate, placing their arms on each other's shoulders.

On the coastal plain, for example the town of San Jacinto, Bolívar, an ensemble known as the conjunto de gaitas commonly provides the music for the cumbia, porro, and other folk styles such as vallenato. This ensemble consists of two duct flutes (gaitas), a maraca, and two hand-beaten drums of African descent.

A Colombian historian writing in 1865 (Joaquín Posada Gutiérrez, Memorias histórico-politicas, Bogotá: Imprenta Nacional, 1929) has been cited (by Aquiles Escalante, El negro en Colombia, Monograflas sociologicas no. 18, Bogota: Universidad Nacional de Colombia, 1964, 149.) on the fusion of Native American, African and European instruments and music cultures:

...in the early part of the nineteenth century there were great festivities in honor of the patron saint of Cartagena, which at that time was the principal city of the region. At this festival the inhabitants of some wealth and position danced in a pavilion to the accompaniment of a regimental band. Those of the lower classes participated in one of two dances held in the open air. The dancers in one were blacks and pardos (individuals of mixed racial inheritance) and in the second Indians. The blacks and pardos participated in a circle dance of couples, much like the popular cumbia of this century. The dance of the Indians, on the other hand, was a closed circle in which men and women alternated and joined hands, a dance similar to the closed circle of the chicote as danced in Atánquez. The dance of the blacks was accompanied by two or three hand-beaten drums and a chorus of women who clapped. The dance of the Indians was accompanied by gaitas. By 1865 these two castes had lost their mutual antagonism and combined to dance what was then known as the mapalé. Players of gaitas and players of drums joined together to accompany this dance. This merging was apparently the origin of the conjunto de gaitas.

Notable contemporary Colombian performers playing kuisi flutes (or gaitas) include Los Gaiteros de San Jacinto. Emigrant Colombian groups in North American and Europe also perform with kuisis. The New York-based La Cumbiamba eNeYé perform with gaitas constructed by band member Martín Vejarano with mouthpieces made from the feathers of Canada geese sourced in a park in the Bronx. Spanish based Lumbalú, researching and updating of the different traditional coastal Colombian rhythms under the direction of kuisi bunsi player Hernando Muñoz Sánchez, mixing both traditional kuisis with modern instruments and musical styles.

== Modern use in world music ==
French archaic flautist Pierre Hamon, of the Alla Francesca ensemble, has also performed on the kuisi bunsi in Ritual1, Ritual 2 and Omaggio Kogui on the Hypnos album (2009).

== See also ==
- Glossary of Colombian music
