= Glossary of Colombian music =

This page is a glossary of Colombian music.

== A ==
- agüelulo – A teenage gathering, originally held in private homes and then larger spaces; a teenager who frequented such a place was a agüelero or sometimes a cocacolos, after the main beverage drunk at agüelulos, Coca-Cola
- música andina – An early national style of the 19th and early 20th centuries, developed from the Andean interior
- música antillana – A kind of popular dance music based on Cuban and Puerto Rican styles
- audición: literally listening, can refer to a "special musical tribute to the career of a particular artist or group", performed before the beginning of a concert

== B ==
- baile – Literally, dance, dances are alphabetized under their descriptor, e.g. baile de cuota is alphabetized under cuota
- bambuco – An Andean style of dance music, perceived as a national music in the early 20th century, or an Andean lyric music performed along with pasillo as a common part of the música andina repertoire
- balada – In popular music, refers to a kind of "Spanish romantic popular music", found across Latin America
- bandola – A stringed instrument similar to a mandolin, used in llanera and musica andina
- bandolin – A larger relative of the bandola
- bingo bailable – a dance that includes bingo games and salsa music
- bolero – A loose term for love ballads
- bombo – A drum used in folklore groups on the Atlantic coast, laid with sticks and used to start a performance by calling on the other drums to perform; a bass drum used in traditional cumbia ensembles
- bugalú – An early form of New York salsa, popular in Colombia during the 1960s, a fusion of son with rhythm and blues
- bullerengue – A Costeño form, performed by flute-and-drum ensembles
- The Colombian Mambo – the Colombian men would go to clubs and dance with each other until their legs fell off.

== C ==
- caja vallenata – A vallenato drum originally made from goatskin
- calle de las salsotecas – Literally, salsoteca street, referring to Calle 44, a three-mile-long road in Cali, referring to the numerous salsotecas and tabernas along the street, known for featuring salsa dura and Cuban music during the 1980s and 90s
- caballo – A rhythmic pattern played on the conga
- camaján – An alternate term for the pachuco
- campana – A cowbell
- campanero – A performer of the cowbell, notably played by audience members along with the on-stage performer
- capachos – Maracas
- música caribeña – A rarely used synonym for música antillana
- carrilera – A form of guitar-based music from the Antioquia province, associated "with the urbanizing peasant or working class"
- carrito – Small, streetside vendors of recorded music
- carrizo – A form of Colombian folk flute
- caseta – A dance hall
- cencerro – A timbales cowbell
- champeta – A form of rootsy music from the Atlantic coastal city of Cartagena, where an Afro-Colombian population developed the style; an Afro-Colombian style associated with Cartagena and Barranquilla, which combines elements of African pop, soca, zouk, mbaqanga and soukous
- champús bailable – A Caleño tradition of house parties, which began in the 1930s and were usually held on Sundays; champú, a beverage made from pineapple, corn, bitter orange leaves and a fruit called lulo
- chandé – A Costeño form, performed by flute-and-drum ensembles
- chirimía – A kind of ensemble found in the northwest corner of Chocó province
- chucu-chucu – An alternate term for raspa
- cokacolo – A teenage dancer at a agüelulo
- contrapunteo – An improvised, verbal duel
- música colombiana – Colombian music, formerly understood to refer to música andina in the 19th and early 20th century, when that style was perceived as a national music
- baile de cuota – A type of dance party in Cali's working-class neighborhoods during the mid-20th century
- cuatro – A small guitar, used in llanera
- currulao – A marimba-based music found along the southwest littoral Valle, Cauca and Nariño provinces of Colombia, as well as Esmeraldas in Ecuador
- cumbia – A form of nation music, originally from the Atlantic coast and characterized by a "solidly grounded and complex layered rhythm with an airily syncopated melody"

== E ==
- empanada bailable – An alternate term for champú bailable, referring to the empanadas often served

== F ==
- fandango – A Costeño song form, performed by flute-and-drum ensembles
- festivales – Community dances in Cali, held in neighborhood dance halls or pavilions
- fiesta patronales – Saints days
- flauto de millo – See millo, flauto de

== G ==
- gaita – A folk flute; a Costeño form, performed by flute-and-drum ensembles; conjunto de gaita is a traditional cumbia ensemble
- guabina – A kind of música andina
- guacharaca – A scraper, common in vallenato
- guache – Rattles made from filling metal or gourd tubes with seeds
- guateque – Originally a Cuban word referring to a rural campesino party, which came to refer to a form of salsa dura, characterized by "slow, grinding son montunos with heavy bass and percussion; associated also with El guateque de la salsa (The Salsa Party), a popular radio show from 1989 to 1993

== I ==
- música de la interior – An Andean style, often used synonymously with bambuco, characterized by a gentle and melodic sound and a well-developed melody at the expense of rhythmic complexity

== J ==
- joropo – Originally a folk dance performed in honor of saints days and other special occasions, such as birthdays and baptism; now more often a generic word for llanera based dance music; a courtship dance associated with central Colombia and that region's cowboy culture, a "dynamic, polyrhythmic mestizo style that fuses Andalusian, African and indigenous elements"

== K ==
- kiosco – A community pavilion, used for musical performances
- kuisi – an indigenous flute made from a hollowed cactus stem, with a beeswax and charcoal powder mixture for the head, with a quill made from a goose or turkey feather for the mouthpiece. There are male and female versions of the pipe (or gaita in Spanish), the female kuisi bunsi (or gaita hembra) with 5 holes, and the male kuisi sigi (or gaita macho) with two.

== L ==
- llamador – A drum, traditionally used in cumbia as well as modern música tropical
- llanera – A form of harp-led music

== M ==
- marimbula – A low-pitched thumb piano
- flauto de millo – A folk clarinet of the Atlantic coast
- melómano – A "music aficionado"
- música – Literally music, music forms are alphabetized by their descriptor, e.g. música antillana is alphabetized under antillana

== N ==
- música de negros – Literally black people's music, a pejorative term used by the elite to deride musics such as música antillana
- nueva ola – Literally new wave, a kind of pop-balada performed by romantic crooners, which peaked in the 1960s and 70s

== O ==
- orquesta – A dance band
- orquesta femenina – An all-female dance ensemble
- orquesta infantile – An all-child dance ensemble
- orquesta juvenile – An all-youth dance ensemble

== P ==
- pachanga – An early form of New York salsa, popular in Colombia during the 1960s, especially in the city of Cali
- pachuco – An iconic figure, a "ruffian and a hustler... an antihero", especially important in the culture surrounding the Zona de tolerancia
- parrandero – A typical lyrical focus of the more macho side of popular cumbia, referring to a boasting, aggressive and sexual "party-going man"
- pasillo – A lyric song form from the Andean region
- el paso Caleño – A traditional dance step from the city of Cali, characterized by a "rapid 'double-time' shuffle on the tips of the toes"
- pasta americana – Carrito slang referring to the thicker and higher quality vinyl of American records
- picó – Derived from the English pickup, a large sound system among DJs in Cartagena and Barranquilla during the 1980s
- pop tropical – A form of mid-1990s pop-salsa
- porro – A music genre. A village brass band; a song form performed by the flute-and-drum ensembles of the Atlantic coast region, as well as mid-20th century urban dance orquestas

== R ==
- raspa – A simplied form of música tropical which emerged in the late 1960s
- refajo – A street slang from the Zona de tolerancia in Cali
- rock en español – Spanish language rock music, most closely associated with the cities of Bogotá and Medellín in Colombia
- rumba – Partying or merry-making, compare to rumbero, a party

== S ==
- salsa – A Spanish Caribbean dance music created in New York City using elements of Afro-Cuban and Puerto Rican music, a combination known in Colombia as musica antillana
- salsíbiri – A term coined by Fruko to describe his own style
- salsómano – A salsa fan
- salsoteca – A venue that plays salsa
- serenata – A pan-Latin tradition of street serenades performed by small groups of instrumentalists, especially guitarists

== T ==
- tambor hembra – The lead drum of the Atlantic coast drum choirs
- tambor macho – A conga-like drum that leads the basic rhythm of the Atlantic coast drum choirs
- terapia – An alternate term for champeta
- musica tropical – A form of salsa-based music innovated by Joe Arroyo; a form of dance music based on various Atlantic coast genres
- tiple – A small stringed instrument, used in llanera and musica andina

== V ==
- vallenato – A form of accordion-based music, related to música tropical and cumbia, and originally associated with the Atlantic Coast
- vallenato-protesta – A form of vallenato-based protest song
- verbena – Free street parties held during the December Feria and sponsored by the city of Cali
- viejoteca – Dance parties, originally appearing in 1993 for senior citizens but later appealing to middle-aged partygoers and finally abandoning any age restrictions; these viejotecas became associated with a revival of the agüelulos and nightclub scenes of the 1960s and 70s; originally from Cali, viejotecas have spread to Medellin and Cartagena

== Z ==
- zarzuela – Operettas

== See also ==
- Music
