= Christian del Real =

Colombian musician

Cristian Del Real is a professional musician, born in 1989 in Cartagena, Colombia. Del Real started his career when he was just 3 years old and was known at that time as "El Niño Genio Del Timbal" (Spanish for Genius Child of Timbal). Del Real played timbal with several of the most recognized salsa music stars.

At age 17 Del Real started to play classical piano as an autodidact. Del Real won the second prize in the Colombian National Piano festival in Bucaramanga in 2009.

In 2008 he traveled to Bogotá, Colombia to attend formal piano studies at University Juan N. Corpas. In August 2013, Del Real won the International Piano festival in Bogotá, Colombia. The prize included representing his country in the Changchun International Piano festival in May 2014.

In 2014 Cristian was laureate at the Federico Chopin Piano Contest in Colombia
