= Los Nemus del Pacífico =

Colombian salsa music band

Los Nemus del Pacífico are a Colombian salsa music band. They are especially known for son montuno music, as highlighted in their video Los Nemus Del Pacifico: Greatest Hits of Salsa & Son Montuno on Discos Fuentes (2005).

== Discography ==
- Grandes Exitos (1995)
