= Los Titanes =

Colombian salsa music band

Los Titanes are a Colombian salsa music band. The group was founded in Barranquilla in 1981 by the trombonist Alberto Barros.

== Discography ==
- 1981: Los Titanes y Sus Invitados
- 1982: Los Titanes
- 1985: Llegaron los Titanes
- 1986: Furor Bailable
- 1988: Apriétala
- 1989: Sobredosis de Amor y Salsa
- 1990: Amor y Salsa
- 1991: Tentación
- 1993: En Su Salsa
- 1993: Bastó Una Mirada
- 1994: 6a. Avenida
- 1995: El Titán de la Salsa
- 1995: Grandes Éxitos de Salsa
- 1996: Rompiendo Esquemas
- 1998: Salsa al Máximo Voltaje
- 1999: Tributo a Héctor Lavoe "La Voz"
- 2001: Salsa Magic
- 2001: Tremenda Salsa
- 2003: Salsa Super Power
- 2003: Heavy Salsa
- 2008: Mano a Mano
- 2010: Los Locos Del Corrido
- 2010: Tributo a la Salsa Colombiana Vol. 3
- 2011: Essential de Tributo a la Salsa Colombiana
- 2012: Tributo a la Salsa Colombiana Vol. 4
- 2013: Tributo a la Salsa Colombiana Vol. 5
