= Champeta =

Colombian musical genre

- Stylistic origins: Chalusonga (Colombian chalupa combined with Afro-Cuban percussive music); African rhythms (soukous, highlife, mbaqanga, juju); Antilles rhythms (rap-raggareggae, compás haitiano); Afro-Colombian and indigenous influences (bullerengue, mapalé, zambapalo)
- Cultural origins: Early-1980s, Cartagena, Colombia
- Typical instruments: Voice, percussion, bass, electric guitar, synthesiser, keyboard

Subgenres
- Champeta criolla, champeta urbana, champeta africana

Regional scenes
- Colombia

Local scenes
- Cartagena, Palenque of San Basilio, Barranquilla

Champeta, also known as terapia, is a musical genre and dance that originated in the Caribbean coast of Colombia in the early 1980s. It developed from an earlier style termed chalusonga, which originated in Palenque de San Basilio in the mid-1970s. Chalusonga was a combination of Colombian chalupa and Afro-Cuban percussive music popularized by Estrellas del Caribe. When their music reached Cartagena de Indias, it evolved into champeta, which became a movement and identity among Afro-Colombians. It shows influences from African colonial settlements and from contemporary African culture, particularly from the Democratic Republic of the Congo.

== Musical characteristics ==
In champeta music, the rhythmic base dominates over the melodic and harmonic lines, producing a music easy to dance to and marked by its strength and plasticity. The instruments used include the voice, percussion, electric guitar, bass, conga drums, and the synthesiser, which contributes rhythmic effects. This musical form is characterised by a division into three sequential parts: the introductory music, the chorus, and el Espeluque, marked by powerful repetitive rhythms and usually accompanied by placas, interruptions counter to the rhythm. Song lyrics often display the rebellious attitude of Cartagena people of African descent, challenging social and economic exclusion or relating their dreams of change and progress.

== History ==
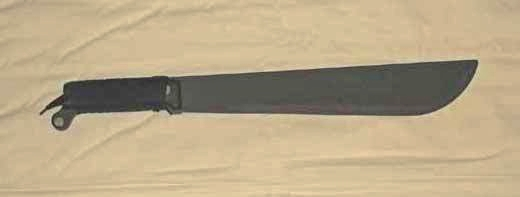
Champeta knife or machetilla.

The word champeta originally denoted a short, curved, monkey-killing knife of the same name used in the region at work, in the kitchen, and as an offensive weapon. The word is first known to have been used as a cultural identifier in the 1920s. Socio-cultural researchers and sociologists have established that at some time before the 1920s the term champetudo started to be applied to residents of the more outlying districts of Cartagena, who tended to be poorer and of African descent. The term was applied by the economic elite with the intention of disparaging this surviving culture, with associations of vulgarity, poverty and blackness. Thus champeta refers to a culture whose history is marked by slavery and mistreatment.

At the start of the 1970s, champeta culture became better-known in Colombia due to the development of a set of complex dances set to the rhythms of salsa and jíbaro and later reggae, as well as progressively more foreign or novel dance genres as providers competed for exclusivos, records other groups did not have in their library. This music was played at full volume through big loudspeakers known locally as picós (from the English word pick-up) by troupes of the same name. These early dances were called "therapy" for their relaxing nature, a distraction from the economic problems of the country.

Around 1981, "creole therapy" emerged as a musical genre to be performed and sung. Among its sources of inspiration was recorded music brought into the port of Cartagena from Africa and from other African settlements. Its first composers were people of African descent from Cartagena and Palenque de San Basilio, later joined by songwriters and entrepreneurs from Barranquilla and other parts of Colombia. It consisted in a fusion of African rhythms (soukous, highlife, mbaqanga, juju) with those from the Antilles (ragga, compás haitiano, also influenced by music of Indigenous and Afro-Colombian origins (bullerengue, mapalé, zambapalo and chalupa). This style of music came to be known as "Colombian therapy" and finally took on the name of the champeta culture. During the 1990s champeta underwent further changes in its musical and other content, with the introduction of digital techniques and placas (interruptions counter to the rhythm). Despite its social origins, champeta came to be as much appreciated as rejected by the social elite.

In 2000 Champeta music had a breakthrough in the Colombian Caribbean region's market with John Sayas "El sayayín" leading the movement.

== Cultural aspects ==
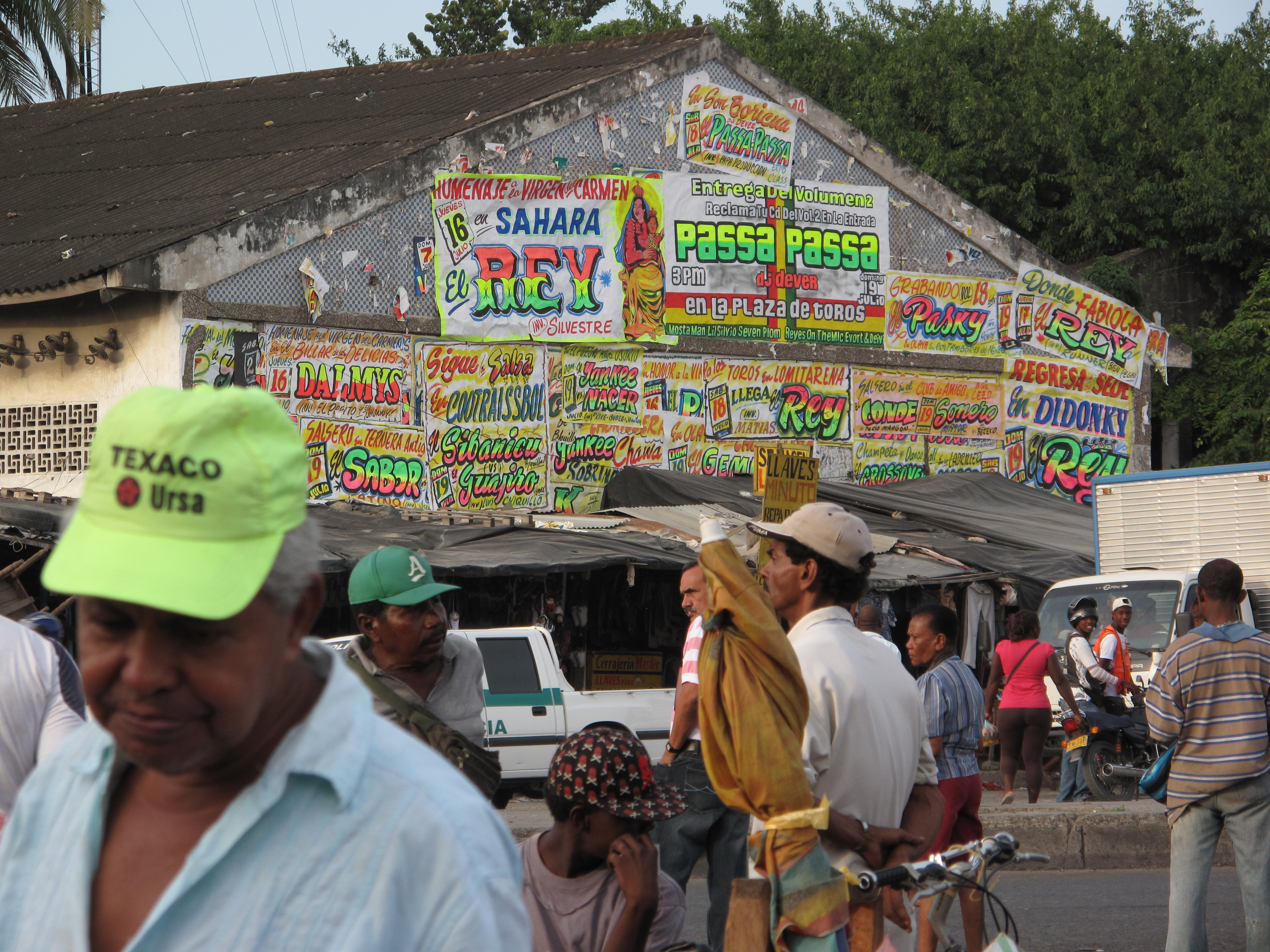
Posters advertising a Champeta concert in the market of Bazurto in Cartagena de Indias

The standard conception of champeta includes four central aspects: musical expression, the distinctive language, the loudspeakers (picós), and the perreos – celebrations. Some give equal importance to other aspects such as dance, political activism, costume, or videos. More recently this cultural phenomenon has spread to other art forms such as cinema, literature and the plastic arts.

In Colombia there are many nightclubs where people can go dancing to the sound of champeta music.

- In Cartagena de Indias, in the Bazurto neighbourhood, there is a place called Bazurto Social Club, next to the Centenario park, where live bands play champeta near the colourful walls that relate to Cartagena's history.
- In Bogotá, in the zona rosa, there is a popular bar called Campanario, where a live band plays all the tropical rhythms such as champeta, reggaeton, reggae, and even calypso.

== Performers ==
Abril and Soto (2004) identify as "champeta stars" those artists who have transcended their local background and signed contracts with big national and international music companies. These include "El Sayayín" (Jhon Jairo Sayas), "El Yinker" (Jordan García), "Mr. Black El Presidente Del Genero" (Edwin Antequera), "El Afinaito" (Sergio Liñan), "Álvaro El Bárbaro" (Álvaro Zapata), "Elio Boom" (Francisco Corrales), "El Intelectual" Kevin Florez, Twister El Rey, "Yao & Zaa" Viviano Torres, Eddy Jey, among others. Torres joined the first singers of the genre to form the group Anne Swing, which achieved international fame at the end of the 1980s, appearing in the United States Top 40. More recent performers include "El Jhonky el profeta" (Jhon Einster Gutíerrez Cassianis), who died in 2005; "El Michel", who created an anthem-like song about the champeta way of life; Leo Fenix, Karly Way and El Oveja.

Champeta has also permeated the pop and salsa music scene in Colombia. For example, singer Carlos Vives adopted the genre in the song "Pa' Maite" and shows some of this influence elsewhere. Similarly, salsa singer Joe Arroyo, aiming to highlight what is of African or indigenous origin in the Caribbean and Cartagena, combines various African musical influences such as champeta, and is described on many of his discs as champetuo, for example La rebelión.

== Champeta in cinema and TV ==
- Cimarrones al filo de la champeta (2008) produced and directed by Jorge Benítez, was the first film about champeta culture to be based on the everyday life and the stereotype of the "champetudo".
- La gorra, film made by Andres Lozano Pineda also in 2008.
- Bandoleros (2006) directed by Erlyn Salgado recognised by the journalist Ricardo Chica and the researcher Rafael Escallón as the first film to display champeta culture. It was filmed using a cellphone and a Handycam camera, and is notable for having been distributed through informal markets, as is normal for Therapy music.
- Bazurto (2014), a series directed by Liliana Bocanegra and Carlos María Urrea. Champeta and its culture have a direct influence on the plot. The protagonists are caught up in a major heist, which uses the frenzy surrounding an international champeta competition as a cover. The lead character, Flora, is presented as an accomplished dancer of this musical genre.
- Champeta, el ritmo de la Tierra (2025), a comedy-drama series directed by Riccardo Gabrielli R. and produced by Vista Productions for The Walt Disney Company. In the plot of the series, champeta manifests a mysterious power that selects a pair of young dance enthusiasts to defend the environment—and all forms of life—against an evil corporation.

== Bibliography ==
- Marion Provenzal, Claudia Mosquera (2000). Construcción de identidad Caribeña popular en Cartagena de Indias a través de la música y el baile de la champeta [Construction of a Caribbean identity for people of Cartagena through Champeta music and dance, vol. 3, pp. 98-114] (in Spanish).
- Nicolás R. Contreras Hernández (2002). Champeta-Terapia: un pretexto para revisitar las ciudadanías culturales en el Gran Caribe (En: Champeta-Terapia: an excuse for revisiting cultural citizenships in the Greater Caribbean), Comfamiliar.
- Elisabeth Cunin (2003). Identidades a flor de piel: lo "negro" entre apariencias y pertenencias: categorías raciales y mestizaje en Cartagena(En: Skin-deep Identities: "blackness" between appearances and possessions: miscegenation and racial categories in Cartagena, Ch, 5, Instituto Colombiano de Antropología e Historia, Universidad de los Andes, Instituto Francés de Estudios Andinos, Observatorio del Caribe Colombiano, Bogotá Web.
- Carmen Abril, Mauricio Soto (2004). Colección economía y cultura [Economic and cultural collection] (in Spanish). Bogotá: Observatorio del Caribe Colombiano, Convenio Andrés Bello. ISBN 958-698-149-5.
- Eduardo Restrepo, Axel Rojas (eds.) (2004). Conflicto e (In)visibilidad: Retos en los estudios de la gente negra en Colombia (En: Conflict and (In)visibility: Challenges in the study of black people in Colombia): Elisabeth Cunin, discográfica de Cartagena de la esclavitud al multiculturalismo: el antropólogo, entre identidad rechazada e identidad instrumentalizada, p. 24 and 148; Carlos Efren Agudelo, no todos vienen del rio: construcción de identidades negras urbanas y movilización política en Colombia, p. 191. Editorial Universidad del Cauca.Web
- Adolfo González Henríquez, Carmen Abril (2005). Entre la Espada y la Pared, el futuro económico y cultural de la industria discográfica de Cartagena (En: On the Horns of a Dilemma: the economic and cultural future of the recorded music industry of Cartagena, Vol, 1, No. 2, Convenio Andrés Bello y el Observatorio del Caribe, Web.
- R. Escallón Miranda (2007). La Polarización de la Champeta: Investigación que motivó el reconocimiento de esta cultura y de este género en el Salón Regional y Nacional de Colombia (En: The Polarization of Champeta), Roztro - Museo de Arte Moderno de Cartagena, Vol, 1, no. 2.
- Michael Birenbaum Quintero (2018). "Exchange, materiality and aesthetics in Colombian champeta." Ethnomusicology Forum, DOI: 10.1080/17411912.2018.1454842.
