= Soraya discography =

- Studio albums: 5
- Compilation albums: 4
- Singles: 15
- Music videos: 12

The discography of Soraya, who was a Colombian-American Latin pop singer-songwriter, consists of five studio albums and four compilation albums. Soraya has also released fifteen singles and twelve music videos.

Her first album, En Esta Noche/On Nights Like This, was released in 1996 by Universal Music, and was successful across Latin America, the United States and in Germany. Two more albums Torre de Marfil/Wall of Smiles and Cuerpo y Alma/I'm Yours were released by the same label over the next four years.

In 2000 Soraya was diagnosed with breast cancer and took time off from her career to fight the disease. Having seemingly recovered, she moved to EMI Music in 2002 and released Soraya the following year. Her fifth and final studio album El Otro Lado de Mi was released in 2005, by which point her cancer had returned, and Soraya died in May 2006.

== Albums ==
=== Studio albums ===
List of studio albums, with selected details
Title	Album details	Peak chart positions			Sales	Certifications
Title	Album details	GER	US Top Latin	US Latin Pop	Sales	Certifications
En Esta Noche/ On Nights Like This	Released: February 6, 1996 (US); Label: Island, Polydor; Format: CD, cassette	5	31	—	COL: 250,000 (Note: Worldwide sales figures for On Night Like This as of 1996.); GER: 100,000 (Note: Worldwide sales figures for On Nights Like This as of 2003.)	ASINCOL: Gold; FONOTICA: Gold; AMPROFON: Gold; APFV: Gold
Torre de Marfil/ Wall of Smiles	Released: October 21, 1997 (US); Label: Mercury; Format: CD, cassette	63	—	—		
Cuerpo y Alma/ I'm Yours	Released: May 6, 2000 (GER); Label: Mercury; Format: CD, cassette, digital download	—	—	—		
Soraya	Released: May 6, 2003 (US); Label: Capitol Latin; Format: CD, cassette, digital download	—	25	9		IFPI CHI: Gold
El Otro Lado de Mí	Released: March 1, 2005 (US); Label: Capitol Latin; Format: CD, digital download	—	—	—		

=== Compilation albums ===
List of compilation albums, with selected chart positions
Title	Album details
Éxitos Eternos	Released: May 10, 2005; Label: Universal Music; Formats: CD, Digital Download
Herencia	Released: June 27, 2006; Label: Universal Music; Formats: CD, Digital Download
Entre Su Ritmo y el Silencio	Released: July 7, 2006; Label: Capitol; Formats: CD, Digital Download

== Singles ==
=== As lead artist ===
List of singles, with selected chart positions, showing year released and album name
Title	Year	Peak chart positions				Album
Title	Year	AUS	GER	US Hot Latin	US Latin Pop	Album
"De Repente / Suddenly"	1996	—	64	5	1	En Esta Noche/ On Nights Like This
"Quédate / Stay Awhile"	1996	—	86	25	6	En Esta Noche/ On Nights Like This
"Amor en Tus Ojos / Love in Your Eyes"	1996	—	—	6	1	En Esta Noche/ On Nights Like This
"Avalancha" / "Avalanche"	1997	—	—	—	—	En Esta Noche/ On Nights Like This
"Lejos de Aquí" / "So Far Away"	1997	51	—	—	—	Torre de Marfil/Wall of Smiles
"Si Te Vas" / "If I Lose You"	1998	—	—	—	—	Torre de Marfil/Wall of Smiles
"París, Cali, Milán"	1998	—	—	—	—	Torre de Marfil/Wall of Smiles
"Torre de Marfil" / "Wall of Smilles'"	1999	—	—	—	—	Torre de Marfil/Wall of Smiles
"Cuerpo y Alma" / "I'm Yours"	2000	—	—	—	27	Cuerpo y Alma/I'm Yours
"¿En Dónde Estás?" / "Where Did You Go?"	2000	—	—	—	—	Cuerpo y Alma/I'm Yours
"Casi"	2003	—	—	1	2	Soraya
"Solo por Ti"	2003	—	—	18	13	Soraya
"Miento"	2004	—	—	—	—	Soraya
"Llévame"	2005	—	—	15	10	El Otro Lado de Mí
"¿Cómo Sería?"	2005	—	—	—	—	El Otro Lado de Mí
"—" denotes a title that was not released or did not chart in that territory

=== Promotional singles ===
List of promotional singles, showing year released and album name
Title	Year	Album
"Crossroads"	1998	Wall of Smiles
"You and I"	2001	Cuerpo y Alma / I'm Yours
"No One Else" / "Por Ser Quien Soy"	2002	—N/a
"Ser Amado"	2004	Soraya
"Sin Explicación"	2004	Soraya

== Videography ==
Title	Year
"De Repente/Suddenly"	1996
"Quedate/Stay Awhile"	1996
"Avalancha"	1997
"Lejos de Aquí/So Far Away/J'aimerais Tant"	1997
"Si Te Vas/If I Lose You"	1997
"Cuerpo y Alma/I'm Yours"	2000
"¿En Dónde Estás?/Where Did You Go?"	2000
"Casi/Almost"	2003
"Solo por Ti/All for You"	2003
"Miento"	2004
"Llévame/Lead Me"	2005
"¿Cómo Sería?"	2005
