= List of Billboard Latin Pop Airplay number ones of 1996 =

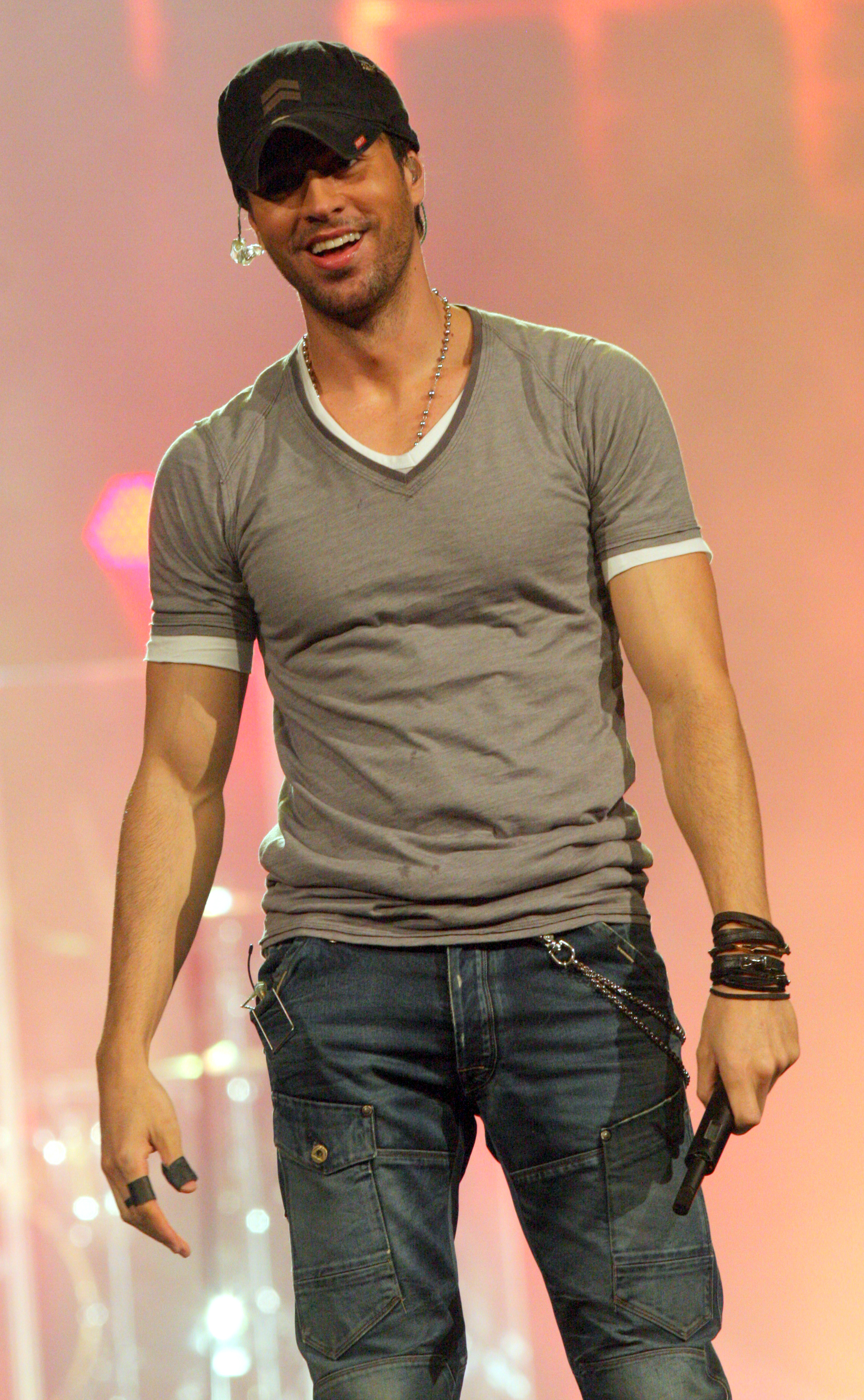
Enrique Iglesias's debut single "Si Tú Te Vas" became his first song to reach number one on the Latin Pop Airplay chart in 1996. He also had the best-performing song of the year with "Por Amarte".

Latin Pop Airplay is a chart that ranks the top-performing songs (regardless of genre or language) on Latin pop radio stations in the United States, published by Billboard magazine based on weekly airplay data compiled by Nielsen's Broadcast Data Systems. It is a subchart of Hot Latin Songs, which lists the best-performing Spanish-language songs in the country. In 1996, 16 songs topped the chart, in 52 issues of the magazine.

The first number one of the year was "Más Allá" by Gloria Estefan, which had been in the top spot since the issue dated December 30, 1995, and spent a total of three weeks at this position. Enrique Iglesias, Cristian Castro, Luis Miguel, and Soraya were the only acts to have more than one chart-topper in 1996. Iglesias's debut single, "Si Tú Te Vas", became his first chart-topper and spent two weeks at number one. He also had the best-performing Latin pop song of the year with "Por Amarte" despite it only spending one week at number one. Castro's self-penned track, "Amor", held the top spot for the longest in 1996 with 10 weeks. "Sueña", which spent four weeks at number one, is the Spanish-language adaptation of "Someday" from Disney's 1996 film The Hunchback of Notre Dame, which Miguel recorded for the Latin American edition of the movie's soundtrack. Soraya achieved her only number ones with "De Repente" and "Amor en Tus Ojos".

Other artists to top the chart for the first time in 1996 were Shakira with "Estoy Aquí" and Chayanne with "Solamente Tu Amor", while Olga Tañón, Amanda Miguel, and Eros Ramazzotti obtained their first and only chart-toppers in the year. Both "Estoy Aquí" and Ramazzotti's "La Cosa Más Bella" (originally recorded in Italian as "Più bella cosa") held the top spot for four weeks. "Ámame una Vez Más" by Amanda Miguel was number one song for the longest, at eight weeks, by a female act. It also won the Billboard Latin Music Award for Latin Pop Song of the Year in 1997. The final number one of the year was "Las Cosas Que Vives" by Laura Pausini, the Spanish-language version of her song "Le cose che vivi".

== Chart history ==
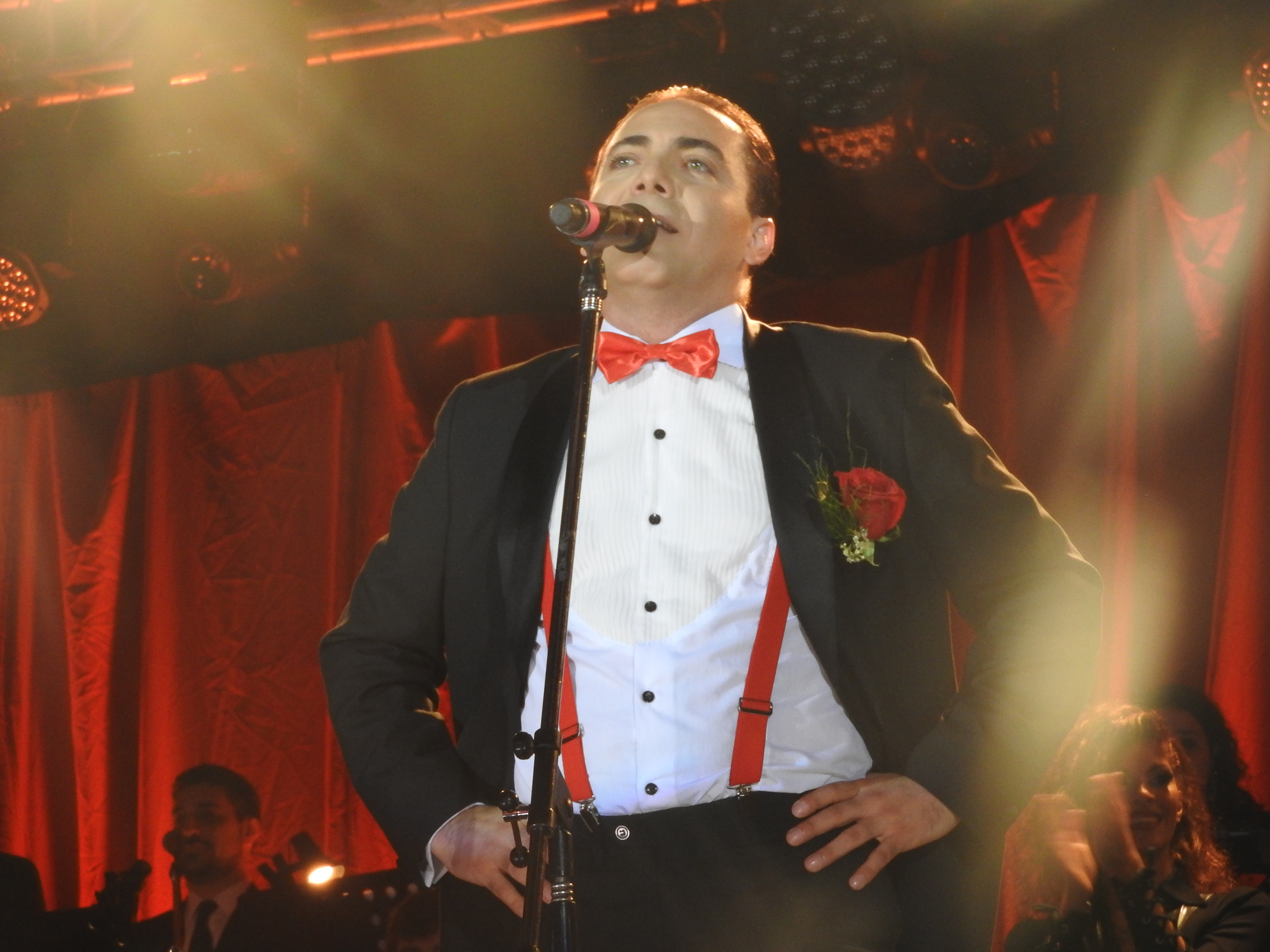
Cristian Castro had the longest-running number-one-song of 1996 with his self-penned track "Amor".

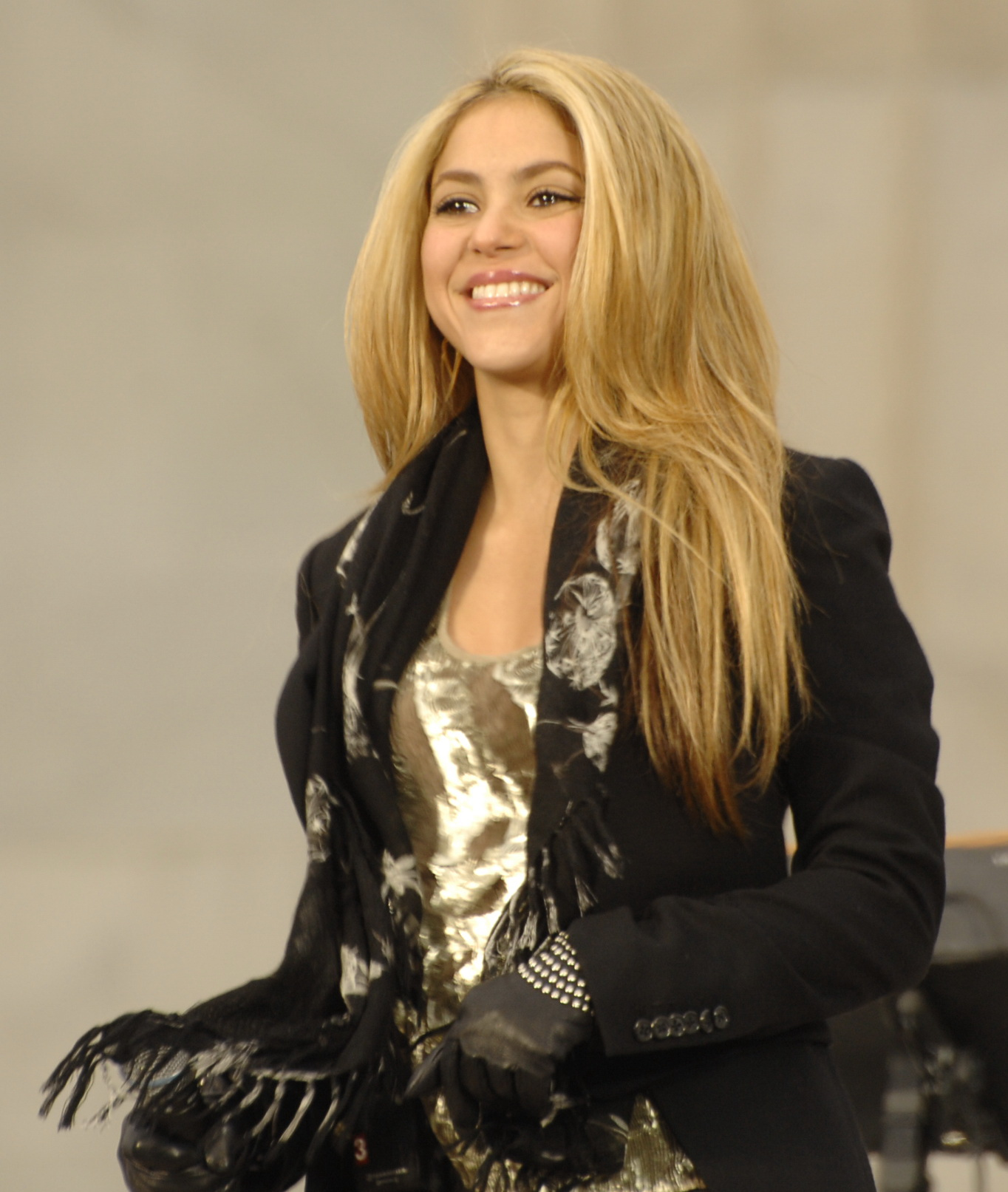
Shakira's "Estoy Aquí" was her first song to reach number one on the Latin Pop Airplay chart.

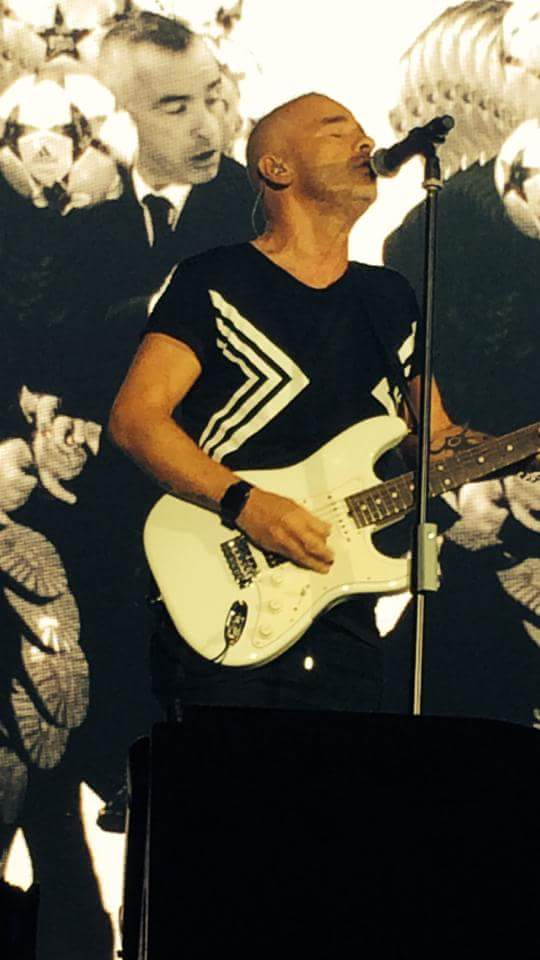
Eros Ramazzotti obtained his only chart-topper in 1996 with "La Cosa Más Bella".

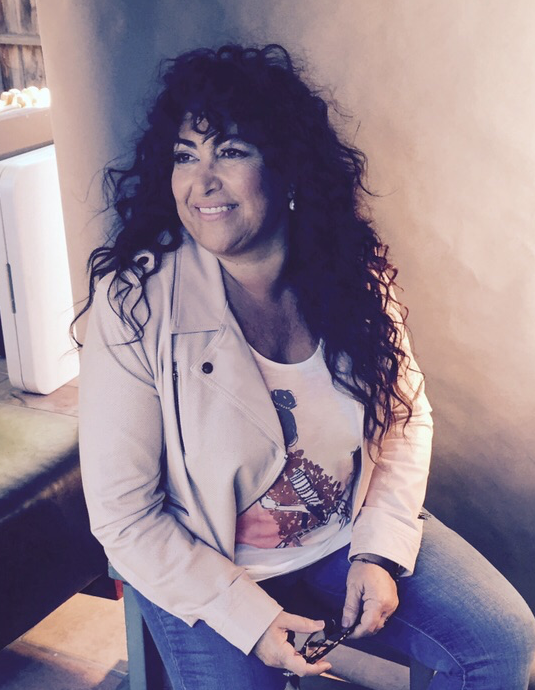
"Ámame una Vez Más" by Amanda Miguel had the most weeks at number one by a female artist.

Key
†	Indicates number 1 on Billboard's year-end Latin pop chart

Chart history
Issue date	Title	Artist(s)	Ref.
January 6	"Más Allá"	Gloria Estefan	
January 13	"Más Allá"	Gloria Estefan	
January 20	"Si Tú Te Vas"	Enrique Iglesias	
January 27	"Si Tú Te Vas"	Enrique Iglesias	
February 3	"Amor"	Cristian Castro	
February 10	"Amor"	Cristian Castro	
February 17	"Amor"	Cristian Castro	
February 24	"Amor"	Cristian Castro	
March 2	"Amor"	Cristian Castro	
March 9	"Amor"	Cristian Castro	
March 16	"Amor"	Cristian Castro	
March 23	"Amor"	Cristian Castro	
March 30	"Amor"	Cristian Castro	
April 6	"Amor"	Cristian Castro	
April 13	"Estoy Aquí"	Shakira	
April 20	"Estoy Aquí"	Shakira	
April 27	"Estoy Aquí"	Shakira	
May 4	"Estoy Aquí"	Shakira	
May 11	"De Repente"	Soraya	
May 18	"De Repente"	Soraya	
May 25	"¡Basta Ya!"	Olga Tañón	
June 1	"Amarte a Ti"	Cristian Castro	
June 8	"Amarte a Ti"	Cristian Castro	
June 15	"Por Amarte" †	Enrique Iglesias	
June 22	"La Cosa Más Bella"	Eros Ramazzotti	
June 29	"La Cosa Más Bella"	Eros Ramazzotti	
July 6	"La Cosa Más Bella"	Eros Ramazzotti	
July 13	"La Cosa Más Bella"	Eros Ramazzotti	
July 20	"Sueña"	Luis Miguel	
July 27	"Sueña"	Luis Miguel	
August 3	"Sueña"	Luis Miguel	
August 10	"Amor en Tus Ojos"	Soraya	
August 17	"Amor en Tus Ojos"	Soraya	
August 24	"Amor en Tus Ojos"	Soraya	
August 31	"Amor en Tus Ojos"	Soraya	
September 7	"Dame"	Luis Miguel	
September 14	"Dame"	Luis Miguel	
September 21	"Dame"	Luis Miguel	
September 28	"Dame"	Luis Miguel	
October 5	"Dame"	Luis Miguel	
October 12	"Solamente Tu Amor"	Chayanne	
October 19	"Atada a Tu Volcán"	Ednita Nazario	
October 26	"Atada a Tu Volcán"	Ednita Nazario	
November 2	"Ámame una Vez Más"	Amanda Miguel	
November 9	"Ámame una Vez Más"	Amanda Miguel	
November 16	"Ámame una Vez Más"	Amanda Miguel	
November 23	"Ámame una Vez Más"	Amanda Miguel	
November 30	"Ámame una Vez Más"	Amanda Miguel	
December 7	"Ámame una Vez Más"	Amanda Miguel	
December 14	"Ámame una Vez Más"	Amanda Miguel	
December 21	"Ámame una Vez Más"	Amanda Miguel	
December 28	"Las Cosas Que Vives"	Laura Pausini	

== See also ==
- 1996 in Latin music
