= Herencia (album) =

Greatest hits album by Soraya
- Released: 27 June 2006
- Recorded: 1995–2000
- Genre: Pop, latin pop, worldbeat
- Label: Universal Music
- Producer: Soraya, Carole King, Tony Nicholas, Peter Van Hooke, Rod Argent

Soraya Compilations chronology
Éxitos Eternos (2005)	Herencia (2006)	Entre Su Ritmo y El Silencio (2006)

Professional ratings
Review scores
Source	Rating
Allmusic	4.5/5 stars

Herencia (English: Heritage) is a posthumous compilation album by Colombian-American singer-songwriter Soraya. It was released in 2006 by Universal Music.

== Track listing ==
1. "De Repente"
2. "Quédate"
3. "En Esta Noche"
4. "Amor En Tus Ojos"
5. "Avalancha"
6. "Pueblito Viejo"
7. "Lejos de Aquí"
8. "París, Calí, Milán"
9. "Torre De Marfil"
10. "Cuerpo Y Alma"
11. "¿En Dónde Estás?"
12. "Half"
13. "When Did I Say That?"
14. "You and I"
15. "Dance of the Waiting"
16. "Tu Y Yo" (Soul Solution Remix)
17. "¿En Dónde Estas?" (Hardball Tropical Mix)
