= Body and Soul =

Body and Soul may refer to:

== Entertainment ==
=== Songs ===
- "Body and Soul" (1930 song), a 1930 popular song and jazz standard, and the title song of many of the albums listed below
- "Body and Soul (That's the Way It's Got to Be)", a 1972 song by Soul Generation
- "Body and Soul", an Australian top 5 single in 1982 by Jo Kennedy
- "Body and Soul", a 1984 song by Mai Tai
- "Body and Soul" (Anita Baker song), 1994

=== Albums ===
- Body and Soul (Billie Holiday album), 1957
- The Body & the Soul, 1963 Freddie Hubbard album
- Body and Soul (Ray Nance album), 1969
- Body & Soul (Tete Montoliu album), recorded 1971 and released 1983
- Body and Soul (Al Cohn & Zoot Sims album), 1973
- The Body and Soul of Tom Jones, 1973
- Body and Soul (Archie Shepp album), 1975
- Body and Soul (The Thad Jones / Mel Lewis Orchestra album), 1978
- Body & Soul, an album by William Onyeabor, or the title song, 1980
- Body and Soul (Dexter Gordon album), 1981
- Body and Soul (Joe Jackson album), 1984
- Body and Soul (EP), EP by The Sisters of Mercy, or the title song, 1984
- Body and Soul (Jenny Morris album), or the title song, 1985
- Body & Soul, a 1989 album by Jon Gibson
- Body and Soul (Archie Shepp and Richard Davis album), 1991
- Body and Soul (Cabaret Voltaire album), 1991
- Body & Soul (Rick Astley album), or the title song, 1993
- Body and Soul (David Murray album), 1993
- Body and Soul (Coleman Hawkins album), 1994
- Body & Soul (Joeboy album), 2023

=== Films ===
- Body and Soul (1915 film), produced by the Frohman Amusement Corporation
- Body and Soul (1920 film), a silent film directed by Charles Swickard
- Body and Soul (1925 film), a silent race film by Oscar B. Micheaux
- Body and Soul (1927 film), a silent drama featuring Lionel Barrymore
- Body and Soul (1931 film), an aviation drama starring Charles Farrell and Humphrey Bogart
- Body and Soul (1947 film), a boxing-themed film noir starring John Garfield
- Body and Soul (1981 film), a remake of the 1947 film, starring Leon Isaac Kennedy and Jayne Kennedy
- Body and Soul (1997 film), a Japanese film by Haruhiko Arai
- Alien Nation: Body and Soul, a 1995 television film
- Body and Soul (1999 film), another remake of the 1947 film, starring Ray Mancini

=== Television ===
- Body & Soul (TV miniseries), a 1993 UK drama serial starring Kristin Scott Thomas
- "Body and Soul" (Star Trek: Voyager), a 2000 episode of Star Trek: Voyager
- Body & Soul (TV series), a 2002 American series starring Peter Strauss
- Body & Soul: Diana & Kathy, a film by Alice Elliott awarded Best in Festival at the 2008 Superfest International Disability Film Festival
- "Body & Soul" (House), a 2012 episode of House

=== Books ===
- Body and Soul, a 1993 novel by Frank Conroy
- Body+Soul, now known as Whole Living, a health and lifestyle magazine

== Other ==
- Body & Soul, an American female hip-hop duo featuring Dee Barnes
- Soul and Body, two anonymous Old English poems

== See also ==
- Bodies and Souls, a 1983 album by The Manhattan Transfer
- In Body and Soul, a 1951 Argentine film
- On Body and Soul, a 2017 Hungarian film
- With Body & Soul, a 1967 album by Julie London
- Body, Mind, Soul, a 1993 album by Debbie Gibson
- Mind Body & Soul, a 2004 album by Joss Stone
- "Mind, Body and Soul", a 1969 song by the Flaming Ember
- Cuerpo y Alma, a 2000 album by Soraya
  - "Cuerpo y Alma" (song), 2000 song by Soraya
- Mit Leib und Seele (disambiguation)
