= Ámame una Vez Más =

1996 single by Amanda Miguel

Single by Amanda Miguel

from the album Ámame una Vez Más
- Released: 1996
- Studio: Santanna Recording Studios, Bolgna, Italy
- Genre: Latin pop
- Length: 4:26
- Label: Karen
- Songwriters: Anahí, Diego Verdaguer
- Producer: Diego Verdaguer

Amanda Miguel singles chronology
"Volvamos a Empezar" (1989)	"Ámame una Vez Más" (1996)	"Media Hora" (1996)

"Ámame una Vez Más" (Love Me One More Time) (also subtitled as "La Última Luna") (The Last Moon) is a song performed by Amanda Miguel on her 1996 studio album of the same name. It was co-written by Anahí (not to be confused with the RBD member of the same name) and produced by her husband Diego Verdaguer. The album remarked the return of Amanda Miguel following more than a five-year hiatus. "Ámame una Vez Más" won the Billboard Latin Music Award for Latin Pop Song of the Year in 1997 and was recognized as one of the award-winning songs at the ASCAP Latin Awards in the same year. It was also nominated for Pop Song of the Year at the 8th Annual Lo Nuestro Awards in 1997.

== Charts ==
=== Weekly charts ===
Chart (1996)	Peak position
US Hot Latin Songs (Billboard)	3
US Latin Pop Airplay (Billboard)	1

=== Year-end charts ===
Chart (1996)	Position
US Hot Latin Songs (Billboard)	26
US Latin Pop Songs (Billboard)	3

== See also ==
- List of Billboard Latin Pop Airplay number ones of 1996
