= Long Beach Pride =

LGBT pride event in California, United States

Long Beach Pride, formerly Long Beach Lesbian & Gay Pride, is an annual LGBTQ+ pride festival and parade in Long Beach, California. It is typically held on the next to last weekend in May. Long Beach Pride held its first event in June 1984 and has since grown to be the third largest pride event in Southern California.

Long Beach Pride is produced by the non-profit organization Long Beach Pride Inc. Beginning in 2024, the parade has been organized by the city of Long Beach, while Long Beach Pride Inc. organizes the festival.

== History ==
In October 1983, Marylin Barlow, Bob Crow, and Judith Doyle founded Long Beach Lesbian & Gay Pride, Inc. (LBLGP, Inc.), and they put on the first Long Beach Lesbian & Gay Pride event the following year in June 1984. The event drew 5,000 people across two days.

The event met with notable resistance the following year for their 1985 festival, in which the city of Long Beach attempted to limit their two-day permit to one day.

By 1993, Long Beach Lesbian & Gay Pride had become the fourth largest pride event in the United States.

In 2020, the event formally rebranded as Long Beach Pride to be more inclusive of the LGBTQ+ community.

There was no parade in 2020 or 2021 due to the COVID-19 pandemic, but a virtual festival took place both years.

Beginning in 2024, organization of the parade was transferred to the city of Long Beach.

On May 15, 2026, the festival was abruptly cancelled by Long Beach officials; the city stated that Long Beach Pride had failed to submit completed site, security, and electrical plans for their chosen venues in order to receive their permit for the event, noting that they had been attempting to submit them at the last minute rather than around 65 days in advance as normally required. The parade on May 17, 2026 went on as scheduled, and the city organized a smaller replacement event at Bixby Park entitled "Canceled? Never Heard of Her!" following the parade; the city had offered to work with Long Beach Pride organizers on replacement events and alternate venues, but the organization declined.

== About LBLGP Inc. ==
Long Beach Lesbian & Gay Pride, Inc. (LBLGP, Inc.) was established in October 1983 and produced the first annual Long Beach Lesbian & Gay Pride Festival & Parade in June 1984. The Board of Directors felt that, with such a large gay and lesbian population, there was a need to increase awareness and to promote PRIDE and a greater sense of self-worth within the community. Additionally, the Board felt it important to facilitate greater cooperation, mutual respect and understanding between the Lesbian & Gay Community and the community of Long Beach.

At first, money to meet the city's stringent fees was in short supply. Yet, after producing only two parades and festivals, LBLGP, Inc. began making outright grants to other nonprofit organizations. Shortly after that, LBLGP, Inc. began donating funds to their volunteer's favorite charities. The amount of this contribution is based on the number of hours volunteers work at the parade and festival. Today, LBLGP, Inc. continues the tradition of giving back a portion of the proceeds, which has become the hallmark of the organization. For over more than a decade now, LBLGP, Inc. has grown to become the large philanthropic organization that it is today--- having granted over a half-million dollars in the past five years and nearly One Million since its inception.

While the main project of Long Beach Lesbian & Gay Pride, Inc. is the annual Pride Parade & Festival, the organization operates year-round and sponsors other philanthropic projects. Since the beginning, LBLGP, Inc. has spearheaded a toy drive for disabled and disadvantaged children. In 1994 alone, the toy drive collected over 1500 toys distributed in cooperation with Catholic Charities.

The Long Beach Lesbian & Gay Pride Festival & Parade was once the 3rd largest in the nation, and it has attracted as many as 80,000 participants over its multi-day celebration. More than 200 marching groups and floats comprise the parade entries since 1995, representing various religious, human services, governmental and social organizations.

== Notable performers ==
- India Arie
- Iggy Azalea
- The Bangles
- Ana Bárbara
- Sara Bareilles
- Belanova
- Pat Benatar
- Divine Brown
- Havana Brown
- Christian Chávez
- The Cover Girls
- Elvis Crespo
- DaniLeigh
- Taylor Dayne
- Kristina DeBarge
- Kat DeLuna
- Dev
- Aarón Díaz
- Sheila E.
- Sheena Easton
- Fantasia
- Fey
- A Flock of Seagulls
- Big Freedia
- Ari Gold
- Macy Gray
- Sophie B. Hawkins
- Ty Herndon
- Jennifer Holliday
- Los Horóscopos de Durango
- Thelma Houston
- Jennifer Hudson
- Indigo Girls
- Allison Iraheta
- Joan Jett
- Natalia Jiménez
- María José
- KC and the Sunshine Band
- Chaka Khan
- Amara La Negra
- Queen Latifah
- Patti LaBelle
- Kimberly Locke
- Alec Mapa
- Edith Marquez
- Lucía Méndez
- Amanda Miguel
- Eddie Money
- Monica
- Morris Day and The Time
- Mýa
- Maxine Nightingale
- Neon Trees
- CeCe Peniston
- Amanda Perez
- Ivy Queen
- Little Richard
- Savannah Robinson
- Jai Rodriguez
- Kelly Rowland
- Paulina Rubio
- RuPaul
- Salt-N-Pepa
- Mariana Seoane
- Smash Mouth
- Jussie Smollett
- Jazmine Sullivan
- Symone
- Olga Tañón
- Gloria Trevi
- Ana Victoria
- The Village People
- Shangela Laquifa Wadley
- Jody Watley
- Pamela Williams
- Kim Yarbrough
- Amber
- Azealia Banks
- Black Box
- Deborah Cox
- Evelyn 'Champagne' King
- La India
- Shannon
- Jeanie Tracy
