= Entre Su Ritmo y El Silencio =

Greatest hits album by Soraya
- Released: 17 July 2006
- Recorded: 2001–2005
- Genre: Pop, latin pop, latin rock
- Label: EMI, Capitol
- Producer: Soraya

Soraya Compilations chronology
Herencia (2006)	Entre Su Ritmo y El Silencio (2006)

Entre Su Ritmo y el Silencio (English: Between its Rhythm and the Silence) is the second posthumous compilation album by Colombian-American singer-songwriter Soraya. It was released in 2006 by EMI Music.

== Track listing ==
1. Como Sería
2. El Otro Lado de Mi
3. Miento
4. Casi
5. Alma de La Calle
6. Sólo por Ti
7. Prisonera
8. Ser
9. Llévame
10. Tiempo
11. Ser Amado
12. A Tu Lado
13. Lead Me
14. Dreaming of You
