= Billboard Latin Music Award for Latin Pop Song of the Year =

American music award

- Current: 2024 Billboard Latin Music Awards
- Awarded for: the best performing Latin pop songs in Billboard magazine
- Country: United States
- Presented by: Billboard
- First award: 1994
- Final award: 2024
- Currently held by: "No Es Normal" by Venesti, Nacho and Maffio (2024)

Highlights
- Most awards: Cristian Castro and Enrique Iglesias (3)
- Most nominations: Shakira (11)
- Website: billboardevents.com

The Billboard Latin Music Award for Latin Pop Song of the Year (formerly Latin Pop Airplay Track of the Year and Pop Song of the Year) is an honor presented annually at the Billboard Latin Music Awards, a ceremony which honors "the most popular albums, songs, and performers in Latin music, as determined by the actual sales, radio airplay, online streaming and social data that informs Billboard's weekly charts." The award is given to the best-performing singles on Billboard's Latin Pop Airplay chart, which measures the most popular pop music recordings on Spanish-language radio stations in the United States. The list was established by the magazine on October 8, 1994. From 2003 to 2009, the award was separated into Male, Female, Duo or Group, and New Artist categories.

Cristian Castro and Enrique Iglesias are the most awarded acts in the category with three wins each. Shakira is the most nominated artist with 11 nominations. Only Ricky Martin has won Latin Pop Song of the Year twice in a row. As of 2023, the holders are Bizarrap and Shakira for the song "Bzrp Music Sessions, Vol. 53".

== Recipients ==
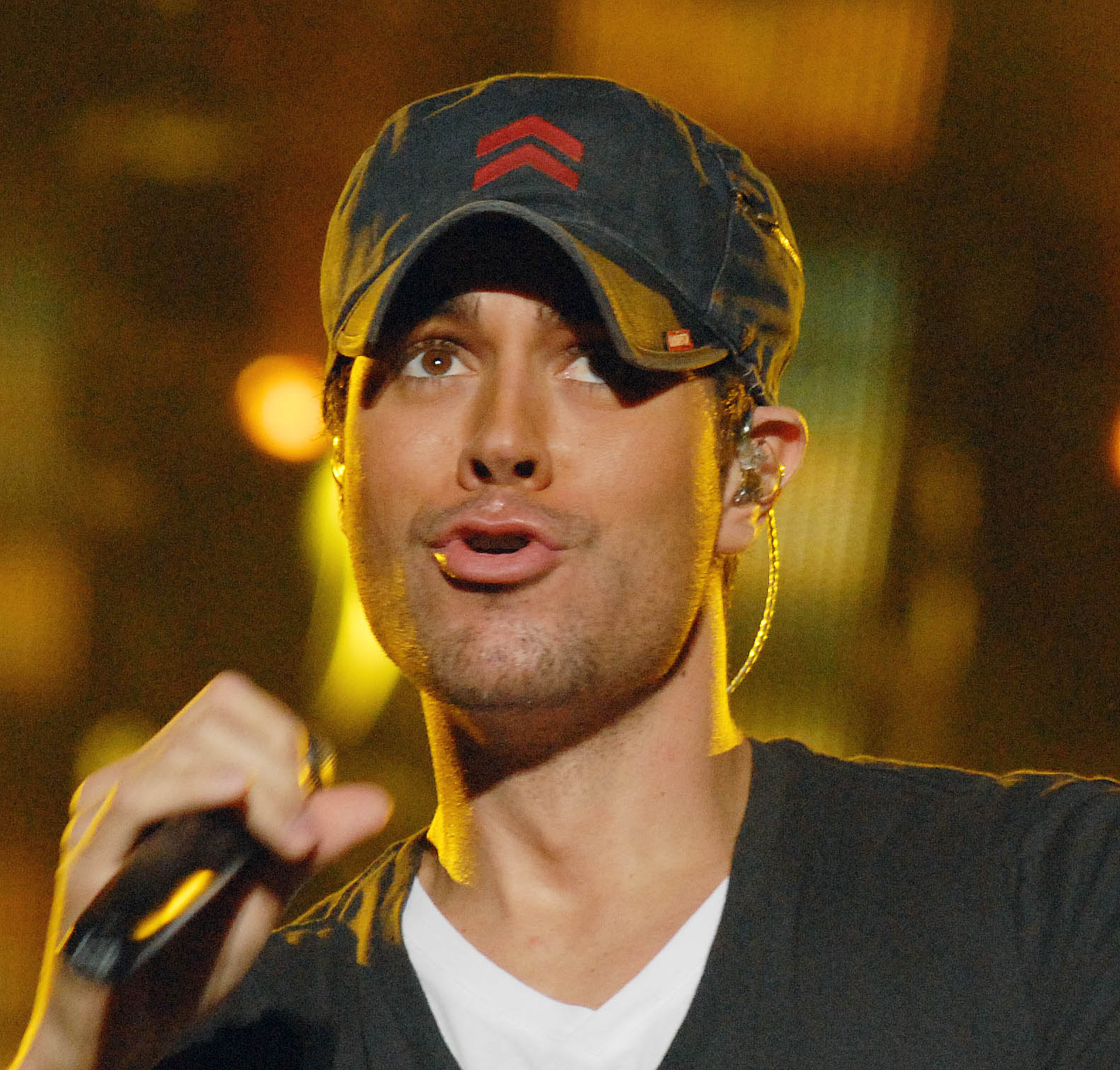

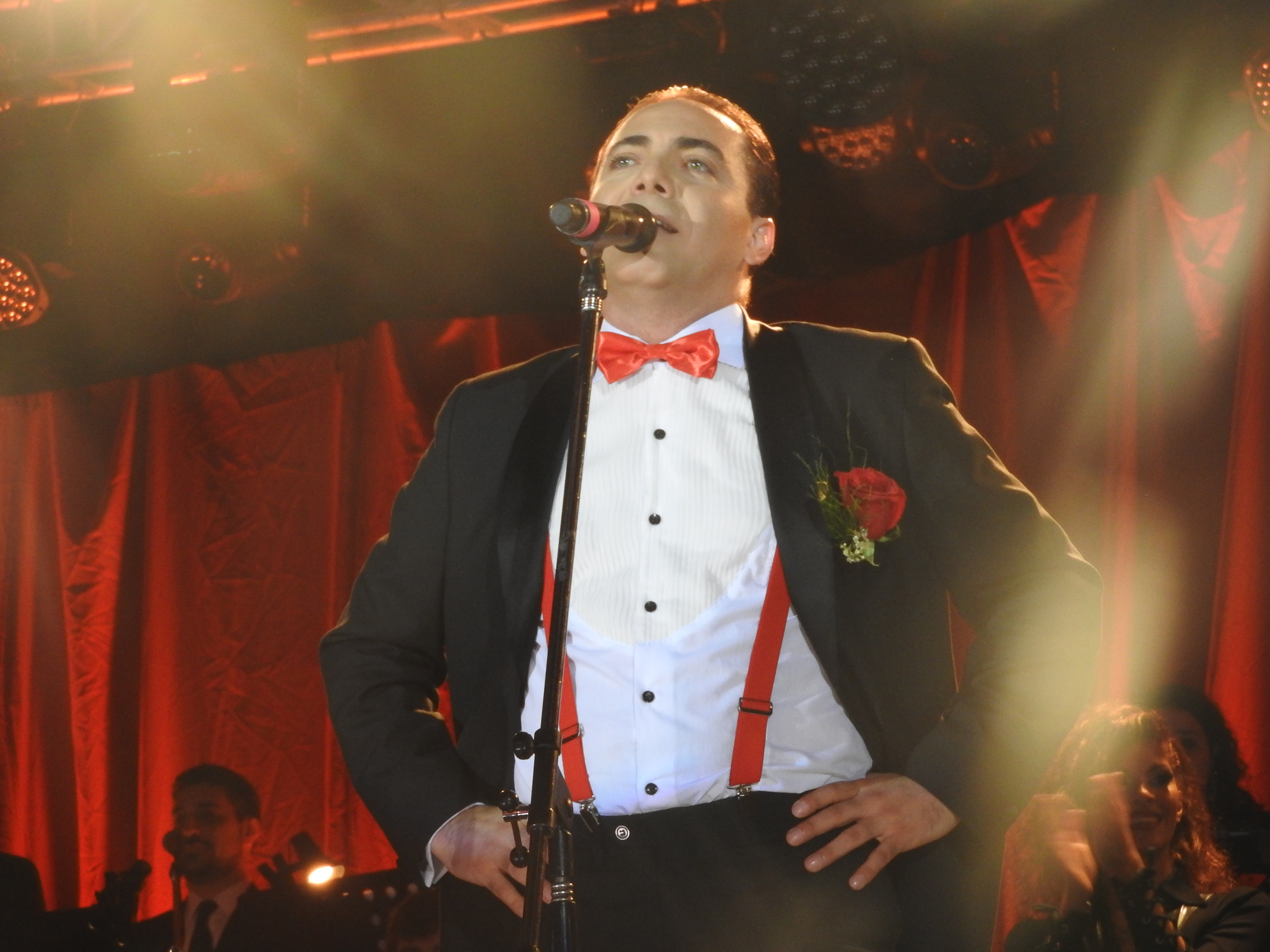
Three-time winners Enrique Iglesias (top) and Cristian Castro (bottom)

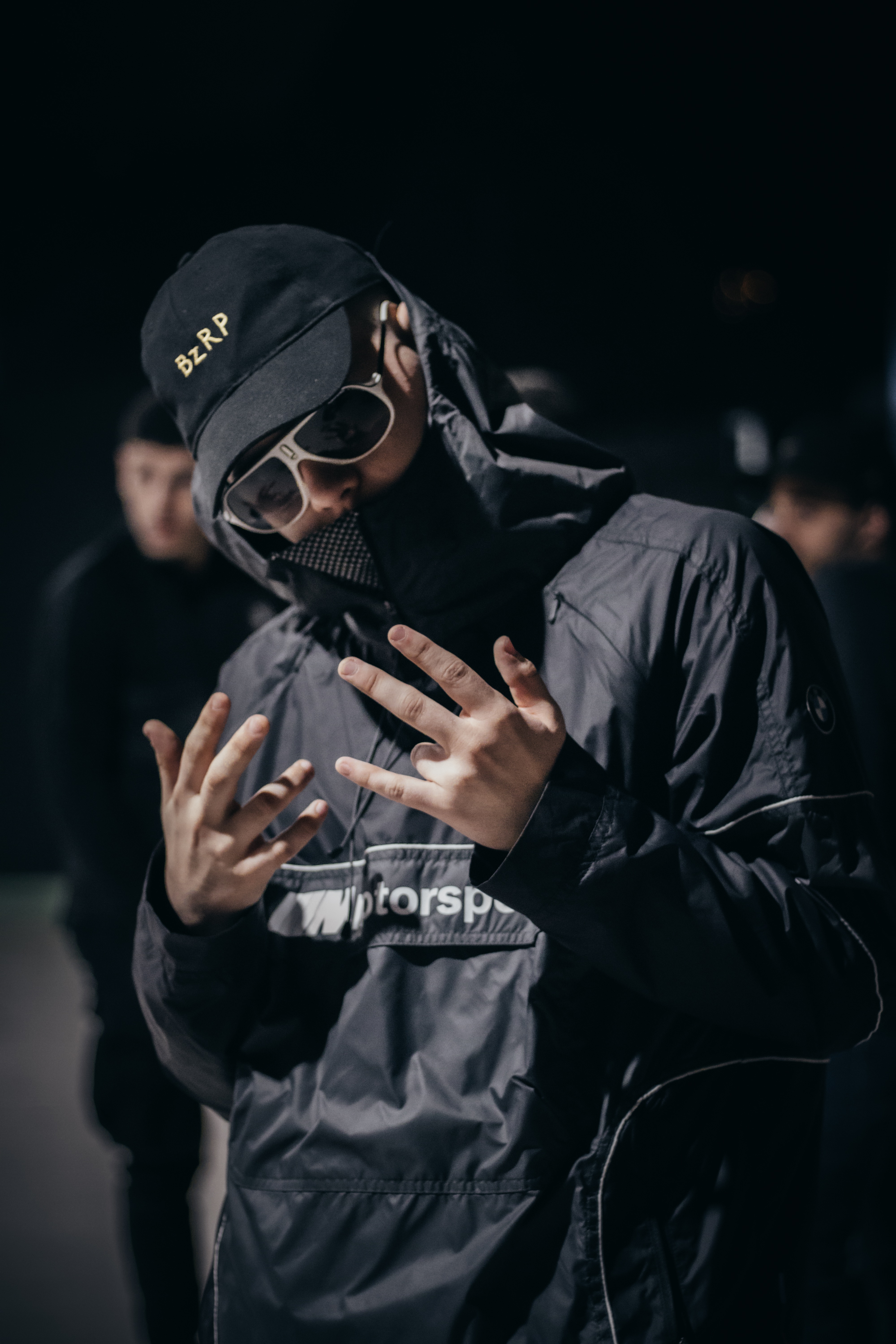

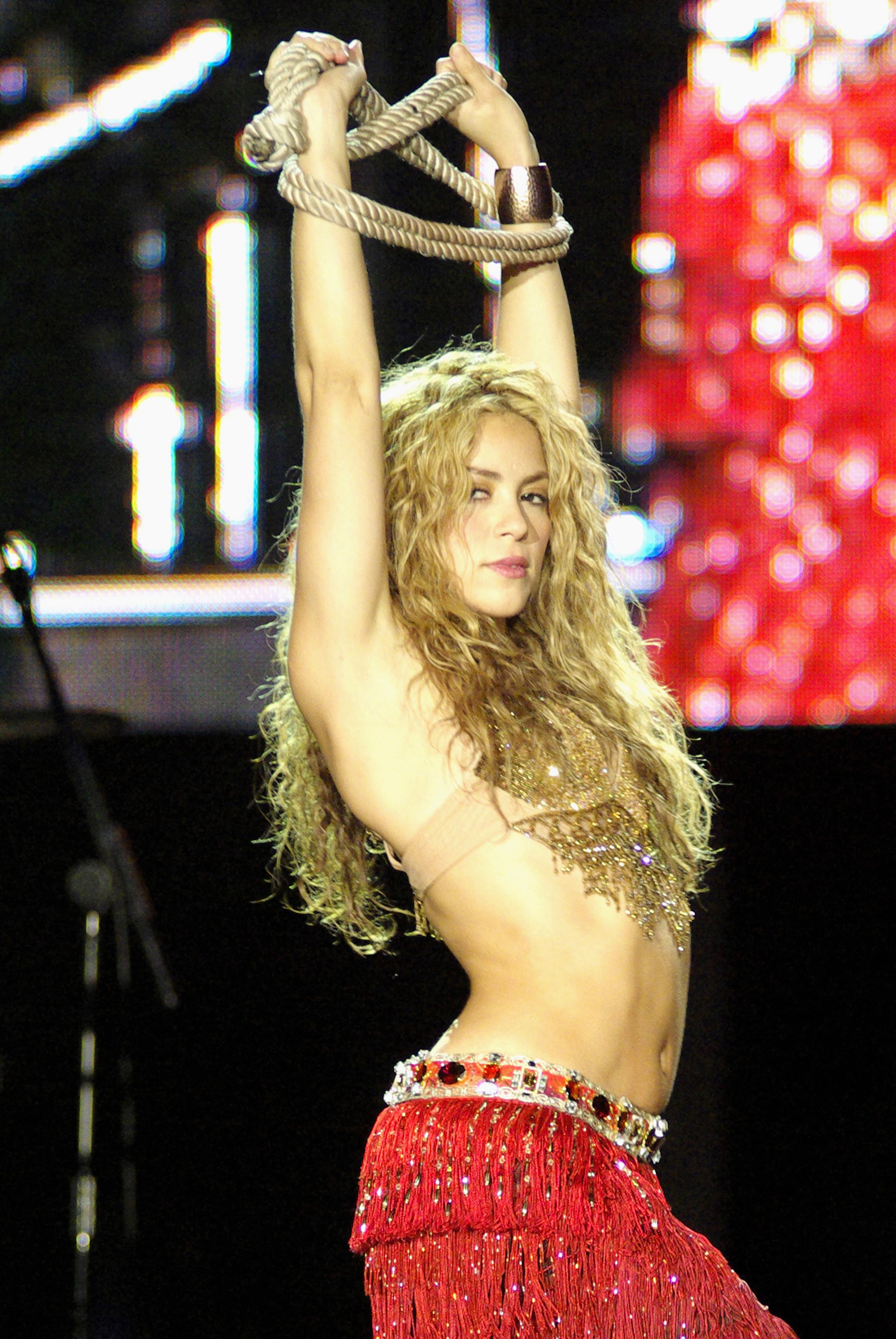
Current holders Bizarrap (top) and Shakira (bottom)

Year	Performing artist(s)	Work	Nominees	Ref.
1994	Cristian Castro	"Nunca Voy a Olvidarte"	Nominations were not provided prior to 1999.	
1995	La Mafia	"Vida"	Nominations were not provided prior to 1999.	
1996	Cristian Castro	"Vuélveme a Querer"	Nominations were not provided prior to 1999.	
1997	Amanda Miguel	"Amame Una Vez Más"	Nominations were not provided prior to 1999.	
1998	Cristian Castro	"Lo Mejor de Mí"	Nominations were not provided prior to 1999.	
1999	Ricky Martin	"Vuelve"	Alejandro Fernández – "Yo Nací Para Amarte"; Alejandro Fernández – "No Sé Olvidar"; Cristian Castro – "Lo Mejor de Mí"	
2000	Ricky Martin	"Livin' La Vida Loca"	Alejandro Fernández – "Loco"; Enrique Iglesias – "Bailamos"; Ricky Martin – "Bella"	
2001	Son by Four	"A Puro Dolor"	Chayanne – "Atado a Tu Amor"; Cristian Castro – "Por Amarte Así"; Marc Anthony – "Muy Dentro de Mí"	
2002	Juan Gabriel	"Abrázame Muy Fuerte"	Cristian Castro – "Azul"; Jaci Velasquez – "Cómo Se Cura Una Herida"; Shakira – "Suerte"	
2003	During this period, the Latin Pop Airplay Track of the Year award was divided into Male, Female, Duo or Group, and New Artist categories			
2004	During this period, the Latin Pop Airplay Track of the Year award was divided into Male, Female, Duo or Group, and New Artist categories			
2005	During this period, the Latin Pop Airplay Track of the Year award was divided into Male, Female, Duo or Group, and New Artist categories			
2006	During this period, the Latin Pop Airplay Track of the Year award was divided into Male, Female, Duo or Group, and New Artist categories			
2007	During this period, the Latin Pop Airplay Track of the Year award was divided into Male, Female, Duo or Group, and New Artist categories			
2008	During this period, the Latin Pop Airplay Track of the Year award was divided into Male, Female, Duo or Group, and New Artist categories			
2009	During this period, the Latin Pop Airplay Track of the Year award was divided into Male, Female, Duo or Group, and New Artist categories			
2010	Luis Fonsi featuring Aleks Syntek, David Bisbal, and Noel Schajris	"Aquí Estoy Yo"	Paulina Rubio – "Causa y Efecto"; Shakira – "Loba"; Tito El Bambino – "El Amor"	
2011	Enrique Iglesias featuring Juan Luis Guerra	"Cuando Me Enamoro"	Camila – "Aléjate de Mí"; Camila – "Mientes"; Chino & Nacho – "Mi Niña Bonita"	
2012	Don Omar	"Taboo"	Jennifer Lopez featuring Pitbull – "Ven A Bailar"; Maná – "Lluvia al Corazón"; Pitbull featuring Ne-Yo, Afrojack, and Nayer – "Give Me Everything"	
2013	Michel Telo	"Ai Se Eu Te Pego"	Jesse & Joy – "¡Corre!"; Shakira – "Addicted to You (Shakira song)"; Wisin & Yandel featuring Chris Brown and T-Pain – "Algo Me Gusta de Ti"	
2014	Marc Anthony	"Vivir Mi Vida"	Daddy Yankee – "Limbo"; Enrique Iglesias featuring Romeo Santos – "Loco"; Prince Royce – "Darte Un Beso"	
2015	Enrique Iglesias featuring Descemer Bueno and Gente de Zona	"Bailando"	Camila – "Decidiste Dejarme"; Chayanne "Humanos A Marte"; Enrique Iglesias featuring Marco Antonio Solís – "El Perdedor"	
2016	Maná featuring Shakira	"Mi Verdad"	Christian Daniel – "Ahora Que Te Vas"; Juanes – "Juntos"; Ricky Martin featuring Yotuel – "La Mordidita"	
2017	Enrique Iglesias featuring Wisin	"Duele El Corazón"	Carlos Vives and Shakira – "La Bicicleta"; Chino & Nacho featuring Daddy Yankee – "Andas En Mi Cabeza"; Reik and Nicky Jam – "Ya Me Enteré"	
2018	Luis Fonsi and Daddy Yankee featuring Justin Bieber	"Despacito"	Enrique Iglesias featuring Descemer Bueno and Zion & Lennox – "Súbeme La Radio"; Shakira featuring Maluma – "Chantaje"; Shakira – "Me Enamoré"	
2019	Reik featuring Ozuna and Wisin	"Me Niego"	Enrique Iglesias featuring Bad Bunny – "El Baño"; Luis Fonsi and Demi Lovato – "Échame La Culpa"; Shakira and Maluma – "Clandestino"	
2020	Pedro Capó and Farruko	"Calma (Remix)"	Luis Fonsi, Sebastián Yatra and Nicky Jam – "Date La Vuelta"; Rosalía & Ozuna – "Yo x ti, tú x mí"; Rosalía & J Balvin featuring El Guincho - "Con altura"	
2021	Black Eyed Peas, Ozuna & J. Rey Soul	"Mamacita"	Kali Uchis – "Telepatía"; Reik, Farruko & Camilo – "Si Me Dices Que Sí"; Sebastián Yatra, Rauw Alejandro & Manuel Turizo - "TBT"; Shakira & Anuel AA - "Me Gusta"	
2022	Rauw Alejandro	"Todo de Ti"	Becky G & Karol G – "Mamiii"; Karol G – "Provenza"; Sebastián Yatra - "Tacones Rojos"; Shakira & Rauw Alejandro - "Te Felicito"	
2023	Bizarrap & Shakira	"Shakira: Bzrp Music Sessions, Vol. 53"	Karol G & Shakira – "TQG"; Maluma – "Junio"; Rosalía & Rauw Alejandro - "Beso"; Sebastián Yatra - "Una Noche Sin Pensar"	

== Records ==
=== Most nominations ===
Nominations	Act
11	Shakira
8	Enrique Iglesias
6	Cristian Castro
4	Ricky Martin
4	Luis Fonsi
4	Sebastián Yatra
4	Rauw Alejandro
3	Alejandro Fernández
3	Camila
3	Wisin
3	Daddy Yankee
3	Reik
3	Ozuna
3	Maluma
3	Rosalía
3	Farruko
2	Chayanne
2	Chino & Nacho
2	Descemer Bueno
2	Maná
2	Marc Anthony
2	Pitbull
2	Nicky Jam
2	Karol G

=== Most awards ===
Awards	Act
3	Cristian Castro
3	Enrique Iglesias
2	Luis Fonsi
2	Ricky Martin
2	Wisin
2	Shakira
2	Ozuna

== See also ==
- Latin Grammy Award for Best Pop Song
- Lo Nuestro Award for Pop Song of the Year
