= Llévame =

Single by Soraya

from the album El Otro Lado de Mi
- Released: 2005
- Recorded: 2004
- Genre: Latin pop, latin rock
- Length: 3:38
- Label: Capitol Latin
- Songwriter(s): Soraya
- Producer(s): Soraya

Soraya singles chronology
"Sólo por Ti" (2003)	"Llévame" (2005)	"Como Sería" (2006)

"Llévame" (English: "Lead Me") is a song by Colombian-American latin pop singer-songwriter Soraya. The song was released as the lead single from her fifth and final studio album El Otro Lado de Mi. The song was written, recorded and produced by Soraya.

== Track listing ==
Digital download
No.	Title	Length
1.	"Llévame (Radio Edit)"	3:18
2.	"Llévame (Bonus)"	3:23
3.	"Lead Me (English Version)"	3:36

== Chart performance ==
Chart (2005)	Peak position
US Hot Latin Songs (Billboard)	15
US Latin Pop Airplay (Billboard)	10
