= ¿Qué Hago Yo? =

Single by Ha*Ash

from the album Mundos Opuestos
- Language: Spanish
- English title: "What do I do?"
- Released: 6 March 2006
- Recorded: 2004–2005
- Genre: Power ballad
- Length: 3:26
- Label: Sony Music Latin
- Songwriter: Soraya
- Producer: Áureo Baqueiro

Ha*Ash singles chronology
"Me Entrego a Ti" (2005)	"¿Qué Hago Yo?" (2006)	"Tu Mirada en Mi" (2006)

Music video
- "¿Qué Hago Yo?" on YouTube

"¿Qué Hago Yo?" (transl. "What do I do?") is a Latin pop song recorded by American duo Ha*Ash. It was first included on Ha*Ash's second studio album Mundos Opuestos (2005) where it was released as the third single on March 6, 2006 and then included on their live albums Primera Fila: Hecho Realidad (2014) and Ha*Ash: En Vivo (2019). Colombian-American singer Soraya wrote the track.

== Background and release ==
"¿Qué Hago Yo?" was written by Soraya and produced by Áureo Baqueiro. Is a song recorded by American duo Ha*Ash from her second studio album "Mundos Opuestos" (2005) and then recorded live for his live album Primera Fila: Hecho Realidad in 2014. It was released as the third single from the album on March 6, 2006 by Sony Music Entertainment.

== Commercial performance ==
The track peaked at number 50 in the Latin Pop Songs charts in the United States. In Mexico, the song peaked at number 1 in the Monitor Latino, and 36 in the Mexican Singles Chart. On February 12, 2007, it was announced that ¿Qué Hago Yo? had been certified Platinum (rigtone).

== Music video ==
A music video for "¿Qué Hago Yo?" was released in March, 2006. Was published on her YouTube channel on April 24, 2010. It was directed by Leo Sánchez. As of October 2019, the video has over 189 million views on YouTube.

The second music video for "¿Qué Hago Yo?", recorded live for the live album Primera Fila: Hecho Realidad, was released on April 29, 2015. It was directed by Nahuel Lerena. The video was filmed in Estudios Churubusco, City Mexico. As of October 2019, the video has over 72 million views on YouTube.

The third video for "Me Entrego a Ti", recorded live for the live album Ha*Ash: En Vivo, was released on December 6, 2019. The video was filmed in Auditorio Nacional, Mexico City.

== Credits and personnel ==
Credits adapted from AllMusic and Genius.

Recording and management

- Recording Country: United States
- Sony / ATV Discos Music Publishing LLC / Westwood Publishing
- (P) 2005 Sony Music Entertainment México, S.A. De C.V.

Ha*Ash

- Ashley Grace – vocals, guitar
- Hanna Nicole – vocals, guitar

Additional personnel

- Áureo Baqueiro – recording engineer, arranger, director
- Soraya – songwriting.
- Gerardo García – guitar, acoustic guitar, mandoline.
- Tommy Morgan – harmonica.
- Gabe Witcher – violin.

== Charts ==
Chart	Position
Mexico (Monitor Latino)	4
Mexico (Billboard Espanol Airplay)	36
US Latin Pop Songs (Billboard)	15

== Certifications ==
Region	Certification	Certified units/sales
Mexico (AMPROFON)	Platinum	60,000^{*}
^{*} Sales figures based on certification alone.

== Release history ==
Region	Date	Edition(s)	Format	Label	Ref.
Various	March 6, 2006	Standard	CD Single	Sony Music Latin	
Various	November 11, 2014	Live Version	Digital download; streaming	Sony Music Latin	
Various	December 6, 2019	Live Version	Digital download; streaming	Sony Music Latin	
