= Mundos Opuestos (album) =

2005 studio album by Ha*Ash

Studio album by Ha*Ash
- Released: September 27, 2005
- Recorded: 2004–2005
- Genres: Latin; pop
- Length: 44:57
- Language: Spanish
- Label: Sony BMG
- Producer: Áureo Baqueiro

Ha*Ash chronology
Ha*Ash (2003)	Mundos Opuestos (2005)	Habitación Doble (2008)

Special Edition cover

Singles from Mundos Opuestos
- 1. "Amor a Medias" Released: June 8, 2005; 2. "Me Entrego a Ti" Released: November 27, 2005; 3. "¿Qué Hago Yo?" Released: March 6, 2006; 4. "Tu Mirada en Mi (USA)" Released: April 22, 2006

Mundos Opuestos (English: "Opposite worlds") is the second studio album by American Latin pop duo Ha*Ash. It was published under the Sony BMG label on September 27, 2005. The album was produced by Áureo Baqueiro. Four singles were released from the album.

Four singles were released from Mundos Opuestos. "Amor a Medias" was released as the lead single in June 2005. The following singles, "Me Entrego a Ti", "¿Qué Hago Yo?" an are composition of the Colombian-American singer Soraya and "Tu Mirada en Mi" is a composition of the Peruvian singer-songwriter Gianmarco. The album features a cover of the song from 1935 "I Want to Be a Cowboy's Sweetheart".

== Background and production ==
Their second album, Mundos Opuestos was also produced by Áureo Baqueiro. The album features a cover of the song from 1935 I Want to Be a Cowboy's Sweetheart.

== Release and promotion ==
It was published under the Sony BMG label on September 27, 2005. A special edition of the album was released including one new tracks "Código Postal". The song was used as the main theme of the Televisa telenovela Código Postal.

=== Singles ===
- "Amor a Medias" (Half Love) was released as the album's lead single on July 8, 2005. It peaked at #4 on Monitor Latino in México.
- "Me Entrego a Ti" (I surrender to you) is chosen as the album second single released on November 24, 2005. It peaked at #15 on Billboard Latin Pop chart.
- "¿Qué Hago Yo?" (What do I do?) was released as the album's third single in February 2006. It peaked at #50 on Billboard Latin Pop chart and #1 on Monitor Latino in México. In 2007, it was certified platinum in the ringtone format.
- "Tu Mirada en Mi" (You look at me) was released as the album's fourth single in February 2006. It peaked at #50 on Billboard Latin Pop chart

== Commercial performance ==
The album peaked at #8 in the Mexican album charts. In 2005, the album was certified as gold in Mexico. On August 24, 2006, the album was certified as platinum in Mexico. The album eventually was certified platinum and gold in Mexico.

== Track listing ==
Mundos Opuestos — Standard edition
No.	Title	Writer(s)	Producer(s)	Length
1.	"Si Tú Quieres Ser"	Ashley Grace; Hanna Nicole; Áureo Baqueiro	Áureo Baqueiro	3:54
2.	"Amor a Medias"	Baqueiro; Salvador Rizo	Baqueiro	4:13
3.	"Tu Mirada en Mi"	Ashley; Hanna; Baqueiro; Gian Marco; Rizo	Baqueiro	3:44
4.	"Ya No" (feat.Kalimba)	Baqueiro	Baqueiro	3:40
5.	"Me Entrego a Ti"	Soraya	Baqueiro	3:45
6.	"No Te Puedo Enamorar"	Ashley; Hanna; Baqueiro; Carla García	Baqueiro	4:15
7.	"Aléjate de Mi Hermana"	Baqueiro; Rizo	Baqueiro	4:03
8.	"Quédate Conmigo"	Baqueiro; Fernando Gonzalez	Baqueiro	4:20
9.	"Más Perfecta Que Normal"	Ashley; Hanna	Baqueiro	3:01
10.	"Vaquera" (I Want to Be a Cowboy's Sweet Heart)	Patsy Montana	Baqueiro	2:42
11.	"Pobre Diabla"	Amerika Jiménez; Jean-Yves G Ducornet; Alejandra Menkarski	Baqueiro	3:58
12.	"¿Qué Hago Yo?"	Soraya	Baqueiro	3:26
Total length:				44:47

Mundos Opuestos — Deluxe edition
No.	Title	Writer(s)	Producer(s)	Length
13.	"Código Postal"	Carlos de Yarza; Carlos Ponce	Baqueiro	3:05

== Credits and personnel ==
Credits adapted from the album's liner notes.

=== Musicians ===
- Ashley Grace – vocals (all tracks)
- Hanna Nicole – vocals (all tracks)
- Áureo Baqueiro: drums (1, 4), bass (1), chorus (all tracks)
- Pepe Damián: drums (1, 4)
- Javier Calderón: bass (3, 5–9, 11–12), electric guitar (1, 3, 5–9, 11–12), acoustic guitar (1, 3, 5–9, 11–12), mandolin (1, 3, 5–9, 11–12)
- Gerardo García: electric guitar (2, 10), acoustic guitar (2, 10), mandolin (2, 10)
- Pancho Ruiz: bass (2)
- Mr B: bass (4), electric guitar (4), acoustic guitar (4), mandolin (4)
- Dean Parks: pedal steel (all tracks), lap steel (all tracks)
- Gabe Witcher: violin (all tracks)
- Tommy Morgan: harmonica (all tracks)
- Carlos Murguía: hammond organ (all tracks)
- Michelle Batrez: chorus (all tracks)

=== Production ===
- Áureo Baqueiro: producer (all tracks), arrangements (1–2, 4, 6–7, 10)
- Javier Calderón: arrangements (3, 5–9, 11–12)
- Gerardo García: arrangements (2, 10)
- Memo Gil: mixing (2, 5, 9, 10–12)
- Gustavo Borner: mixing (1, 3–4, 6–8)
- Don Tyler: mastering (all tracks)

== Charts ==
=== Weekly charts ===
Weekly chart performance for Mundos Opuestos
Chart (2005)	Peak position
México (AMPROFON)	8

=== Year-end charts ===
2006year-end chart performance for Mundos Opuestos
Chart (2006)	Position
Mexican Albums (AMPROFON)	40

== Certifications ==
Region	Certification	Certified units/sales
Mexico (AMPROFON)	Platinum+Gold	150,000^{^}
^{^} Shipments figures based on certification alone.

== Release history ==
Region	Date	Edition(s)	Format	Label
Mexico	September 27, 2005	Standard	CD; Digital download	Sony Music Mexico
United States	September 27, 2005	Standard	CD; Digital download	Sony Music Latin
Mexico	June 16, 2006	Deluxe Edition	CD; Digital download	Sony Music Mexico
