= Me Entrego a Ti =

Single by Ha*Ash

from the album Mundos Opuestos
- Language: Spanish
- English title: "What do I do?"
- Released: 27 November 2005
- Recorded: 2004–2005
- Genre: Latin pop; pop
- Length: 3:45
- Label: Sony Music Latin
- Songwriter: Soraya
- Producer: Áureo Baqueiro

Ha*Ash singles chronology
"Amor a Medias" (2005)	"Me Entrego a Ti" (2005)	"¿Qué Hago Yo?" (2006)

Music video
- "Me Entrego a Ti" on YouTube

"Me Entrego a Ti" (transl. "I Surrender To You") is a Latin pop song recorded by American duo Ha*Ash. It was first included on Ha*Ash's second studio album "Mundos Opuestos" (2005) where it was released as the second single on November 27, 2005 and then included on their live albums deluxe Primera Fila: Hecho Realidad (2016) and Ha*Ash: En Vivo (2019). Colombian-American singer Soraya wrote the track.

== Background and release ==
"Me Entrego a Ti" was written by Soraya and produced by Áureo Baqueiro. It is a song recorded by American duo Ha*Ash from her second studio album "Mundos Opuestos" (2005) and then recorded live for his live album deluxe Primera Fila: Hecho Realidad in 2016. It was released as the second single from the album on November 27, 2005, by Sony Music Entertainment.

== Commercial performance ==
The track peaked at number 15 in the Latin Pop Songs charts in the United States. In Mexico, the song peaked at number 4 in the Monitor Latino.

== Music video ==
A music video for "Me Entrego a Ti" was released in November, 2005. It was published on her YouTube channel on October 25, 2009. It was directed by David Ruiz. As of October 2019, the video has over 44 million views on YouTube.

The second music video for "Me Entrego a Ti", recorded live for the live album Primera Fila: Hecho Realidad, was released on May 18, 2015. It was directed by Nahuel Lerena. The video was filmed in Lake Charles, Louisiana. As of October 2019, the video has over 16 million views on YouTube.

The third video for "Me Entrego a Ti", recorded live for the live album Ha*Ash: En Vivo, was released on December 6, 2019. The video was filmed in Auditorio Nacional, Mexico City.

== Credits and personnel ==
Credits adapted from AllMusic and Genius.

Recording and management

- Recording Country: United States
- Sony / ATV Discos Music Publishing LLC / Westwood Publishing
- (P) 2005 Sony Music Entertainment México, S.A. De C.V.

Ha*Ash

- Ashley Grace – vocals, guitar
- Hanna Nicole – vocals, guitar

Additional personnel

- Áureo Baqueiro – recording engineer, arranger, director
- Soraya – songwriting.
- Gerardo García – guitar, acoustic guitar, mandoline.
- Tommy Morgan – harmonica.
- Gabe Witcher – violin.

== Charts ==
Chart	Position
Mexico (Monitor Latino)	4
US Latin Pop Songs (Billboard)	15

== Release history ==
Region	Date	Edition(s)	Format	Label	Ref.
Various	November 27, 2005	Standard	Single	Sony Music Latin	
Various	March 15, 2016	Acoustic Version	Digital download; streaming	Sony Music Latin	
Various	December 6, 2019	Live Version	Digital download; streaming	Sony Music Latin	
