= Éxitos Eternos (Soraya album) =

Greatest hits album by Soraya
- Released: 10 May 2005
- Recorded: 1995–2000
- Genre: Pop, latin pop, worldbeat
- Label: Universal Music
- Producer: Soraya

Soraya chronology
| El Otro Lado de Mi (2005) | Éxitos Eternos (2005) | Herencia (2006) |

Professional ratings
Review scores
| Source | Rating |
|---|---|
| Allmusic | 4/5 stars |

Éxitos Eternos (English: Eternal hits) is the first compilation album by Colombian-American singer-songwriter Soraya. It was released in 2005 by Universal Music.

== Track listing ==
1. De Repente
2. ¿En Dónde Estás?
3. Cuerpo Y Alma
4. París, Calí, Milán
5. Avalancha
6. Lejos De Aquí
7. Half
8. Torre De Marfil
9. En Esta Noche
10. When Did I Say That?
11. Quédate
12. Dance Of The Waiting
13. Pueblito Viejo
14. You And I
15. Cuerpo Y Alma (Multimedia Track)

== Personnel ==
- Valério Do Carmo → Art Direction, Illustrations
- Luis Gómez-Escolar → Translation
- Judy Figueroa → Graphic Design
- Bruce McIntosh → Compilation, Concept
- Randy Suarez → Critic, Project Coordinator
