= Éxitos Eternos =

Éxitos Eternos may refer to:

== Albums ==
- Éxitos Eternos (Soraya album)
- Éxitos Eternos (Mijares album)
- Éxitos Eternos, compilation album of Celia Cruz
- Éxitos Eternos, compilation album of Yndio
- Éxitos Eternos, compilation album of Marc Anthony
- Éxitos Eternos, compilation album of Frankie Ruiz
- Éxitos Eternos, compilation album of Oscar D'Leon
- Éxitos Eternos, compilation album of Tito Nieves
