= Solamente Tu Amor =

1996 single by Chayanne

Single by Chayanne

from the album Volver a Nacer
- Released: 1996
- Studio: After Hours, Miami, FL; Brimmer Music Co, Thousand Oaks, CA; Music Design Studios, Miami, FL; O'Henry Studios, Burbank, CA; Riot Music, Miami, FL; South Beach Studios, Miami, FL
- Genre: Latin pop
- Length: 3:25
- Label: Sony Discos
- Songwriter: Donato Poveda
- Producers: Marcello Azevedo, Hal Batt, Manny Benito, Estéfano, Ronnie Foster, Donato Póveda

Chayanne singles chronology
"Gavilán o Paloma" (1995)	"Solamente Tu Amor" (1996)	"Volver a Nacer" (1997)

"Solamente Tu Amor" ("Only Your Love") is a song written by Donato Poveda and performed by Puerto Rican singer Chayanne. It was released as the lead single from his seventh studio album Volver a Nacer. Its music video was filmed in Los Angeles. It was recognized as one of the best-performing songs of the year at the 1997 American Society of Composers, Authors and Publishers in the Pop/Rock category.

== Charts ==
=== Weekly charts ===
Chart (1996)	Peak position
US Hot Latin Songs (Billboard)	6
US Latin Pop Airplay (Billboard)	1

=== Year-end charts ===
Chart (1996)	Position
US Latin Pop Airplay (Billboard)	8

== See also ==
- List of Billboard Latin Pop Airplay number ones of 1996
