= Tu Mirada en Mi =

Single by Ha*Ash

from the album Mundos Opuestos
- Language: Spanish
- English title: "You look at me"
- Released: 22 April 2006
- Recorded: 2004–2005
- Genre: Latin pop; pop; power ballad
- Length: 4:13
- Label: Sony Music Latin
- Songwriters: Ashley Grace; Hanna Nicole; Áureo Baqueiro; Gian Marco
- Producer: Áureo Baqueiro

Ha*Ash singles chronology
"¿Qué Hago Yo?" (2006)	"Tu Mirada en Mi" (2006)	"No Te Quiero Nada" (2008)

Music video
- "Tu Mirada en Mi" on YouTube

"Tu Mirada en Mi" (transl. "You look at me") is a Latin pop song written and recorded by American duo Ha*Ash. It was released on April 22, 2006, as the fourth of the single from their second studio album Mundos Opuestos (2005).

== Background and release ==
"Tu Mirada en Mi" was written by Ashley Grace, Hanna Nicole, Áureo Baqueiro and Gian Marco and produced by Baqueiro. Is a song recorded by American duo Ha*Ash from her second studio album Mundos Opuestos (2005). It was released as the fourth single from the album on April 22, 2006, by Sony Music Entertainment.

== Commercial performance ==
The track peaked at number 50 in the Latin Pop Songs charts in the United States.

== Music video ==
A music video for "Tu Mirada en Mi" was released in April, 2006. Was published on her YouTube channel on October 24, 2009. It was directed by David Ruiz. As of October 2019, the video has over 62 million views on YouTube.

== Credits and personnel ==
Credits adapted from AllMusic and Genius.

Recording and management

- Recording Country: United States
- Sony / ATV Discos Music Publishing LLC / Westwood Publishing
- (P) 2005 Sony Music Entertainment México, S.A. De C.V.

Ha*Ash

- Ashley Grace – vocals, guitar
- Hanna Nicole – vocals, guitar

Additional personnel

- Áureo Baqueiro – songwriting, recording engineer, arranger, director
- Gian Marco – songwriting.
- Gerardo García – guitar, acoustic guitar, mandoline.
- Tommy Morgan – harmonica.
- Gabe Witcher – violin.

== Charts ==
Chart	Position
US Latin Pop Songs (Billboard)	24

== Awards and nominations ==
Year	Awards ceremony	Award	Results
2006	Premios Juventud	Favorite Song	Nominated

== Release history ==
Region	Date	Edition(s)	Format	Label	Ref.
Various	April 22, 2006	Standard	Single	Sony Music Latin	
