= Savannah Robinson =

American R&B singer (born 1998)

- Born: Savannah Noelle Robinson; November 20, 1998 (age 27); Los Angeles, California
- Occupations: Singer, songwriter
- Years active: 2010–present
- Label: Eleveneleven (2011–2012)

Savannah Noelle Robinson (born November 20, 1998) is an American R&B singer.

== Biography ==
She rose to prominence singing at local karaoke shows. Ryan Black heard Savannah in 2008 while he was having lunch outside in Culver City and a truck pulled up to a red light and a big booming voice came from the truck. Black looked over and saw a little girl singing at the top of her lungs so he rushed over before the light turned green & threw his business card to her father and asked him to call her. Her videos were being discovered and soon she was being booked in different venues. Her big break came in the summer of 2010 when she sang during the Long Beach Pride festival, performing twice on the smaller stage of the festival, and then she was asked to perform on the main festival stage. Her performance was taped and was released on the internet. She also was the opening singer at the Los Angeles Gay Pride Festival in 2010.

Following that, she appeared on local television on the Los Angeles KTTV show Good Day L.A.. She then appeared on American nationwide television on The Ellen DeGeneres Show on February 18, 2011, after Ellen DeGeneres saw her singing on YouTube and wanted to meet her in person. She was immediately signed to Ellen DeGeneres' record label eleveneleven in March 2011. Savannah came back to the show on March 30, 2011, to perform the song "And I Am Telling You I'm Not Going" with her favorite singer Jennifer Hudson. Savannah returns to be on The Ellen DeGeneres Show on November 11, 2011, to sing a cover of Christina Aguilera's "Beautiful". Savannah appeared singing Mariah Carey's "All I Want for Christmas Is You" on the Hollywood Christmas Parade in 2011. She was also on Anderson Cooper's talk show Anderson Live in November 2011 promoting Anti-Bullying.

== Discography ==
=== Extended plays ===
- Believe-Holiday (2011)
