= Ana Victoria =

Mexican-American singer-songwriter

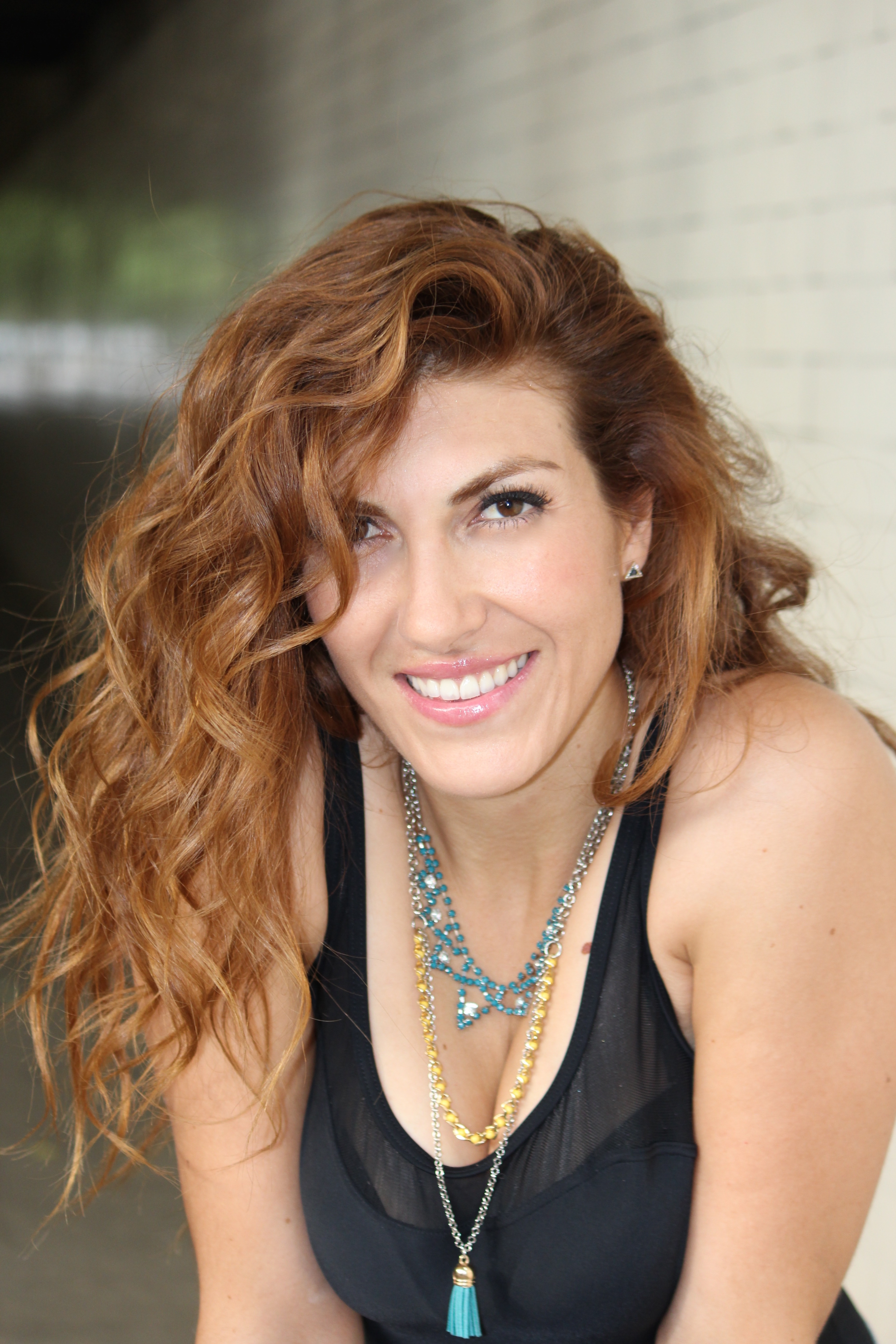
- Singer Songwriter Ana Victoria on set for her single "La Reina", 2015

Background information
- Also known as: AV
- Born: Ana Victoria Boccadoro Miguel; December 8, 1983 (age 42); Los Angeles, California, U.S.
- Origin: Manhattan Beach, California, U.S.
- Genres: Pop; electropop; rock
- Occupations: Singer; songwriter; dancer; producer
- Instrument: Vocals
- Years active: 1997–present
- Label: DIAM Music
- Website: anavictoria.com
- Parents: Amanda Miguel (mother); Diego Verdaguer (father)

Ana Victoria Boccadoro Miguel (born December 8, 1983) is an American and Mexican singer, songwriter, dancer and record producer. She is the daughter of the singers Amanda Miguel and Diego Verdaguer. In 2012 she was nominated for a Latin Grammy while most of her success is in Mexico.

== Biography ==
=== 2007-2010: Ready and AV ===
Ana Victoria is the daughter of Latin American singer-songwriters Amanda Miguel and Diego Verdaguer. She was born on December 8, 1983, in Los Angeles, California. At the age of 13 she began working as a backup singer for her parents.

In 2007 she released her first album, Ready, co-produced with Rob Meister and released under her parents label DIAM Music distributed by Warner Music Group. It included the songs "Siempre pude ver" (I could always see) and "P.D. Te amo" (PS I Love You) which reached the Mexican top 10 while the video for the first single won the Excellence Award at the Accolade Awards.

In April 2012 Ana Victoria released her second album, entitled "AV" co-produced by Axel Dupeyron. The eleven songs included a cover of her father's song "Yo No Lloro por Llorar" (I Don't Cry for the Sake of Crying) and the singles "Nada" and "Sorry".

=== 2012-2013: Latin Grammy Nomination and Color Amor ===
In 2012 she was nominated in the category "Best New Artist" at the Latin Grammy Awards. In 2009 a live DVD and CD Ana Victoria: En Vivo, was released. In early 2013 she performed two duets: "Más vale tarde que nunca" with Christian Chavez, and "Simplemente amor" with Erik Rubin. The covers album Color Amor was released on August 21, 2013. It included her first song in English, a rendition of "I Belong To You" by Lenny Kravitz.

== Discography ==
=== Studio albums ===
- 2007 - Ready
- 2012 - AV
- 2013 - Color Amor

=== Live albums ===
- 2009 - Ana Victoria: En Vivo

=== Singles ===
- 2007 - «Siempre pude ver»
- 2007 - «P.D. Te amo»
- 2007 - «La sombra de este amor»
- 2012 - «Yo no lloro por llorar»
- 2012 - «Nada»
- 2012 - «Más vale tarde que nunca» (with Christian Chávez)
- 2013 - «Simplemente amor» (with Erik Rubin)
- 2013 - «Si mañana no me ves»
- 2015 - «Beso de Consolación»
- 2016 - «Otoño»
- 2017 - «La Reina»

=== Tours ===
- 2013 - Color Amor Tour
- 2016 - Herencia Romántica Tour
