= Soraya (album) =

Studio album by Soraya
- Released: 6 May 2003
- Recorded: 2001–2003
- Genre: Latin pop, folk pop
- Length: 49:40
- Label: Capitol Latin
- Producer: Soraya

Soraya chronology
Cuerpo y Alma / I'm Yours (2000)	Soraya (2003)	El Otro Lado de Mi (2005)

Singles from Soraya
- 1. "Casi" Released: 2003; 2. "Sólo por Ti" Released: 2003; 3. "Miento" Released: 2004

Professional ratings
Review scores
Source	Rating
AllMusic	3.5/5 stars

Soraya is the fourth bilingual studio album by Colombian-American singer-songwriter Soraya, released on May 6, 2003, by EMI Music. The album won the Best Singer-Songwriter Album at the 2004 Latin Grammy Awards.

== Track listing ==
All tracks are written by Soraya, except where indicated.

Original release
No.	Title	Writer(s)	Length
1.	"Casi"		3:58
2.	"Sólo por Ti"		4:00
3.	"Ser Amado"		4:01
4.	"Miento"		5:13
5.	"Sin Explicación"		3:27
6.	"A Tu Lado"		4:35
7.	"Espejo"		4:01
8.	"Porque Te Quiero"	Soraya; J.C. Pérez	3:24
9.	"Prisionera"	Soraya; J.C. Pérez	3:39
10.	"Naufrago"		3:36
11.	"Casi" (acoustic)		4:11
12.	"Lie for You"		5:18

International version/English version

All tracks are written by Soraya, except where indicated.

International version/English version
No.	Title	Writer(s)	Length
1.	"Almost"		3:58
2.	"All for You"		4:00
3.	"Ser Amado"		3:49
4.	"Lie for You"		5:18
5.	"No Need to Explain"		3:27
6.	"A Tu Lado"		4:35
7.	"Reflection"		4:01
8.	"Porque Te Quiero"	Soraya; J.C. Pérez	3:24
9.	"Prisionera"	Soraya; J.C. Pérez	3:39
10.	"Shipwrecked"		3:36
11.	"Casi" (acoustic)		4:11
12.	"Miento"		5:25

== Charts ==
Chart (2003)	Peak position
US Top Latin Albums (Billboard)	25
US Latin Pop Albums (Billboard)	9
