= 1997 Latin Billboard Music Awards =

4th annual Billboard Latin Music Awards

1997 Billboard Latin Music Awards
- Date: April, 1997
- Venue: Gusman Center for the Performing Arts, Miami, Florida, United States

The 4th annual Billboard Latin Music Awards which honor the most popular albums, songs, and performers in Latin music took place in Miami.

== Pop ==
=== Song of the year ===
- Amame Una Vez Más — Amanda Miguel

=== Pop album of the year, Male ===
- Tango — Julio Iglesias

=== Pop album of the year, female ===
- Pies Descalzos — Shakira

=== Pop album of the year, duo or group ===
- Macarena Non Stop — Los del Río

=== Pop album of the year, new artist ===
- Pies Descalzos — Shakira

=== Pop video of the year ===
- Un Poco de Amor — Shakira

== Tropical/Salsa ==
=== Tropical/salsa song of the year ===
- Ironía — Frankie Ruiz

=== Tropical/salsa album of the year, male ===
- Auténtico — Manny Manuel

=== Tropical/salsa album of the year, female ===
- Dicen Que... — Albita

=== Tropical/salsa album of the year, duo or group ===
- La Makina...A Mil — La Makina

=== Tropical/salsa album of the year, new artist ===
- Dark Latin Groove — DLG

=== Tropical/salsa video of the year ===
- Oye Como Va — Tito Puente Jr.

== Regional Mexican ==
=== Regional Mexican song of the year ===
- El Príncipe — Grupo Límite

=== Regional Mexican album of the year, male ===
- Pedro Fernández — Pedro Fernández

=== Regional Mexican album of the year, female ===
- Siempre Selena — Selena

=== Regional Mexican album of the year, duo or group ===
- Unidos Para Siempre — Los Tigres del Norte

=== Regional Mexican album of the year, new artist ===
- Por Puro Amor — Grupo Límite

=== Regional Mexican video of the year ===
- Juan Sabor — La Tropa F

== Other awards ==
=== Hot latin tracks artist of the year ===
- Enrique Iglesias

=== Latin rap album of the year ===
- In Da House", Proyecto Uno

=== Latin rock album of the year ===
- Si El Norte Fuera El Sur — Ricardo Arjona

=== Contemporary Latin jazz album of the year ===
- Jazzin' — Tito Puente & La India With Count Basie Orchestra

=== Latin dance single of the year ===
- Cuba — El Mariachi

=== Latin dance album of the year ===
- Verano 96 — Various Artists

=== Songwriter of the year ===
- Marco Antonio Solís

=== Publisher of the year ===
- Fonomusic

=== Publishing corporation of the year ===
- Fonomusic

=== Producer of the year ===
- Marco Antonio Solís

=== Spirit Of Hope ===
- Emmanuel

=== Billboard Lifetime achievement award ===
- Herb Alpert

=== Billboard Latin Music Hall of Fame ===
- José José
