= Diego Verdaguer =

Mexican singer-songwriter (1951–2022)

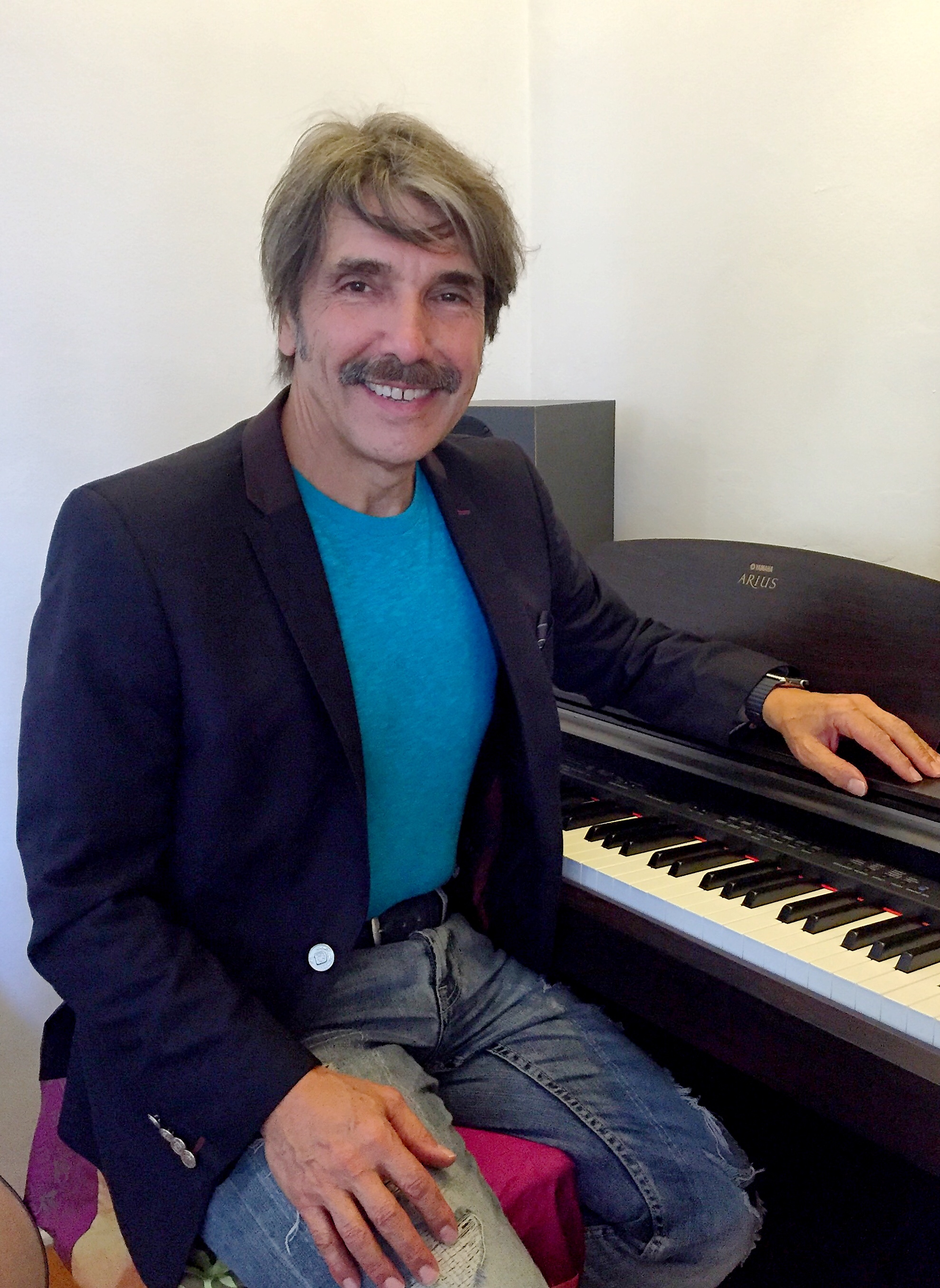
- Verdaguer in 2016
- Born: Miguel Atilio Boccadoro Hernández; 26 April 1951; Buenos Aires, Argentina
- Died: 27 January 2022 (aged 70); Los Angeles, California, United States
- Occupation: Musician
- Spouse: Amanda Miguel
- Children: Ana Victoria and Gimena Boccadoro
- Musical career
- Genres: Pop
- Instruments: Vocals, guitar, trumpet, bandoneon
- Years active: 1968–2022
- Labels: DIAM Music
- Website: diegoverdaguer.com

Miguel Atilio Boccadoro Hernández (26 April 1951 – 27 January 2022), known professionally as Diego Verdaguer (Spanish pronunciation: [ˈdjeɣo βeɾðaˈɣeɾ], was an Argentine-born Mexican singer.

== Biography ==
Verdaguer played the trumpet and the bandoneón. He was married to the singer Amanda Miguel. His most famous songs are "Volveré", "Corazón de Papel", "Usted Qué Haría", and "La Ladrona". He had a hit in 2009 after a decade of absence with the song "Voy a Conquistarte", written by the Mexican singer-songwriter Joan Sebastián. He had lifetime sales of almost 20 million records.

Verdaguer was born in Buenos Aires on 26 April 1951, and lived in Mexico from 1980 onwards.

He died from COVID-19 in Los Angeles on 27 January 2022, at the age of 70.

== Discography ==
Studio albums

- Volveré (1976)
- El pasadiscos (1978)
- El secreto callado (1979)
- Estoy vivo (1981)
- Coco loco (1982)
- Simplemente amor (1984)
- Estoy celoso (1986)
- Sigo vivo (1988)
- Lágrimas (1991)
- Inolvidable (1999)
- Mexicano hasta las Pampas (2009)
- Juego de valientes (2012)
- Mexicano hasta las Pampas 2 (2014)
- Orgánico (2017)
- Corazón Bambino (2019)

Live albums

- Siempre fuimos dos with Amanda Miguel (2003)
- El mejor show romántico de América with Amanda Miguel (2007)
- Mexicanísimos Vol. I with Amanda Miguel (2010)
- Mexicanísimos Vol. II with Amanda Miguel (2011)
- Pídeme (2011)

Books

- Camino al Escenario (2020)

== See also ==
- List of best-selling Latin music artists
