= Torre De Marfil =

Torre de Marfil

Studio album by Soraya
- Released: 21 October 1997
- Recorded: 1996–1997
- Genre: Folk-pop, latin pop, acoustic, adult contemporary
- Length: 50:21
- Label: Island, Mercury, Polydor
- Producer: Soraya, Peter Van Hooke, Rod Argent

Soraya chronology
En Esta Noche / On Nights Like This (1996)	Torre de Marfil (1997)	Cuerpo y Alma / I'm Yours (2000)

Singles from Torre de Marfil
- 1. "Lejos de Aquí" Released: 1997; 2. "Si Te Vas" Released: 1997; 3. "París, Calí, Milán" Released: 1998; 4. "Torre de Marfil" Released: 1998

Wall of Smiles

Professional ratings
Review scores
Source	Rating
Allmusic	3/5 stars

Torre de Marfil (English: Ivory Tower, released as Wall of Smiles in non-Spanish-speaking territories) is the second bilingual studio album by Colombian-American singer-songwriter Soraya, released on 21 October 1997 by Polydor Records and Universal Music. All the songs on the album except "Oropel" are original and were fully or partly composed by Soraya.

== Track listing ==
All songs written by Soraya, except where noted.

1. "Si Te Vas" – 4:12
2. "El Cruce" – 4:19
3. "Lejos de Aquí" – 4:34
4. "París, Cali, Milán" – 4:23
5. "Torre de Marfil" (Soraya, Carole King) – 4:50
6. "Es un Amor" – 6:23
7. "¿Será el Final?" – 4:20 (Soraya, Greg Wells, Mark Hudson)
8. "Dulce Amor" – 4:54
9. "Mi Dolor" – 3:32
10. "Cosas en la Vida" – 5:54
11. "Oropel" (Jorge Villamil) – 3:36

Wall of Smiles (English Version)

1. "Speak of Pain"
2. "Wall of Smiles"
3. "If I Lose You"
4. "Paris, Cali, Milan"
5. "So Far Away"
6. "Manhattan in the Sand"
7. "Crossroads"
8. "Cosas en la Vida"
9. "Sweet Love"
10. "Bottom Out"
11. "Oropel"
12. "Wall of Smiles" (Acoustic)
