= Mit Leib und Seele =

Mit Leib und Seele may refer to:

- Mit Leib und Seele (TV series)
- Mit Leib und Seele (Schandmaul album)
- Mit Leib und Seele, Kärbholz album
- "Mit Leib und Seele", Heinz Rudolf Kunze song
