= On Nights Like This =

En Esta Noche

Studio album by Soraya
- Released: February 6, 1996
- Recorded: 1994–1995
- Studios: Abbey Road Studios, London
- Genres: Pop, latin rock, worldbeat, folk, acoustic, adult contemporary
- Length: 40:06
- Labels: Island, London, Polydor
- Producers: Soraya, Peter Van Hooke, Rod Argent (executive)

Soraya chronology
| En Esta Noche (1996) | Torre de Marfil / Wall of Smiles (1997) |

Singles from En Esta Noche
- 1. "De Repente / Suddenly" Released: January 7, 1996; 2. "Quédate / Stay Awhile" Released: April 17, 1996; 3. "Amor En Tus Ojos" Released: September 10, 1996; 4. "Avalancha" Released: February 7, 1997

On Nights Like This

Professional ratings
Review scores
| Source | Rating |
|---|---|
| AllMusic | 4/5 stars |

En Esta Noche (On Nights Like This in non-Spanish-speaking territories) is the debut bilingual studio album by Colombian-American singer-songwriter Soraya, released on February 6, 1996, by Island Records. All the songs on the album except "Pueblito Viejo" are original and were fully or partly composed by Soraya.

Soraya recorded this album over the course of two years in Abbey Road Studios in London. The album is a fusion of many different genres and cultures from Colombia and world music.

== Track listing ==
All tracks written by Soraya, except "Pueblito Viejo," written by José A. Morales.

English version
| No. | Title | Producer(s) | Length |
|---|---|---|---|
| 1. | "Suddenly" | Rod Argent, Peter Van Hooke | 4:03 |
| 2. | "Stay Awhile" | Rod Argent, Peter Van Hooke | 4:14 |
| 3. | "Love In Your Eyes" | Rod Argent, Peter Van Hooke | 3:00 |
| 4. | "Avalanche" | Rod Argent | 4:11 |
| 5. | "Calm Before The Storm" | Rod Argent | 4:11 |
| 6. | "Ruins In My Mind" | Peter Van Hooke | 4:29 |
| 7. | "Need To Know" | Peter Van Hooke | 4:16 |
| 8. | "Reason To Believe" | Rod Argent, Peter Van Hooke | 4:17 |
| 9. | "On Nights Like This" | Rod Argent | 4:45 |
| 10. | "Pueblito Viejo" | Soraya | 3:55 |

Spanish version
| No. | Title | Producer(s) | Length |
|---|---|---|---|
| 1. | "De Repente" | Rod Argent, Peter Van Hooke | 4:03 |
| 2. | "Quédate" | Rod Argent, Peter Van Hooke | 4:14 |
| 3. | "Amor En Tus Ojos" | Rod Argent, Peter Van Hooke | 3:00 |
| 4. | "Avalancha" | Rod Argent | 4:11 |
| 5. | "Calma Antes de la Tormenta" | Rod Argent | 4:11 |
| 6. | "Las Ruinas en Mi Mente" | Peter Van Hooke | 4:29 |
| 7. | "Debo Saber" | Peter Van Hooke | 4:16 |
| 8. | "Razón Para Creer" | Rod Argent, Peter Van Hooke | 4:17 |
| 9. | "En Esta Noche" | Rod Argent | 4:45 |
| 10. | "Pueblito Viejo" | Soraya | 3:55 |

== Charts ==
| Chart (1996/1997) | Peak position |
|---|---|
| Argentina (CAPIF) | 5 |
| German Albums (Offizielle Top 100) | 5 |
| US Top Latin Albums (Billboard) | 31 |

=== Year-end charts ===
| Chart (1997) | Position |
|---|---|
| German Albums Chart | 23 |

== Certifications and sales ==
| Region | Certification | Certified units/sales |
|---|---|---|
| Colombia (ASINCOL) | Gold | 250,000 |
| Costa Rica (FONOTICA) | Gold | |
| Mexico (AMPROFON) | Gold | 100,000^{^} |
| Germany | — | 100,000 |
| Venezuela (APFV) | Gold | |
^{^} Shipments figures based on certification alone.
