= Casi (song) =

Single by Soraya

from the album Soraya
- B-side: "Almost"
- Released: 2003
- Genre: Latin pop, folk pop
- Length: 4:06
- Label: Capitol Latin
- Songwriter(s): Soraya
- Producer(s): Soraya

Soraya singles chronology
"¿En Dónde Estas?" (2000)	"Casi" (2003)	"Sólo por Ti" (2003)

"Casi" (English: "Almost") is a song by Colombian-American latin pop singer-songwriter Soraya. The song was released as the lead single from her fourth studio album Soraya (2003). The song was Soraya's first commercial single after she was diagnosed with breast cancer in 2000. After the announcement, Soraya took a hiatus between 2000 and 2003 to recover from her illness. The song was written, produced and recorded by Soraya. An English-language version called "Almost" was released in the English/international edition of the album.

== Track listing ==
CD Single
No.	Title	Length
1.	"Casi"	4:06
2.	"Almost"	4:06

== Chart performance ==
Chart (2003)	Peak position
US Hot Latin Songs (Billboard)	1
US Latin Pop Airplay (Billboard)	2
