= Quédate (Soraya song) =

Single by Soraya

from the album En Esta Noche / On Nights Like This
- B-side: "Reason To Believe"
- Released: 1996
- Genre: Pop, pop rock, adult contemporary
- Length: 4:12
- Label: Island
- Songwriter(s): Soraya
- Producer(s): Soraya, Peter Van Hooke, Rod Argent

Soraya singles chronology
"De Repente" (1996)	"Quédate" (1996)	"Amor en Tus Ojos" (1996)

"Quédate" (English: "Stay") is a song by Colombian-American latin pop singer-songwriter Soraya. The song was released as the second single from her bilingual debut studio album En Esta Noche / On Nights Like This (1996). The song was written, produced and recorded by Soraya. Peter Van Hooke and Rod Argent. An English-language version called "Stay Awhile" was released on the English/international edition of the album On Nights Like This.

== Track listing ==
No.	Title	Length
1.	"Quédate"	4:13
2.	"Stay Awhile"	4:11
3.	"Reason To Believe"	4:16

Chart (1996)	Peak position
US Hot Latin Songs (Billboard)	25
US Latin Pop Airplay (Billboard)	6
