= Amor en Tus Ojos =

1996 song by Soraya

"Amor En Tus Ojos"

Single by Soraya

from the album En Esta Noche / On Nights Like This
- Released: 1996
- Recorded: 1994
- Genre: Ballad, adult contemporary
- Length: 3:00
- Label: Island
- Songwriter(s): Soraya
- Producer(s): Soraya, Peter Van Hooke, Rod Argent

Soraya singles chronology
"Quédate" (1996)	"Amor En Tus Ojos" (1996)	"Avalanche" (1997)

Music video
- "Love In Your Eyes (Live)" on YouTube

"Amor En Tus Ojos" (lit. 'Love in Your Eyes') is a song by Colombian-American Latin pop singer-songwriter Soraya. The song was released as the third single from her bilingual debut studio album En Esta Noche / On Nights Like This (1996). The song was written, recorded and produced by Soraya, Peter Van Hooke and Rod Argent. An English-language version called "Love in Your Eyes" was released on the English/international edition of the album On Nights Like This.

== Track listing ==
No.	Title	Length
1.	"Amor En Tus Ojos"	3:00
2.	"Love in Your Eyes"	3:00

== Charts ==
Chart (1996)	Peak position
US Hot Latin Songs (Billboard)	6
US Latin Pop Airplay (Billboard)	1
