= Cuerpo y Alma =

Studio album by Soraya
- Released: 16 May 2000
- Recorded: 1998–1999
- Genre: Pop, latin pop, worldbeat, folk pop
- Length: 49:26
- Label: Mercury
- Producer: Soraya, Tony Nicholas

Soraya chronology
Torre de Marfil / Wall of Smiles (1997)	Cuerpo y Alma (2000)	Soraya (2003)

Singles from Cuerpo y Alma
- 1. "Cuerpo y Alma" Released: 2000; 2. "¿En Dónde Estas?" Released: 2000

I'm Yours

Professional ratings
Review scores
Source	Rating
Allmusic	3.5/5 stars

Cuerpo y Alma (I'm Yours in Non-Spanish-speaking territories) is the third bilingual studio album by Colombian-American singer-songwriter Soraya, released on May 16, 2000, by Universal Music Latin. All the songs on the album are original and were fully or partly composed by Soraya. On the 5 of July 2000, just 3 weeks after the release, Soraya was diagnosed with stage III breast cancer, and she had to put her career on hold, in order to recuperate.

"I'm yours" and "¿Where did you go?", were the only two singles that were released to promote the album, and even though Soraya couldn't promote them in person, they had great success in radio stations.

== Track listing ==
All songs written by Soraya, except where noted.

1. "Cuerpo y Alma" (Soul Solution Mix) – 3:49
2. "Algo Tan Mío" (Soraya, Tony Nicholas) – 4:23
3. "¿En Dónde Estas?" – 3:34
4. "Half" – 4:15
5. "When Did I Say That?" (Gary Burr, Soraya, Nicholas) – 4:19
6. "Tu Amor, Mi Amor" (Burr, Soraya) – 3:50
7. "You and I" (Soraya, Nicholas) – 3:51
8. "Need to Be Found" – 4:58
9. "Despues De Amar Así" (Soraya, Jane Wiedlin) – 4:00
10. "La Misma Historia" – 4:16
11. "Amigo Mío" – 4:24
12. "Dance of the Waiting" (Dominic Miller, Soraya, Wayne Kirkpatrick) – 3:49

I'm Yours (English Version)

1. "I'm Yours" (Soul Solution Mix)
2. "Sense of Belonging"
3. "Where Did You Go?"
4. "Half"
5. "When Did I Say That?"
6. "This Love"
7. "Tu y Yo"
8. "Need to Be Found"
9. "Bliss"
10. "La Misma Historia"
11. "I'll Be There"
12. "Dance of the Waiting"
13. "Where Did You Go?" (Niño Remix)
14. "Tu y Yo" (Soul Solution Mix)
