= Sólo por Ti =

Single by Soraya

from the album Soraya
- Released: 2003
- Genre: Latin pop, ballad
- Length: 4:00
- Label: Capitol Latin
- Songwriter(s): Soraya
- Producer(s): Soraya

Soraya singles chronology
"Casi" (2003)	"Sólo por Ti" (2003)	"Miento" (2004)

"Sólo por Ti" (English: "Only for You") is a song by Colombian-American latin pop singer-songwriter Soraya. The song was released as the second single from her fourth studio album Soraya (2003). The song was written, recorded and produced by Soraya. An English-language version called "All for You" was released on the English/international edition of the album.

== Track listing ==
CD Single
No.	Title	Length
1.	"Solo Por Ti (Version Album)"	4:00
2.	"Solo Por Ti (Swanky Groove Radio Edit Mix)"	3:59
3.	"Solo Por Ti (Swanky Groove Mix Extended)"	6:08

== Chart performance ==
Chart (2003)	Peak position
US Hot Latin Songs (Billboard)	18
US Latin Pop Airplay (Billboard)	13
