= El Otro Lado de Mi =

Studio album by Soraya
- Released: 1 March 2005
- Recorded: 2003–2005
- Genre: Latin pop, latin rock, folk
- Length: 48:48
- Label: Capitol Latin
- Producer: Soraya

Soraya chronology
Soraya (2003)	El Otro Lado de Mi (2005)	Éxitos Eternos (2005)

Singles from Soraya
- 1. "Llévame/Lead Me" Released: 2005; 2. "Como Sería" Released: 2005; 3. "Un Segundo Lento" Released: 2005

Professional ratings
Review scores
Source	Rating
Allmusic	4/5 stars

El Otro Lado De Mi (English: "The Other Side of Me") is the fifth and final studio album by Colombian-American singer-songwriter Soraya, released on March 1, 2005 by EMI Latin. The album was also nominated for a Latin Grammy for "Best Latin Pop Female Album" in 2005.

== Track listing ==
All tracks are written by Soraya; except where indicated.

No.	Title	Writer(s)	Length
1.	"Ser"		3:19
2.	"Llévame"		3:38
3.	"Como Sería"	Soraya, Olgui Chirino	4:23
4.	"Sin Tu Amor"		4:20
5.	"El Otro Lado de Mi"		3:43
6.	"Un Segundo Lento"		4:13
7.	"La Promesa"		3:15
8.	"Alma de la Calle"		4:45
9.	"Un Mundo Sin Prisa"		3:43
10.	"Tiempo"	Soraya, Gianmarco	3:36
11.	"Gotas de Perdon"		3:43
12.	"Lead Me"		3:38
