= Cuerpo y Alma (song) =

2000 single by Soraya

Single by Soraya

from the album Cuerpo y Alma
- Released: 2000
- Genre: Latin pop, worldbeat, middle eastern
- Length: 3:52
- Label: Mercury
- Songwriter(s): Soraya
- Producer(s): Soraya, Tony Nicholas

Soraya singles chronology
"Torre de Marfil" (1998)	"Cuerpo y Alma" (2000)	"¿En Dónde Estas?" (2000)

"Cuerpo y Alma" (English: "Body and Soul") is a song by Colombian-American latin pop singer-songwriter Soraya. The song was released as the lead single from her third bilingual studio album Cuerpo y Alma (2000). The song was written, produced and recorded by Soraya and Tony Nicholas. An English-language version called "I'm Yours" was released in the English/international edition of the album I'm Yours in Germany.

== Track listing ==
CD Single
No.	Title	Length
1.	"Cuerpo y Alma (Soul Solution Mix)"	3:49
2.	"Cuerpo y Alma (CD Single)"	4:22

Chart (1996)	Peak position
US Latin Pop Airplay (Billboard)	27
