= De Repente =

"De Repente / Suddenly"

Single by Soraya

from the album En Esta Noche / On Nights Like This
- B-side: "Suddenly"
- Released: 1996
- Recorded: 1995
- Genre: Latin pop, ballad, adult contemporary
- Length: 4:04
- Label: Island; Polydor
- Songwriter: Soraya
- Producers: Soraya; Peter Van Hooke; Rod Argent

Soraya singles chronology
"De Repente / Suddenly" (1996)	"Quédate" (1996)

Suddenly cover

Music video
- "De repente" on YouTube

"De Repente" (English: "Suddenly") is a song by Colombian-American singer-songwriter Soraya, taken from her bilingual debut studio album En Esta Noche / On Nights Like This. It was released in 1996 by Island Records and Polydor Records as the lead single from the album. The song was written by Soraya and produced by Soraya, Peter Van Hooke and Rod Argent.

== Track listings ==
CD single

1. "De Repente"
2. "Suddenly"
3. "Avalanche (Live)"

== Chart performance ==
Chart (1996)	Peak position
US Adult Contemporary (Billboard)	21
US Hot Latin Songs (Billboard)	5
US Latin Pop Airplay (Billboard)	1
