= Amanda Miguel =

Mexican singer (born 1956)

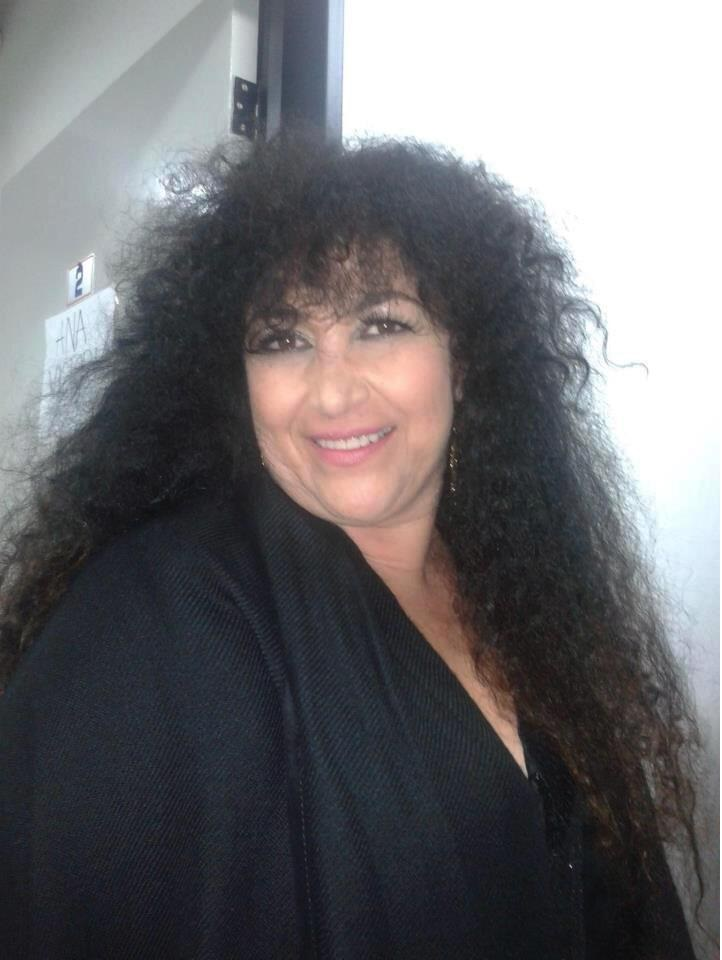
- Amanda Miguel

Background information
- Born: 1 June 1956 (age 70); Gaiman, Chubut, Argentina
- Genres: Latin ballad
- Years active: 1980–present
- Label: DIAM Music
- Spouse: Diego Verdaguer (m. 1975; died. 2022)
- Website: amandamiguel.com
- children: Ana Victoria Boccadoro

Amanda Antonia Miguel Samso (born 1 June 1956) is an Argentine-born Mexican singer-songwriter, pianist and businesswoman.

With more than 36 years of artistic career, Amanda Miguel has released 12 studio albums, has sold over 15 million copies around the world and has received multiple gold and platinum disc certifications.

== Early life ==
Miguel was born in Gaiman, in the Chubut Province in Argentina, June 1, 1956.

== Career ==
At 17, she met Diego Verdaguer, a man five years her senior, whom she would later marry. At this time, Verdaguer was already an established artist, and she joined his musical group called Mediterráneo. The group enjoyed success in Los Angeles, California, but after being discovered by a Univision network record executive, she launched her own solo career with help from Diego.

Miguel's first album, El Sonido Vol. 1, was recorded in 1981, and released a year later. Implementing a different sound and style than Mediterráneo, her album was a success. Follow-up albums were released a year later. Songs during this period, such as Asi No Te Amara Jamas, Él Me Mintió (1981), and Mi Buen Corazón (1982) have become staples of Los Angeles radio stations for KRCD-FM Recuerdo 103.9/98.3 FM.

The birth of their daughter, Ana Victoria, led Miguel to break from the recording studio and focus on motherhood.

She would return to the music scene in 1987, with her fourth album, El Pecado. In 1989 she recorded her fifth studio album, El rostro del Amor, with lyrics by Anahi van Zandweghe. Its title song was chosen to greet Pope John Paul II in his visit to Mexico.

For her sixth album, Rompecorazones, she delved in the world of ranchero music. Under the supervision of composer Federico Mendez, he chose her songs, including the title song, which became great hits.

In 1996, Miguel traveled to Italy where she recorded Amame una vez más, also with lyrics by Anahi in the title song and most of the others. The album was released the same year and was met with critical praise and highly positive sales in the United States and Latin America. The title track was nominated for a Lo Nuestro Award for Pop Song of the Year.

She returned in 1998 to record once more. The album 5 Dias was released the following year. It included a remake of the song "Así Como Hoy", which Diego produced.

In 2005, she released her album Piedra de Afilar. This album brought in newcomer, multi-instrumentalist David Snow as a co-producer with her longtime husband/producer Diego Verdaguer. This album shows Amanda to be looking ahead to a more modern sound without losing the polished productions and fabulous songs that made her famous. This album also contains a long-awaited duet between Miguel and Diego, "Siempre Fuimos Dos", penned by David Snow, Diego Verdaguer and Miguel, with lyrics by Anahi, who also wrote all the other lyrics in the album.

== Personal life ==
Amanda was married to Diego Verdaguer, another Argentine-Mexican singer, until his death January 28, 2022. They were living in Los Angeles at the time of his death.

== Studio albums ==
- 1981 - El Sonido Volumen I
- 1983 - El Sonido Volumen II
- 1984 - El Ultimo Sonido Volumen III
- 1987 - El Pecado
- 1989 - El Rostro Del Amor
- 1992 - Rompecorazones
- 1996 - Amame Una Vez Mas
- 1999 - 5 Dias
- 2004 - Feliz Navidad A Toda La Humanidad
- 2005 - Serie Plantino 20 Exitos de Amanda Miguel
- 2006 - Piedra de Afilar
- 2006 - El Rostro del Amor (CD + DVD) [Re-Edicion]
- 2007 - Latin Classics Amanda Miguel
- 2007 - Piedra de Afilar (CD + Multimedia) [Re-Edicion]
- 2008 - Anillo de Compromiso
- 2011 - El Sonido Volumen I (2011 Remasterizado)
- 2013 - El Sonido Volumen II (2013 Remasterizado)
- 2014 - El Ultimo Sonido Volumen III (2014 Remasterizado)
- 2015 - 80*15

== Compilations and singles ==
- 1980 - Papa, Cuando Regreses - "Tengo que confesar que lo amaba" (Single)
- 1981 - Así No Te Amará Jamás - Quiero Un Amor Total
- 1981 - Él Me Mintió - Amanda Al Piano
- 1982 - Mi Buen Corazón - Hagamos Un Trato
- 1982 - ¿Quien Será? - Siempre Te Amare
- 1983 - Castillos - Un Día De Estos
- 1983 - Como Un Títere - Poquito A Poco
- 1983 - Cosquillas En El Pecho - Igual Que Un Avión
- 1984 - El Gato Y Yo - ¿A Donde Va?
- 1987 - ¿Qué Me Das? (Single)
- 1988 - Ojos De Alquitran (Maxi Single)
- 1994 - 16 Kilates (Compilation)
- 1996 - 20 Exitos (Compilation)
- 1997 - Exitos (Compilation)
- 1999 - Serie Millennium 21 (Compilation)
- 2000 - 15 Kilates (Compilation)
- 2005 - Serie Plantino 20 Exitos de Amanda Miguel
- 2005 - Siempre Fuimos Dos - En vivo UN SHOW UNICO - CD + DVD (Compilation with Diego Verdaguer)
- 2006 - Latin Classics Amanda Miguel
- 2008 - En concierto- (compilation with Diego Verdaguer)
- 2015 - Vaya Pedazo De Rey

== See also ==
- List of best-selling Latin music artists
- Women in Latin music
