= Soraya (musician) =

Colombian-American singer-songwriter (1969–2006)

- Promotional photo

Background information
- Born: Soraya Raquel Lamilla Cuevas; March 11, 1969; Point Pleasant, New Jersey, United States
- Died: May 10, 2006 (aged 37) Miami, Florida, United States
- Genres: Latin pop; pop rock; alternative rock; world; folk
- Occupations: Singer-songwriter; guitarist; arranger; record producer
- Instruments: Vocals; guitar; piano
- Years active: 1996–2006
- Labels: Island; Polydor; Mercury; EMI; Capitol
- Website: soraya.com

Soraya Raquel Lamilla Cuevas (March 11, 1969 – May 10, 2006) was a Colombian-American singer-songwriter, guitarist, arranger and record producer.

A successful Colombian music star, she had two number-one songs on Billboard's Latin Pop Airplay charts. She won a 2004 Latin Grammy Award for "Best Album by Songwriter" for the self-titled album Soraya, which she produced, and received a 2005 Latin Grammy Award nomination for "Female Pop Vocal Album" for her album El Otro Lado de Mí (literally "The Other Side of Me"). She was the opening act for the 2005 Billboard Latin Music Awards. Her career spanned ten years, and she recorded five albums.

Soraya died on May 10, 2006, following a long struggle against breast cancer.

== Biography ==
=== Early life ===
Soraya Raquel Lamilla Cuevas was born in Point Pleasant, New Jersey, to a Colombian father and a Lebanese mother, a year after her father, mother, and brother moved to the United States from their native Colombia. The family moved back to Colombia when she was a baby, but when Soraya was eight years old, they returned to New Jersey. "Soraya" is a common name in the Middle East, and its meaning can be translated as "Pleiades". Soraya's maternal relatives were Lebanese Christians who emigrated from Lebanon to Colombia. Soraya's mother, Yamila Cuevas Gharib, had been a housewife in Colombia. Soraya's father, Gregorio Lamilla, worked for an exporting company in Colombia. In the U.S., life was hard for the family, so to make ends meet, he worked three or four jobs. Both parents are native of Cali.

Soraya first became interested in music at age 5 when she heard her uncle playing music in Colombia. He played "Pueblito Viejo", a Colombian traditional folk song using an instrument called the tiple, which is a kind of guitar with triple strings. Her parents bought her a guitar, which she taught herself how to play. She became proficient in classical violin, and her first public performance was at Carnegie Hall in New York City as a member of the N.Y.C. Youth Philharmonic. She was valedictorian of her class at Point Pleasant Borough High School, where she began writing her own music.

Soraya was 12 years old when her mother was first diagnosed with breast cancer, 18 when her mother had a recurrence, and 22 when her mother died in 1992. Soraya said that her sense of responsibility increased because she needed to take care of her mother and do all the household chores. She would also accompany her mother to the doctor's office; together they did breast-cancer research and participated in the Race for the Cure.

Soraya attended Rutgers University in New Jersey, where she studied English literature, French philosophy, and women's studies. Initially, she worried that she might be too shy to play before big crowds, but she eventually triumphed over her fear and realized her tremendous talent as a live performer when she played to rapt audiences at coffee houses and rallies around the sprawling Rutgers campus. She worked as a flight attendant before starting her music career.

=== Musical career ===
Soraya obtained a record contract with Polygram Records/Island Records in 1994. Her first album, released two years later simultaneously in both English and Spanish, was titled On Nights Like This / En Esta Noche. Both versions received positive critical acclaim and enabled her to tour in the U.S., Latin America and Europe, as a guest performer in concerts for musicians such as Natalie Merchant, Zucchero, Sting, Michael Bolton and Alanis Morissette.

Her songs climbed to the top of the charts in the Latin American, European, and U.S. Hispanic markets. Her first single, "Suddenly/De Repente", reached No. 1 in Billboard Latin Pop listings, with the English version receiving some mainstream Adult Contemporary airplay. Her second album, Torre de Marfil / Wall of Smiles, titled after a song co-written with her idol Carole King, was released in late 1997, and helped her attain worldwide recognition.

In 2000, Soraya was diagnosed with Stage III breast cancer, shortly after the release of her third album Cuerpo y alma / I'm Yours — just days before she was about to tour and promote it. She took time off to fight the illness.

Feeling healthy and in remission, Soraya returned to the music scene in 2003 with the release of her fourth and self-titled album, Soraya. The songs reflected her struggles, beliefs and love for life. She composed, produced, and arranged the album, which won the Latin Grammy for "Best Album by a Singer-Songwriter".

She created one more successful album, El Otro Lado de Mí, before dying from cancer in 2006.

=== Death ===
Soraya died of breast cancer in Miami, Florida on May 10, 2006, aged 37. She was first diagnosed in 2000, at the age of 31, after finding a lump while conducting a routine self-examination. She was diagnosed at Stage III and had a double mastectomy and breast reconstruction as well as radiation therapy and chemotherapy. Soraya had also lost her mother, a grandmother, and a maternal aunt to breast cancer.

=== Breast cancer advocate ===
Soraya was an advocate of breast cancer support and education, especially for Hispanic women. She became the first Latin spokesperson for the Susan G. Komen Breast Cancer Foundation, touring the Americas to raise awareness. During September and October, she took a break from her music career to focus on breast cancer awareness.

To encourage other women, Soraya wrote and recorded "No One Else/Por Ser Quien Soy", a song that reflects her experience in fighting breast cancer. Both tracks can be downloaded on her official website. All proceeds benefit the Susan G. Komen Foundation.

"I know there are many questions without answers and that hope doesn't leave with me, and above all, that my mission does not end with my physical story," were Soraya's last words to her fans and the media before her death.

== Discography ==
=== Studio albums ===
- En Esta Noche / On Nights Like This (1996)
- Torre de Marfil / Wall of Smiles (1997)
- Cuerpo y Alma / I'm Yours (2000)
- Soraya (2003)
- El Otro Lado de Mí (2005)

=== Compilations ===
- (1996) Sálvame/Save Me Tributo a Queen: Los Más Grandes del Rock en Español
- (1998) Todo Lo Que Él Hace (Every Little Thing She Does Is Magic) on Outlandos D'Americas
- (2001) Desert Roses and Arabian Rhythms, Vol. 1
- (2001) Serie 32
- (2003) Essentiales (The Ultimate Collection)
- (2005) Éxitos Eternos
- (2005) The Best of Soraya (20th Century Masters – The Millennium Collection)
- (2005) Dreaming of You with Barrio Boyzz, Selena Vive! (Tribute to Selena)
- (2006) Gold (2-CD best-of)
- (2006) Herencia
- (2006) Entre Su Ritmo y el Silencio
