= Belinda Peregrín discography =

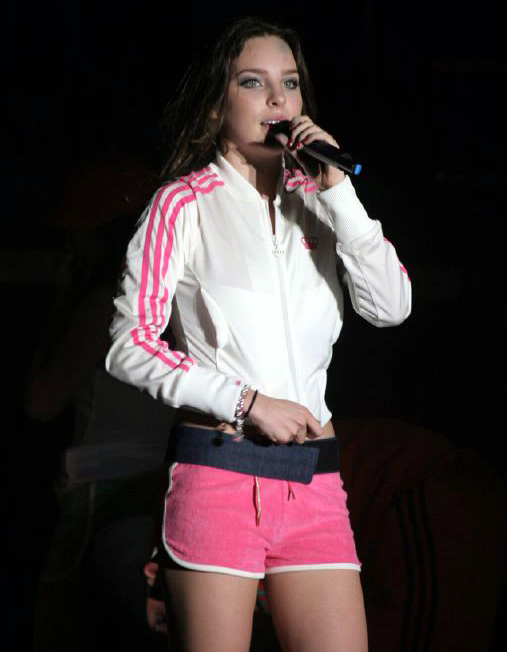
- Belinda performing in Monterrey
- Studio albums: 4
- Extended plays: 4
- Soundtrack albums: 5
- Compilation albums: 2
- Singles: 20
- Video albums: 2
- Music videos: 22
- Promotional singles: 3

Mexican singer-songwriter Belinda Peregrín has released four studio albums, four EPs, five soundtracks, twenty-three singles, two DVDs, and twenty-two music videos. Billboard mentioned her as "The Latin Pop Princess". As of 2006, Belinda was listed as the third best-selling female Mexican artist in the United States, together, her four studio albums and soundtracks with over two million records sold, behind only Thalía and Paulina Rubio. Together, her four studio albums have sold over two million copies worldwide.

== Albums ==
=== Studio albums ===
Title	Album details	Peak chart positions						Certifications (sales thresholds)	Sales
Title	Album details	MEX	US Latin Pop	US Top Latin	US Top Heat	ARG	SPA	Certifications (sales thresholds)	Sales
Belinda	Release date: August 5, 2003; Label: Sony BMG, RCA; Formats: CD, digital download	1	6	28	4^{[A]}	—	40	US: Platinum (Latin); ARG: Gold; MEX: 2× Platinum + Gold	MEX: 225,000; US: 177,000
Utopía	Release date: October 3, 2006; Label: EMI Televisa Music; Formats: CD, digital download	3	8	20	19	—	20	ARG: Gold; MEX: Platinum	MEX: 150,000; US: 79,000
Carpe Diem	Release date: March 23, 2010; Label: EMI, Capitol Latin; Formats: CD, digital download	7	3	12	21	5	—	MEX: Gold	MEX: 30,000; US: 13,480
Catarsis	Release date: July 2, 2013; Label: Capitol Latin, UMLE; Formats: CD, digital download	1	2	4	9	—	—		
Indómita	Release date: June 5, 2025; Label: Warner Music Latina; Formats: CD, digital download	1	12	—	—	—	—		
"—" denotes releases that did not chart or were not released

=== Compilation albums ===
Title	Album details
Total	Released: November 16, 2006; Label: Sony BMG; Formats: CD, digital download
Lo Esencial De Belinda	Released: November 2009; Label: Sony BMG; Formats: CD, digital download
Brillantes	Released: September 23, 2014; Label: Sony BMG; Formats: CD

=== Soundtracks ===
Title	Album details	Peak chart positions					Certifications (sales thresholds)	Sales
Title	Album details	MEX	US	US Latin Pop	US Top Latin	US Regional	Certifications (sales thresholds)	Sales
Amigos X Siempre	Release Date: February 17, 2000; Label: Sony BMG; Formats: CD, cassette	1	—	15	47	—	MEX: 2× Platinum + Gold	MEX: 250,000
Aventuras En El Tiempo	Release Date: July 31, 2001; Label: Fonovisa; Formats: CD, cassette	1	—	—	—	—	MEX: Platinum + Gold	MEX: 150,000
Cómplices Al Rescate: Silvana	Release Date: February 14, 2002; Label: Sony BMG, RCA, Fonovisa; Formats: CD, cassette	2	—	5	6	—	MEX: Platinum + Gold	MEX: 150,000; WW: 1,000,000
Cómplices Al Rescate: Mariana	Release Date: February 14, 2002; Label: Sony BMG, RCA, Fonovisa; Formats: CD, cassette	1	—	—	5	1	MEX: Platinum + Gold	MEX: 150,000; WW: 1,000,000
The Cheetah Girls 2	Release Date: August 15, 2006; Label: Walt Disney Records; Formats: CD, digital download	68	5	—	—	—	US: Platinum; ARG: Gold; UK: Silver	US: 1,500,000
"—" denotes releases that did not chart or weren't released

== EPs ==
Title	Album details
Utopía 2 EP	Released: September 25, 2007; Label: EMI Televisa Music; Formats: Digital download
If We Were EP	Released: November 23, 2007; Label: EMI Televisa Music; Formats: CD, digital download
See A Little Light EP	Released: April 21, 2008; Label: EMI Televisa Music; Formats: CD, digital download
Belinda Acceso Total	Released: March 23, 2010; Label: Capitol Latin; Formats: Digital download

== Singles ==
=== As lead artist ===
List of singles as lead artist, with selected chart positions and certifications, showing year released and album name
Title	Year	Peak chart positions					Certifications	Album
Title	Year	SPA	US Latin	US Latin Airplay	US Latin Pop	US Trop.	Certifications	Album
"Lo Siento"	2003	—	—	—	34	—		Belinda
"Boba Niña Nice"	2003	—	—	—	—	—		Belinda
"Ángel"	2004	—	—	—	—	—	AMPROFON: Gold	Belinda
"Vivir"	2004	—	—	—	—	—		Belinda
"No Entiendo" (featuring Andy & Lucas)	2004	—	—	—	—	—		Belinda
"Be Free"	2005	—	—	—	—	—		Belinda
"¿Dónde Iré Yo?"	2005	—	—	—	—	—		Belinda
"Ni Freud ni tu mamá"	2006	—	38	38	16	31		Utopía
"Bella Traición"	2007	—	14	14	12	11		Utopía
"Luz Sin Gravedad"	2007	—	—	—	29	—		Utopía
"Alguien Más"	2007	—	—	—	—	—		Utopía
"Es De Verdad"	2007	—	41	41	18	—		Utopía
"If We Were"	2007	—	—	—	—	—		Utopía
"See A Little Light"	2008	—	—	—	—	—		Utopía
"Egoísta" (featuring Pitbull)	2010	—	28	28	18	29		Carpe Diem
"Dopamina"	2010	—	—	—	—	—		Carpe Diem
"En El Amor Hay Que Perdonar"	2012	—	39	39	18	—		Catarsis
"En la Obscuridad"	2012	—	33	—	9	—	APFV: Platinum	Catarsis
"Nada"	2013	—	—	—	—	—		Catarsis
"I Love You... Te Quiero" (featuring Pitbull)	2014	—	—	—	19	—		Catarsis
"Báilalo" (featuring Steve Aoki and Zion & Lennox)	2020	—	—	—	—	—		TBA
"Madrid X Marbella" (with Juan Magán)	2020	—	—	—	—	—		Non-album single
"Flamenkito" (with Lerica)	2020	15	—	—	—	—	PROMUSICAE: 2× Platinum	Cocoterapia
"Si Nos Dejan" (with Christian Nodal)	2021	—	—	—	—	—		Non-album single
"Mentiras Cabrón"	2022	—	—	—	—	—		TBA
"Eden"	2022	—	—	—	—	—		Non-album singles
"Colorblind"	2022	—	—	—	—	—		Non-album singles
"Las 12" (with Ana Mena)	2022	7	—	—	—	—	PROMUSICAE: 6× Platinum	Bellodrama
"Si Tú Me Llamas (BSO Tadeo Jones 3)" (with Omar Montes)	2022	7	—	—	—	—		Non-album single
"No Estamos Tan Locos" (with Lerica)	2022	—	—	—	—	—		TBA
"Me Encantaría" (with Abraham Mateo)	2022	—	—	—	—	—		TBA
"Cactus"	2024	—	—	—	—	—	AMPROFON: Platinum	Indómita
"300 Noches" (with Natanael Cano)	2024	—	41	—	—	—	AMPROFON: 3× Platinum	Indómita
"Bugatti"	2024	—	41	—	—	—		Indómita
"LA MALA"	2024	—	—	—	—	—		Indómita
"JACKPOT" (with Kenia Os)	2024	—	41	—	—	—	AMPROFON: Gold	Indómita
"La Cuadrada" (with Tito Double P)	2025	—	—	—	—	—	AMPROFON: Gold	Indómita
"Mírame Feliz" (with Xavi)	2025	—	—	—	—	—		Indómita
"—" denotes releases that did not chart or weren't released

=== Promotional singles ===
List of promotional singles, with selected chart positions, showing year released and album name
Title	Year	Peaks	Album
Title	Year	US Latin Pop	Album
"Sal de Mi Piel"	2009	31	Carpe Diem
"Culpable"	2010	—	Carpe Diem
"Lolita"	2010	—	Carpe Diem
"—" denotes releases that did not chart or were not released in that territory.

=== As featured artist ===
Title	Year	Peak chart positions				Certification	Album
Title	Year	US Hot 100	US Pop	SPA	ITA	Certification	Album
"Muriendo Lento" (Moderatto featuring Belinda)	2005	—	—	—	—		Detector de metal
"Amigas Cheetahs" (The Cheetah Girls featuring Belinda)	2006	110	87	—	—		The Cheetah Girls 2
"Dance With Me" (Drew Seeley featuring Belinda)	2006	120	—	—	—		The Cheetah Girls 2
"Te quiero (Spanglish Remix)" (Flex featuring Belinda)	2008	86	1	—	—	AMPROFON: Diamond + gold	Te Quiero
"Your Hero" (Finley featuring Belinda)	2008	—	—	—	40		Adrenalina 2
"Somos El Mundo" (with various artists)	2010	—	—	31	—		Non-album single
"Ay Haití" (with various artists)	2010	—	—	1	—	PROMUSICAE: Platinum	Non-album single
"Que Cante la Vida" (with various artists)	2010	—	—	—	—		Non-album single
"Meu Menino (Minha Menina)" (Luan Santana with Belinda)	2011	—	—	—	—		Ao Vivo no Rio
"Te Voy A Esperar" (Juan Magán with Belinda)	2012	—	—	1	—	PROMUSICAE: Platinum	Non-album single
"Constantemente Mía" (Il Volo featuring Belinda)	2013	—	—	—	—		Más Que Amor
"Sueño De Ti" (Motel featuring Belinda)	2013	—	—	—	—		Prisma
"Translation" (Vein featuring Belinda and J Balvin)	2014	—	—	—	—		Non-album single
"Si No Te Quisiera" (Juan Magan featuring Belinda & Lapiz Conciente)	2014	—	—	1	—	PROMUSICAE: 2× Platinum; AMPROFON: Gold; RIAA: Gold	The King Is Back Volume 1
"Luz" (with various artists)	2016	—	—	—	—		México Se Pinta De Luz
"Déjate Llevar" (with Juan Magán and Manuel Turizo featuring Snova and B-Case)	2017	—	—	8	—	AMPROFON: Platinum + gold; PROMUSICAE: 2× Platinum	4.0
"Un Traguito" (with Lérica)	2019	—	—	65	—	PROMUSICAE: Platinum	De cero
"Amor A Primera Vista" (with Los Ángeles Azules and Lalo Ebratt featuring Horacio Palencia)	2019	—	—	—	—	AMPROFON: 2× Diamond + platinum + gold	De Buenos Aires para el mundo
"La Chapa Que Vibran (Remix)" (with La Materialista and Jojo Marontinni featuring Topo La Maskara)	2019	—	—	—	—		TBA
"Resistiré México" (among Artists for Mexico)	2020	—	—	—	—	PROMUSICAE: Platinum	Non-album single
"La Niña de la Escuela" (Lola Índigo featuring Tini and Belinda)	2021	—	—	9	—	PROMUSICAE: 4× Platinum; CAPIF: Platinum	La Niña
"Llórame Un Río" (Enrique Iglesias featuring Belinda )	2024	—	—	—	—		Final Vol. 2
"Blink Twice (Dos Veces Remix)" (Bini featuring Belinda)	2025	—	—	—	—		
"Snowman" (Remix) (Sia featuring Belinda)	2025	—	—	—	—		
"—" denotes releases that did not chart or weren't released

== DVDs ==
Album details	Year	Certifications (sales thresholds)
Fiesta en la Azotea: En Vivo Desde el Auditorio Nacional: Released: February 15, 2005; Label: Sony BMG, RCA; Formats: DVD	2005	MEX: Platinum + gold
In Concert: The Party's Just Begun Tour: Released: July 10, 2007; Label: Walt Disney Records; Formats: DVD	2007	

== Videography ==
=== Music videos ===
Title	Year	Director(s)
"Lo Siento"	2003	Oliver Castro
"Boba Niña Nice"	2003	Victor González
"Ángel"	2004	Alejandro Lozano
"Vivir"	2004	Alejandro Lozano
"No Entiendo" (with Andy & Lucas)	2004	
"Be Free"	2005	Rodolfo Ladiga
"Ni Freud Ni Tu Mamá"	2006	Scott Speer
"Bella Traición"	2007	Scott Speer
"Luz Sin Gravedad"	2007	Scott Speer
"Alguien Más"	2007	Scott Speer
"If We Were"	2007	Scott Speer
"See A Little Light"	2008	Scott Speer
"Egoísta" (with Pitbull)	2010	Belinda and Vance Burberry
"Lolita"	2010	MTV Co.
"Dopamina"	2011	Belinda and Julio Carlos
"En El Amor Hay Que Perdonar"	2012	Belinda and Daniel Shain
"En la Obscuridad"	2013	Daniel Shain
"I Love You... Te Quiero" (with Pitbull)	2014	Ernesto Yáñez
"Báilalo" (featuring Steve Aoki and Zion & Lennox)	2020	Criss Angel
"Cactus"	2024	Lariss De La Vega/Kathya Velazquez
"300 Noches" (with Natanael Cano)	2024	Lariss De La Vega/Kathya Velazquez
"LA MALA"	2024	Salomón Simhon
"Blink Twice (Dos Veces Remix)" (with Bini)	2025	Kerbs Balagtas

=== Other music videos ===
Title	Year	Artist	Director(s)
"Déjate Llevar"	2017	Juan Magán, Belinda, Manuel Turizo, Snova, B-Case	Alejandro Pérez

=== Guest music videos ===
Title	Year	Director(s)
"Muriendo Lento" (Moderatto featuring Belinda)	2005	Alejandro Romero/Alonso Ocejo/Rodrigo Valdés
"Dance With Me" (Drew Seeley featuring Belinda)	2006	Kenny Ortega
"Your Hero" (Finley featuring Belinda)	2008	Gaetano Morbioli
"Te Quiero (Remix)" (Flex featuring Belinda)	2008	Billy Mann
"Te Voy A Esperar" (Juan Magán featuring Belinda)	2012	Juan De La Vega
"Constantemente Mía" (Il Volo featuring Belinda)	2013	
"Translation" (Vein featuring Belinda and J Balvin)	2014	Joan Pabon

=== Promotional videos ===
Title	Year	Director(s)
"Sé Diferente"	2003	
"Amigas Cheetahs" (The Cheetah Girls featuring Belinda) (Movie scene)	2006	Kenny Ortega
"Rodolfo El Reno De La Nariz Roja"	2006	
"Bella Traición" (Alternative version)	2007	Televisa Co.
"Debo Saber"	2007	Mattel Co.
"Somos El Mundo" (with Various artists)	2010	
"Ay Haití" (with Various artists)	2010	Borja Crespo
"Que Cante la Vida" (with Various artists)	2010	Alberto Plaza
"Contigo En La Distancia"	2010	Chava Cartas / Pedro Torres

=== Cameo appearances ===
Title	Year	Director(s)
"Navidad de las Estrellas" (Various artists)	2000	Televisa Co.
"Armada Latina" (Cypress Hill)	2010	Matt Alonzo

== See also ==
- List of songs recorded by Belinda
