= Fiesta en la Azotea: En Vivo Desde el Auditorio Nacional =

Fiesta en la Azotea

Video by Belinda
- Released: February 15, 2005
- Recorded: 2004
- Genre: Pop rock
- Languages: Spanish, English
- Labels: Sony BMG, RCA Records
- Producer: Nacho Peregrín

Fiesta en la Azotea: En Vivo Desde El Auditorio Nacional (English: Party on the Roof: Live From the National Auditorium) is a live DVD performance by recording artist Belinda. It was recorded at El Auditorio Nacional in Mexico City. The DVD features a full-length concert in which she performs her greatest hits like "Lo Siento" and "Ángel", as well as past hits from novelas like "¡Amigos X Siempre!", "Aventuras En El Tiempo" and "Cómplices Al Rescate", as well as footage of her celebrating her fifteenth birthday, an important rite of passage in Mexican culture.

== Track listings ==
No.	Title	Length
1.	"Niña De Ayer"
2.	"Superstar"
3.	"Vivir"
4.	"Sin Dolor"
5.	"No entiendo"
6.	"Lazos"
7.	"Aventuras en el tiempo"
8.	"Lo puedo lograr"
9.	"Amigos x siempre"
10.	"El baile del sapito"
11.	"Boba niña nice"
12.	"De niña a mujer"
13.	"Cómplices al rescate"
14.	"Ángel"
15.	"¿Dónde iré yo?"
16.	"Be Free"
17.	"Lo Siento"

=== Music videos (Bonus) ===
No.	Title	Length
1.	"Ángel"
2.	"Lo siento"
3.	"Boba niña nice"
4.	"Be Free"
5.	"Vivir"
6.	"Detrás de cámaras del video "Ángel""

=== Karaoke (Bonus) ===
No.	Title	Length
1.	"Ángel"
2.	"Be free"
3.	"Lo siento"
4.	"Boba niña nice"
5.	"Vivir"

- Includes a behind-the-scenes look at the tour, concert, and her fifteenth birthday in 2004.

== Certification ==
Region	Certification	Certified units/sales
Mexico (AMPROFON)	Platinum+Gold	30,000^{^}
^{^} Shipments figures based on certification alone.
