= Total (Belinda Peregrín album) =

Greatest hits album by Belinda
- Released: November 14, 2006 (Mexico)
- Recorded: 2000–2005
- Genre: Pop; Latin pop; pop rock; cumbia
- Length: 1:00:42
- Language: Spanish; English
- Label: Sony BMG

Belinda chronology
Belinda (2003)	Total (2006)	Utopía (2006)

Professional ratings
Review scores
Source	Rating
AllMusic	3.5/5 stars

Total is the first greatest hits album by Mexican singer Belinda.

== Album information ==
The compilation includes songs from her soap operas, such as "¡Amigos X Siempre!", "Aventuras En El Tiempo" and "Cómplices Al Rescate". It is known that Belinda was not involved in the releasing of this compilation as the song "Alcanzar La Libertad" is a version not made by her.

== Track listing ==
Total
No.	Title	Length
1.	"¡Amigos X Siempre!"	3:15
2.	"Alcanzar La Libertad"	3:34
3.	"Mi Ángel De Amor"	2:23
4.	"Todo Puede Suceder"	3:45
5.	"Cómplices Al Rescate (Popurri Pop y Grupera)"	3:25
6.	"Superstar"	3:18
7.	"El Baile Del Sapito"	3:02
8.	"Lazos"	3:43
9.	"Sácame A Bailar"	3:34
10.	"Al Rescate ¡Ya!"	3:19
11.	"Aventuras En El Tiempo"	2:40
12.	"De Niña A Mujer"	3:31
13.	"Lo Siento (I'm Sorry)"	3:30
14.	"Boba Niña Nice (Teenage Superstar)"	3:02
15.	"Ángel (Once In Your Lifetime)"	3:42
16.	"Vivir (Any Better)"	3:04
17.	"Be Free"	3:35
18.	"Muriendo Lento" (featuring Moderatto y Belinda)	4:12
Total length:		60:34

Total (Edición Especial en DVD) track listing
No.	Title	Length
1.	"Lo Siento (I'm Sorry)"
2.	"Boba Niña Nice (Teenage Superstar)"
3.	"Ángel (Once In Your Lifetime)"
4.	"Vivir (Any Better)"
5.	"Be Free"
6.	"Muriendo Lento" (featuring Moderatto y Belinda)
