= La Voz Argentina season 3 =

La Voz Argentina
- Season 3
- Hosted by: Marley; Stefi Roitman (Digital host)
- Coaches: Ricardo Montaner; Soledad Pastorutti; Mau y Ricky; Lali Espósito; Emilia Mernes (Comeback Stage)
- Winner: Francisco Benitez
- Runner-up: Luz Gaggi

Release
- Original network: Telefe
- Original release: 24 June – 5 September 2021

Season chronology
- ← Previous; Season 2 Next → Season 4

The third season of La Voz Argentina premiered on 24 June 2021, on Telefe. Marley reprised his role as the host of the show, while actress Stefi Roitman became the digital host.

Soledad Pastorutti and Ricardo Montaner returned as coaches (third and second seasons respectively). Duo Mau y Ricky and Lali became new coaches for this season. For the first time in its history, the show featured a fifth coach, Emilia Mernes, who selected contestants to participate in The Comeback Stage, a digital companion series where artists eliminated from the Blind Auditions and coached by Mernes pitted in a series of Battles for a place in the Live Shows.

On 5 September, Francisco Benitez was named winner of the season, marking Soledad Pastorutti's second win as a coach.

== Coaches and presenters ==
Season 3 coaches

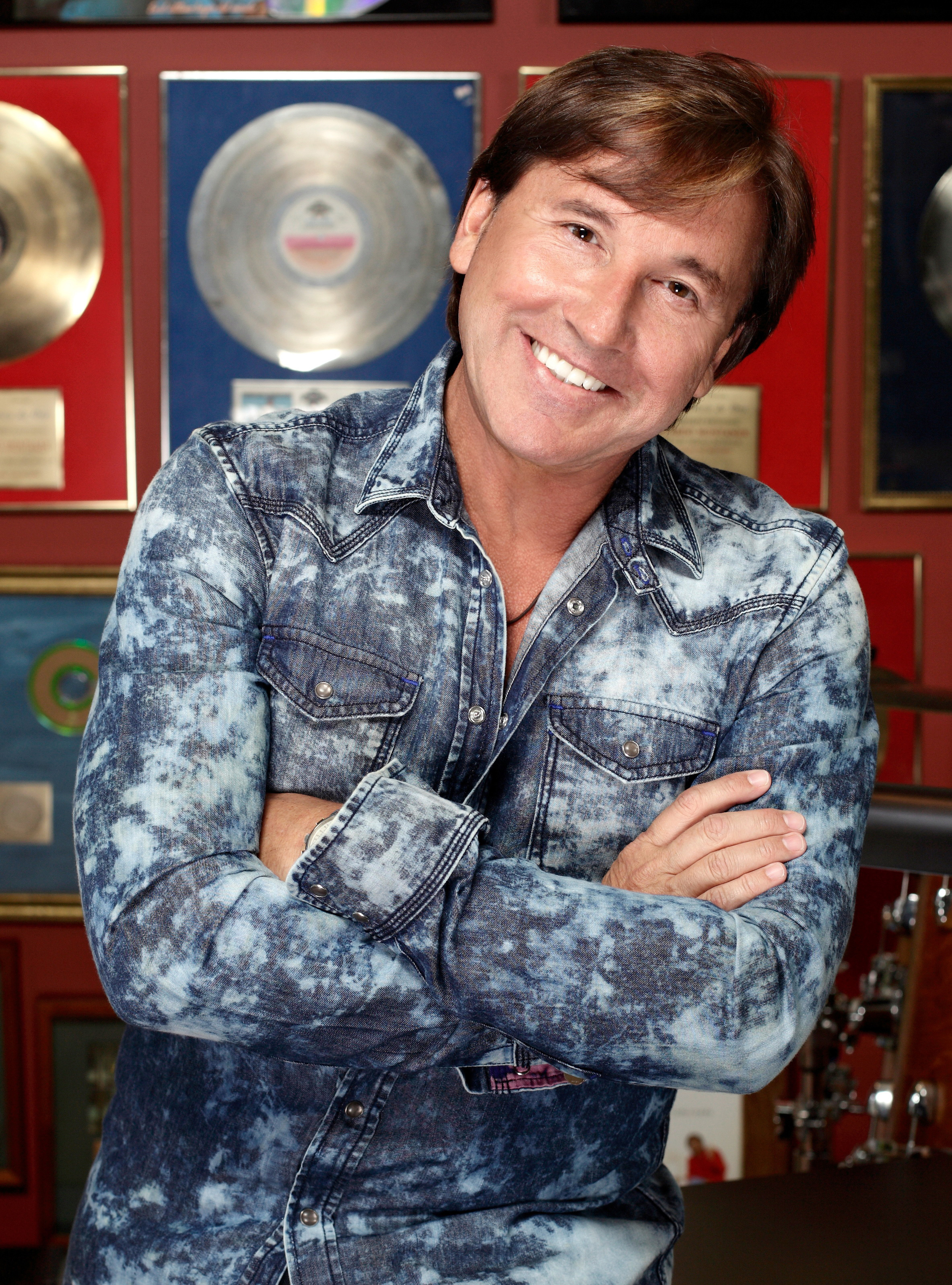
Montaner

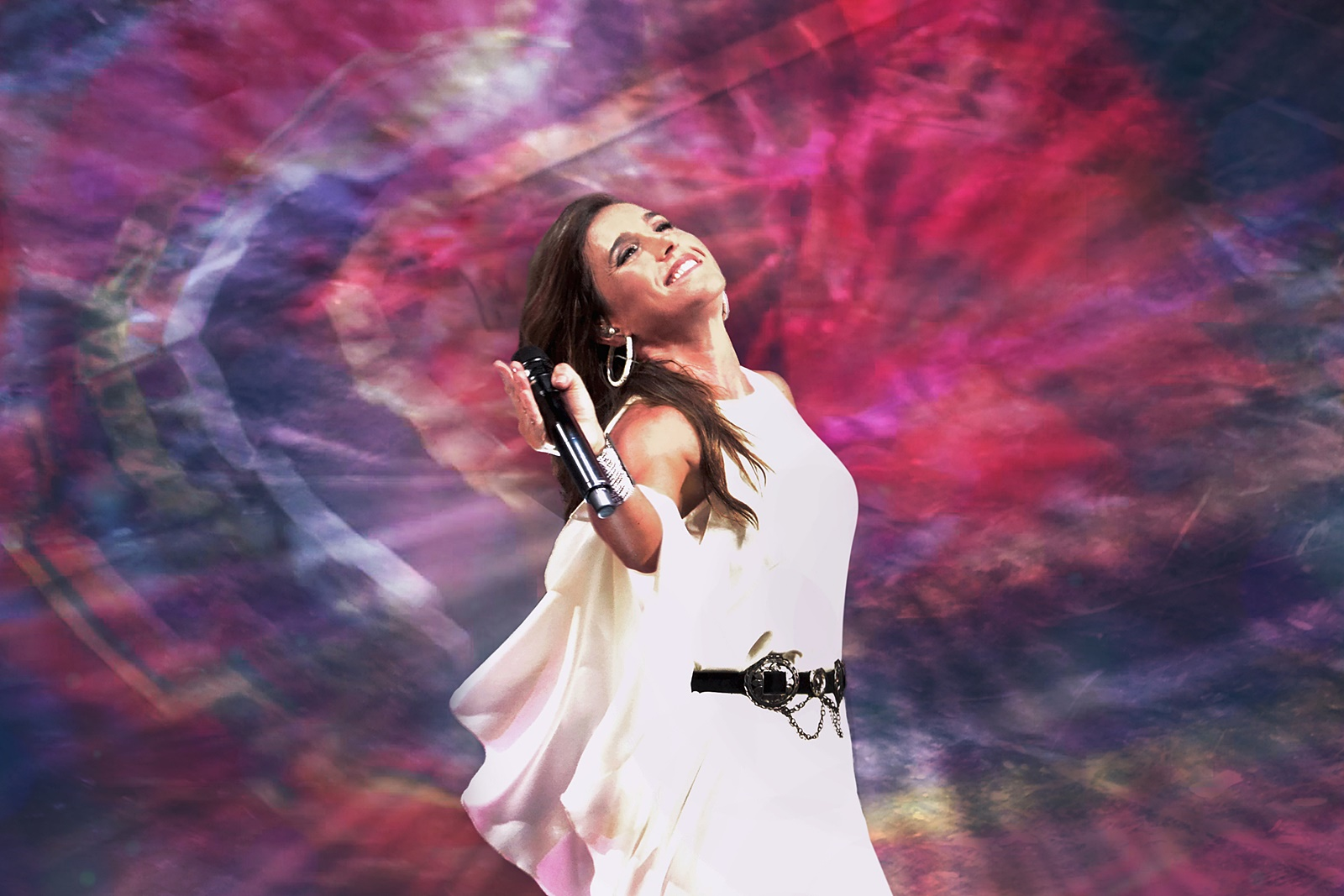
Soledad Pastorutti

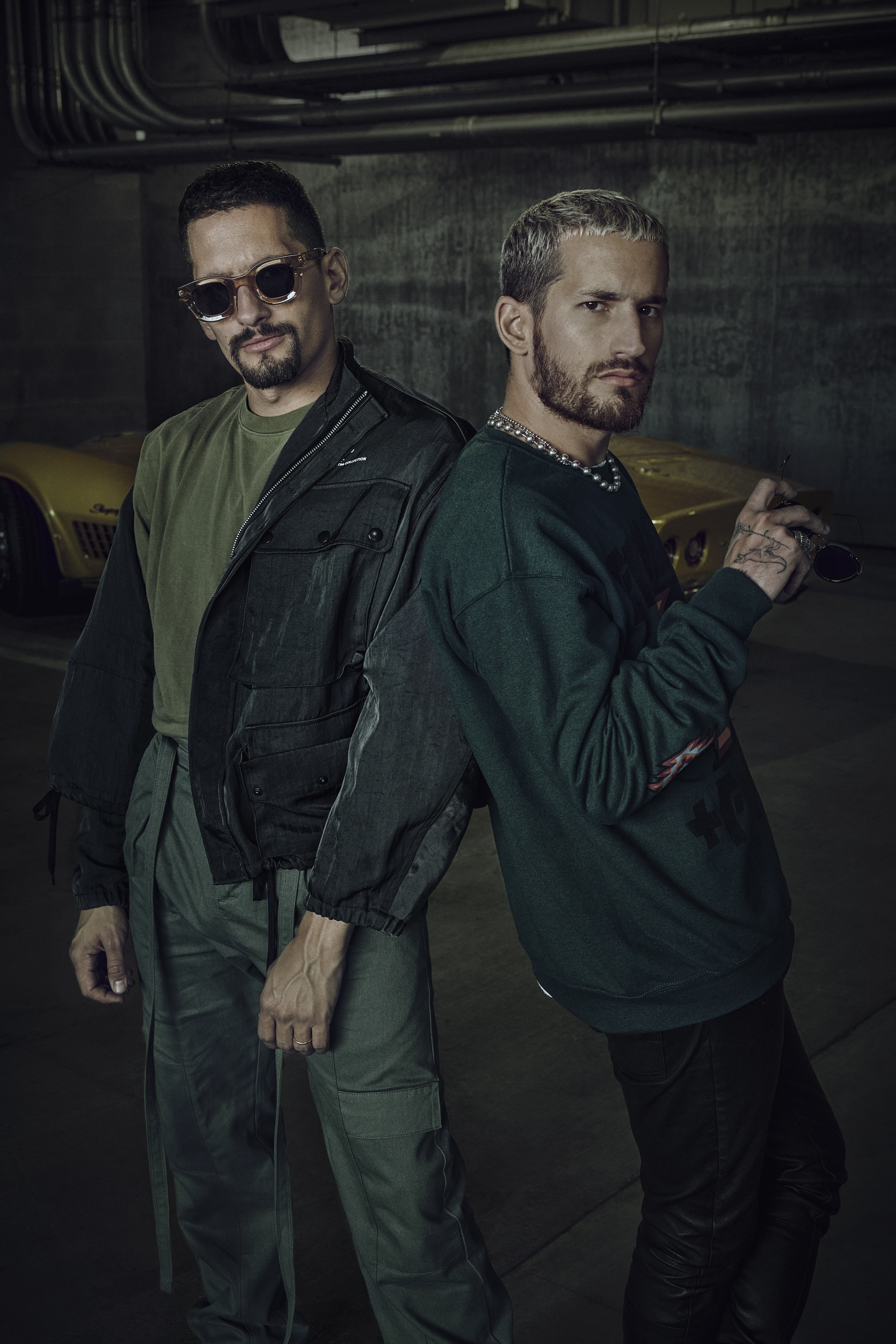
Mau y Ricky

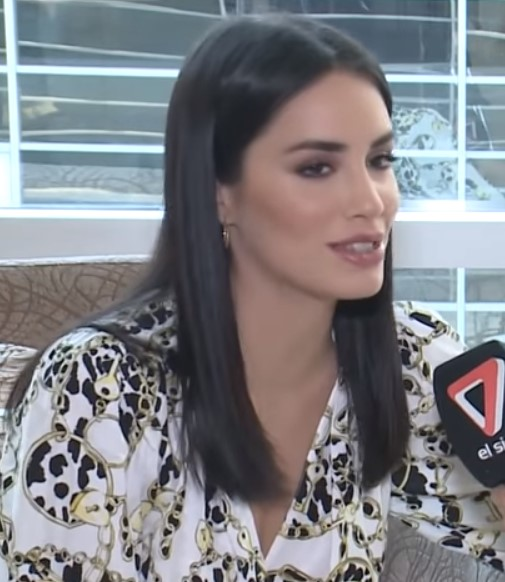
Lali

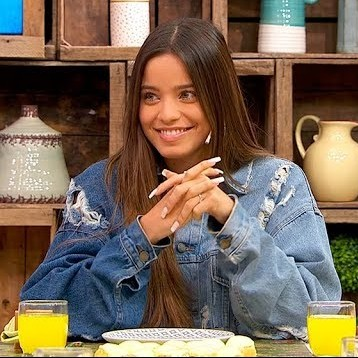
Emilia Mernes

As in the previous season, Marley became the host of the show. This season introduced actress Stefi Roitman as the digital host of the show. Returning coaches from the previous season were Venezuelan-Argentine singer and songwriter Ricardo Montaner and folk singer Soledad Pastorutti. New coaches were confirmed to be pop singer Lali and Venezuelan Latin pop and reggaeton duo Mau y Ricky. New this season, a fifth coach in charge of "The Comeback Stage" was announced. It was later revealed to be Emilia Mernes.

== Teams ==
Main Competition

- Winner
- Runner-up
- Third place
- Fourth place
- Eliminated in the Live shows
- Eliminated in the playoffs
- Eliminated but selected to participate in The Comeback Stage
- Stolen in the Knockouts
- Eliminated in the Knockouts
- Stolen in the Battles
- Eliminated in the Battles
- Withdrew due to COVID-19

The Comeback Stage

- Joined another team
- Eliminated in the Finals
- Eliminated in the Knockouts
- Eliminated in the Second battles
- Eliminated in the First battles

Coaches	Top 106 artists			
Ricardo Montaner				
Ricardo Montaner	Ezequiel Pedraza	Ignacio Sagalá	Denis & Axel Ortiz	Steffanía Útaro
Ricardo Montaner	Jacinta Sandoval	Bianca Cherutti	Sergio Verón	Ana Paula Rodríguez
Ricardo Montaner	Sebastián Pérez	Jessica Amicucci	Gabriel & Gonzalo Moyano	Camila Pereyra
Ricardo Montaner	Pilar Suárez	Pilar Franzotti	Agustina Abregú	Tomás Barrientos
Ricardo Montaner	~~Victoria May~~	~~Luciana Irigoyen~~	Agustina Vita	Santiago Manrique
Ricardo Montaner	Nahuel Racca	Magalí Aciar	Mauro Paez	Mariano Bustos
Ricardo Montaner	Candelaria Zeballos	Sabrina Leira Toriani	Juan Portella	Romina Barros
Soledad Pastorutti				
Soledad Pastorutti	Francisco Benitez	Luna Suárez	Alex Freidig	Patricio Mai
Soledad Pastorutti	Emanuel Rivero	Santiago Costas	Guido Encinas	Victoria May
Soledad Pastorutti	~~Josefina Arenas~~	~~Johana Vera~~	~~Lautaro Cabrera~~	Alexis & Fabrizio Albarracín
Soledad Pastorutti	Luciana Irigoyen	Daniel & Leonardo Vilchez	Marcos Franchi	~~Lucas Oviedo~~
Soledad Pastorutti	~~Alejandra Palazzo~~	~~Magdalena Cullen~~	Germán Giordano	Oscar Rojas
Soledad Pastorutti	Esteban Salvatore	Victoria Rengel	Gonzalo & Agustín	Daiana Urban
Soledad Pastorutti	Pablo Araujo	Julio Fernández	Celena Díaz Roldán	
Mau y Ricky				
Mau y Ricky	Luz Gaggi	Magdalena Cullen	Marcos Olaguibet	Lautaro Cabrera
Mau y Ricky	Camila Garay	Facundo Giovos	Melanie Vargas	Solange López
Mau y Ricky	~~Bianca Cherutti~~	~~Esperanza Careri~~	~~Victoria May~~	Pablo Santillán
Mau y Ricky	Octavio Ramírez	Evangelina Scalise	Tomás Peñaloza	~~Nicolás Olmedo~~
Mau y Ricky	~~Fabrizio & Alexis Albarracín~~	~~Ezequiel Pedraza~~	~~Jessica Amicucci~~	~~Margarita López~~
Mau y Ricky	Nandy Milano	Morena Greppi	Julian Esion	Jassiel Colmenares
Mau y Ricky	Virginia Cozzi	Luis María Campos	Matías Gómez	
Lali Espósito				
Lali Espósito	Nicolás Olmedo	Paula Chouhy	Santiago Borda	Margarita López
Lali Espósito	Azul Masjuan	Esperanza Careri	Franco Leiva	Franco Maceroni
Lali Espósito	Eugenia Celli	Eduardo Morón	Hernán Lemos	Camila Depietro
Lali Espósito	Mora Saleh	Querubín Ayarde	Amal San Yar	~~Gustavo Tacchi~~
Lali Espósito	~~Fernanda Romero~~	Sol Llobet	Ayelén & Rocío Sosa	Federico Ratto
Lali Espósito	Antonella Domínguez	Pablo Gravina	Santiago Fiuri	Milagros Sendot
Lali Espósito	Julieta Herrera González	Abigail Ledesma	Hugo Ruiz	
Emilia Mernes (Comeback Stage)				
Emilia Mernes (Comeback Stage)	~~Ignacio Sagalá~~	Fernanda Romero	Gustavo Tacchi	María Belén Abba
Emilia Mernes (Comeback Stage)	Lucas Oviedo	Johana Vera	Josefina Arenas	Maximiliano Zarza
Emilia Mernes (Comeback Stage)	Luis Carrasco	Alejandra Palazzo	Sol Lucena	Jaqueline Boghossian
Emilia Mernes (Comeback Stage)	Bárbara Bonelli	Julieta García & Melissa de Miguel	Andrés Cantos	Emma Lusicich
Note: Italicized names are stolen artists (names struck through within former teams). The underlined name is "The Comeback Stage" winner, who joined another team of their choice.

== Blind auditions ==
Blind auditions color key
✔	Coach hit his/her "QUIERO TU VOZ" button
	Artist defaulted to this coach's team
	Artist elected to join this coach's team
	Artist was eliminated, but got a second chance to compete in "The Comeback Stage"
	Artist was eliminated and was not invited back for "The Comeback Stage"

Blind auditions results
Episode	Order	Artist	Age	Hometown	Song	Coach's and artist's choices			
Episode	Order	Artist	Age	Hometown	Song	Montaner	Soledad	Mau y Ricky	Lali
Episode 1 (Thursday, 24 June 2021)
Episode 1 (Thursday, 24 June 2021)	1	Alex Freidig	29	Huanguelén, Buenos Aires	"Rayando el sol"	✔	✔	✔	✔
Episode 1 (Thursday, 24 June 2021)	2	Sol Llobet	24	Bariloche, Río Negro	"When We Were Young"	✔	✔	✔	✔
Episode 1 (Thursday, 24 June 2021)	3	Joaquín Rey	21	Ushuaia, Tierra del Fuego	"Tu amor"	—	—	—	—
Episode 1 (Thursday, 24 June 2021)	4	Natalia Lara	24	Resistencia, Chaco	"Brindis"	✔	✔	—	—
Episode 1 (Thursday, 24 June 2021)	5	Luz Gaggi	18	La Plata, Buenos Aires	"One and Only"	✔	—	✔	—
Episode 1 (Thursday, 24 June 2021)	6	Kamala Martinez	24	CABA, Buenos Aires	"Di mi nombre"	—	—	—	—
Episode 1 (Thursday, 24 June 2021)	7	Santiago Borda	19	Concordia, Entre Ríos	"Cien años"	✔	—	✔	✔
Episode 2 (Sunday, 27 June)
Episode 2 (Sunday, 27 June)	1	Esperanza Careri	21	San Martín, Mendoza	"Feeling Good"	✔	✔	✔	✔
Episode 2 (Sunday, 27 June)	2	María Delia Elissetche	51	Lanús, Buenos Aires	"Nostalgias"	—	—	—	—
Episode 2 (Sunday, 27 June)	3	Amal San Yar	35	Villa Celina, Buenos Aires	"Zamba para olvidar"	—	—	—	✔
Episode 2 (Sunday, 27 June)	4	Marcos Misculín	30	Bahía Blanca, Buenos Aires	"It's Not Unusual"	—	—	—	—
Episode 2 (Sunday, 27 June)	5	Francisco Benitez	22	Colonia Tirolesa, Córdoba	"Todo cambia"	✔	✔	✔	✔
Episode 2 (Sunday, 27 June)	6	Catalina Jasienovicz	28	Zárate, Buenos Aires	"Million Reasons"	—	—	—	—
Episode 2 (Sunday, 27 June)	7	Maximiliano Pachecoy	39	Resistencia, Chaco	"Nada es para siempre"	—	—	—	—
Episode 2 (Sunday, 27 June)	8	Jacinta Sandoval	29	Zárate, Buenos Aires	"Stand by Me"	✔	—	—	✔
Episode 3 (Monday, 28 June)
Episode 3 (Monday, 28 June)	1	Lautaro Cabrebra	24	Victoria, Buenos Aires	"Barro tal vez"	✔	✔	✔	✔
Episode 3 (Monday, 28 June)	2	Agustina Vita	35	San Miguel de Tucumán, Tucumán	"A la abuela Emilia"	✔	—	—	—
Episode 3 (Monday, 28 June)	3	Brian De Paula	N/A	Las Heras, Mendoza	"Vuélveme a querer"	—	—	—	—
Episode 3 (Monday, 28 June)	4	Mora Saleh	20	Olivos, Buenos Aires	"Me & Mr Jones"	✔	—	—	✔
Episode 3 (Monday, 28 June)	5	Ignacio Sagalá	19	Córdoba, Córdoba	"Los sonidos del silencio"	—	—	—	—
Episode 4 (Tuesday, 29 June)
Episode 4 (Tuesday, 29 June)	1	Gustavo Tacchi	41	Rufino, Santa Fe	"Moscato, pizza y fainá"	—	✔	—	✔
Episode 4 (Tuesday, 29 June)	2	Pablo Araujo	30	La Providencia, Santiago del Estero	"Sin lágrimas"	—	✔	—	—
Episode 4 (Tuesday, 29 June)	3	Lihuén Rayén	27	Luján de Cuyo, Mendoza	"Turn Me On"	—	—	—	—
Episode 4 (Tuesday, 29 June)	4	Gonzalo & Agustín	34 & 29	Cnel Bogado, Santa Fe	"Procuro olvidarte"	—	✔	✔	—
Episode 4 (Tuesday, 29 June)	5	Marcos Olaguibet	27	San Martín, Mendoza	"Don't Look Back in Anger"	—	✔	✔	✔
Episode 4 (Tuesday, 29 June)	6	Giuliana Ramos	28	Rosario, Santa Fe	"Boomerang"	—	—	—	—
Episode 5 (Wednesday, 30 June)
Episode 5 (Wednesday, 30 June)	1	Guido Encinas	19	Corrientes, Corrientes	"Desde que tú te has ido"	—	✔	—	✔
Episode 5 (Wednesday, 30 June)	2	Ailén Mercado	18	La Paternal, Buenos Aires	"Talking to the Moon"	—	—	—	—
Episode 5 (Wednesday, 30 June)	3	Victoria May	18	CABA, Buenos Aires	"Warrior"	✔	✔	✔	✔
Episode 5 (Wednesday, 30 June)	4	Enzo Flores	23	San Juan, San Juan	"Motivos"	—	—	—	—
Episode 5 (Wednesday, 30 June)	5	Emma Lusicich	32	La Rioja, La Rioja	"Te quiero, te quiero"	—	—	—	—
Episode 5 (Wednesday, 30 June)	6	Pablo Santillán	32	Moreno, Buenos Aires	"Tanto amor"	✔	✔	✔	—
Episode 6 (Thursday, 1 July)
Episode 6 (Thursday, 1 July)	1	Franco Maceroni	18	La Plata, Buenos Aires	"18"	✔	✔	✔	✔
Episode 6 (Thursday, 1 July)	2	Jassiel Colmenares	20	CABA, Buenos Aires	"Mi gente"	✔	—	✔	—
Episode 6 (Thursday, 1 July)	3	Emiliano Gonzalez	38	Rosario, Santa Fe	"Seven Nation Army"	—	—	—	—
Episode 6 (Thursday, 1 July)	4	Sergio Verón	35	Loma Hermosa, Buenos Aires	"Volver, volver"	✔	—	—	—
Episode 6 (Thursday, 1 July)	5	Lucía Cueto	22	Córdoba, Córdoba	"Toxic"	—	—	—	—
Episode 6 (Thursday, 1 July)	6	Daniel & Leonardo Vilchez	34	San Martín, Mendoza	"Sin miedo"	✔	✔	✔	✔
Episode 7 (Sunday, 4 July)
Episode 7 (Sunday, 4 July)	1	Santiago Costas	19	Sgo del Estero, Sgo del Estero	"Mujer, niña y amiga"	✔	✔	—	✔
Episode 7 (Sunday, 4 July)	2	Camila Matarazzo	20	Villa Ballester, Buenos Aires	"The Climb"	—	—	—	—
Episode 7 (Sunday, 4 July)	3	Gabriel & Gonzalo Moyano	23 & 24	Berazategui, Buenos Aires	"Chaqueñamente"	✔	—	—	—
Episode 7 (Sunday, 4 July)	4	Marisa Babincak	36	Núñez, Buenos Aires	"Corazón mentiroso"	—	—	—	—
Episode 7 (Sunday, 4 July)	5	Bianca Cherutti	25	CABA, Buenos Aires	"Hot Stuff"	—	—	✔	✔
Episode 7 (Sunday, 4 July)	6	Luis Carrasco	31	Villa Regina, Río Negro	"Alfonsina y el mar"	—	—	—	—
Episode 7 (Sunday, 4 July)	7	Paula Chouhy	31	San Fernando, Buenos Aires	"If I Were a Boy"	✔	—	—	✔
Episode 8 (Monday, 5 July)
Episode 8 (Monday, 5 July)	1	Joaquín Molina	N/A	Rufino, Santa Fe	"Carpa de Salta"	—	—	—	—
Episode 8 (Monday, 5 July)	2	Margarita López	20	Ramos Mejía, Buenos Aires	"Mercy"	✔	—	✔	—
Episode 8 (Monday, 5 July)	3	Antonella Domínguez	20	Neuquén, Neuquén	"Amor completo"	—	✔	—	✔
Episode 8 (Monday, 5 July)	4	Roger Marcelo Palacios	30	Villa San Isidro, Córdoba	"Me niego"	—	—	—	—
Episode 8 (Monday, 5 July)	5	Luciana Irigoyen	28	Río Cuarto, Córdoba	"Marinero de luces"	✔	—	✔	—
Episode 8 (Monday, 5 July)	6	Nicolás Olmedo	24	Apóstoles, Misiones	"Hallelujah"	✔	✔	✔	✔
Episode 9 (Wednesday, 7 July)
Episode 9 (Wednesday, 7 July)	1	Victoria Abril Molina	N/A	Fuerte Apache, Buenos Aires	"I'll Never Love Again"	—	—	—	—
Episode 9 (Wednesday, 7 July)	2	Virginia Cozzi	26	San Lorenzo, Santa Fe	"22"	✔	—	✔	—
Episode 9 (Wednesday, 7 July)	3	Julio Fernández	49	Mar del Plata, Buenos Aires	"It's a Heartache"	—	✔	✔	—
Episode 9 (Wednesday, 7 July)	4	Paola Godoy	43	Paraná, Entre Ríos	"Sabor a mí"	—	—	—	—
Episode 9 (Wednesday, 7 July)	5	Franco Leiva	28	Bella Vista, Corrientes	"Is This Love"	—	—	—	✔
Episode 9 (Wednesday, 7 July)	6	Jaqueline Boghossian	34	Plaza Italia, Buenos Aires	"Dos gardenias"	—	—	—	—
Episode 9 (Wednesday, 7 July)	7	Celena Díaz Roldán	20	Sgo del Estero, Sgo del Estero	"No me arrepiento de este amor"	—	✔	—	—
Episode 10 (Thursday, 8 July)
Episode 10 (Thursday, 8 July)	1	Agostina Anbez	20	Berazategui, Buenos Aires	"Sin vergüenza"	—	—	—	—
Episode 10 (Thursday, 8 July)	2	Azul Masjuan	20	Tigre, Buenos Aires	"How Far I'll Go"	—	✔	—	✔
Episode 10 (Thursday, 8 July)	3	Steban Ghorghor	33	Rosario, Santa Fe	"Always on My Mind"	—	—	—	—
Episode 10 (Thursday, 8 July)	4	Denis & Axel Ortiz	22 & 27	Villa Yacanto, Córdoba	"Sabor a mí"	✔	✔	✔	✔
Episode 10 (Thursday, 8 July)	5	Candela Lucero	20	Córdoba, Córdoba	"Rosas"	—	—	—	—
Episode 10 (Thursday, 8 July)	6	Luna Suárez	20	Morón, Buenos Aires	"Ain't No Sunshine"	✔	✔	✔	—
Episode 10 (Thursday, 8 July)	7	Camila Nievas	23	Santo Tomé, Santa Fe	"Tu falta de querer"	—	—	—	—
Episode 11 (Friday, 9 July)
Episode 11 (Friday, 9 July)	1	Guillermo Benitez	32	San Francisco, Córdoba	"La noche sin ti"	—	—	—	—
Episode 11 (Friday, 9 July)	2	Magalí Aciar	23	San Juan	"Hasta la raíz"	✔	✔	✔	—
Episode 11 (Friday, 9 July)	3	Luca Lattanzi	28	Cruz Alta, Córdoba	"Radioactive"	—	—	—	—
Episode 11 (Friday, 9 July)	4	Abigail Ledesma	26	La Matanza, Buenos Aires	"One Night Only"	✔	✔	—	✔
Episode 11 (Friday, 9 July)	5	Rosario Voglino	23	Bariloche, Río Negro	"Buenos Aires"	—	—	—	—
Episode 11 (Friday, 9 July)	6	Alex Romero	27	La Carlota, Córdoba	"Aprendiz"	—	—	—	—
Episode 11 (Friday, 9 July)	7	Marcos Franchi	29	Concordia, Entre Ríos	"Footloose"	—	✔	—	—
Episode 12 (Sunday, 11 July)
Episode 12 (Sunday, 11 July)	1	Magdalena Cullen	20	GBA, Buenos Aires	"La noche sin ti"	—	✔	—	—
Episode 12 (Sunday, 11 July)	2	Matías Gomez	33	Corrientes, Corrientes	"Cuando acaba el placer"	—	✔	✔	✔
Episode 12 (Sunday, 11 July)	3	Franco Bacchiani	31	Martínez, Buenos Aires	"Bello abril"	—	—	—	—
Episode 12 (Sunday, 11 July)	4	Federico Ratto	27	Chivilcoy, Buenos Aires	"Tratáme suavemente"	—	—	—	✔
Episode 12 (Sunday, 11 July)	5	Camila Garay	21	Las Heras, Santa Cruz	"Como la Flor"	✔	✔	✔	✔
Episode 12 (Sunday, 11 July)	6	Morena Feit	22	San Isidro, Buenos Aires	"If I Ain't Got You"	—	—	—	—
Episode 12 (Sunday, 11 July)	7	Mauro Páez	26	General Alvear, Mendoza	"Lo saben mis zapatos"	✔	✔	—	—
Episode 12 (Sunday, 11 July)	8	Andrés Cantos	23	Rivadavia, San Juan	"Estrella fugaz"	—	—	—	—
Episode 13 (Monday, 12 July)
Episode 13 (Monday, 12 July)	1	Ezequiel Pedraza	26	Río Cuarto, Córdoba	"Ráfaga de amor"	—	✔	✔	✔
Episode 13 (Monday, 12 July)	2	Sol Lucena	20	GBA, Buenos Aires	"I Want to Break Free"	—	—	—	—
Episode 13 (Monday, 12 July)	3	Milagros Sendot	26	GBA, Buenos Aires	"Golden Slumbers"	✔	—	—	✔
Episode 13 (Monday, 12 July)	4	Victoria Rengel	24	CABA, Buenos Aires	"Los amores con las crisis"	—	✔	—	✔
Episode 13 (Monday, 12 July)	5	Mariano Bustos	29	Córdoba, Córdoba	"Si tú no estás aqui"	✔	—	—	—
Episode 13 (Monday, 12 July)	6	Federico Ariel di María	28	San Lorenzo, Santa Fe	"Mystify"	—	—	—	—
Episode 13 (Monday, 12 July)	7	Jimena Sans	25	Capitán Sarmiento, Buenos Aires	"Chacarera de un triste"	—	—	—	—
Episode 14 (Tuesday, 13 July)
Episode 14 (Tuesday, 13 July)	1	Germán Giordano	47	Mataderos, Buenos Aires	"Piedra y camino"	✔	✔	—	—
Episode 14 (Tuesday, 13 July)	2	Mariela Oriolo	27	Lomas de Zamora, Buenos Aires	"Si el amor se cae"	—	—	—	—
Episode 14 (Tuesday, 13 July)	3	Milagros Sendot	26	Córdoba, Córdoba	"I Have Nothing"	✔	✔	✔	✔
Episode 14 (Tuesday, 13 July)	4	Agustina Abregú	20	Quilmes, Buenos Aires	"Creo en mí"	✔	—	—	—
Episode 14 (Tuesday, 13 July)	5	Julián Esion	23	Versalles, Buenos Aires	"Yellow"	✔	—	✔	—
Episode 14 (Tuesday, 13 July)	6	Luis Boccia	37	Guaymallén, Mendoza	"Toro y luna"	—	—	—	—
Episode 14 (Tuesday, 13 July)	7	Maximiliano Zanettini	23	Chivilcoy, Buenos Aires	"That's All Right"	—	—	—	—
Episode 15 (Wednesday, 14 July)
Episode 15 (Wednesday, 14 July)	1	Pilar Suárez	22	Palermo, Buenos Aires	"You Shook Me All Night Long"	✔	—	—	✔
Episode 15 (Wednesday, 14 July)	2	Josefina Arenas	21	Tandil, Buenos Aires	"Pa callar tus penas"	—	✔	—	—
Episode 15 (Wednesday, 14 July)	3	Gonzalo De Zabaleta	25	Ramallo, Buenos Aires	"For Once in My Life"	—	—	—	—
Episode 15 (Wednesday, 14 July)	4	Sebastián Pérez	29	Godoy Cruz, Mendoza	"Heaven"	✔	—	—	—
Episode 15 (Wednesday, 14 July)	5	Hernán Lemos	24	Yerba Buena, Tucumán	"Vuelveme a querer"	—	—	✔	✔
Episode 15 (Wednesday, 14 July)	6	Camila Hecker	24	Santa Rosa, La Pampa	"All I Ask"	—	—	—	—
Episode 15 (Wednesday, 14 July)	7	Fiorella Gamarra	36	Avellaneda, Buenos Aires	"Nunca Voy a Olvidarte"	—	—	—	—
Episode 16 (Thursday, 15 July)
Episode 16 (Thursday, 15 July)	1	Jessica Amicucci	30	CABA, Buenos Aires	"And I Am Telling You I'm Not Going"	✔	✔	✔	✔
Episode 16 (Thursday, 15 July)	2	Julieta Herrera González	25	Córdoba, Córdoba	"Take Me to Church"	—	—	—	✔
Episode 16 (Thursday, 15 July)	3	Leandro Pérez	33	Mendoza, Mendoza	"Rock and roll y fiebre"	—	—	—	—
Episode 16 (Thursday, 15 July)	4	Nahuel Racca	20	Godoy Cruz, Mendoza	"Mi princesa"	✔	—	✔	—
Episode 16 (Thursday, 15 July)	5	Santiago Fiuri	21	Villa María, Córdoba	"Hasta la raíz"	—	✔	✔	✔
Episode 16 (Thursday, 15 July)	6	Bianca Bespresvany	20	Tigre, Buenos Aires	"Careless Whisper"	—	—	—	—
Episode 16 (Thursday, 15 July)	7	Lucía & Adrián Rufino	25 & 53	Salta, Salta	"Cuando"	—	—	—	—
Episode 17 (Sunday, 18 July)
Episode 17 (Sunday, 18 July)	1	Tomás Peñaloza	20	CABA, Buenos Aires	"Desconocidos"	—	—	✔	—
Episode 17 (Sunday, 18 July)	2	Fernanda Romero	33	Córdoba, Córdoba	"Zombie"	✔	✔	—	✔
Episode 17 (Sunday, 18 July)	3	Rocío Belzuz	19	Villa Ballester, Buenos Aires	"Happier"	—	—	—	—
Episode 17 (Sunday, 18 July)	4	Santiago Manrique	N/A	Godoy Cruz, Mendoza	"Neon"	✔	✔	✔	—
Episode 17 (Sunday, 18 July)	5	Diego Moriconi	27	Rosario, Santa Fe	"Culpablo o no"	—	—	—	—
Episode 17 (Sunday, 18 July)	6	Oscar Rojas	28	José C. Paz, Buenos Aires	"Mírame"	—	✔	—	—
Episode 17 (Sunday, 18 July)	7	Lucila Alvado	22	Rosario, Santa Fe	"It's All Coming Back to Me Now"	—	—	—	—
Episode 17 (Sunday, 18 July)	8	Julieta García	23	La Plata, Buenos Aires	"Fantasías"	—	—	—	—
Episode 18 (Monday, 19 July)
Episode 18 (Monday, 19 July)	1	Morena Greppi	22	Rosario, Santa Fe	"Lullaby of Birdland"	✔	✔	✔	✔
Episode 18 (Monday, 19 July)	2	Candelaria Zeballos	20	Mendoza, Mendoza	"I Have Nothing"	✔	✔	—	—
Episode 18 (Monday, 19 July)	3	Sofía D'Angelo	19	CABA, Buenos Aires	"Más"	—	—	—	—
Episode 18 (Monday, 19 July)	4	Eduardo Morón	26	Mendoza, Mendoza	"Ando rodando"	—	—	—	✔
Episode 18 (Monday, 19 July)	5	Rubén Andrés Aiassa	51	Colazo, Córdoba	"Caruso"	—	—	—	—
Episode 18 (Monday, 19 July)	6	Daiana Urban	28	Bariloche, Río Negro	"Llueve sobre mojado"	—	✔	—	—
Episode 18 (Monday, 19 July)	7	María Belén Abba	27	Castelar, Buenos Aires	"Almost Is Never Enough"	—	—	—	—
Episode 19 (Tuesday, 20 July)
Episode 19 (Tuesday, 20 July)	1	Querubín Ayarde	31	Salta, Salta	"Uno por uno"	—	—	✔	✔
Episode 19 (Tuesday, 20 July)	2	Chiara & Brunella Neri	20 & 23	Rosario, Santa Fe	"I Say a Little Prayer"	—	—	—	—
Episode 19 (Tuesday, 20 July)	3	Solange López	21	CABA, Buenos Aires	"Más"	✔	✔	✔	✔
Episode 19 (Tuesday, 20 July)	4	Luis María Campos	48	Chivilcoy, Buenos Aires	"Me gusta Jujuy"	—	—	✔	—
Episode 19 (Tuesday, 20 July)	5	Cristian Díaz	35	CABA, Buenos Aires	"Honesty"	—	—	—	—
Episode 19 (Tuesday, 20 July)	6	Esteban Salvatore	48	Neuquén, Neuquén	"Nos veremos otra vez"	—	✔	—	—
Episode 19 (Tuesday, 20 July)	7	Lorena Also	32	San Rafael, Mendoza	"Nunca me faltes"	—	—	—	—
Episode 19 (Tuesday, 20 July)	8	Lucas Zaldívar	33	Rosario, Santa Fe	"It's All Coming Back to Me Now"	—	—	—	—
Episode 20 (Wednesday, 21 July)
Episode 20 (Wednesday, 21 July)	1	Sabrina Leira Toriani	20	San José, Entre Ríos	"Crazy"	✔	—	—	✔
Episode 20 (Wednesday, 21 July)	2	Romina Barros	N/A	San Miguel de Tucumán, Tucumán	"Entre tu amor y mi amor"	✔	✔	—	—
Episode 20 (Wednesday, 21 July)	3	Julieta García & Melissa de Miguel	23	Tres Lomas/Mar del Plata, Buenos Aires	"Lady Marmalade"	—	—	—	—
Episode 20 (Wednesday, 21 July)	4	Patricio Mai	30	Lincoln, Buenos Aires	"Sunday Morning"	—	✔	—	—
Episode 20 (Wednesday, 21 July)	5	Ezequiel Maryllack	34	San Martín, Mendoza	"Todo cambia"	—	—	—	—
Episode 20 (Wednesday, 21 July)	6	Tomás Giménez Aguera	22	Concepción, Tucumán	"Medialuna"	—	—	—	—
Episode 20 (Wednesday, 21 July)	7	Julieta Gullerón	18	GBA, Buenos Aires	"Stone Cold"	—	—	—	—
Episode 21 (Thursday, 22 July)
Episode 21 (Thursday, 22 July)	1	Ayelén & Rocío Sosa	20	Tandil, Buenos Aires	"Inés"	—	—	✔	✔
Episode 21 (Thursday, 22 July)	2	Carla Pensalfine	23	Mendoza, Mendoza	"Smells Like Teen Spirit"	—	—	—	—
Episode 21 (Thursday, 22 July)	3	Emanuel Rivero	33	San Rafael, Mendoza	"Qué me van a hablar de amor"	—	✔	✔	✔
Episode 21 (Thursday, 22 July)	4	Daira Nahir Vargas Álvarez	20	Río Turbio, Santa Cruz	"Hurt"	—	—	—	—
Episode 21 (Thursday, 22 July)	5	Melanie Vargas	26	San Martín, Buenos Aires	"La Llorona"	—	—	✔	—
Episode 21 (Thursday, 22 July)	6	Noelia Soledad Bizzera	33	Firmat, Santa Fe	"Señor amante"	—	—	—	—
Episode 21 (Thursday, 22 July)	7	Romina Bucciarelli	22	Temperley, Buenos Aires	"Overjoyed"	—	—	—	—
Episode 22 (Sunday, 25 July)
Episode 22 (Sunday, 25 July)	1	Alejandra Palazzo	30	Bernal, Buenos Aires	"Thunderstruck"	—	✔	—	—
Episode 22 (Sunday, 25 July)	2	Tomás Barrientos	22	San Gregorio, Santa Fe	"Seminare"	✔	✔	✔	✔
Episode 22 (Sunday, 25 July)	3	Bárbara Bonelli	28	Sáenz Peña, Buenos Aires	"Nothing Compares To You"	—	—	—	—
Episode 22 (Sunday, 25 July)	4	Pablo Gravina	28	Bahía Blanca, Buenos Aires	"Always"	—	—	—	✔
Episode 22 (Sunday, 25 July)	5	Nandy Milano	25	Córdoba, Córdoba	"Disfruto"	✔	✔	✔	—
Episode 22 (Sunday, 25 July)	6	Alexis & Fabrizio Albarracín	19 & 24	Villa Parque Santa Ana, Córdoba	"Tanto"	—	—	✔	—
Episode 22 (Sunday, 25 July)	7	Camila Treverso	23	Merlo, Buenos Aires	"Vas a quedarte"	—	—	—	—
Episode 22 (Sunday, 25 July)	8	Ana Paula Rodríguez	34	Lomas de Zamora, Buenos Aires	"Por qué te vas"	✔	—	—	—
Episode 23 (Monday, 26 July)
Episode 23 (Monday, 26 July)	1	Juan Portella	22	Salta, Salta	"Mil horas"	✔	—	—	✔
Episode 23 (Monday, 26 July)	2	Hugo Ruiz	40	Las Lajitas, Salta	"Tonada de un viejo amor"	—	—	—	✔
Episode 23 (Monday, 26 July)	3	M. Alejandra & M. Elisabeth Pistoni	N/A	Santa Fe, Santa Fe	"Sonsejo de amor"	—	—	—	—
Episode 23 (Monday, 26 July)	4	Octavio Ramírez	20	San Miguel, Buenos Aires	"Prófugos"	—	—	✔	✔
Episode 23 (Monday, 26 July)	5	Steffanía Útaro	24	CABA, Buenos Aires	"(You Make Me Feel Like) A Natural Woman"	✔	✔	—	✔
Episode 23 (Monday, 26 July)	6	Evangelina Scalise	28	San Nicolás, Buenos Aires	"Always Remember Us This Way"	—	—	✔	—
Episode 23 (Monday, 26 July)	7	Alejandro Vergara	33	Mar del Plata, Buenos Aires	"Donde quieras que estés"	—	—	—	—
Episode 23 (Monday, 26 July)	8	Lucas Oviedo	36	Reta, Buenos Aires	"Salta es una mujer"	—	✔	✔	—
Episode 24 (Tuesday, 27 July)
Episode 24 (Tuesday, 27 July)	1	Maximiliano Zarza	35	Rosario, Santa Fe	"Una calle nos separa"	—	—	—	—
Episode 24 (Tuesday, 27 July)	2	Camila Pereyra	18	Olavarría, Buenos Aires	"Amor a primera vista"	✔	✔	✔	✔
Episode 24 (Tuesday, 27 July)	3	Johana Vera	18	Las Lajitas, Salta	"Tocando al frente"	Team full	✔	—	—
Episode 24 (Tuesday, 27 July)	4	María Belén Eichemberger	N/A	San Lorenzo, Santa Fe	"Corazón hambriento"	Team full	Team full	—	—
Episode 24 (Tuesday, 27 July)	5	Camila Depietro	20	Ramos Mejía, Buenos Aires	"Como un guerrero"	Team full	Team full	✔	✔
Episode 24 (Tuesday, 27 July)	6	Facundo Giovos	26	Villa Carlos Paz, Córdoba	"Bachata rosa"	Team full	Team full	✔	Team full

== Battles ==
The battles began on 28 July 2021. The advisors for this round were Nahuel Pennisi for Team Montaner, Miranda! for Team Soledad, Nicki Nicole for Team Mau y Ricky, and Cazzu for Team Lali. In this round, each coach can steal two losing artist from another team. Artists who win their battles or are stolen by another coach advance to the Knockouts.

Battles color key
Artist won the Battle and advanced to the Knockouts
Artist lost the Battle, but was stolen by another coach, and, advanced to the Knockouts
Artist lost the Battle but got a second chance to compete in "The Comeback Stage"
Artist lost the Battle and was eliminated

Battles results
Episode	Order	Coach	Winner	Song	Loser	'Steal' result			
Episode	Order	Coach	Winner	Song	Loser	Montaner	Soledad	Mau y Ricky	Lali
Episode 25 (Wednesday, 29 July)	1	Lali	Santiago Borda	"Ego"	Julieta Herrera González	—	—	—	N/A
Episode 25 (Wednesday, 29 July)	2	Mau y Ricky	Luz Gaggi	"Someone You Loved"	Margarita López	—	—	N/A	✔
Episode 25 (Wednesday, 29 July)	3	Montaner	Denis & Axel Ortiz	"El mar"	Romina Barros	N/A	—	—	—
Episode 25 (Wednesday, 29 July)	4	Soledad	Guido Encinas	"Todos somos pueblo"	Celena Díaz Roldán	—	N/A	—	—
Episode 25 (Wednesday, 29 July)	5	Lali	Paula Chouhy	"Beautiful"	Abigail Ledesma	—	—	—	N/A
Episode 26 (Thursday, 30 July)	1	Mau y Ricky	Camila Garay	"Si me tomo una cerveza"	Matías López	—	—	N/A	—
Episode 26 (Thursday, 30 July)	2	Montaner	Sergio Damián Verón	"La barca"	Luciana Irigoyen	N/A	✔	—	✔
Episode 26 (Thursday, 30 July)	3	Soledad	Marcos Franchi	"Proud Mary"	Julio Fernández	—	N/A	—	—
Episode 26 (Thursday, 30 July)	4	Lali	Hernán Lemos	"Oración del remanso"	Milagros Sendot	—	—	—	N/A
Episode 26 (Thursday, 30 July)	4	Lali	Querubín Ayarde (Note: Originally, Ayarde was going to battle against Hugo Ruiz, who tested positive for COVID-19 and had to withdraw from the competition. Hence, Ayarde was added to the battle between Lemos and Sendot, with two artists winning the battle.)	"Oración del remanso"	Milagros Sendot	—	—	—	N/A
Episode 27 (Sunday, 1 August)	1	Soledad	Emanuel Rivero Famá	"Los cosos de al lao"	Pablo Araujo	—	N/A	—	—
Episode 27 (Sunday, 1 August)	2	Montaner	Jacinta Sandoval	"When I Was Your Man"	Victoria May	N/A	—	✔	—
Episode 27 (Sunday, 1 August)	3	Lali	Camila DePietro	"Asilo"	Santiago Fiuri	—	—	—	N/A
Episode 27 (Sunday, 1 August)	4	Mau y Ricky	Melanie Vargas	"Historia de un Amor"	Luis María Campos	—	—	N/A	—
Episode 27 (Sunday, 1 August)	5	Montaner	Pilar Suárez	"¿Qué vas a hacer?"	Juan Portella	N/A	—	—	—
Episode 28 (Monday, 2 August)	1	Montaner	Steffanía Útaro	"I'm Not the Only One"	Sabrina Leira	N/A	—	—	—
Episode 28 (Monday, 2 August)	2	Lali	Franco Maceroni	"Sign of the Times"	Pablo Gravina	—	—	—	N/A
Episode 28 (Monday, 2 August)	3	Soledad	Francisco Benítez	"Sin principio ni final"	Lucas Oviedo	—	N/A	—	—
Episode 28 (Monday, 2 August)	4	Mau y Ricky	Bianca Cherutti	"Rain on Me"	Virginia Cozzi	—	—	N/A	—
Episode 28 (Monday, 2 August)	5	Soledad	Josefina Arenas	"A cada hombre, a cada mujer"	Daiana Urban	—	N/A	—	—
Episode 29 (Tuesday, 3 August)	1	Soledad	Patricio Mai	"Take On Me"	Victoria Rengel	—	N/A	—	—
Episode 29 (Tuesday, 3 August)	2	Lali	Franco Leiva	"Amiga Mía"	Antonella Domínguez	—	—	—	N/A
Episode 29 (Tuesday, 3 August)	3	Mau y Ricky	Esperanza Careri	"Love On Top"	Jessica Amicucci	✔	—	N/A	—
Episode 29 (Tuesday, 3 August)	4	Montaner	Tomás Barrientos	"Sola otra vez"	Candelaria Zeballos	N/A	—	—	—
Episode 29 (Tuesday, 3 August)	5	Soledad	Daniel & Leonardo Vilchez	"Si no te hubieras ido"	Gonzalo & Agustín	—	N/A	—	—
Episode 30 (Wednesday, 4 August)	1	Mau y Ricky	Tomás Peñaloza	"La Noche de Anoche"	Jassiel Colmenares	—	—	N/A	—
Episode 30 (Wednesday, 4 August)	2	Soledad	Johana Vera	"Zamba de amor en vuelo"	Magdalena Cullen	✔	N/A	✔	—
Episode 30 (Wednesday, 4 August)	3	Lali	Azul Masjuan	"A Sky Full of Stars"	Federico Ratto	—	—	Team full	N/A
Episode 30 (Wednesday, 4 August)	4	Montaner	Gonzalo & Gabriel Moyano	"Mi vida sin tu amor"	Mariano Bustos	N/A	—	Team full	—
Episode 31 (Thursday, 5 August)	1	Soledad	Luna Suárez	"Back to Black"	Alejandra Rama Palazzo	—	N/A	Team full	—
Episode 31 (Thursday, 5 August)	2	Lali	Amal San Yar	"Puro veneno"	Ayelén & Rocío Sosa	—	—	Team full	N/A
Episode 31 (Thursday, 5 August)	3	Mau y Ricky	Facundo Giovos	"Yo No Sé Mañana"	Ezequiel Pedraza	✔	✔	Team full	—
Episode 31 (Thursday, 5 August)	4	Montaner	Ana Paula Rodríguez	"Tan Sólo Tú"	Mauro Páez	Team full	—	Team full	—
Episode 32 (Friday, 6 August)	1	Lali	Eugenia Celli	"Creep"	Sol Llobet	Team full	—	Team lleno	N/A
Episode 32 (Friday, 6 August)	2	Montaner	Camila Pereyra	"Dónde está el Amor"	Magalí Aciar	Team full	—	Team lleno	—
Episode 32 (Friday, 6 August)	3	Soledad	Lautaro Cabrera	"Yo vengo a ofrecer mi corazón"	Esteban Salvatore	Team full	N/A	Team lleno	—
Episode 32 (Friday, 6 August)	4	Mau y Ricky	Marcos Olaguibet	"Use Somebody"	Julián Esión	Team full	—	Team lleno	—
Episode 32 (Friday, 6 August)	5	Montaner	Agustina Abregú	"Por primera vez"	Nahuel Racca	Team full	—	Team lleno	—
Episode 33 (Sunday, 8 August)	1	Mau y Ricky	Pablo Santillán	"Dolería"	Alexis & Fabrizio Albarracín	Team full	✔	Team full	—
Episode 33 (Sunday, 8 August)	2	Soledad	Alex Freidig	"Vuelve"	Oscar Rojas	Team full	Team full	Team full	—
Episode 33 (Sunday, 8 August)	3	Lali	Mora Saleh	"Skyfall"	Fernanda Romero	Team full	Team full	Team full	N/A
Episode 33 (Sunday, 8 August)	4	Mau y Ricky	Evangelina Scalise	"Algo contigo"	Morena Greppi	Team full	Team full	Team full	—
Episode 33 (Sunday, 8 August)	5	Montaner	Sebastián Pérez	"Perfect"	Santiago Manrique	Team full	Team full	Team full	—
Episode 34 Monday, 9 August)	1	Lali	Eduardo Morón	"El témpano"	Gustavo Tacchi	Team full	Team full	Team full	N/A
Episode 34 Monday, 9 August)	2	Soledad	Santiago Costas	"América, América"	Germán Giordano	Team full	Team full	Team full	—
Episode 34 Monday, 9 August)	3	Mau y Ricky	Octavio Ramírez	"Somebody to Love"	Nicolás Olmedo	Team full	Team full	Team full	✔
Episode 34 Monday, 9 August)	4	Montaner	Pilar Franzotti	"Hoy"	Agustina Vita	Team full	Team full	Team full	Team full
Episode 34 Monday, 9 August)	5	Mau y Ricky	Solange López	"It Must Have Been Love"	Nandy Milano	Team full	Team full	Team full	Team full

== Knockouts ==
The knockouts round started on 10 August after the final battles. Each coach could each one losing artist from another team. The top 32 contestants move on to the playoffs.

Knockouts color key
Artist won the Knockout and advanced to the playoffs
Artist lost the Knockout but was stolen by another coach and advanced to the playoffs
Artist lost the Knockout but got a second chance to compete in "The Comeback Stage"
Artist lost the Knockout and was eliminated

Knockouts results
Episode	Order	Coach	Song	Artists		Song	'Steal' result			
Episode	Order	Coach	Song	Winner	Loser	Song	Montaner	Soledad	Mau y Ricky	Lali
Episode 35 (Tuesday, 10 August)	1	Soledad	"Malo"	Luna Suárez	Marcos Franchi	"Que digan lo que quieran"	—	N/A	—	—
Episode 35 (Tuesday, 10 August)	2	Montaner	"Quisiera"	Ezequiel Pedraza	Tomás Barrientos	"Tan enamorados"	N/A	—	—	—
Episode 35 (Tuesday, 10 August)	3	Lali	"Me das cada día más"	Santiago Borda	Amal San Yar	"Los mareados"	—	—	—	N/A
Episode 35 (Tuesday, 10 August)	4	Mau y Ricky	"High and Dry"	Marcos Olaguibet	Victoria May	"Drivers License"	—	✔	N/A	—
Episode 36 (Wednesday, 11 August)	1	Mau y Ricky	"Billie Jean"	Luz Gaggi	Esperanza Careri	"Víveme"	✔	Team full	N/A	✔
Episode 36 (Wednesday, 11 August)	2	Soledad	"Zamba del carnaval"	Alex Freidig	Daniel & Leonardo Vilchez	"Gato del festival"	—	Team full	—	Team full
Episode 36 (Wednesday, 11 August)	3	Lali	"Purple Rain"	Nicolás Olmedo	Querubín Ayarde	"Antología"	—	Team full	—	Team full
Episode 36 (Wednesday, 11 August)	4	Montaner	"La Mejor Versión de Mí"	Ana Paula Rodríguez	Agustina Abregú	"La de la Mala Suerte"	N/A	Team full	—	Team full
Episode 37 (Thursday, 12 August)	1	Soledad	"Against All Odds (Take a Look at Me Now)"	Patricio Mai	Lautaro Cabrera	"En la Ciudad de la Furia"	—	Team full	✔	Team full
Episode 37 (Thursday, 12 August)	2	Lali	"Ayer"	Paula Chouhy	Mora Saleh	"Angels like You"	—	Team full	Team full	Team full
Episode 37 (Thursday, 12 August)	3	Montaner	"Bailar pegados"	Sergio Verón	Pilar Franzotti	"A fuego lento"	N/A	Team full	Team full	Team full
Episode 37 (Thursday, 12 August)	4	Mau y Ricky	"Hawái"	Facundo Giovos	Tomás Peñaloza	"Si me dices que sí"	—	Team full	Team full	Team full
Episode 38 (Friday, 13 August)	1	Mau y Ricky	"Can You Feel the Love Tonight"	Solange López	Evangelina Scalise	"Inevitable"	—	Team full	Team full	Team full
Episode 38 (Friday, 13 August)	2	Lali	"Everything I Wanted"	Margarita López	Camila Depietro	"Genio atrapado"	—	Team full	Team full	Team full
Episode 38 (Friday, 13 August)	3	Montaner	"Lloran Las Rosas"	Sebastián Pérez	Pilar Suárez	"Livin' on a Prayer"	N/A	Team full	Team full	Team full
Episode 38 (Friday, 13 August)	4	Soledad	"Dueño de nada"	Emanuel Rivero	Luciana Irigoyen	"Como Tu Mujer"	—	Team full	Team full	Team full
Episode 39 (Sunday, 15 August)	1	Lali	"Más allá de tus ojos"	Franco Leiva	Hernán Lemos	"Fría Como el Viento"	—	Team full	Team full	Team full
Episode 39 (Sunday, 15 August)	2	Mau y Ricky	"Me va a extrañar"	Camila Garay	Bianca Cherutti	"Dangerous Woman"	✔	Team full	Team full	Team full
Episode 39 (Sunday, 15 August)	3	Soledad	"Te vas"	Guido Encinas	Alexis & Fabrizio Albarracín	"Olvídala"	Team full	Team full	Team full	Team full
Episode 39 (Sunday, 15 August)	4	Montaner	"El amor después del amor"	Steffanía Útaro	Camila Pereyra	"Sea"	Team full	Team full	Team full	Team full
Episode 40 (Monday, 16 August)	1	Lali	"Story of My Life"	Franco Maceroni	Eduardo Morón	"I Don't Want to Miss a Thing"	Team full	Team full	Team full	Team full
Episode 40 (Monday, 16 August)	2	Soledad	"Como te extraño mi amor"	Santiago Costas	Johana Vera	"Que te ruegue quien te quiera"	Team full	Team full	Team full	Team full
Episode 40 (Monday, 16 August)	3	Montaner	"Que me alcance la vida"	Denis & Axel Ortiz	Gabriel & Gonzalo Moyano	"A Puro Dolor"	Team full	Team full	Team full	Team full
Episode 40 (Monday, 16 August)	4	Mau y Ricky	"Volver"	Melanie Vargas	Octavio Ramírez	"No Podrás"	Team full	Team full	Team full	Team full
Episode 41 (Tuesday, 17 August)	1	Lali	"Mi reflejo"	Azul Masjuan	Eugenia Celli	"Brillo"	Team full	Team full	Team full	Team full
Episode 41 (Tuesday, 17 August)	2	Mau y Ricky	"Ojalá"	Magdalena Cullen	Pablo Santillán	"Un Año"	Team full	Team full	Team full	Team full
Episode 41 (Tuesday, 17 August)	3	Soledad	"Oncemil"	Francisco Benítez	Josefina Arenas	"Perdón, Perdón"	Team full	Team full	Team full	Team full
Episode 41 (Tuesday, 17 August)	4	Montaner	"Unchained Melody"	Jacinta Sandoval	Jessica Amicucci	"Run to You"	Team full	Team full	Team full	Team full

== Playoffs ==
During each of the four nights of Playoffs, the eight artists from each team performed. At the end of each round, each coach picked six artists to advance. The top 24 artists moved on to the next round. Abel Pintos served as a mega mentor during this round.

Playoffs color key
Artist was saved by his/her coach
Artist was eliminated

Playoffs results
Episode	Coach	Order	Artist	Song	Result
Episode 42 (Wednesday, 18 August)	Lali	1	Margarita López	"Rezo por vos"	Lali's choice
Episode 42 (Wednesday, 18 August)	Lali	2	Azul Masjuan	"Holding Out for a Hero"	Lali's choice
Episode 42 (Wednesday, 18 August)	Lali	3	Paula Chouhy	"That's Life"	Lali's choice
Episode 42 (Wednesday, 18 August)	Lali	4	Franco Leiva	"La bestia pop"	Eliminated
Episode 42 (Wednesday, 18 August)	Lali	5	Esperanza Careri	"At Last"	Lali's choice
Episode 42 (Wednesday, 18 August)	Lali	6	Franco Maceroni	"Cae el sol"	Eliminated
Episode 42 (Wednesday, 18 August)	Lali	7	Nicolás Olmedo	"New Sensation"	Lali's choice
Episode 42 (Wednesday, 18 August)	Lali	8	Santiago Borda	"Tormento"	Lali's choice
Episode 43 (Thursday, 19 August)	Montaner	1	Denis & Axel Ortiz	"Mientes"	Montaner's choice
Episode 43 (Thursday, 19 August)	Montaner	2	Jacinta Sandoval	"Contigo en la Distancia"	Montaner's choice
Episode 43 (Thursday, 19 August)	Montaner	3	Ezequiel Pedraza	"La llave"	Montaner's choice
Episode 43 (Thursday, 19 August)	Montaner	4	Bianca Cherutti	"Falsas Esperanzas"	Montaner's choice
Episode 43 (Thursday, 19 August)	Montaner	5	Sergio Verón	"Sombras nada más"	Montaner's choice
Episode 43 (Thursday, 19 August)	Montaner	6	Ana Paula Rodríguez	"Perdóname"	Eliminated
Episode 43 (Thursday, 19 August)	Montaner	7	Sebastián Pérez	"Since I Don't Have You"	Eliminated
Episode 43 (Thursday, 19 August)	Montaner	8	Steffanía Útaro	"Make You Feel My Love"	Montaner's choice
Episode 44 (Friday, 20 August)	Soledad	1	Alex Freidig	"Contigo"	Soledad's choice
Episode 44 (Friday, 20 August)	Soledad	2	Victoria May	"The Winner Takes It All"	Eliminated
Episode 44 (Friday, 20 August)	Soledad	3	Luna Suárez	"Tumbas de la gloria"	Soledad's choice
Episode 44 (Friday, 20 August)	Soledad	4	Patricio Mai	"Tragedy"	Soledad's choice
Episode 44 (Friday, 20 August)	Soledad	5	Guido Encinas	"Darte un Beso"	Eliminated
Episode 44 (Friday, 20 August)	Soledad	6	Francisco Benítez	"Así Fue"	Soledad's choice
Episode 44 (Friday, 20 August)	Soledad	7	Emanuel Rivero	"Melodía de arrabal"	Soledad's choice
Episode 44 (Friday, 20 August)	Soledad	8	Santiago Costas	"Jazmín de Luna"	Soledad's choice
Episode 45 (Sunday, 22 August)	Mau y Ricky	1	Facundo Giovos	"Fuego de Noche, Nieve de Día"	Mau y Ricky's choice
Episode 45 (Sunday, 22 August)	Mau y Ricky	2	Solange López	"Con las ganas"	Eliminated
Episode 45 (Sunday, 22 August)	Mau y Ricky	3	Magdalena Cullen	"Muchacha (ojos de papel)"	Mau y Ricky's choice
Episode 45 (Sunday, 22 August)	Mau y Ricky	4	Marcos Olaguibet	"Canguro"	Mau y Ricky's choice
Episode 45 (Sunday, 22 August)	Mau y Ricky	5	Luz Gaggi	"El Farsante"	Mau y Ricky's choice
Episode 45 (Sunday, 22 August)	Mau y Ricky	6	Camila Garay	"Corazón mentiroso"	Mau y Ricky's choice
Episode 45 (Sunday, 22 August)	Mau y Ricky	7	Melanie Vargas	"Uno más uno"	Eliminated
Episode 45 (Sunday, 22 August)	Mau y Ricky	8	Lautaro Cabrera	"Eres"	Mau y Ricky's choice

Non-competition performances
Order	Performers	Song
42.1	Lali & her team (Azul Masjuan, Esperanza Careri, Franco Leiva, Franco Maceroni, Margarita López, Nicolás Olmedo, Paula Chouhy, and Santiago Borda)	"Soy"
43.1	Ricardo Montaner & his team (Ana Paula Rodríguez, Bianca Cherutti, Denis & Axel Ortiz, Ezequiel Pedraza, Jacinta Sandoval, Sebastián Pérez, Sergio Verón, and Steffanía Útaro)	"Volver"
44.1	Soledad Pastorutti & her team (Alex Freidig, Emanuel Rivero, Francisco Benitez, Guido Encinas, Luna Suárez, Patricio Mai, Santiago Costas, and Victoria May)	"La música de mi vida"
45.1	Mau y Ricky & their team (Camila Garay, Facundo Giovos, Lautaro Cabrera, Luz Gaggi, Magdalena Cullen, Marcos Olaguibet, Melanie Vargas, and Solange López)	"Papás"

== The Comeback Stage ==
For this season, the show added a brand new phase of competition called The Comeback Stage, exclusive to MiTelefe mobile app, La Voz Argentina YouTube channel, Instagram TV, Facebook, Twitter, and Telefe.com. Fifth coach Emilia Mernes selected artists who did not turn a chair during the Blind auditions as well as eliminated artists from later rounds of the competition.

Comeback Stage color key
Artist was chosen to advance to the next round
Artist was initially chosen to advance, but did not
Artist was eliminated
Artist received majority of the coaches' votes and got a spot into the Top 25

=== First round ===
During the first round of competition, the ten selected artists went head to head, two artists per episode, and Mernes selected a winner to move on to the next round. Originally, Mernes declared seven artists as winners in their battles, but at the end of this round she had to select only four to advance.

Episode (Digital)	Coach	Song	Artists		Song
Episode 1 (Thursday, 1 July)	Emilia Mernes	"All I Ask"	Ignacio Sagalá	Emma Lusicich	"Qué será de ti"
Episode 2 (Thursday, 8 July)	Emilia Mernes	"Será"	Luis Carrasco	Jaqueline Boghossian (Note: Emilia could not decide on a winner between Jaqueline and Luis. Initially, with approval from the producers, both artists were declared winners. However, at the end of the round, Emilia could only choose four out of the seven winners to advance.)	"She"
Episode 3 (Thursday, 15 July)	Emilia Mernes	"Talking to the Moon"	Sol Lucena (Note: Out of the seven winners, Emilia could choose only four to advance.)	Andrés Cantos	"Zamba de amor en el recuerdo"
Episode 4 (Thursday, 22 July)	Emilia Mernes	"Never Enough"	María Belén Abba	Julieta García & Melissa de Miguel	"No te creas tan importante"
Episode 5 (Thursday, 29 July)	Emilia Mernes	"Me estás atrapando otra vez"	Maximiliano Zarza	Bárbara Bonelli (Note: Emilia found it difficult in deciding on a winner between Maximiliano and Bárbara. Initially, with approval from the producers, both artists were declared winners. However, at the end of the round, Emilia could only choose four out of the seven winners to advance.)	"El tiempo es veloz"

=== Second round ===
In the second round, Mernes brought back four artists who were eliminated during the main competition Battles, giving them a chance to re-enter in the competition. These artists faced off against the four artists from the first round.

Episode (Digital)	Coach	Order	Winner	Song	Loser
Episode 6 (Thursday, 5 August)	Emilia Mernes	1	María Belén Abba	"If I Ain't Got You"	Alejandra Rama Palazzo
Episode 6 (Thursday, 5 August)	Emilia Mernes	2	Lucas Oviedo	"Si Tú Supieras"	Luis Carrasco
Episode 7 (Thursday, 12 August)	Emilia Mernes	1	Gustavo Tacchi	"Un vestido y una flor"	Maximiliano Zarza
Episode 7 (Thursday, 12 August)	Emilia Mernes	2	Ignacio Sagalá (Note: Emilia was given a wildcard to declare winners the two artists of a battle. She decided to use it in this battle, so both Ignacio and Fernanda advanced to the next round.)	"Titanium"	N/A
Episode 7 (Thursday, 12 August)	Emilia Mernes	2	Fernanda Romero	"Titanium"	N/A

=== Third round ===
In the third round, the five remaining artists and two artists who were eliminated during the main competition Knockouts performed in front of Emilia and three were selected to perform in a fourth and final round.

Episode (Digital)	Coach	Order	Artist	Song
Episode 8 (Thursday, 19 August)	Emilia Mernes	1	Gustavo Tacchi	"Spaghetti del rock"
Episode 8 (Thursday, 19 August)	Emilia Mernes	2	María Belén Abba	"Shallow"
Episode 8 (Thursday, 19 August)	Emilia Mernes	3	Josefina Arenas	"El adivino"
Episode 8 (Thursday, 19 August)	Emilia Mernes	4	Fernanda Romero	"My Heart Will Go On"
Episode 8 (Thursday, 19 August)	Emilia Mernes	5	Lucas Oviedo	"No saber de ti"
Episode 8 (Thursday, 19 August)	Emilia Mernes	6	Ignacio Sagalá	"Love of My Life"
Episode 8 (Thursday, 19 August)	Emilia Mernes	7	Johana Vera	"Gracias a la Vida"

=== Final round (Lives' Round of 25) ===
The contestants performed in the first night of the round of 25 for the main competition coaches' vote, with the winner officially joining one of the four main teams. Ignacio Sagalá was declared winner with 3 out of 4 votes and he decided to join Ricardo Montaner's team.

Episode	Coach	Winner		Losers	
Episode	Coach	Song	Artist	Artists	Songs
Episode 46 (Monday, 23 August)	Emilia Mernes	"Without You"	Ignacio Sagalá	Fernanda Romero	"En cambio no"
Episode 46 (Monday, 23 August)	Emilia Mernes	"Without You"	Ignacio Sagalá	Gustavo Tacchi	"Maravillosa esta noche"

== Live shows ==
The live shows started on 23 August and have four different rounds: Round of 25, Quarterfinals, Semifinals and Final. Public votes were introduced in the Quarterfinals.

Live shows color key
Artist was saved by the public's vote
Artist was saved by his/her coach
Artist was eliminated

=== Round of 25 ===
Round of 25 results
Episode	Coach	Order	Artist	Song	Result
Episode 46 (Monday, 23 August)	Lali	1	Margarita López	"Bette Davis Eyes"	Lali's choice
Episode 46 (Monday, 23 August)	Lali	2	Nicolás Olmedo	"Irresponsables"	Lali's choice
Episode 46 (Monday, 23 August)	Lali	3	Esperanza Careri	"I Will Always Love You"	Eliminated
Episode 46 (Monday, 23 August)	Lali	4	Azul Masjuan	"Don't Stop Me Now"	Eliminated
Episode 46 (Monday, 23 August)	Lali	5	Santiago Borda	"Recuérdame"	Lali's choice
Episode 46 (Monday, 23 August)	Lali	6	Paula Chouhy	"Man in the Mirror"	Lali's choice
Episode 47 (Tuesday, 24 August)	Montaner	1	Jacinta Sandoval	"Something's Got a Hold on Me"	Montaner's choice
Episode 47 (Tuesday, 24 August)	Montaner	2	Denis & Axel Ortiz	"Decidiste dejarme"	Montaner's choice
Episode 47 (Tuesday, 24 August)	Montaner	3	Ezequiel Pedraza	"El mismo aire"	Montaner's choice
Episode 47 (Tuesday, 24 August)	Montaner	4	Bianca Cherutti	"Por Lo Que Reste De Vida"	Eliminated
Episode 47 (Tuesday, 24 August)	Montaner	5	Steffanía Útaro	"What a Wonderful World"	Montaner's choice
Episode 47 (Tuesday, 24 August)	Montaner	6	Sergio Verón	"La copa rota"	Eliminated
Episode 47 (Tuesday, 24 August)	Montaner	7	Ignacio Sagalá	"Con te partirò"	Montaner's choice
Episode 48 (Wednesday, 25 August)	Soledad	1	Emanuel Rivero	"Te quiero"	Eliminated
Episode 48 (Wednesday, 25 August)	Soledad	2	Patricio Mai	"Grace Kelly"	Soledad's choice
Episode 48 (Wednesday, 25 August)	Soledad	3	Luna Suárez	"Anyone"	Soledad's choice
Episode 48 (Wednesday, 25 August)	Soledad	4	Santiago Costas	"Cómo te voy a olvidar"	Eliminated
Episode 48 (Wednesday, 25 August)	Soledad	5	Francisco Benítez	"Hasta Que Me Olvides"	Soledad's choice
Episode 48 (Wednesday, 25 August)	Soledad	6	Alex Freidig	"Zona de promesas"	Soledad's choice
Episode 49 (Thursday, 26 August)	Mau y Ricky	1	Marcos Olaguibet	"Circles"	Mau y Ricky's choice
Episode 49 (Thursday, 26 August)	Mau y Ricky	2	Camila Garay	"Miénteme"	Eliminated
Episode 49 (Thursday, 26 August)	Mau y Ricky	3	Lautaro Cabrera	"Promesas sobre el bidet"	Mau y Ricky's choice
Episode 49 (Thursday, 26 August)	Mau y Ricky	4	Facundo Giovos	"Quisiera Ser"	Eliminated
Episode 49 (Thursday, 26 August)	Mau y Ricky	5	Luz Gaggi	"No importa la distancia"	Mau y Ricky's choice
Episode 49 (Thursday, 26 August)	Mau y Ricky	6	Magdalena Cullen	"El breve espacio en que no estás"	Mau y Ricky's choice

=== Quarterfinals ===
Quarterfinals results
Episode	Coach	Order	Artist	Song	Result
Episode 50 (Friday, 27 August)	Lali	1	Margarita López	"Superstition"	Eliminated
Episode 50 (Friday, 27 August)	Lali	2	Santiago Borda	"Penumbras"	Public's vote
Episode 50 (Friday, 27 August)	Lali	3	Paula Chouhy	"Your Song"	Public's vote
Episode 50 (Friday, 27 August)	Lali	4	Nicolás Olmedo	"Fix You"	Public's vote
Episode 51 (Sunday, 29 August)	Montaner	1	Denis & Axel Ortiz	"Creo en ti"	Public's vote
Episode 51 (Sunday, 29 August)	Montaner	2	Ezequiel Pedraza	"Volver a amar"	Public's vote
Episode 51 (Sunday, 29 August)	Montaner	3	Steffania Uttaro	"Será"	Public's vote
Episode 51 (Sunday, 29 August)	Montaner	4	Ignacio Sagalá	"La Saeta"	Public's vote
Episode 51 (Sunday, 29 August)	Montaner	5	Jacinta Sandoval	"Adoro"	Eliminated
Episode 52 (Monday, 30 August)	Soledad	1	Patricio Mai	"No hace falta que lo digas"	Eliminated
Episode 52 (Monday, 30 August)	Soledad	2	Luna Suárez	"I Feel Good"	Public's vote
Episode 52 (Monday, 30 August)	Soledad	3	Francisco Benítez	"Universo paralelo"	Public's vote
Episode 52 (Monday, 30 August)	Soledad	4	Alex Freidig	"Para siempre"	Public's vote
Episode 53 (Tuesday, 31 August)	Mau y Ricky	1	Magdalena Cullen	"Zamba de usted"	Public's vote
Episode 53 (Tuesday, 31 August)	Mau y Ricky	2	Marlos Olaguibet	"Adán y Eva"	Public's vote
Episode 53 (Tuesday, 31 August)	Mau y Ricky	3	Luz Gaggi	"Chandelier"	Public's vote
Episode 53 (Tuesday, 31 August)	Mau y Ricky	4	Lautaro Cabrera	"Contigo aprendí"	Eliminated

Non-competition performances
Order	Performers	Song
50.1	Lali & her team (Margarita López, Nicolás Olmedo, Paula Chouhy, and Santiago Borda)	"Pronta entrega"
51.1	Ricardo Montaner & his team (Denis & Axel Ortiz, Ezequiel Pedraza, Jacinta Sandoval, Ignacio Sagalá, and Steffanía Útaro)	"Soy feliz"
51.2	Nicki Nicole & Lali	"Wapo tracketero" / "Boomerang"
52.1	Soledad Pastorutti & her team (Alex Freidig, Francisco Benitez, Luna Suárez, and Patricio Mai)	"La simple"
53.1	Mau y Ricky & their team (Lautaro Cabrera, Luz Gaggi, Magdalena Cullen, and Marcos Olaguibet)	"Vente pa' ca" / "Sin pijama"
53.2	Ricardo Montaner & Nahuel Pennisi	"Me va a extrañar"

=== Semifinals ===
Semifinals results
Episode	Coach	Order	Artist	Song	Result
Episode 54 (Wednesday, 1 September)	Lali	1	Santiago Borda	"Livin' la Vida Loca"	Eliminated
Episode 54 (Wednesday, 1 September)	Lali	2	Paula Chouhy	"Too Much Love Will Kill You"	Eliminated
Episode 54 (Wednesday, 1 September)	Lali	3	Nicolás Olmedo	"Feel"	Public's vote
Episode 54 (Wednesday, 1 September)	Montaner	4	Ignacio Sagalá	"Vivo por ella"	Eliminated
Episode 54 (Wednesday, 1 September)	Montaner	5	Steffanía Útaro	"Mujer contra mujer"	Eliminated
Episode 54 (Wednesday, 1 September)	Montaner	6	Ezequiel Pedraza	"Dígale"	Public's vote
Episode 54 (Wednesday, 1 September)	Montaner	7	Denis & Axel Ortiz	"Hoy tengo ganas de ti"	Eliminated
Episode 55 (Thursday, 2 September)	Soledad	1	Alex Freidig	"Canción de las simples cosas"	Eliminated
Episode 55 (Thursday, 2 September)	Soledad	2	Luna Suárez	"Rise Up"	Eliminated
Episode 55 (Thursday, 2 September)	Soledad	3	Francisco Benitez	"Como la cigarra"	Public's vote
Episode 55 (Thursday, 2 September)	Mau y Ricky	4	Magdalena Cullen	"Alguien"	Eliminated
Episode 55 (Thursday, 2 September)	Mau y Ricky	5	Luz Gaggi	"Jealous"	Public's vote
Episode 55 (Thursday, 2 September)	Mau y Ricky	6	Marcos Olaguibet	"Corazón delator"	Eliminated

Non-competition performances
Order	Performers	Song
54.1	Soledad Pastorutti & David Lebón	"El tiempo es veloz"
55.1	Mau y Ricky & María Becerra	"Mal acostumbrao"

=== Finale ===
The Finale aired on Sunday, 5 September, where the final 4 performed a solo cover song and a duet with their coach.

Finale results
Episode	Coach	Artist	Order	Solo song	Order	Duet song (with coach)	Result
Episode 56	Aired on Friday, 3 September, this special episode featured the road to the finale from each finalist, reviewing their performances throughout the competition.						
Episode 57 (Sunday, 5 September)	Lali	Nicolás Olmedo	1	"Resistiré"	6	"Amor es presente"	Third place
Episode 57 (Sunday, 5 September)	Mau y Ricky	Luz Gaggi	5	"Halo"	2	"La boca"	Runner-up
Episode 57 (Sunday, 5 September)	Soledad	Francisco Benitez	3	"Gracias a la Vida"	7	"Aunque me digas que no"	Winner
Episode 57 (Sunday, 5 September)	Montaner	Ezequiel Pedraza	8	"Entrégate"	4	"Déjame llorar"	Fourth place

== Elimination chart ==
=== Color key ===
Artist's info

- Team Montaner
- Team Soledad
- Team Mau y Ricky
- Team Lali

Result details

- Winner
- Runner-up
- Third place
- Fourth place
- Saved by the public
- Saved by his/her coach
- Eliminated

=== Overall ===
Live shows' results
Artists	Round of 25	Quarterfinals	Semifinals	Finale
Francisco Benitez	Safe	Safe	Safe	Winner
Luz Gaggi	Safe	Safe	Safe	Runner-up
Nicolás Olmedo	Safe	Safe	Safe	3rd Place
Ezequiel Pedraza	Safe	Safe	Safe	4th Place
Alex Freidig	Safe	Safe	Eliminated	Eliminated (semifinals)
Denis & Axel Ortiz	Safe	Safe	Eliminated	Eliminated (semifinals)
Ignacio Sagalá	Safe	Safe	Eliminated	Eliminated (semifinals)
Luna Suárez	Safe	Safe	Eliminated	Eliminated (semifinals)
Magdalena Cullen	Safe	Safe	Eliminated	Eliminated (semifinals)
Marcos Olaguibet	Safe	Safe	Eliminated	Eliminated (semifinals)
Paula Chouhy	Safe	Safe	Eliminated	Eliminated (semifinals)
Santiago Borda	Safe	Safe	Eliminated	Eliminated (semifinals)
Steffanía Útaro	Safe	Safe	Eliminated	Eliminated (semifinals)
Jacinta Sandoval	Safe	Eliminated	Eliminated (quarterfinals)	
Lautaro Cabrera	Safe	Eliminated	Eliminated (quarterfinals)	
Margarita López	Safe	Eliminated	Eliminated (quarterfinals)	
Patricio Mai	Safe	Eliminated	Eliminated (quarterfinals)	
Azul Masjuan	Eliminated	Eliminated (round of 25)		
Bianca Cherutti	Eliminated	Eliminated (round of 25)		
Camila Garay	Eliminated	Eliminated (round of 25)		
Emanuel Rivero	Eliminated	Eliminated (round of 25)		
Esperanza Careri	Eliminated	Eliminated (round of 25)		
Facundo Giovos	Eliminated	Eliminated (round of 25)		
Santiago Costas	Eliminated	Eliminated (round of 25)		
Sergio Verón	Eliminated	Eliminated (round of 25)		

=== Teams ===
Live shows' results
Artists	Round of 25	Quarterfinals	Semifinals	Finale
Ezequiel Pedraza	Coach's choice	Public's vote	Public's vote	Fourth place
Denis & Axel Ortiz	Coach's choice	Public's vote	Eliminated	
Ignacio Sagalá	Coach's choice	Public's vote	Eliminated	
Steffanía Útaro	Coach's choice	Public's vote	Eliminated	
Jacinta Sandoval	Coach's choice	Eliminated		
Bianca Cherutti	Eliminated			
Sergio Verón	Eliminated			
Francisco Benitez	Coach's choice	Public's vote	Public's vote	Winner
Luna Suárez	Coach's choice	Public's vote	Eliminated	
Alex Freidig	Coach's choice	Public's vote	Eliminated	
Patricio Mai	Coach's choice	Eliminated		
Emanuel Rivero	Eliminated			
Santiago Costas	Eliminated			
Luz Gaggi	Coach's choice	Public's vote	Public's vote	Runner-up
Magdalena Cullen	Coach's choice	Public's vote	Eliminated	
Marcos Olaguibet	Coach's choice	Public's vote	Eliminated	
Lautaro Cabrera	Coach's choice	Eliminated		
Camila Garay	Eliminated			
Facundo Giovos	Eliminated			
Nicolás Olmedo	Coach's choice	Public's vote	Public's vote	Third place
Paula Chouhy	Coach's choice	Public's vote	Eliminated	
Santiago Borda	Coach's choice	Public's vote	Eliminated	
Margarita López	Coach's choice	Eliminated		
Azul Masjuan	Eliminated			
Esperanza Careri	Eliminated			
