= Lajitas =

Lajitas:

- Lajitas, Texas is an unincorporated community in Brewster County, Texas, United States, in proximity to the Big Bend National Park.
- Las Lajitas is a town and municipality in Anta department, Salta Province in northwestern Argentina.
