= Vivir =

Vivir may refer to:

- "Vivir" (song), a 2004 song by Belinda, from the album Belinda
- Vivir (album), a 1997 album by Enrique Iglesias
