= Belinda (Belinda Peregrín album) =

Studio album by Belinda Peregrín
- Released: 5 August 2003
- Recorded: 2003
- Genres: Latin pop; teen pop; pop rock
- Length: 45:16
- Languages: Spanish; English
- Labels: BMG Mexico; RCA
- Producers: Rudy Pérez; Graeme Pleeth; Mauri Stern; Robin Barter

Belinda Peregrín chronology
Belinda (2003)	Total (2006)

Singles from Belinda
- 1. "Lo Siento" Released: 7 July 2003; 2. "Boba Niña Nice" Released: 5 December 2003; 3. "Ángel" Released: 13 February 2004; 4. "Vivir" Released: 28 June 2004; 5. "No Entiendo" Released: 2004; 6. "Be Free" Released: 2005; 7. "¿Dónde Iré Yo?" Released: 2005

Belinda is the debut studio album by Spanish singer and actress Belinda Peregrín. It was released in Mexico by Sony BMG Mexico and internationally by RCA Records on 5 August 2003. The album was certified double Platinum and Gold in Mexico on 11 March 2005.

== Album information ==
Her international self-titled album Belinda was released by Sony BMG and RCA Records on August 5, 2003, with success, topping many countries including Mexico. The album was produced by Mauri Stern, Robin Barter, Graeme Pleeth and Rudy Pérez. It included hit singles such as "Lo Siento", "Boba Niña Nice", and "Ángel", the single "Vivir", was also chosen as the main theme song for Corazones al límite, a soap opera that she briefly appeared in. There were multiple releases of the album from 2003 through 2004, including remixes and bonus tracks. Belinda was later released on February 25, 2005, along with the DVD Tour Fiesta en la Azotea.

== Promotion ==
Belinda promoted the album with the Fiesta en la Azotea Tour, between 2004 and 2005. She performed over 200 times across Mexico, Guatemala, Puerto Rico, El Salvador, Panama, Colombia, Chile, Argentina, Venezuela, United States, Portugal and Spain. The attendance broke records with 1.8 million people mark. She broke the record after 12 sold-out concerts at the National Auditorium. At the Zócalo (Mexico City) she had an attendance of over 125,000.

She performed Lo Siento on Escandalo on July 14, 2003; on Hoy on August 6, 2003, and on TVE on December 7, 2003. Boba Niña Nice on Hoy on August 6, 2003, and on Tesoro de la Navidad on December 22, 2003. Ángel on No Manches on December 20, 2003; on Raul Gil on June 3, 2004; on Otro Rollo on July 26, 2004, and on El Show de Cristina on September 3, 2004. Vivir on No Manches on August 14, 2004; on Despierta America on August 30, 2004. No Entiendo on Hoy on November 2, 2005; on SIC on December 16, 2005, and on TVE on December 20, 2005.

== Commercial performance ==
Belinda debuted at number #8 on the Mexican Albums Chart in August 2003. It topped the chart for 4 weeks in 2004, and 4 weeks in 2005. The album was certified Gold on September 7, 2003; Platinum on November 25, 2003; Platinum+Gold on February 11, 2004; Double Platinum on November 5, 2004; Double Platinum+Gold on December 1, 2004; Triple Platinum on March 11, 2005; Triple Platinum+Gold on November 2, 2005.

It debuted at #72 and later made the Top 40 in Spain, where it was certified Gold for over 50,000 copies sold. 'Belinda' peaked at #6 on U.S. Billboard Latin Pop Albums and sold over 177,000 copies on the US.

== Track listing ==
No.	Title	Writer(s)	Producer(s)	Length
1.	"Lo Siento" (I'm Sorry)	Belinda; Lucy Abbott; Sara Eker; Cheryl Parker; Twin; Mauri Stern	Mauri Stern; Graeme Pleeth; Robin Barter	3:30
2.	"Ángel" (Once In Your Lifetime)	Belinda; Pleeth; Shellie Poole; Stern	Stern; Pleeth; Barter	3:42
3.	"Boba Niña Nice" (Teenage Superstar)	Daniel Gibson; Jörgen Ringqvist; Belinda; Stern	Stern; Pleeth; Barter	3:02
4.	"Vivir" (Any Better)	Gustav "Grizzly" Jonsson; Marcus "Mack" Sepehrmanesh; Tommy Tysper; Belinda; Stern	Stern; Pleeth; Barter	3:04
5.	"Princesa"	Adrián Posse; Rudy Pérez; Cynthia Salazar	Rudy Pérez	3:46
6.	"Niña de Ayer" (Everyday Girl)	Fredrik Björk; Per Eklund; Belinda; Stern	Stern; Pleeth; Barter	3:26
7.	"No Entiendo" (I Don't Understand You)	Daniel Gibson; Belinda; Stern	Stern; Pleeth; Barter	4:04
8.	"Be Free"	Belinda	Stern; Pleeth; Barter	3:35
9.	"¿Dónde Iré Yo?" (Disposition)	Robert Habolin; Mats Jansson; Sepehrmanesh; Belinda; Stern; Pichardo González	Stern; Pleeth; Barter	3:33
10.	"Voy A Conquistarte" (I'm Gonna Make You Love Me)	Fredrik Hult; Åsa Larsson; Peter Landin; Kent Larsson; Belinda; Stern	Stern; Pleeth; Barter	3:23
11.	"Lo Puedo Lograr" (Someday)	Niklas Hillbom; Thomas Jansson; Belinda; Stern	Stern; Pleeth; Barter	2:59
12.	"Sin Dolor" (Turn The Page)	Andreas Carlsson; Alban Herlitz; Negin Djafari; Belinda; Stern	Stern; Pleeth; Barter	3:51
13.	"Fuerte"	Adrián Posse, Pérez	Rudy Pérez	3:17

Belinda (repackage)
No.	Title	Producer(s)	Length
14.	"No Entiendo" (featuring Andy & Lucas)	Stern; Pleeth; Barter	4:05

Belinda (enhanced)
No.	Title	Length
14.	"Lo Siento (remix main version)"	5:15
15.	"Boba Niña Nice (Niño Power mix)"	3:14
16.	"Lo Siento" (music video)	3:30
17.	"Boba Niña Nice" (music video)	3:02

Belinda: edición especial
No.	Title	Length
14.	"Ángel (acoustic version)"	3:41
15.	"Vivir (acoustic version)"	3:14
16.	"Lo Siento (remix main version)"	5:15
17.	"Boba Niña Nice (Niño Power mix)"	5:20
18.	"Ángel (extended remix)"	6:26

=== DVD ===
1. "Lo Siento"
2. "Boba Niña Nice"
3. "Ángel"
4. Detrás de Cámaras "Ángel"
5. Detrás de Cámaras "Azotea"

== Charts ==
Chart (2003–2004)	Peak position
Argentina Top 20 Albums Chart	3
Mexican Top 100 Albums Chart	1
Spain Top 100 Albums Chart	72
U.S. Billboard Latin Pop Albums	6
U.S. Billboard Top Latin Albums	28
U.S. Billboard Top Heatseekers (South Atlantic)	4
Year-end chart (2005)	Peak position
Mexican Top 100 Annual Albums Chart	52

== Sales and certifications ==
Region	Certification	Certified units/sales
Argentina (CAPIF)	Gold	20,000^{^}
Central America (CFC)	Platinum	20,000
Chile	Gold	10,000
Colombia (ASINCOL)	Gold	10,000
Guatemala	Platinum+Gold	15,000
Mexico (AMPROFON)	2× Platinum+Gold	300,000
Panama	Platinum	10,000
Spain (Promusicae)	Gold	50,000
United States (RIAA)	Platinum (Latin)	177,000
Venezuela (APFV)	Platinum+Gold	45,000
^{^} Shipments figures based on certification alone.
