= I Don't Understand You =

2002 single by K-Otic

Single by K-Otic

from the album Indestructible
- Released: 2002
- Recorded: 2002
- Genre: Pop
- Length: 3:58
- Label: Jive Records
- Songwriter(s): Daniel Gibson
- Producer(s): Daniel Gibson

K-Otic singles chronology
"I Surrender" (2002)	"I Don't Understand You" (2002)	"Tears Won't Dry" (2003)

Audio
- "I Don't Understand You" on YouTube

"I Don't Understand You" is the second single by the Dutch band K-Otic, from their studio album Indestructible, released in 2002.

== Information ==
The song was written and produced by Daniel Gibson and released in 2002.

The song has been covered by Spanish-born Mexican singer Belinda ("No Entiendo") for her debut studio album Belinda.

The single debuted at number fifty-six on Dutch Top 40 and peaked at number thirty-eight. It includes an exclusive unreleased demo recording.

=== Track listing ===
CD Single

1. I Don't Understand You (Main Version)
2. I Don't Understand You (Acoustic Version)
3. I Don't Understand You (Instrumental Version)
4. Don't Wanna Dance On Your Roses

CD Single, Cardboard Sleeve

1. I Don't Understand You (Main Version)
2. I Don't Understand You (Instrumental Version)

== Charts ==
Chart (2002)	Peak position
Netherlands (Dutch Top 40)	38
Chart (2003)	Peak position
Netherlands (Dutch Top 40)	56

== No Entiendo ==
"No Entiendo"

Single by Belinda featuring Andy & Lucas

from the album Belinda
- Released: September 2004
- Recorded: 2004
- Genre: Latin pop, soft rock
- Length: 4:04
- Label: Sony International
- Songwriter(s): Daniel Gibson, Belinda, Mauri Stern
- Producer(s): Mauri Stern

Belinda singles chronology
"Vivir" (2004)	"No Entiendo" (2004)	"Be Free" (2005)

Audio
- "No Entiendo" on YouTube

"No Entiendo" ("I Don't Understand") is the fifth single by Spanish-born Mexican singer Belinda, from her debut studio album Belinda, featuring the Spanish duo Andy & Lucas.

=== Information ===
The song was written by Daniel Gibson, adapted by Belinda, and co-adapted and produced by Mauri Stern. It is a Spanish version of the song "I Don't Understand You", by the band K-Otic.

According to an interview, the Spanish duo performed in a concert in Mexico in the Acapulco Festival in March 2004, where they meet to Belinda. From there followed the idea of recording a duet. It was made in May of that year, in studios of Mexico City.

=== Track list ===
CD Single/Promo (Spain)

1. No Entiendo

=== Music video ===
The music video was filmed in November 2004. In the video the Spanish duo es performing the song inside of a room of a department of the Plaza Mayor while Belinda does appear abroad. Belinda is photographed by a child while she's singing. Then goes to the apartment where the duo and they delivered the envelope that includes the digital camera which made the photos along with a dedication to the singer.

=== Official versions ===
- No Entiendo (Solo Version/Album Version)
- No Entiendo (featuring Andy & Lucas)
