= Cho Min-hye =

South Korean singer (born 1987)

Cho Min Hye
- Born: February 7, 1987 (age 39)
- Origin: South Korea
- Genres: Pop, Rock
- Instrument: Vocals

Korean name
- Hangul: 조민혜
- Hanja: 趙珉惠
- RR: Jo Minhye
- MR: Cho Minhye

Cho Min-hye (Korean: 조민혜; born February 7, 1987), also known as mi:ne, is a South Korean singer.

== Discography ==
=== Albums ===
- Teenage Superstar, August 18, 2006

=== Digital Singles ===
- White Dream, December 20, 2006

=== Soundtracks ===
- 기다릴게 (투니버스 애니메이션 OST) [Digital Single] [I'll Wait (Tooniverse Animations OST)], January 23, 2007

== Videography ==
=== Music Videos ===
Title	Year	Director(s)
"Teenage Superstar"		

== Sources ==
- 조민혜 in Daum
- 조민혜 in soribada
- 조민혜 in last.fm
- 조민혜 in iTunes
