= Be Free (song) =

Single by Belinda

from the album Belinda
- Released: February 2005
- Recorded: 2003
- Genre: Pop, teen pop
- Length: 3:33
- Label: Sony International
- Songwriter: Belinda
- Producer: Graeme Pleeth

Belinda singles chronology
"No Entiendo" (2004)	"Be Free" (2005)	"¿Dónde Iré Yo?" (2005)

Music video
- "Be Free" on YouTube

Audio
- "Be Free" on YouTube

"Be Free" is the sixth single released by Mexican singer Belinda, taken from her debut album Belinda.

== Information ==
It reached No. 3 in Mexico, No. 62 in Slovenia, and No. 99 in Bosnia and Herzegovina. Belinda was the first Mexican artist who released a song in English and entered the Yugoslav charts. The song was written mostly to introduce Belinda to an English speaking audience, but the attempt failed. She later achieved success by starring in the Disney Channel original film The Cheetah Girls 2.
