= Teenage Superstar =

Single by Kim-Lian

from the album Balance
- Released: 4 September 2003
- Recorded: 2003
- Genre: Pop rock, teen pop
- Length: 3:09
- Label: CMM Records
- Songwriter(s): Daniel Gibson, Jörgen Ringqvist
- Producer(s): Daniel Gibson, Jörgen Ringqvist

Kim-Lian singles chronology
"Teenage Superstar" (2003)	"Hey Boy!" (2004)

"Teenage Superstar" is the debut single of Dutch pop rock music singer Kim-Lian.

== Information ==
The song was released on 4 September 2003 as the first single of her debut album Balance. It reached the top of the charts in Indonesia and ended on number five in the Netherlands.

== Track listing ==
CD single (Netherlands, Belgium)

1. "Teenage Superstar" [Radio Edit]
2. "Teenage Superstar" [B.T.S.Y. Mix]
3. "Teenage Superstar" [Enhanced Video]
4. "Superstar in Sweden" [Enhanced Video]

CD single (Sweden)

1. "Teenage Superstar" [Album Version]
2. "Teenage Superstar" [B.T.S.Y. Mix]

== Music video ==
The video was shot in a German carnival park, where Kim-Lian and her friends turn the park upside down. Throughout the scenes, Kim-Lian is shot in a big coupe singing with her band. The music couldn't be very loud in that coupe because the echo was too loud. It was released on 4 April 2005.

== Charts ==
=== Weekly charts ===
Chart (2003)	Peak position
Belgium (Ultratop 50 Flanders)	24
Netherlands (Dutch Top 40)	6
Netherlands (Single Top 100)	5
Sweden (Sverigetopplistan)	26

=== Year-end charts ===
Chart (2003)	Position
Netherlands (Dutch Top 40)	59
Netherlands (Single Top 100)	37

== Belinda – Boba niña nice (Spanish cover) ==
"Boba niña nice"

Single by Belinda

from the album Belinda
- Released: December 2003
- Recorded: 2003
- Genre: Pop rock
- Length: 3:02
- Label: Sony International
- Songwriter(s): Daniel Gibson, Jörgen Ringqvist
- Producer(s): Mauri Stern

Belinda singles chronology
"Lo Siento" (2003)	"Boba niña nice" (2003)	"Ángel" (2004)

Audio
- "Boba Niña Nice" on YouTube

"Boba niña nice" is the second single of Mexican pop/rock singer Belinda from her self-titled debut studio album Belinda.

=== Information ===
The song was written by Daniel Gibson and Jörgen Ringqvist; adapted by Belinda, co-adapted and produced by Mauri Stern. It is a Spanish version of "Teenage Superstar" by Dutch singer Kim-Lian.

=== Track listing ===
Mexican CD Single/Promo

1. Boba niña nice

=== Music video ===
The music video was directed by Victor González and released in December 2003. It starts with scenes of Belinda singing the song with a band on a building, these scenes are shown largely throughout the video. Later Belinda is shown walking with a group of friends and singing the song to a guy with a friend while sitting on a car.

The video continues with scenes of people skateboarding and biking, scenes of Belinda singing the song with different outfits, choreography and a dance battle.

== Other versions ==
The song has been covered by Japanese singer Nami Tamaki ("High School Queen"), Portuguese group D'ZRT ("Para mim tanto me faz"), Spanish group Efecto Mariposa ("Que más da"), Polish Czech singer Ewa Farna ("Měls mě vůbec rád" and "Razem sam na sam") and Korean singer MI:NE Cho Min Hye ("Teenage Superstar").
