= Las Lajitas =

Coordinates: 24°41′S 64°15′W

- Municipality and town
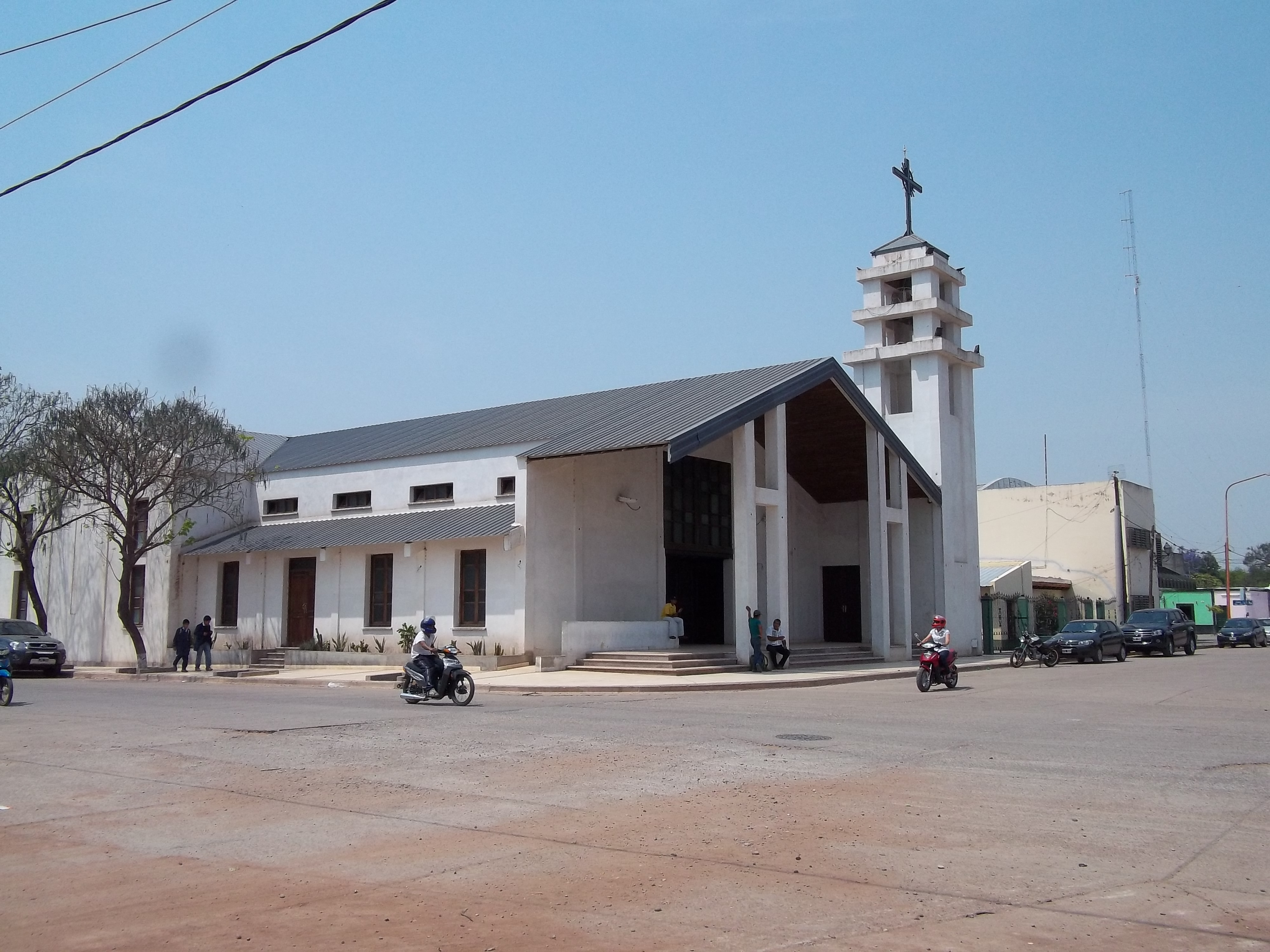
- Interactive map of Las Lajitas
- Country: Argentina
- Province: Salta Province

Government
  - Type: Municipality
  - Intendant: Fernando Alabi (PRS)

Population (2001)
  - Total: 7,688
- Time zone: UTC−3 (ART)
- Postal code: A4449

Las Lajitas is a town and municipality in Anta department, Salta Province in northwestern Argentina. It is about 230 km from the capitol by Ruta Nacional 34 and then by RP 272. It also belongs to Área Agroecológica Chaco Semiárido. It produces cereals, beans, oil and wood. The rain level is about 600–800 mm between October and May.
