= Lo Siento (Belinda Peregrín song) =

Single by Belinda Peregrín

from the album Belinda
- Released: July 7, 2003
- Recorded: 2003
- Genre: Pop rock; teen pop
- Length: 3:30
- Label: Sony International
- Songwriters: Lucy Abbot, Sara Eker, Cheryl Parker, Twin
- Producer: Graeme Pleeth

Belinda Peregrín singles chronology
| "Lo Siento" (2003) | "Boba Niña Nice" (2003) |

Music video
- "Lo Siento" on YouTube

"Lo Siento" (I'm Sorry) is the debut single from Belinda's debut album, Belinda (2003). The song is a cover of the song "I'm Sorry" by Ukrainian singer Mika Newton.

== Information ==
The song was written by Lucy Abbot, Sara Eker, Cheryl Parker, Twin; adapted by Belinda, co-adapted and produced by Graeme Pleeth.

=== Cover ===
- Nakanomori BAND - "TOY"

=== Track list ===
Mexican CD Single/Promo

1. Lo Siento

Spanish CD Single/Promo

1. Lo Siento

Mexican CD Single/Promo Remixes

1. Lo Siento (Remix Main Version)
2. Lo Siento (Remix Radio Edit)
3. Lo Siento (I'm Sorry)

== Music video ==
The music video for Lo Siento is just a background, shot on a green screen, with a variety of graphics and back up dancers. There is a part where Belinda has a long black dress and a pair of converse shoes and there is another scene where she wears a pink shirt. The video ends with a scene where Belinda is spray painting the words "Lo Siento" onto an imaginary wall, seeming as if she is writing on the television screen. She then walks away and the video fades out.

The music video was directed by Oliver Castro and released in September 2003.

== Charts ==
| Chart (2003–2004) | Peak position |
|---|---|
| Argentina (Notimex) | 3 |
| US Latin Pop Airplay (Billboard) | 34 |
