= Ángel (Belinda Peregrín song) =

Single by Belinda

from the album Belinda
- Released: February 13, 2004
- Recorded: 2003
- Genre: Latin pop
- Length: 3:40
- Label: Sony International
- Songwriters: Belinda; Graeme Pleeth; Shellie Poole; Stern
- Producers: Graeme Pleeth, Mauri Stern

Belinda singles chronology
"Boba Niña Nice" (2003)	"Ángel" (2004)	"Vivir" (2004)

Audio
- "Ángel" on YouTube

"Ángel" (Angel) is a song by Belinda, released as the third single from her debut studio album Belinda. It received a Gold certification in Mexico for ringtone sales.

== Information ==
The song was written by Graeme Pleeth and Shellie Poole; adapted by Belinda; produced by Graeme Pleeth and Mauri Stern. It was a significant success in Mexico.

== Music video ==
The music video was directed by Mexican video director Alejandro Lozano, and was premiered in January 2004 on MTV Latino.

In the video, Belinda plays the guardian angel of a young man (portrayed by Belinda's then boyfriend Eddy Vilard) she is in love with. He is seen driving at night by the roadside with his angel by his side, who appears to be invisible and inaudible to him, before suffering a serious accident on the road, leaving him on the verge of death. Paramedics try to save him, and just as they are about to give up, his angel (Belinda) magically brings him back to life with by placing her hand on his chest. The video alternates between scenes of Belinda singing the song on the road during the aftermath of the crash and to the boy in the copilot seat of his car while he is driving.

== Charts ==
=== Weekly charts ===
Chart performance for "Ángel"
Chart (2004–2005)	Peak position
Argentina (CAPIF)	2
Chile (Notimex)	1
El Salvador (Notimex)	1
Nicaragua (Notimex)	2
Panama (Notimex)	1
Venezuela (Notimex)	1

=== Year-end charts ===
Chart (2005)	Position
Venezuela Pop/Rock (Record Report)	37

== Certifications and sales ==
Certifications and sales for "Ángel"
Region	Certification	Certified units/sales
Mexico (AMPROFON) Ringtone	Gold	10,000^{*}
^{*} Sales figures based on certification alone.
