= Vivir (song) =

Single by Belinda

from the album Belinda
- Released: June 28, 2004
- Recorded: 2003
- Genre: Pop rock
- Length: 3:03
- Label: Sony International
- Songwriters: Gustav "Grizzly" Jonsson, Marcus "Mack" Sepehrmanesh, Tommy Tysper, Maurice Stern, Belinda
- Producer: Mauri Stern

Belinda singles chronology
"Ángel" (2004)	"Vivir" (2004)	"No Entiendo" (2004)

Audio
- "Vivir" on YouTube

"Vivir" (Live) is the fourth single of Belinda's debut studio album Belinda.

== Information ==
The song served as the theme for the telenovela Corazones al límite (in which she would also act for a short time), and quickly gained airplay in the charts. The acoustic version was included on the CD soundtrack from Corazones al límite. The song received a nomination for Best Musical Theme at the 2005 TVyNovelas Awards.

=== Track list ===
Mexican CD Single/Promo

1. Vivir
2. Vivir (Acoustic Version)

== Music video ==
The music video was directed by Alejandro Lozano and released in September 2004. The video shows a couple sleeping. Then Belinda comes to the couple's room and puts wires of guitars and microphones in 2 speakers. While she is singing, a lot of things like a vase fall onto the floor and break.

== Awards ==
Year	Award	Category	Result
2005	23rd TVyNovelas Awards	Best Musical Theme	Nominated

== Charts ==
Chart (2005)	Peak position
Colombia (ASINCOL)	8

== Kalomoira cover ==
The Greek-American singer Kalomoira recorded the song in 2004, under the name "Someday", for her self-titled debut studio album.
