= Belinda Peregrín =

Mexican singer-songwriter and actress (born 1989)

- Belinda in 2021
- Born: Belinda Peregrín Schüll; 15 August 1989 (age 37) (Note: While Belinda on her own website and other sources give a birth year of 1992, the date of birth on Belinda's immigration status CURP indicates 1989, among others.); Madrid, Spain
- Other name: Beli Bélica
- Citizenship: Mexico; Spain
- Occupations: Singer-songwriter; actress
- Years active: 2000–present
- Musical career
- Origin: Mexico City, Mexico
- Genres: Latin pop; pop rock; dance-pop; electropop; corridos coquette
- Instrument: Vocals
- Labels: BMG Mexico; EMI Televisa; Capitol Latin; Warner Latina
- Website: belinda.com

Belinda Peregrín Schüll (born 15 August 1989), known mononymously as Belinda, is a Mexican singer-songwriter and actress. She immigrated with her family to Mexico City at the age of four. In 2000, she started her career as a child actress at the age of 10 when she was cast as the lead role in the Mexican children's telenovela Amigos x siempre. She later appeared in Aventuras en el tiempo (2001) and Cómplices Al Rescate (2002).

Belinda's self-titled debut studio album, Belinda (2003), was a commercial success, selling over 1.1 million copies worldwide. The album spawned many successful singles, including her debut hit single "Lo Siento" and "Vivir", the main theme of the 2004 telenovela Corazones al límite. Following her departure from Sony BMG and management in 2005, Belinda's second album Utopía (2006) earned her two Latin Grammy Awards nominations and was certified platinum in Mexico. It contained the top-ten singles "Ni Freud ni tu mamá", "Bella Traición" and "Luz Sin Gravedad".

Belinda has also appeared in motion pictures, including the Disney Channel Original Movie The Cheetah Girls 2 (2006), and has dubbed voice roles for The Tale of Despereaux (2008) and Las aventuras de Tadeo Jones (2012). Her return to Mexican telenovelas in Camaleones (2009) and the TV series Mujeres asesinas 3 (2010), inspired her subsequent third album Carpe Diem (2010), which spawned the hit single "Egoísta". Her fourth album Catarsis (2013), debuted at number-one in her native Mexico, and was preceded by the hit singles "En El Amor Hay Que Perdonar" and "En La Obscuridad". In 2017, Belinda appeared in the film Baywatch, starring Dwayne Johnson and Zac Efron.

Together, Belinda four studio albums, singles and soundtracks has sold over 3 million copies making her the third best-selling female Mexican act. The international press have named her the "Princess of Latin Pop".

As of 2020, Belinda is one of the coaches of the Mexican singing competition show, La Voz on TV Azteca after being acquired from Televisa after 7 seasons.

== Early life ==
Belinda, born in 1989 in Madrid, Spain, is the daughter of Ignacio Peregrín Gutiérrez, a Spanish father, and Belinda Schüll Moreno, whose heritage is French-Spanish with partial German blood. Her maternal grandfather, Pierre Schüll, achieved renown as a celebrated French bullfighter, contributing to the storied tradition of bullfighting. Belinda's familial unit extends to include a younger brother named Ignacio, whose birth took place in Mexico City in 1996. Additionally, her paternal lineage is characterized by her father's ownership of multiple medical products factories throughout Europe, reflecting a legacy of entrepreneurial pursuits. At the age of four, Belinda's family made a permanent relocation to Mexico City, a pivotal juncture that marked the beginning of her upbringing within the city's bustling cultural milieu. This early environment laid the groundwork for Belinda's subsequent trajectory within the entertainment sphere.

== Career ==
=== 2000–2002: Telenovelas and Latin breakthrough ===
At age 10, Belinda was cast in her first telenovela, ¡Amigos x Siempre!, produced by Televisa in Mexico, and she was featured on the soundtrack. Both show and album became huge successes in Latin America. In 2001 she starred in her second telenovela named Aventuras en el Tiempo, also produced by Televisa. The series achieved success in Mexico and many Latin-American countries. She contributed to the series soundtracks. She gained recognition playing twins in Cómplices Al Rescate. She toured with the cast in many Latin-American countries with over 160 live shows. She recorded two soundtracks for the series and received her first Latin Grammy nomination for her work on one of the soundtracks. She didn't return for the series' second season.

=== 2003–2005: Belinda and commercial success ===
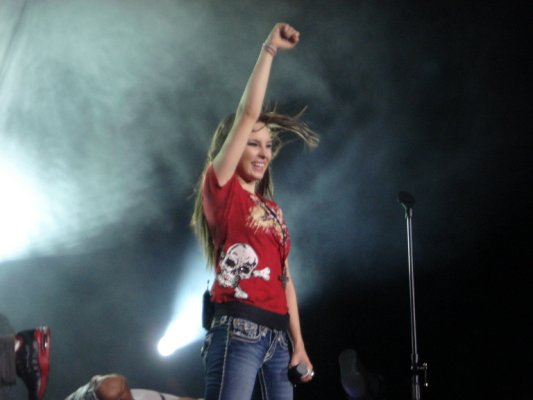
Belinda performed at the Auditorio Citibanamex in Monterrey, Nuevo León, during her Utopía tour.

Belinda's self-titled debut studio album, Belinda, was internationally released in Mexico by Sony BMG and RCA Records, on August 5, 2003. Garnering significant acclaim and commercial success, the album achieved widespread popularity throughout Mexico and Latin America, selling over half a million copies worldwide. The production of the album "Belinda" was helmed by a team of accomplished producers, including Rudy Pérez, Graeme Pleeth, Mauri Stern, and Robin Barter. Their collaborative efforts contributed to the sonic landscape and success of the album, showcasing their diverse expertise and musical prowess. Six singles were released from the album, among which "Lo Siento", "Boba Niña Nice", "Ángel", and "Vivir" attained positions in the top ten charts. "Vivir" notably served as the main theme song for the soap opera "Corazones al límite," in which Belinda made a brief appearance. Additionally, the album underwent multiple re-releases during the years 2004 and 2005, further extending its reach and commercial impact.

In early 2005, Belinda collaborated with the Mexican rock band Moderatto on a cover of the Timbiriche song titled "Muriendo Lento." This collaboration soared to the top of the charts in Mexico, claiming the No. 1 spot, and proved to be a commercial triumph, further solidifying Belinda's presence in the music industry.

=== 2006–2008: Crossover, The Cheetah Girls 2 and Utopía ===
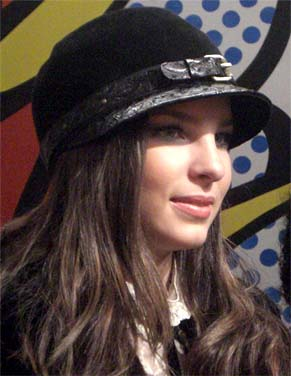
Belinda in 2007

In 2006, Belinda debuted in the North American markets where she makes her film debut in the Disney Channel Original Movie The Cheetah Girls 2 as Marisol. The movie premiered on 25 August 2006 with a total of over 8.1 million viewers, one of the highest rated television films the network has released. Belinda also contributed 4 songs to Soundtrack, which was released on 15 August 2006 and debuted at No. 5 on the Billboard 200 and sold 1.4 million copies to date in the US.

Belinda's second studio album, Utopía, was released in late 2006 and peaked at No. 3 on the Mexican charts, selling over 1 million records worldwide; and included the hit single "Ni Freud Ni Tu Mamá" (2006). Belinda revealed that her label wanted her to spend a week in Los Angeles for the recording of Utopía 2 an English CD/DVD re-release for European and North American countries. She also guest-starred in Buscando a Timbiriche, La Nueva Banda. On 18 October 2007, Belinda won 2 awards, "Video of the Year" for "Bella Traición", and "Best Solo Artist" at the MTV Video Music Awards Latinoamerica. She was also nominated in two categories in the 2007 Latin Grammy Awards held on 8 November: "Song of the Year" for "Bella Traición", and "Best Female Pop Album" for her hit album Utopía.

Belinda provided vocals for the Spanglish remix of "Te Quiero" by DJ Flex and Finley's 2008 single Your Hero.

=== 2009–2010: Return to Mexican television and Carpe Diem ===
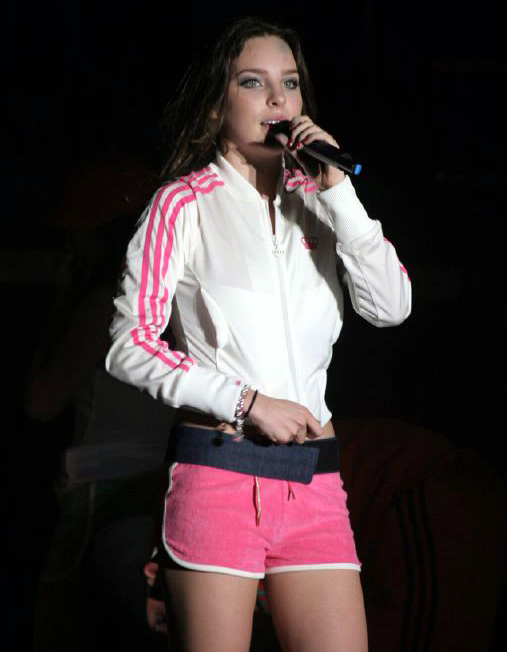
Belinda performing in Nicaragua, 2007

In 2009, Belinda starred alongside Alfonso Herrera and Edith González in the action-themed telenovela, Camaleones. On 27 August 2009 EMI Televisa posted a video teaser of her new song "Sal de Mi Piel", originally announced as the lead single of her yet-untitled third studio album; it was then selected as the main theme of Camaleones. In 2010 she guest-starred on the third season of Mujeres Asesinas, starring in the episode "Anette and Anne, noble", based on the story of the painter Sofia Bassi, in which she shared credits with Issabella Camil and William Levy. She also recorded the song "Contigo en la distancia" for one of the scenes. The episode and song were praised by critics; the episode was one of the series' highest rated.

In February and March 2010, Belinda was featured in collaboration with several Latin artists in "Somos el Mundo" and "Ay Haiti". Both songs were released as charity singles for benefits.

Carpe Diem, Belinda's third studio album, was released on 23 March 2010. Two days after its release, the album was certified gold in Mexico after 40,000 copies were sold. The lead single of the record Egoísta featuring Pitbull was released to commercial success; A shift from her prominent pop-rock genre to more dance oriented. The album's second and final single is "Dopamina" was released in 2011 to moderate success. The video for Dopamina was released on 2 February 2011. Belinda also stated on her Facebook that she was putting the final touches on her next two videos for the tracks; Gaia and Amor Transgénico which were never released.

=== 2011–2015: Catarsis, collaborations and Catarsis Tour ===
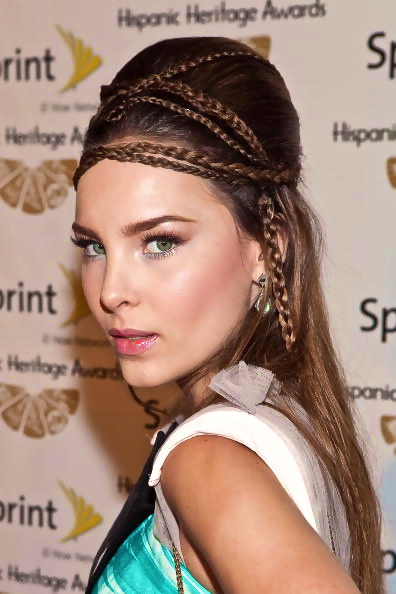
Belinda in 2011

Belinda announced that she would dedicate 2011 and 2012 to writing and recording for her new album. On 5 June 2012, "En El Amor Hay Que Perdonar" was confirmed as the album's lead single. It was officially released for digital download on 19 June 2012. On 21 July, five tracks from the album were leaked online, including next single "I Love You (Te Quiero)" featuring Pitbull alongside "Bailaría Sobre El Fuego", "Litost", "Aguardiente", "Como Si Fuéramos Novios", "Dame Mas", and "Con Los Ojos Cerrados".

"En El Amor Hay Que Perdonar" debuted at number seven on the Mexican Singles Chart and peaked at number one, and stayed for one week. Although not an official single from the album, "Te Voy A Esperar" (which features Juan Magán), for the soundtrack of the film Las aventuras de Tadeo Jones was digitally released in Spain, debuting and staying at number one for ten weeks, receiving the Platinum certification by PROMUSICAE for sales of over 60,000, and was included as a bonus track on the Latin American editions of the album. In Mexico, "Te Voy A Esperar" was only released for airplay and peaked at number seven. Catarsis was originally scheduled to be released on 25 September 2012. However, it was pushed back and was released on 2 July 2013.

"En la Obscuridad" was released as the second single, it debuted at No. 37 on the Mexican Singles Chart, peaking at number 10, in March 2013. It had an international impact for Belinda's career, peaking at No. 39 in Spain and at No. 65 in South Korea. In just two days, the video broke the Latin music record on VEVO, with more than 3 million views.

Belinda embarked on the Catarsis Tour starting in August 2013. Featuring a much bigger production than her past tours, the concert tour lasted almost three years ending in mid 2016 which also saw the singer visiting various festivals throughout Latin America. The tour also saw various "phases" and saw changes to the stage, backdrops, and wardrobes. Most notably there was the "Kastle Ghost Koncept" phase that included a castle set up on the stage and famous singers appearing on stage. Later that year Belinda collaborated with Mexican Rock Band Motel on their song "Sueño de Ti" which was released as the second single from their fourth album Prisma.

=== 2016–2022: Film work, shoe line and upcoming fifth album ===
In March 2016, it was announced that Belinda would be an extra in Baywatch, the film adaptation of the 90's television show of the same name that stars Zac Efron and Dwayne Johnson. In June of the same year Belinda was announced as part of the Spanish adaptation of the film Trolls and its 2020 sequel Trolls World Tour, lending her voice to the character Poppy.

Apart from film work, Belinda debuted a line of shoes, a collaboration with Capa de Ozono, in July 2016, which officially released in fall of that year.

In between the completion of the Catarsis Tour, film work, and her shoe line, Belinda announced she was in the songwriting process for her fifth album. She posted a preview of a ballad on her social media in May 2016 and promised her new album will fit perfectly into her discography, leading fans to believe she will return to the earlier sound of her first two albums Belinda and Utopía. With the start of 2017 the singer revealed that American DJ Steve Aoki was working on her album and shared several videos of the two working together in the studio. On 27 April 2017 she confirmed the lead single of her fifth album to be titled "Bailalo" which was produced by Aoki and was scheduled to be featured in the song's accompanying music video directed and produced by Criss Angel which was never released to the public. However, on February 27, 2020, the music video and audio of the song were leaked on the internet and became the trending topic to all of her fans, though the song is yet to be released on digital platforms. Still focusing on work for her fifth album, Belinda was forced to postpone the shooting of two music videos in Spain due to the COVID-19 pandemic and the cancellation of all flights for that country. One of the songs features Spanish singer Juan Magán, who she has previously collaborated with in past projects. Belinda finally talked about the leaking of her music video "Bailalo", describing it as "a video full of colors, talent and Cirque du Soleil in Las Vegas".

=== 2023–present: New record label contract and upcoming fifth album ===
On 7 August 2023, Belinda announced via her social medias the return to music career and new label contract Warner Music Group. On 17 January 2024, she teased the poster of her song "Cactus", which was released on 31 January. It is mainly aimed at her ex-partner, Christian Nodal, and serves as the lead single of her upcoming fifth album Indómita.

In 2025, Belinda collaborated with the Pinoy pop girl group Bini for a remix of the latter's single "Blink Twice", which was released on March 14.

== Other works and business ==
Belinda founded her own music promotion company called Joy Music. Joy Music promotes concert tours and several independent albums.

Belinda and her younger brother opened a luxury karaoke bar, La Chismosa Canta Bar (The Gossip sing and bar), in Mexico. The bar serves high-class alcohol and is modeled after the glitz and glamour of the Roaring Twenties. As of 2016, La Chismosa Canta Bar has three locations in Mexico.

Belinda has done several modelling assignments and has been the face of multiple brands.

- "Cómplices al rescate" puzzle games (2002).
- Froot Loops (2002).
- Oscar Mayer (2002).
- Zapatos Andrea (2003–2005).
- Office Depot (2003–2007).
- Twister Moves (2004)
- VideoNow (2004)
- Vianney (2004–2007).
- Hasbro (2005)
- LG telephones (2005).
- Coca-Cola (2005)
- Rockola Coca-Cola (2005–2007).
- Kbzónicos dolls(2005).
- Tooth Tunes (2007)
- Coca-Cola Zero (2007–2009).
- Cinemex (2009)
- Asepxia (2013)
- FIAT (2013)
- Herbal Essences (2014)
- Magnum (2014–2015)
- StudioF México (2015-2016)
- Cartier (2017)

== Personal life ==
Belinda began dating Mexican singer Christian Nodal in 2020, whom she met while working together on La Voz. They announced their engagement in May 2021, which took place in a restaurant in Barcelona. In February 2022, Nodal announced their separation.

== Discography ==
Studio albums

- Belinda (2003)
- Utopía (2006)
- Carpe Diem (2010)
- Catarsis (2013)
- Indómita (2025)

== Tours ==
=== Headlining ===
- Belinda Tour 2002 (2002–2003)
- Tour Fiesta en la Azotea (2004–2005)
- Tour Utopía (2007–2008)
- Tour Catarsis (2014–2017)
- Libertad: Bailala! Tour (2022-2024)

2022
Date	City	Country	Venue
October 11	Guadalajara	Mexico	Coliseo Centenario
October 28	Tijuana	Mexico	El Trompo
2023
Date	City	Country	Venue
February 17	Mexico City	Mexico	Parque Bicentenario
April 1	Tampico	Mexico	Teatro del Pueblo (Feria de Tampico)
April 20	Aguascalientes	Mexico	Foro de las Estrellas (Feria Nacional de San Marcos)
May 18	Chihuahua	Mexico	Teatro del Pueblo
September 2	Rosemont	United States	Rosemont Theater
September 28	Pachuca	Mexico	Teatro del Pueblo (Feria de Pachuca)
December 13	Calvillo	Mexico	Teatro del Pueblo
2024
Date	City	Country	Venue

=== Promotional ===
- Rockola Coca-Cola 2007 (2007)
- Carpe Diem Promo Tour (2010–2011)

== Filmography ==
=== Film ===
Year	Title	Role	Notes	Refs.
2006	The Cheetah Girls 2	Marisol Duran	Disney Channel Original Movie	
2008	The Tale of Despereaux	Princess Pea	Voice role (Latin American dub)	
2012	Tad, The Lost Explorer	Sara Lavrof	Voice role (Latin American dub)	
2016	Trolls	Poppy	Voice role (Latin American dub)	
2017	Baywatch	Carmen		
2020	Trolls World Tour	Poppy	Voice role (Latin American dub)	
2021	My Little Pony: A New Generation	Sunny Starscout	Voice role (Latin American dub)	
2026	Toy Story 5	Lilypad	Voice role (Latin American dub)	

=== Television ===
Year		Role	Notes	Refs.
2000	Amigos x siempre	Ana Capistrán Vidal	Lead role	
2001	Aventuras en el tiempo	Violeta Arcángel Flores	Lead role	
2002	Cómplices Al Rescate	Mariana Cantú / Silvana del Valle Ontiveros	Lead role	
2004	Corazones al límite	Elena "Elenita" Arellano Gómez	Recurring role	
2007	Patito Feo	Herself	Guest star	
2009–10	Camaleones	Valentina Izaguirre	Lead role	
2010	Mujeres asesinas	Annette VanDiryk	Season 3, episode: "Annette y Ana, Nobles"	
2011	Belinda, Un Reality Sobre Mi Vida	Herself	13 episodes	
2013	El Factor X	Judge	MundoFox	
2019–2020	La Voz	Coach	First time working with TV Azteca	
2019–2021	La Voz Senior	Coach		
2021	La Voz Kids	Coach		
2022–2023	Welcome to Eden	Africa		
2024	Who Killed Him?	Paola Duarte		
2025	Mentiras, la serie	Daniela	Main role	
