= List of songs recorded by Belinda =

Belinda is a Mexican singer and actress. Her music career started in 2000 when she contributed vocals to the soundtrack albums for the Mexican telenovela, Amigos x siempre, in which she also starred. In 2003 Belinda Peregrin released her debut album Belinda. Belinda Peregrin has recorded songs for four studio albums, several soundtracks and has collaborated with other artists for duets and featured songs on their respective albums and charity singles.

== Songs ==
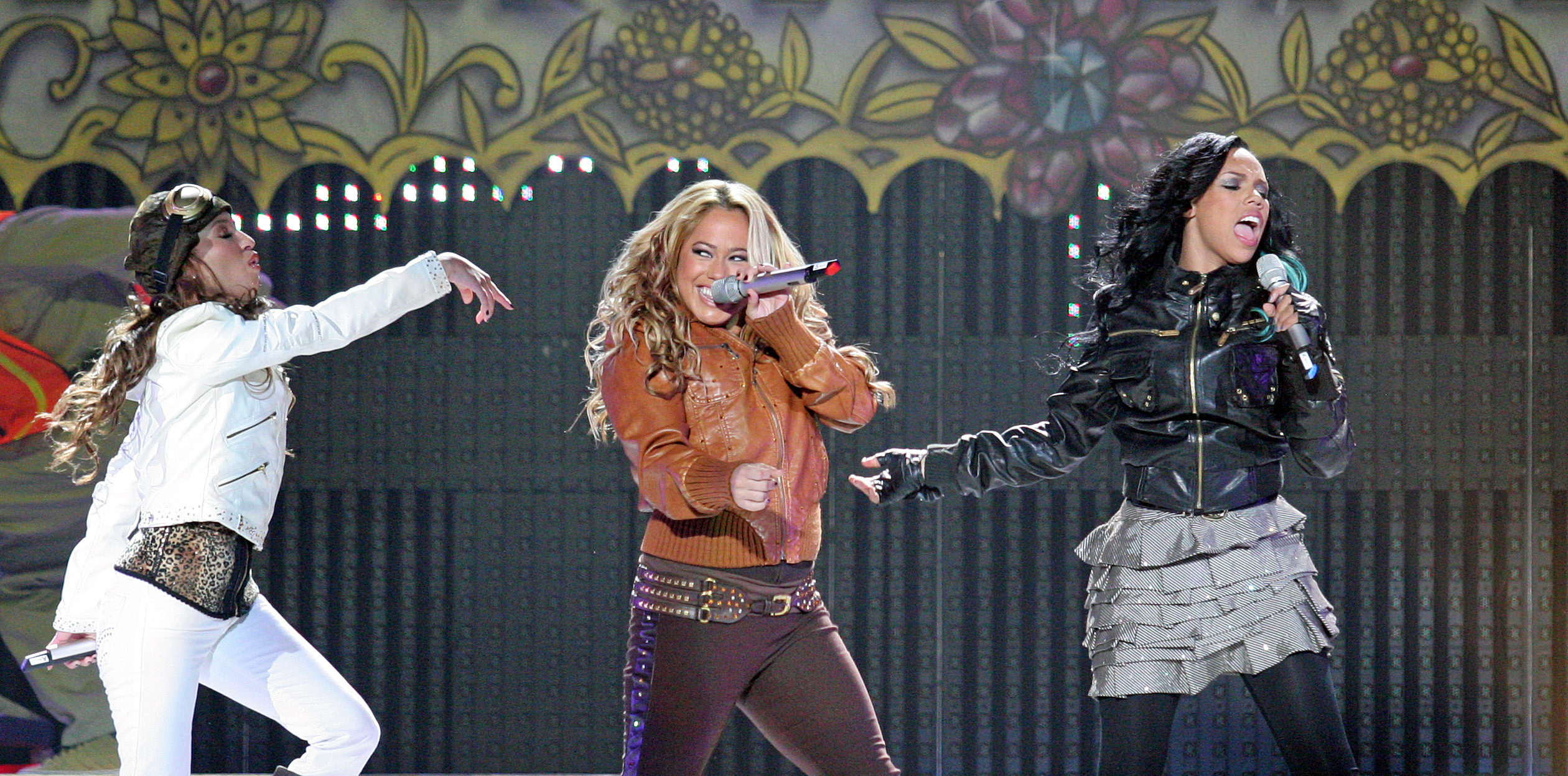
Belinda and The Cheetah Girls recorded two songs together: "Amigas Cheetahs" and "A La Nanita Nana".

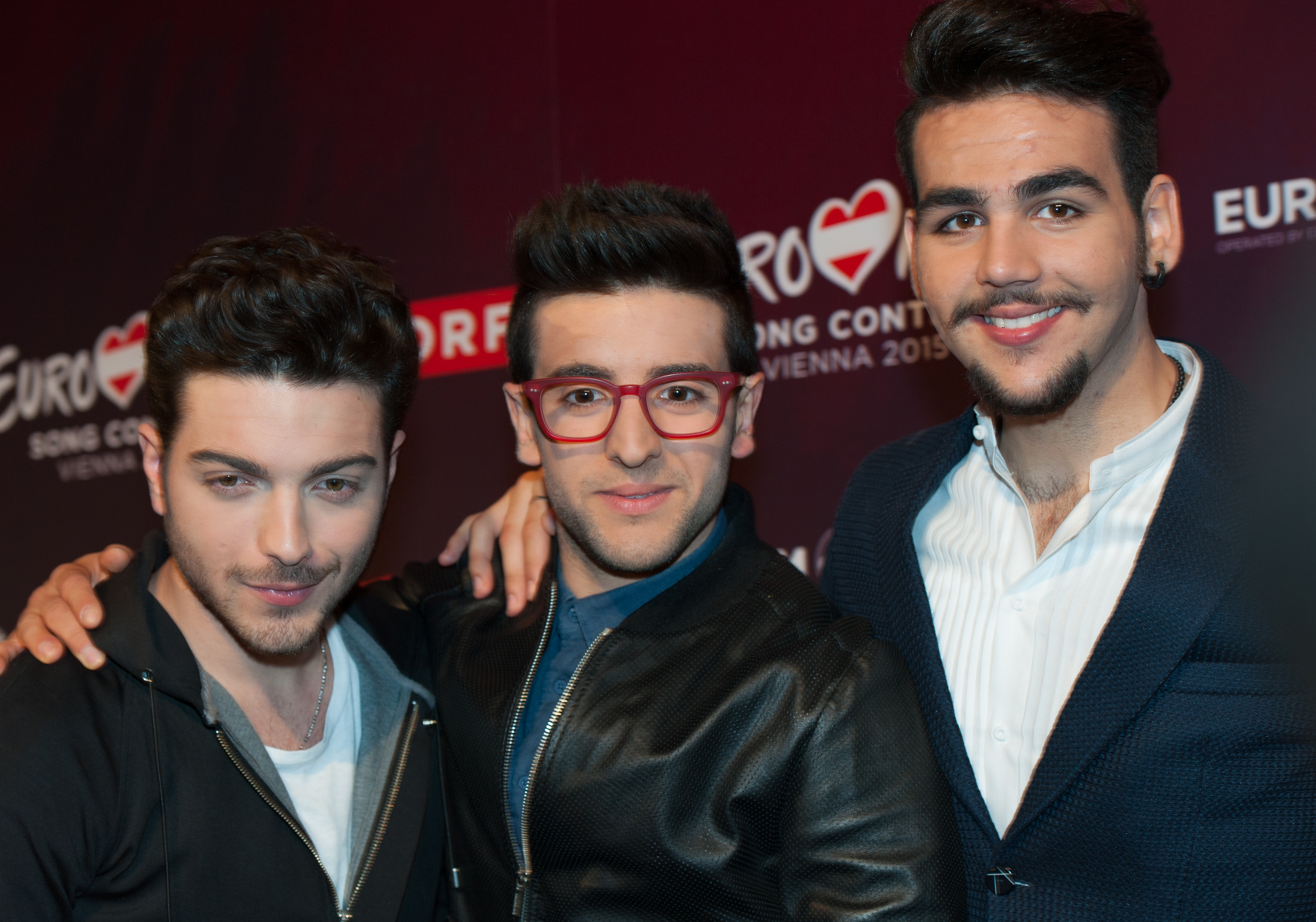
Belinda and Il Volo recorded two songs together: "Constantemente mía" and "Mis Deseos / Feliz Navidad".

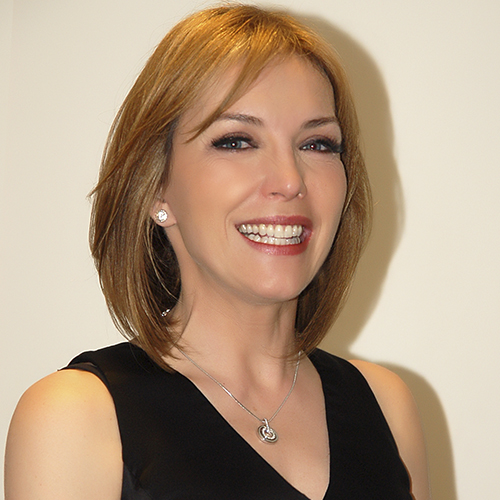
Laura Flores performs on "Contigo Siempre" with Belinda.

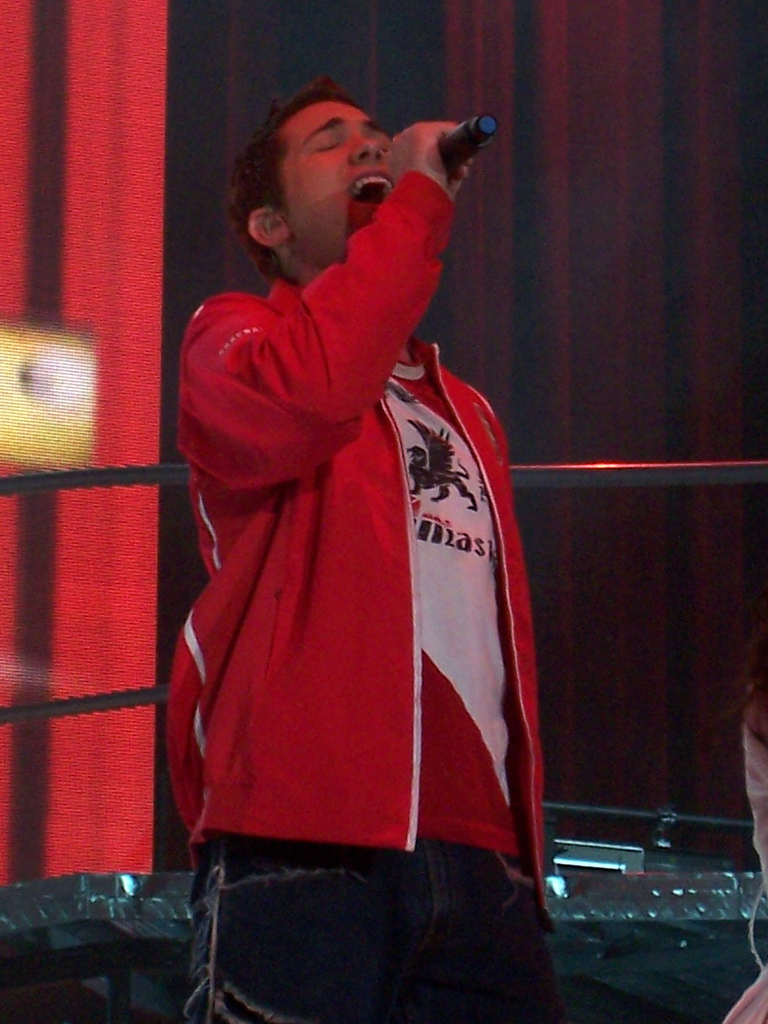
Belinda duetted with Drew Seeley on "Dance With Me".

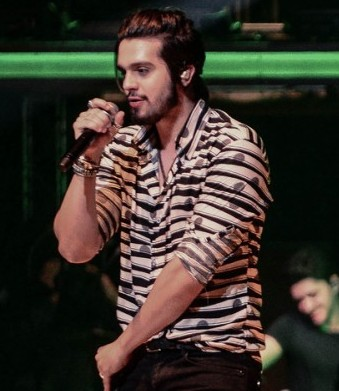
Belinda is featured on "Meu Menino (Minha Menina)" by Luan Santana.

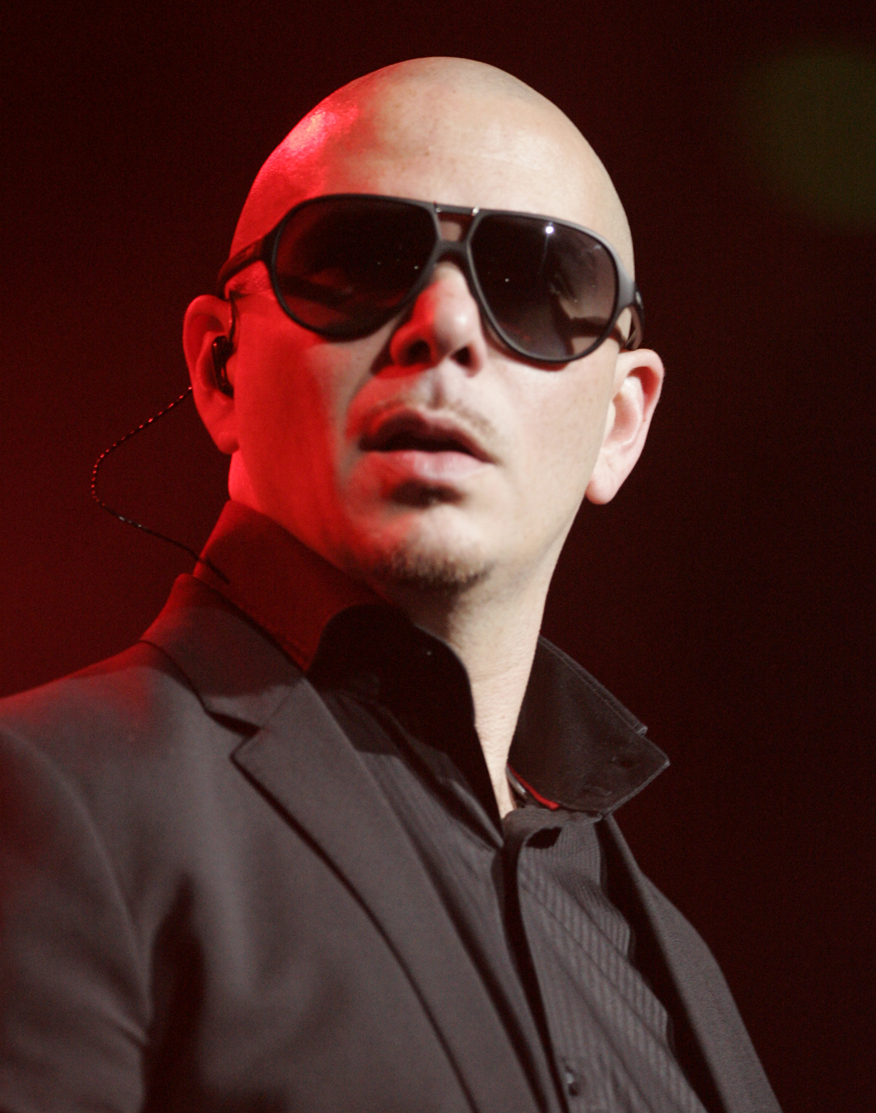
Belinda and Pitbull recorded two songs together: "Egoísta" and "I Love You... Te Quiero".

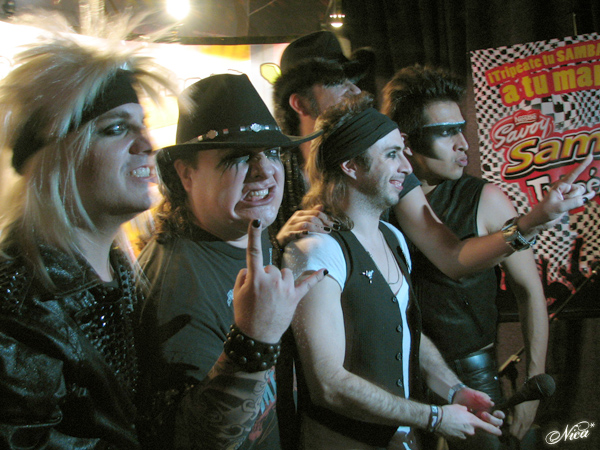
Belinda is featured on "Muriendo lento" by Moderatto.

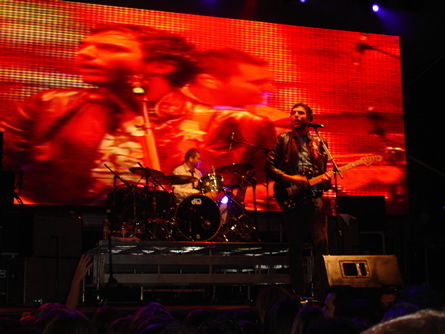
Belinda is featured on "Sueño de ti" by Motel.

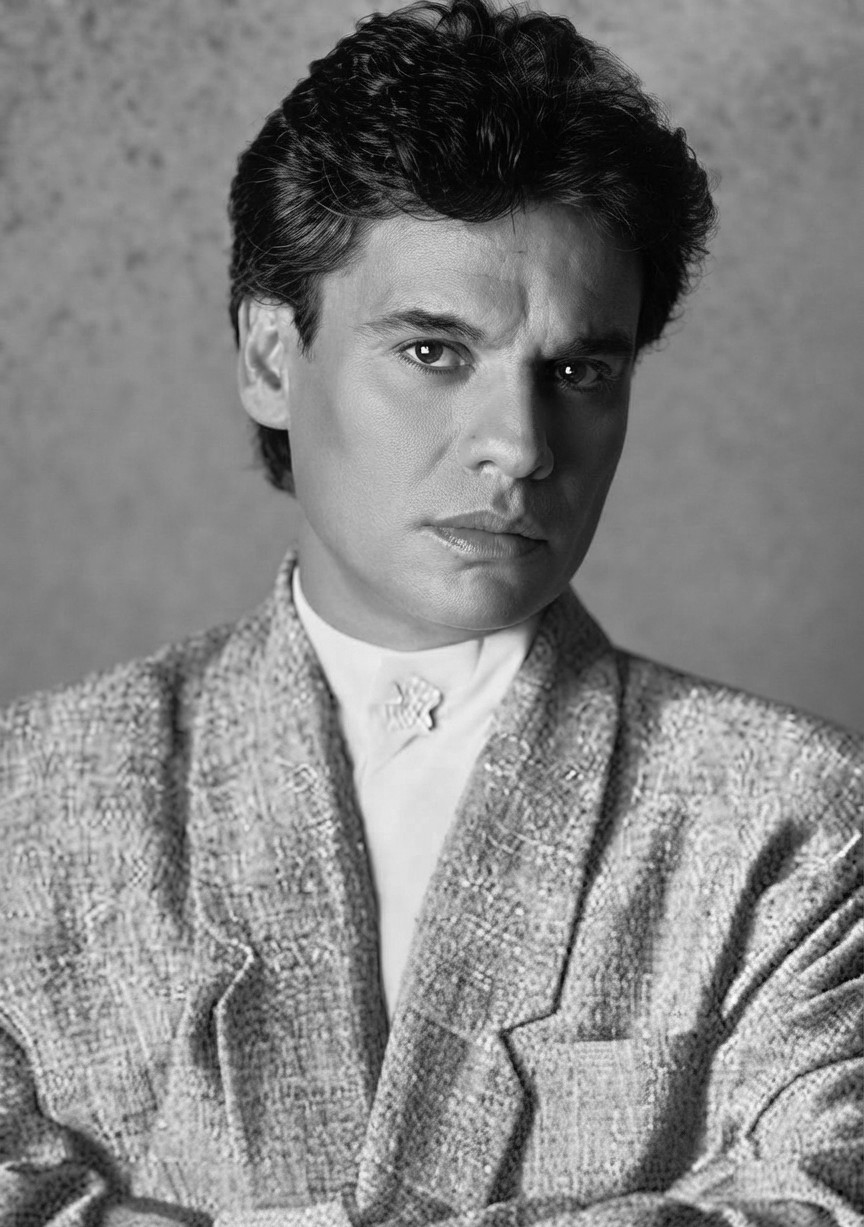
Juan Gabriel re-recorded his song "Te sigo amando" with Belinda in 2015.

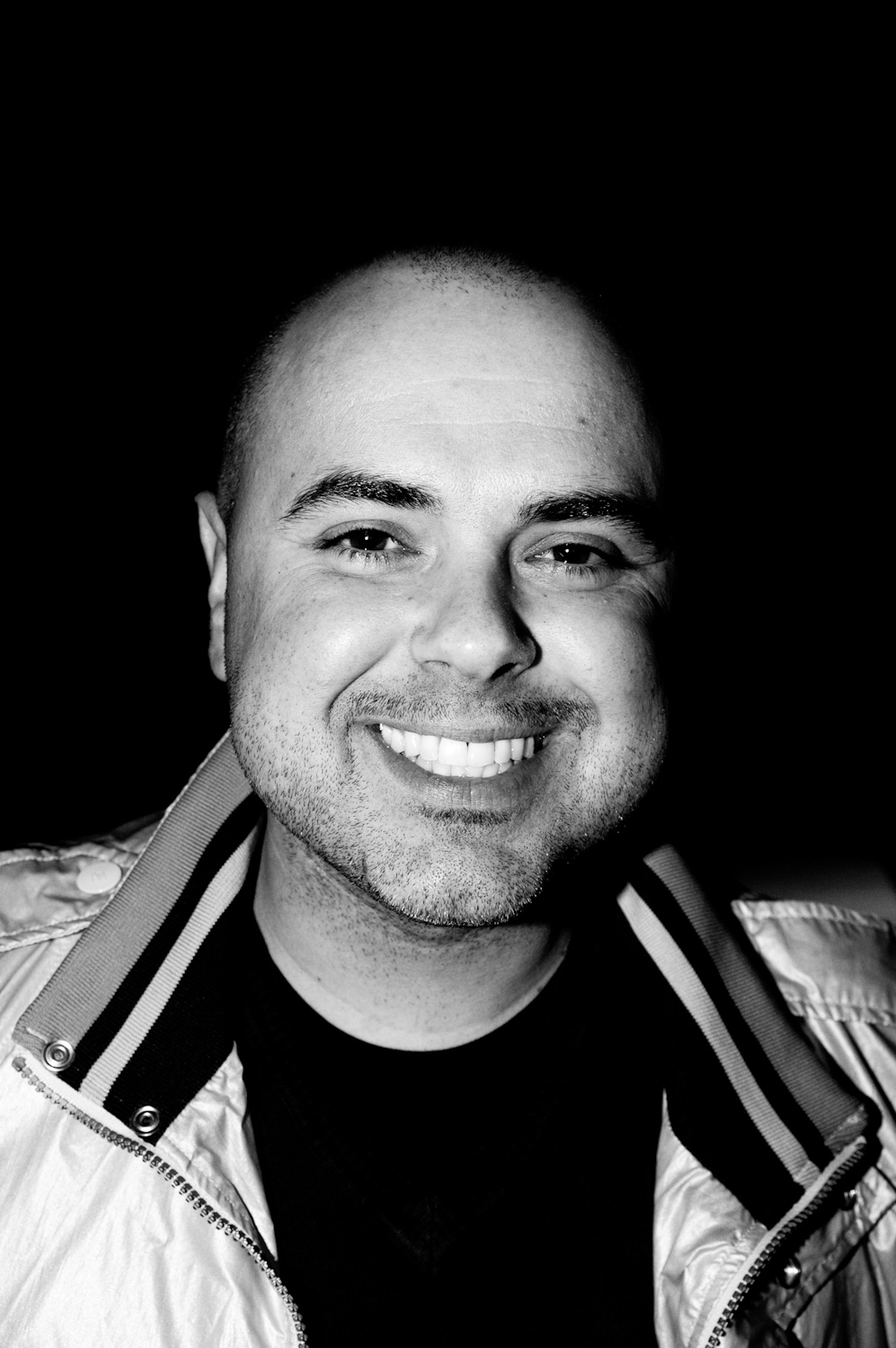
Belinda and Juan Magán recorded four songs together: "Te voy a esperar", "Si no te quisiera", "Déjate llevar" and "Madrid X Marbella".

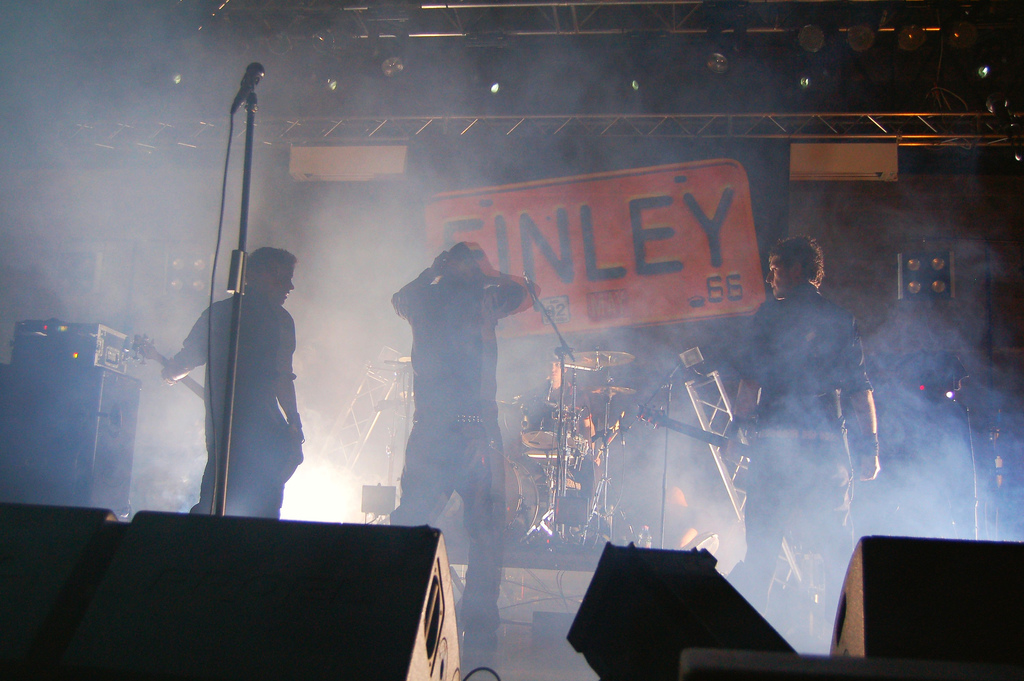
Belinda is featured on "Your Hero" by Finley.

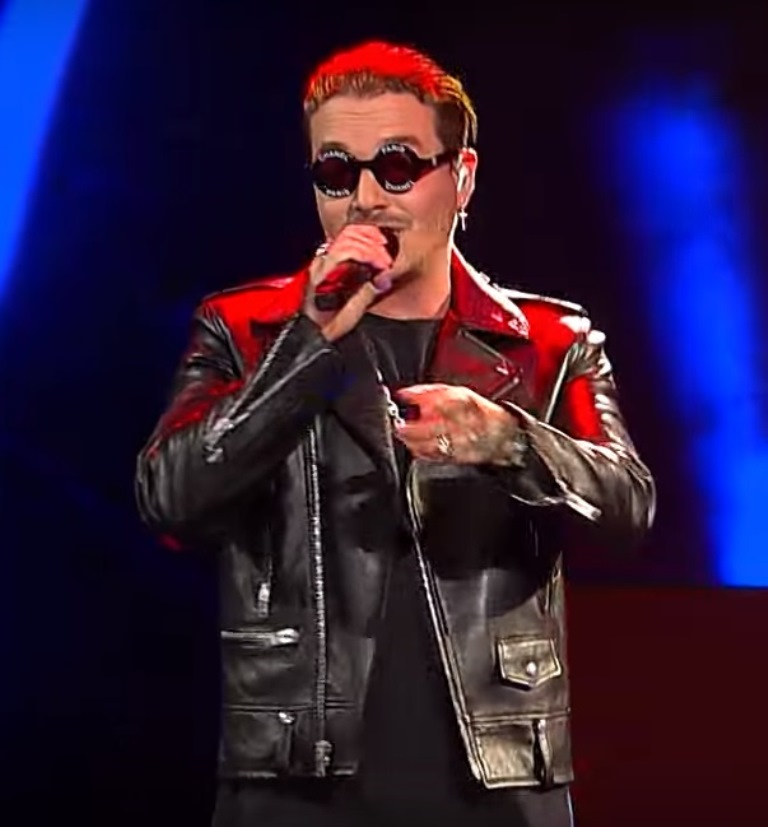
J Balvin collaborated with Belinda and Vein for "Translation".

Key
	Indicates song included on an alternative version of the album
‡	Indicates song written solely by Belinda

Name of song, writers, originating album, and year released.
Song	Artist(s)	Writer(s)	Album	Year	Ref.
"+ Perra + Bitch"	Belinda, Netón Vega	Netón Vega; Belinda Peregrín; O' Neill; Angel Sandoval	Indómita	2025	
"¿Dónde iré yo? (Disposition)"	Belinda	Robert Habolin; Mats Jansson; Marcus "Mack" Sepehrmanesh; Belinda; Mauri Stern; Pichardo González	Belinda	2003	
"¿Quién es feliz?"	Belinda	Belinda; Nacho Peregrín; Lester Mendez; Skye Sweetnam	Utopía	2006	
"300 noches"	Belinda, Natanael Cano	Belinda; Mannel; Natanael Cano; Sara Schell; Whitestar; Angel Sandoval; Luis Jonuel Gonzalez	Indómita	2024 (Note: Released as a digital single on April 25, 2024.)	
"8,000 KM"	Grupo Maximo Grado & Belinda	Belinda Peregrín Schull; Christian Michelle Felix Felix	Somos Leyenda	2025	
"A La Nanita Nana"	The Cheetah Girls feat. Belinda	Traditional (Note: Credited as "Traditional" in the album; however, the composer of the music was José Ramón Gomis, while the author of the lyrics was Juan Francisco Muñoz y Pabón.)	The Cheetah Girls 2	2006	
"Acaríciame, el gato y yo, acaríciame"	Mentiras: La serie, Belinda, Mariana Treviño, Diana Bovio feat. Regina Blandón	Alejandro Jaen Palacios; Anahí Lucrecia Van Zandweghe; Juan Carlos Calderón López de Arróyabe; Miguel Atilio Boccadoro Hernández	Mentiras: La Serie	2025	
"After We Make Love"	Belinda feat. Vein	Belinda Peregrín; Gavriel Aminov; Ignacio Peregrín; Lavi Hoss	Catarsis	2013	
"Alguien más"	Belinda	Belinda; Nacho Peregrín; Kara DioGuardi; Mitch Allan	Utopía	2006	
"Alma gemela"	Belinda	Christina Abaroa; Alejandro Abaroa; Pablo Aguirre	Cómplices Al Rescate: Silvana	2002	
"Amiga mía, ese hombre no se toca"	Mentiras: La serie, Belinda, Regina Blandón	José Ramón García Flórez; Marella Cayre; Horacio Angel Lanzillotta	Mentiras: La Serie	2025	
"Amiga soledad"	Belinda	Belinda; Nacho Peregrín; Lester Mendez; Kay Hanley	Utopía	2006	
"Amigas Cheetahs"	The Cheetah Girls feat. Belinda	Jamie Houston; Will Robinson	The Cheetah Girls 2	2006	
"Amigos, amigos"	Belinda & Christopher	Christina Abaroa; Alejandro Abaroa; Pablo Aguirre	Aventuras en el Tiempo	2001	
"Amigos x siempre"	Belinda & Martín Ricca	Alejandro Abaroa; Jesús Flores "La Bota"	¡Amigos X Siempre!	2000	
"Amor a primera vista"	Los Ángeles Azules, Belinda, Lalo Ebratt feat. Horacio Palencia	Descemer Bueno Martínez; Elías Porfirio Mejía Avante; Horacio Palencia; Belinda Peregrín Schüll	De Buenos Aires para el Mundo	2019 (Note: Initially released as digital single on June 14, 2019 and was later included as a bonus track to the digital edition of Los Ángeles Azules' album De Buenos Aires para el Mundo on August 28, 2020.)	
"Amor primero"	Belinda & Christopher	Alejandro Abaroa; Alejandro Carballo	Aventuras en el Tiempo	2001	
"Amor transgénico"	Belinda	Arno Elias; Belinda; Nacho Peregrín	Carpe Diem	2010	
"Ángel (Once In Your Lifetime)"	Belinda	Graeme Pleeth; Shellie Poole; Belinda; Mauri Stern	Belinda	2003	
"Aries"	Belinda	Angel Sandoval; Belinda Peregrín; Daniel Rondon; Juan Vegas; Julia Lewis	Indómita	2025	
"Aventuras en el tiempo"	Belinda & Christopher	Christina Abaroa; Alejandro Abaroa; Pablo Aguirre	Aventuras en el Tiempo	2001	
"Ay Haití"	Artists for Haiti (Note: Hombres G, Najwa, Alejandro Sanz, Miguel Bosé, Shakira, Zahara, Carlos Jean, Enrique Iglesias, Juanes, Macaco, Marta Sánchez, La Oreja de Van Gogh, Estopa, Belinda, Annie B Sweet, Sergio "Kun" Agüero, Aleks Syntek, La Mala Rodríguez, Daddy Jean, José Mercé, Sandra Carrasco, Wally López, David Otero, OBK.)	Alejandro Sanz; Aleks Syntek; Bebe; Carlos Jean; David Summers; Estopa; Juanes; Macaco; La Mala Rodríguez; Najwa	Non-album single (Note: A charity single recorded to benefit the victims of the January 12, 2010 Haiti earthquake.)	2010	
"Bailalo"	Belinda ft Steve Aoki, Zion & Lennox	Steven Hiroyuki Aoki; Belinda Peregrín Schüll	Non-album promotional single (Note: The official video was exclusively released through the official JME Records channel on YouTube, followed by the audio on Belinda's official channel.)	2020 (Note: A 10-second preview for the song was released on Belinda's official Instagram account on March 27, 2017, announcing its upcoming release as her single. However, just the full video was not officially released until February 27, 2020.)	
"Bailaría sobre el fuego"	Belinda	Belinda Peregrín; Gavriel Aminov; Ignacio Peregrín; Lavi Hoss	Catarsis	2013	
"Be Free"	Belinda	Belinda	Belinda	2003	
"Bella traición"	Belinda	Belinda; Nacho Peregrín; Kara DioGuardi; Mitch Allan	Utopía	2006	
"Blink Twice" (Dos Veces Remix)	BINI, Belinda	Amanda Ratchford; Pontus Kalm; Marqueze Parker; Pacific-Joshua Zagabe; Steven Franks; Darius Coleman; Anna Achacoso-Graham	Blink Twice (Single Pack)	2025	
"Boba niña nice (Teenage Superstar)"	Belinda	Daniel Gibson; Jörgen Ringqvist; Belinda; Mauri Stern	Belinda	2003	
"Boss Rmx"	Emjay, Belinda	Belinda; María José de la Torre; Sara Schell; Julia Lewis	Me estoy volviendo loca	2025	
"Bugatti"	Belinda	Belinda Peregrín; Bongani Gaone Sehunelo; Daniel Esteban Gutiérrez Lopera; Daniel Ignacio Rondon; Jonathan Adams Mills; Mara Alejandra Castillo Valdez; Nathaniel Powers; Maria Vertiz; Alan Vega	TBA	2024	
"Cactus"	Belinda	Belinda Peregrín; José Pérez; Starlin Rivas Batista; Luis Jonuel Gonzalez; Jared Ahedo	Indómita	2024 (Note: Released as a digital single on January 31, 2024.)	
"Canción para regresar"	Sebastián Yatra, Lucho RK, Belinda, Gente de Zona	Sebastián Yatra; Angel Arce; Emilio Roca Cáceres; Joaquín Domínguez Santana "Juacko"; Alexander Delgado; Randy Malcom Martínez; Belinda Peregrín Schull	TBA	2025	
"Castillos"	Mentiras: La serie, Belinda, Mariana Treviño, Diana Bovio feat. Regina Blandón	Anahí Lucrecia Van Zandweghe; Miguel Atilio Boccadoro Hernández	Mentiras: La Serie	2025	
"Colorblind"	Belinda	Antonina Armato; Samantha Ashley Derosa; Kara Jillian Madden; Cory Nitta; Belinda Peregrín Schüll; Timothy James Price; Reid Stefanick	Non-album single (Note: For the Spanish Netflix series Welcome to Eden.)	2022	
"Como si fuéramos novios"	Belinda	Belinda Peregrín; Víctor Martínez; Ignacio Peregrín; Joan M. Ortíz; José M. Gómez Martínez; Gavriel Aminov	Catarsis	2013	
"Cómplices al rescate"	Belinda, Fabián & the Cómplices	Christina Abaroa; Alejandro Abaroa; Pablo Aguirre	Cómplices Al Rescate: Silvana (Note: Grupera version.); Cómplices Al Rescate: Mariana (Note: Pop version.)	2002	
"Constantemente mía"	Il Volo feat. Belinda	Diane Warren; Edgar Cortázar; Mark Portmann	Más Que Amor	2013	
"Contigo o sin ti"	Belinda	Belinda; Karen Juantorena; Daniel McKinney; Krista Gonzales; Kobe Eshun	Utopía	2006	
"Contigo siempre"	Belinda & Laura Flores	Christina Abaroa; Alejandro Abaroa; Pablo Aguirre	Cómplices Al Rescate: Silvana	2002	
"Cuando baja la marea"	Mentiras: La serie, Belinda, Mariana Treviño, Diana Bovio feat. Regina Blandón	Consuelo Arango Bustos; Marella Cayre	Mentiras: La Serie	2025	
"Cuestión de tiempo"	Belinda & Adriana Fonseca	Christina Abaroa; Alejandro Abaroa; Pablo Aguirre	¡Amigos X Siempre!	2000	
"Cuida de mí"	Belinda	Carlos Jean; Belinda; Nacho Peregrín	Carpe Diem	2010	
"Culpable"	Belinda	Andrea Wasse; Lincoln Cushman; Ryan Ford; Jay Westman; Belinda; Nacho Peregrín	Carpe Diem	2010	
"Cursi de +"	Belinda	Angel Sandoval; Belinda Peregrín; Roberto Zamudio; Yann C	Indómita	2025	
"Dame más"	Belinda	Belinda Peregrín; Gavriel Aminov; Ignacio Peregrín; Paolo Prudencio	Catarsis	2013	
"Dame una seña"	Belinda	Christina Abaroa; Alejandro Abaroa; Pablo Aguirre	Aventuras en el Tiempo	2001	
"Dance With Me"	Drew Seeley feat. Belinda	Ray Cham; Charlene Licera	The Cheetah Girls 2	2006	
"De color de rosa"	Mentiras: La serie, Belinda	Silvia Tapia Alcázar	Mentiras: La Serie	2025	
"De niña a mujer"	Belinda	Christina Abaroa; Alejandro Abaroa; Pablo Aguirre	Aventuras en el Tiempo	2001	
"De nuevo el amor"	Belinda & Ramiro Torres	Christina Abaroa; Alejandro Abaroa; Pablo Aguirre	Cómplices Al Rescate: Silvana	2002	
"De qué te vale fingir"	Mentiras: La serie, Belinda, Mariana Treviño, Diana Bovio feat. Regina Blandón	Manuel Pacho González; Rosa Salcedo Vareda; Sérgio Antônio Sá de Albuquerque; Vanusa Santos Flores	Mentiras: La Serie	2025	
"Death Note"	Belinda	Belinda Peregrín; Jota Rosa	Indómita	2025	
"Debo saber"	Belinda	Megan Cavallari; Rob Hudnut; Amy Powers	Barbie como la Princesa de la Isla (Note: The official music video for the song "Debo Saber" was released exclusively on a limited edition DVD bundled with the movie Barbie como la Princesa de la Isla.)	2007	
"Déjame vivir"	Martín Ricca & Belinda	Juan Gabriel	¡Amigos x Siempre! en la Ruta de la Amistad	2000	
"Déjate llevar"	Juan Magán, Belinda, Manuel Turizo, Snova & B-Case	Vito Kobach; Juan Manuel Magán González; Juan Diego Medina Vélez; Marcos Peralta Suero; Julián Turizo Zapata; Manuel Turizo Zapata; Nico Wellenbrink; Matthias Zurkler	4.0	2017 (Note: The song was originally released as a digital single on November 18, 2017, and later included on Juan Magán's album 4.0 on June 19, 2019.)	
"Desesperada"	3Ball MTY feat. Belinda	Antonio Hernández Luna; Luciano Luna; Erick Rincón; América Sierra	Globall	2014	
"Desesperada"	Marta Sánchez feat. Belinda	Austin Roberts; Stephen M. Singer; Carlos Toro Montoro	De Par en Par	2010	
"Detrás de mi ventana"	Mentiras: La serie, Belinda	Ricardo Arjona	Mentiras: La Serie	2025	
"Dime si es amor" (Note: In the iTunes edition, the song is listed as "Esto es amor.")	Belinda	Belinda Peregrín; Gavriel Aminov; Ignacio Peregrín; Paolo Prudencio	Catarsis	2013	
"DJ Play a Christmas Song"	Cher with Belinda	Sarah Hudson; Jesse Saint John; Brett McLaughlin; James Abrahart; Mark Schick; Lionel Crasta	Christmas	2024	
"Dónde está el amor"	Belinda	Alejandro Abaroa; Alejandro Carballo	Cómplices Al Rescate: Silvana	2002	
"Dónde estás"	Descemer Bueno feat. Belinda	Descemer Bueno	360º	2019	
"Dopamina"	Belinda	Belinda; Nacho Peregrín; Jörgen Ringqvist; Daniel Barkman	Carpe Diem	2010	
"Duele"	Belinda	Cathy Dennis; Chris Braide; Belinda; Nacho Peregrín	Carpe Diem	2010	
"Eden"	Belinda	Keith Ernesto Harris; Earnest Hughes Renard; Ellis Miah; Belinda Peregrín Schüll; Marguerite Maria Szabo; Lucas Vidal	Non-album single	2022	
"Egoísta"	Belinda feat. Pitbull	Jimmy Harry; Belinda; Nacho Peregrín; Armando Pérez	Carpe Diem	2010	
"Egoísta (English Version)"	Belinda feat. Pitbull	Jimmy Harry; Belinda; Nacho Peregrín; Armando Pérez; Jessie Malakouti	Carpe Diem	2010	
"El baile del sapito" (Note: A live version with additional rap lyrics, performed by Belinda alongside rapper Josh, was released on Belinda's DVD Fiesta en la Azotea: En Vivo Desde el Auditorio Nacional.)	Belinda & Cómplices	Christina Abaroa; Alejandro Abaroa	Cómplices Al Rescate: Mariana	2002	
"Él me mintió, mentiras, mentiras"	Mentiras: La serie, Belinda, Diana Bovio	Alejandro Jaen Palacios; Amanda Antonio Miguel; Gabriela Beatriz Carballo; Luisa Anella Fatello; Miguel Atilio Boccadoro Hernández; Teresa Presmanes Corona	Mentiras: La Serie	2025	
"En el amor hay que perdonar"	Belinda	Belinda Peregrín; Víctor Martinez; Ignacio Peregrín; Joan M. Ortíz	Catarsis	2012 (Note: Released as a digital single on June 19, 2012.)	
"En la obscuridad"	Belinda	Belinda Peregrín; Ignacio Peregrín; Víctor Martinez; Joan M. Ortíz	Catarsis	2013	
"En la obscuridad"	Grupo Cañaveral de Humberto Pabón feat. Belinda	Belinda Peregrín; Ignacio Peregrín; Víctor Martinez; Joan M. Ortíz	Fiesta Total	2017	
"End of the Day"	Belinda	Kara DioGuardi; Mitch Allan	Utopía	2007	
"Es de verdad"	Belinda	Diego G. Karenka; Reyli	Utopía	2007	
"Es ella mas que yo"	Mentiras: La serie, Belinda	José Ramón García Flórez; Marella Cayre	Mentiras: La Serie	2025	
"Flamenkito"	Lérica & Belinda	Juan Carlos Arauzo; José Cano Carrilero; Abraham Mateo; Antonio Mateo Chamorro; Belinda Peregrín Schüll; Eduardo Ruiz Sánchez	Cocoterapia	2020 (Note: The song was originally released as a digital single on May 7, 2020, and later included on Lérica's album Cocoterapia on September 23, 2021.)	
"Frijolero"	Somos Frijoleros, Belinda & Snow Tha Product	Miguel Ángel Huidobro Preciado; Juan Francisco Ayala; R. Ebright	TBA	2024	
"Fuerte"	Belinda	Adrián Posse; Rudy Pérez	Belinda	2003	
"Gaia" (Note: The song debuted in the telenovela Camaleones under the original title "Planeta" in the credits.)	Belinda	Jimmy Harry; Belinda; Nacho Peregrín	Carpe Diem	2010	
"Good... good"	Belinda	Belinda; Nacho Peregrín; Karen Juantorena; Kandi Burruss	Utopía	2006	
"Heterocromía"	Belinda	Belinda Peregrín; Dani Raw; King Swift; Richard M. Sherman; Robert B. Sherman; Whitestar; Ehxx The Professor	Indómita	2025	
"I Love You... Te quiero"	Belinda feat. Pitbull	Belinda Peregrín; Gavriel Aminov; Ignacio Peregrín; Joan M. Ortíz; Paolo Prudencio; Armando Pérez; Lavi Hoss	Catarsis	2013	
"If We Were"	Belinda	Greg Wells; Shelly Peiken	Utopía	2007	
"Interludio"	Belinda	Belinda	Indómita	2025	
"Intimidad"	Lápiz Conciente feat. Belinda	Ariel Augusto Ayala Salas; Avelino Junior Figueroa; Belinda Peregrín; Israel Domingo Rodríguez	Latidos	2016	
"JACKPOT"	Belinda, Kenia Os	Belinda Peregrín; Daniel Esteban Taborda; Ismael Cano, Jr. Jorge Andres Villa; Andrés David Restrepo; Kenia Guadalupe Flores Osuna; Matthew Rey; Mechi Pieretti; Oscar Görres; R. Zastenker; Santiago García	Indómita	2024 (Note: Released as a digital single on October 24, 2024.)	
"Juntas para siempre"	Belinda	Alejandro Carballo; Alejandro Abaroa	Aventuras en el Tiempo: El Final en Concierto	2001	
"K-bron" (Note: Originally uploaded to YouTube as "Mentiras Cabrón," later simplified to "Mentiras," and subsequently retitled "K-bron.")	Belinda	Unknown	Non-album promotional single (Note: The official audio was exclusively released through the official Belinda channel on YouTube and on radio airplay.)	2022 (Note: The song was initially uploaded to Belinda's official YouTube channel on February 19, 2022, but it was subsequently made private. A new video was then uploaded on May 20, 2022.)	
"La chapa que vibran" (Remix)	La Materialista, Belinda, Jojo Maronttinni feat. Topo La Maskara	Juan José Brito Castillo; Jordana Gleise de Jesus Mendez; Belinda Peregrín Schüll; Yameiry Josefina Infante Honoret	Non-album single	2019	
"La cuadrada"	Belinda, Tito Double P	Tito Double P Belinda Peregrín; Angel Saldoval	Indómita	2025	
"La mala"	Belinda	Belinda Peregrín; Daniel Rondon; Essa Gante; Johnny Julca; Miguel Angel	Indómita	2024 (Note: Released as a digital single on August 15, 2024.)	
"La niña de la escuela"	Lola Índigo feat. Tini & Belinda	Andy Clay Cruz; Belinda Peregrín Schüll; Luis Salazar; Martina Stoessel; Miriam Doblas Muñoz	La Niña	2021	
"Las 12"	Ana Mena feat. Belinda	Ana Mena; Belinda Peregrín; Andrés Torres; Mauricio Rengifo	Bellodrama	2022 (Note: Initially released as digital single on June 17, 2022, and later included on Ana Mena's album Bellodrama on March 24, 2023.)	
"Lazos"	Belinda	Alejandro Abaroa; Alejandro Carballo	Cómplices Al Rescate: Mariana	2002	
"Litost"	Belinda	Belinda Peregrín; Gavriel Aminov; Ignacio Peregrín	Catarsis	2013	
"Llévame a volar"	Belinda & Fabián	Alejandro Abaroa; Alejandro Carballo	Cómplices Al Rescate: Mariana	2002	
"Llórame un río"	Enrique Iglesias feat. Belinda	Enrique Iglesias; Descemer Bueno; Belinda Peregrín; Carlos Paucar; Waldo Mendoza	Final Vol. 2	2024	
"Lo puedo lograr (Someday)"	Belinda	Niklas Hilborn; Thomas Jansson; Belinda; Mauri Stern	Belinda	2003	
"Lo siento (I'm Sorry)"	Belinda	Lucy Abbot; Sara Eker; Cheryl Parker; Twin; Belinda; Mauri Stern	Belinda	2003	
"Lolita"	Belinda	Jimmy Harry; Belinda; Nacho Peregrín; Alaina Beaton	Carpe Diem	2010	
"Luz"	Various (Note: Lucero, Cristian Castro, Pedro Fernández, Diego Verdaguer, Pandora, Carlos Rivera, Belinda, Diego Boneta, Ana Victoria, La Adictiva Banda San José De Mesillas, Edwin Luna, Emir Pabón & Grupo Cañaveral, Leandro Ríos, Marian & Mariel, Ruby Escobar, Iskander, ATL, Jary, Carla Mauri, Lemongrass.)	Mónica Vélez; Julio Ramírez	México Se Pinta De Luz	2016	
"Luz sin gravedad"	Belinda	Belinda; Nacho Peregrín; Jimmy Harry	Utopía	2006	
"Madrid X Marbella"	Juan Magán & Belinda	Juan Manuel Magán González; Henry Antonio Méndez Reynoso; Luiggi Olivares Gordon Giussepe; Belinda Peregrín Schüll	Non-album single	2020	
"Maldita suerte" (Note: The song debuted in the telenovela Camaleones under the original title "Bossa" in the credits.)	Belinda	Jimmy Harry; Belinda; Nacho Peregrín; Jörgen Rinqvist	Carpe Diem	2010	
"Me alimento de ti"	Mentiras: La serie, Luis Gerardo Méndez, Belinda	Gonzalo Benavides	Mentiras: La Serie	2025	
"Me encantaría"	Abraham Mateo & Belinda	José Alfonso Cano Carrilero; Abraham Mateo; Belinda Peregrín; Daniel Ruiz	Non-album single	2022	
"Me nace del corazón"	Belinda	Juan Gabriel	¡Amigos x Siempre! en la Ruta de la Amistad	2000	
"Meu Menino (Minha Menina)"	Luan Santana feat. Belinda	J. A. Longo; Mont' Alve; Walmir	Ao Vivo no Rio	2011	
"Mi ángel de amor"	Belinda	Eduardo Meza Rodríguez	¡Amigos X Siempre!	2000	
"Mi religión" (Note: The song debuted in the telenovela Camaleones under the original title "Religión" in the credits.)	Belinda	Belinda; Nacho Peregrín; Lars "Quang" Nielsen; Niklas Nielsen; Gabrial Ssezibwa; Rene Prang	Carpe Diem	2010	
"Mírame feliz"	Belinda, Xavi	Alex Hernández; Andy Clay; Belinda Peregrín; Fabio Gutierrez; Ivan Gamez; Joshua Gutierrez; Roberto Zamudio; Salvador Iaponte; Angel Sandoval	Indómita	2025	
"Mis Deseos / Feliz Navidad"	Il Volo feat. Belinda	José Feliciano	Buon Natale: The Christmas Album	2013	
"Muchachitas"	Belinda	Lorena Tassianri	Muchachitas Como Tú	2007	
"Mudanzas"	Mentiras: La serie, Belinda, Mariana Treviño, Regina Blandón feat. Diana Bovio	Sérgio Antônio Sá de Albuquerque; Vanusa Santos Flores	Mentiras: La Serie	2025	
"Muriendo lento"	Moderatto feat. Belinda	Björn Ulvaeus; Benny Andersson; Alex Zepeda	Detector de Metal	2004	
"Nada"	Belinda	Diane Warren; Belinda Peregrín	Catarsis	2013	
"Never Enough"	Belinda	Belinda; Nacho Peregrín; Greg Kurstin	Utopía	2006	
"Never Not Love You"	Belinda, 30 Seconds to Mars	Angel Sandoval; Belinda; David Bravou; Shannon Leto; Jared Leto; Julia Lewis; Ammar Malik; Stefan Johnson; Michael Pollack; Marcus Lomax; Jordan K. Johnson; Olivér Germán; Peterhof	Indómita	2025	
"Ni Freud ni tu mamá"	Belinda	Belinda; Nacho; Greg Wells; Shelly Peiken	Utopía	2006	
"Ni fiestas, ni flores" (Spotify Single)	Belinda, Kevin AMF & Netón Vega	TBA	Non-album promotional single	2024	
"Niña de ayer (Everyday Girl)"	Belinda	Fredrik Björk; Per Eklund; Belinda; Mauri Stern	Belinda	2003	
"No entiendo (I Don't Understand You)" (Note: A duet version with Andy & Lucas was recorded for the Spanish edition of her debut album.)	Belinda	Daniel Gibson; Belinda; Mauri Stern	Belinda	2003	
"No entiendo (I Don't Understand You)"	Belinda feat. Andy & Lucas	Daniel Gibson; Belinda; Mauri Stern	Belinda	2004	
"No es tan fácil"	Belinda	Alejandro Carballo	Aventuras en el Tiempo en Vivo	2001	
"No estamos tan locos"	Lérica & Belinda	Juan Carlos Arauzo Olivares; José Alfonso Cano Carrilero; Antonio Carmona Amaya; José Miguel Carmona Niño; Antonio Mateo; Abraham Mateo Chamorro; Belinda Peregrín Schüll; Eduardo Ruiz Sánchez; José Soto Barea	TBA	2022	
"No me vuelvo a enamorar"	Belinda	Belinda Peregrín; José Luis Ortega; Juan Andrés Vergara; Diego Benlliure	Catarsis	2013	
"Noche cool"	Belinda	Belinda; Karen Juantorena; Kara DioGuardi; Nicole Scherzinger	Utopía	2006	
"Oscar Mayer" (Tema)	Belinda	Unknown	Oscar Mayer Cantando Hasta La Fama (Note: A promotional CD released by the American meat and cold cut producer Oscar Mayer to meet Belinda and offer prizes.)	2001	
"Pacto de amor"	Belinda & Martín Ricca	Christina Abaroa; Alejandro Abaroa; Jesús Flores "La Bota"	¡Amigos X Siempre!	2000	
"Pasó, pasó"	Martín Ricca & Belinda	Alejandro Abaroa; Christina Abaroa; Claudia Brant	¡Amigos X Siempre!	2000	
"Por tu amor"	Belinda & Cómplices	Alejandro Abaroa; Alejandro Carballo	Cómplices Al Rescate: Mariana	2002	
"Princesa"	Belinda	Adrián Posse; Rudy Pérez; Cynthia Salazar	Belinda	2003	
"Pudo ser tan fácil"	Belinda	Belinda; Nacho Peregrín; Robert Habolin	Utopía	2006	
"Que cante la vida por Chile"	Artists for Chile (Note: A.B. Quintanilla III, Alberto Plaza, Alejandra Guzmán, Aleks Syntek, Alexandre Pires, Álex Ubago, Belinda, Carlos Baute, Christian Chávez, Fanny Lu, Fausto Miño, Fonseca, Franco De Vita, Gabriela Villalba, Gian Marco, Jorge Villamizar, Juan Fernando Velasco, Juan Luis Guerra, Koko, Lena, Luis Fonsi, Marciano, Mario Guerrero, Noel Schajris, Pablo Holman, Pablo Herrera, Peewee, Ricardo Montaner.)	Alberto Plaza	Non-album single (Note: A charity single recorded to benefit the victims of the February 27, 2010 Chile earthquake, featuring the original song written and recorded by Alberto Plaza in 1985.)	2010	
"Quién"	Kumbia Kings feat. Belinda	Gabriel Ramírez Flores; Luigi Giraldo	Fuego	2004	
"Rayo McQueen"	Belinda, Alemán	Alemán; América Sierra; Angel Sandoval; Belinda Peregrín; NaisGai	Indómita	2025	
"Resistiré"	Resistiré México (Note: Aida Cuevas, Arath Herce, Axel Muñiz, Belinda, Benny Ibarra, Camila, Caztro, Chucho Rivas, Cristian Castro, DLD, Edith Márquez, Gloria Trevi, Ha-Ash, Horacio Palencia, Kaia Lana, Kinky, Leonel Garcia, Lila Downs, Lupe Esparza, María José, María León, MC Davo, Mijares, Moenia, Paty Cantú, Rodrigo Davila, Río Roma, Sandra Echeverria, Ximena Sariñana, Yahir.)	Carlos Toro Montoro; Manuel de la Calva Diego	Non-album single (Note: A charity single recorded to benefit to COVID-19 pandemic in Mexico, featuring the original song written and recorded by Dúo Dinámico in 1988.)	2020	
"Rodolfo el reno de la nariz roja"	Belinda	Johnny Marks	Navidad con Amigos	2006	
"Sabes"	Belinda & Fabián	Alejandro Abaroa; Alejandro Carballo	Cómplices Al Rescate: Mariana	2002	
"Sácame a bailar"	Belinda & Cómplices	Alejandro Abaroa; Alejandro Carballo	Cómplices Al Rescate: Mariana	2002	
"Sal de mi piel"	Belinda	Belinda	Camaleones: Música de la Telenovela (Note: Main the song for the telenovela Camaleones. It was included as part of its soundtrack. Subsequently, it was incorporated into Belinda's album Carpe Diem with minor alterations.)	2009 (Note: The song was originally released as a digital single on August 14, 2009.)	
"See a Little Light"	Belinda	Belinda; Nacho Peregrín; Jimmy Harry	Utopía	2006	
"Si no te quisiera"	Juan Magán feat. Belinda & Lápiz Conciente	Avelino Junior Figueroa Rodríguez; Juan Manuel Magán González; Carlos Ariel Peralta Jr; Agustín Sarasa González	The King Is Back - #LatinIBIZAte	2014	
"Si nos dejan"	Belinda (Note: A live version was recorded for the album Aventuras en el Tiempo en Vivo in a duet with Juan Pablo Gamboa.)	José Alfredo Jiménez	Aventuras en el Tiempo	2001	
"Si nos dejan"	Christian Nodal & Belinda	José Alfredo Jiménez	Non-album single (Note: Main theme song for the telenovela Si nos dejan.)	2021	
"Si tú me llamas" (BSO Tadeo Jones 3)	Omar Montes & Belinda	David Augustave Picanes; José Luis de la Peña Mira; Pedro Elipe Navarro; Bruno Nicolás Fernández; Leiry Salcedo; Omar Montes; Marc Montserrat I Ruiz; Belinda Peregrín Schüll; Alexis M Pucachaqui	Non-album single (Note: Main theme song for the animated movie Tadeo Jones 3: La tabla esmeralda .)	2022	
"Siente el amor"	Belinda & Cómplices	Alejandro Abaroa; Alejandro Carballo	Cómplices Al Rescate: Silvana	2002	
"Silvana"	Belinda	Belinda Peregrín; Dani Raw; Julia Lewis; María José De la Torre Villaseñor	Indómita	2025	
"Sin dolor (Turn The Page)"	Belinda	Andreas Carlsson; Alban Herlitz; Negin Djafari; Belinda; Mauri Stern	Belinda	2003	
"Sólo gracias"	Martín Ricca & Belinda	Alejandro Abaroa; Pablo Aguirre; Christina Abaroa	¡Amigos x Siempre! en la Ruta de la Amistad	2000	
"Somos el mundo"	Artistas por Haití (Note: Conductors: Emilio Estefan, Gloria Estefan, Quincy Jones. Soloists: Juanes, Ricky Martin, José Feliciano, Vicente Fernández, Luis Enrique, Romeo Santos, Pee Wee, Belinda, José Luis Rodríguez, Banda El Recodo, Shakira, Thalía, Jenni Rivera, Tito El Bambino, Kany García, Luis Fonsi, Jon Secada, Willy Chirino, Lissette, Ana Bárbara, Gilberto Santa Rosa, Juan Luis Guerra, David Archuleta, Cristian Castro, Ednita Nazario, Paquita la del Barrio, Ricardo Montaner, Gloria Estefan, Luis Miguel, Chayanne, Olga Tañón, Natalia Jiménez, Paulina Rubio, Nicky Jam, Melina León, Pitbull, Taboo, Daddy Yankee. Chorus: A.B. Quintanilla, Alacranes Musical, Alejandro Fernández, Aleks Syntek, Alexandra Cheron, Andy García, Angélica María, Angélica Vale, Arthur Hanlon, Carlos Santana, Christian Chávez, Cristina Saralegui, Diana Reyes, Eddy Herrera, Eiza González, Emily Estefan, Enrique Iglesias, Fernando Villalona, Flex, Fonseca, Gloria Trevi, Jencarlos Canela, Johnny Pacheco, Jorge Celedón, Jorge Moreno, Jorge Villamizar, Joselyn Rivera, La Arrolladora Banda El Limón, Kat DeLuna, K-Paz de la Sierra, Lena Burke, Lucero, Luz Rios, Marc Anthony, Miguel Bosé, Milly Quezada, Montez de Durango, Ojeda, Patricia Manterola, Rey Ruiz, Sergio Mayer, Wisin & Yandel.)	Gloria Estefan; Lionel Richie; Michael Jackson	Non-album single (Note: A charity single recorded to benefit the victims of the January 12, 2010 Haiti earthquake, Spanish-language remake of the 1985 hit song "We Are the World.")	2010	
"Sueño de amor"	Laura Esquivel & Belinda	Carlos Nilson; Mario Schajris	Patito Feo: La Historia Más Linda en el Teatro	2007	
"Sueño de ti"	Motel feat. Belinda & MLKMN	Rodrigo Dávila; Billy Méndez; Óscar Botello "Milkman"	Prisma	2013	
"Superstar"	Belinda	Alejandro Abaroa; Christina Abaroa; Pablo Aguirre	Cómplices Al Rescate: Silvana	2002	
"Takes One to Know One"	Belinda	Robert Habolin; Marcus Sepehrmanesh	Utopía	2007	
"Te quiero (Acoustic Version)"	Flex feat. Belinda	Félix Danilo Gómez	Te Quiero: Romantic Style in da World	2008	
"Te quiero (Spanglish Version)"	Flex feat. Belinda	Félix Danilo Gómez	Te Quiero: Romantic Style in da World	2008	
"Te sigo amando"	Juan Gabriel feat. Belinda	Alberto Aguilera Valadez	Los Dúo 2	2015	
"Te voy a esperar"	Juan Magán feat. Belinda	Juan Manuel Magán González; Carlos Andrés Alcaraz Gómez; David López Cendros; Diego Alejandro Vanegas Londono	Catarsis (Note: Main theme song for the animated movie Las aventuras de Tadeo Jones later included as a bonus track to the digital edition of Belinda's album Catarsis in 2013.)	2012 (Note: Initially released as digital single on August 7, 2012, and was later included as a bonus track to the digital edition of Belinda's album Catarsis in 2013.)	
"Tema de Casimiro"	Belinda	Alejandro Abaroa; Pablo Aguirre; Christina Abaroa	¡Amigos x Siempre! en la Ruta de la Amistad	2000	
"Tiempos mejores"	Mentiras: La serie, Luis Gerardo Méndez, Belinda, Mariana Treviño feat. Diana Bovio, Regina Blandón	Sergio Gustavo Andrade Sánchez	Mentiras: La Serie	2025	
"Todo puede suceder"	Martín Ricca, Belinda & Amigos x siempre	Alejandro Abaroa; Alejandro Carballo; Luis Ángel Pastor	¡Amigos X Siempre!	2000	
"Todos al mismo tiempo"	Belinda & Christopher	Christina Abaroa; Alejandro Abaroa	Aventuras en el Tiempo	2001	
"Translation"	Vein feat. Belinda & J Balvin	Gavruel Aminov; José Álvaro Osorio Balvin; Belinda; Keith Ross Spencer	Non-album single	2014	
"Un traguito"	Lérica & Belinda	Juan Carlos Arauzo Olivares; José Alfonso Cano Carrilero; Abraham Mateo; Antonio Mateo Chamorro; Belinda Peregrín; Juan Luis Ramírez; Eduardo Ruiz Sánchez	De Cero	2019	
"Una mamacita"	Showtek, Belinda & Nacho	Thomas Bratfoss Eriksen; Peter Anthony Hanna; Sjoerd Janssen; Wouter Janssen; Miguel Ignacio Mendoza; Belinda Peregrín; Francesca M Richard; Yhonny Rivero; Ender Zambrano	Non-album single	2020	
"Utopía"	Belinda	Belinda; Nacho Peregrín; Greg Kurstin; Sia Furler	Utopía	2006	
"Van Gogh"	Belinda, Mala Rodríguez	Belinda Peregrín; Bull Nene; Julia Lewis; Mala Rodríguez Garrido; Tuny; Angel Sandoval	Indómita	2025	
"Vivir (Any Better)"	Belinda	Gustav "Grizzly" Jonsson; Marcus "Mack" Sepehrmanesh; Tommy Tysper; Belinda; Mauri Stern	Belinda	2003	
"Volver a casa"	Belinda & Cómplices	Christina Abaroa; Alejandro Abaroa	Cómplices Al Rescate: Mariana	2002	
"Voy A Conquistarte (I'm Gonna Make You Love Me)"	Belinda	Fredrik Hutt; Asa Larisson; Peter Landin; Kent Larssen; Belinda; Mauri Stern	Belinda	2003	
"Vuelve a mí" (Note: Alternatively titled "Contigo aprendí ballad.")	Belinda	Belinda Peregrín; Gavriel Aminov; Ignacio Peregrín; Paolo Prudencio	Catarsis	2013	
"Wacko"	Belinda	Belinda; Nacho Peregrín; Jörgen Rinqvist; Daniel Barkman	Carpe Diem	2010	
"Wet Dreams"	Belinda, Tokischa	Belinda Peregrín; Okei Flou; Tokischa Altagracia Peralta	Indómita	2025	
"Why Wait"	Belinda	Robbie Nevil; Matthew Gerrard	The Cheetah Girls 2 (Note: Later included in the reissue of Belinda's album Utopía.)	2006	
"Your Hero"	Finley feat. Belinda	Danilo Calvio; Stefano Mantegazza; Marco Pedretti; Daniele Persoglio; Carmine Ruggiero	Adrenalina 2	2008	

== Unreleased songs ==
Name of song, writers, and any other notes
Song	Writer(s)	Year	Notes
"Aguardiente"	William Omar Landrón; Víctor Martínez Rodríguez; Joan Manuel Ortiz Espada; Belinda Peregrín; José Ignacio Peregrín Gutiérrez	2012	Registered by the Broadcast Music, Inc. (BMI).; A collaboration with Don Omar recorded in 2012.; Intended for Catarsis (2013).; Alternatively titled "Agua Ardiente."; Belinda performed the song on her Libertad: Báilala! Tour.; The song was leaked and uploaded to YouTube.
"Aunque no me quieras"	Descemer Bueno Martínez; Horacio Palencia Cisneros; Belinda Peregrín	Unknown	Registered by the Broadcast Music, Inc. (BMI).; Recorded by Fidel Rueda.
"Bailaría sobre el fuego (Spanglish Version)"	Unknown	2012	Intended for Catarsis (2013).
"Beso en la boca"	Gavriel Aminov; Belinda Peregrín; José Ignacio Peregrín Gutiérrez; Paolo Prudencio	Unknown	Registered by the Broadcast Music, Inc. (BMI).
"Cola-Cola Zero" (Note: Unofficial title)	Unknown	2009	An advertising campaign for The Coca-Cola Company.; The lyrics are an adaptation of the song "99 Luftballons" by the German band Nena.
"Colores reales"	Thomas Kelly; William Steinberg	2016	Recorded for the Latin American dubbed version of the animated film Trolls.; Performed by Aleks Syntek (as Ramón) and Belinda (as Poppy).
"Con los ojos cerrados"	Víctor Martínez Rodríguez; Joan Manuel Ortiz Espada; Belinda Peregrín; José Ignacio Peregrín Gutiérrez	2012	Registered by the Broadcast Music, Inc. (BMI).; A collaboration with Omega recorded in 2012.; Intended for Catarsis (2013).; Belinda performed the song on her Libertad: Báilala! Tour.; The song was leaked and uploaded to YouTube.
"Contigo en la distancia"	César Portillo de la Luz	2008	Recorded for the Mexican television series Mujeres asesinas.; A video directed by Chava Cartas and Pedro Torres was uploaded to the YouTube channel of Pedro Torres, the executive producer of the television series.
"Cuando hay dos"	Justin Timberlake; Mike Elizondo; Michael Pollack; Emily Warren	2023	Recorded for the Latin American dubbed version of the animated film Trolls Band Together.; Performed by Belinda, Karla Díaz, Benny Ibarra, Erik Rubín, Diego Schoening, Yahir and chorus.
"El circo"	Unknown	2001	Recorded for the Mexican telenovela series Aventuras en el tiempo.
"Familia"	Justin Timberlake; Mike Elizondo; Michael Pollack; Emily Warren	2023	Recorded for the Latin American dubbed version of the animated film Trolls Band Together.; Performed by Benny Ibarra, Erik Rubín, Diego Schoening, Yahir, Jerry Velázquez, Belinda, Karla Díaz and chorus.
"Ideal para mi"	Justin Timberlake; Ludwig Göransson; Kenyon Dixon	2020	Recorded for the Latin American dubbed version of the animated film Trolls World Tour.; Performed by Benny Ibarra (as Ramón) and Belinda (as Poppy).
"Insaciable"	Belinda Peregrín; José Ignacio Peregrín Gutiérrez; Jorge A Villamizar	2012	Registered by the Broadcast Music, Inc. (BMI).; Intended for Catarsis (2013).; Belinda posted some lyrics from the song on Twitter.
"Los trolls quieren diversión nada más"	Robert Hazard; Bernard Edwards; Nile Rodgers; Ludwig Göransson; Kenan Thompson; Christopher Hartz; Dmitry Brill; Herbie Hancock; Q-Tip; Lady Miss Kier; Towa Tei	2020	Recorded for the Latin American dubbed version of the animated film Trolls World Tour.; Performed by Belinda (as Poppy), Benny Ibarra (as Ramón), Beto Castillo (as Diamantito) and chorus.; Justin Timberlake, Icona Pop, Ester Dean appear with their original voice recording.
"Me equivoqué"	Unknown	2001	Recorded for the Mexican telenovela series Aventuras en el tiempo.
"Me levantaré"	Benj Pasek; Justin Paul	2016	Recorded for the Latin American dubbed version of the animated film Trolls.; Performed by Belinda (as Poppy) and Annie Rojas (chorus).
"México lindo y querido"	Jesús Monge Ramírez	2018	Belinda recorded the song and posted a video on Twitter in support of the then-presidential candidate of Mexico, Andrés Manuel López Obrador.
"Mister Sweet Face"	Belinda	Unknown	Written for Nicki Minaj.
"Muevan esa cabellera / B.A.I.L.E. / Día de sol"	Jesper Mortensen; Gaspard Auge; Jessie Chaton; Xavier de Rosnay; Stephen McCarthy	2016	Recorded for the Latin American dubbed version of the animated film Trolls.; Performed by Belinda (as Poppy), Daniela Luján (as DJ Suki), Rick Loera (as Grandulón), Pascual Meza (as Cooper) and chorus.
"No me odies"	Diana Marcela de la Garza Pérez; Belinda Peregrín	2019	Registered by the Broadcast Music, Inc. (BMI).; Registered by the American Society of Composers, Authors and Publishers (ASCAP).; A video was uploaded to Instagram featuring Belinda and Marcela de la Garza composing and singing the song.
"No me vuelves a dañar"	Unknown	2012	Intended for Catarsis (2013).
"Sé diferente"	Unknown	2003	A promotional music video was filmed as part of an advertising campaign for Televisa Monterrey, featuring the network's slogan "Sé diferente" (Be different).; The lyrics are an adaptation of the song "Lo siento."
"The Sound of Silence"	Paul Simon	2016	Recorded for the Latin American dubbed version of the animated film Trolls.; Performed by Belinda (as Poppy) and chorus.
"Tienes que poder"	Unknown	2001	Recorded for the Mexican telenovela series Aventuras en el tiempo.
"Torai"	Unknown	2024	A collaboration recorded for the upcoming album of Grupo Marca Registrada.; The collaboration was later canceled due to comments made by Fidel Castro, the vocalist of Grupo Marca Registrada, about Belinda.
"Tristeza crónica"	Unknown	2012	Intended for Catarsis (2013).
"Un mejor lugar"	Shellback; Justin Timberlake; Amy Allen	2023	Recorded for the Latin American dubbed version of the animated film Trolls Band Together.; Performed by Benny Ibarra, Erik Rubín, Diego Schoening, Yahir, Jerry Velázquez, Belinda, Karla Díaz and chorus.
"Vamos a cantar"	Justin Timberlake; Ludwig Göransson; Max Martin; Sarah Aarons	2020	Recorded for the Latin American dubbed version of the animated film Trolls World Tour.; Performed by Belinda (as Poppy), Benny Ibarra (as Ramón), Kalimba, María José and chorus.
"Voy a salir / Soy como soy"	Nile Rodgers; Bernard Edwards; Sean Combs; Christopher Wallace; Stevie Jordan; Mason Betha	2016	Recorded for the Latin American dubbed version of the animated film Trolls.; Performed by Annie Rojas (as Bridget), Belinda (as Poppy), Daniela Luján (as DJ Suki), Rick Loera (as Grandulón), Pascual Meza (as Cooper) and chorus.
