= Mentiras, el musical =

2009 Mexican jukebox musical

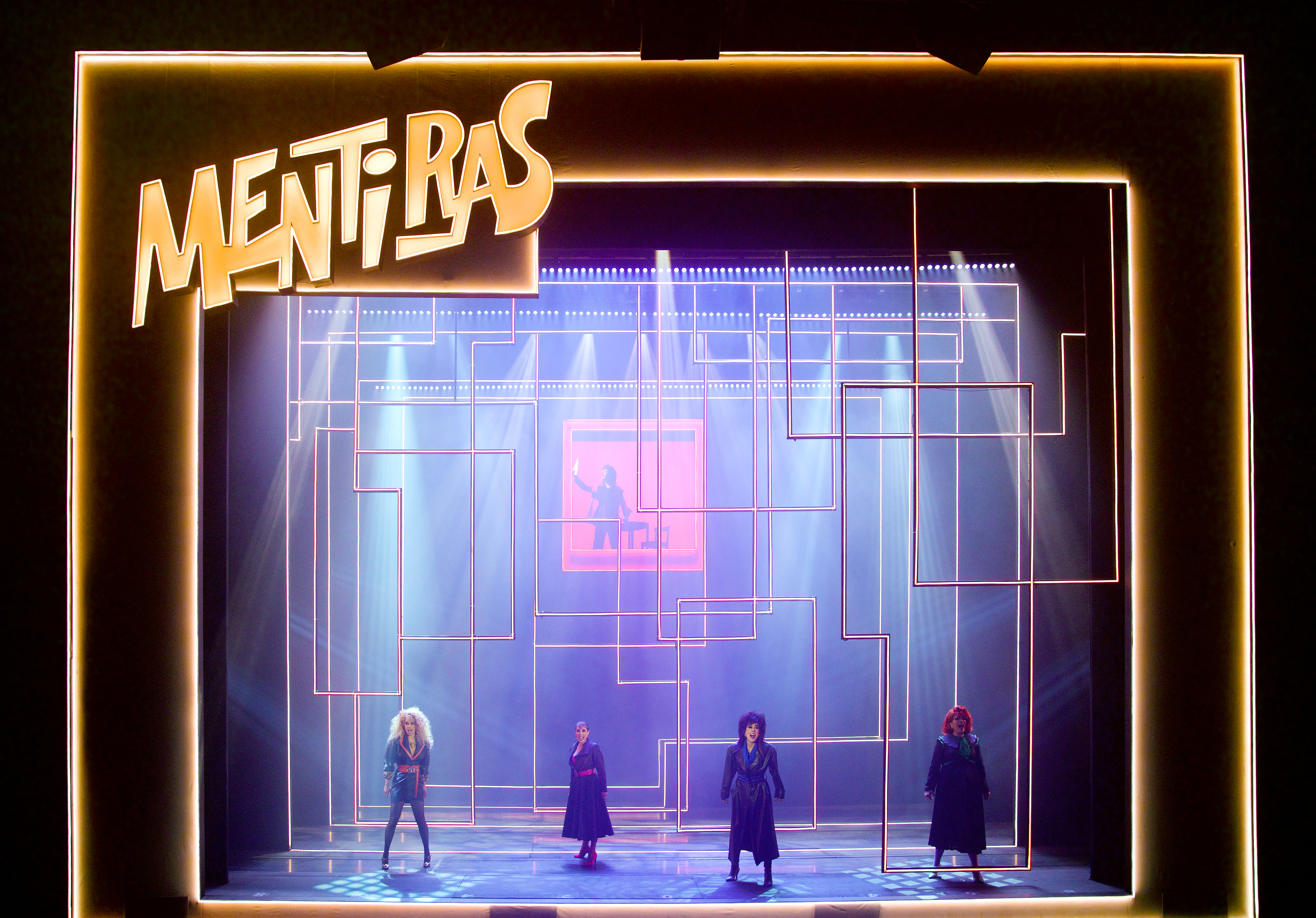
Mentiras El Musical, 2022

Mentiras, el musical is a 2009 Mexican jukebox musical based on popular Spanish-language songs from the 1980s. It was written and directed by José Manuel López Velarde and produced by OCESA, with Federico González Compeán and Morris Gilbert serving as executive producers. The musical celebrated its 600th performance in November 2010. A cast recording was released on CD and through iTunes by OCESA Seitrack, followed by a karaoke version of the soundtrack.

On March 11, 2024, Amazon Prime Video announced a television adaptation of the musical, starring Belinda, Luis Gerardo Mendez, Diana Bovio, Mariana Treviño and Regina Blandón. The series premiered on June 13, 2025 as Mentiras, la serie.

== Plot ==
The plot revolves around a funeral in which four women discover they all were romantically involved with the deceased Emmanuel. The funeral is hosted by Emmanuel's sister Manuela, whose face is never revealed as she is hiding under a black cloak. It is stated in Emmanuel's will that one of the women in the funeral was the responsible for his murder, and they should all try to figure it out so the guilty one can be sent to prison and the other ones may receive Emmanuel's Inheritance. The four women start retelling their stories and realize they all had reasons to kill him, but in the end no one was able to do it. They figure out that the will states that anyone in the room might be the murderer and decide to blame Manuela. As Manuela tries to escape, she is captured by the other women and it is revealed she is really Emmanuel in disguise. Emmanuel was getting too anxious trying to hide his relationship with all of them and so decided to fake his own death. The women decide they don't love him any more and leave him all alone.

== Pop culture references ==
The musical has many references to 1980s pop culture in Mexico, the names of the four protagonists are names of famous singers from the decade, television shows and soap operas from the decade are mentioned as well as popular places. The songs used in the musical are from popular Mexican singers in the 1980s like Yuri, Daniela Romo and Lupita D'Alessio

== Original cast ==
- Daniela: Natalia Sosa
- Dulce: Mónica Huarte
- Lupita: Mariana Treviño
- Yuri: Pía Aun
- Emmanuel: Andrés Zuno
- Manuela: Crisanta Gómez
- Lety López (Swing)
- Marta Fernanda (Swing)

== Replacement cast ==
- Daniela: Crisanta Gómez, Marta Fernanda, Georgina Levín, Ana Cecilia Anzaldúa, Paola Gómez, Hiromi, Majo Pérez, Angelica Vale (guest)
- Dulce: Marta Fernanda, Lety López, Paola Gómez, Georgina Levin, Hiromi, Lolita Cortés.
- Lupita: Marta Fernanda, Lety López, Paola Gómez, María Filippini, Lolita Cortés, Tatiana Palacios Chapa, Carmen Sarahi, Hiromi.
- Yuri: Crisanta Gómez, Marta Fernanda, Lety López, Jimena Parés, Lolita Cortés, Ana Cecilia Anzaldúa, Majo Pérez, Paloma Cordero, Hiromi.
- Emmanuel: Patricio Borghetti, Mauricio Martínez, Mauricio Salas, Rykardo Hernández, Mariano Palacios, Yahir (guest)
- Manuela: Sandra Lan, Lorena Barquet, Jimena Parés.

== National tour ==
In May 2010, it was confirmed that Mentiras will go on a National Tour, while still playing in Mexico City.

On May 26, 2010, it was confirmed that Ricardo Hernández and Mariano Palacios will be playing the role of Emmanuel in Mexico City since Patricio Borghetti will be in the National Tour.

Th show started its national tour with three performances in "Teatro Banamex" in Santa Fe May 14 through 16, and has been touring the country ever since.
