= Arturo Álvarez =

Arturo Alvarez may refer to:

- Arturo Álvarez (basketball), Spanish basketball coach
- Arturo Álvarez (footballer, born 1959), Mexican footballer
- Arturo Álvarez (footballer, born 1985), American-born Salvadoran footballer
- Arturo Álvarez (swimmer) (1919–2015), Peruvian swimmer
- Arturo G. Álvarez, music producer, manager, A&R, and artist
