= Aventuras en el tiempo =

2001 Mexican comedy drama telenovela

- Genre: Telenovela; Comedy; Drama; Science fiction
- Directed by: Martín Pérez Islas; Salvador Sánchez; José Benavent
- Starring: Maribel Guardia; Gerardo Murguía; Belinda; Christopher von Uckermann; Odiseo Bichir
- Opening theme: Aventuras en el tiempo by Belinda & Christopher von Uckermann
- Country of origin: Mexico
- Original language: Spanish
- No. of seasons: 1
- No. of episodes: 105

Production
- Executive producer: Rosy Ocampo
- Producer: Eduardo Meza
- Production locations: Filming; Televisa San Ángel; Mexico City, Mexico
- Camera setup: Multi-camera
- Running time: 41-44 minutes
- Production company: Televisa

Original release
- Network: Canal de las Estrellas
- Release: March 19 – August 10, 2001

Aventuras en el tiempo (English: Adventures in Time) is a Mexican comedy drama telenovela produced by Rosy Ocampo for Televisa in 2001.

On March 19, 2001, Canal de las Estrellas started broadcasting Aventuras en el tiempo weekdays at 4:00 p.m., replacing Carita de Ángel. The last episode was broadcast on August 10, 2001 with María Belén replacing it the following Monday.

Maribel Guardia and Gerardo Murguía starred as adult protagonists, Belinda and Christopher von Uckermann starred as child protagonists, while Vanessa Guzmán and Odiseo Bichir starred as antagonists.

== Plot ==
Violeta lives with her uncle, because her mother died soon after she was born and she never knew her father. In addition to her uncle, Violeta stays with her grandmother from time to time as well. Violeta has a boyfriend named Ángel who gives her a pet dog.

While at her grandmother's house, Violeta discovers a time machine that her grandfather built, so she and her friends travel to different time periods. They visit several important events in Mexican history, learning these stories firsthand. The adults also end up traveling in time with the kids, and then it takes them all to recent time periods like the 1980s, where Violeta meets her mother and witnesses her own birth and her mother's death.

Later, she reunites with her father who is a well-respected doctor, and, after telling him and her uncle that she has found a time machine, they make a plan to save her mother the minute she gives birth to Violeta and take her to the future. Violeta's father successfully saves her mother.

Violeta's mother later wakes up and is told that she is in the future, and she sees that her daughter was the same girl who helped her to the hospital.

== Cast ==
- Maribel Guardia as Flor del Huerto
- Gerardo Murguia as Marcos Flores Rosales
- Belinda as Violeta Arcángel Flores
- Christopher von Uckermann as Ángel del Huerto
- Odiseo Bichir as Avaro Zopilote/Prof. Losthaim
- Vanessa Guzmán as Faby Wolf
- Mario Prudomme as Carlos Espino
- Gustavo Aguilar as Mr. Malrostro
- Juan Carlos Casasola as Lic. Chacal
- Alejandro Speitzer as Ernesto "Neto" del Huerto
- Naydelin Navarrete as Paloma
- Enrique Sánchez as Alejandro
- Ramiro Torres as Leonardo
- Daniela Mercado as María José
- Roberto Marín as Narciso Espino del Huerto
- Carmen Montejo as Margarita Rosales de Flores
- Marga López as Urraca Valdepeña
- Maricruz Nájera as Mrs. Zopilote
- Luis de Icaza as Kent Wolf (episodes 1–19)
- Héctor Ortega as Kent Wolf (episodes 20–105)
- Carlos Bracho as Geranio Flores
- Pedro Weber "Chatanuga" as Don Manuel del Bosque Verdozo
- Ricardo Chavez as Octavio
- Roxana Saucedo as Yazmín
- Javier Herranz as Jacinto del Huerto
- Héctor Cruz as Rufiano
- Greta Cervantes as Lidia
- Martha Sabrina as Carla Espino
- Mario Figueroa as Carlitos Espino
- Mónica Riestra as Estefani
- Bárbara Ferré as Begoña
- Sergio Catalán as Luis Fernando Téllez
- Nora Velázquez as Rocío del Bosque y Verduzco "Super Rocío"
- Lourdes Munguía as Rosalba del Campo
- Daniel Gauvry as Dr. Taimpress
- Juan Pablo Gamboa as Salvador Arcángel
- Roberto Tello as Méndez
- Tomás Tamez as Rosales
- Rafael del Villar as Luis del Monte
- Yissmali Castillo as Maritza
- Fernando Montaño as Rudolfín
- Luis Couturier as Actor
- Julio Camejo as Tony
- Sergio Saldivar as Luigi
- Luis Manuel Ávila as Police
- Ricardo Vera as Severo Correa
- Rubén Becerra as Sacerdote
- Franco Gala as Obrero
- Adriana Chapela as Angélica
- Silvia Pinal as Herself
- Martha Carrillo as Herself
- Magneto as Themselves
- Fabián Lavalle as Himself

=== Periods ===
==== Year 2470 ====
- Carlos Monden as Old Ángel del Huerto
- Irán Eory as Old Violeta Flores
- Rebeca Mankita as Adult Violeta Flores
- Susan Vohn as Young Violeta Flores
- Wendy González as Equis
- Marco Uriel as Intelligence Chief

==== Year 1989 ====
- Irán Castillo as Azucena Flores Rosales

==== Year 1965 ====
- Susan Vohn as Young Margarita Rosales
- Mayrín Villanueva as Young Urraca Valdepeña
- Ernesto D'Alessio as "El Brother"
- Alessandra Rosaldo as "La Flower"
- Odiseo Bichir as Tacaño Zopilote
- Gerardo Gallardo as Young Kent Wolf

==== Year 1950 ====
- Toño Infante as Epaminondas
- Miguel Galván as Godofredo "El Godis"
- Esther Rinaldi as Lupita
- Melina Escobedo as Estrellita
- Dolores Salomón "Bodokito" as Mercedes
- Silvia Contreras as Cook Ranch
- Pedro Romo as Rubén

==== Year 1910 ====
- Suzeth Cerame as María de la Luz
- Marco Zapata as María de la Luz's brother

==== Year 1900 ====
- Lucía Guilmáin as Mrs. Crescencia Amargura de Limón
- Amor Huerta as Dulce
- Nancy Patiño as Vicenta
- Karen Valencia as Juana
- María Fernanda Malo as Blonde girl from the orphanage
- Itzel Torres as Macrina
- Belinda as Rosenda
- Odiseo Bichir as Roñoso Zopilote
- Miguel Priego as Mr. who adopts Dulce
- Daniela Serratos
- José Luis Cordero "Pocholo"

==== Year 1894 ====
- Odiseo Bichir as Roñoso Zopilote
- Sylvia Pasquel as La Barbura
- Susimar Logu as Child Rosenda
- Diego Barquinero as Payasito Dieguín

==== Year 1885 ====
- Francis Laboriel as Princess Chorro de Humo
- Yulyenette Anaya as African girl

==== Year 1810 ====
- Archie Lafranco as Don Rómulo
- Joemy Blanco as Doña Isabel
- Ernesto Laguardia as Insurgente
- Francisco Rossel as Juan

==== Year 1790 ====
- Alejandra Meyer as Gitana

==== Year 1039 ====
- Salvador Sánchez as King Tlacay

==== Year 1000 ====
- Gabriel Ramos Villalpando as King Arturo

== Soundtracks ==
- Aventuras en el tiempo
- Aventuras en el tiempo en vivo

== Awards ==
Year	Award	Category	Nominee	Result
2002	20th TVyNovelas Awards	Best Male Revelation	Christopher von Uckermann	Nominated
