= Circo Gómez =

- Genre: Adult animation; Animated sitcom
- Created by: Eugenio Derbez
- Written by: Teco Lebrija; Arturo Navarro
- Directed by: Teco Lebrija; Ornella Antista
- Starring: Eugenio Derbez; Vanessa Bauche; Diana Bovio; Teco Lebrija; Omar Chaparro
- Composer: Jordi Bachbush
- Country of origin: Mexico
- Original language: Spanish
- No. of seasons: 1
- No. of episodes: 10

Production
- Executive producers: Jordan Rubio; Bob Kushell; Pablo Calasso; Eugenio Derbez; Ben Odell; Javier Williams; Arturo Navarro; Teco Lebrija
- Editor: Teco Lebrija
- Camera setup: Multi-camera
- Production companies: 3Pas Studios; F3 Media; Visceral

Original release
- Network: Vix
- Release: 5 June 2026

Circo Gómez is a Mexican adult animated sitcom created by Eugenio Derbez. The series features the voices of Derbez, Vanessa Bauche, Diana Bovio, Teco Lebrija and Omar Chaparro. It premiered on Vix on 5 June 2026.

== Premise ==
The series centers on a dysfunctional family of performers in a rundown traveling circus trying to stay afloat.

== Voice cast ==
- Eugenio Derbez as Filiberto Gómez
- Vanessa Bauche as Lupita Gómez
- Diana Bovio as Vicky Gómez
- Teco Lebrija as Chiquimoco
- Omar Chaparro as Refugio and Lobito Gómez

== Episodes ==
No.	Title	Original release date
1	"Bienvenido a Circo Gómez"	5 June 2026
2	"¡Está cañon!"	5 June 2026
3	"Circo de pulgas"	5 June 2026
4	"¡La Maja majestuosa!"	5 June 2026
5	"De viaje con los Gómez"	5 June 2026
6	"Pankiko"	5 June 2026
7	"Expo tu Circo Premium Plus Max Platinum"	5 June 2026
8	"#Chiquimocolandia"	5 June 2026
9	"No tan cómplices al rescate"	5 June 2026
10	"Volver al pasado"	5 June 2026
