= Cuando los hijos regresan =

- Directed by: Hugo Lara Chávez
- Written by: Hugo Lara, Claudia González-Rubio
- Screenplay by: Hugo Lara
- Starring: Fernando Luján; Cecilia Suárez; Carmen Maura; Irene Azuela; Diana Bovio; Erick Elias; Francisco de la Reguera
- Cinematography: Ramón Orozco Stoltenberg
- Edited by: Óscar Figueroa
- Music by: Jordi Bachbush; David Rodríguez
- Production companies: Invicta Films; Cosmopolitan Films
- Distributed by: Cinépolis Distribución
- Release date: 22 December 2017 (Mexico)
- Country: Mexico
- Language: Spanish

Cuando los hijos regresan is a 2017 Mexican comedy film directed by Hugo Lara Chávez, from a screenplay by Hugo Lara y Claudia González-Rubio. The film is inspired in the 1941 film titled Cuando los hijos se van by Juan Bustillo Oro, and in turn in the 1968 version of the same name of Julián Soler. It stars Fernando Luján, along to Cecilia Suárez, Irene Azuela, Carmen Maura, and Erick Elías. The film premiered on 22 December 2017 in Mexico.

== Cast ==
- Fernando Luján as Manuel
- Cecilia Suárez as Carlota
- Carmen Maura as Adelina
- Irene Azuela as Daniela
- Diana Bovio as Rosita
- Erick Elias as Chico
- Esmeralda Pimentel as Violeta
- Francisco de la Reguera as Rafis
- Roberto Quijano as Topoy
- Tina Romero as Lulú
- Tomás Rojas as Gilberto
- Anabel Ferreira as Lucía
