= Aventuras en el tiempo en vivo =

Aventuras En El Tiempo En Vivo

Soundtrack album by Aventuras En El Tiempo
- Released: 2001
- Recorded: August 10, 2001 (Mexico)
- Genres: Pop, latin pop
- Label: Fonovisa

Aventuras En El Tiempo chronology
Aventuras En El Tiempo (2001)	Aventuras En El Tiempo En Vivo (2001)

Aventuras En El Tiempo En Vivo is a second soundtrack for the Mexican television series Aventuras En El Tiempo ("Adventures In Time"), it was released in Mexico by Fonovisa. This was the second material recorded thanks to the same telenovela, the which contains themes different at previous, and something similar but in different versions, the sales were spectacular in the same way the big final of closing of the telenovela in the Fundidora Park in Monterrey. The CD contains the music in live from the serie performed for the cast, including Belinda, Christopher, Maribel Guardia, Ernesto D'alesio.

== Track listing ==
#	Title	Time
1.	Opening - Cue suspenso	1:16
2.	Aventuras En El Tiempo	2:39
3.	Amor Primero	4:25
4.	Para Siempre	3:52
5.	Dame Una Seña	3:51
6.	Somos Un Par De Locos	1:51
7.	Sólo Es Cosa De Bailar	3:15
8.	Popurrí (Tema De Neto, Tú Eres Quien, No Es Tan Fácil)	6:00
9.	Sabes (Tema de Paloma)	2:04
10.	Mi Estrella De Amor	3:15
11.	Perdóname	3:25
12.	Amigos, Amigos	3:21
13.	Si Nos Dejan	4:59
14.	De Niña A Mujer	3:29
15.	Bailar Contigo	2:56
16.	Todos Al Mismo Tiempo	3:42
17.	Aventuras En El Tiempo (Final)	3:49
