= Vanessa Bauche =

Mexican actress (born 1973)

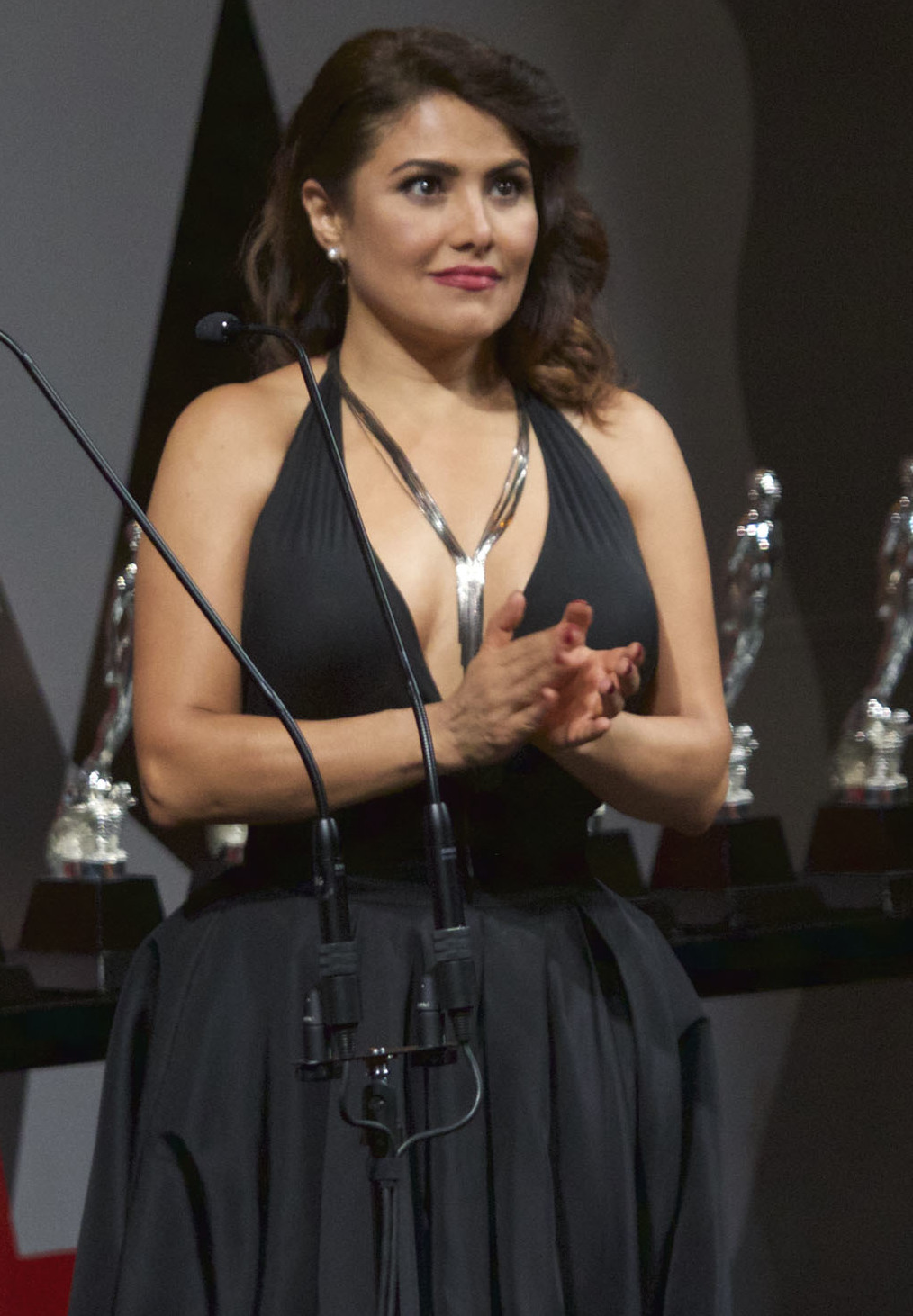
- Bauche in 2017
- Born: Alma Vanessa Bauche Chavira; February 18, 1973 (age 53); Mexico City, Mexico
- Occupation: Actress
- Years active: 1989–present

Vanessa Bauche (Spanish pronunciation: [baˈnesa ˈβawtʃe] born Alma Vanessa Bauche Chavira; February 18, 1973) is a Mexican television, theatre and film actress. She is best known for playing as Nora in the Apple TV+ series “Acapulco”. She also appeared in many Mexican television series and movies.

== Early life ==
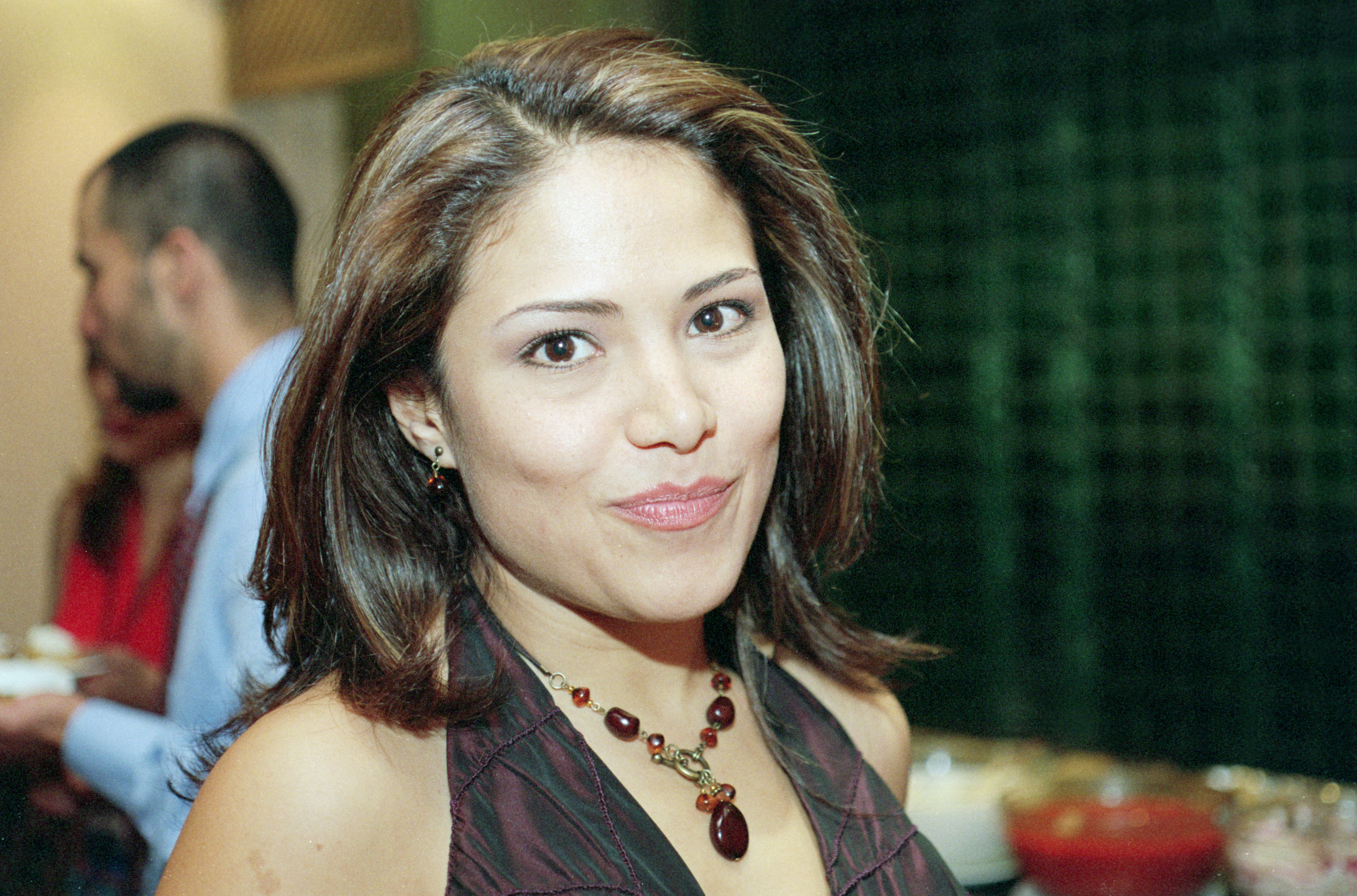
Bauche in 2010

Bauche was born Alma Vanessa Bauche Chavira, named after actress Vanessa Redgrave. Her father was a Romani who married her mother, a woman who aspired to be a dancer and singer. At the time of the marriage, her mother was sixteen years old and her father was a junior in high school. The couple divorced when Bauche was seven years old. After the divorce, she and her brother, Tito, spent three years traveling with their father. Eventually, she and her brother settled down with their mother in Mexico City.

== Career ==
She received her starring role in a film as a drug-addicted prostitute in El Patrullero (Highway Patrolman) (1991). After starring in a number of telenovelas she played a lead role in the international success Amores Perros (2000).

While Bauche has found success in both film and television, she also maintains a steady career in theater.

== Filmography ==
Television performance
Year	Title	Roles	Notes
1989	Simplemente María	Child Julia Carreño	
1996	Morir dos veces	Carla	
1997	La jaula de oro	Cristina Valdés	
2000–2004	Mujer, casos de la vida real	Various roles	12 episodes
2000	Amores Perros	Susana	
2000	Ramona	Margarita	
2004	A Silent Love	Gladys	
2008	Mujeres asesinas	Julia	Episode: "Ana, corrosiva"
2009	Ellas son, la alegría del hogar	Carmela	
2009	Hermanos y detectives	Doctora	Episode: "El caso Peralta"
2011	El encanto del águila	Mother Conchita	Episode: "El último Caudillo"
2012	Cloroformo	Mirella	
2015	El capitán Camacho	Brigida	
2016	Eva la trailera	Soraya Luna	Series regular; 116 episodes
2016–2017	Rosario Tijeras	Ruby Morales	Series regular (season 1); 48 episodes
2017	Su nombre era Dolores	Mari Urdaneta	Episodes: "Cervezas y diamantes" and "Sufriendo a solas"
2017	La doble vida de Estela Carrillo	Leticia	Series regular (season 1); 70 episodes
2018	Luis Miguel: The Series	Rosy Esquivel	Series regular (season 1); 10 episodes
2018	La jefa del campeón	Martina Morales	Series regular (season 1); 61 episodes
2019	Nosotros los guapos	Natacha	
2021	The War Next-door	Leonor Salcido	Main role
2026	Circo Gómez	Lupita Gómez	Voice role

== Awards and nominations ==
Ariel Award

- 1995: Nominated, "Best Supporting Actress" - Hasta morir
- 1999: Won, "Best Actress in a Minor Role" - Un embrujo
- 2002: Won, "Best Supporting Actress" - De la calle
- 2005: Nominated, "Best Actress" - Digna: Hasta el último aliento

Lleida Latin-American Film Festival

- 2006: Won, "Best Actress" - Al Otro Lado and Las vueltas del citrillo

Western Heritage Awards

- 2006: Won, "Outstanding Theatrical Motion Picture" - The Three Burials of Melquiades Estrada
