= Lety López =

Mexican actress

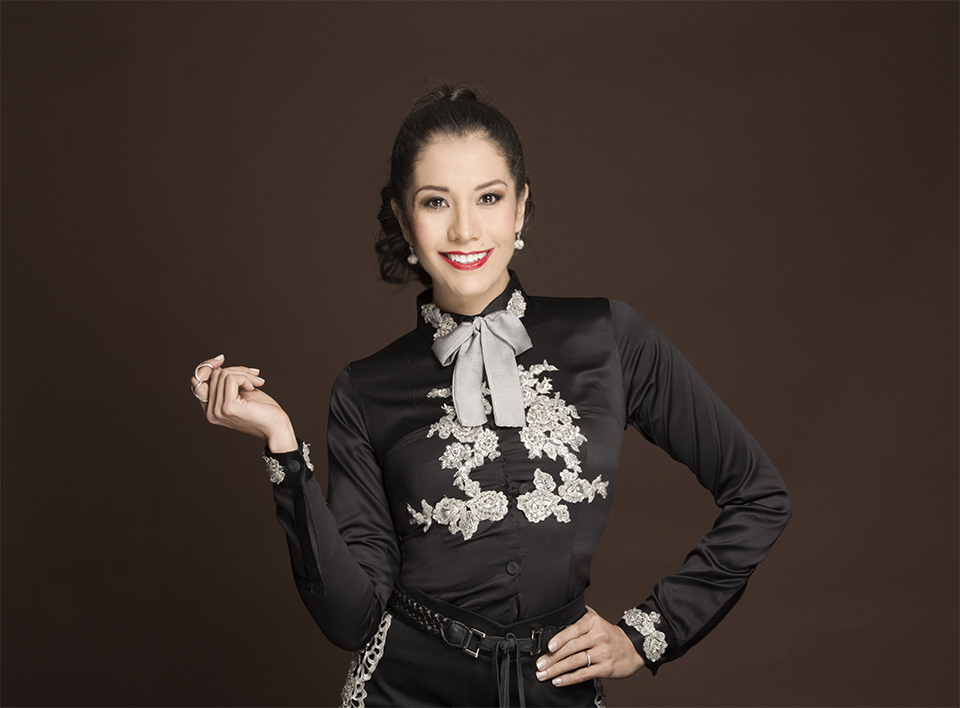
- Born: Guadalajara, Mexico
- Occupations: Actress; singer
- Years active: 2000–present
- Known for: La Academia, Mentiras el musical, Si Nos Dejan – El Gran Musical Mexicano
- Musical career
- Genres: Mariachi; Pop
- Instrument: Vocals
- Label: Independent
- Website: letylopezoficial.com

Leticia Jannet López Ramos, known professionally as Lety López (and formerly Leticia López), is a Mexican actress and singer. She was awarded with the Bravo, APT and ACPT awards for Best New Female Actress in a Musical in 2012 for her work in Si Nos Dejan – El Gran Musical Mexicano. She won a singing competition by multiple Grammy Award-winning mariachi artist Pepe Aguilar following a competition; Lety López opened for Aguilar during his 2014 concert dates and was awarded with a recording deal from Aguilar's record company.

She also placed fourth in La Academia, a Mexican musical talent show aired on TV Azteca in its 2004 season. She also played the roles of Dulce, Yuri and Lupita in Jose Manuel Lopez Velarde's musical Mentiras el musical, leading to her role in Si Nos Dejan – El Gran Musical Mexicano. She is also a voice actress, voicing the character of Skelita Calaveras in the Spanish-language version of Monster High.

== Life and career ==
Lety López was born in Guadalajara, Mexico. She was pursuing a degree in communications from the Western Institute of Technology and Higher Education (or the Instituto Tecnológico y de Estudios Superiores de Occidente) in Guadalajara, but she turned her attention to performing and trained in singing at the Center for Artistic Training West (Centro de Capacitación Artística de Occidente).

In 2004, she was part of the Mexican musical reality show La Academia and placed fourth. She later landed roles in the musical theater as Dulce, Yuri and Lupita in Jose Manuel Lopez Velarde's Mentiras el musical, one of the country's most successful musicals, from August 2009 to June 2011. Her association with Velarde would continue with Si Nos Dejan – El Gran Musical Mexicano, in the lead role of Paloma and toured with production throughout South America. López's work in Si Nos Dejan – El Gran Musical Mexicano won the ACPT (Agrupación de Críticos y Periodistas de Teatro or the Association of Theatre Critics and Journalists), APT (Agrupación de Periodistas Teatrales or the Association of Journalists) and Bravo awards for Best New Female Actress in a Musical in 2012. He participated in the London 2012 Olympic Games on TV Azteca, giving voice to a musical with Alejandra Ley called Londres Azteca.

In December 2013, Lety López won a singing competition held by Pepe Aguilar in Los Angeles. As winner of the competition, López was awarded with a record deal through Aguilar's record company and opened for his concerts in Mexico and the US in 2014. Lopez released Cuando Ama Una Mujer in September 2015, her first solo album, produced by Arturo G. Alvarez.

On 13 June 2015, she reportedly married Rolando Cortez at the Basilica of Our Lady of Zapopan.

She currently appeared in Vaselina USA (which toured in the US, playing at the Fox Performing Arts Center and Alex Theatre), and appeared in productions of The Jungle Book, Beauty and the Beast, The Wizard of Oz, as well as Jesus Christ Superstar. She toured in Japan, Germany, Argentina and Colombia and the US. She also voices the character of Skelita Calaveras in the Spanish-language version of Monster High and appeared in the first three episodes of the fourth season in the reality series Rica, Famosa, Latina.

In April 2018, Lopez released the single "Por Este Amor", a norteño and ranchera cover of a ballad originally performed by Banda MS written by Omar Tarazón. Pepe Garza, the program director of Los Angeles radio station KBUE ("Que Buena"), suggested Lopez cover the song.

In December 2018, she released "No Hacía Falta", written and composed by Naza Bañuelos and produced by Ismael Gallegos.

She is currently working on her unnamed album, produced by Pepe Aguilar. It is expected to be released in 2019.

== Discography ==
- Homenaje a Rocío Dúrcal: Nos nace del corazón (as Leticia López), 2006
- Cuando Ama Una Mujer (EP), 2017
- Por Este Amor (Single), 2018
- No Hacía Falta (Single), 2018
- No Me Llames (Single), 2019
- La Charreada (Single), 2019
- Si Dios Me Quita La Vida (Single), 2019
- Quédate Conmigo (Album), 2020
- Por Qué Me Enamoras (Single), (with Mariachi los Camperos), 2021
- Más Que Tu Amiga (Single), 2022
- No Te Equivoques (Single), 2023
- Viva México (Single), 2023
- Chiquitita (Single), 2024
- Un Consejo (Single), (with Lupita Infante), 2026
