= Ready to Mingle =

2019 Spanish-language film

- Film poster
- Spanish: Solteras
- Directed by: Luis Javier Henaine
- Written by: Luis Javier Henaine; Alejandra Olvera Avila
- Starring: Cassandra Ciangherotti; Gabriela de la Garza; Irán Castillo
- Distributed by: Netflix
- Release dates: March 10, 2019 (Guadalajara International Film Festival); June 7, 2019
- Running time: 96 minutes
- Country: Mexico
- Language: Spanish

Ready to Mingle (Spanish: Solteras, lit. 'Singles') is a 2019 Mexican romantic comedy film directed by Luis Javier Henaine, written by Luis Javier Henaine, Alejandra Olvera Avila and starring Cassandra Ciangherotti, Gabriela de la Garza and Irán Castillo. The plot revolves around Ana (Cassandra Ciangherotti) who in her search for a husband turns to a professional for help.

== Cast ==
- Cassandra Ciangherotti as Ana
- Gabriela de la Garza as Lucila
- Irán Castillo as Ilse
- Sophie Alexander-Katz as Sandra
- Flor Eduarda Gurrola as Lola
- Mariana Cabrera as Ema
- Juan Pablo Medina as Diego
- Pablo Cruz as Gabriel
- Diana Bovio as Julia
- Andrés Almeida as Emilio
- Mar Carrera as Mari
- Leonardo Daniel as Héctor
- Lucía Uribe Bracho as Tamara
- Tatiana del Real as Ingrid
- Francisco de la Reguera as Rodrigo
