= Tod@s caen =

- Directed by: Ariel Winograd
- Screenplay by: Cory Brusseau; Martha Higareda
- Starring: Martha Higareda; Omar Chaparro
- Cinematography: Juan José Saravia
- Edited by: Pablo Barbieri Carrera
- Music by: Milo Coello; Joselo Higareda
- Production company: Neverending Media
- Distributed by: Pantelion Films
- Release date: 20 September 2019 (Mexico)
- Running time: 120 minutes
- Country: Mexico
- Language: Spanish
- Box office: $9,667,157

Tod@s caen is a 2019 Mexican romantic comedy film directed by Ariel Winograd from a screenplay by Cory Brusseau, and Martha Higareda. The film premiered on 20 September 2019, and is stars Higareda, and Omar Chaparro, along to Miriam Higareda and Claudia Álvarez. The film is among the first and third place in the top of the highest-grossing film of 2019 in Mexico. .

== Plot ==
The story revolves around the story of Adan (Omar Chaparro) and Mia (Martha Higareda), two experts in love conquest strategies, who want to teach their respective friends the rules to win the game of flirting. Adam and Mia meet in a bar and, from there, they will use their techniques to fall in love. This will generate a series of fun entanglements and a power struggle, in which whoever falls in love first loses.

== Cast ==
- Martha Higareda as Mia
- Omar Chaparro as Adan
- Claudia Álvarez as Margo
- Miriam Higareda as Sam
- Tiaré Scanda as Vera
- Eugenio Siller as Esteban
- Edgar Vivar as Daniel
- Anabel Ferreira as Anabel
- Consuelo Duval as Graciela
- Francisco de la Reguera as Carlos
