= Francisco de la Reguera =

Mexican actor and director

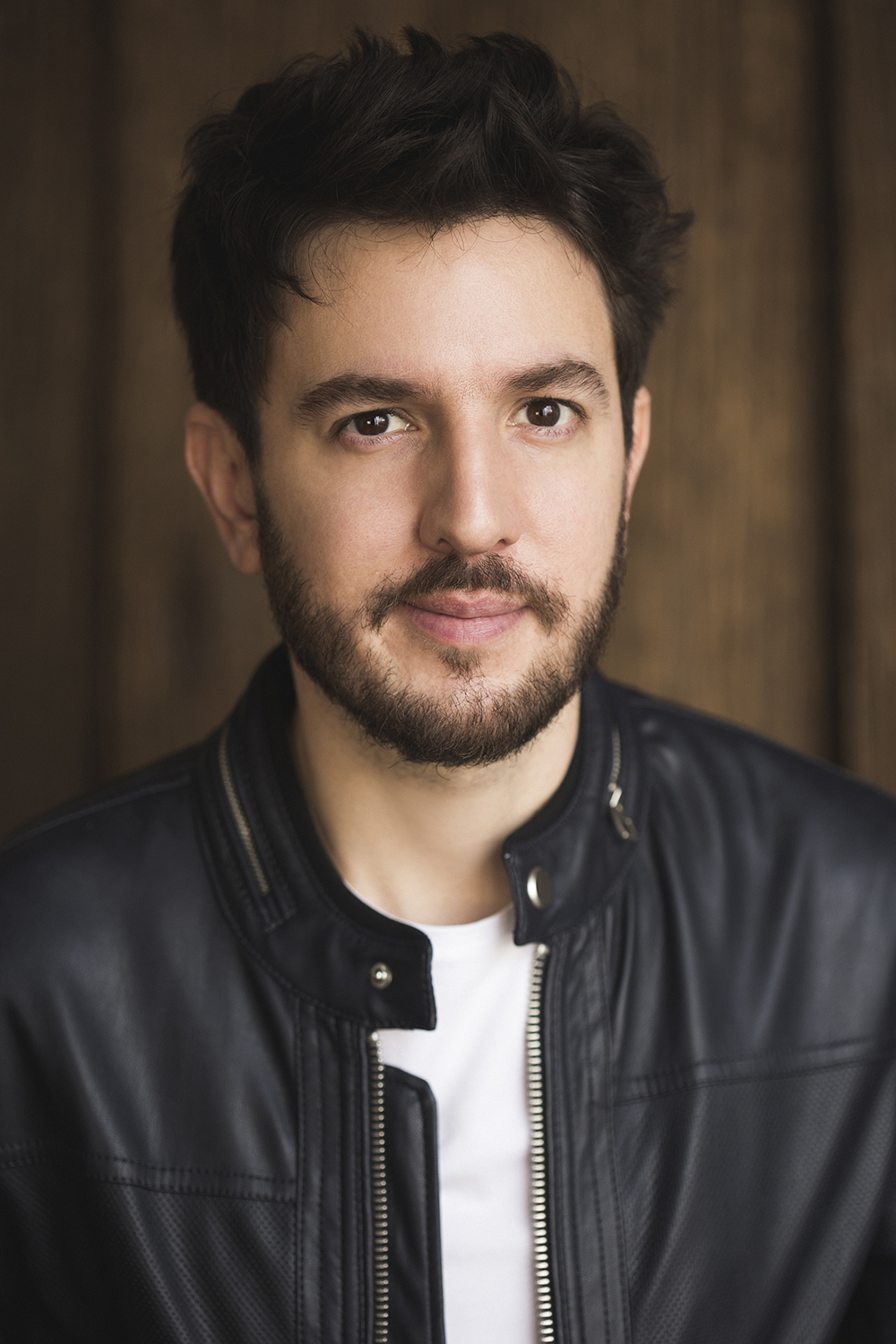
- Born: 9 August; Veracruz, Veracruz, Mexico
- Occupations: Actor, writer, director
- Years active: 2011-present

Francisco de la Reguera is a Mexican actor, screenwriter and director. De la Reguera is best known for his performances in the TV series Niño Santo, and The House of Flowers as well as the films Ready to mingle and The kids are back, which earned him a nomination in the 2018 Canacine Awards. In 2022, De la Reguera made his debut as creator and writer with the Disney+ Latin America streaming television series Los Hermanos Salvador.

== Filmography ==
=== Film ===
Year	Title	Role	Notes
2016	Compadres	Nuncio	
2016	Los Hermanos Salvador	Esteban Salvador	Short Film; Director, writer and producer
2017	The kids are back	Rafis	
2018	The Idol	Tomás Inclán	
2018	El amor dura tres meses	David	Short Film
2019	Ready to mingle	Rodrigo	
2019	Tod@s caen	Carlos	
2019	El hubiera sí existe	Ejecutivo	
2019	Tú y yo y nuestros mejores amigos	Fede	Short Film; Director, writer and producer
2020	Crisis resuelta	Adrián	Short Film
2021	Estepario	Ernesto	Short Film

=== Television ===
Year	Title	Role	Notes
2012	El Albergue	Inocencio	
2012	La ruta blanca	Hijo de Mastreta	
2011-2014	Niño Santo	Farca	
2013	Sr. Ávila	Assistante Sánchez	
2013	La serie gratis	Emi de las Disqueras	Web series
2015	El Torito	Rafa	
2017	Pedro lost his head	Pedro	Web series; Director, writer and producer
2018	The House of Flowers	Juanpi	
2019	Tijuana	Rodrigo	
2019	Sitiados: México	Liman	
2020	Sobreamor	Roberto	
2020	El Candidato	Alfredo Pineda	
2022	Los Hermanos Salvador	Esteban Salvador	Created by, writer and director
2022	Supertitlán	Darío	

== Awards ==
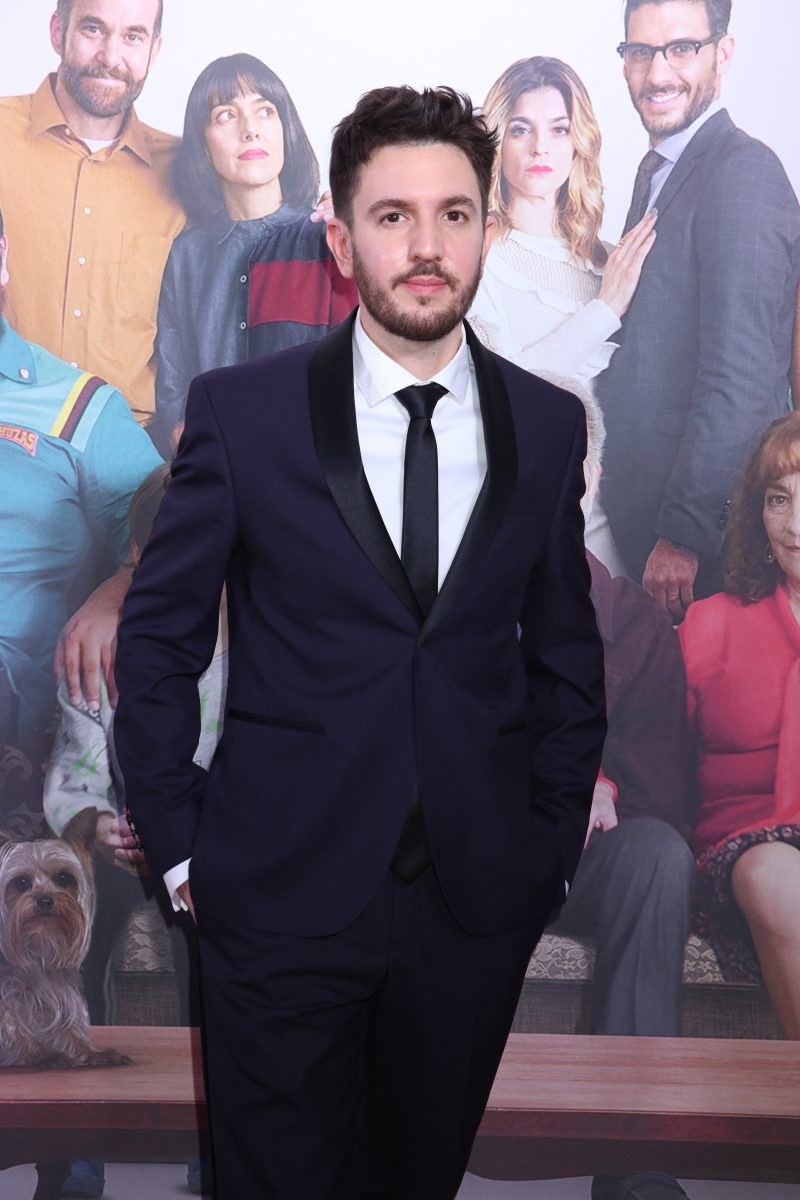
Francisco de la Reguera attends "The Kids Are Back" premiere

=== CANACINE ===
Year	Category	Title	Result	Ref
2018	Promesa Masculina	The kids are back	Nominated	

=== Rio Web Fest ===
Year	Category	Title	Result	Ref
2018	Best Original Idea	Pedro lost his head	Nominated	
2018	Best Ensemble Cast (Comedy)	Pedro lost his head	Nominated	

=== Anatolia International Film Festival ===
Year	Category	Title	Result	Ref
2021	Best lead actor	Estepario	Nominated	
