= Mariana Treviño =

Mexican actress (born 1977)

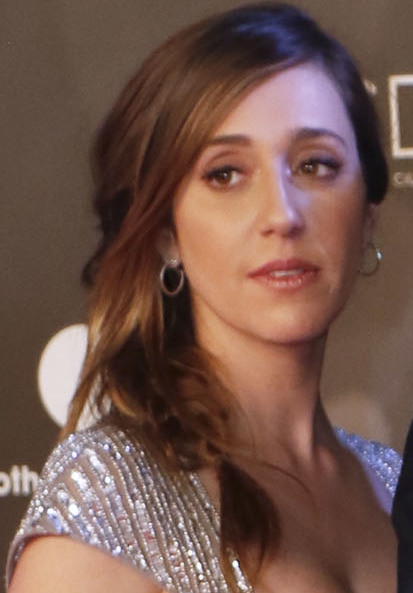
- Treviño in 2017
- Born: 21 November 1977 (age 48); Monterrey, Nuevo León, Mexico
- Occupation: Actress
- Years active: 2010–present

Mariana Treviño Ortiz (born 21 November 1977) is a Mexican stage and screen actress from Monterrey. She became known to a wider domestic audience through her role as Lupita in the popular jukebox musical Mentiras, which she played in over a thousand performances. Following the success of Mentiras, Treviño went on to appear in Mexican comedy films such as No sé si cortarme las venas o dejármelas largas (2013) and Amor de Mis Amores (2014).

== Career ==
She co-starred with Luis Gerardo Méndez in Netflix's first ever Spanish-language original production Club de Cuervos, which ran for 4 seasons from 2015-2019.

In 2022, Treviño co-starred with Tom Hanks in Sony Pictures' A Man Called Otto. Director Marc Forster noted that he was "blown away" by her audition tape, which was recorded on her phone from a hotel room in Spain.

Treviño returned to her role as Lupita Romo, one of the four main characters in the Mexican jukebox musical Mentiras, El Musical, in Mentiras, The Series on Amazon Prime Video. She was an original cast member of the stage show and played the character of Lupita in over a thousand performances from 2009-2012. Mentiras, The Series premiered on 13 June 2025.

Treviño next co-starred with Owen Wilson and Marc Maron in the Apple TV+ sports comedy series Stick in 2025.

== Partial filmography ==
- Cuestión de Corbatas (2012) - Natalia
- Alguien más (2013) - Katy
- Tercera Llamada (2013) - Ceci "La Asistonta"
- No sé si cortarme las venas o dejármelas largas (2013) - Carmela
- Amor de Mis Amores (2014) - Shaila
- Club de Cuervos (2015) - Isabel Iglesias
- Una última y nos vamos (2015) - Hilda
- Sabrás Qué Hacer Conmigo (2016)
- El Sueño del Mara'akame (2016)
- La vida inmoral de la pareja ideal (2016)
- Como Cortar a tu Patán (2017) - Amanda
- Overboard (2018) - Sofia
- Eres mi pasión (2018) - Luli
- Perfect Strangers (2018) - Flora
- La liga de los 5 (2019)
- The House of Flowers (2019–2020) - Jenny Quetzal
- Powder (2019) - Jacinta
- Narcos Mexico (2020)
- 100 días para enamorarnos (2020) - Remedios
- A Man Called Otto (2022) - Marisol
- Stick (2025) - Elena
- Mentiras, la serie (2025) - Lupita

== Theatre credits ==
- Mentiras, el musical - Lupita

== Accolades ==
Treviño received two nominations at the 59th Ariel Awards, for Best Supporting Actress for La vida inmoral de la pareja ideal, and Best Actress in a Minor Role for El Sueño del Mara'akame.
