= Gustavo Aguilar =

Mexican actor and wrestler (died 2007)

Gustavo Aguilar Tejada (died 24 September 2007) was a Mexican actor and former professional wrestler known as El Manotas.

== Life ==
Wrestling led to acting roles and he joined the National Association of Actors (ANDA) in 1986. He was primarily known for his role as the father of the Devil in numerous Eugenio Derbez comedies, but also was a featured actor in many telenovelas as well. He died of kidney failure on 24 September 2007.
