= Arturo G. Álvarez =

Arturo G. Alvarez
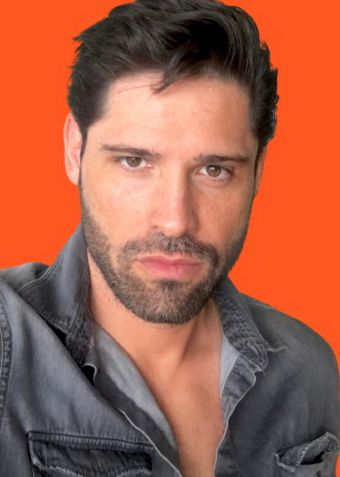

Background information
- Born: Arturo G. Alvarez; 20 December
- Genres: Pop, Hip Hop-Rap, Classical, Jazz, Rock, Instrumental, Dance, Electronic, Film Soundtrack
- Occupations: International Music Producer, Artist, Mastering Engineer, Musician, Composer
- Instruments: Vocals, guitar, piano
- Years active: 1994–present
- Labels: Sony Music Entertainment, Universal Records, Sony Music Austria, HRT, Velas Galeao.

Arturo G. Álvarez (known as Arturo Alvarez) is an international music producer, mastering engineer, A&R representative, and artist.From USA Los Angeles. He has multiple awards and has worked with finalists from Eurovision Song Contest, as well as his own independent works. He is a member of the National Academy of Recording Arts and Sciences.

Alvarez produced the 2016 Lety Lopez album ¨Cuando Ama Una Mujer¨ featuring composer and performer Erika Vidrio, who also composed many of the songs on the album.

In 2017 Alvarez released Joey Lawrence´s comeback record ¨Imagine¨. The record release was proceeded by the release of the first single on the LP ¨Girl¨. The single was followed with the release of Side A of ¨Imagine¨, with Side B to be released at a later date.

He specializes in recording and marketing artists for the international market, including Brazil, as well as the rest of Latin America and all of Europe. Arturo G Alvarez uses Analog recording as well as digital, and is noted for producing Pop rock, Rock music, Alternative rock, Hip hop, and Rap music, sometimes in multiple language editions including English, Spanish, Portuguese, Croatian, Bosnian, and Macedonian, among others.

Alvarez has mastered songs for big stars like Paul Oakenfold, Joey Lawrence, Sonora Dinamita , Natalia Jiménez, Joss Favela, Christian Castro, Alexander Acha, Emmanuel, Yuri, Francisco Cespedes, Ivan Barrera David Cavazos ( No Pal project ),Elena Risteska, Fela Dominguez, Dr. Shenka, Mario Frangoulis, Ana Barbara, Mariana Seoane, Suzie Del Vecchio, Adam White among many others. Alvarez produced the record Blagoslov with producer Bruno Krajcar for Sony Austria and Croatia Records. He was an honorary performer at the Song Festival of Kastav in 2006 with Alen Vitasovic and Mario Battifiaca. He is featured on the 2011 album Istrael, recorded and produced by artist Bruno Krajcar, performing the single "Roza" in Spanish.

Álvarez masters for Vinyl records, CD, Cassettes and also mixes in Dolby Atmos for music, films, video games etc.

== Early life and career ==
Arturo G. Alvarez started his career as a performer in 1994 when he was cast in Grease (musical) at the Hidalgo Theater in Mexico City by Julissa, the producer and adaptor of the musical. In 1999, Alvarez signed as exclusive artist of Sony Music Mexico, and released his first album Serenata.
