= Amigos X Siempre (soundtrack) =

¡Amigos X Siempre!

Soundtrack album by Amigos X Siempre
- Released: February 17, 2000 (MEX); October 24, 2000 (US)
- Recorded: 2000
- Genres: Pop, latin pop
- Length: 39:04
- Labels: Sony BMG, RCA International
- Producer: Alejandro Abaroa

¡Amigos X Siempre! is a soundtrack for the Mexican television series ¡Amigos X Siempre! ("Friends 4 Ever"), it was released in Mexico by Sony BMG.

== Information ==
The CD contains the music from the series performed for the cast, including Belinda, Martín Ricca, Ernesto Laguardia, Adriana Fonceca and the "Amigos X Siempre": Ronald, Oscar, Daniela, Naidelyn, Christopher, Griselle Margarita and Mickey. The soundtrack was certified platinum in Mexico.

== Track listing ==
No.	Title	Writer(s)	Length
1.	"Amigos X Siempre"	Alejandro Abaroa, Jesús Flores "La Bota"	3:16
2.	"La Fuerza de la Amistad"	Alejandro Abaroa, Jesús Flores "La Bota"	2:50
3.	"Mi Ángel de Amor"	Eduardo Meza Rodríguez	3:22
4.	"Pasó, Pasó"	Alejandro Abaroa, Christina Abaroa, Claudia Brant	3:08
5.	"Te Extraño"	Christina Abaroa, Alejandro Abaroa, Pablo Aguirre, Claudia Brant	3:14
6.	"El Ritmo de La Vida"	Christina Abaroa, Alejandro Abaroa, Pablo Aguirre	4:02
7.	"Cuestión de Tiempo"	Christina Abaroa, Alejandro Abaroa, Pablo Aguirre	3:11
8.	"Dame Una Salida"	Christina Abaroa, Alejandro Abaroa, Pablo Aguirre	3:07
9.	"Alcanzar la Libertad"	Alejandro Abaroa, Jesús Flores "La Bota"	3:00
10.	"Todo Puede Suceder"	Alejandro Abaroa, Alejandro Carballo, Luis Ángel Pastor	3:45
11.	"Pacto de Amor"	Christina Abaroa, Alejandro Abaroa, Jesús Flores "La Bota"	3:28
12.	"Himno del Heróico Instituto Vidal"	Alejandro Abaroa	2:41
Total length:			39:04

== Charts and certifications ==
=== Charts ===
Chart (2003)	Peak position
U.S. Top Latin Albums	47
U.S. Latin Pop Albums	15

=== Certifications ===
Region	Certification	Certified units/sales
Mexico (AMPROFON)	Platinum	280,000
