= Amigos x siempre =

- Genre: Telenovela
- Directed by: Gilberto Macin
- Starring: Ernesto Laguardia; Adriana Fonseca; Martín Ricca; Carmen Montejo; Odiseo Bichir; Rebecca Mankita; Germán Robles; Héctor Ortega; Belinda
- Theme music composer: Alejandro Abaroa
- Opening theme: Amigos X Siempre by Belinda & Martín Ricca
- Country of origin: Mexico
- Original language: Spanish
- No. of episodes: 115

Production
- Executive producer: Rosy Ocampo
- Producer: Eduardo Meza
- Production locations: Filming; Televisa San Ángel; Mexico City, Mexico
- Camera setup: Multi-camera
- Running time: 41-44 minutes
- Production company: Televisa

Original release
- Network: Canal de las Estrellas
- Release: January 10 – June 16, 2000

Amigos x siempre (English title: Friends 4 Ever) is a Mexican children's telenovela produced by Rosy Ocampo for Televisa that premiered on January 10, 2000 and ended on June 16, 2000. The story is set at a prestigious, but rigid and repressive school called Instituto Vidal, where a group of children from a variety of backgrounds form a special friendship, using music as their bond. It stars Adriana Fonseca (later replaced by Lourdes Reyes), Ernesto Laguardia, Martín Ricca, Carmen Montejo, Odiseo Bichir, Rebecca Mankita, Héctor Ortega and Belinda.

== Plot ==
Ana is a sweet and intelligent 10-year-old girl who has been affected by the death of her mother. She has been rendered virtually speechless by the trauma, though she expresses herself through music and possesses an extraordinary ability to move objects with her mind. Ana's grandmother, Julia Vidal, is the owner and headmistress of Instituto Vidal. Julia was once kind but has now turned into a bitter woman following the death of her husband and her daughter, Laura. Ana's unscrupulous father, Francisco Capistrán, has taken advantage of the situation to try to steal Julia's school. The timely arrival of Ana's uncle, Salvador, Amanda and their adopted son, Pedro, changes everything. Pedro, a fish out-of-water, refuses to follow the rigid rules of the school. Ana's lonely life takes an unexpected turn for the better and she regains her joy in a series of adventures with Pedro and their group of friends.

The group includes, Santiago, a spoiled rich kid raised by his maid; Lourdes, a shy girl, who devotes most of her time attending her Down Syndrome brother, Carlitos, who tries to show everyone even mentally disabled children have feelings and can contribute to society; Patricia a lonely girl who dreams of becoming rich, at any cost; Gilberto, a boy with a speech disorder that causes shame to his self-absorbed parents; Renata, tries hard to win the affection of her father, whom believes that women are worthless; "El 7 Leguas" a poor boy, who is not allowed to attend a prestigious school, he is loyal and inventive, and Rafa, a chubby boy in love with Patricia.

== Cast ==
=== Main ===
- Ernesto Laguardia as Salvador Vidal Ruvalcaba
- Adriana Fonseca as Melissa Escobar #1
- Martín Ricca as Pedro Vidal Naredo
- Lourdes Reyes as Melissa Escobar #2
- Carmen Montejo as Doña Julia Ruvalcaba Vda. de Vidal
- Odiseo Bichir as Francisco Capistrán
- Rebeca Mankita as Amanda Naredo de Vidal
- Germán Robles as Neftalí Güemes
- Héctor Ortega as Crispín Ávila
- Yolanda Mérida as Brígida Escobar
- Bárbara Ferré as "La Nena" de Sánchez-Gavito
- Oscar Traven as Ernesto Sánchez-Gavito
- Marcela Páez as Isabel Gamba de Egurrola
- Juan Carlos Bonet as Javier Egurrola
- Lucía Guilmáin as Teacher Victoria
- Julio Mannino as Marcos
- Vanessa Angers as Claudia Hernández
- Humberto Dupeyrón as Teacher Arnulfo
- Julio Monterde as Teacher Félix
- Eugenio Bartilotti as Agent Hipólito "Triple Cero"
- Gerardo Camarena as Agent Doble Cero
- Lisette Sáez as Merlina
- Francisco Rosell as Teacher Gonzalo
- Jose Magaña as Hans
- Maripaz García as Elizabeth
- Oscar Morelli as Máximo
- Belinda as Ana Capistrán Vidal
- Christopher von Uckermann as Santiago del Valle Villareal
- Daniela Mercado as Lourdes Egurrola Gamba
- Grisel Margarita as Patricia Hernández
- Mickey Santana as Gilberto Sánchez-Gavito
- Naydelin Navarrete as Renata Sánchez-Gavito
- Oscar Larios as Juan "El 7 Leguas"
- Pablo Tableros as Carlitos Egurrola Gamba
- Ronald Duarte as Rafa Núñez Saldívar

=== Recurring and guest stars ===
The children's cast of Amigos x siempre

- Susan Vohn as Laura Vidal Ruvalcaba de Capistrán
- Amparo Arozamena as Doña Virginia
- Mariagna Prats as Olga
- Juan Carlos Casasola as Fernando
- Héctor Gómez as Alfonso
- Alfonso Mier y Terán as Nico
- Queta Lavat as Mother Superior
- Dolores Salomón "Bodokito" as Nun Pilar
- Alberto Inzúa as Darío Ruiz Sandoval
- Alexis Ayala as Manuel Ruiz Sandoval
- Raúl Magaña as Gerardo
- Hernán Prado as Enrique Buendía
- Pablo Poumian as Jaime Ávila "El Tocacintas"
- Gabriel Ramos Villalpando as Alex
- Enrique Sánchez as "El Nopal"
- Montserrat Campos Rivera as "La Chilis"
- Aarón González as "El Mocos"
- Silvia Lomelí as Radio hostess
- Ariel López Padilla as himself
- Arturo Peniche as himself
- Karla Álvarez as herself
- Yamil Sesin
- Diego Sieres
- Banda El Recodo
- Tierra Cero

== Discography ==
- ¡Amigos X Siempre! (album)
- ¡Amigos x siempre! en la ruta de la amistad

== Awards and nominations ==
| Year | Award | Category | Nominee | Result |
|---|---|---|---|---|
| 2001 | 19th TVyNovelas Awards | Best Actor | Ernesto Laguardia | Nominated |
| 2001 | 19th TVyNovelas Awards | Best Antagonist Actor | Odiseo Bichir | Nominated |
| 2001 | 19th TVyNovelas Awards | Best Leading Actress | Carmen Montejo | Nominated |
| 2001 | 19th TVyNovelas Awards | Best Female Revelation | Belinda | Nominated |
| 2001 | 19th TVyNovelas Awards | Best Child Performance | Belinda | Won |
| 2001 | Palmas de Oro Awards | Best Child Actress | Belinda | Won |
| 2001 | Eres Awards | Best Singer and Actress | Belinda | Won |
