= Vanusa =

Brazilian singer (1947–2020)

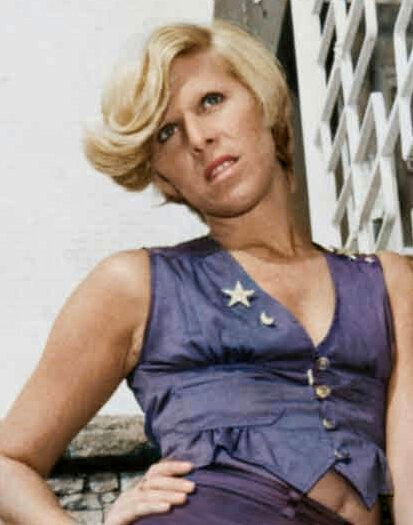

Background information
- Born: Vanusa Santos Flores; 22 September 1947; Cruzeiro, São Paulo, Brazil
- Died: 8 November 2020 (aged 73) Santos, São Paulo, Brazil
- Genres: Pop rock, MPB
- Years active: 1966–2020
- Labels: RCA Victor, Continental Records, Som Livre, Copacabana Records

Vanusa Santos Flores (Portuguese: [vaˈnuzɐ]; 22 September 1947 – 8 November 2020) was a Brazilian singer, linked to the Jovem Guarda movement. She released many solo albums, most of them self-titled. She was married to Antônio Marcos (1945-1992).

== Career ==
The guitar riff from the song "What To Do," from Vanusa vol. III has been accused of having been copied by Black Sabbath for their title track on Sabbath Bloody Sabbath, released months after Vanusa's song in 1973.. In March 2009, she sang the Brazilian National Anthem at the Legislative Assembly of São Paulo. Accompanied by a couple of musicians, she committed many lyrical mistakes during her performance and ended up singing out of rhythm. Attenders of the show tried to prevent her from continuing by applauding before the end of the presentation, and she kept on singing until the presenter eventually thanked Vanusa for her performance, with her still singing on the background. She later stated that she was confused because of the medicine she took that morning for her labyrinthitis, and said she would hire a lawyer to have any suggestions that she was drunk removed from the internet.

== Discography ==
- 1968 – Vanusa
- 1969 – Vanusa vol.2
- 1971 – Vanusa vol.3
- 1973 – Vanusa vol.4
- 1974 – Vanusa vol.5
- 1975 – Amigos Novos E Antigos
- 1977 – Trinta Anos
- 1977 – Cinderela 77 – Participação na tilha sonora da novela Cinderela 77
- 1979 – Viva Vanusa
- 1980 – Vanusa vol.6
- 1981 – Vanusa vol.7
- 1982 – Primeira Estrela
- 1985 – Vanusa vol.8
- 1986 – Mudanças
- 1988 – Cheiro De Luz
- 1991 – Viva Paixão
- 1994 – Hino Ao Amor
- 1997 – A Arte Do Espetáculo
- 2004 – Diferente
- 2013 – Estrada de Bênçãos
