= Mentiras, la serie =

- Genre: Jukebox musical; Comedy-drama
- Based on: Mentiras, el musical by José Manuel López Velarde
- Developed by: Gabriel Ripstein
- Written by: Gabriel Ripstein; Ilse Apellaniz; Natalia García Agraz
- Directed by: Gabriel Ripstein
- Starring: Belinda; Diana Bovio; Regina Blandón; Mariana Treviño; Luis Gerardo Méndez
- Country of origin: Mexico
- Original language: Spanish
- No. of seasons: 1
- No. of episodes: 8

Production
- Executive producers: Gabriel Ripstein; Gerardo Gatica González; Luis Gerardo Méndez; José Manuel López Velarde
- Producer: Andrea Gamboa
- Cinematography: Emiliano Villanueva
- Editor: Miguel Musálem
- Production companies: Cine Vaquero; Pez Caja

Original release
- Network: Amazon Prime Video
- Release: 13 June 2025

Mentiras, la serie is a Mexican jukebox musical comedy-drama television series based on the musical of the same name by José Manuel López Velarde. It premiered on Amazon Prime Video on 13 June 2025. The series stars Belinda, Diana Bovio, Regina Blandón, Mariana Treviño and Luis Gerardo Mendez.

== Plot ==
Set in the 1980s, the series revolves around four women: Daniela, Dulce, Yuri and Lupita, who meet at the funeral of Emmanuel Mijares. As they become acquainted, they discover that they were all in a romantic relationship with him at the same time, which makes them the main suspects in his death. Through flashbacks and musical performances, each tells her version of their relationship and deceptions.

== Cast ==
- Belinda as Daniela Levy de Mijares
- Diana Bovio as Dulce D'Alessio
- Regina Blandón as Yuri Bosé
- Mariana Treviño as Lupita Romo
- Luis Gerardo Méndez as Emmanuel Mijares

== Episodes ==
No.	Title	Original release date
1	"Lies"	13 June 2025
2	"Jackals, Beavers, and Parasites"	13 June 2025
3	"Behind a Great Man"	13 June 2025
4	"Quadratic Equations"	13 June 2025
5	"Boozy Night"	13 June 2025
6	"Nutty Night"	13 June 2025
7	"Confessions"	13 June 2025
8	"Truths"	13 June 2025

== Production ==
The series was announced on 11 March 2024, with Belinda, Luis Gerardo Mendez, Diana Bovio, Mariana Treviño and Regina Blandón cast in the lead roles. Filming ended after 75 days on 5 June 2024.
