= Aventuras en el tiempo (soundtrack) =

Aventuras En El Tiempo

Soundtrack album by Aventuras En El Tiempo
- Released: July 31, 2001
- Recorded: 2001
- Genres: Pop, latin pop
- Length: 39:54
- Label: Fonovisa
- Producer: Alejandro Abaroa

Aventuras En El Tiempo chronology
| Aventuras En El Tiempo (2001) | Aventuras En El Tiempo En Vivo (2001) |

Aventuras En El Tiempo is a soundtrack for the Mexican television series Aventuras En El Tiempo ("Adventures In Time"), it was released in Mexico by Fonovisa on July 31, 2001.

== Information ==
The CD contains the music from the series performed for the cast, including Belinda, Christopher, Maribel Guardia, Ernesto D'alesio. The soundtrack was certified 2× Gold in Mexico.

== Track listing ==
| No. | Title | Writer(s) | Performer(s) | Length |
|---|---|---|---|---|
| 1. | "Aventuras en el Tiempo" | Christina Abaroa, Alejandro Abaroa, Pablo Aguirre | Belinda & Christopher | 2:40 |
| 2. | "Dame Una Seña" | Christina Abaroa, Alejandro Abaroa, Pablo Aguirre | Belinda | 3:46 |
| 3. | "Perdóname" | Alejandro Abaroa, Alejandro Carballo | Maribel Guardia | 3:23 |
| 4. | "Amor Primero" | Alejandro Abaroa, Alejandro Carballo | Belinda y Christopher | 3:51 |
| 5. | "Sólo Es Cosa De Bailar" | Alejandro Abaroa, Pablo Aguirre | Ernesto D'alessio | 2:59 |
| 6. | "Si Nos Dejan" | José Alfredo Jiménez | Belinda | 3:12 |
| 7. | "Mi Estrella De Amor" | Alejandro Abaroa, Alejandro Carballo | Christopher | 3:11 |
| 8. | "Para Siempre" | Christina Abaroa, Alejandro Abaroa, Pablo Aguirre | Maribel Guardia | 3:37 |
| 9. | "Bailar Contigo" | Alejandro Abaroa, Alejandro Carballo | Christopher | 2:54 |
| 10. | "Amigos, Amigos" | Christina Abaroa, Alejandro Abaroa, Pablo Aguirre | Aventuras en el Tiempo | 3:15 |
| 11. | "De Niña A Mujer" | Christina Abaroa, Alejandro Abaroa, Pablo Aguirre | Belinda | 3:31 |
| 12. | "Todos Al Mismo Tiempo" | Christina Abaroa, Alejandro Abaroa | Aventuras en el Tiempo | 3:31 |
| 13. | "Track Interactivo" |

== Certifications ==
| Region | Certification | Certified units/sales |
|---|---|---|
| Mexico (AMPROFON) | 2× Gold | 175,000 |
