= Diana Bovio =

Mexican actress (born 1989)

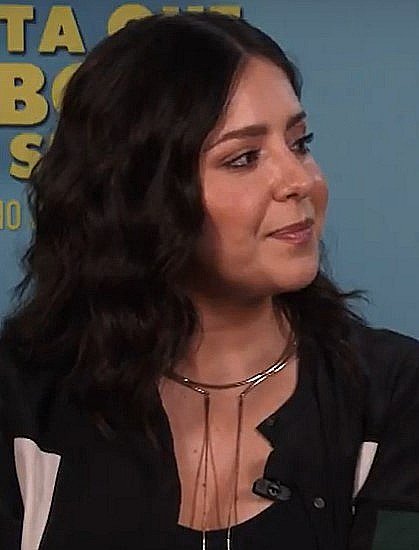
- Bovio in 2018
- Born: 28 February 1989 (age 37); Monterrey, Nuevo Leon, Mexico
- Occupation: Actress
- Years active: 2009–present
- Relatives: Marcela Bovio (sister)

Diana Bovio (born 28 February 1989) is a Mexican actress known in her native country for her roles in Mexican films. Bovio began her career as a stage actress in productions such as Los Bonobos, Verdad o reto and Forever Young, Never Alone. Her first starring role was in 2016 in the Mexican horror film 1974: La posesión de Altair. The independent film had great acceptance by specialized critics, and won several awards for its passage through international festivals. For the film Hasta que la boda nos separe, Bovio was nominated for Best Actress for a Canacine Award. She was also nominated for Best Actress in an Ibero-American film at the Fantaspoa International Film Festival.

== Filmography ==
Film roles
Year	Title	Roles	Notes
2009	Princesa en la torre	Rebeca	Short film
2011	From Prada to Nada	Classmate	
2015	Huevos, jefe	Fernalgas	Voice role; short film
2016	1974: La posesión de Altair	Altair	
2017	Cuando los hijos regresan	Rosita	
2018	Hasta que la boda nos separe	María	
2018	La última y nos vamos	María	Short film
2019	Mirreyes contra Godínez	Nancy	
2019	Solteras	Julia	
2020	Cindy La Regia	Estrella	
2022	Love & Mathematics	Mónica	
2022	Mirreyes contra Godínez 2: El retiro	Nancy	
2023	¿Cómo matar a mamá?	Camila	
2025	Mirreyes contra Godínez: Las Vegas	Nancy	

Television roles
Year	Title	Roles	Notes
2010	Morir en Martes	Vanesa	7 episodes
2011	Bienes raíces	Eli	Episode: "Apariencias"
2013	Saturday Night Live Mexico	Herself	Episode: "Pilot"
2019	Los pecados de Bárbara	Bárbara	Main role
2024	Y llegaron de noche	Carmen Guerrero	Main cast
2025	Mentiras, la serie	Dulce	Main cast
2026	Circo Gómez	Vicky Gómez	Voice role

Other appearances
Year	Title	Roles	Notes
2006	Live in the Real World	Herself	Guest vocals; album from Stream of Passion
