= Porcelain Black =

American singer-songwriter (born 1985)

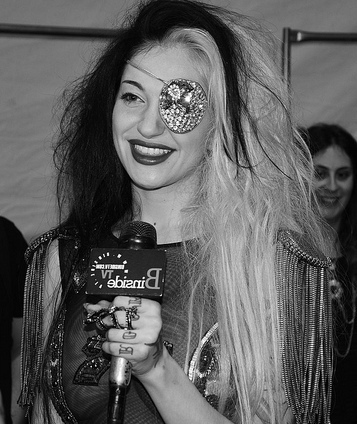
- Porcelain Black at the Falguni and Shane Peacock Spring 2012 fashion show

Background information
- Also known as: Porcelain and the Tramps
- Born: Alaina Marie Beaton; October 1, 1985 (age 41); Detroit, Michigan, U.S.
- Genres: Dance-pop; electronic rock; industrial pop; alternative
- Occupations: Singer-songwriter; rapper; dancer
- Instruments: Vocals; piano
- Years active: 2006–present
- Labels: Virgin; 2101; Universal Republic; Capitol; Cash Money; Young Money

Alaina Marie Beaton (born October 1, 1985), known professionally as Porcelain Black, is an American singer-songwriter and rapper. At age 16, she embarked on her music career as a solo act under the name Porcelain and the Tramps with Virgin Records. However, Black and Virgin could not agree on the music she would record. Her music was posted to her Myspace account, "rockcitynosebleed", where she gained millions of hits. After three years of trying to get out of the contract, she signed with RedOne's Universal Republic imprint, 2101 Records, late in 2009, and began working on her debut album. After many internal problems between the artist and record producer RedOne, Porcelain Black announced the partnership had come to an end, with anticipation of releasing her debut album in the vein of her Porcelain and the Tramps project in 2015.

She appeared in the music video for Jack White's "Freedom at 21". As a songwriter, she is credited on songs performed by One Direction, Orianthi, The Used and Mexican pop singer Belinda, among others. As a solo act, she has released four singles, "This Is What Rock n' Roll Looks Like", "Naughty Naughty", "One Woman Army", and "Fling", the first featuring guest vocals from Lil Wayne. The first two songs charted on the Billboard Hot Dance Club Songs chart. "One Woman Army" was a top-forty hit in France, Spain, and Wallonia, outselling all of her previous singles in France and becoming her first number-one hit on that country's iTunes chart. After the release of her first single, Lil Wayne invited her on the second half of his I Am Music Tour as an opening act. She made her first televised appearance on the Late Show with David Letterman, performing "This Is What Rock n' Roll Looks Like".

Musically, she fuses industrial themes with pop music conventions such as electronic synths and a heavy reliance upon hooks. She is best known for her guttural vocals and two-toned hair. She considers her music the "love child" of Marilyn Manson and Britney Spears. Vocally compared to Courtney Love, Porcelain Black was approached to record backing vocals for Love's 2008 album.

== Life and career ==
=== Early life and career beginnings ===
Black grew up in and spent most of her life in various parts of Metro Detroit, Michigan. Her mother is an accountant; her father was a hairstylist. Her mother is of Polish descent and her father is Scottish-Albanian. He owned a hair salon and brought her along to fashion shows and photoshoots. Her parents separated when she was six years old. After her mother remarried, they moved from Royal Oak and settled in Rochester where she attended high school at Bishop Foley Catholic High School. At age fifteen, she was expelled for fighting and attended Rochester High School where she was also soon expelled, for the same reason. Until the age of sixteen, when she was legally able to drop out, she feigned homeschooling. Having lived in less affluent areas prior to the move, Black found that she did not fit in with her privileged classmates, becoming an outcast. Her father died when she was sixteen.

Black had taken part in national competitive dancing, taking jazz, hip-hop, tap, and ballet lessons, since she was young, and, at one point, was training to perform on Broadway. She also considered becoming a backup dancer.

=== 2006–2009: Porcelain and the Tramps ===
While on a road trip in New York, Black was approached by her first manager, who told her to move to Los Angeles. Three months later, she did so, found her manager, and was signed to Virgin Records two weeks later. Recording under the pseudonym "Porcelain and the Tramps", Black worked with Tommy Henriksen and John Lowery in London while at Virgin. However, she and the label could not agree on the music she made. Virgin wanted Black to record pop music in the vein of Avril Lavigne, despite already knowing what kind of music she made when signing her. She also faced skepticism from her collaborators, who questioned her desire to mix industrial rock sounds with dance pop. Black began posting the songs she recorded on Myspace, gaining upwards of 10 million views in a matter of months.

She co-wrote and sang backup vocals for the song "Lunacy Fringe" by The Used. She was approached by Courtney Love on MySpace to provide backing vocals for a solo album she was working on. She was also featured on a song by the Street Drum Corps's "Action!". "How Do You Love Someone?", co-written by Black, Billy Steinberg, and Josh Alexander around the time Black left Virgin, was recorded by Ashley Tisdale for her second album, Guilty Pleasure. Black was initially reluctant to give the song away, but relented and later recorded the song for her own album with production from RedOne.

=== 2009–2014: Mannequin Factory ===
Through a mutual A&R friend, producer RedOne heard about Black and was interested in meeting her. He asked to meet Black in his studio in November 2009, which led to them writing her debut single "This Is What Rock n' Roll Looks Like" the next day. RedOne helped Black break away from her contract with Virgin Records and signed her to his Universal Republic imprint, 2101 Records. He introduced her to a new manager, Derrick "EI" Lawrence, who also managed Lil Wayne. Wayne invited her to join him on his I Am Music Tour after meeting her.

She changed her name to Porcelain Black, as it caused confusion to people who thought Porcelain and the Tramps was a band. Her stage name came from her childhood nickname, Porcelain, which was due to an extensive collection of porcelain dolls given to her by her aunt. Her aunt thought that the dolls resembled her in appearance, with strawberry blond hair and pale skin. She included "Black" in her name because she felt that it represented the opposite of "fragile" porcelain. She made plans to revisit the Porcelain and the Tramps project in the future.

The songs "King of the World" and "I'm Your Favorite Drug" were remastered for her debut album. Black co-wrote "Lolita" for Mexican pop singer Belinda. She made appearances in the music videos for Travie McCoy's "We'll Be Alright", Swizz Beatz's "Rock 'N' Roll" and Jeffree Star's "Get Away With Murder" in 2010. Black had a cameo role in Rock of Ages with RedOne's help, playing the lead singer of a 1980s glam metal band. She sang one of the sole original songs for the film, "Rock Angels". The song was written by Adam Anders and Desmond Child. Along with RedOne, Black composed "Save You Tonight", the closing song for One Direction's debut album, Up All Night.

Black appeared on Oxygen's Best Ink, where the working title of her debut album was said to be Mannequin Factory. Challengers on the show were tasked with creating cover art for the album in a style that Porcelain Black termed "stripper couture". The album has experienced numerous setbacks and rescheduled releases, and has not yet been released. Initially, RedOne was said to have produced and co-written all but one of the tracks with her. However, Black later recorded songs with other producers after the album's release date was pushed back. She made her television debut on the Late Show with David Letterman on July 21, 2011. After "This is What Rock and Roll Looks Like", "Naughty Naughty", the second single from her album, was released at the end of 2011. "This Is What Rock n' Roll Looks Like" was a modest hit on Billboard's Dance Club chart while the second single peaked at number 6 on the chart. Black featured in the song "DNA" for rapper Rye Rye's debut album, Go! Pop! Bang!. At some point succeeding the release of her singles, 2102 Records became an imprint of Capitol Records when Universal Republic went under, further delaying the release of any new material by the industrial singer.

During the summer of 2013, Porcelain Black performed a private gig in West Hollywood, featuring all-new material. Of the songs performed, "Rich Boi" and "Mama Forgive Me" received critical commentary. Several months later, 2101 Records released five songs in five weeks, following August 8, 2013. "Mama Forgive Me" was the first released. Her long-anticipated debut album was expected to be released after the five-week promotional period, with two brand new singles preceding it. After "Mama Forgive Me", Porcelain performed three new songs: "Pretty Little Psycho", "Rich Boi", and "One Woman Army". Popjustice hosted the songs "Rich Boi" and "One Woman Army" as their weekly Big Songs. Peaking at number 14 on the French Singles Chart, "One Woman Army" crowned the iTunes chart after she performed the song on the radio station NRJ and at the Fête de la Musique on the French channel France 2 on June 21, 2014, becoming her first number-one hit.

Later in 2013, Black announced through French radio station Skyrock that the album had no confirmed title, revealing she had considered the names Black Rainbow and Mannequin Factory, but that those titles might not make it to the album as she had recorded more songs.

In the 2010s, Porcelain Black's record label released an updated version of Deadmau5's "Arcadia" instrumental, featuring Black's vocals per request of Deadmau5's record label. Black was initially opposed to featuring her vocals on the song yet after pressure from her record label she finally agreed to the collaboration. The lyrical version was renamed "Sweeter". Idolator, a music-reporting website, called the track a "...sizzling electronic kiss-off with shady lyrics like "I bet the bitch you're with in the club is dancing to this right now!" Sounds like a surefire winner?" Deadmau5 rejected the collaboration as copyright infringement.

=== 2015–2019: Departure from 2101 Records and 313 ===
After many internal conflicts between Porcelain Black and her long-time collaborator, RedOne, the artist announced via social media that plans to release her long-anticipated album were cancelled. Plans to release a new album, in the vein of her previous project, Porcelain and the Tramps, was expected for late 2017. Music from her new project featured the same attitude of the singer's previous works with slower, mid-tempo songs and rapping and was released in July 2017.

=== 2020–2021: Independent full-length debut album ===
On February 5, 2020, through her Twitter account, Porcelain Black posted she was almost done with her first album, which needed mixing and mastering. After that post, she tweeted every song title, thus publishing the track listing of her upcoming record, yet to be titled. The project was expected to be released in 2020, and to include different genres, according to the singer.

On December 3, 2020, Black unexpectedly released self-produced demos of three new songs directly on her YouTube channel: "Thorns", "I Will Never Feel Like Home", and "C.U.N.T"; "Hurt" and "My Love's a Lie" were subsequently released on December 10. This release features elements of electronic music, among other genres, and includes singing, rapping, and screaming. In August 2021, Black stated via her Instagram that she was working with Rich Skillz on finishing up the production of "Thorns" and would soon release it.

== Personal life ==
In April 2012, she married model Bradley Soileau, who has appeared with singer Lana Del Rey in the music videos for "Blue Jeans", "Born to Die", and "West Coast". They divorced in 2014.

== Artistry ==
=== Musical style ===
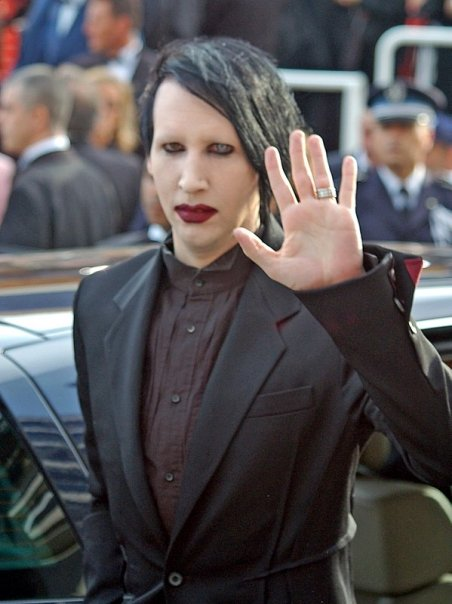
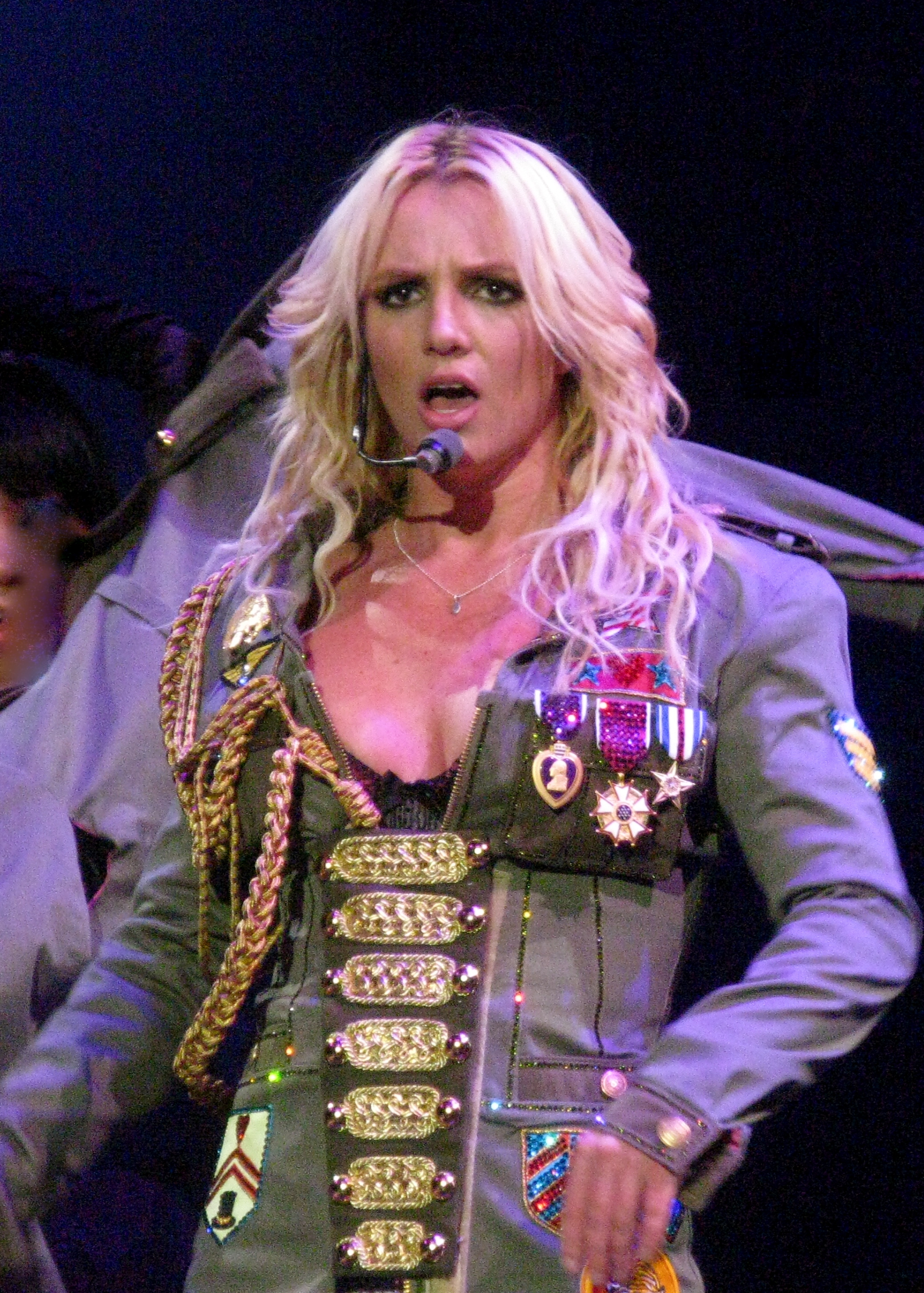
Black called her music the would-be offspring of Marilyn Manson (left) and Britney Spears (right).

Black's voice has been described as raspy, death growls often appearing in her music. In an interview with The Advocate, Black revealed that she has always had this talent and that it is something she has never practiced. RedOne, the producer who signed her to his label, says that Black's voice and attitude reminded him of Joan Jett. He concluded that "[s]he can scream and do things with her voice that nobody can do. She is uncompromising in pursuing her own creative vision. She's taking everything that's old and making it futuristic and bringing rock and roll back in her own way." Black styled her musical genre "horror-pop". It has been described as the love child between Marilyn Manson and Britney Spears, a fusion of dance-pop and darker industrial themes. Black cites that Spears inspires her deep love for choreography, while Manson inspires the sound and attitude of her lyrics and performance style.

Recalling the songwriting style she used when she had collaborated with RedOne, Porcelain Black said she would enter the studio with an idea she had come up with on her own at the piano and play it for RedOne. At other times, RedOne would play a beat he had constructed for her, and she would listen to it and see what vibes emerged from hearing it. Black usually creates a song title, then forges the song around that. She finds the most difficult songwriting process to be starting with melody, because making the syllables of her lyrics match the melody produces an effect that sounds forced and contrived. When working with RedOne, Porcelain Black said they would construct the melodies together, but all of the song lyrics were written exclusively by her; RedOne did not contribute to her music lyrically while they were working together on her first attempt at a debut album. Black writes all of her own songs. On the topic, she has said: "I write all my own stuff. I don't understand artists that don't write their own songs. I'm thankful for artists like Britney, but I don't understand how you can't write your own music. It's such a personal way of expressing yourself."

=== Public image ===
Critics have noted that her sound is more pop than rock, but Black is militant about her rock and roll image, saying "...I know I'm rock n roll." When asked about what it means to be rock and roll, she stated:

It's about being a badass and still being a good person. I feel like there is a lot of miscommunication when it comes to rock 'n roll. You don't have to have that "fuck you" attitude. It shouldn't be like that. Rock 'n roll is about embracing everybody and having fun. The more the merrier and the better the party is going to be! Rock 'n roll is about being casual and not giving a fuck. When you start giving a fuck and thinking you're too good for people – that's just wack.

Genre-wise, her sound has been described as "industrial pop", a fusion of pop and industrial metal. Her flashy and irreverent image has been compared to the work of many other artists. She is often compared to Lady Gaga, but she has also been compared to Joan Jett, Courtney Love, and Nicki Minaj. Black's two-tone hairstyle and fashion is inspired by both Manson and Spears as well, along with her desire to develop a persona in which a stable duality between "good" and "bad" exists. The former has gained her comparisons to the cartoon character Cruella de Vil. Black disavows the association as completely unfounded, specifically saying, "She's a [expletive] cartoon. Are you serious?" Black calls her fans "trainwrecks", alluding to the tattoo on the inside of her middle finger. Malcolm Harris, writing for The Huffington Post, discovered Porcelain Black on the cover of UnSound and reacted to her image:

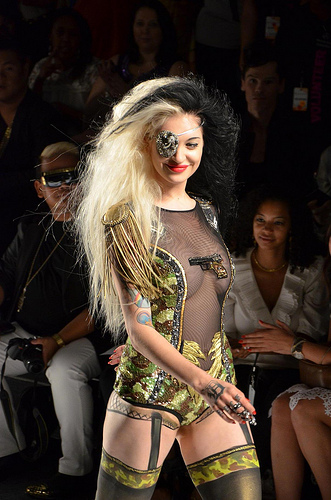
Porcelain Black on the runway at the 2012 Spring Falguni fashion show

I discovered two things about Porcelain Black well worth noting. The first was that Porcelain Black's personal style is similarly as outrageous as Lady Gaga or Niki Minaj [sic] – to the untrained eye that is. However, further research quickly reveals that there seems to be a naturalness and authenticity to her style, music and performance. Personally, I've always found there to be a slight disconnect from the way GaGa [sic] and young Ms. Minaj adorn themselves and the music they write, record and perform. But I think the number one thing that sets Porcelain Black's style apart from the other two pop-stars is there is something straight out of the gate that is aspirational about her style, especially to her growing fan base. I can already envision hordes of young girls (and my fellow gays) dying [sic] their hair to resemble Porcelain's as well as lining up to snap up H&M and Topshop inspired collections to get her vintage-goth-rock frocks and looks.

On the subject of her sexuality, Black said she was an "equal opportunist". Thematically, her music has been said to resonate with LGBT and adolescence, gaining her notoriety as a gay icon. On this subject, Black has said:

Since a lot of my music is about women's empowerment, I know a lot of strong women relate to it ... Me and all the gay boys that worked at my dad's hair salon got along quite nicely. I was exposed to all kinds of people and learned at a young age that people's differences are what make them beautiful. It's what makes the world go round. If we weren't different, the world would be boring.

Popjustice writer Peter Robinson said Porcelain Black was one of pop music's most confusingly styled artists, attributing the shift from her edgier, rock-inspired look to one resembling Jennifer Lopez as an attempt by her team to make her image more marketable. Despite the appraisal, he critiqued her song "Rich Boi" as being influenced by rock icons, Def Leppard and Steve Miller Band. In another review, Robinson commented on another record called "One Woman Army" from Porcelain Black's private Hollywood show. Stylistically in vein with Porcelain Black's pop rock genre hybrid, "One Woman Army" contains rapping, which Robinson said was "completely ridiculous and we love it." Blogging "What a chorus!", he called attention to the chorus, saying "...haven't we all at some point in our lives been on a battlefield like 'oh my God'?"

=== Influences ===
Black's biological father's love for rock music by Led Zeppelin, David Bowie, and Jimi Hendrix influences her. She has listed Nine Inch Nails and its frontman, Trent Reznor, Björk, Fiona Apple, Aaliyah, Skinny Puppy, AC/DC, Hole and Oasis as musical influences, citing the albums (What's the Story) Morning Glory? and Live Through This as the most influential to her current sound. She has also mentioned Janet Jackson as a primary influence, saying "I love everything she does." The first concert she attended was an AC/DC concert with her father. Recalling the experience, she told Revolver, "...I was like, when I grow up, this is what I want to do!"

== Discography ==
=== Albums ===
- Porcelain and the Tramps (2007)

=== EPs ===
- 313 (2017)

=== Singles as lead artist ===
Title	Year	Peak positions				Album
Title	Year	US Club	BEL (Wa)	FR	SPA (Airplay)	Album
"This Is What Rock n' Roll Looks Like" (feat. Lil Wayne)	2011	44	–	–	–	Non-album singles
"Naughty Naughty"	2011	6	–	–	–	Non-album singles
"One Woman Army"	2014	–	42	14	24	Non-album singles
"Fling"	2023	–	–	–	–	Non-album singles

=== Singles as featured artist ===
Title	Year	Album
"Action!" (Street Drum Corps featuring Porcelain Black) (Note: Porcelain Black is credited as Alaina Beaton.)	2007	We Are Machines

=== Guest appearances ===
Title	Year	Album	Artist
"Prisoner (Remix)"	2011	Shit You Weren't Supposed to Hear	Jeffree Star
"Jump Rope"	2012	¡Three Loco!	Three Loco
"DNA"	2012	Go! Pop! Bang!	Rye Rye
"Sunday Bloody Sunday"	2012	—N/a	7Lions
"Rock Angels" (Note: Although the song was featured in Rock of Ages, it was not included in the film's original soundtrack. The song was written by Adam Anders and Desmond Child.)	2012	—N/a	Various
"Told You So"	2013	Skitszo	Colette Carr
"Bullets"	2017	—N/a	ROKMAN, Detroit YB
"U Don't Know What You're Missing"	2017	Mechanical Royalty	Spookey Ruben
"Trick"	2020	America's Sweetheart	Chanel West Coast

List of songs written and composed by Porcelain Black
Title	Year	Album	Artist
"Lunacy Fringe"	2004	In Love and Death	The Used
"How Do You Love Someone?" (Note: Black re-recorded "How Do You Love Someone?" for her then-unreleased debut album Mannequin Factory.)	2009	Guilty Pleasure	Ashley Tisdale
"Lolita"	2010	Carpe Diem	Belinda
"Save You Tonight"	2011	Up All Night	One Direction
"Addicted to Love"	2011	Believe (II)	Orianthi
"Sawage Life"	2016	Smile	Mai Kuraki
"One Club at a Time" (Note: Other writers credited for the song in addition to Beaton include: Bilal Hajji, Achraf Jannusi, RedOne, Trevor Lyle Muzzy Geraldo Jacop Sandell, Johnny Severin, and Jimmy Paul Thornfeldt.)	N/A	One Club at a Time – EP	Midnight Red

=== Videography ===
List of music videos
Year	Title	Artist	Album	Director
2009	"Get Away With Murder"	Jeffree Star	Beauty Killer	SKINNY
2010	"We'll Be Alright"	Travie McCoy	Lazarus	Dugan O'Neal
2010	"Rock 'n' Roll"	Swizz Beatz featuring Lenny Kravitz, Lil Wayne and Travis Barker	Haute Living	TAJ
2011	"This Is What Rock n' Roll Looks Like"	Porcelain Black featuring Lil Wayne	N/A	Sanaa Hamri
2012	"Hell Yeah!"	Midnight Red	N/A	N/A
2012	"Freedom at 21"	Jack White	Blunderbuss	Hype Williams
2014	"Put Your Number in My Phone"	Ariel Pink	pom pom	Grant Singer
2015	"Paradise"	SB Stunts	Stuntman	N/A
2015	"Flight From Paris"	Bobby Newberry	N/A	Noel Maitland

== Filmography ==
Films
Year	Title	Role	Notes
2012	Rock of Ages		Cameo appearance; Contributed sole original song, "Rock Angel"

Television
Year	Title	Network	Notes
2012	Best Ink	Oxygen (NBCUniversal)	Tattoo artists compete to create cover art for "Mannequin Factory", with "stripper couture" themes.

== Tours ==
Opening act

- 2011: I Am Music Tour (Lil Wayne)
