= Telehit Awards =

Mexican music awards

- Country: Mexico
- Presented by: Telehit
- Reward: Telehit
- Website: Telehit Awards

Television/radio coverage
- Network: Telehit
- Runtime: Approx. 90–120 min. including commercials

Telehit Awards (Spanish: Premios Telehit) is a Mexican award that recognizes the greatest music events in Mexico, and broadcast by Telehit channel.

== 2008 ==
List of winners:

- Most Important Latin Artist in the World: Shakira
- Best Mexican Performer Rock-Pop: Alejandra Guzmán
- Contribution to the History of Rock: Enrique Bunbury
- Special Award Musical Genius: Nacho Cano
- Most successful Latin Artist Worldwide: Ricky Martin
- Special Lifetime Achievement Award Musical: La Maldita Vecindad
- More representative of the Rock Band closes: Jaguares
- Contribution to the History of Rock: Saúl Hernández
- Best Singer-Songwriter Pop Rock Music: Aleks Syntek
- Public Song: "Te quiero" – Flex
- Best Pop Artist of the Year: Enrique Iglesias

== 2009 ==
List of winners:

- Video of the Year: "La Perla" – Calle 13
- Best Alternative Band: Plastilina Mosh
- Best Young Band: División Minúscula
- Award for Song of the Year: "Poker Face" – Lady Gaga
- Award for Public Song 2009: "Pitbull"
- National Rock Album: Reptilectric – Zoé
- International Album of the Year: 95/08 Éxitos – Enrique Iglesias
- Artist of the Year: Café Tacuba
- Award Musical Genius: Gustavo Cerati
- Telehit Most Popular Artist: Wisin & Yandel
- Musical Career: Beto Cuevas
- Young Artist of the Year: Ha*Ash
- Special Award for his contribution to rock history: Santa Ana
- Most Important Latin American Artist: Alejandro Sanz
- Best Rock National: Jaguares
- Pop Artist of the Year: La Quinta Estación
- Artist Revelation: Juan Son
- Hot Artist: Fanny Lú
- Best International Youth Band: Tokio Hotel
- Most Important Latin Artist in the World: Shakira
- Mexican International Artist: Paulina Rubio
- Best Rock National: Moderatto

== 2010 ==
List of winners:

- Artist of the Year: Enrique Iglesias
- Video of the Year: "Telephone" – Lady Gaga featuring Beyoncé
- National Rock Band: Zoé
- Contribution History Rock n Roll: El Tri
- Young Artist of the Year: Belinda
- Most Popular Artist on Telehit: Pitbull
- Musical career: Miguel Bosé
- Artist Pop of the Year: Camila
- Song of the Year: "Mientes" – Camila
- Interpreter of the Year: Chayanne
- Most Important Latin Artist: Ricky Martin
- International Album of the Year: The Fame Monster – Lady Gaga
- Musical Quality Award: Natalia Lafourcade
- Song of the Public: "Colgando en tus manos" – Carlos Baute featuring Marta Sánchez
- Revelation Artist: Jotdog
- Alternative Band: DLD
- International Youth Artist: Jonas Brothers
- Rock Album in Spanish: Las consecuencias – Enrique Bunbury

== 2011 ==
List of winners:

- Most Popular Artist on Telehit: Camila
- Pop Artist of the Year: Enrique Iglesias
- Song of the Public: "Party Rock Anthem" – LMFAO
- Song of the Year: "Rabiosa" – Shakira
- Artist of the Year: Lady Gaga
- Video of the Year: "Born This Way" - Lady Gaga
- Contribution to the History of Electronic Music: David Guetta
- Revelation of the Year: Los Daniels
- Youth Artist of the Year: Ximena Sariñana
- International Youth Artist: Selena Gomez
- Best alternative band: Enjambre
- Best International Tour: Justin Bieber
- Best Rock Album of the Year: Foo Fighters
- Best Spanish-language singer-songwriter: Mario Domm
- Most Important Latin Artist in the World: Ricky Martin
- Best Telehit Comedy Program: Las Lavanderas

== 2012 ==
List of winners:

- Musical Genius: Caifanes
- Musical Career: El Tri
- Musical Quality: Calle 13
- Best Program Telehit: Platanito Show
- Best National Rock Band: Café Tacuba
- Best National Rock Album: Sueño de la máquina – Kinky
- Best National Pop Song: "Corre" – Jesse & Joy
- Best International Rock Album: "Living Things" – Linkin Park
- Song of the Year: "We Found Love" – Rihanna
- Best International Pop Group: One Direction
- Most Popular Artist in Telehit: One Direction
- Hispanic Video of the Year: "Ódiame" – Enrique Bunbury
- Video of the Year: "Boyfriend" – Justin Bieber
- Hispanic Pop Artist of the Year: Enrique Iglesias

== 2013 ==
List of winners:

- Female Pop Album: Red – Taylor Swift
- Best National Rock Album: Primario – DLD
- Best Rock Band: Muse
- Best National Rock Band: Molotov
- Best Male Pop Album: Unorthodox Jukebox – Bruno Mars
- Prize to "National Musical Quality": Café Tacuba
- Prize "International Musical Quality": Justin Timberlake
- Most Popular Artist in Telehit: Justin Bieber
- Best Telehit Comedy Program: Guerra de Chistes
- Best Spanish Video: "En la Obscuridad" – Belinda
- Boyband of the Year: One Direction
- Song of the Year: "Blurred Lines" – Robin Thicke featuring T.I. & Pharrell Williams
- National Pop Song: "En la Obscuridad" – Belinda
- Song of the Public: "Beauty and a Beat" – Justin Bieber
- Most Popular Video on Telehit: "Best Song Ever" – One Direction

== 2014 ==
List of winners:

- Most Popular Video on Telehit: "Don't Stop" – 5 Seconds of Summer
- Best National Rock Album: Molotov
- Recognition of the musical trajectory: Kiss
- Best Male Pop Record: x – Ed Sheeran
- Best Rock Band: Paramore
- Pop Rock Song of the Year: "Counting Stars" – OneRepublic
- Music Genius 2014: Mario Domm
- Song of the Year: "Happy" – Pharrell Williams
- Best Dj of the Year: Calvin Harris
- Best Video in Spanish: "I Love You... Te Quiero" – Belinda
- Best National Rock Band: Café Tacvba
- National Pop Song: Ángel cruel – CD9
- Video of the Year: "Dark Horse" – Katy Perry
- Boyband of the Year: One Direction

== 2015 ==
List of winners:

- Song of the Year: "Uptown Funk" – Mark Ronson featuring Bruno Mars
- Musical Quality: Clean Bandit
- Boyband of the Year: One Direction
- Most Popular Video of the Year: Drag Me Down – One Direction
- Best Female Solo Artist of the Year: Taylor Swift
- Video of the Year: "Bad Blood (Taylor Swift song)" – Taylor Swift
- Best Rock Band: Muse
- Pop/Rock Song of the Year: "What I Like About You" – 5 Seconds of Summer
- Pop Song in Spanish: "El Perdón" – Nicky Jam & Enrique Iglesias
- Best Male Solo Artist of the Year: Enrique Iglesias
- DJ of the Year: Robin Schulz
- Best National Rock Band: DLD
- Best Video in Spanish: "Ginza" – J Balvin
- Musical career: Panteón Rococó

== 2016 ==
List of winners:

- Best Male Solo Artist : Shawn Mendes
- DJ of the Year: Calvin Harris
- Best Rock Artist in Spanish: Mon Laferte
- Video in Spanish more request in social networks: "Sin tu amor" – Mario Bautista
- Best Pop Song in Spanish: "Duele el Corazón" – Enrique Iglesias featuring Wisin
- Best Female Solo Artist: Rihanna
- Urban Artist of the Year: Maluma
- Best New Artist: DNCE
- Telehit Prize to the Artistic Track: Molotov
- Best Video in English: "Girls Talk Boys" – 5 Seconds of Summer
- Artist of the Public: Fifth Harmony
- Urban Song of the Year: "Hasta el Amanecer" – Nicky Jam
- Video of the Year: "Up&Up" – Coldplay
- Song of the Year: "Sorry" – Justin Bieber
- Best Rock Band: Twenty One Pilots

== 2017 ==
List of winners:

- Best Male Solo Artist : Shawn Mendes
- DJ of the Year: Martin Garrix
- Best Pop/Rock Artist in Spanish: Mon Laferte
- Video in Spanish more request in social networks: "Hey DJ" – CNCO
- Best Female Solo Artist: Demi Lovato
- Best New Artist: Manuel Turizo
- Telehit Prize to the Artistic Track: Maluma
- Best Video in English: "Slow Hands" – Niall Horan
- Artist of the Public: CD9
- Urban Artist of the Year: J Balvin
- Video of the Year: "Shape of You" – Ed Sheeran
- Song of the Year: "Despacito" – Luis Fonsi & Daddy Yankee
- Artist of the Decade: Enrique Iglesias

== Most wins ==
Artist	Awards Won
Enrique Iglesias	9
One Direction	7
Justin Bieber	5
Belinda	4
Taylor Swift	4
Mon Laferte	4
Shakira	3
Lady Gaga	3
5 Seconds of Summer	3
Ricky Martin	3
Camila	3
