= One Woman Army (Porcelain Black song) =

Single by Porcelain Black
- Released: March 5, 2014
- Recorded: 2013
- Genre: Pop
- Length: 3:36
- Label: RedOne Records
- Songwriters: Alaina Beaton; Nadir Khayat; Bilal Hajji; Achraf Jannusi; Giorgio Tuinfort
- Producer: RedOne

Porcelain Black singles chronology
"Naughty Naughty" (2011)	"One Woman Army" (2014)	"Fling" (2023)

Music video
- "One Woman Army" on YouTube

"One Woman Army" is a song by American singer Porcelain Black. The song was set to appear on her debut album Mannequin Factory, though the album has since been cancelled. It was produced by the artist's long-time collaborator RedOne. "One Woman Army" was released as a single on the iTunes Store on March 5, 2014, in France. An EP containing three remixes of "One Woman Army" was released on through iTunes on April 8, 2014.

"One Woman Army" peaked at 14 on the French Singles Chart, and topped the country's iTunes chart. The song also reached the top 40 in Belgium and Spain. Critics praised the song. The song was featured as Popjustice's "Big Song" and "Song of the Week". After the song's success in France, Porcelain Black performed it on the popular radio station NRJ as well as the Fête de la Musique on the French channel France 2 in June 2014.

== Background and release ==
"One Woman Army" was released on her official YouTube channel on March 5, 2014. An EP containing three remixes of "One Woman Army" was released through iTunes on April 8, 2014. During the summer of 2013, Porcelain Black performed a private gig in West Hollywood, featuring all new material. Of the songs performed, "Rich Boi" and "Mama Forgive Me" received critical commentary. Several months later, 2101 Records released five songs in five weeks, following 8 August 2013. "Mama Forgive Me" was the first released. Her long anticipated debut album is expected to be released after the five-week promotional period, with two brand new singles preceding it. After "Mama Forgive Me", Porcelain performed three new songs, whose titles were: "How Do You Love Someone", "Pretty Little Psycho", "Rich Boi", and "One Woman Army" respectively. Popjustice hosted the songs "Rich Boi" and "One Woman Army" as their weekly Big Songs.

== Composition ==
In the chorus of "One Woman Army", Porcelain Black sings: "I'm on the battlefield like oh my god / knocking soldiers down like house of cards", followed by an "oh la la" ear worm. Typical for mainstream music released in the past decade, the song follows a verse-chorus formula.

== Critical reception ==
Overall, "One Woman Army" received positive reviews from music journalists. Calling the chorus "powerful", French critics compared the song to works produced by Nicki Minaj, Lady Gaga, and Natalia Kills. In another review, Popjustice writer Peter Robinson commented on Porcelain Black's performance of "One Woman Army" at a private Hollywood show. Robinson called the song "completely ridiculous and we love it." Blogging "What a chorus!", he called attention to the refrain, saying "...haven't we all at some point in our lives been on a battlefield like 'oh my God'?" Pure People called the song "thunderous" and "radio-friendly". Music-reporting website Idolator called the song "surprisingly great".

== Chart performance ==
Porcelain Black, in June 2014, made sales in France, reaching number 3 on the iTunes chart, before crowning the chart at number 1,. On the French Singles Chart, "One Woman Army" peaked at number 14, peaking at number 42 on the Belgian singles chart, Ultratop. In Spain, the song reached 24 on the airplay charts.

== Music video ==
Following the song's release, Black released a lyric video on March 12, 2014. Two music videos were filmed for the song, the first one being directed by Roberto de Angelis and shot in Almería and the second one being directed by Hype Williams, but neither of them were released.

== Live performances ==
"One Woman Army" was performed at French radio station NRJ on 4 June 2014. She also performed the song on the Fête de la Musique on the French channel France 2 on 21 June 2014. Sporting an all-black costume and flanked by backup dancers, the performance was said by Pure People to "impress".

== Track listings ==
- Original release:
1. "One Woman Army" - 3:36
- One Woman Army Remixes EP:
1. "One Woman Army" (Alvita Remix) - 5:06
2. "One Woman Army" (Deparis Remix) - 4:12
3. "One Woman Army" (Rush Remix) - 4:19

== Charts ==
Chart (2014)	Peak position
France (SNEP)	14
Belgium (Ultratop 50 Wallonia)	42
Spain (Airplay Chart) (PROMUSICAE)	24

== Release date ==
Country	Date	Format	Label	Ref
France	March 5, 2014	Digital download	2101 Records, Universal Republic Records	
United States	March 5, 2014	Digital download	2101 Records, Universal Republic Records	
