= En la Obscuridad =

Single by Belinda

from the album Catarsis
- Released: November 12, 2012 (Airplay); January 8, 2013 (Digital)
- Recorded: 2012
- Genre: Electropop; dance-pop
- Length: 3:30
- Label: Capitol Latin
- Songwriters: Belinda, Nacho Peregrín, Joan M. Ortíz Espada, Víctor "El Nasi" Martínez
- Producer: Víctor "El Nasi"

Belinda singles chronology
"Te Voy A Esperar" (2012)	"En la Obscuridad" (2012)	"Constantemente Mía" (2013)

Music video
- "En la Obscuridad" on YouTube

Audio
- "En la Obscuridad" on YouTube

"En la Obscuridad" (English: "In the Darkness") is the second single from the Spanish born-Mexican singer Belinda's fourth studio album Catarsis; it was released on iTunes in Mexico on January 8, 2013 by Capitol Latin.

== Background and composition ==
Due to the success of the single "Egoísta" featuring Pitbull from Belinda's third studio album,Carpe Diem, Belinda announced in an interview for a Mexican local radio station, that she would be collaborating with Pitbull again for the second single from her album Catarsis, on a song entitled "I Love You, Te Quiero". However, for unknown reasons, the single release was cancelled, and her record label opted to release "En La Oscuridad" instead, which was released to Latin radio stations on November 12, 2012. I Love You... Te Quiero was later released as the album's fourth and final single from the album.

The single was released on iTunes on January 8, 2013.

== Music video ==
The video was shot on the 18th and 20 December 2012 and was directed by Daniel Shain. It is inspired by the movie, Inception, directed by Christopher Nolan. According to magazine TVNotas, the music video was shot in various locations around the Historic center of Mexico City, as well as at Churubusco Studios in Mexico City. This is the most expensive music video in Belinda's career to date, at a cost of US$2 million.

The scenery is an 8 tons revolving structure; also there was used a hot air balloon which flew over the streets of the first shots of the city. The scenery was created by Belinda's father, Ignacio Peregrín, and it took two days of construction. For the wardrobe, Belinda was inspired by several important figures in the Mexican culture like the Virgin of Guadalupe and Frida Kahlo, but with a sophisticated touch. Gustavo Matta participated in the creation of the look called "Mexican chic", which was originally Belinda's mother, Belinda Schüll's idea. Her romantic interest is the Brazilian model Pedro Arnon.

On February 21, her official video for "En La Obscuridad" was released and featured on the Billboard site's homepage, which boosted the video past 8 million total views in just one week. With just 2 days, the video broke the Latin record on VEVO, with more than 3 million views. The exposure caused a 153% growth in weekly fan acquisition with the addition of 5,000 new Facebook fans (up 17%) and 211,000 new Twitter followers. The video's popularity contributed to over 12 million plays to her channel for the week of the release (up 32%) and the overall exposure contributed to 16% rise in weekly visits to her Wikipedia page. Belinda debuted at 45 on the Social 50 chart. The music video has over 226 million views on VEVO, but the video has been removed because it violated YouTube's Terms of Service although the video is still available on VEVO only in the USA, Canada, Mexico, Brazil, Spain and the Netherlands.

== Promotion ==
She performed "En La Obscuridad" at the Premios Telehit 2012, Tour Positivo and Mexico Sueña. She has made many interviews around Europe, Latin America and United States to promote the single, she also has been on a promo tour across United States, Spain and Mexico.

== Track listing ==
Digital download

1. "En La Obscuridad" (Belinda, Nacho Peregrín, Joan M. Ortíz Espada, Víctor "El Nasi" Martínez) — 3:30

== Charts ==
Chart (2013)	Peak position
Mexico (Billboard Mexican Airplay)	32
Mexico (Billboard Mexican Espanol Airplay)	9
Mexico (Monitor Latino)	10
Mexico Spanish-AC-Pop (Monitor Latino)	2
US Hot Latin Songs (Billboard)	33
US Latin Streaming Songs (Billboard)	9

=== Year-end charts ===
Year-end chart performance for "En La Oscuridad"
Chart (2013)	Position
Mexico (Monitor Latino)	69
