= Thomas Zander =

Thomas Zander may refer to:

- Thomas Zander (wrestler), German Greco-Roman wrestler
- Thomas Zander (footballer), German football goalkeeper

== See also ==
- Thomas Zander Bleck, American recording artist
