= Bed & Breakfast (disambiguation) =

Bed and breakfast is a type of guest accommodation.

Bed & Breakfast may also refer to:

- Bed & Breakfast (band), a German boy band
- "Bed & Breakfast" (Bob's Burgers), an episode of the television series Bob's Burgers
- Bed and Breakfast (album), two albums released by Spookey Ruben
- Bed and breakfasting, or wash sale, a share dealing technique used to establish a loss for tax purposes
- Airbnb, originally named AirBed & Breakfast, a tourism lodging company whose original name referenced the company’s services

== Films ==
- Bed and Breakfast (1930 film), directed by Walter Forde, starring Jane Baxter and Richard Cooper
- Bed and Breakfast (1938 film), directed by Walter West
- Bed & Breakfast (1992 film), directed by Robert Ellis Miller, starring Roger Moore, Talia Shire, Colleen Dewhurst, and Nina Siemaszko
- Bed & Breakfast (2010 film), directed by Márcio Garcia and written by Leland Douglas
