= Into the Morning (song) =

2005 song performed by The Weekend

Single by The Weekend

from the album Beatbox My Heart
- Released: 2005
- Recorded: 2005
- Genre: Pop rock, Pop punk
- Length: 3:59
- Label: Lakeshore Records; Teenage USA Recordings
- Songwriters: Andrea Wasse, Ryan Ford, Jason Westman, Lincoln Cushman

Music video
- "Into the Morning" on YouTube

"Into the Morning" is a single by the Canadian band The Weekend, from their 2005 album Beatbox My Heart, which was released on February 8, 2005 by Teenage USA Recordings.

== Information ==
The song was written by Andrea Wasse, Ryan Ford, Jason Westman, Lincoln Cushman and released in 2005.

The song also appears on the film's soundtrack D.E.B.S., it was released on iTunes on March 22, 2005 by Lakeshore Records.

The song has been covered by Spanish-born Mexican singer Belinda ("Culpable"), for her third studio album Carpe Diem.

== Culpable ==
"Culpable"

Promotional single by Belinda

from the album Carpe Diem
- Released: March 9, 2010
- Recorded: 2009
- Genre: Latin pop
- Length: 3:55
- Label: Capitol Latin
- Songwriters: Andrea Wasse, Lincoln Cushman, Ryan Ford, Jay Westman, Belinda, Nacho Peregrín
- Producer: Carlos Jean

Audio
- "Culpable" on YouTube

"Culpable" is a song by Mexican singer Belinda, released as the second promotional single from her third studio album Carpe Diem.

=== Information ===
The song was the second promotional single, released on March 9, 2010. The song is a Spanish version of "Into the Morning" by the Canadian band The Weekend. The Spanish version was adapted by Belinda and her father Nacho Peregín and produced by the Spanish DJ and record producer Carlos Jean. At first it was mentioned that this song would be the first single from the album, but was confirmed by Belinda via Twitter that the first single would be "Egoísta".

The song debuted at number 8 on the iTunes Overall and at number 4 on the iTunes Latin Music.

=== Video ===
Belinda had confirmed via Twitter that "Culpable" would be the third single from her album, and that the video would record in Buenos Aires, Argentina, but was canceled at the end of the promotion of Carpe Diem.

=== Release ===
The song was released as a digital download via the iTunes Store on March 9, 2010.

==== Track list ====
iTunes Digital download

1. "Culpable" (Andrea Wasse, Lincoln Cushman, Ryan Ford, Jay Westman, Belinda, Nacho Peregrin) – 3:55
