= En El Amor Hay Que Perdonar =

Single by Belinda

from the album Catarsis
- Released: June 19, 2012
- Recorded: 2011
- Genre: Dance
- Length: 4:01
- Label: Capitol Latin
- Songwriters: Belinda, Víctor "El Nasi" Martínez, José Ignacio Peregrín Gutiérrez, Joan M. Ortíz Espada
- Producer: Víctor "El Nasi"

Belinda singles chronology
"Dopamina" (2010)	"En El Amor Hay Que Perdonar" (2012)	"Te Voy A Esperar" (2012)

Music video
- "En El Amor Hay Que Perdonar" on YouTube

Audio
- "En El Amor Hay Que Perdonar" on YouTube

Alternative cover
- "En El Amor Hay Que Perdonar (Ballad)" Digital Download

Audio
- "En El Amor Hay Que Perdonar (Balada)" on YouTube

"En El Amor Hay Que Perdonar" (English: "In Love One Must Forgive"), is a song by Spanish-born Mexican actress and singer-songwriter Belinda released as the lead single from her fourth studio album Catarsis.

== Background and composition ==
After almost two years of absence from the music scene, Belinda started promoting her fourth studio album. On June 4, 2012, Belinda released a teaser on her YouTube account. Through her account Twitter, and publicizing the launch using the hashtag #BelindaJunio19. The song was officially released for sale on June 19 by Capitol Latin. A ballad version was released on July 20.

The song was written by Belinda Peregrin, José Ignacio Gutierrez, Joan Ortiz and Victor "El Nasi", who was also the producer of it, and has produced for the reggaeton group Wisin & Yandel, and contains a mixture of pop urban rhythm, creating a style of dance.

While the cover of the single shows a picture of the singer in which is shown naked and with her hands in prayer, which was created by the artist Gildo Medina based blue ink for two days, representing dream images, epic moments in a natural atmosphere and surreal, whose realization process was shown in a second teaser released on YouTube on June 12. This image generated controversy among Mexican show business, to which the singer said on Twitter in relation to the image: "Art is the expression of the soul that wants to be heard. When we apologize stripped the soul ..."

=== Lyrical content ===
The content of the lyrics is inspired by stories that are close to the heart of the interpreter. Belinda commented on the significance of the topic: "When one asks for forgiveness with the naked soul and the eye upward, reflecting humility."

== Music video ==
A video with the lyrics of the song was released on June 17 on her YouTube account. Both the screenplay and the direction of the music video were made by director, producer and screenwriter Daniel Shain along with Belinda, who previously had worked for Egoísta script, while the choreography was done by the Australian Jasmine Meakin. The video recording was made the first days of July on the beaches of Acapulco, Barra Vieja and Playa Ventura.

After promoting through Twitter the release of the music video, premiered on August 2 on the program Primer Impacto Univision, and hours later was released on YouTube on your account with a four and a half minutes also was released on their VEVO channel on 17 August and put on sale by iTunes. Displays striking natural landscapes where it appears as the queen of the jungle with different costumes with different dancers performing choreography also Belinda exotic animals is accompanied by a jaguar and an eagle.

== Promotion and release ==
On June 11, a week before the official launch, launched a 12-second teaser on radio stations in Puerto Rico and the United States, with a one-week campaign through WKAQ stations KSSE Puerto Rico and the United States. On July 18 it was sent the simple physical and digital radio stations pop, urban and topical Monitor Mediabase and Latino. She performed "En El Amor Hay Que Perdonar" on Premios Juventud 2012, Kids Choice Awards Mexico 2012, Despierta América, Hoy, and The Voice Mexico.

== Live performances ==
On September 2, Belinda made her first appearance in the delivery of the Kids Choice Awards Mexico 2012 at the Pepsi Center where she sang the song live.

== Formats ==
- "En El Amor Hay Que Perdonar" — 4:01
- "En El Amor Hay Que Perdonar" (Ballad) — 4:03
- "En El Amor Hay Que Perdonar" (U.S. CD Single) — 4:04

== Charts ==
Positions obtained by "En El Amor Hay Que Perdonar"
Country	Chart	List	Peak position
2012
Venezuela	Record Report	Venezuelan Singles Chart	3
Denmark	IFPI	Danish Singles Chart	1
US	Billboard	Latin Pop Songs	18
US	Billboard	Top Latin Songs	39
Mexico	Billboard	Mexican Singles Chart	1
Argentina	Billboard	Argentinean Singles Chart	1
Japan	Billboard	Japan Hot 100	90
Colombia	National-Report	Colombian Singles Chart	5
