= This Is What Rock n' Roll Looks Like =

Single by Porcelain Black featuring Lil Wayne
- Released: March 29, 2011
- Recorded: 2010
- Genre: Dance pop; pop rock
- Length: 4:12
- Label: Universal Republic; 2101
- Songwriters: Alaina Beaton; Nadir "RedOne" Khayat; Dwayne Carter; Bilal Hajji
- Producer: RedOne

Porcelain Black singles chronology
"This Is What Rock n' Roll Looks Like" (2011)	"Naughty Naughty" (2011)

Lil Wayne singles chronology
"John" (2011)	"This Is What Rock n' Roll Looks Like" (2011)	"Someone to Love Me (Naked)" (2011)

Music video
- "This Is What Rock n' Roll Looks Like" on YouTube

"This Is What Rock n' Roll Looks Like" is the debut single of American industrial singer-songwriter Porcelain Black, featuring American rapper Lil Wayne. This song was to serve as the lead single from the singer's debut studio album, Mannequin Factory, which has now been cancelled. Produced by Moroccan-Swedish producer RedOne, who had originally discovered Black, "This Is What Rock n' Roll Looks Like" is influenced by the genre of rock, lyrically stating how the listener should be proud of who they are. The song was released digitally in the United States on March 29, 2011, and managed to chart at number forty-four on the US Billboard Hot Dance Club Songs.

A music video for "This Is What Rock n' Roll Looks Like", shot and directed by Sanaa Hamri, was released on March 27, 2011. The music video pays homage to Porcelain Black's high school experiences, where she was constantly teased by "snobby rich kids", but never gave in to the pressure of her peers around her. The video serves as a form of revenge for Porcelain Black against high school tormentors. "This Is What Rock n' Roll Looks Like" garnered mixed reviews from critics, most of whom were shocked by Porcelain Black's image and sounds but favored her apparent perception of herself as the "offspring" of fellow musicians Britney Spears and Marilyn Manson and their individual styles. Porcelain Black performed the song on the Late Show with David Letterman, marking her debut televised appearance.

The song was featured in the Beavis and Butt-Head episode "Time Machine" and in the 2013 film The Smurfs 2.

== Background and release ==
"This Is What Rock n' Roll Looks Like" was written by Porcelain Black, Lil Wayne, RedOne, Bilal Hajji, with RedOne providing the song's production. In the song's writing credits, Porcelain Black and Lil Wayne are credited under their real names, Alaina Beaton and Dwayne Carter Jr. respectively. After being introduced to Lil Wayne's manager, Derrick "EI" Lawrence, by producer RedOne, Porcelain Black stated that she met Lil Wayne in New York City when he heard "This Is What Rock n' Roll Looks Like", where he expressed an interest in adding his vocals to the song. The single cover for "This Is What Rock n' Roll Looks Like" was revealed on March 21, 2011, alongside a snippet of the song.

"This Is What Rock n' Roll Looks Like" was released digitally through the United States iTunes Store on March 29, 2011. Following the release of Porcelain Black's second single, "Naughty Naughty," Dutch DJ, remixer and house music producer R3hab produced a remix of "This Is What Rock n' Roll Looks Like," making it available for free download through SoundCloud on January 24, 2012. R3hab went on to compliment Porcelain Black's original song, stating, "The original vibe is crazy, and I am a big fan of Lil Wayne. This track makes you wanna rage like the lyrics say! I see [the remix] as a rollercoaster ride. Breaks slow it down. Then there is a climb, and the big drop!" Porcelain Black complimented R3hab's remix in an interview with MTV News: "I wish[ed] his remixes were the official singles because they really pop off next level. I love all the spooky horror pop synths he throws in the mixes, and the breakdowns make me wanna throw back shots of whiskey and hair whip. If I could have sex with a song I'd def be tappin' dat remix!"

== Music and lyrics ==
"This Is What Rock n' Roll Looks Like"
Black's debut single, "This is What Rock N' Roll Looks Like" showcases her raspy vocals and rock influence.

Described as "in-your-face", "This Is What Rock n' Roll Looks Like" is influenced by the genres of rock, dance-pop, and power pop, while containing "roaring" guitars and lyrics which aim to remind listeners to be proud of who they are. Vocally, Porcelain Black sings as if straining through "a maze of razorblades," according to Steven J. Horowitz of YRB Magazine. The RedOne-produced track employs a beat that is reminiscent of his work with Lady Gaga. Porcelain Black screams in the chorus "Hey hey hey if you're ready to rage / Raise your hands up, this what rock and roll looks like / Yeah yeah yeah, wearing leather and lace / Raise your hands up, this what rock and roll looks like." While being interviewed by the Los Angeles Times, Porcelain Black discussed in depth about the genre mix in "This Is What Rock n' Roll Looks Like":

I'm a pretty good representation of rock and roll, as far as I'm concerned. I'm ... crazy. Some people might have their own opinions and say well this is kind of pop-y. I think we're in a world now where music is evolving and it doesn't have to be just one thing. It doesn't have to be just pop or just rock. You can mix it and have it still be legitimate rock 'n' roll. I like to say if Marilyn Manson and Britney Spears ... had a kid it would be me.

Although the song's title references the physical appearance of what rock and roll looks like, Porcelain Black revealed in an interview with AOL's NoiceCreep that rock and roll is not dependent on the physical appearance of someone. She stated:

Whatever you want it to look like. There are so many types of rock 'n' roll, you can't say one thing, this is what rock 'n' roll looks like. Rock 'n' roll I think is about attitude and the way you carry yourself, and that's what it looks like. It's not necessarily what you're wearing.

== Critical reception ==
"This Is What Rock n' Roll Looks Like" received generally mixed reviews by critics, most of whom were surprised with Porcelain Black's outgoing persona and the pop production by RedOne. Gerrick D. Kennedy of the Los Angeles Times complimented the song's production by stating that it could have been used by Lady Gaga. Ian Drew of Us Weekly called the single "shocking" and "electric". Allison Stewart of The Washington Post gave "This Is What Rock 'n' Roll Looks Like" a mixed review, describing Porcelain Black as a "girl-fronted version of Mötley Crüe circa Dr. Feelgood". Jon Wiederhorn of Inked dubbed the song "a [sic] euphoric digital feast of raspy melodic vocals, four-to-the-floor beats, and keyboards that buzz like electric guitars."

== Chart performance ==
"This Is What Rock n' Roll Looks Like" debuted on the U.S. Billboard Hot Dance Club Songs at number forty-six, on the week ending July 18, 2011. The following week, the song went up two spots, peaking at number forty-four. The following two weeks, "This Is What Rock n' Roll Looks Like" remained stationary at number forty-four on the weeks ending August 1, 2011 and August 8, 2011, respectively.

== Music video ==
Porcelain Black and Lil Wayne depicted as children in the music video.

A music video for "This Is What Rock n' Roll Looks Like" was shot and directed by Sanaa Hamri at Citrus College in Glendora, California. Porcelain Black discussed the idea behind the music video for "This Is What Rock n' Roll Looks Like" with AOL's Carlos Ramirez, stating it was based on real life experiences. After Porcelain Black's mother had re-married, she was forced to move to Rochester, Michigan, which Porcelain Black described as "a really rich area". Attending high school, Porcelain Black was surrounded by "snotty rich kids" who would tease her saying "You're a fucking freak, what's your problem?", to which Porcelain Black would reply "You're boring and fake, get away from me." Reviewing her past, Porcelain Black realized it would make for a good music video. A behind the scenes look at shooting the music video was released on May 12, 2011.

In an interview with AOL Music's Contessa Gayles, Porcelain Black discussed the concept of the video as revenge. She stated:

It was about getting revenge. People were always hating on me, because I was different. I was like, "I'm going to sing, I'm going to do this, I'm going to do that," they were like "OK, sure you are." And I was like "No, I'm serious. This is what I'm going to do." And everybody was like, "Yeah right." Even when I told everyone I was moving to LA to do music and had a going away party, only one person showed up, because no one believed that I was really going away. They were like, "You'll be back." So it was kind of just like my revenge, and just a statement, like throwing it back in their face.

The music video debuted on March 27, 2011. The music video begins with a young Porcelain Black being teased by a group of blonde girls, who resemble "The Plastics" in Mean Girls (2004). As Porcelain Black is being teased, a young version of Lil Wayne comes to the defense of Porcelain Black, scaring away the group of blonde girls. The video then fast forwards nine years where Black, accompanied by her own entourage, walks past a group of snobby girls, giving them the middle-finger as she walks away leaving them in shock. As the video continues, Black gets revenge on her high school enemies by tearing up the school's library and cafeteria. During Lil Wayne's verse, the two are seen raging in the school's gym. Rapper Birdman makes a cameo appearance in this scene.

== Performances and usage in media ==
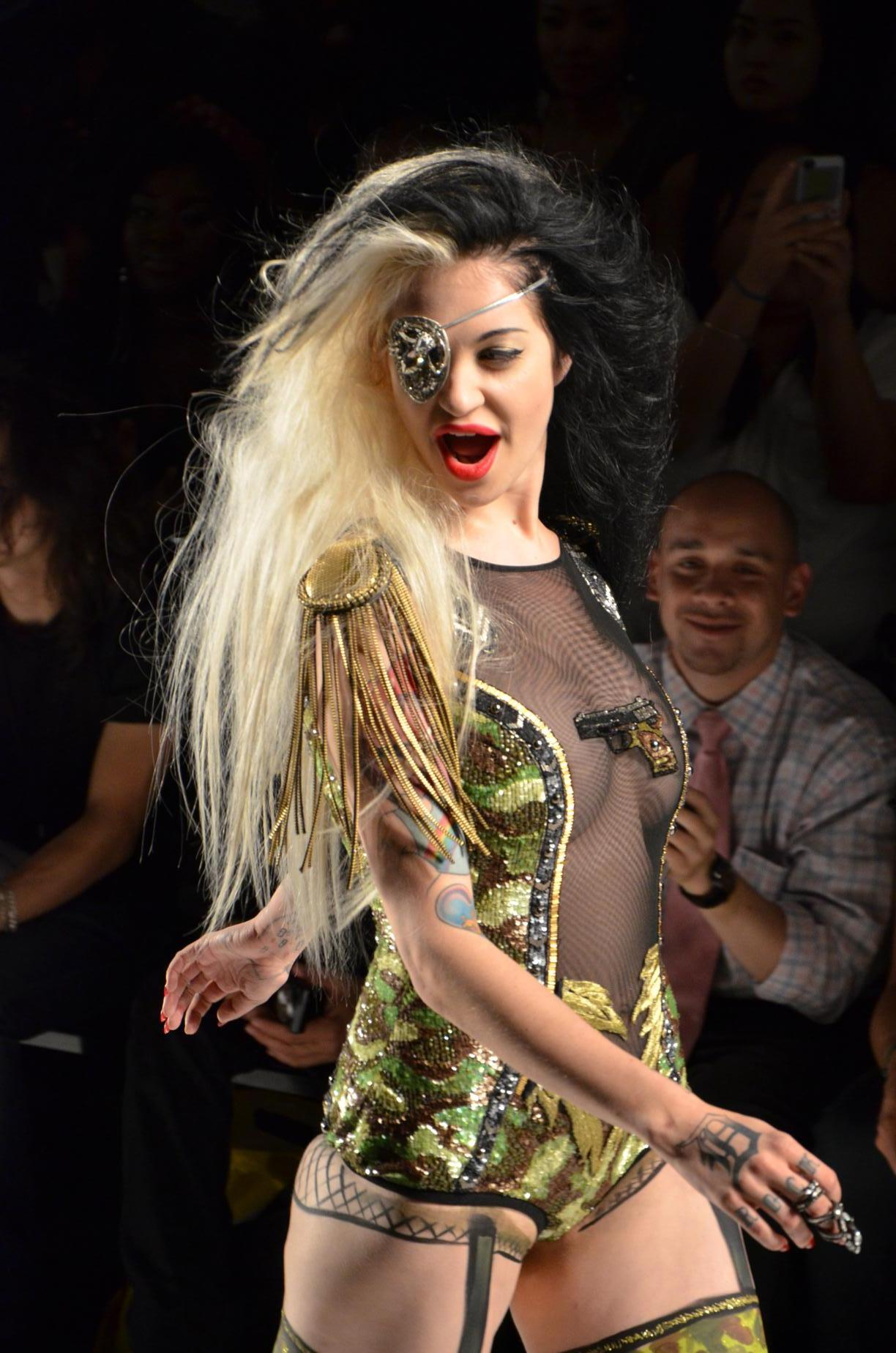
Porcelain Black appeared at the 2012 Fashion Week to promote "This Is What Rock n' Roll Looks Like."

Porcelain Black performed the song as the opening act for Lil Wayne on the I Am Music II tour. Porcelain Black made her first ever television appearance on the Late Show with David Letterman on Thursday, July 21, 2011. Porcelain Black wore a leather, leotard-like bustiere number, complete with mesh, fringe and metallic studs as she whipped her black-and-blonde hair around, while prancing across the stage with her gothic dancers. While making her debut televised performance, Lil Wayne did not appear alongside Porcelain Black. In an interview with AOL's NoiseCreep, Porcelain Black described her first televised appearance as "intense, amazing, surreal", revealing that prior to the performance she was very nervous stating "Oh my god! I'm about to give birth to a panic attack!" Becky Bain of Idolator compared Black's styling to that of Lady Gaga's. Contessa Gayles of AOL described Porcelain Black's choreography as "racy," later complimenting Porcelain Black on her "two-toned, Cruella De Vil-inspired coiffure." Porcelain Black walked down the runway in a camouflage corset designed by Falguni and Shane Peacock at the 2012 Spring Fashion Week, as her song played in the background. Her appearance there was used to promote the single.

"This Is What Rock n' Roll Looks Like" appeared in the tenth episode of the eighth season of Beavis and Butthead. Expecting the duo to comment on the disparity between the song's title and its genre, R.L. Shaffer of IGN noticed that no such comparison was made; instead, the classroom setting was criticized while the presence of Lil Wayne was appreciated. The song was also used in the 2013 film, The Smurfs 2.

== Track listing ==
- Digital release:
1. "This Is What Rock n' Roll Looks Like" (featuring Lil Wayne) – 4:12

== Charts ==
Chart (2011)	Peak position
Romania (Romanian Top 100)	97
US Dance Club Songs (Billboard)	44

== Release history ==
Release dates and formats for "This Is What Rock n' Roll Looks Like"
Region	Date	Format	Label(s)	Ref.
United States	June 21, 2011	Mainstream airplay	Universal Republic	
