= Constantemente Mía =

Single by Il Volo featuring Belinda

from the album Más Que Amor
- Released: February 20, 2013 (Airplay); February 26, 2013 (Digitally)
- Recorded: 2012
- Genre: Pop
- Length: 4:04
- Label: Universal Music Latin; Interscope Records
- Songwriters: Diane Warren, Edgar Cortázar, Mark Portmann
- Producers: Humberto Gatica, Tony Renis

Il Volo singles chronology
"Hasta El Final" (2011)	"Constantemente Mía" (2013)	"El Triste" (2013)

Belinda singles chronology
"En la Obscuridad" (2012)	"Constantemente Mía" (2013)	"Nada" (2013)

Music video
- "Constantemente Mía" on YouTube

"Constantemente Mía" (English: "Constantly Mine") is the first single by the Italian trio Il Volo, with the Mexican singer Belinda, from their studio album Más Que Amor.

== Information ==
"Constantemente Mía" is a Spanish adaptation of the song "I Bring You To My Senses", which was on Il Volo's album We Are Love. The adaptation of this version was made by the compositor Edgar Cortázar, with Diane Warren and Mark Portmann. The trio's album contains two versions of the song, one with Belinda vocals and the other without it.

The song features with the participation of the Mexican singer Belinda. The song was announced for the first time on February 14, 2013, through the social networks of the artists, who want to surprise their fans with a taste of the song.

== Live performance ==
The Italian trio and Belinda performed the song at the Premios Oye! 2013 on May 13, 2013.

== Video ==
The music video was filmed in live and the premiere was on May 2, 2013, on Ritmoson Latino and Telehit.

== Track listing ==
Digital download
No.	Title	Length
1.	"Constantemente Mía" (featuring Belinda)	4:04

== Charts ==
Chart (2013)	Peak position
Mexico Top 20 Inglés (Monitor Latino)	20

== Release dates ==
Region	Date	Format	Label	Ref.
Worldwide	February 20, 2013	Radio premiere	UMLE	
Worldwide	February 26, 2013	Digital download	UMLE/Interscope	
