= Wendy McDonald – Live in Japan =

Wendy McDonald

EP by Spookey Ruben
- Released: 1996
- Recorded: 1995, July 1996
- Label: TVT Records
- Producer: Brad Nelson

Spookey Ruben chronology
Modes of Transportation Vol. 1 (1995)	Wendy McDonald (1996)	Modes of Transportation Vol. 2 (1998)

Wendy McDonald (Live in Japan) is a single/live EP by Spookey Ruben, released in 1996. The live tracks were recorded in July 1996 at Club Quattro, in Japan, and includes a cover of Golden Brown by The Stranglers. The album also includes a remix of Wendy McDonald by DJ Spooky.

== Reviews ==
Professional ratings
Review scores
Source	Rating
Allmusic	3/5 stars

In Allmusic, reviewer Stephen Thomas Erlewine calls the album, "an entertaining run through his back catalog, highlighted by a cover of the Stranglers' "Golden Brown."

== Track listing ==
1. "Wendy McDonald"
2. "It's Not What you Do It's You" (live)
3. "Crystal Cradle" (live)
4. "These Days are Old" (live)
5. "Golden Brown" (live)
6. "Wendy McDonald" (live)
7. "Wendy McDonald" (DJ Spooky Drift Remix)

== Production ==
- Art director: Spookey Ruben
- Engineer: Chris Flam
- Mastered: Kevin Hodge
