= Nada (Belinda Peregrín song) =

Single by Belinda

from the album Catarsis
- Released: July 5, 2013 (Airplay)
- Recorded: 2012
- Genre: Pop
- Length: 3:14
- Label: Capitol Latin; Universal Music Latin; EMI
- Songwriters: Diane Warren; Belinda

Belinda singles chronology
"Constantemente Mía" (2013)	"Nada" (2013)	"I Love You... Te Quiero" (2014)

Lyric Video
- "Nada" on YouTube

Audio
- "Nada" on YouTube

"Nada" (English: "Nothing") is the third single from the Mexican singer-songwriter Belinda, from her fourth studio album Catarsis. It was released on radio on July 5, 2013, by Capitol Latin.

== Background ==
"Nada" was announced as the third single by Belinda via her Twitter account, was announced that the third single to promote the album would be a ballad that tells a story of impossible love. The song was released to radio stations globally in early July 2013.

== Composition ==
The song was written by American Grammy nominated songwriter Diane Warren. While the Spanish adaptation was provided by Spanish singer Belinda, and was produced by the Italian musician and record producer Loris Ceroni, the song is a Spanish adaptation of the song "Weightless". The single is a piano-ballad with a devastating vocals and a sound reminds to the melodic style of her debut self-titled album "Belinda" (2003) and the single "Ángel".

== Video ==
On October 15, 2013, Belinda released a lyrical music video on her official account on YouTube. The video shows Belinda performing the song, it uses winter landscapes as background.

== Chart performance ==
Positions obtained by "Nada"
Country	Chart	List	Peak position
2013
Mexico	Monitor Latino	Top 20 Pop	4
Mexico	Billboard	Mexico Espanol Airplay	22

== Release dates ==
Region	Date	Format	Label	Ref.
Worldwide	July 5, 2013	Radio premiere	UMLE/EMI	
