= Dopamina =

Single by Belinda

from the album Carpe Diem
- Released: August 10, 2010
- Recorded: 2009
- Genre: Electropop; indie pop
- Length: 3:15
- Label: Capitol Latin
- Songwriters: Belinda; Nacho Peregrín; Daniel Barkman; Jörgen Ringqvist
- Producers: Daniel Barkman; Jörgen Ringqvist

Belinda singles chronology
"Egoísta" (2010)	"Dopamina" (2010)	"En El Amor Hay Que Perdonar" (2012)

Music video
- "Dopamina" on YouTube

Audio
- "Dopamina" on YouTube

"Dopamina" (English: "Dopamine"), is a song by Spanish-born Mexican singer Belinda released as second and final single from Carpe Diem on August 10, 2010, on radio stations.

== Information ==
"Dopamina" was written by Belinda, along with her father Nacho Peregrín, Daniel Barkman and Jörgen Ringqvist, who collaborated in the songs "Wacko" and "Maldita Suerte".

=== Track listing ===
Promotional single and digital download

1. "Dopamina" — 3:15

=== Cultures references ===
The song talks about the book, "The Lady of the Camellias", by the French novelist and writer Alexandre Dumas in the verse: << Prefiero aceptar la soledad, que ser la dama de las camelias y morir en la esquizofrenia >>.

== Music video ==
On August 9, 2010, an unofficial music video was released in her YouTube account directed by Kerry Kendall.

The official music video was filmed on October 23, 2010, at Lagunas de Zempoala. It premiered on February 1 through YouTube, and on February 2 on channel Ritmoson Latino in a half-hour special that included an interview with Belinda, It was released on iTunes on January 28, 2011.

The video will tell a story along with Amor Transgénico, a song dedicated to the gay community, to be released after Dopamina, and you have to see them both so you can understand the whole story. the whole video will last 9 minutes.

=== Release date ===
Date	Format	Label
January 28, 2011	Digital download	Capitol Latin
February 1, 2011	Airplay	EMI

== Charts ==
Chart (2011)	Peak position
Mexico (Billboard Mexican Airplay)	17
Mexico (Billboard Mexican Espanol Airplay)	10
Venezuela (Record Report)	130
