= Sal de Mi Piel =

Single by Belinda Peregrín

from the album Carpe Diem and Camaleones Soundtrack
- Released: August 17, 2009 (Airplay); August 18, 2009 (Digital)
- Recorded: 2009, Los Angeles, CA
- Genre: Pop
- Length: 3:29
- Label: EMI Televisa Music
- Songwriter: Belinda Peregrín
- Producer: Áureo Baqueiro

Belinda Peregrín singles chronology
""Te Quiero (Remix)"" (2008)	"Sal de Mi Piel" (2009)	"Egoísta" (2010)

"Sal de Mi Piel" (English: "Get Out of My Skin") is a song by Belinda Peregrín.

== Background ==
The song released airplay on August 17 and digitally on August 18, 2009, included on her third studio album Carpe Diem. The song is written by herself used as main-theme from Mexican telenovela Camaleones starring herself and Alfonso Herrera.

"Sal de Mi Piel" was produced by Áureo Baqueiro and it was originally written for RBD, and finally the producers decided that Belinda should sing the song because she wrote it.

== Track listing ==
iTunes Digital download

1. "Sal De Mi Piel" (Belinda Peregrín) – 3:29

== Chart performance ==
It debuted at number 36, and peaked at number 31 on the U.S. Billboard Latin Pop Songs.

Chart (2009)	Peak position
US Latin Pop Songs (Billboard)	31
Venezuela (Record Report)	176
