= Carpe Diem (Belinda Peregrín album) =

Studio album by Belinda
- Released: March 23, 2010
- Recorded: 2009–2010
- Studio: Various: Darkchild Studios, Los Angeles; Theplay Studios, Madrid; Metropolis Studios, London; Miami; Sweden
- Genre: Electropop
- Length: 40:14
- Language: Spanish; English
- Label: Capitol Latin
- Producer: Various: Belinda Peregrín (also executive); Áureo Baqueiro; Jimmy Harry; Carlos Jean; Arno Elias; Jörgen Ringqvist; Daniel Barkman

Belinda chronology
Utopía (2006)	Carpe Diem (2010)	Catarsis (2013)

Singles from Carpe Diem
- 1. "Egoísta" Released: February 23, 2010; 2. "Dopamina" Released: August 10, 2010

Professional ratings
Review scores
Source	Rating
AllMusic	3.5/5 stars

Carpe Diem is the third studio album by Spanish-Mexican singer songwriter Belinda, released on March 23, 2010, through Capitol Latin. It is primarily electropop music, a departure from the pop rock sound of her previous albums. It debuted on the Billboard Top Latin Albums at number 12, number three on the Latin Pop Albums and number 21 on the Top Heatseekers Albums. In Mexico, entered at number seven and number five in the category in Spanish.

On March 25, two days after its release, Carpe Diem was certified gold; with the help of Belinda offering an autograph session in Mexico City, more than 30,000 copies were sold. The title comes from the Latin phrase that translates literally to "Long live the day" or "Seize the day", coined by the Roman poet Horace. The phrase was adopted by Belinda who was inspired by the movie Dead Poets Society. Carpe Diem contains, as described by the singer, a much happier, upbeat sound with positive lyrics as opposed to her previous album Utopía that had a darker, more personal tone to it.

Among the producers are the Mexican Golden Baqueiro, who produced the theme "Sal de mi Piel" in Los Angeles, and Jimmy Harry, who produced the theme "Egoista" and worked on her previous album Utopía. The album also features production by French artist Arno Elias, who produced the theme "Amor Transgénico" as well as the participation of the Spanish Carlos Jean. Belinda composed most of the material and was involved with the image of the album along with her father, its executive producer.

== Background ==
=== Production ===
The album name is a Latin phrase meaning "Seize the Day" coined by the Roman poet Horace. The album includes 11 tracks and 12 on the iTunes and European editions, composed and produced by herself and would be a change in her musical styles heard on her previous album, Utopía, also include a song titled "Cuida De Mí" written specially for her late grandfather, who died in 2008. The album was recorded mainly in cities such as Los Angeles, Madrid, London, Miami. The album includes contributions from songwriter Nacho Peregrín along with the producers Aureo Baqueiro, Jimmy Harry, Carlos Jean, Arno Elias, as well as Belinda herself, who is accredited as composer, image coordinator and executive producer of the album.

=== Release ===
The released date was originally November 24, 2009, later Belinda confirmed on her Twitter that the release date was postponed from November 24, 2009, to March 23, 2010. The album was released March 12, 2010 in Canadian iTunes by mistake, which led to a mass leak over the internet and popular video site YouTube. The album was taken off from iTunes later that same day. The album debuted at number 1 on both iTunes Mexico and the USA (Latin)'s top album charts on the day of its official release. Two days after its release, the album was certified gold in Mexico on March 25, 2010, after 40,000 copies sold.

== Promotion ==
=== Singles ===
The album's lead single, "Egoísta" released on February 8, a collaboration with Cuban rapper Pitbull, who also appears in the English version of the song. The song peaked at number 28 at the Billboard Hot Latin Songs, on Billboard's Latin Rhythm chart the song peaked at number nine making it her first top ten on the chart. Music videos for both versions were filmed in Mexico City in early May directed by Vance Burberry and Belinda herself.

"Dopamina" was initially released to iTunes on March 16, 2010, as part of a countdown to the album release. The track would later be serviced to radio on August 10 as the second single from the album. The music video was released on February 1, 2011.

=== Promotional singles ===
Prior to the release of the album, three promotional singles were released exclusively on Apple's iTunes Store as a "Countdown to Carpe Diem".

- "Sal de Mi Piel" was the first release of the album, it was released digitally on August 18, 2009, used as the main theme of telenovela Camaleones. This is not the official first single and was previously included on Camaleones soundtrack.
- "Lolita" was the first promotional single, released on March 2, 2010.
- "Culpable" was the second promotional single, released March 9, 2010. The song is a Spanish version of "Into The Morning" by the band The Weekend. Belinda stated via Twitter and during multiple performances of the song that Culpable would be the third single off the album, but the release was eventually canceled along with the planned music video.

=== Other songs ===
- "Wacko" is a cover of the song "Not That Kinda Girl" originally performed by Dutch singer Kim-Lian and Swedish singer Linda Bengtzing, released in October 2009.
- "Lolita" was used to promote and as the theme song for the MTV Latin America series Niñas Mal, but not as the third single from the album. A music video with scenes from the series was premiered on August 23, 2010.
- "Amor Transgenico" was rumored to be released as a single at some point during the album's promotion but never materialized. A music video was filmed at the same time along with "Dopamina" and "Gaia", and were to be a trilogy starting with Dopamina, continuing through Amor Transgenico, and concluding with Gaia. All three videos were filmed and completed, but the release dates for Amor Transgenico and Gaia were scrapped and as of today no music videos have been released. Different previews and parts of the videos can be found on YouTube but nowhere can the entirety of the videos can be found.

== Track listing ==
No.	Title	Writer(s)	Producer(s)	Length
1.	"Amor Transgénico"	Arno Elias; Belinda; Nacho Peregrín	Arno Elias	3:22
2.	"Egoísta" (featuring Pitbull)	Jimmy Harry; Belinda; Nacho; Armando Pérez	Jimmy Harry	3:24
3.	"Dopamina"	Belinda; Nacho; Jörgen Ringqvist; D. Barkman	Jörgen Ringqvist, Daniel Barkman	3:15
4.	"Culpable"	Andrea Wasse; Lincoln Cushman; Ryan Ford; Jay Westman; Belinda; Nacho	Carlos Jean	3:55
5.	"Lolita"	Harry; Belinda; Nacho; Alaina Beaton	Jimmy Harry	3:26
6.	"Cuida De Mí"	Carlos Jean; Belinda; Nacho	Carlos Jean	4:59
7.	"Mi Religión"	Belinda; Nacho; Lars "Quang" Nielsen; Niklas Nielsen; Gabrial Ssezibwa; Rene Prang	Carlos Jean	3:53
8.	"Wacko"	Belinda; Nacho; Jörgen Rinqvist; D. Barkman	Jörgen Ringqvist, Daniel Barkman	3:40
9.	"Maldita Suerte"	Harry; Belinda; Nacho; Ringqvist	Jimmy Harry	3:12
10.	"Sal de Mi Piel"	Belinda	Aureo Baqueiro	3:26
11.	"Gaia"	Harry; Belinda; Nacho	Jimmy Harry	3:39
Total length:				40:41

iTunes bonus track
No.	Title	Writer(s)	Length
12.	"Duele"	Cathy Dennis; Chris Braide; Belinda; Nacho	3:58

Europe bonus track
No.	Title	Writer(s)	Length
12.	"Egoísta" (English version) (featuring Pitbull)	Harry; Belinda; Nacho; Pérez; Jessie Malakouti	3:24

== Charts ==
The album debuted on the Billboard Top Latin Albums at number 12, also debuted at number three on the Latin Pop Albums and number 21 on the Top Heatseekers Albums. On the Mexican Albums Chart, the album debuted at number seven, and on the Mexican International Albums Chart at number five.

=== Charts ===
Chart (2010)	Peak position
Argentinian Albums Chart	5
Mexican Albums Chart	7
Mexican International Albums Chart	5
U.S. Billboard Top Latin Albums	12
U.S. Billboard Latin Pop Albums	3
U.S. Billboard Top Heatseekers	21
U.S. Billboard Top Heatseekers (Pacific)	9

== Sales and certifications ==
Region	Certification	Certified units/sales
Mexico (AMPROFON)	Gold	30,000^{^}
^{^} Shipments figures based on certification alone.

== Release history ==
Region	Date	Label
Mexico	March 23, 2010	EMI
United States	March 23, 2010	Capitol Latin
United Kingdom	March 23, 2010	EMI
Brazil	April 5, 2010	EMI
Germany	April 30, 2010	EMI; Capitol
Austria	April 30, 2010	EMI; Capitol
Spain	November 16, 2010	EMI
