= Modes of Transportation Vol. 2 =

Studio album by Spookey Ruben
- Released: Dec 19, 1998
- Recorded: Unknown
- Genre: Indie rock
- Labels: Hi-hat Recordings, Sony
- Producer: Spookey Ruben

Spookey Ruben chronology
Wendy McDonald (1996)	Modes of Transportation Vol. 2 (1998)	Brunch (2000)

Modes of Transportation Vol. 2: What's a Boy to Do? is an album released by Spookey Ruben in 1998, and was only ever released in Japan, but is now available as an import through Amazon.com and by digital release. The album had three singles reach the top 20 following its Japanese release.

Tracks from this album later appeared on his double album Bed and Breakfast more than three years later. In an interview, Spookey explained, "I got permission to use them (to re-use for the double album). They’re [TVT Records] going to get a cut off this record."

== Reception ==
Professional ratings
Review scores
Source	Rating
FD	(favorable)

As this album was never commercially released in the United States, there are very few reviews published for it. One review by the website FrankDoris.com exclaims, "What's A Boy to Do? is a wild, exhilarating melange of styles and sounds, colliding, blending together, copulating and producing bizarre, mutated offspring. Take the first track, "Sex Traffic," (gotta be an homage to Kraftwerk's Sex Object")—a dizzying mix of French female vocal samples, snapping synthesizers, rubber-band ostinato bass, gritty electronic drums, sampled squealing tires and robotic monotonous vocals intoning "Sex Traffic" over it all—but it's freakin' fantastic! Then before you've recovered, Ruben jump-cuts into "My Female Friends," its gorgeous piano chords, buoyant vocal and synth melodies and galloping rhythm three minutes and forty-four seconds of pure pop adrenaline. The record is a roller coaster thrill-ride of moods and kaleidoscopic instrumental sounds, from unbelievably pure and well-recorded acoustic guitars, glockenspiels and percussion to unbelievably processed squealing synths and sampled vocals. Actually, some of the sounds are completely unrecognizable."

== Track listing ==
1. Sex Traffic
2. My Female Friends
3. My Favorite Movie
4. Why Did I Do What I Did
5. Someone Else
6. Who Pulls You Through
7. N Kinski
8. Don't Take Your Dog To The Park
9. Dizzy Playground
10. Roncesvalles
11. Memory
12. Lazy
13. Overhill (Bonus)
14. Mennonite Lady (Bonus)
