= Te Voy A Esperar =

Single by Juan Magán & Belinda

from the album Tad, The Lost Explorer soundtrack
- Released: August 7, 2012
- Recorded: 2012
- Genre: Dance, electronic, pop
- Length: 3:35
- Label: Sony Music Spain
- Songwriters: Juan Manuel Magán González, Carlos Andrés Alcaraz Gómez, David López Cendros, Diego Alejandro Vanegas Londono
- Producer: Juan Magán

Juan Magán singles chronology
"Se Vuelve Loca" (2012)	"Te Voy A Esperar" (2012)	"Join The Party" (2012)

Belinda singles chronology
"En El Amor Hay Que Perdonar" (2012)	"Te Voy A Esperar" (2012)	"En la Obscuridad" (2012)

Music video
- "Te Voy A Esperar" on YouTube

"Te Voy A Esperar" (English: I'm Gonna Wait For You) is the main theme song of the 2012 Spanish animated film Tad, The Lost Explorer, performed by the Spanish DJ Juan Magán and the Mexican singer Belinda.

== Information ==
The song was co-written and produced by Juan Magán, although the movie soundtrack is composed by Zacarías M. de la Riva, the main theme is performed by Juan Magán with Belinda, which was peaked at number 1 on Spain iTunes charts and Spotify. On the other hand, the original movie soundtrack also features with songs of the groups One Direction and The Monomes. The song spent 10 weeks at number 1 in the charts of Spain and a total of 43 weeks in that chart. It was certified platinum in Spain for sales of over 60.000 units. In Mexico, the song was only released for airplay and peaked at number 7.

The single was released in Spain on August 7, 2012, and released in Mexico on January 8, 2013. The song appears as a bonus track in the Spanish edition of the album Catarsis from the Mexican singer Belinda.

=== Video ===
The official music video was directed by Jesús De La Vega. It was released on July 24, 2012, and digitally on January 22, 2013. The video shows Belinda and Juan Magán performing the song in the recording studio, also features some scenes of the film. The music video was the most watched in Spain on YouTube. Currently, it has over 18.4 million views.

== Track listing ==
Digital download (Spain)
No.	Title	Length
1.	"Te Voy A Esperar"	3:35

Digital download (Mexico, Colombia, Argentina, Brazil, Venezuela, Ecuador, Chile, Peru, Paraguay, United States)
No.	Title	Length
1.	"Te Voy A Esperar"	3:13

Digital download (Mexico)
No.	Title	Length
1.	"Te Voy A Esperar"	3:13
2.	"Te Voy A Esperar" (OST Tadeo Jones) (Video)	3:38

== Charts ==
=== Weekly charts ===
Chart (2012)	Peak position
Spain (PROMUSICAE)	1
Mexico (AMPROFON)	7
Chile (IFPI)	4
Ecuador (IFPI)	3

=== Year-end charts ===
Chart (2012)	Position
Spain	5

== Certifications ==
Region	Certification	Certified units/sales
Spain (Promusicae)	Platinum	40,000^{*}
^{*} Sales figures based on certification alone.
