= Lolita (Belinda Peregrín song) =

Song by Belinda

from the album Carpe Diem
- Released: March 2, 2010
- Recorded: 2009–2010
- Genre: Power pop; Electropop; Nu rave
- Length: 3:26
- Label: Capitol Latin
- Songwriter(s): Jimmy Harry, Belinda, Nacho Peregrín, Alaina Beaton
- Producer(s): Jimmy Harry

Audio
- "Lolita" on YouTube

"Lolita" is a song by Spanish singer-songwriter Belinda, released as the first promotional single from her third studio album Carpe Diem.

The song was composed by Jimmy Harry, Alaina Beaton, Belinda and Nacho Peregín.

== Cultural references ==
The song refers to the 1955 novel of the same name in the line "Sin duda Nabokov fue el que me escribió", which literally translates as "No doubt, Nabokov was the one who wrote me."

=== Niñas mal ===
Lolita was used as the opening theme of MTV Latin America's soap opera Niñas mal – Bad Girls in English – which premiered on September 10, 2010. A music video was filmed and shown on the channel on August 23, 2010.

== Music video ==
The music video was filmed in July, 2010 in Bogotá, Colombia and was directed and produced by MTV's creative team. It shows the main characters of the soap opera "Niñas Mal" causing chaos in a supermarket.

== Release ==
The song was released as a digital download via the iTunes Store on March 2, 2010.

Service	Date	Format	Label
iTunes	March 2, 2010	Digital download	Capitol Latin

=== Track list ===
iTunes Digital download

1. "Lolita" (Jimmy Harry, Belinda, Nacho Peregrín & Alaina Beaton) — 3:26

== Versions ==
- Lolita (Album Version)
- Lolita (Niñas Mal version)

== Charts ==
Chart (2010)	Peak position
Venezuelan Airplay Chart	80
Venezuelan Latin Airplay Chart	14
