= Catarsis =

Studio album by Belinda
- Released: July 2, 2013
- Recorded: Miami, Florida, Mexico City, Mexico (2011–2013)
- Genres: Pop; electropop; dance-pop
- Length: 42:05
- Languages: Spanish; English
- Labels: Capitol Latin; Universal Latin
- Producers: Lavi Hoss “Lavi Beats"; Víctor "El Nasi" Martínez; Joan Ortíz; Jorge Villamizar; Andrés Castro; Vein; Nacho Peregrin (exec.)

Belinda chronology
Carpe Diem (2010)	Catarsis (2013)	Indómita (2025)

Singles from Catarsis
- 1. "En El Amor Hay Que Perdonar" Released: June 19, 2012; 2. "En la Obscuridad" Released: November 12, 2012; 3. "Nada" Released: July 5, 2013; 4. "I Love You... Te Quiero" Released: January 22, 2014

Catarsis (English: Catharsis) is the fourth studio album by Spanish-Mexican singer-songwriter Belinda, released on July 2, 2013 through Capitol Latin.

== Background ==
=== Production ===
In October 2011, Belinda moved to Miami, Florida to begin the process of recording the album. She created a recording studio at home which gave her the flexibility that she had not experienced before making an album. This allowed her to work at her own pace with new composers and work both lyrically and vocally. Belinda co-wrote each of the songs on the album.

Belinda worked with a close-knit group of award-winning producers and songwriters such as Victor "El Nasi", Joan Ortiz, Jorge Villamizar, Andres Castro, Lavi Beats, Lavi Hoss and Vein. The album shows a more dance-pop sound, combined with an urban flavor and lyrics with popular appeal.

== Promotion ==
She performed "En El Amor Hay Que Perdonar" on 2012 Premios Juventud, Kids' Choice Awards Mexico 2012, Despierta América, Hoy, and La Voz... México; "Te Voy A Esperar" at the Premios Ondas 2012 with Juan Magán; and "En La Obscuridad" at the Premios Telehit 2012, Tour Positivo and Mexico Sueña. She has made many interviews around Europe, Latin America and United States to promote the album, she also has been on a promo tour across United States, Spain and Mexico. She was again on Hoy on March 27, 2013.

=== Singles ===
- "En El Amor Hay Que Perdonar" is the official lead single, released for digital download on iTunes on June 19, 2012 in Mexico. The song was co-produced by Victor El Nasi and Joan Ortiz. A lyric music video was released on Belinda's official YouTube channel on June 16, 2012 The music video was filmed in June in Acapulco. The video was uploaded to Belinda's official VEVO channel on August 17, 2012. The single debuted at number seven and topped the Mexican Single Charts.
- "En la Obscuridad" was announced as the second single by Belinda via her Twitter account; it was released to Mexican radio on November 9, 2012. The music video was filmed over two days in December 2012 at the National Art Museum (next to the Palacio de Bellas Artes in Mexico City) and at Churubusco Studios, where she used a 360 degree platform. The music video premiered on Belinda's official VEVO account on February 22, 2013.
- "Nada" was announced as the third single by Belinda via her Twitter account; it was released to Mexican radio on July 5, 2013.
- "I Love You... Te Quiero" was announced as the fourth single by Belinda via her Twitter account; it was released globally to the radios in late January, 2014.

Other songs

- "Te Voy A Esperar" (which features Juan Magán), for the soundtrack of the film Las aventuras de Tadeo Jones was digitally released in Spain, debuting and staying at number one for eleven weeks. It received platinum certification by PROMUSICAE for sales of over 60,000 copies. In Mexico, the song was only released for airplay and peaked at number seven.
- Bailaría Sobre El Fuego (Ballad version) was released on June 10, 2013 on iTunes and others digital stores as part of the promotion of the album.
- Dame Más was released on September 10, 2015 as promo single in Colombia.

=== Tour ===
The Catarsis Tour began in June 2013, in Monterrey.

== Track listing ==
No.	Title	Writer(s)	Producer(s)	Length
1.	"Dame Más"	Belinda Peregrín; Gavriel Aminov; J.I Peregrín; Paolo Prudencio	Vein	3:09
2.	"En la Obscuridad"	Belinda; J.I Peregrín; Víctor Martinez; Joan M. Ortíz	Víctor "El Nasi"	3:27
3.	"En El Amor Hay Que Perdonar"	Belinda; Víctor Martínez; J.I Peregrín; Joan M. Ortíz	Víctor "El Nasi"	3:59
4.	"I Love You... Te Quiero" (featuring Pitbull)	Belinda; Aminov; J.I Peregrín; Prudencio; Armando Pérez; Lavi Hos	Vein; Lavi Beats	3:36
5.	"Dime Si Es Amor"	Belinda; Aminov; J.I Peregrín; Prudencio	Vein	3:27
6.	"Como Si Fuéramos Novios"	Belinda; Víctor Martínez; J.I Peregrín; Joan M. Ortíz Espada; José M. Gómez Martínez; Aminov	Víctor "El Nasi"	3:54
7.	"Bailaría Sobre El Fuego" (dubstep)	Belinda; Aminov; J.I Peregrín; Lavi Hoss	Vein; Lavi Beats	3:20
8.	"Vuelve A Mí"	Belinda; Aminov; J.I Peregrín; Prudencio	Vein	3:18
9.	"Litost"	Belinda; Aminov; J.I Peregrín	Vein	3:26
10.	"No Me Vuelvo A Enamorar"	Belinda; José Luis Ortega; Juan Andrés Vergara; Diego Benlliure	Loris Ceroni	3:27
11.	"Nada"	Diane Warren; Belinda	Loris Ceroni	3:14
12.	"After We Make Love" (featuring Vein)	Belinda; Aminov; J.I Peregrín; Lavi Hoss	Vein	3:48
Total length:				42:05

iTunes bonus track
No.	Title	Writer(s)	Producer(s)	Length
13.	"Bailaría Sobre El Fuego" (ballad)	Belinda; Aminov; J.I Peregrín; Lavi Hoss	Vein	4:11
Total length:				46:16

Spain bonus track
No.	Title	Writer(s)	Producer(s)	Length
13.	"Te Voy A Esperar" (featuring Juan Magán)	Juan Manuel Magán González; Carlos Andrés Alcaraz Gómez; David López Cendros; Diego Alejandro Vanegas Londono	Juan Magán	3:35
Total length:				45:40

== Charts and sales ==
The album debuted on the Billboard Top Latin Albums at number four and at number three on the Latin Pop Albums, becoming her highest debut on the U.S. charts compared to her previous albums, selling over 1,450 copies in its first week. On the Mexican Albums Chart, the album debuted at number one, becoming her second album to top the chart.

Chart (2013)	Peak position
Argentinian Albums Chart	3
Mexican Albums Chart	1
Mexican International Albums Chart	1
U.S. Billboard Top Latin Albums	4
U.S. Billboard Latin Pop Albums	2

== Release history ==
Country	Date	Label
Mexico	July 2, 2013	Capitol Latin
United States	July 2, 2013	Universal Music Latin
United Kingdom	July 2, 2013	EMI Latin
Argentina	July 11, 2013	Universal Music Latin
Spain	July 16, 2013	Capitol Latin
Peru	July 27, 2013	Capitol Latin
Ecuador	July 27, 2013	Universal Music Latin
Brazil	August 2, 2013	EMI Music
