= Modes of Transportation Vol. 1 =

Studio album by Spookey Ruben
- Released: August 25, 1995
- Recorded: March 9–15, 1995
- Length: 40:43
- Label: TVT Records

Spookey Ruben chronology
Modes of Transportation Vol. 1 (1995)	Wendy McDonald – Live in Japan (1998)

Modes of Transportation Vol. 1 is the debut album by Spookey Ruben, released in 1995.

== Track listing ==
1. "Terra Magnifica" – 1:04
2. "These Days Are Old" – 3:44
3. "Crystal Cradle" – 3:51
4. "Running Away" – 3:19
5. "Welcome to the House of Food" – 4:59
6. "Wendy Mcdonald" – 4:03
7. "The Size of You" – 2:36
8. "It's Not What You Do It's You" – 4:46
9. "Mars" – 0:34
10. "Leave the City" – 4:37
11. "Growing Up is Over?" - 2:39
12. "Donate your Heart to a Stranger" - 6:30
13. "Life Insurance" - 5:01
  - I)snowman
  - II)deepsea-diver
  - III)stolen car

== Critical reception ==
Professional ratings
Review scores
Source	Rating
Allmusic	4 /5 stars

In music site Allmusic, reviewer Stanton Swihart states, "As inventive as it is, the album perhaps draws a bit too freely from the XTC melodic bag of tricks, and occasionally Ruben's most experimental quirks sabotage his songs. But on the whole, Modes of Transportation, Vol. 1 is a confectionary treat."

== Popular cultural impact ==
The song These Days Are Old is used as theme song of German TV talk show Zimmer frei! (roughly: "room to let").

== Production ==
- Art director: Spookey Ruben
- All songs written, arranged and produced by: Spookey Ruben
- Engineers: Spookey Ruben, Gadi Foltys, Mark Plati, Brad 'Merlin' Nelson
- Mastering: Howie Weinberg
- Design: Helios
- Photography: Taralea Cutler, Michael Benabib Musician Photography , Luciana Haill, Felix Wittholtz, Spookey Ruben
