= Spookey Ruben =

Canadian musician and filmmaker (Alan F. Deil; born 1972)

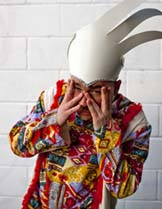
- Spookey Ruben in 2009

Background information
- Born: Alan F. Deil; Ottawa, Ontario, Canada
- Genres: Indie rock, alternative rock, power pop, hardcore punk (early), progressive metal (early), thrash metal (early)
- Years active: 1995–present
- Labels: TVT Records, MCA Records, EMI Records, Zomba Records, Hi-Hat Recordings, Universal Records, Quattro Label
- Website: http://www.spookeyruben.com

Spookey Ruben (born 1972), birth name Alan F. Deil, is a Canadian musician, producer, songwriter, composer, and filmmaker. Best known for his song and music video "These Days Are Old", Spookey's songwriting and eccentric production techniques often contrast high and low vocals, analogue keyboards, found sounds, sampled beats and stringed instruments such as electric and Spanish guitar. Spookey has released seven full-length solo albums.

== Early life ==
Due to his father's work as an ESA aerospace engineer, Spookey grew up in Germany, the Netherlands, and Washington, D.C. In his childhood, Spookey's parents insisted he take up an instrument and so he chose classical guitar. At age 13 he got his hands on his first electric guitar and spent the remainder of his teenage years playing in an array of hardcore and metal bands, most notably progressive thrash metal band Transilience. It was at this time that he received his nickname "Spooky", a result of high-school friends teasing him for his long hair and "Satanic T-shirts". At age 19, he moved to Toronto, Ontario, and enrolled in film school at York University. It was at this time that Ruben accumulated musical ideas via four-track recorder.

== Recording artist ==
Spookey's home recording experiments led to the making of his solo debut album Modes of Transportation Vol. 1 (TVT Records) which was partially engineered and mixed by Gadi Foltys, Don Kerr, Brad Nelson and Mark Plati (best known for his work with David Bowie). International critical acclaim followed, hailing the album as the "Pet Sounds of the 90s" and "lo-fi pop masterpiece". In 1996, Ruben contributed to the AIDS benefit album Offbeat: A Red Hot Soundtrip produced by the Red Hot Organization. Disputes with TVT resulted in his leaving the label and years of apparent silence. Eventually, in 2002, Ruben simultaneously released two separate CDs entitled Bed and Breakfast (Hi-Hat/Zomba) that were later repackaged as a double album. Alone at the Zoo, co-produced by John McEntire of Tortoise/The Sea and Cake was released as a special limited compilation of demos in 2003. On 16 June 2009, his full-length album, Mechanical Royalty, was released in Canada on Hi-Hat/Sonic Unyon. He has since released a new EP, Shackleton (2010), Welsh Rarebits (2012), and Modes III (2016). and is playing live dates in North America and Europe. His most recent album, Toronto, You've Changed was released on 2025.

== Filmmaker ==
In 2008, Spookey Ruben began filming a series of short films (Spookey Ruben's Dizzy Playground) for Exclaim! and AUX Television. There have been seven episodes, which include musicians from various bands.

Episodes

- Omen of the Goblet – Featuring Brendan Canning of Broken Social Scene
- Exit to Panama – Featuring Hannah Krapivinsky and Anna Edwards of Foxfire
- Space Package – Featuring John McEntire of Tortoise/The Sea and Cake
- Cavity Central – Featuring Melissa Auf der Maur of Hole/The Smashing Pumpkins
- Natural Born Grannies – Featuring Ariel Pink
- The Adventures of Spaghetti Cowboy - Featuring Leslie Feist of Feist/Broken Social Scene
- Puzzleface - Featuring Denis Bélanger of Voivod, Maylee Todd, Rodrigo Gudiño and film director Ken Russell

== Personal life ==
Spookey married Japanese painter Yori Hatakeyama on 2 November 2019.

== Discography ==
=== Albums ===
- Modes of Transportation Vol. 1 (TVT records 1995, Quattro Japan 1996, Intercord Germany 1996, EMI UK 1997)
- Wendy Mcdonald – Live in Japan EP (TVT records 1996)
- Modes of Transportation Vol. 2: What's a Boy to do? (Quattro Japan 1998)
- Brunch (Quattro Japan 2000)
- Bed and Breakfast (Hi-Hat/Zomba – released separately in 2002, 2003 then repackaged in 2006)
- Alone At The Zoo (Hi-Hat 2003)
- Ausfahrt Walsrode EP (Lamm/Universal 2006)
- Mechanical Royalty (Hi-Hat/Sonic Unyon – special edition EP 2008; full length edition 2009)
- Shackleton (Hi-Hat – special limited edition EP 2010)
- Welsh Rarebits (Hi-Hat 2012)
- Modes III (Hi-Hat 2016)
- Toronto, You've Changed (2025)

=== Singles ===
- "These days are old" (1995)
- "Running Away" (1995)
- "Wendy Mcdonald" (1996)
- "Brand New Game" (2002)
- "Shauna" (2003)
- "Glenn Take Care" (2003)
- "Are There Any People You Don't Love?" (2006)
- "Superpoke" (2009)
- "Mr Everywhere" (2017)
- "Midsummer Dropout" (2019)
- "When Your Heart Says Yes" (2020)
- "Pliny the Elder" (2024) with Vinnie Colaiuta
- "The Audition" (2024) with Ronald Bruner, Jr.
- "Say!" (2025)
