= Thomas Zander Bleck =

Zander Bleck
- Born: 1985 (age 39–40); Hunterdon County, New Jersey, U.S.
- Origin: Los Angeles, California, U.S.
- Genres: Rock, electro, pop
- Occupation(s): Musician, singer, songwriter
- Instrument: Vocals
- Years active: 2009–present
- Labels: Interscope, 2101 Records Rainbow Music
- Website: www.zanderbleck.com

Thomas Zander Bleck Jr. (born 1985), known professionally as Zander Bleck, is an American recording artist, vocalist, and songwriter.

== Early life and education ==
Bleck was born in Hunterdon County, New Jersey and attended Voorhees High School, as part of the class of 2003.

== Career ==
After high school, he began modeling internationally and simultaneously started his first band “Monument”. In 2008, he left the band and began focusing on solo work. In 2009, Bleck self-released an EP titled Zander Bleck. Soon after, he lent his vocals to A&R Nima Nasseri for a remake of the Tears for Fears classic "Everybody Wants to Rule The World". Released on Star 69 Records, the track peaked at #5 on the Billboard Dance Charts.

Following the first album, Bleck collaborated with Holly Knight, on the song “Temptation”. The song caught the attention of producer RedOne leading to a recording contract with Interscope Records.

In 2012, Bleck released Temptation, his first single on Interscope, produced by RedOne and another single, Bring It On which was produced by Mutt Lange. In 2014, Bleck left Interscope following reorganization of the company.

In 2017, Bleck independently released his single, “Alive”.

Bleck was featured on the cover of EILE Magazine in August 2017.

In 2018, Bleck released "Mercy me".
