= I Love You... Te Quiero =

Single by Belinda featuring Pitbull

from the album Catarsis
- Released: January 22, 2014
- Recorded: 2013
- Genre: Dance-pop; dubstep; house
- Length: 3:36
- Label: Capitol Latin; Universal Music Latino; EMI
- Songwriters: Belinda; Gavriel Aminov; José Ignacio Peregrín; Paolo Prudencio; Pitbull; Lavi Hoss
- Producers: Vein; Lavi Beats or Lavi Hoss

Belinda singles chronology
"Nada" (2013)	"I Love You... Te Quiero" (2014)	"Translation" (2014)

Pitbull singles chronology
"I'm a Freak" (2014)	"I Love You... Te Quiero" (2014)	"Mmm Yeah" (2014)

Music video
- "I Love You... Te Quiero" on YouTube

Audio
- "I Love You... Te Quiero" on YouTube

"I Love You... Te Quiero" is the fourth and final single from the Spanish singer-songwriter Belinda, featuring American rapper Pitbull, from her fourth studio album Catarsis. It was released on radio on January 22, 2014 by Capitol Latin. This is the second collaboration of both singers after "Egoísta" (2010).

== Background ==
"I Love You... Te Quiero" was announced as the fourth single by Belinda via her Twitter account. The song was released to radio stations globally in late January 2014.

"I'm so excited. The radio positions gained impressive, in a few days (the song) is up more than 10 positions, so I'm very grateful to the public that is and has been requesting it. This song is growing much faster than the other, which has surprised and happy, just like Pitbull, who is also part of this song."

— Belinda, Perdiódico Noroeste

== Composition ==
The single is a powerful Spanglish pop-dance production with a dose of electronic sounds and dubstep. "I Love You... Te Quiero" is co-written by Belinda, Pitbull, "Gavriel “Vein" Aminov, José Ignacio Peregrín, Paolo Prudencio and Lavi "Lavi Beats" Hoss. The song was produced by Vein and Lavi Beats.

"Originally, I had not planned to record with Pitbull, but my producer is his friend and partner. One day, Vein provided me a beat that was originally for Pitbull, I was surprised. We talked to him and he gave me the song with the condition that we recorded it together."

— Belinda, ElNuevoHerald.com

== Video ==
The official video was released on June 25, 2014 on Belinda's VEVO official account, and released on iTunes the same day. The video was directed by Ernesto Yáñez and filmed in Zacatecas city in March 2014. Nearly two million pesos were invested in the video, exceeding her last production "En la Obscuridad".

== Chart performance ==
Positions obtained by "I Love You... Te Quiero"
Country	Chart	List	Peak position
2013 - 2014
United States	Billboard	Latin Pop Digital Songs	19
Mexico	Billboard	México Español Airplay	13
Mexico	Billboard	México Airplay	33
Mexico	Monitor Latino	Top 20 Pop	4
Mexico	Monitor Latino	Top 20 General	19

== Release dates ==
Region	Date	Format	Label	Ref.
Worldwide	January 22, 2014	Radio premiere	UMLE/EMI	
