= I Am Music Tour =

2008–09 concert tour by Lil Wayne

- Tour by Lil Wayne
- Associated album: Tha Carter III
- Start date: December 14, 2008
- End date: April 10, 2009
- Legs: 2
- No. of shows: 39

Lil Wayne concert chronology
- Cash Money/Ruff Ryders Tour (2000); I Am Music Tour (2009); America's Most Wanted Tour (2009)

The I Am Music Tour, was a concert tour headlined by American rapper Lil Wayne. The tour was following his Grammy Award-winning album Tha Carter III.

The tour concluded with America's Most Wanted Tour featured Wayne's record label, Young Money Entertainment, and set a record for hip-hop acts with $42 million grossed.

== Opening acts ==
- Keri Hilson
- Gym Class Heroes
- Keyshia Cole
- T-Pain
- Porcelain Black
- Gorilla Zoe

== Tour dates ==
Date	City	Country	Venue
December 14, 2008	Miami	United States	American Airlines Arena
December 16, 2008	Houston	United States	Toyota Center
December 19, 2008	Dallas	United States	American Airlines Center
December 21, 2008	Los Angeles	United States	Gibson Amphitheatre
December 22, 2008	Los Angeles	United States	Gibson Amphitheatre
December 23, 2008	Oakland	United States	Oracle Arena
December 26, 2008	Detroit	United States	Joe Louis Arena
December 27, 2008	Chicago	United States	United Center
December 28, 2008	Camden	United States	Susquehanna Bank Center
December 29, 2008	Greensboro	United States	Greensboro Coliseum
December 30, 2008	Washington, D.C.	United States	Verizon Center
December 31, 2008	Atlanta	United States	Philips Arena
January 2, 2009	Charlotte	United States	Time Warner Cable Arena
January 3, 2009	Hampton	United States	Hampton Coliseum
January 4, 2009	Cleveland	United States	Quicken Loans Arena
January 8, 2009	St. Louis	United States	Chaifetz Arena
January 9, 2009	Kansas City	United States	Sprint Center
January 11, 2009	New Orleans	United States	New Orleans Arena
January 14, 2009	Montreal	Canada	Bell Centre
January 15, 2009	Toronto	Canada	Air Canada Centre
January 16, 2009	Uniondale	United States	Nassau Coliseum
January 17, 2009	Hartford	United States	New England Dodge Music Center
January 18, 2009	Atlantic City	United States	Boardwalk Hall
January 19, 2009	Worcester	United States	DCU Center
January 22, 2009	Calgary	Canada	Pengrowth Saddledome
January 24, 2009	Vancouver	Canada	Rogers Arena
January 25, 2009	Seattle	United States	KeyArena
January 27, 2009	San Diego	United States	Cox Arena
January 28, 2009	Phoenix	United States	US Airways Center
March 17, 2009	Providence	United States	Dunkin' Donuts Center
March 18, 2009	Wallingford	United States	Chevrolet Theatre
March 19, 2009	Newark	United States	Prudential Center
March 20, 2009	Baltimore	United States	1st Mariner Arena
March 21, 2009	Indianapolis	United States	Conseco Fieldhouse
March 22, 2009	Memphis	United States	FedExForum
March 23, 2009	San Antonio	United States	AT&T Center
March 25, 2009	Oklahoma City	United States	Ford Center
March 28, 2009	Paradise	United States	Palms Hotel
March 29, 2009	Los Angeles	United States	Gibson Amphitheatre
March 30, 2009	Sacramento	United States	ARCO Arena
March 31, 2009	Salt Lake City	United States	EnergySolutions Arena
April 4, 2009	Honolulu	United States	Neal S. Blaisdell Center
April 6, 2009	Omaha	United States	Qwest Center Omaha
April 10, 2009	Hoffman Estates	United States	Sears Centre

== See also ==
- Lil Wayne
- Nicki Minaj
