= Mechanical Royalty =

Studio album by Spookey Ruben
- Released: 2008, 2009
- Recorded: Unknown
- Genre: Indie rock
- Label: Hi-hat Recordings, Sonic Unyon
- Producer: Spookey Ruben

Spookey Ruben chronology
Ausfahrt Walsrode (2006)	Mechanical Royalty (2008)

Mechanical Royalty is a limited edition EP released by the Canadian musician Spookey Ruben in 2008. A full length LP was released with the help of Sonic Unyon in 2009. Though the track-listing differs between the LP and the EP, all but one song from the EP remain ("Eyes Can See"). The album is described as a 'concept album about a kingdom of robots who are attacked by the humans who originally created them because they possess a magnetic force that keeps harmony in society that the humans want back for themselves.'

== Track listing (LP) ==
1. "Cat & Mouse" – 1:52
2. "Rachel" – 2:56
3. "Just Another Way" – 3:08
4. "If You Don't Wanna Know" – 3:25
5. "U Don't Know What You're Missing" – 3:15
6. "American Processed Cheese" – 2:21
7. "Eyes of Man" – 4:18
8. "Mechanical Royalty" – 15:21
  - Agent Steel
  - Attack at Krankshaft Castle
  - And Thus He Rusts (King's Lament)
  - The Quirks of Queen of Quartz and Quarks
  - Don Silicon
  - Secrets in the Motherboard
  - Triumph on Magnetic Hill
9. "Superpoke" – 4:29
10. "Testimony" – 4:25

== Review ==
Professional ratings
Review scores
Source	Rating
sceneandheard.ca	(favorable)

The music site sceneandheard.ca gave the Mechanical Royalty EP a favorable review, stating, "The overall feel of the album is, as always, techno (blips dot the album as do other computerized treatments), with a distinct retro feel that may be off-putting to some. But if you give it a chance (three or four solid spins) you start to appreciate the crafty tune-smithing and zany approach to music Spooky [sic] is known for during his decade-plus career"

A review by Antimusic states, "Mechanical Royalty (a pun, alluding not only to the album cover and storyline of the title track, but also to a music business term) is an intense 70s/80s rollercoaster ride, but its Spookey's point of view that makes it feel inviting and brand new, consistently dishing up his excitement for music in his own special heartfelt way."

== Production ==
- Written and Produced by Spookey Ruben
- Co-produced by Carson Cohen, Gene Hughes, Chris Fudurich & Ed Krautner
