= RedOne Records =

Moroccan record label

- Parent company: Universal Music Group
- Founded: 2014
- Founder: RedOne
- Distributor(s): Universal Music Group (Worldwide); Interscope Capitol Labels Group (in the US & UK); EMI Records (other markets)
- Genre: Dance; pop; rock
- Country of origin: United States

2101 Records
- Founded: 2010
- Founder: RedOne
- Distributor(s): Universal Music Group (Worldwide); Interscope Capitol Labels Group (in the US & UK); EMI Records (other markets)
- Genre: Dance; pop; rock
- Country of origin: United States
- Location: Hollywood, California

RedOne Records is an international record label founded by Moroccan-Swedish record producer RedOne in 2014. He is the label's main producer. In 2010, RedOne had established 2101 Records. Previously an imprint under Republic Records, RedOne distributes music under Capitol Music Group.

== History ==
2101 Records was founded in 2010 by record producer RedOne, as a joint venture with Universal Music Group. On 1 August 2010, RedOne and 2101 Records signed a deal for distribution via Cash Money Records, new home for Mohombi, whereas artist DJ Havana Brown and Dive Bella Dive were distributed via Island Records. Priyanka Chopra, Zander Bleck are distributed via Interscope Records and 7Lions and Porcelain Black are distributed independently.

In February 2013, Ray De La Garza, formerly vice president of programming at Radio Disney, was appointed the new general manager of 2101 Records.

On May 1, 2013 the label announced that it had signed a distribution deal with Universal Music Group's Capitol Records.

=== Milestones ===
Disc jockey turned pop sensation, Havana Brown, won 2101 Records their first platinum single with "We Run The Night". Additionally, Brown gained a number-one dance hit in the United States with "Big Banana". Also releasing dance-pop tracks through the label, Porcelain Black, gained commercial success in American nightclubs with the top ten hit, "Naughty Naughty" and a top forty hit with "This Is What Rock n' Roll Looks Like", the latter gaining significant buzz for the singer and label. Mohombi, who was the first artist signed to the label, gained a number-one hit across 14 countries with "Bumpy Ride". The record reached double platinum in Sweden and gold in Denmark, making the labels first certifications in those countries. Although never releasing a full-length album since its inception, the label has released an EP and remix album; When the Lights Go Out (released through 2102 Records and Island) and an extended play maxi containing various remixes of "Naughty Naughty" by Porcelain Black. In 2012, RedOne worked with Bollywood actress Priyanka Chopra on her debut single, "In My City". The single which features will.i.am made its debut on Thursday Night Football on the NFL Network.

== Roster ==
=== 2101 Records ===
- 7Lions
- Havana Brown - joint deal with Island Records Australia
- Ericka Guitron
- Midnight Red
- Priyanka Chopra - joint deal with Interscope Records and DesiHits.
- Sabrina Claudio
- Talkback - joint deal with Cash Money Records.
- Zander Bleck - joint deal with Interscope Records.

Other names previously with label include Jennifer Lopez, Mohombi, Porcelain Black, Dive Bella Dive KMC

RedOne is the main producer and the founder of 2101 Records. He cooperates with the songwriters Bilal "The Chef" Hajji, Achraf Jannusi, Giorgio Tuinfort Astrid Roelants, Geraldo Jacop Sandell, Arjang Shishegar, and Jimmy Paul Thornfeldt.

=== RedOne Records ===
A number of new artists were signed to the new rebranded label RedOne Records. Some earlier artists from 2101 Records are listed with the new setup.

- John Mamann
- Chawki
- Midnight Red
- Porcelain Black
- Kika
- Sophia Del Carmen
- Wayne Beckford

Affiliated with RedOne Records is the events productions entity SuperMartXé

== See also ==
- List of record labels
