= Midnight Red =

American boy band

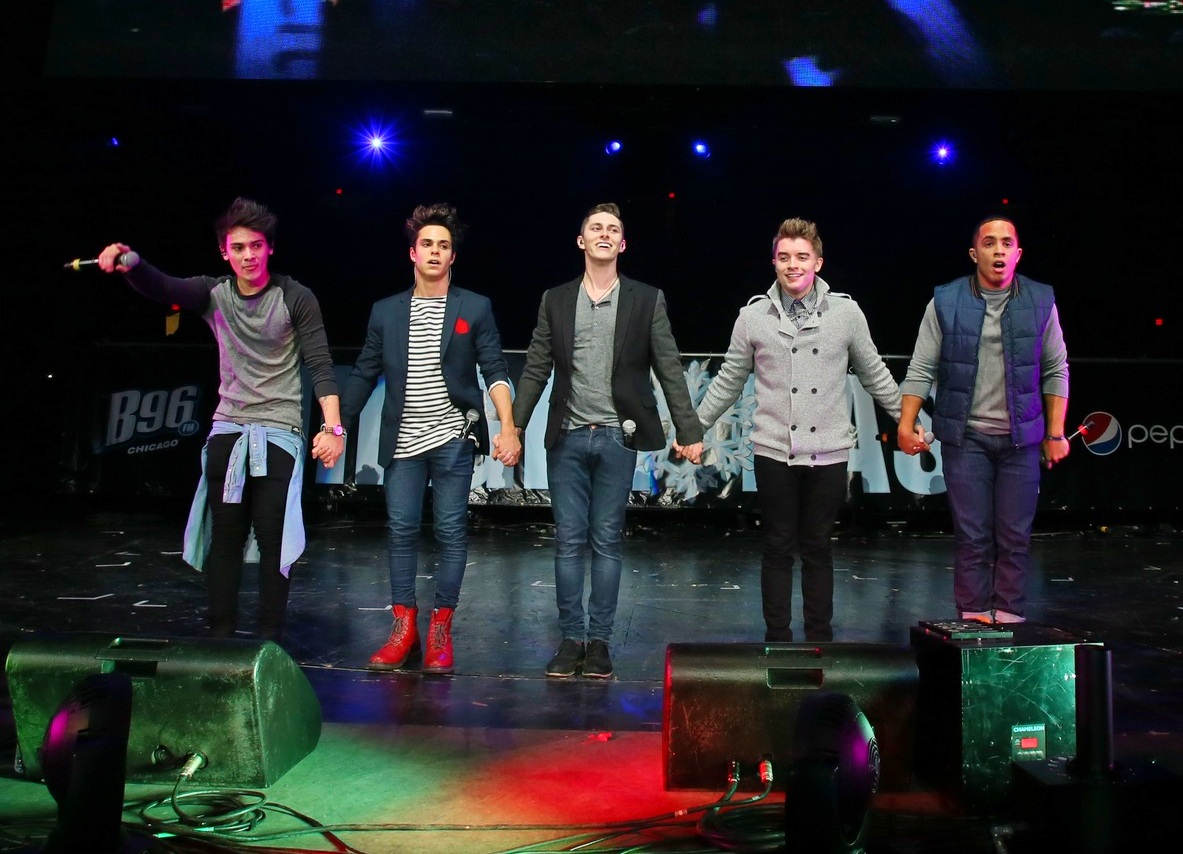

Background information
- Also known as: FLYTE
- Genres: Eurodance, Pop
- Years active: 2009–present
- Labels: 2101, Capitol
- Members: Eric Secharia; Anthony Ladao; Thomas Augusto; Colton Rudloff
- Past members: Joey Diggs Jr.
- Website: midnightred.com

Midnight Red (formerly known as FLYTE) is an American boy band formed in 2009. The group was signed to RedOne's 2101 Records and to Capitol.

== Career ==
=== 2009–12: Formation and beginning ===
Midnight Red was originally formed by Eric Secharia, Anthony Ladao, and Thomas Augusto. Secharia and Augusto auditioned for the 2007 rebirth of popular boy band Menudo. The group recruited Joey Diggs Jr. from a referral by a fellow producer, while Colton Rudloff was found on YouTube. In 2009, after relocating to California, the group formed FLYTE.

The group caught the eye of one of the music producers of RedOne, who worked with Akon, Lady Gaga, Pitbull, and Jennifer Lopez, among other artists. Once signed to Interscope Records, the group renamed itself Midnight Red. In the video for "Body Talk", Augusto says "Midnight is that time that everyone wants to sneak out and party, and red is a very dominant, 'in your face' color and it represents what Midnight Red wants to do with its music." Red is also part of their name, in honor of REDone.

In the spring of 2011, Interscope released Midnight Red's self-titled EP on iTunes. The EP featured their first song "One Club at a Time", which was used for FOX's So You Think You Can Dance for National Dance Day, as well as a cover of "Step by Step" by New Kids on the Block.

The group received rave reviews as the opening act on the NKOTBSB Tour in the summer of 2011. After the tour the group flew to Paris in December 2011 to continue recording material for their debut album. The group performed for many events including Larry King's "Guard a Heart" Pre Grammy Performance, opening for Carly Rae Jepsen at Universal City Walk, and Young Hollywood-Uneeqability. Their first official single, "Hell Yeah", has received airplay on Minnesota's Mix 94.9 KMXK FM and was released for radio in the latter half of May 2012. The video for the single was shot in April 2012 in California and was directed by Declan Whitebloom, who has worked with artists like Taylor Swift and One Direction."Hell Yeah" was released to iTunes on June 19, 2012.

=== 2013–present: Midnight Red ===
Midnight Red released their single "Take Me Home" on July 16, 2013. The video was released on August 19, 2013. The single was produced by RedOne and recorded in Los Angeles, CA. "Take Me Home" was also featured in a Coca-Cola commercial that ran in movie theaters nationwide. Midnight Red signed to Capitol Records in June 2013 through a joint venture with 2101 Records. They released their debut self-titled EP on December 10, 2013. To promote their single, Midnight Red performed in a number of holiday shows in the United States, following a successful radio tour. In 2014, the band was chosen as Elvis Duran's Artist of the Month and appeared on NBC's Today show with Hoda Kotb and Kathy Lee Gifford performing "Take Me Home". As the band calls their fans "redheads", the hosts Hoda and Kathy Lee were shown wearing red wigs while the band performed an acoustic version of the song live. Also in 2014, Midnight Red toured with Austin Mahone on MTV's Artist to Watch Tour. This tour consisted of stops across the eastern United States in 10 cities and other acts included Becky G and W3 The Future.

On March 27, 2015, Joey Diggs announced his departure from the group, citing that "happiness" and "trust" come first for him in order to "see growth" that he desires to see in his life.

== Members ==
=== Current ===
- Colton Rudloff, born 17 January 1989 in Buffalo, New York. Colton was discovered through YouTube by his fellow band members. Prior to his participation in Midnight Red, he auditioned for the fifth season of American Idol at 16 but was turned down because of his young age. Rudloff is also a level 10 gymnast.
- Thomas Augusto, born 3 May 1991 in Arlington, Texas. Thomas relocated from his home state of Texas to California after being reached out to by Eric and Anthony to join the group. Thomas auditioned for MTV's Making Menudo back in 2007.
- Eric Secharia, born 21 January 1992 in Burbank, California. Eric founded the group with Anthony, whom he was friends with through a mutual voice coach. Eric auditioned for MTV's Making Menudo, where he first met Thomas, in 2007.
- Anthony Ladao, born 11 February 1993 in Seattle, Washington. Anthony was one of the first members of the group along with Eric, whom he was friends with because of a mutual vocal coach. Anthony auditioned to be a backup dancer for Janet Jackson at the age 12, but was turned down after making it to the final round because he was too young to go on tour.

=== Former ===
- Joey Diggs Jr., born 26 August 1989 in Los Angeles, California. Joey, who had been attending California State University, was tapped by Midnight Red's manager at the time. His father, Joey Diggs Sr., was a singer/songwriter that had recorded vocals with famous musicians such as Smokey Robinson and Whitney Houston.

== Discography ==
=== Extended plays ===
List of studio albums, with selected chart positions and certifications
Title	Details	Peak chart positions	Notes
Title	Details	US Heat.	Notes
Midnight Red	Released: December 10, 2013; Format: Digital download; Label: 2101, Capitol	17	Track listing: 1. "Take Me Home" – 3:33; 2. "Take Me Home" (Wildboyz Club Mix) – 4:57; 3. "Miss Firestarter" – 3:40; 4. "Where Did U Go?" – 3:10; 5. "Nothing Lasts Forever" – 4:10
"—" denotes releases that did not chart or were not released in that territory.

=== Singles ===
List of singles, with selected chart positions and certifications
Title	Year	Peak chart positions		Album
Title	Year	US Dance	SPA	Album
"One Club at a Time"	2011	4	—	—
"Hell Yeah"	2012	—	—	—
"Take Me Home"	2013	—	3	Midnight Red
"Contigo"	2014	—	28	—
"Where Did U Go?"	2014	—	2	Midnight Red
"—" denotes releases that did not chart or were not released in that territory.

== Tours ==
Opening act

- NKOTBSB Tour (Backstreet Boys and New Kids on the Block) (2011)
- Word of Mouth Tour (The Wanted) (2014) (select U.S. & Canada dates)
- MTV's Artist to Watch Tour (Austin Mahone) (2014)
