= La Guerra de los Chistes =

- Starring: Radames of Jesus; Juan Carlos Casasola; Juan Carlos "El Borrego" Nava; La Wanders Lover
- Country of origin: Mexico
- No. of episodes: 163

Production
- Production locations: Telehit Studios; Mexico City, Federal District
- Running time: Approximately 52 min.

Original release
- Network: Telehit
- Release: May 8, 2008 – present

Guerra de Chistes (Joke Wars) is a television show from the Mexican TV network Telehit hosted by Radames de Jesus, Juan Carlos Casasola, Juan Carlos El Borrego Nava and La Wanders Lover, they tell jokes throughout the program and have special guests on every show.

== Guests ==
Full episodes with their respective guests
