= Bed and Breakfast (album) =

Bed & Breakfast

Studio album by Spookey Ruben
- Released: 2001, 2006
- Recorded: 1997–2001
- Genre: Indie rock
- Labels: Hi-hat Recordings, Zomba
- Producer: Spookey Ruben

Spookey Ruben chronology
Brunch (2000)	Bed & Breakfast (2001)	Ausfahrt Walsrode (2006)

Bed & Breakfast are two albums released by Spookey Ruben. Originally released as singular albums in 2001 and 2002, they were re-packaged to a two cd set for worldwide release in 2006. In 1997, Spookey delivered tapes of what was then two EP-length releases, Bed and Breakfast. TVT wasn't too keen on what they heard, and grew increasingly nervous about the concept behind the double release. He returned to work on more demos, while his frustration grew, and this turned out to be the truncated version of these two albums, Modes of Transportation Vol. 2: What's a Boy to do?. Music videos were released for, "Brand New Game", "Glenn, Take Care", "Sex Traffic" and "Shauna". They are available on his Myspace.

Describing the albums in 2001 to Exclaim Magazine, Spookey states: "Bed is the slower songs, Breakfast is the fast songs," he begins. "Bed is red and Breakfast is green, like stop and go. Breakfast has this '80s digital watch [on its back cover] and Bed has the old cuckoo clock. The production is kinda like that Bed is more towards the '70s and Breakfast leans into the '80s. Breakfast is the short and sweet poppy songs, Bed is deeper, the lyrics are heavier and the songs are slower. [For inside booklets] Breakfast is cartoons and Bed is this heavy dictionary. Bed should be listened to completely in the dark. For ideal listening pleasure, Breakfast ought to be dubbed to a cassette on an original Sony Walkman and you should be on a treadmill with your leg warmers on." Each track relates to a time period between 1:00am - 23:00pm

== Bed ==
1. Good Night, Sleep Tight
2. When You Fall In Love with Someone Who's in Love with Someone Else
3. Favourite Movie
4. Kubla Khan
5. Glenn, Take Care
6. Trick Boy Wonder
7. Hey Now, Behave Now
8. Deja Vu
9. 9am: Who's Got the Inside Scoop On You?
10. Roncesvalles
11. Memory / Lazy
12. N.Kinski

== Breakfast ==
1. Wakey wakey
2. The Office
3. Over And Out
4. Brand New Game
5. Shauna
6. Sex Traffic
7. My Female Friends
8. Born on Labor Day
9. Suddenly The Sun
10. Public Puberty
11. Overhills
12. Why Did I Do What I Did?

== Production ==
- Written, Produced, and all instruments - Spookey Ruben
- Co-producer - Glen Salley
- Computer (Cubase, Mac) - Malcolm Sweeney
- Drums - Stephan Szczesniak (tracks: 2, 4, 9)
- Engineer – Glen Salley (tracks: 2, 3, 8, 9)
- Mastered by - Darius Szczepaniak
- Mixed by - Michael Jack (tracks: 2, 5, 9, 10)
- Digital Audio Support - Chris Simon
- Other Illustrations - Bulent Akman, Chris Lee (3)
- Photography – Stephen Chung
- Recorded by - Spookey Ruben (tracks: 1, 4 to 7, 10 to 12)
- Recorded By, Mixed by - Ben Eisen (tracks: 6, 7, 11, 12)

== Reviews ==
Professional ratings
Review scores
Source	Rating
Autopia	(favorable)
NOW magazine	3/5 stars

The music blog Autopia states: Somewhere between the musical stylings of Human League, Islands and Kennedy lies Spookey Ruben. It's like indie music for kids but still directed towards adults. The songs are whimsical, bright, and bouncy with a dash of electro-prog thrown in.
