= Egoísta =

Single by Belinda featuring Pitbull

from the album Carpe Diem
- Released: February 23, 2010
- Recorded: 2009
- Genre: Electropop; dance-pop
- Length: 3:24
- Label: Capitol Latin
- Songwriters: Belinda Peregrín; Armando Pérez; Nacho Peregrín; Jimmy Harry; Jessie Malakouti (English version only)
- Producer: Jimmy Harry

Belinda singles chronology
"Sal De Mi Piel" (2009)	"Egoísta" (2010)	"Dopamina" (2011)

Pitbull singles chronology
"Fresh Out the Oven" (2009)	"Egoísta" (2010)	"Armada Latina" (2010)

Music video
- "Egoísta" on YouTube

Audio
- "Egoísta" on YouTube

Music video
- "Egoísta (English Version)" on YouTube

Audio
- "Egoísta (English Version)" on YouTube

"Egoísta" (English: "Selfish") is a song by Spanish singer-songwriter and actress Belinda, released as the lead single from album Carpe Diem on February 8, 2010 to radio stations, and digitally on February 23, 2010. The song features American rapper Pitbull. The song was originally recorded in Spanish, but later was re-released in English as well. Also a music video was filmed for this version.

== Song information ==
In late 2009, Belinda confirmed that she would be recording a song with rapper Pitbull for her then upcoming album. In November of that year, the song "Culpable" was announced to be the first single of Belinda's album Carpe Diem. But it was later confirmed through Belinda's Twitter account that the album and single release would be delayed to 2010 after finishing Camaleones, and that "Egoísta" would instead be selected as the first single. An English version of the song was recorded on March 18, 2010 with Pitbull in Los Angeles. This version was not included on the album and was released in June 2010. On Radio Disney Latin America, certain lyrics including "morfina" ("morphine") and "maldito cromagñon" ("damn cro-magnon") were censored, especially the latter one since it strongly referenced the tragedy of the República Cromañón nightclub fire.

"Egoísta" debuted at number #17 on the Venezuelan Latin Singles Chart, making it her highest debut ever on the chart. The song also debuted on the Billboard Hot Latin Songs at number 45, on the Latin Pop Songs the song debuted at number 34, on the Latin Tropical Songs at number 29 and finally on the Latin Rhythm Songs at number 17, making it her first top 20 on the chart.

== Live performances ==
Belinda sang the song along with Pitbull for the first time on the television show El Show de Cristina on April 26, 2010. Both artists were lip-syncing. This became noticeable when Pitbull made some slight mistakes, first when his verse unexpectedly started playing and he wasn't singing along to the song, and also when Pitbull started singing into his microphone with Belinda in the Egoísta chorus, which Belinda sings alone. Both Belinda and Pitbull teamed up once again to sing their hit song at the annual Premios Juventud 2010. This time both were singing.

== Music video ==
Belinda in the music video for "Egoísta".

A part of the music video was shot in Miami along with Pitbull in late March 2010. In May 2010 she filmed the second and final part of the video, in which she wore four different outfits, including a white dress with black bands and a big pink bow in her head, like on the Carpe Diem album cover, at the request of the public. She is the director of the video along with Vance Burberry. The video was produced by Belinda and Nacho Peregrín.

The video is set in a Gothic setting with the scenery of a castle and elements of black, pink and red, and the company of dancers and two dogs. The music video was released in English and Spanish version, since the recording is being done simultaneously with the collaboration of photography director Vance Burberry, who has worked with artists such as Madonna, Britney Spears, Marilyn Manson and Santana.

The script was co-written by Belinda, Daniel Shain, and Nacho Peregrín. The music video was released on June 21 on her official YouTube account and released on June 22 in MTV Latin America and others music video channels.

== Chart performance ==
Chart (2010)	Peak position
Mexico (Monitor Latino)	6
US Hot Latin Songs (Billboard)	28
US Latin Pop Airplay (Billboard)	18
US Tropical Songs (Billboard)	29
US Latin Rhythm Airplay (Billboard)	9
US Latin Digital Songs (Billboard)	17
US Latin Pop Digital Songs (Billboard)	12
Venezuela (Record Report)	16

== Release history ==
Region	Date	Format	Label
Worldwide	February 8, 2010	Radio premiere	Capitol Latin
Worldwide	February 23, 2010	Digital download	Capitol Latin
Worldwide	June 29, 2010	Digital download (English version)	Capitol Latin

== Cover versions ==
- In June 2010, Georgian singer Tamta performed a Greek version of the song with Isaias Matiamba at the 2010 MAD Video Music Awards and subsequently released the song as a part of a rerelease of her 2010 album Tharros I Alitheia.
