= Camaleones =

Mexican telenovela

- Genre: Telenovela
- Story by: Gustavo Barrios; Diana Segovia
- Directed by: Alejandro Álvarez; Daniel Ferrer; Felipe Nájera; José Ángel García
- Creative director: Florencio Zavala
- Starring: Edith González; Belinda; Guillermo García Cantú; Alfonso Herrera
- Opening theme: "Sal De Mi Piel" performed by Belinda Peregrín
- Country of origin: Mexico
- Original language: Spanish
- No. of episodes: 135

Production
- Executive producer: Rosy Ocampo
- Producers: María Alba Espinosa; Eduardo Meza
- Production locations: Mexico City, Mexico
- Editor: Alfredo Juárez
- Camera setup: Multi-camera
- Production company: Televisa

Original release
- Network: Canal de las Estrellas
- Release: July 27, 2009 – January 29, 2010

Camaleones (Chameleons) is a 2009 Mexican telenovela produced by Rosy Ocampo for Televisa. The telenovela aired on Canal de las Estrellas from July 27, 2009 to January 29, 2010. It stars Belinda, Alfonso Herrera, Edith González and Guillermo García Cantú.

Filming took place in Mexico City and Xochitepec in June 2009, and lasted approximately 7 months.

== Plot ==
Camaleones is the story of Valentina and Sebastián, who are both skilled thieves. They are united when a man they call "El Amo" forces them to commit crimes in order to protect their loved ones, who are in jail. El Amo wants to outwit Augusto Ponce de León, a corrupt police chief who is in charge of the "Chameleon" case, which he has to solve if he wants to reach a position in politics and gain more and more power. Valentina and Sebastián pose as prefect and art history teacher, respectively, at San Bartolomé School, where Augusto and Francisca, his wife, are the directors and owners; it is there where their daughter Solange studies.

The school's gardener, Leónidas, is an undercover policeman who plans to put Augusto in jail for his crimes and the death of his son, since Augusto threw him off a building and made everyone believe that he had committed suicide. Leónidas develops friendships with Valentina, Sebastian, Solange and Ulises, and from the basement of the school he is planning revenge against Augusto for pretending to be something he is not. Ironically, all the main characters pretend to be someone else, hence the name Chameleons.

== Cast ==
=== Main ===
- Edith González as Francisca Campos
- Belinda as Valentina Izaguirre
- Guillermo García Cantú as Augusto Ponce
- Alfonso Herrera as Sebastián Jaramillo
- Manuel 'Flaco' Ibáñez as Leónidas
- Ana Bertha Espín as Lupita Morán
- Sherlyn as Solange Ponce de León
- Pee Wee as Ulises Morán
- José Elías Moreno as Armando Jaramillo
- Luis Manuel Ávila as Eusebio Portillo
- José Luis Reséndez as Pedro Recalde
- Mariana Ávila as Carmen Castillo
- Marisol Santacruz as Magdalena Orozco
- Ferdinando Valencia as Patricio Calderón
- Flor Rubio as Irene
- Alberich Bormann as Féderico Díaz Ballesteros
- Carla Cardona as Mercedes Márquez
- Erik Díaz as Lucio Barragán
- Juan Carlos Flores as Bruno Pintos Castro
- Lucía Zerecero as Rocío Santoscoy
- Mariluz Bermúdez as Lorena González
- Michelle Renaud as Betina Montenegro
- Paul Stanley as Rolando Rincón
- Taide as Cristina Hernández
- Ricardo de Pascual as Conrado Tapia
- Erik Guecha as Gerardo Zúñiga
- Lilibeth as Sabrina
- Eduardo Liñán as Víttorio Barragán
- Esteban Franco as Señor Pintos
- Ginny Hoffman as Gabriela
- Jessica Salazar as Catalina de Saavedra
- Jorge Alberto Bolaños as Vincente Villoro
- Mónica Dossetti as Señora de Díaz
- Queta Lavat as Graciela
- Rafael del Villar as Efraín Castillo / Señor Montenegro
- Ricardo Vera as Efraín Castillo
- Renée Varsi as Norma de Pintos

=== Guest starts ===
- Roberto Blandón as Javier Saavedra
- Karla Álvarez as Ágata Menéndez
- Roberto Ballesteros as Ricardo Calderón
- Amairani as Señora de Rincón
- Anaís as Evangelina de Márquez
- Eduardo Cáceres as José Ignacio Márquez
- Grettell Valdez as Silvana

== Music ==
Camaleones: Música de l a Telenovela

Studio album / Soundtrack by Camaleones
- Released: November 24, 2009 (Mexico); July 13, 2010 (United States)
- Recorded: 2009
- Genre: Latin pop
- Length: 34:54
- Label: EMI
- Producers: Rosy Ocampo, Áureo Baqueiro

Singles from Camaleones: Música de la Telenovela
- 1. "Sal de Mi Piel" Released: August 17, 2009; 2. "No Quiero Verte" Released: November 2009; 3. "Por Favor Quiéreme" Released: December 2009

Camaleones: Música de la Telenovela is the soundtrack album for the Mexican telenovela Camaleones and the debut studio album by Camaleones. It was released in Mexico on November 24, 2009.

=== Track listing ===
No.	Title	Writer(s)	Performer(s)	Length
1.	"Sal de Mi Piel"	Belinda Peregrín	Belinda	3:26
2.	"Por Favor Quiéreme"	Javier Calderón, Ruffo Ibarra Arellano	Pee Wee and Sherlyn	2:49
3.	"Por Unas Palabras"	José Alberto Inzunza Favela, Roxana Puente	Camaleones	3:12
4.	"No Quiero Verte"	Javier Calderón, Eduardo Meza Rodríguez, Carlos Romo Bautista	Camaleones	3:43
5.	"Puedo Hacerte Feliz"	Javier Calderón, Eduardo Meza Rodríguez	Camaleones	3:55
6.	"Rompecabezas"	Dany Tomás, Irvin Salinas, Servando Primera	Pee Wee	3:25
7.	"Una Hermosa Historia"	Di Pietro Rodríguez, Felice Orlando	Camaleones	3:36
8.	"Se Acabó"	María Bernal, Javier Calderón, Eduardo Meza	Camaleones	3:42
9.	"Camaleones"	Francisco Saldaña, Irvin Salinas, Norgie Noriega, Richard Bull, Víctor Delgado	Pee Wee	4:17
10.	"Sólo Tú, Sólo Yo"	Javier Calderón, Eduardo Meza Rodríguez, Christian Hugo Petersen Pérez	Camaleones	2:49

== Released on DVD ==
As they released a CD with the songs of the telenovela, the May 14, 2010 was released a DVD.

== Awards and nominations ==
Year	Award	Category	Nominated	Result	Ref.
2010	28th TVyNovelas Awards	Best Male Revelation	Pee Wee	Nominated	
2010	Kids' Choice Awards Mexico	Favorite Male Character in a Series	Alfonso Herrera	Nominated	
2010	Kids' Choice Awards Mexico	Favorite Male Character in a Series	Pee Wee	Nominated	
2010	Kids' Choice Awards Mexico	Favorite Female Character in a Series	Belinda	Nominated	
2010	Kids' Choice Awards Mexico	Favorite Villain	Manuel "Flaco" Ibáñez	Nominated	
2010	Premios People en Español	Best Young Actress	Belinda	Nominated	
2010	Premios People en Español	Best Young Actor	Alfonso Herrera	Nominated	
2010	Premios People en Español	Best Couple	Belinda & Alfonso Herrera	Nominated	
2011	Premios Juventud	Girl of My Dream	Belinda	Nominated	
2011	Premios Juventud	He's So Hot!	Alfonso Herrera	Nominated	
