= Way Back Home: Live at New York City =

Way Back Home: Live from New York City

Live album by The Wreckers
- Released: December 4, 2007 (US)
- Genre: Country
- Length: 44:04
- Label: Maverick
- Producer: Ned Doyle

The Wreckers chronology
Stand Still, Look Pretty (2006)	Way Back Home: Live from New York City (2007)

Professional ratings
Review scores
Source	Rating
Allmusic	3/5 stars

Way Back Home: Live from New York City is a live album by The Wreckers. It is their second release and it was released on December 4, 2007, by Warner Bros. Records. The release also features a DVD capturing the live concert. This album consists mostly of live renditions of the hits which appear on their debut album, Stand Still, Look Pretty, as well as two new songs ("Damn That Radio" and "Different Truck, Same Loser") and a cover of a Michelle Branch original, "Love Me Like That". This album was the duo's final release, before they separated to focus on solo careers.

== Track listing ==
No.	Title	Writer(s)	Length
1.	"The Good Kind"	Michelle Branch, Jessica Harp	4:16
2.	"Love Me Like That"	Branch, John Shanks	4:27
3.	"Way Back Home"	Branch, Harp	4:28
4.	"Damn That Radio"	Gretchen Wilson, Jason Deere	3:32
5.	"Crazy People"	Branch, Harp	3:56
6.	"Cigarettes"	Harp	3:22
7.	"My, Oh My"	Branch, Harp, Wayne Kirkpatrick, Josh Leo	3:44
8.	"Different Truck, Same Loser"	James Timothy Nichols, Connie Ray Harrington	3:23
9.	"Tennessee"	Harp	6:32
10.	"Lay Me Down"	Branch, Harp, Greg Wells	5:31
11.	"Leave the Pieces"	Billy Austin, Jennifer Hanson	5:40
12.	"Stand Still, Look Pretty"	Branch, Harp	2:51
13.	"Rain"	Branch	4:58
