= Tutto =

Tutto can refer to:

Music

- Tutto Live, album by Gianna Nannini
- Tutto è possibile (Finley album), 2006 debut album studio by Finley
  - "Tutto è possibile" (song), 2005 song by Finley
- Tutto Tony Tammaro, greatest hits album by Neapolitan parody singer-songwriter Tony Tammaro
- Tutto Fabrizio De André, first album released by Fabrizio De André

Film

- Tutto l'amore che c'è, 2000 film by Italian director Sergio Rubini
- Tutto il mondo ride, a 1952 Italian film

Other

- Tutto, an Italian brand of paper towels owned by Georgia-Pacific

== See also ==
- Tutti
- Tutta
