= Utopía (Belinda Peregrín album) =

Studio album by Belinda
- Released: October 3, 2006
- Recorded: March–August 2006
- Genres: Pop rock; rock; pop; Latin pop
- Length: 47:14; 65:17 (Utopía 2)
- Languages: Spanish; English
- Label: EMI Televisa
- Producers: Belinda (exec.); Greg Wells; Greg Kurstin; Kara DioGuardi; Mitch Allan; Jimmy Harry; Lester Mendez; Armando Ávila; Matthew Gerrard

Belinda chronology
Total (2006)	Utopía (2006)	Carpe Diem (2010)

Alternative cover
- Brazilian, European and Italian cover.

Alternative cover
- Utopía² cover.

Singles from Utopía
- 1. "Ni Freud Ni Tu Mamá" Released: September 19, 2006; 2. "Bella Traición" Released: January 26, 2007; 3. "Luz Sin Gravedad" Released: May 29, 2007; 4. "If We Were" Released: August 28, 2007; 5. "Alguien Más" Released: September 2007; 6. "Es De Verdad" Released: October 1, 2007; 7. "See A Little Light" Released: March 21, 2008

Utopía is the second studio album by Spanish-Mexican singer-songwriter Belinda. It was released on October 3, 2006 by EMI Televisa Music in Mexico and Latin America. The album was later released on September 17, 2007 to Europe and the United States. Recording sessions for the album took place during March to August 2006 at several recording studios, and production was handled primarily by Greg Wells, Greg Kurstin, Mitch Allan, Jimmy Harry and Lester Mendez. As of June 2008, the album had sold one million copies worldwide.

== Background ==
Utopía marks Belinda's first album with EMI after leaving Sony BMG for creative differences in the Spring of 2006. Belinda is credited as executive producer for the record and recorded the album between March and July 2006 in Miami, Los Angeles, and New York City. The record contains darker tones and is described as a more mature album for its lyrics and ballads, in contrast to Belinda, her debut. Inspiration was garnered from books including Thomas Moore's own Utopia. Belinda appeared on Disney's Channel's The Cheetah Girls 2 and contributed to the TV movie soundtrack, which let to her label EMI wanting a re-release in English; she spend one week in Los Angeles recording Utopía 2, a CD/DVD released to Europe and North America by EMI International on September 25, 2007. Belinda made appearances on "Bailando por un Sueño", "Bailando por la Boda de Tus Sueños" and Buscando Timbiriche la nueva banda in order to promote the record.

Upon its release, Utopía received generally positive reviews from most music critics which noted a more mature sound and earned Belinda a Latin Grammy nominations for Best Female Pop Vocal Album and Song of the Year. It was re-released as Utopía² on September 25, 2007.

== Awards ==
On August 29, 2007, Belinda received a Latin Grammy nomination for Best Female Pop Vocal Album for her work in Utopía, and also the second single "Bella Traición" was nominated for Song of the Year. At the MTV Video Music Awards Latin America 2008, which were held in Mexico City, she also won two awards: Best Solo Artist and Video of the Year for her hit single Bella Traición. She won Best Female Pop Artist on the 20th edition of Premios Lo Nuestro beating fellow singers Julieta Venegas, Paulina Rubio and Yuridia.

== Tour ==
Tour Utopía
- Tour by Belinda
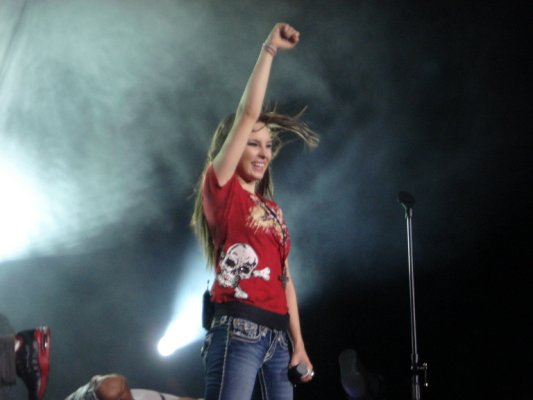
- Belinda at Auditorio Coca-Cola
- Location: North America; South America
- Associated album: Utopía
- Start date: July 12, 2007
- End date: March 11, 2008
- Legs: 2
- No. of shows: 44 (1 cancelled)

Belinda concert chronology
- Tour Fiesta en la Azotea (2004–05); Tour Utopía (2007–08); Catarsis Tour (2014–15)

Tour Utopía was Belinda's second concert tour, and her first world tour.

== Track listing ==
No.	Title	Writer(s)	Producer(s)	Length
1.	"Utopía"	Belinda; Nacho Peregrín; Greg Kurstin; Sia Furler	Kurstin	3:00
2.	"Ni Freud Ni Tu Mamá"	Belinda; Nacho; Greg Wells; Shelly Peiken	Wells	3:24
3.	"See a Little Light"	Belinda; Nacho; Jimmy Harry	Harry	4:04
4.	"Bella Traición"	Belinda; Nacho; Kara DioGuardi; Mitch Allan	DioGuardi; Allan	3:45
5.	"Contigo o Sin Ti"	Belinda; Karen Juantorena; Daniel McKinney; Krista Gonzales; Kobe Eshun	McKinney	4:01
6.	"Alguien Más"	Belinda; Nacho; DioGuardi; Allan	Allan	3:13
7.	"¿Quién Es Feliz?"	Belinda; Nacho; Lester Mendez; Skye Sweetnam	Méndez	3:47
8.	"Pudo Ser Tan Fácil"	Belinda; Nacho; Robert Habolin	Wells	3:54
9.	"Noche Cool"	Belinda; Juantorena; DioGuardi; Nicole Scherzinger	Wells	3:06
10.	"Amiga Soledad"	Belinda; Nacho; Mendez; Kay Hanley	Méndez	4:24
11.	"Good... Good"	Belinda; Nacho; Juantorena; Kandi Burruss	Harry	3:23
12.	"Luz Sin Gravedad"	Belinda; Nacho; Harry	Harry	4:01
13.	"Never Enough"	Belinda; Nacho; Kurstin	Kurstin	3:12

=== Others versions ===
Utopía²

Utopía² is the special edition of this album. The reissue was released on September 25, 2007 in the US, Latin America and Europe in several versions. A song Spanish-language song ("Es De Verdad") only appears in the American version.

Utopía² bonus tracks
No.	Title	Writer(s)	Length
14.	"Takes One to Know One" (English version of "Pudo Ser Tan Fácil")	Robert Habolin; Marcus Sepehrmanesh	3:55
15.	"If We Were" (English version of "Ni Freud Ni Tu Mamá")	Greg Wells; Shelly Peiken	3:25
16.	"End of the Day" (English version of "Bella Traición")	Kara DioGuardi; Mitch Allan	3:45
17.	"Es De Verdad" (US only)	Diego G.; Karenka; Reyli	3:36
18.	"Why Wait?" (from The Cheetah Girls 2)	Matthew Gerrard; Robbie Nevil	3:01

Utopía² bonus DVD
No.	Title	Length
1.	"Ni Freud Ni Tu Mamá" (music video)
2.	"Bella Traición" (music video)
3.	"Luz Sin Gravedad" (music video)
4.	"EPK Utopía"
5.	"Making of Bella Traición"
6.	"Making of Luz Sin Gravedad"

Brazilian edition

The Brazilian special edition was released on November 12, 2007. It includes the songs "If We Were", "End of the Day", "Takes One to Know One" and "Why Wait?" (from The Cheetah Girls 2).

Track listing
No.	Title	Writer(s)	{{{extra_column}}}	Length
1.	"Utopía"	Belinda; Nacho Peregrín; Greg Kurstin; Sia Furler	Kurstin	3:00
2.	"If We Were"			3:24
3.	"See a Little Light"	Belinda; Nacho; Jimmy Harry	Harry	4:04
4.	"End of the Day"			3:45
5.	"Contigo o Sin Ti"	Belinda; Karen Juantorena; Daniel McKinney; Krista Gonzales; Kobe Eshun	McKinney	4:01
6.	"Alguien Más"	Belinda; Nacho; DioGuardi; Allan	Allan	3:13
7.	"¿Quién Es Feliz?"	Belinda; Nacho; Lester Mendez; Skye Sweetnam	Méndez	3:47
8.	"Takes One to Know One"			3:55
9.	"Noche Cool"	Belinda; Juantorena; DioGuardi; Nicole Scherzinger	Wells	3:06
10.	"Amiga Soledad"	Belinda; Nacho; Mendez; Kay Hanley	Méndez	4:24
11.	"Good... Good"	Belinda; Nacho; Juantorena; Kandi Burruss	Harry	3:23
12.	"Luz Sin Gravedad"	Belinda; Nacho; Harry	Harry	4:01
13.	"Never Enough"	Belinda; Nacho; Kurstin	Kurstin	3:12
14.	"Why Wait?"			3:01
15.	"Ni Freud Ni Tu Mamá"			3:24
16.	"Bella Traición"			3:45
17.	"Pudo Ser Tan Fácil"			3:54

European edition

- The European special edition includes the 13 songs from the original edition and the addition of "If We Were", "End of the Day", "Takes One to Know One" and "Why Wait?". This edition was released on November 19, 2007.

Track listing
No.	Title	Writer(s)	{{{extra_column}}}	Length
1.	"Utopía"	Belinda; Nacho Peregrín; Greg Kurstin; Sia Furler	Kurstin	3:00
2.	"Ni Freud Ni Tu Mamá"	Belinda; Nacho; Greg Wells; Shelly Peiken	Wells	3:24
3.	"See a Little Light"	Belinda; Nacho; Jimmy Harry	Harry	4:04
4.	"Bella Traición"	Belinda; Nacho; Kara DioGuardi; Mitch Allan	DioGuardi; Allan	3:45
5.	"Contigo o Sin Ti"	Belinda; Karen Juantorena; Daniel McKinney; Krista Gonzales; Kobe Eshun	McKinney	4:01
6.	"Alguien Más"	Belinda; Nacho; DioGuardi; Allan	Allan	3:13
7.	"¿Quién Es Feliz?"	Belinda; Nacho; Lester Mendez; Skye Sweetnam	Méndez	3:47
8.	"Pudo Ser Tan Fácil"	Belinda; Nacho; Robert Habolin	Wells	3:54
9.	"Noche Cool"	Belinda; Juantorena; DioGuardi; Nicole Scherzinger	Wells	3:06
10.	"Amiga Soledad"	Belinda; Nacho; Mendez; Kay Hanley	Méndez	4:24
11.	"Good... Good"	Belinda; Nacho; Juantorena; Kandi Burruss	Harry	3:23
12.	"Luz Sin Gravedad"	Belinda; Nacho; Harry	Harry	4:01
13.	"Never Enough"	Belinda; Nacho; Kurstin	Kurstin	3:12
14.	"If We Were"			3:24
15.	"End of the Day"			3:45
16.	"Takes One to Know One"			3:55
17.	"Why Wait?"			3:01

Italian edition

The Italian special edition includes the songs "If We Were", "End of the Day", "Takes One to Know One" instead of the Spanish versions, plus the songs "Why Wait?" and "Your Hero" (featuring Finley). The material was released on February 29, 2008.

Track listing
No.	Title	Writer(s)	{{{extra_column}}}	Length
1.	"Utopía"	Belinda; Nacho Peregrín; Greg Kurstin; Sia Furler	Kurstin	3:00
2.	"If We Were"			3:24
3.	"See a Little Light"	Belinda; Nacho; Jimmy Harry	Harry	4:04
4.	"End of the Day"			3:45
5.	"Contigo o Sin Ti"	Belinda; Karen Juantorena; Daniel McKinney; Krista Gonzales; Kobe Eshun	McKinney	4:01
6.	"Alguien Más"	Belinda; Nacho; DioGuardi; Allan	Allan	3:13
7.	"¿Quién Es Feliz?"	Belinda; Nacho; Lester Mendez; Skye Sweetnam	Méndez	3:47
8.	"Takes One to Know One"			3:55
9.	"Noche Cool"	Belinda; Juantorena; DioGuardi; Nicole Scherzinger	Wells	3:06
10.	"Amiga Soledad"	Belinda; Nacho; Mendez; Kay Hanley	Méndez	4:24
11.	"Good... Good"	Belinda; Nacho; Juantorena; Kandi Burruss	Harry	3:23
12.	"Luz Sin Gravedad"	Belinda; Nacho; Harry	Harry	4:01
13.	"Never Enough"	Belinda; Nacho; Kurstin	Kurstin	3:12
14.	"Why Wait?"			3:01
15.	"Your Hero" (featuring Finley)			4:02

Notes

- "Utopía" is a Spanish version of an unreleased Sia song, entitled "The Corner".
- "Noche Cool" (Cool Night) is the Spanish version of the Pussycat Dolls song "Flirt", co-written by Kara DioGuardi and Nicole Scherzinger.
- "Contigo o Sin Ti" (With or Without You) is a re-working of Esthero's song, "If Tha Mood", from her album Wikked Lil' Grrrls.
- "¿Quién Es Feliz?" (Who Is Happy?) is a Spanish version of an unreleased Skye Sweetnam song, entitled "Remember Me".

== Singles ==
- "Ni Freud Ni Tu Mamá" was released as the lead single in Mexico and Latin America on September 19, 2006 and peaked number one in Mexico. It was later released internationally on August 28, 2007 as If We Were for U.S. markets. Both versions of music video were shot by Scott Speer.
- "Bella Traición" was the second single and peaked number seven in the Mexican airplay chart. The music video was filmed in Mexico and was released on March 5.
- "Luz Sin Gravedad" was released as the third single of the album. It peaked on the top ten spots in numerous countries, including Argentina, Peru and Chile. An English version was released as the seventh and last single from the album, released in Europe, both versions with a music video.
- "Alguien Más" was the fourth single and had minor success. A music video was planned but for unknown reasons it was cancelled.
- "Es De Verdad" was the fifth single, released in Europe and released as a promo single in Mexico.

== EPs ==
Months after the original album was released, EMI released different EP's, Utopía 2 EP, remixes of "Ni Freud Ni Tu Mamá", "Bella Traición", "Luz Sin Gravedad", and the English versions. The EPs were released between 2006 and 2007.

== Credits and personnel ==
- Belinda: vocals.
- Greg Wells: guitar, drums, programming.
- Jimmy Harry: guitar, programming.
- John Allen: drums.
- James Rudder: Assistant engineer.

== Chart performance and certifications ==
The album debuted on the Billboard Top Latin Albums at number 20, also debuted at number eight on the Latin Pop Albums and number 19 on the Top Heatseekers Albums. On the Mexican Albums Chart, the album debuted at number three.

According to the Billboard magazine, as of January 2010, the album had sold over 79,000 copies in the United States, but her label EMI had not paid the gold certification by RIAA.

=== Charts ===
Chart (2006–2007)	Peak position
U.S. Billboard Top Latin Albums	20
U.S. Billboard Latin Pop Albums	8
U.S. Billboard Top Heatseekers	19
U.S. Billboard Top Heatseekers (South Atlantic)	3
U.S. Billboard Top Heatseekers (South Central)	9
México Top 100 Albums Chart	3
Spanish Top 100 Albums Chart	20
Year-end chart (2006–2007)	Peak position
México Top 100 Annual Albums 2006	43
México Top 100 Annual Albums 2007	30
Utopía 2 – Chart (2008)	Peak position
Italian Top 100 Albums Chart	43

=== Sales and certifications ===
Region	Certification	Certified units/sales
Argentina (CAPIF)	Platinum	20,000
Brazil	—	20,000
Chile	Gold	5,000
Colombia (ASINCOL)	Gold	10,000
Ecuador	Platinum	6,000
Mexico (AMPROFON)	Platinum	150,000
United States	—	79,000
Venezuela (APFV)	Platinum	20,000
Summaries
Worldwide	—	1,000,000
