= Tutto è possibile =

Tutto è possibile may refer to:

- Tutto è possibile (Finley album), 2006
  - "Tutto è possibile" (song), 2005
- Tutto è possibile (Geolier album), 2026
