= The Wreckers =

American country duo (2005–2007)

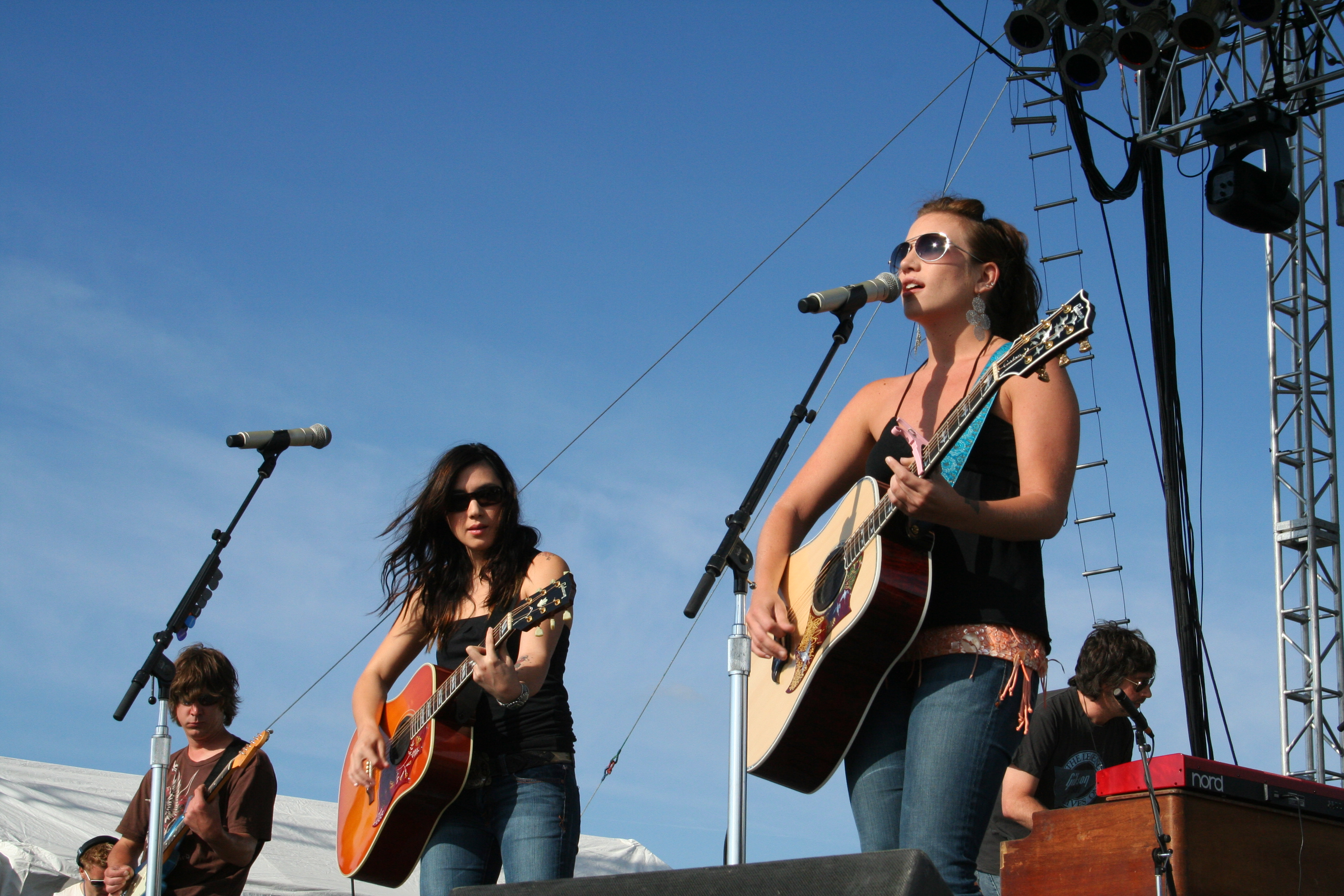
- The Wreckers (Michelle Branch at center, Jessica Harp at right) performing in June 2007

Background information
- Origin: United States
- Genre: Country
- Years active: 2005–2007
- Label: Maverick/Warner Bros. Nashville
- Past members: Michelle Branch; Jessica Harp

The Wreckers were an American country music duo formed in 2005 by Michelle Branch and Jessica Harp, both of whom had solo recordings before the duo's foundation. In 2006, the duo released its debut album Stand Still, Look Pretty, which produced a number one single on the Billboard Hot Country Songs in its lead-off single "Leave the Pieces". The album accounted for a top 10 hit on the same chart in "My, Oh My" as well. After its release, both Branch and Harp returned to being solo singers. Harp has since had top 40 country success of her own with the single "Boy Like Me".

== Music career ==
=== Career success: Stand Still, Look Pretty ===
In 2005, Michelle Branch recruited her longtime friend and backing vocalist Jessica Harp on a new musical venture, incorporating elements from both Branch's pop-rock style and Harp's country style to form the Wreckers, a shortened form of "the Cass County Homewreckers", a band name idea from Branch's then husband, Teddy Landau. They were soon signed to Maverick Records.

The Wreckers' song "The Good Kind"—originally recorded by Harp—was featured on the hit teen television series One Tree Hill. They performed this song on the show on February 8, 2005. Later that month, the duo embarked on the nationwide One Tree Hill Tour alongside Gavin DeGraw, Tyler Hilton, and Bethany Joy Galeotti. Branch later expressed her dislike of going on tour without releasing an album first, and the Wreckers then attempted to release their debut album, Stand Still, Look Pretty.

The album was finally released in May 2006, led off by the single "Leave the Pieces", a number one country hit. It was followed by a heavy promotional radio campaign by the band which allowed it to make the top five on the country music albums chart in the United States, the top twenty on the Billboard 200, and the number one album on the United Kingdom Country Chart. This allowed them to have various live performances including one in Indianapolis, Indiana, at Monument Circle in August 2006, and on tour as Rascal Flatts's opening act during the summer of 2006, in addition to playing smaller club dates as headliners. "My, Oh My", was the second single from Stand Still, Look Pretty, and its video was filmed on the Wild West stage at Universal Studios Hollywood.

The band were nominated for "Vocal Duo of the Year" at the 40th Annual CMA Awards, but lost to Brooks & Dunn. In December 2006, they were nominated for a Grammy Award for "Best Country Performance by a Duo or Group with Vocal" for "Leave the Pieces." Moreover, the band also released a cover of the country song "Strawberry Wine", originally sung by Deana Carter, and performed it live on the 2006 CMA Awards.

=== Split-up and recording solo albums ===
In February 2008, it was announced the group had split to focus on their solo careers. The duo has since stated that their next recording projects will be solo albums. Jessica Harp has stated that they will continue the Wreckers as a side project, but solo albums are what "feels right" for now. Harp released her first solo single, "Boy Like Me" from her debut album A Woman Needs, in March 2009. The single was a Top 30 hit on the charts, and was followed by the album's title track, which reached No. 56 after a short chart run. On March 16, 2010, Harp's album was digitally released following an announcement that she would retire from her recording career to focus on songwriting. Meanwhile, Branch released the single "Sooner or Later" in August 2009 and released her six-song EP Everything Comes and Goes on September 14, 2010.

== Discography ==
The Wreckers discography
- Studio albums: 1
- Live albums: 1
- Singles: 5
- Video albums: 1
- Music videos: 4

=== Studio albums ===
Title	Album details	Peak chart positions			Sales	Certifications (sales threshold)
Title	Album details	US	US Country	CAN	Sales	Certifications (sales threshold)
Stand Still, Look Pretty	Release date: May 23, 2006; Label: Maverick Records; Formats: CD, music download	14	4	91	US: 856,000	RIAA: Gold

=== Live albums ===
Title	Album details
Way Back Home: Live at New York City	Release date: December 4, 2007; Label: Maverick/Warner Bros. Records; Formats: CD, music download

=== Singles ===
==== As lead artist ====
Year	Single	Peak chart positions						Certifications	Sales	Album
Year	Single	US	US Country	US Pop	US Adult	AUS	CAN Country	Certifications	Sales	Album
2005	"The Good Kind"	115	—	—	—	—	—			Stand Still, Look Pretty
2006	"Leave the Pieces"	34	1	54	19	73	1	RIAA: Gold	US: 1,155,000	Stand Still, Look Pretty
2006	"My, Oh My"	87	9	—	—	—	6			Stand Still, Look Pretty
2007	"Tennessee"	—	33	—	—	—	—			Stand Still, Look Pretty
"—" denotes releases that did not chart

==== As featured artist ====
Year	Single	Artist	Peak chart positions						Album
Year	Single	Artist	US	US Pop	US AC	US Adult	CAN AC	CAN HAC	Album
2005	"I'm Feeling You" (Note: Song was credited as Santana with Michelle Branch and the Wreckers.)	Santana	55	53	5	6	5	6	All That I Am

=== Music videos ===
Year	Video	Director
2005	"I'm Feeling You" (with Santana)	
2006	"Leave the Pieces"	Trey Fanjoy
2006	"My, Oh My"	Paul Boyd
2007	"Tennessee"	

== Awards and nominations ==
Year	Organization	Category	Result
2006	Country Music Association	Vocal Duo of the Year	Nominated
2006	Academy of Country Music	Top New Vocal Duo or Group	Nominated
2006	Academy of Country Music	Top Vocal Duo	Nominated
2007	Grammy Awards	Best Country Performance by a Duo or Group with Vocal — ("Leave the Pieces" )	Nominated
2007	Music Row Awards	Major Label Breakout Artist of the Year	Won
2007	R&R Readers' Poll	Best New Performer	Won
2007	Country Music Association	Vocal Duo of the Year	Nominated
2007	Academy of Country Music	Top New Vocal Duo or Group	Nominated
2008	Country Music Association	Vocal Duo of the Year	Nominated
