= Es De Verdad =

Single by Belinda

from the album Utopía²
- Released: October 1, 2007 (Airplay)
- Recorded: 2007
- Genre: Pop
- Length: 3:36
- Label: EMI Televisa Music
- Songwriters: Reyli Barba Arrocha, Karen Juantorena Foyo, Diego González
- Producer: Armando Ávila

Belinda singles chronology
"Alguien Más" (2007)	"Es De Verdad" (2007)	"If We Were" (2007)

Audio
- "Es De Verdad" on YouTube

"Es De Verdad" (English: "It's For Real/It's The Truth"), is the first official single from Belinda's re-release album "Utopía²".

== Information ==
It was released as the fourth single in the U.S. after the release of "Luz Sin Gravedad". The song was written by Reyli, Karen Juantorena and Diego González, and produced by Armando Ávila. The song didn't receive a music video.

=== Track list ===
Digital Download

1. Es De Verdad

== Charts ==
The song debuted at number forty-eight on the Hot Latin Songs chart, and peaked at number forty-one on that chart. Also debuted at number twenty-five on the Latin Pop Airplay chart, and peaked at number eighteen on that chart.

Chart (2007)	Peak position
U.S. Billboard Hot Latin Songs	41
U.S. Billboard Latin Pop Airplay	18
Chart (2008)	Peak position
U.S. Billboard Latin Pop Airplay	36
Venezuela Top 200	186
