= Ni Freud ni tu mamá =

"Ni Freud Ni Tu Mamá"

Single by Belinda

from the album Utopía
- Released: September 19, 2006 ("Ni Freud Ni Tu Mamá"); August 28, 2007 ("If We Were"); March 17, 2008 ("If We Were")
- Recorded: 2006
- Genre: Electropop; pop rock
- Length: 3:24
- Label: EMI Televisa
- Songwriters: Belinda Peregrín; Nacho Peregrín; Greg Wells; Shelly Peiken
- Producer: Greg Wells

Belinda singles chronology
"Dance with Me" (2006)	"Ni Freud Ni Tu Mamá" (2006)	"Bella Traición" (2007)

Belinda singles chronology
"Es De Verdad" (2007)	"If We Were" (2007)	"Your Hero" (2008)

Music video
- "Ni Freud Ni Tu Mamá" on YouTube

Audio
- "Ni Freud Ni Tu Mamá" on YouTube

Alternative cover
- "If We Were" digital download

Alternative cover
- "If We Were" Maxi CD single

"Ni Freud Ni Tu Mamá" (English: "Neither Freud Nor Your Mother") is a song by Spanish singer-songwriter and actress Belinda from her second studio album, Utopía (2006). It was produced by Greg Wells and written by Belinda, Nacho Peregrín, Wells and Shelly Peiken. The song was released as the lead single from Utopía on September 19, 2006, by EMI Televisa Music. The English version, "If We Were", is Belinda's most successful crossover single to date.

== Release ==
"Ni Freud Ni Tu Mamá" debuted on August 21, 2006, on the Mexican radio stations and became a top-five hit single in Central and South America.

The single was released on iTunes on September 19, 2006 and the song was used as the opening theme for the Mexican telenovela, Código Postal, in Univision Puerto Rico. The English version of the song, titled "If We Were", was featured on the re-release of Utopía, known as Utopía², and it was also released as a single on iTunes on August 28, 2007.

== Music video ==
The music video was directed by Scott Speer. The video depicts Belinda swimming in an underwater urban setting in the middle of what appears to be a storm. It has been reported that Belinda found singing in perflubron challenging. She appears to be floating in the air. She's also seen singing with her band. Near the bridge of the song, guest stars, Drew Seeley and Raven-Symoné (Belinda's friend and The Cheetah Girls 2 co-star) can be found street-dancing around Belinda. The video was released on October 10, 2006. There is a director's cut version of "Ni Freud Ni Tu Mamá" and it can be viewed on YouTube.

With the release of "If We Were" in Europe, Belinda re-shot some scenes of her singing in English and edited the original music video with the new scenes. The video became quite successful in Italy, where it peaked at number 6 on the TRL Italy Countdown. There are two edited versions of "If We Were", both of which can be viewed on YouTube. Both versions clip "Ni Freud Ni Tu Mamá", but the first uses an edited version of the song, and does not show Belinda actually singing. The second, however, clips the parts where Belinda is not singing or the words don't need to fit, and uses new scenes, recorded in English.

== Track listing ==
These are the formats and track listings of major single releases of "Ni Freud Ni Tu Mamá" and "If We Were".

Ni Freud Ni Tu Mamá - Digital Download
(B000T1EOHK; Released September 19, 2007)

1. Ni Freud Ni Tu Mamá (Album Version)

Ni Freud Ni Tu Mamá - Club Promo

1. Ni Freud Ni Tu Mamá (Dance Version)
2. Ni Freud Ni Tu Mamá (Pop Version)
3. Ni Freud Ni Tu Mamá (Reggaeton Version)

Ni Freud Ni Tu Mamá - Remixes CD

1. Ni Freud Ni Tu Mamá (Original Version)
2. Ni Freud Ni Tu Mamá (Piano Version)
3. Ni Freud Ni Tu Mamá (Pop Version)
4. Ni Freud NI Tu Mamá (Soft Rock Version)
5. Ni Freud Ni Tu Mamá (Alternative Version)
6. Ni Freud Ni Tu Mamá (Remix)

If We Were - Digital Download
(B000VI791E; Released August 28, 2007)

1. If We Were (Album Version)

If We Were - Promo CD
(B000XQ9N22; Released January 1, 2007)

1. If We Were
2. Ni Freud Ni Tu Mamá

If We Were - CD Maxi
(B000XQ9N22; Released November 23, 2007)

1. If We Were
2. Good... Good
3. Never Enough
4. Ni Freud Ni Tu Mamá

Ni Freud Ni Tu Mamá / If We Were - Brazilian Digital Download

1. Ni Freud Ni Tu Mamá - 3:24
2. If We Were - 3:25
3. Ni Freud Ni Tu Mamá (Soft Rock Version) - 3:18
4. If We Were (Acoustic Version) - 3:29

If We Were - Brazilian Maxi Single

1. If We Were
2. See A Little Light
3. End Of The Day
4. Never Enough
5. Why Wait?
6. Your Hero (feat. Finley)

== Charts ==
=== "Ni Freud Ni Tu Mamá" ===
Chart (2006)	Peak position
US Hot Latin Songs (Billboard)	38
US Latin Pop Airplay (Billboard)	16
US Tropical Airplay (Billboard)	31

=== "If We Were" ===
Chart (2008)	Peak position
US Pop 100 (Billboard)	77
