= Aleksandr Kogan (singer) =

Russian singer (born 1980)

Aleksandr Kogan Александр Коган
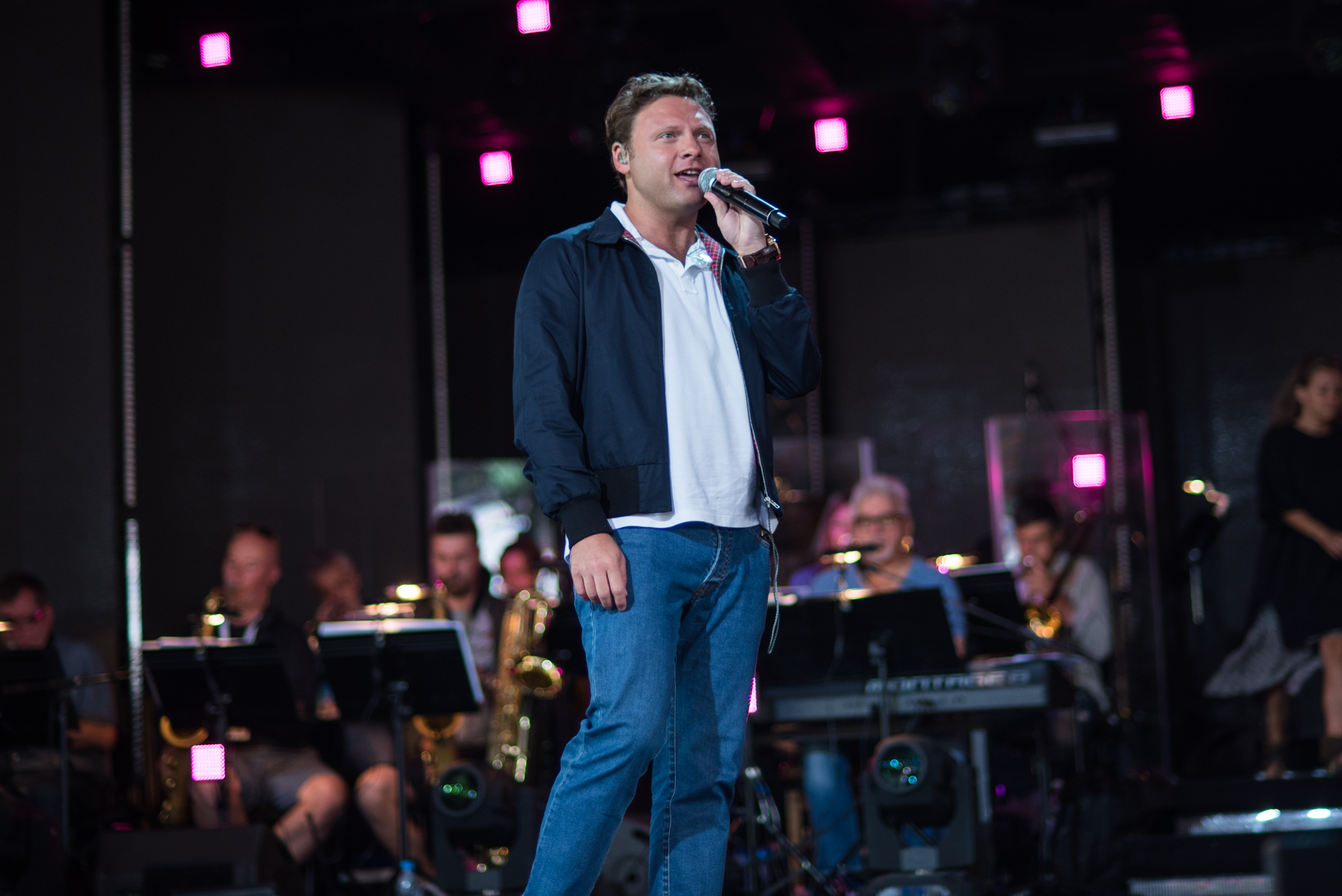
- Kogan in 2017

Background information
- Born: 15 April 1980 (age 46); Dushanbe, Tajik Soviet Socialist Republic
- Genres: pop; jazz
- Occupations: Singer, composer, musician, political scientist

Aleksandr Valeryevich Kogan (Russian: Александр Валерьевич Коган; born 15 April 1980, in Dushanbe, Tajik Soviet Socialist Republic) is a Russian singer, songwriter and film actor. He is the winner of the Golden Gramophone (2013, 2014), RU.TV (2015) and Song of the Year (2013, 2014, 2015) awards.

== Early life ==
Aleksandr Kogan was born оп 15 April 1980, in Dushanbe, Tajikistan. When he was 6, his family moved to Moscow. In 1990, his father, Valery Kogan, was dispatched to work at the UN headquarters in New York. The family left for the United States to return later.

From 1995 to 1998, Aleksandr attended Woodside Priory School in California. He later attended George Mason University in Virginia, where he graduated with a degree in Political Science. Не plays piano and guitar.

== Career beginnings ==
Aleksandr Kogan has been passionate about music since childhood. The songs of Frank Sinatra, Nat King Cole, Louis Armstrong and Chris Isaak could be heard from his room. His family and close friends could often watch home performances. At the age of ten, Aleksandr visited a large-scale music show for the first time. The show was held at the Olympic Stadium in Moscow, where Kogan went together with his elder sister, who worked as a journalist for a fashion magazine at that time.He had a chance not опly to see the show from the viewing stand, but also to attend the sound check session backstage and even to chat with the musicians.That day and the experience of feeling the energy of the live music, hearing the storm of applause and seeing the performers' emotions on stage became a landmark in his life.

Aleksandr wrote his first song at the age of 14. At the age of 18, when studying at the University in Washington, he founded his first music band. Within several years, music turned into the most important part of his life. During his university years, he toured the US.

== Music career ==
Kogan took interest in playing the piano at the age of 7. At the age of 14, he created his first solo piano pieces. At 18, he established his first music band. Не was studying and creating at the same time, playing in musical bands while going for a degree, performing at student parties. Не went on tour around the United States. Upon graduation, he returned to Moscow. In 2001, he began to work with Alla Pugacheva. Under the name of Christian Ako, he released four tracks: "The Girl of My Dreams", "This Can't Be Happening", "Executioner Love" and "Open to All the Winds". From 2004 to 2010, he was performing solo and had a chance to work with American producers Walter Afanasieff and David Foster, as well as to arrange a solo music show in New York.

In 2011, he began to collaborate with a Russian songwriter and producer Viktor Drobysh. This teamwork resulted 'п the single "Who Invented the World". With this song, Kogan won his first Golden Gramophone Award. This was followed By the songs "Who Was the One to Break Up" and "I'm Waiting for a Call" (feat. Mikhail Gutseriev).

After an encounter with Julio Iglesias, music evolved from a favorite hobby to a profession. Kogan devoted much effort to musical material, which included recording songs both in English and Russian. Не started collaborating with the American producers, David Foster and Walter Afanasieff, and gave a solo concert in New York.

In 2012, Aleksandr began to work with a well-known Russian songwriter and producer Victor Drobysh. Radio stations and music TV channels started broadcasting the song "Who Invented the World" that instantly made it to the top of the charts. Aleksandr was invited to perform as a guest of honor at tl1e Slavic Bazaar festival in Vitebsk and at the international competition of young singers New Wave 2013 in Jurmala. In winter 2013, Aleksandr Kogan took part in the Song of the Year show and won the Golden Gramophone Award with his song "Who Invented the World". The singer's artistic background now also includes a duet with Valeria.

In the spring of 2014, with his video Who Invented the World, Aleksandr was nominated for the Russian Music Award of RU.TV channel in tl1e Getting High category. At the same time, Kogan's new song "Who Was the One to Break Up" went on air and climbed to the top of the charts immediately. In May, a video with the same name was presented to the public and became one of the most anticipated video premieres of the spring.

In July 2014, Aleksandr performed at the Slavic Bazaar and the New Wave international competition once again.In the autumn of the same year, a new hit song "I'm Waiting for a Call" went on air оп Russian radio stations and music ТV channels. In November 2014, Alexander received his second Golden Gramophone Award for the song 'Who Was the One to Break Up".

In March 2015, there was a milestone event in the performer's career, Aleksandr presented the long-awaited debut album I'm Waiting for a Call to the Russian audience. The album includes 14 songs. It took the singer almost two years to release this album. In May 2015, with his video "I'm Waiting for a Call", Alexander Kogan won the Dolce Vita award at the 5th Russian Music Award festival organized By RU.TV Channel.

In March 2015, he released his debut solo album I'm Waiting for a Call. In November 2015, Alexander went оп his first tour of central Russia.

In September 2016, Kogan presented a video for the song "Happiness": "Music and songwriting must be sincere. I've always tried to ensure that my songs bring joy and make people feel good. Thank you for your support and inspiration!"

== Discography ==
=== Studio albums ===
- "l'm Waiting for a Call" (2015)

==== Track listing ====
Album: l'm Waiting for a Call

- "Radio"
- "Who Invented the World"
- "I'm Waiting for a Call"
- "I Love You the Way I Want То"
- "Who Was the One to Break Up"
- "Moscow Girl"
- "But for You"
- "Don't Say"
- "I Don't Believe You"
- "Reflection"
- "You're Dancing"
- "You're Far Away"
- "The Feast of Love"
- "Who Was the One to Break Up" RMХ

== Awards ==
2013: Golden Gramophone Award for the song "Who Invented the World".

2014: Golden Gramophone Award for the song "Who Was the One to Break Up".

2015: RU.TV Award (Dolce Vita category).

== Music videos ==
Year	Video	Producer	Album
2002	"The Girl of My Dreams"	Irina Mironova	without album
2003	"Executioner Love"	Fyodor Bondarchuk	without album
2008	"I Will"	Scott Speer	without album
2009	"You Live in My Head"	Honey	without album
2009	"Leaving Tomorrow Behind"	Sean Ellis	without album
2013	"Who Invented the World"	Alexey Potapenko	«I'm Waiting for a Call»
2014	"Who Was the One to Break"	Alan Badoev	«I'm Waiting for a Call»
2014	"I'm Waiting for a Call"	Georgy Toidze, Ilva Smolin	«I'm Waiting for a Call»
2015	"But for You"	Aslan Akhmadov	«I'm Waiting for a Call»
2016	"Happiness"	Yuri Volev	

== Acting career ==
In 2013, Aleksandr Kogan made a small appearance as a Russian singer in the movie Safe by the Hollywood film director Boaz Yakin, with Jason Statham starring.
