= Pier Pressure (festival) =

- Genre: Alternative rock, Pop, Metal, Punk
- Locations: Gothenburg, Sweden
- Years active: 2007 - present
- Website: http://www.pierpressure.se

Pier Pressure is a music festival held in Gothenburg, Sweden. The first festival was held in 2007 and sold over 18,000 tickets.

With two stages and a close-up stage, 2007 Pier Pressure hosted 21 bands, mostly from Sweden.

== Artists ==
In 2007, Pier Pressure hosted:

- My Chemical Romance
- Avril Lavigne
- Billy Talent
- CKY
- Less Than Jake
- Gogol Bordello
- Enter Shikari
- Sunrise Avenue
- Finley
- The Sounds
- Sugarplum Fairy
- Mando Diao
- Loving Chokes
- Blindside
- Sounds Like Violence
- April Divine
- Neverstore
- Kid Down
- Chemical Vocation
- Early To Bed
- Tony Clifton
