= Prima Cassetta di Musica Tamarra =

Studio album by Tony Tammaro
- Released: 1989
- Recorded: 1987–1989 in Naples, Italy
- Genre: Pop, Neapolitan song
- Producer: Tony Tammaro

Tony Tammaro chronology
Prima Cassetta di Musica Tamarra (1989)	Nun Chiagnere Marì (1991)

Prima Cassetta di Musica Tamarra (Italian for First tape of "tamarra" music) is the first studio album by Neapolitan parody singer-songwriter Tony Tammaro.

== Description ==
In this album, Tony Tammaro shows who are tamarri (i.e. rough people that imitate manners of high society) in his home city and starts to talk about Neapoletan society with his funny songs. The lead track is Patrizia, that became very popular and helped him to have a successful career.

== Track listing ==
All tracks were written and composed by Tony Tammaro

  - Patrizia (2:26)
  - Il parco dell'amore (2:59)
  - U Strunzu (2:45)
  - 'A cinquecento (2:40)
  - Si piglio 'o posto (1:56)
  - Torregaveta (2:34)
  - Alla fiera della casa (2:19)
  - La pubblicità (2:20)
  - Zio Tobia (1:28)
  - Il rock dei tamarri (2:00)
