= Da Granto Farò il Cantanto =

Studio album by Tony Tammaro
- Released: 1992
- Recorded: 1991–1992 in Naples, Italy
- Genre: Pop, Neapolitan song
- Producer: Tony Tammaro

Tony Tammaro chronology
Nun Chiagnere Marì (1991)	Da Granto Farò il Cantanto (1992)	Se Potrei Avere Te (1993)

Da Granto Farò il Cantanto (Italian for "When I grow up, I'll be a singer") is the third studio album release by Neapolitan parody singer-songwriter Tony Tammaro. The words Granto and Cantanto are written in a wrong way because you may write Grande and Cantante in correct Italian.

== Track list ==
All tracks written and composed by Tony Tammaro.

  - Scalea (1:48)
  - Miché (1:51)
  - 'O Sacchetto (1:44)
  - A casa per le sette (2:07)
  - Mio fratello fuma scrock (1:28)
  - Samba du gassu (1:44)
  - Teorema (2:18)
  - Anni sessanta (5:46)
  - Fidanzati in casa (2:32)
  - Al Cafone (1:47)
  - Come (2:38)
