= Adrenalina (album) =

Studio album by Finley
- Released: 15 June 2007
- Recorded: 2007
- Genre: Pop-punk
- Length: 41:33
- Label: EMI

Finley chronology
Tutto è possibile (2006)	Adrenalina (2007)	Fuori! (2010)

Alternative cover
- Adrenalina 2 cover

Adrenalina is Finley's second studio album. It was released on 15 June 2007 by EMI.

An extended edition of the album with 20 songs, entitled Adrenalina 2, was released on 28 February 2008. It was certified platinum.

== Track listing ==
=== Adrenalina ===
All tracks are written by Marco Pedretti, Carmine Ruggiero, Stefano Mantegazza and Danilo Calvio.

No.	Title	Length
1.	"Niente da perdere"	3:30
2.	"Adrenalina"	2:55
3.	"C'è qualcosa che non va"	3:12
4.	"Ad occhi chiusi"	3:41
5.	"Qui per voi"	4:20
6.	"Veleno"	2:54
7.	"Questo sono io"	3:17
8.	"Domani"	3:49
9.	"Mai più"	4:04
10.	"Voglio"	3:15
11.	"Lies are all around me"	3:23
12.	"Satisfied"	3:13
Total length:		41:33

=== Adrenalina 2 ===
All tracks are written by Marco Pedretti, Carmine Ruggiero, Stefano Mantegazza and Danilo Calvio.

No.	Title	Length
1.	"Ad occhi chiusi"	3:42
2.	"Domani"	3:48
3.	"Adrenalina"	2:55
4.	"Mai più"	4:04
5.	"Driving to Nowhere"	3:13
6.	"Ricordi"	3:58
7.	"Qui per voi"	4:11
8.	"Drops of time"	2:53
9.	"C'è qualcosa che non va"	3:11
10.	"Questo sono io"	3:17
11.	"Voglio"	3:16
12.	"Satisfied"	3:14
13.	"Lies are all around me"	3:23
14.	"Iris"	3:28
15.	"Your Hero"	3:59
16.	"My Blinded Eyes"	3:41
17.	"All I've Got"	3:10
18.	"Just for You"	4:15
19.	"Medley live: Fumo e cenere/Diventerai una star/Tutto è possibile"	4:32
20.	"Niente da perdere"	3:37

== Personnel ==
- Marco Pedretti – lead vocals
- Carmine Ruggiero – guitars, vocals
- Stefano Mantegazza – bass, vocals
- Danilo Calvio – drums, vocals

== Charts ==
=== Weekly charts ===
Weekly chart performance for Adrenalina
Chart (2007)	Peak position
Italian Albums (FIMI)	2

Weekly chart performance for Adrenalina 2
Chart (2008)	Peak position
Italian Albums (FIMI)	4

=== Year-end charts ===
Year-end chart performance for Adrenalina
Chart (2007)	Position
Italian Albums (FIMI)	48

Year-end chart performance for Adrenalina 2
Chart (2008)	Position
Italian Albums (FIMI)	87
