= Bella Traición =

Single by Belinda

from the album Utopía
- Released: January 26, 2007
- Recorded: 2006
- Genre: Pop rock
- Length: 3:45
- Label: EMI Televisa Music
- Songwriters: Belinda, Nacho Peregrín, Kara DioGuardi, Mitch Allan
- Producers: Kara DioGuardi, Mitch Allan

Belinda singles chronology
"Ni Freud Ni Tu Mamá" (2006)	"Bella Traición" (2007)	"Luz Sin Gravedad" (2007)

Music video
- "Bella Traición" on YouTube

Audio
- "Bella Traición" on YouTube

Alternative cover

"Bella Traición" (English: "Beautiful Betrayal"), is the official second single from Mexican singer-songwriter Belinda for her second studio album Utopía (2006).

== Information ==
The song debuted at number 32 in the U.S. Billboard Hot Latin Tracks and at number 28 in Los 40 Principales. On August 29, 2007, the song received a Latin Grammy nomination for Song of the Year. The English version called "End of the Day", was featured on the re-release of the album, known as Utopía², but didn't have a release, like the other two singles.

== Music video ==
The music video was directed by Scott Speer who also directed Ni Freud Ni Tu Mamá. The music video begins in a library with Belinda opening a book called "Bella Traición." She then appears in an old house playing two different characters dressed in goth costumes and singing with her band. The video ends with her in the same pose as in her album cover Utopía. She is even seen in confession. The video was released March 5, 2007, and on October 18, 2007, it won for Video Of The Year at the Los Premios MTV Latinoamérica 2007.

== Track listing ==
These are the formats and track listings of major single releases of "Bella Traición".

Bella Traición - Digital Download

1. Bella Traición

Bella Traición - Promo CD

1. Bella Traición — Belinda
2. Sufre Conmigo — Mœnia

== Charts ==
=== Bella Traición ===
Chart (2007 - 2008)	Peak position
Spain (PROMUSICAE)	14
Spain Digital Songs (PROMUSICAE)	20
US Hot Latin Songs (Billboard)	14
US Latin Pop Airplay (Billboard)	12
US Latin Tropical Airplay (Billboard)	11
