= Nun Chiagnere Marì =

Studio album by Tony Tammaro
- Released: 1991
- Recorded: 1989–1991 in Naples, Italy
- Genre: Pop, Neapolitan song
- Producer: Tony Tammaro

Tony Tammaro chronology
Prima Cassetta di Musica Tamarra (1989)	Nun Chiagnere Marì (1991)	Da Granto Farò il Cantanto (1992)

Nun Chiagnere Marì (Neapolitan for Don't Cry, Mary) is the second studio album by Neapolitan parody singer-songwriter Tony Tammaro.

== Track list ==
All tracks were written and composed by Tony Tammaro

  - Dinta villa (2:46)
  - L'animale (2:43)
  - Volo di un cazettino (3:28)
  - La villeggiatura (3:15)
  - Il mozzarellista (3:17)
  - Aerobic Tamar Dance (3:53)
  - Pronto Marì (2:23)
  - Tango dei tamarri (4:00)
  - U Curnudu (2:43)
  - Puzzulan Rap (2:23)
