= Boy Like Me =

Single by Jessica Harp

from the album A Woman Needs
- Released: March 9, 2009
- Genre: Country
- Length: 3:47
- Label: Warner Bros. Nashville
- Songwriter: Jerry Flowers
- Producer: Jerry Flowers

Jessica Harp singles chronology
"Boy Like Me" (2009)	"A Woman Needs" (2010)

Alternative cover
- Digital release cover

Music video
- "Boy Like Me" at CMT.com

"Boy Like Me" is a song written by Jerry Flowers, originally one-third of the American band The Ranch, and recorded by American country music artist Jessica Harp as the first single to her second album A Woman Needs. "Boy Like Me" was released as a digital download on February 10, 2009, and was released as a single to country radio on March 9, 2009. This is Harp's first solo single release, and her first release since The Wreckers, a country duo consisting of Harp and Michelle Branch, was placed on hold in favor of solo careers for both members.

== Content ==
"Boy Like Me" is an up-tempo country song backed primarily with banjo, and also features guitar and cowbell. The narrator of the song is expressing her satisfaction with having finally found a male who is suitable for her.

== Critical reception ==
"Boy Like Me" received positive reviews from critics. Karlie Justus of Engine 145 gave the song a "thumbs up". Although she described the production unfavorably, saying "Harp’s pipes are constantly at odds with guitar riff upon banjo pickin’ upon cowbell." Of the lyrics, she said, "[The chorus is] a hooky, interesting juxtaposition of praise and worship interjections and visions of loose lovin’ and, as she twangs it, 'drankin'." Matt Bjorke of Roughstock also spoke positively of the song, "'Boy Like Me' is simply an infectious and fun song. It's just the kind of track to help Jessica break through the female artist glass ceiling at country radio." MusicRow described the song as "a sassy lyric about finding a guy who’s just like her, right down to the drinkin’ and makin’ love parts. She wails it. Solid work."

== Music video ==
A music video, directed by Scott Speer, was released for the song on March 3, 2009. In the video, Harp is portrayed as a housewife. Harp is shown preparing breakfast for a man in the morning, having a food fight with him over dinner, and ending the day with a pillowfight in the bedroom. Mixed in are scenes of Harp singing into a microphone in a hallway, lying in a bath tub, and tossing photographs into the air while on a bed.

== Chart performance ==
"Boy Like Me" debuted at number 58 on the Billboard Hot Country Songs chart for the week of March 28, 2009. After spending 14 weeks on the chart, it reached a peak of number 30 in June 2009.

Chart (2009)	Peak position
US Hot Country Songs (Billboard)	30
