= Luz Sin Gravedad =

"Luz Sin Gravedad"/"See a Little Light"

Single by Belinda

from the album Utopía
- Released: May 29, 2007 (Spanish version); March 21, 2008 (English version)
- Recorded: 2006
- Genre: Pop
- Length: 4:01
- Label: EMI Televisa
- Songwriters: Belinda Peregrín Schüll, Nacho Peregrín, Jimmy Harry
- Producer: Jimmy Harry

Belinda singles chronology
"Bella Traición" (2007)	"Luz Sin Gravedad"/"See a Little Light" (2007)	"Alguien Más" (2007)

Belinda singles chronology
"Your Hero" (2008)	"See a Little Light" (2008)	""Te Quiero (Remix)"" (2008)

Music video
- "Luz Sin Gravedad" on YouTube

Audio
- "Luz Sin Gravedad" on YouTube

Alternative cover
- "See A Little Light/Luz Sin Gravedad" Maxi Single

"Luz Sin Gravedad" (English: "Light Without Gravity"), is the third official single from Belinda's second studio album Utopía. The English version, "See a Little Light", was released as the second single from the international release of the album.

== Music video ==
The video begins in a ballet class where Belinda is having problems dancing. Her teacher pushes her and yells at her. Belinda's peers begin to laugh at her and she leaves the class. She walks the streets in her tutu, and is pushed by people. It then starts to rain and she begins to dance again. Belinda also plays the piano in the video. The video was released on March 13, 2007. The English version has some scenes re-recorded to fit in the language and was released March, 2008. Both versions were directed by Scott Speer.

== Track listing ==
Maxi Single
(B0016UJYG4; Released April 21, 2008)

1. "See A Little Light" - 4:04
2. "Luz Sin Gravedad" - 4:01
3. "If We Were" (Acoustic) - 3:29
4. "See A Little Light" (Acoustic) - 4:09

Brazilian digital download

1. "Luz Sin Gravedad" - 4:01
2. "See A Little Light" - 4:04
3. "See A Little Light" (Acoustic) - 4:09
4. "Es De Verdad" - 3:36
5. "Your Hero" (feat. Finley) - 4:00
6. "Never Enough" - 3:10

== Charts ==
Chart (2007)	Peak position
Russian Airplay (Tophit) (English Version "See A Little Light")	274
US Latin Pop Airplay (Billboard)	29

== Official versions ==
- Luz Sin Gravedad (Album Version)
- See A Little Light (Album Version)
- See A Little Light (Acoustic Version)
