= Alguien Más =

Single by Belinda

from the album Utopía
- Released: September 2007
- Recorded: 2006
- Genre: Pop rock, teen pop
- Length: 3:12
- Label: EMI Televisa Music
- Songwriter(s): Belinda, Nacho Peregrin, Kara DioGuardi, Mitch Allan
- Producer(s): Mitch Allan

Belinda singles chronology
"Luz Sin Gravedad" (2007)	"Alguien Más" (2007)	"Es De Verdad" (2007)

Audio
- "Alguien Más" on YouTube

Alternative cover
- "Alguien Más" Promo

"Alguien Más" (English: "Someone Else") is the fourth single from Belinda's second studio album Utopía.

== Background ==
The song was released to radio in September 2007, but it was less successful than her previous single, "Luz Sin Gravedad".

To choose the fourth single, Belinda did a survey to her fans, which won "Alguien Más", followed by "Never Enough", "Amiga Soledad", "Pudo Ser Tan Fácil" and "Good... Good". Unlike the first three singles, "Alguien Más" doesn't have an English version.

== Composition ==
The single was written by Belinda, Nacho Peregín, Kara DioGuardi and Mitch Allan, who also produced the song. The song is about a girl whose boyfriend is not acting the same; she feels there is some other girl (someone else) that he is seeing.

=== Track list ===
Digital download/Promo

1. Alguien Más – 3:13

== Music video ==
According to the official Belinda's site, the artist filmed the music video in late July 2007, where she was the producer and guionist. It was to be released but the video was cancelled for unknown reasons. But even though the song was not promoted with a video, it entered the top 100 of the Mexican and Chilean Charts.
