= Tutto Tony Tammaro =

Greatest hits album by Tony Tammaro
- Released: 1999
- Recorded: 1989–1997
- Genre: Pop, Neapolitan song
- Producer: Tony Tammaro

Tony Tammaro chronology
Monnezzarium (1997)	Tutto Tony Tammaro (1999)	The Dark Side of the Moonnezz (2005)

Tutto Tony Tammaro (Italian for All Tony Tammaro) is the double CD greatest hits by Neapolitan parody singer-songwriter Tony Tammaro. It was released in 1999 and included all songs composed by the singer during his musical career.

== Track listing ==
=== Vol.1 ===
1. Patrizia (2:26)
2. Il parco dell'amore (2:59)
3. Scalea (1:48)
4. E va facite appere (3:18)
5. Volo di un cazettino (3:28)
6. Tiene 'e ccorna (3:18)
7. Fidanzati in casa (2:32)
8. Foto di gruppo (3:54)
9. Al Cafone (1:47)
10. Restituiscimi il mio cuore (4:11)
11. A casa per le sette (2:07)
12. U Strunzu (2:45)
13. Quelli con la panza (2:58)
14. Miché (1:51)
15. La pubblicità (2:20)
16. Aerobic Tamar Dance (3:53)
17. 'O Sacchetto (1:44)
18. Ciakkami (3:17)
19. Come (2:38)
20. U Curnudu (2:43)
21. Mio marito (3:11)
22. Teorema (2:18)
23. Chat line (3:40)
24. Chiatta (4:01)

=== Vol.2 ===
1. 'O Trerrote (2:23)
2. La villeggiatura (3:15)
3. Serenata cell (4:20)
4. Mio fratello fuma scrock (1:28)
5. Se potrei avere te (2:23)
6. Il mozzarellista (3:17)
7. Bottana (3:16)
8. Pronto Marì (2:23)
9. Torregaveta (2:34)
10. Tango dei tamarri (4:00)
11. Dint a villa (2:46)
12. Casa Cascella (2:41)
13. Alla fiera della casa (2:19)
14. Un altra guerra (5:10)
15. A cinquecento (2:40)
16. L'animale (2:43)
17. Si piglio 'o posto (1:56)
18. Anni sessanta (5:46)
19. Ballerino (3:21)
20. Zio Tobia (1:28)
21. Samba du gassu (1:44)
22. Puzzulan Rap (2:23)
23. Karaoke (3:18)
24. Il rock dei tamarri (2:00)
