= A Woman Needs (song) =

Single by Jessica Harp

from the album A Woman Needs
- Released: January 19, 2010
- Genre: Country
- Length: 3:40
- Label: Warner Bros. Nashville
- Songwriters: Jerry Flowers; Jessica Harp; Jason Mowery
- Producer: Jerry Flowers

Jessica Harp singles chronology
"Boy Like Me'" (2009)	"A Woman Needs" (2010)

Music video
- "A Woman Needs" at CMT.com

"A Woman Needs" is a song recorded by American country artist Jessica Harp. The song, which is the title-track of Harp's second album, was released to country radio on January 19, 2010, and to digital retailers on December 8, 2009. It is the second and final single from the album, which was digitally released on March 16, 2010.

== Content ==
"A Woman Needs" is an up-tempo country song, featuring a prominent banjo line with fiddle and steel guitar fills. The song's female narrator describes the experience of wanting freedom to do as she pleases; her dad doesn't approve of this, while her mom understands what it's like to be a young woman. The narrator elaborates on some of these things that "a woman needs".

In an interview with Country Music Tattle Tale, Harp revealed that the song is her personal favorite from the album, because it resonated with her personal experience of attempting to land a record deal in country music, and described that "A Woman Needs" set the mood for the rest of the album.

== Reception ==
Matt Bjorke of Roughstock reviewed the song favorably, describing it as a "well-worn 'sow my oats' story [that] weaves into a cohesive mission statement about how we all need to ‘spend time on our own’ to find out who we are." He also spoke positively about the song's production and noted that Harp has a "little rockin’ indie spirit to her music a-la Miranda Lambert." The Georgia Jukebox gave the song a positive review, describing her vocals favorably: "Harp shine[s] through her music with her voice, which is both strong and sexy, and reminds of singers like Alanis Morissette, and features a sound that is equally country and pop."

== Music video ==
The music video, directed by Kristin Barlowe, was filmed on November 19, 2009. It made its premiere on The Boot on January 25, 2010, following a three-part series of behind the scenes videos that were posted weekly leading up to its release. In the making of the video webisodes, Harp described the theme of the video, which is based on the movie Divine Secrets of the Ya-Ya Sisterhood and centers around a woman who was unable to live out her dreams, but is able to see her daughter fulfill those dreams. In the video, Harp is shown with three friends at three different stages of her life; childhood, adolescence, and adulthood. The girls continue to stay friends, originally connected by stars they drew on their hands and later by temporary tattoos applied as teens. In the end, as adults, their friendship lives on in the form of matching permanent tattoos, to signify that they will always be best friends. Additionally, after quitting her job at the coffee shop to follow her dreams of becoming a country singer, her boss supports her decision by giving her an acoustic guitar and a bus ticket to Nashville, Tennessee.

== Chart performance ==
"A Woman Needs" debuted at number 58 on the U.S. Billboard Hot Country Songs chart for the chart week of February 27, 2010, and reached a peak of number 56 in its third week on the chart.

Chart (2010)	Peak position
US Hot Country Songs (Billboard)	56
