= Diventerai una star =

Single by Finley

from the album Tutto è possibile
- Released: 5 May 2006
- Recorded: 2006
- Genre: Pop-punk
- Length: 3:03
- Label: EMI
- Songwriters: Marco Pedretti; Carmine Ruggiero; Stefano Mantegazza; Danilo Calvio
- Producer: Claudio Cecchetto

Finley singles chronology
"Tutto è possibile" (2005)	"Diventerai una star" (2006)	"Dentro alla scatola" (2006)

Music video
- Diventerai una star on YouTube

"Diventerai una star" is the second single by Italian pop rock band Finley. It was released on5 May 2007 as the second single from band's debut album Tutto è possibile. The song was written by the band and produced by Claudio Cecchetto.

It became a summer hit, and it was used also for television commercials. It peaked at number 15 on the Italian singles chart.

== Track listing ==
1. "Diventerai una star"
2. "Ray of Light" (live)
3. "Grief" (live)
4. "Tutto è possibile" (live)
5. "Run Away" (instrumental)

== Personnel ==
- Marco Pedretti - Lead vocals.
- Carmine Ruggiero - Guitars & Vocals.
- Stefano Mantegazza - Bass & Vocals.
- Danilo Calvio - Drums & Vocals.

== Charts ==
Weekly chart performance for "Diventerai una star"
Chart (2006)	Peak position
Italy (FIMI)	15

== Certifications ==
Region	Certification	Certified units/sales
Italy (FIMI)	Gold	50,000^{‡}
^{‡} Sales+streaming figures based on certification alone.
