= Tony Tammaro =

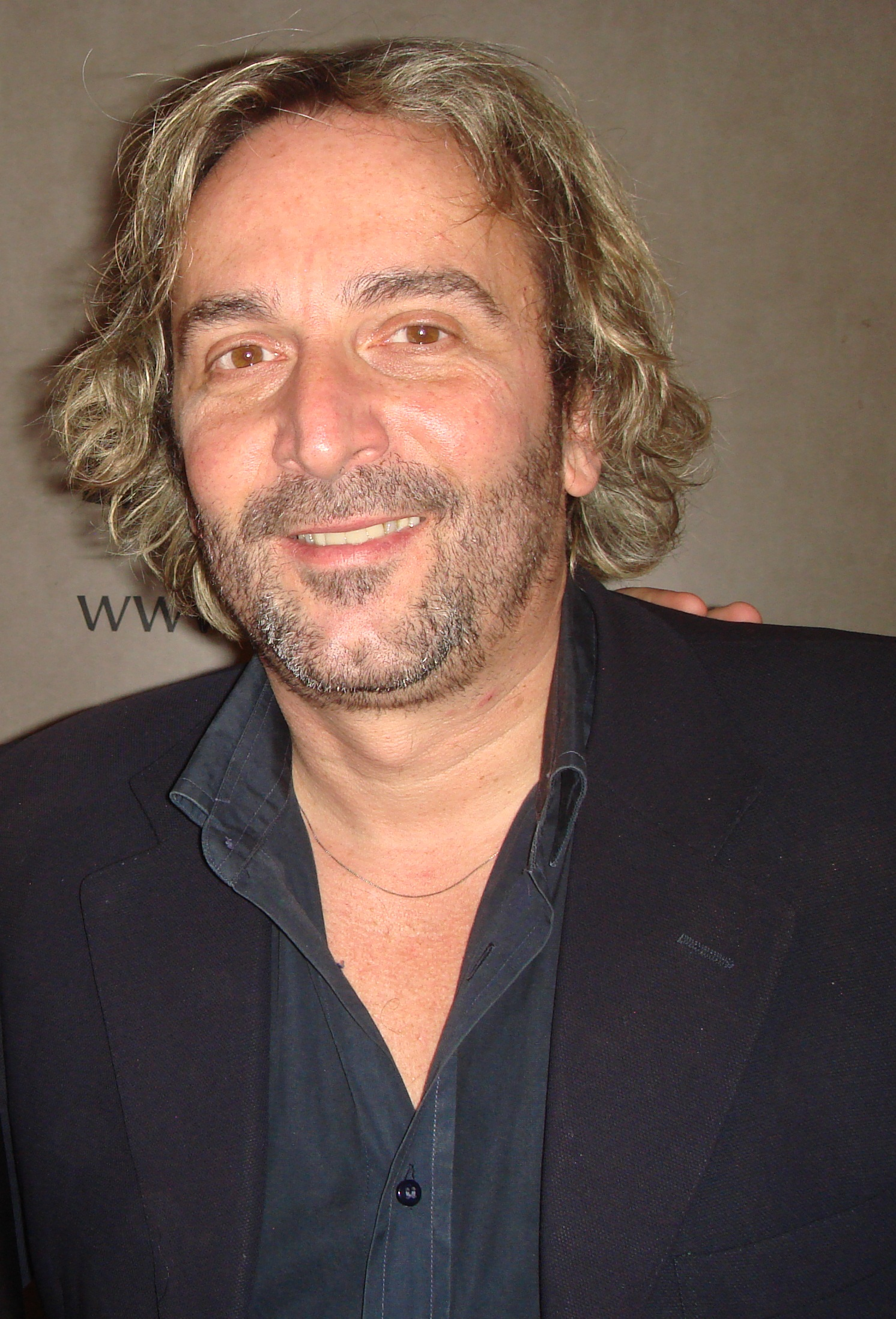

Background information
- Born: Vincenzo Sarnelli; January 7, 1961 (age 65); Naples, Italy
- Genres: Neapolitan song; parody music
- Years active: 1989–present
- Website: Official website

Vincenzo Sarnelli (born January 7, 1961), known by the stage name Tony Tammaro, is an Italian parody singer-songwriter. The main theme of Tammaro's lyrics are tamarri, a term taken from Neapolitan dialect which indicates someone who is vulgar, miseducated, and often boasting a flourishing behaviour. The term could also be translated as "rednecks".

== Career ==
Tammaro started his career in 1989, releasing Prima cassetta di musica tamarra ("First tape of tamarro music").

In 1993 Tony Tammaro was the winner of the 4th edition of Festival di Sanscemo with the song "E v'a facite appere".

In 1997 Tammaro returned to the studio to record the album Monnezzarium and released "'O trerrote" as the first single. Tammaro released his greatest hits album Tutto Tony Tammaro in 1999. It is a double album and each of two CDs is made up of twentyfour songs.

Tony Tammaro and his band released The Dark Side of the Moonnezz in June 2005. The title is a pun on munnezza, the Neapolitan word for "garbage".

== Discography ==
=== Studio albums ===
- 1989: Prima Cassetta di Musica Tamarra
- 1991: Nun Chiagnere Marì
- 1992: Da Granto Farò il Cantanto
- 1993: Se Potrei Avere Te
- 1997: Monnezzarium
- 2005: The Dark Side of the Moonnezz
- 2010: Yes I Cant
- 2015: Tokyo Londra Scalea
- 2025: Musica per tenere calmi i criaturi in macchina

=== Compilation albums ===
- 1999: Tutto Tony Tammaro

== Awards ==
Sanscemo Comedy Music Festival

- Singer: winner in 1993 with E va facite appere
- Writer: winner in 1995 and 1996

Italian National Syndicate of Film Journalists

- Nomination: 2019 Best Original Song for Achille Tarallo
