= Ricordi (Finley song) =

"Ricordi" / "Your Hero"

Single by Finley

from the album Adrenalina 2
- Released: February 26, 2008 (Italian version); March 3, 2008 (English version)
- Recorded: 2007–2008
- Genre: Pop rock, pop punk
- Length: 3:59
- Label: EMI Italy, Capitol Records
- Songwriters: Danilo Calvio, Stefano Mantegazza, Marco Pedretti, Carmine Ruggiero, Daniele Persoglio
- Producer: Claudio Cecchetto

Finley singles chronology
"Questo Sono Io" (2007)	"Ricordi" / "Your Hero" (2008)	"Ad Occhi Chiusi" (2008)

Belinda singles chronology
"If We Were" (2007)	"Your Hero" (2008)	"See A Little Light" (2008)

Alternative cover
- "Your Hero" Digital Download

Music video
- "Ricordi" on YouTube

Music video
- "Your Hero" on YouTube

"Ricordi" (English: "Memories") is a song by the Italian band Finley, from their studio album, Adrenalina 2.

== Information ==
The song was released as single on February 26, 2008 on iTunes and other digital stores. The song was written by the members of the band Danilo Calvio, Stefano Mantegazza, Marco Pedretti, Carmine Ruggiero, Daniele Persoglio.

The song participated on the Sanremo Music Festival 2008 and obtained the fifth place. In March 2008, the band released an English version of the song titled "Your Hero", featuring the Mexican singer Belinda. This version was included on the Belinda's second studio album, Utopía, as a bonus track on its international edition.

== Video ==
The music video of "Ricordi" shows the band singing in different places, while rotating images of people suffering without peace, featuring scenes with Belinda. In the music video of the English version, it shows the band and Belinda performing the song. This version was released on iTunes on May 5, 2008.

== Track listing ==
Digital download
No.	Title	Length
1.	"Ricordi"	3:59
2.	"Your Hero" (featuring Belinda)	3:59

Digital download
No.	Title	Length
1.	"Ricordi"	3:59

Digital download
No.	Title	Length
1.	"Your Hero" (featuring Belinda)	3:59

== Charts ==
Region	Chart	List	Peak position
2008
Italy	FIMI	Italian Singles Chart	40
