= A Woman Needs =

Studio album by Jessica Harp
- Released: March 16, 2010
- Recorded: 2008–2010
- Genre: Country
- Length: 41:09
- Label: Warner Bros. Nashville
- Producer: Jerry Flowers

Jessica Harp chronology
Preface (2002)	A Woman Needs (2010)

Alternative cover
- Digital Release Cover

Singles from A Woman Needs
- 1. "Boy Like Me" Released: March 9, 2009; 2. "A Woman Needs" Released: January 19, 2010

A Woman Needs is the second and final solo studio album by American country music singer Jessica Harp, which was released on March 16, 2010 via Warner Bros. Nashville. It was released to digital retailers following a March 2, 2010 announcement that Harp would retire as a recording artist to focus on becoming a full-time songwriter. Prior to the announcement, the album was slated for a physical release as well in June 2010; instead, the physical copy is only available if ordered through Amazon.com. "Boy Like Me" and the title track were released as the album's first and second singles, respectively; both charted on the U.S. Billboard Hot Country Songs chart, with the former a Top 30 hit.

== Reception ==
Blake Boldt of The 9513 gave A Woman Needs 3 and 1/2 stars, describing her favorably as a "notch above Nashville’s clutch of pretty blondes" with a "spicy southern twang." He also spoke positively of the production and the guest appearances of Vince Gill's harmony vocals (on "Homemade Love") and Keith Urban's guitar playing (on "Boy Like Me") as well as Carrie Underwood's co-writing (on "Good Enough for Me").

== Track listing ==
No.	Title	Writer(s)	Length
1.	"A Woman Needs"	Jessica Harp; Jerry Flowers; Jason Mowery	3:40
2.	"Boy Like Me"	Flowers	3:47
3.	"Homemade Love" (featuring Vince Gill)	Harp; Darrell Scott	3:52
4.	"Letting Go"	Harp; Tommy Lee James	3:52
5.	"More to This Than You"	Harp; Flowers	3:37
6.	"Breakup Song"	Harp; Flowers; Mowery	3:50
7.	"Love Letter"	Harp; Mowery; Bruce Wallace	3:41
8.	"Lonely Anywhere"	Morgane Hayes; Jess Leary; Liz Rose	3:31
9.	"Follow That Train"	Harp; Marcus Hummon; Darrell Scott	3:52
10.	"Someone Else's Life"	Harp; Flowers; Mowery	4:07
11.	"Good Enough for Me"	Luke Laird; Hillary Lindsey; Carrie Underwood	3:20
Total length:			41:09

== Chart performance ==
A Woman Needs debuted at #31 on the U.S. Billboard Top Country Albums chart, selling 2,918 copies in its first week.

Chart (2010)	Peak position
U.S. Billboard Top Country Albums	31
U.S. Billboard Top Heatseekers	7
