= Leave the Pieces =

2006 single by the Wreckers

Single by The Wreckers

from the album Stand Still, Look Pretty
- Released: February 7, 2006
- Genre: Country
- Length: 3:31
- Label: Maverick
- Songwriters: Billy Austin; Jennifer Hanson
- Producers: Michelle Branch; John Shanks

The Wreckers singles chronology
"I'm Feeling You" (2005)	"Leave the Pieces" (2006)	"My, Oh My" (2006)

"Leave the Pieces" is a song written by Jennifer Hanson and Billy Austin, and recorded by American country music duo The Wreckers for their debut album Stand Still, Look Pretty for which it served as lead single with a February 7, 2006 release. Though it was the first single from their first album, it was The Wreckers' third single overall: they had released two singles in 2005, "The Good Kind", which peaked at #115, and "I'm Feeling You", in collaboration with Santana, which peaked at #55.

"Leave the Pieces" entered the U.S. Billboard Hot 100 at number 68, eventually reaching number 34 on the Hot 100. The song also hit number 1 on Billboard's Hot Country Songs chart. It was the first track by a first-time charting duo to top the Billboard country music chart since 1991, and the first by a female duo since 1953. Michelle Branch said of the song's success, "To see our hard work in getting this project off the ground result in my first number-one as an artist could not be more meaningful", while Jessica Harp said "It's an amazing feeling to have our debut single go number one, especially getting to share it with my dear friend. The fact that we've achieved such success is something I can't even comprehend yet. I just know that the stars have aligned, and it feels good to be a Wrecker."

The song has sold 1,155,000 copies in the United States as of November 2019.

== Critical reception ==
In December 2006, The Wreckers were nominated for a Grammy Award for "Best Country Performance by a Duo or Group with Vocal" for "Leave the Pieces."

== Commercial performance ==
The song debuted on the Billboard Hot Country Songs chart at No. 53 for the week of April 15, 2006. It reached No. 1 on the chart dated September 9, 2006. The song was certified Gold by the RIAA on February 22, 2008. It reached over a million in sales by April 2013, and has sold 1,155,000 copies in the United States as of November 2019.

== Music video ==
A music video was released on March 30, 2006, directed by Trey Fanjoy. The video features a girl (played by Harp) who is leaving her boyfriend (played by actor Nick Steele), because he is on the fence about their relationship. Harp packs all her clothes and her friend, played by Branch, comes and picks her up. The video includes shots of the women performing on a porch and in/beside an old car, and it topped CMT's Top Twenty Countdown for two consecutive weeks in August 2006.

== Film and television appearances ==
"Leave the Pieces" was used in the 2011 episode "Homecoming and Coming Home" of Hart of Dixie.

== Formats and track listings ==
Australian CD single

1. "Leave the Pieces" (Pop Edit)
2. "My, Oh My" (Demo Version)
3. "Stand Still, Look Pretty"

== Cover versions ==
Holly Tucker and The Swon Brothers performed the song on The Voice (U.S. season 4) during the elimination episode of the 5th week of the live shows.

Hanna Ashbrook and Summer Schappell covered the song on The Voice (U.S. season 9) during the Battles round.

== Charts ==
=== Weekly charts ===
Weekly chart performance for "Leave the Pieces"
Chart (2006)	Peak position
Australia (ARIA)	73
Canada Country (Billboard)	1
US Billboard Hot 100	34
US Hot Country Songs (Billboard)	1
US Adult Pop Airplay (Billboard)	19

=== Year-end charts ===
Year-end chart performance for "Leave the Pieces"
Chart (2006)	Position
US Country Songs (Billboard)	8

== Certifications ==
Region	Certification	Certified units/sales
United States (RIAA)	Gold	1,155,000
