= Scott Speer =

American filmmaker (born 1982)

- Born: June 5, 1982 (age 44); San Diego, California, U.S.
- Occupations: Director; novelist
- Years active: 2005–present

Scott Speer (born June 5, 1982) is an American director and novelist.

== Life and career ==
Speer was born in San Diego, California. At age 23, he was signed with HSI Productions, and in 2006 Speer received the MVPA Award for Directorial Debut of the Year for the music video of "Stars" by Switchfoot.

In 2007 he won his first MTV Video Music Awards Latin America in Mexico, for his work with "Bella Traicion" by the Mexican pop sensation Belinda. In June 2007, he directed a three-part video series for Ashley Tisdale. These videos included "He Said She Said", "Not Like That" and "Suddenly" released on her DVD There's Something About Ashley. In 2009, he again directed music videos for Tisdale for "It's Alright, It's OK" and "Crank It Up" from her album Guilty Pleasure. He also had an on-and-off dating relationship with Tisdale from 2009 to 2012.

In addition to directing, Speer produced and second unit directed the feature film The Beat, an official selection of the 2003 Sundance Film Festival, and remains deeply involved in independent films. In 2010 Scott directed The LXD episode "Duet".

In 2012, he directed Step Up Revolution (2012), his feature film directing debut.

In April 2012, Speer released a young adult novel called Immortal City, about a world in which celebrity culture revolves around supernatural beings, specifically guardian angels.

In April 2013, Speer released a book called Natural Born Angel. He also wrote the preceding novel Immortal City (2012) and concluded the trilogy with Battle Angel in 2014. In 2015 he filmed the highly rated exorcism short film Realm, which was also later made into a full-length film.

== Legal issues ==
In April 2019, Speer was arrested in Los Angeles following an alleged domestic dispute at his Hollywood Hills residence that resulted in arson charges. He was released on a $250,000 bond.

In May 2019, Speer’s wife filed for divorce in Los Angeles County Superior Court, according to court records and contemporaneous reporting.

In November 2020, Speer was sentenced to 52 weeks of domestic violence counseling, 45 days of community labor, and five years of probation after pleading no contest to reduced charges in the 2019 domestic violence case. The reduction included dropping the arson charge.

== Filmography ==
=== Music videos ===
2005

- Switchfoot - "Stars"

2006

- Five Speed - "The Mess"
- Teddy Geiger - "For You I Will (Confidence)"
- Eric Church - "How 'Bout You"
- Sanctus Real - "I'm Not Alright"
- Paris Hilton - "Nothing In This World"
- Belinda - "Ni Freud, Ni Tu Mamá"

2007

- Eric Church - "Guys Like Me"
- Belinda - "Bella Traición"
- Belinda - "Luz Sin Gravedad" (co-directed with Belinda)
- Ashley Tisdale - "He Said She Said"
- Ashley Tisdale - "Suddenly"
- Ashley Tisdale - "Not Like That"
- The Veronicas - "Hook Me Up"
- Belinda - "If We Were"
- Aly & AJ - "Like Whoa"
- Brandi Carlile - "The Story"
- Erika Jayne - "Stars"

2008

- Alexander Kogan - "I Will"
- Belinda - "See a Little Light"
- Luigi Masi - "The Look"
- Big Boi featuring Andre 3000 and Raekwon - "Royal Flush"
- Boys Like Girls - "Catch Me If You Can"
- Clique Girlz - "Then I Woke Up"
- Jordin Sparks - "Tattoo" (Second version)
- Paula Abdul - "Dance Like There's No Tomorrow" (co-directed with Abdul)
- David Archuleta - "A Little Too Not Over You"
- Blake Shelton - "She Wouldn't Be Gone"

2009

- Jessica Harp - "Boy Like Me"
- Ashley Tisdale - "It's Alright, It's OK"
- V Factory - "Love Struck"
- Ashley Tisdale - "Crank It Up"
- Parachute - "Under Control"

2010

- Charice featuring Iyaz - "Pyramid"
- Jason Derulo - "Ridin' Solo"
- Orianthi - "Courage"

=== Feature films ===
- The Beat (2003) (producer, second unit director)
- Step Up Revolution (2012) (director)
- Step Up: All In (2014) (executive producer)
- Midnight Sun (2018) (director)
- Status Update (2018) (director)
- I Still See You (2018) (director)
- Endless (2020) (director)

=== Television ===
- Finding Carter (2014) (director)
- Scream (2016) (director)

== Awards and nominations ==
Year	Award	Category	Motive	Result
2006	MVPA Award	Directorial Debut of the Year	Switchfoot - "Stars"	Won
2007	Premios Lo Nuestro	"Video of the Year"	Belinda - "Ni Freud Ni Tu Mama"	Nominated
2007	MTV Video Music Awards Latin America	"Video of the Year"	Belinda - "Bella Traición"	Won
2007	OVMALA	"Best Lighting"	Belinda - "Luz Sin Gravedad"	Won
2007	OVMALA	"Best Costume in a Video (Women)"	Belinda - "Bella Traición"	Nominated
2007	OVMALA	"Best Female Video"	Belinda - "Luz Sin Gravedad"	Won

== Bibliography ==
- 2012: Immortal City
- 2013: Natural Born Angel
- 2014: Battle Angel
