= Jessica Harp =

American country musician (born 1982)

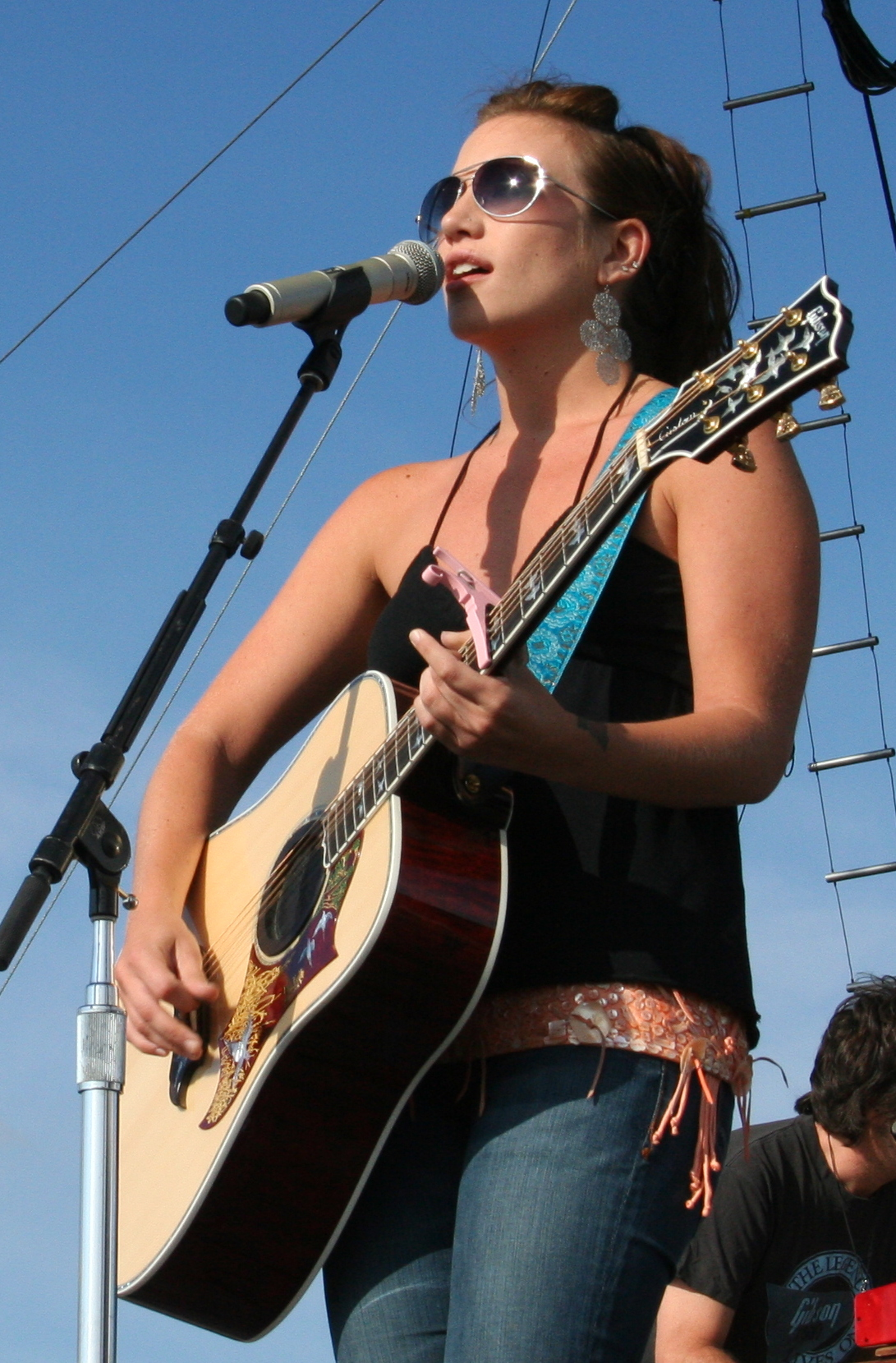
- Harp performing as part of The Wreckers in 2007

Background information
- Born: Jessica Leigh Harp; February 3, 1982 (age 44); Kansas City, Missouri, U.S.
- Genre: Country
- Occupations: Singer; musician; songwriter
- Instruments: Vocals; guitar
- Years active: 2002–2010
- Formerly of: The Wreckers
- Website: jessicaharp.net

Jessica Leigh Harp (born February 3, 1982) is an American songwriter and former country artist from Kansas City, Missouri. Between 2005 and 2007, Harp and Michelle Branch recorded and performed as The Wreckers, a duo that topped the country charts in 2006 with the Grammy-nominated "Leave the Pieces". After The Wreckers disbanded, Harp began a solo career on Warner Bros. Records, the same label to which The Wreckers were signed. Her solo second album single, "Boy Like Me", debuted in March 2009 and was a top 30 hit on the U.S. Billboard Hot Country Songs chart. It was followed by her second album, A Woman Needs, in March 2010.

== Biography ==
Jessica Harp grew up with her parents and her sister, Annie, in Kansas City, Missouri. She began singing when she was 3, wrote lyrics when she was 8, and picked up guitar at 13. In 2002, she pursued a solo career in music, releasing her independent album, Preface. She then worked as a backup vocalist for various country acts.

=== 2005–2007: The Wreckers ===
She provided backing vocals for her long-time friend Michelle Branch's album, Hotel Paper. After working together, Harp joined up with Branch in 2005 to form a country duo, known as The Wreckers, whose song "The Good Kind" was featured on One Tree Hill and its soundtrack. The group's debut country single, "Leave the Pieces", was released in February 2006. It was followed by their debut album, Stand Still, Look Pretty, which was released on May 23, 2006. "Leave the Pieces" reached Number One on the U.S. Billboard Hot Country Songs chart in September 2006. The album produced two additional singles in "My, Oh My" (a Top 10 hit) and "Tennessee" and was certified Gold by the RIAA for reaching sales of over 500,000.

Harp appeared on the very first live game broadcast by the NFL Network on November 23, 2006, to sing the American national anthem before the Thanksgiving Day game between her hometown Kansas City Chiefs and the Denver Broncos. They later performed the National Anthem at the 55th Annual NHL All-Star Game on January 24, 2007.

Despite the success of their Number One debut single, album sales, and a nomination for the 2007 Grammy Awards for Best Country Performance by a Duo or Group with Vocal for the song "Leave the Pieces", both Harp and Branch announced in August 2007 that they were putting The Wreckers on hold, while both went forward with solo albums. This was announced on the band's official message board, which was later closed.

=== 2008–2010: A Woman Needs ===
On February 4, 2008, she married The Wreckers' fiddle player Jason Mowery. She started recording her second solo country album for Warner Bros. Nashville in July 2008 and announced in January 2009 that it would be titled A Woman Needs. Songwriter Jerry Flowers produced the album and co-wrote several of the songs. The lead-off single, "Boy Like Me," was released to country radio on March 9, 2009. It became her first Top 30 country hit, reaching a peak of No. 30 in June 2009. The album's second single, the title track, was released to radio on January 19, 2010, and the music video was filmed on November 19, 2009. On March 2, 2010, Harp announced that she would retire as a recording artist to focus on becoming a full-time songwriter. Warner Bros. Records released her second album digitally on March 16, 2010. Over a year and a half later, on October 11, 2011, Harp announced on Twitter that Warner Bros. released her from her contract and that she would record music again, either independently or with a label.

== Discography ==
Jessica Harp discography
- Studio albums: 2
- Singles: 2
- Music videos: 2

=== Studio albums ===
Title	Album details	Peak chart positions	
Title	Album details	US Country	US Heat
Preface	Release date: March 1, 2002; Label: self-released	—	—
A Woman Needs	Release date: March 16, 2010; Label: Warner Bros. Nashville	31	7
"—" denotes releases that did not chart

=== Singles ===
Year	Single	Peak positions	Album
Year	Single	US Country	Album
2009	"Boy Like Me"	30	A Woman Needs
2010	"A Woman Needs"	56	A Woman Needs

=== Music videos ===
Year	Video	Director
2009	"Boy Like Me"	Scott Speer
2010	"A Woman Needs"	Kristin Barlowe

== Awards ==
Year	Organization	Award	Result
2006	Country Music Association	Vocal Duo of the Year (as The Wreckers)	Nominated
2006	Academy of Country Music	Top New Vocal Duo or Group (as The Wreckers)	Nominated
2006	Academy of Country Music	Top Vocal Duo (as The Wreckers)	Nominated
2007	Grammy Awards	Best Country Performance by a Duo or Group with Vocal — ("Leave the Pieces" as The Wreckers)	Nominated
2007	Music Row Awards	Major Label Breakout Artist of the Year (as The Wreckers)	Won
2007	R&R Readers' Poll	Best New Performer (as The Wreckers)	Won
2007	Country Music Association	Vocal Duo of the Year (as The Wreckers)	Nominated
2007	Academy of Country Music	Top New Vocal Duo or Group (as The Wreckers)	Nominated
2008	Country Music Association	Vocal Duo of the Year (as The Wreckers)	Nominated
