= Stand Still, Look Pretty =

Studio album by the Wreckers
- Released: May 23, 2006 (U.S.)
- Recorded: October 18, 2004 – July 28, 2005
- Genre: Country
- Length: 44:37
- Label: Maverick/Warner Bros. Nashville
- Producer: Michelle Branch; Rick Depoli; John Leventhal; John Shanks; Paul Worley

Singles from Stand Still, Look Pretty
- 1. "Leave the Pieces" Released: February 7, 2006; 2. "My, Oh My" Released: September 2006; 3. "Tennessee" Released: March 17, 2007

Professional ratings
Aggregate scores
Source	Rating
Metacritic	(69/100)
Review scores
Source	Rating
About.com	5/5 stars
AllMusic	4/5 stars
Blender	3/5 stars
E! Online	C
Entertainment Weekly	B−
People	3/4 stars
Plugged In (publication)	(mixed)
Slant Magazine	2/5 stars
Stylus Magazine	B

Stand Still, Look Pretty is the only studio album by the Wreckers, a country pop duo consisting of solo artists Michelle Branch and Jessica Harp. It was released in the United States on May 23, 2006, and has been released in other countries.

The album debuted at number fourteen on the U.S. Billboard 200 with 44,000 copies sold in its first week. In September 2006, the RIAA certified Stand Still, Look Pretty Gold for shipments to retailers of 500,000 copies. The album sold 853,000 copies in the U.S. up to March 2012.

The first single, "Leave the Pieces", peaked at number 34 on the U.S. Billboard Hot 100 and topped the Hot Country Songs chart. In December 2006, the Wreckers were nominated for a Grammy Award for Best Country Performance by a Duo or Group with Vocal for the song. The second single, "My, Oh My", reached number 87 on the Hot 100 and the Top Ten on the Hot Country Songs chart. The third single, "Tennessee", reached number 33 on the Hot Country Songs chart. "Cigarettes" was originally planned as the fourth single, but was canceled due to the band's separation. Another track, "The Good Kind", was featured on the teen soap opera One Tree Hill in early 2005, after which it hit number 15 on the Bubbling Under Hot 100 Singles chart.

== Track listing ==
No.	Title	Writer(s)	Length
1.	"Leave the Pieces"	Billy Austin, Jennifer Hanson	3:31
2.	"Way Back Home"	Michelle Branch, Jessica Harp	3:18
3.	"The Good Kind"	Branch, Harp	3:45
4.	"Tennessee"	Harp	4:21
5.	"My, Oh My"	Branch, Harp, Wayne Kirkpatrick, Josh Leo	3:30
6.	"Stand Still, Look Pretty"	Branch, Harp	2:46
7.	"Cigarettes"	Harp	3:18
8.	"Hard to Love You"	Branch, John Leventhal	3:52
9.	"Lay Me Down"	Branch, Harp, Greg Wells	3:35
10.	"One More Girl"	Patty Griffin	5:18
11.	"Rain"	Branch	4:05
12.	"Crazy People"	Branch, Harp	3:09

Australian bonus tracks
No.	Title	Writer(s)	Length
13.	"Leave the Pieces" (pop edit)	Austin, Hanson	3:30

DVD bonus tracks
No.	Title	Writer(s)	Length
13.	"Tennessee" (Acoustic Version)	Harp	4:36

DVD
No.	Title	Length
1.	"Leave the Pieces" (video)	3:27
2.	"Leave the Pieces" (making of the video)	16:14

== Personnel ==
Compiled from liner notes.

=== Musicians ===
The Wreckers

- Michelle Branch – vocals, harmony vocals, acoustic guitar
- Jessica Harp – vocals, harmony vocals, acoustic guitar

Additional musicians

"Leave the Pieces"

- John Shanks – keyboards, guitars, mandolin, banjo
- Teddy Landau – bass
- Abe Laboriel Jr. – drums
- Sid Page – fiddle

Tracks 2–4 & 6–12

- Rick Depofi – keyboards, percussion, horns
- John Leventhal – keyboards, guitars, banjo, mandolin, bass, percussion
- Teddy Landau – bass
- Charley Drayton – drums
- Rich Pagano – drums
- Shawn Pelton – drums
- Larry Campbell – fiddle

"My, Oh My"

- Michael Rojas – Hammond B3 organ
- Audley Freed – electric guitars
- Paul Worley – electric guitars
- Biff Watson – National guitar
- Randy Kohrs – dobro
- Stuart Duncan – fiddle, mandolin
- Craig Young – bass
- Shannon Forrest – drums

=== Production ===
- Kevin Williamson – A&R
- Michelle Branch – producer (1)
- John Shanks – producer (1), mixing (1)
- John Leventhal – producer (2–4, 6–12), recording (2–4, 6–12)
- Rick Depofi – co-producer (2–4, 6–12), recording (2–4, 6–12)
- Paul Worley – producer (5)
- Jeff Rothschild – mixing (1)
- Mike Shipley – mixing (2–4, 7–9, 11)
- Clarke Schleicher – recording (5), mixing (5)
- Roger Moutenot – mixing (6, 10, 12)
- Lars Fox – additional engineer (1)
- Jorge Valez – recording assistant (2–4, 6–12)
- Chris Roth – assistant engineer (2–4, 7–9, 11)
- John Baldwin – assistant engineer (5)
- Brent Kaye – assistant engineer (5)
- David Robinson – assistant engineer (5)
- Matt Shane – assistant engineer (6, 10, 12)
- Stephen Marcussen – mastering at Marcussen Mastering (Hollywood, California)
- Shari Sutcliffe – production coordinator (1), contractor (1)
- Jill Dell'Abate – production coordinator (2–4, 6–12)
- Paige Connors – production coordinator (5)
- !Vive El Cinco! – creative direction, design
- Michael Muller – cover and interior photography
- Nick Spanos – additional photography
- Quattro – scenic photography
- Stuart Dill – management
- Jeff Rabhan – management

== Chart performance ==
=== Weekly charts ===
Chart (2006)	Peak position
Canadian Albums (Nielsen SoundScan)	91
UK Country Albums (OCC)	11
US Billboard 200	14
US Top Country Albums (Billboard)	4

=== Year-end charts ===
Chart (2006)	Position
US Billboard 200	136
US Top Country Albums (Billboard)	29

Chart (2007)	Position
US Billboard 200	173
US Top Country Albums (Billboard)	31

=== Singles ===
Year	Single	Peak chart positions			
Year	Single	US Country	US	US Pop	US Adult
2006	"Leave the Pieces"	1	34	54	19
2006	"My, Oh My"	9	87	—	—
2007	"Tennessee"	33	—	—	—
"—" denotes releases that did not chart

== Certifications ==
Region	Certification	Certified units/sales
United States (RIAA)	Gold	853,000
