= The Dark Side of the Moonnezz =

Studio album by Tony Tammaro
- Released: 2005
- Recorded: 2003–2005 in Naples, Italy
- Genre: Pop, Neapolitan song
- Producer: Tony Tammaro

Tony Tammaro chronology
Monnezzarium (1997)	The Dark Side of the Moonnezz (2005)	Yes I Cant (2010)

The Dark Side of the Moonnezz is the sixth studio album by Italian parody singer-songwriter Tony Tammaro. It is the last after a long break for studio recording of eight years, during which the singer performed in tours.

This concept album explores the flaws and merits of the Neapolitan society starting from the problem of garbage disposal and having a journey through love, childhood, cellphone addiction, music piracy, money, government failures, generational conflicts and annihilation of the individuals in the mass. The Dark Side of the Moonezz has several direct allusions and tributes to Pink Floyd's discography from the main themes of The Dark Side of the Moon to Wish You Were Here.

== Track listing ==
All tracks written and composed by Tony Tammaro

  - Non chiamarmi Annarella (3:34)
  - Scarication telephone (3:07)
  - Questione di gel (3:35)
  - Amanti (3:52)
  - 'A munnezza d'a gente (4:19)
  - Saturday (2:58)
  - Io sto cu' tte (2:58)
  - 'O feeling (1:45)
  - Pe' salvà 'o cellulare (2:43)
  - Supersantos (4:23)
  - Amico che compri i miei dischi (3:00)
  - Trucida (2:59)
