= My, Oh My (The Wreckers song) =

Single by The Wreckers

from the album Stand Still, Look Pretty
- Released: September 23, 2006
- Genre: Country
- Length: 3:31
- Label: Maverick
- Songwriters: Michelle Branch; Jessica Harp; Wayne Kirkpatrick; Josh Leo
- Producer: Paul Worley

The Wreckers singles chronology
"Leave the Pieces" (2006)	"My, Oh My" (2006)	"Tennessee" (2007)

"My, Oh My" is a song written by Wayne Kirkpatrick, Josh Leo, and co-written and recorded by American country music duo The Wreckers. It was released on September 23, 2006, as the second single from their debut album Stand Still, Look Pretty.

== Content ==
"My, Oh My" is a mid-tempo song with a traditional production featuring banjo, fiddle, and cowbell. The song's narrator notices how everything changes so rapidly, and remembers when there was empty land where there are now parking lots and stores.

The song is performed completely in duet form by both members of The Wreckers (Branch and Harp), as opposed to other songs where they alternate between verses ("Leave the Pieces") or one member has lead vocals on a certain song (Harp on "Tennessee").

== Music video ==
A music video was released on October 5, 2006, directed by Paul Boyd, features Jessica Harp and Michelle Branch riding in a horse-drawn carriage. They pick up a banker with a briefcase full of cash. Then they stage a robbery of the cash with their gang/band. When the police show up they pretend to be innocents and slowly slip away with the cash. It ends with the whole group posing for a photo. The video is done old western style. It was filmed in the Mojave Desert in California.

== Chart performance ==
"My, Oh My" debuted at number 56 on the Billboard Hot Country Songs chart for the week of September 23, 2006. In January 2007, the song also debuted on the Billboard Hot 100 at number 94.

Chart (2006–2007)	Peak position
Canada Country (Billboard)	6
US Hot Country Songs (Billboard)	9
US Billboard Hot 100	87
