= Tutto è possibile (Finley album) =

Studio album by Finley
- Released: 31 March 2006
- Genre: Pop-punk
- Length: 69:41
- Label: EMI
- Producer: Claudio Cecchetto

Finley chronology
Tutto è possibile (2006)	Adrenalina (2007)

Singles from Tutto è possibile
- 1. "Tutto è possibile" Released: 15 September 2005; 2. "Diventerai una star" Released: 5 May 2006; 3. "Dentro alla scatola" Released: 25 July 2006; 4. "Sole di settembre" Released: 23 October 2006; 5. "Fumo e cenere" Released: 23 October 2006

Tutto è possibile is the debut album studio by Italian pop rock band Finley, released on 31 March 2006.

In November 2006, a Special Edition Hard Pop version of the album was released, containing three cover songs and a DVD to celebrate the group's winning as Best Italian act at the MTV Europe Music Awards.

Tutto è possibile sold over 130,000 copies in 2006.

== Track listing ==
All tracks are written by Marco Pedretti, Carmine Ruggiero, Stefano Mantegazza and Danilo Calvio.

Tutto è possibile
No.	Title	Length
1.	"Tutto è possibile"	3:27
2.	"Sole di settembre"	3:42
3.	"Fumo e cenere"	3:13
4.	"Addio"	2:54
5.	"Diventerai una star"	3:06
6.	"Per sempre"	3:45
7.	"Scegli me"	3:36
8.	"Sirene"	3:29
9.	"Run away (no way out)"	3:11
10.	"Make up your own mind"	3:26
11.	"Ray of light"	3:42
12.	"Grief"	3:29
13.	"Dollars & car"	3:09
14.	"Goodnight"	3:50
15.	"In my arms again"	3:36
16.	"Siren"	3:44
Total length:		69:41

== Band members ==
- Marco Pedretti - lead vocals
- Carmine Ruggiero - electric lead guitar and backing vocals
- Stefano Mantegazza - electric bass guitar and backing vocals
- Danilo Calvio - drum kit and backing vocals

== Charts ==
=== Weekly charts ===
Weekly chart performance for Tutto è possibile
Chart (2006)	Peak position
Italian Albums (FIMI)	4

=== Year-end charts ===
Year-end chart performance for Tutto è possibile
Chart (2006)	Position
Italian Albums (FIMI)	17
