= Tutto è possibile (song) =

Single by Finley

from the album Tutto è possibile
- Released: 25 November 2005
- Recorded: 2005
- Genre: Pop-punk
- Length: 3:24
- Label: EMI
- Producer: Claudio Cecchetto

Finley singles chronology
"Tutto è possibile" (2005)	"Diventerai una star" (2006)

Music video
- "Tutto è possibile" on YouTube

"Tutto è possibile" is the debut single by Italian pop rock band Finley. It was released on 25 November 2005 as the first single of the band's debut album Tutto è possibile.

The song was written by the band and was produced by Claudio Cecchetto. It peaked at number 7 on the Italian singles chart.

== Music video ==
The official music video for "Tutto è possibile" was directed by Gaetano Morbioli.

== Track listing ==
1. "Tutto è possibile"
2. "Make Up Your Own Mind"
3. "Grief"

== Personnel ==
- Marco Pedretti – lead vocals
- Carmine Ruggiero – guitars, vocals
- Stefano Mantegazza – bass, vocals
- Danilo Calvio – drums, vocals

== Charts ==
Weekly chart performance for "Tutto è possibile"
Chart (2005–2006)	Peak position
Italy (FIMI)	7
