= Finley (band) =

Italian rock band

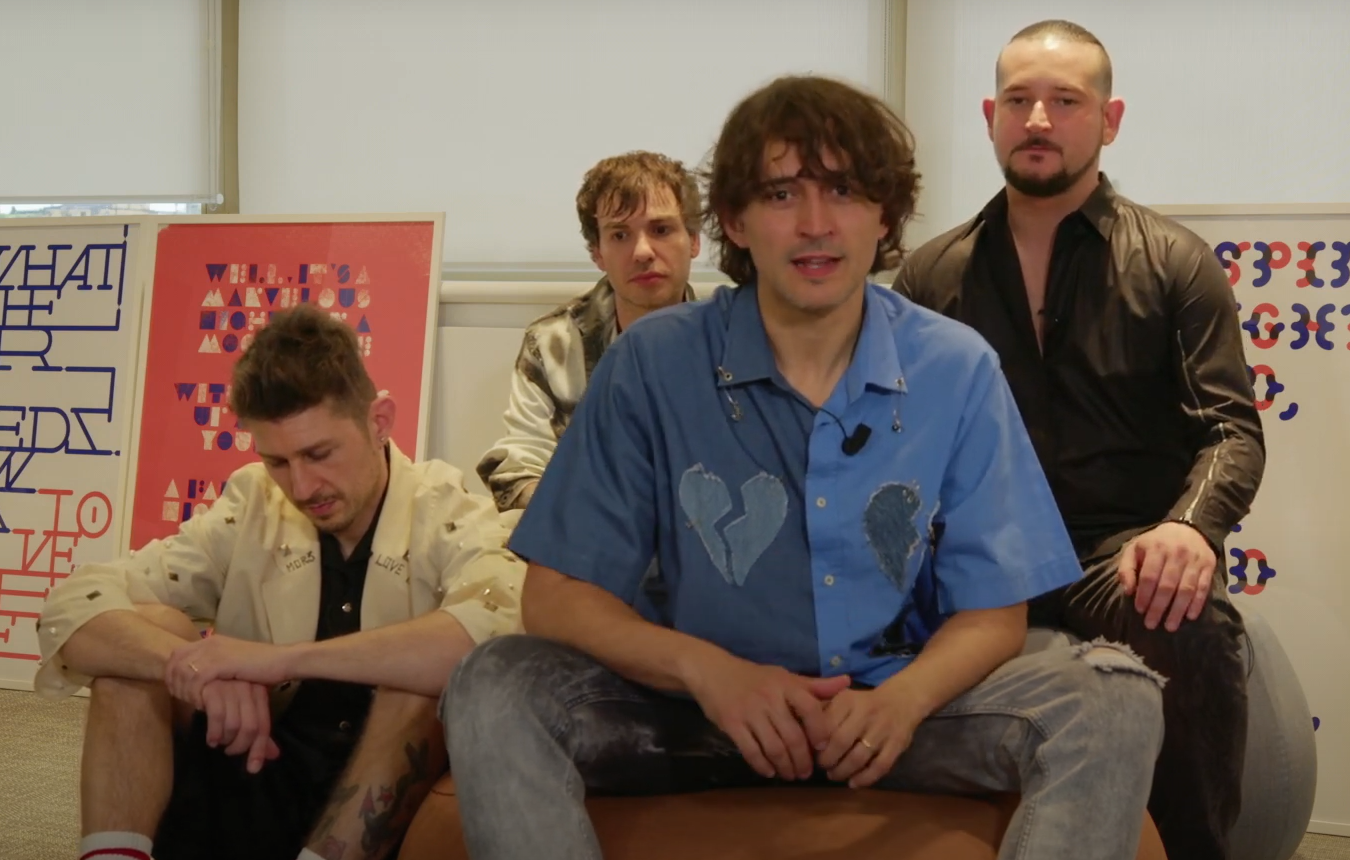
- Finley in 2024

Background information
- Origin: Legnano, Lombardy, Italy
- Genres: Pop punk; alternative rock; punk rock; pop rock
- Years active: 2002–present
- Labels: Capitol; EMI; Gruppo Randa; Sony
- Members: Marco Pedretti; Carmine Ruggiero; Danilo Calvio; Ivan Moro
- Past members: Stefano Mantegazza
- Website: www.finley.it

Finley is an Italian rock band formed in Legnano, Lombardy, Italy in 2002.

Pedro (vocals), Ka (guitars), Dani (drums) and Ivan (bass) have released five studio albums. They write, compose and sing their own lyrics and music which sound powerful with a strong, melodic impact.

Finley has sold over 1,300,000 records in Italy and they have won many awards, including two "Best Italian Act" at MTV Europe Music Awards: the first one in 2006 (Copenhagen) and the second one in 2008 (Liverpool) becoming, along with Subsonica, the most award-winning Italian band. The band took its name from NBA star Michael Finley.

== Career ==
=== Formation and early years (2002–2004) ===
Finley was formed in 2002 in Legnano under the name "Junkies": the band consists of school friends with a passion for the same kind of music. Pedro, Ka, Dani and Ste decided to start a band, immediately focusing on writing their own songs. Their first rehearsal venue was the little cellar of a rock club they attended on week-ends.

They recorded their first EP titled "Simply a demo" in 2002 and started playing in some smaller Legnano clubs and at high school parties. In 2003 the members change the band's name from "Junkies" to "Finley", inspired from the NBA player Michael Finley who was, at that time, the basketball star of the Dallas Mavericks. That year they self produce their first video for "Make up your own mind", directed by their friend, Marco Lamanna.

=== Claudio Cecchetto and Tutto è possibile (2005–2006) ===
Thanks to their first single "Everything Is Possibile" the band caught the attention of Italy's most famous producer Claudio Cecchetto, founder of Radio Deejay (one of the most important radio stations in Italy) and producer of some of the most known Italian artists in recent years: Jovanotti, 883 and many others. Finley started working with him and played as the opening act for Max Pezzali shows in Milan and Rome, before audiences of 20.000 people.

In 2005 Claudio Cecchetto produced Finley's first single "Tutto è possibile", the Italian language version of "Everything Is possible". The debut of the single occurred in November 2005 on Mtv Italy. A few days after that, the band unexpectedly showed up under Mtv Trl studios during the live recording of the program, showing at the cameras a poster that displays the writing "Thank you!". As time goes by Finley became the representative band for Mtv and, in addition to this, the four guys worked for a certain period as hosts for Mtv Trl and other Mtv programs.

The band signs a contract with EMI/Capitol Italy and publishes its first studio album Tutto è possibile, recorded and mixed by their friend and artistic producer Daniele Persoglio, and released on 31 March 2006. The album has a fresh and new sound in Italian soundscape and gets much attention: at this point a long tour started and, day by day, an increasing number of people showed up at the concerts and filled the clubs where the band performs.

In summer Finley release the second single "Diventerai una star" thanks to which the album slowly rises up the Italian charts and became a platinum record with over 80,000 copies sold. The success leads the band on some big stages: Coca-Cola live@Mtv, where the band opens Pink's show, and Heineken Jammin Festival where Finley share the stage with Depeche Mode and Morrissey.

During a rehearsal session in one of the biggest studios in Milan the guys meet Mondo Marcio, a new Italian rapper who has recently published his first record. Finley recorded a rock version of his hit titled "Dentro alla scatola": this featuring brings the single at the top of all TVs and radios charts. To crown it all, Mtv gives the band a nomination as Best Italian Act at the MTV Europe Music Awards 2006, along with artists such as Lacuna Coil, Tiziano Ferro, and Jovanotti.

On 27 November 2006 Finley won the award. A few days after that, the band released a ri-edition of its first record in a cd-DVD version, which became a double platinum record selling over 160,000 copies. The tour is sold out and two more singles are released on winter: "Sole di settembre" and "Fumo e cenere". Finley tours Italy non-stop all year round, performing over 100 shows during 2006. The last concert of this tour takes place in a club called "Alcatraz" in Milan, where tickets sold out in just a few hours.

=== Adrenalina and European tour (2007–2008) ===
During the first few months of 2007 the band dedicated itself to the writing of the second studio album Adrenalina. The album, produced by Claudio Cecchetto and EMI/Capitol, is registered and mixed by Michele Canova, a sound engineer and artistic producer who works with artists such as Tiziano Ferro and Eros Ramazzotti. Adrenalina sees the light on June 15, 2007 and debuts at number two in Italy, drag by the homonymous single.

In summer a new tour starts and the band is called to play in the most important European festivals. They played at Rock Am Ring and Rock Im Park festivals in Germany, sharing the stage with Korn, Velvet Revolver, Good Charlotte, Paolo Nutini and The Kooks, in Hyde Park, London, for the Wireless Festival with The White Stripes, Air, Queens of the Stone Age and in Sweden for the Pier Pressure, playing as opening act for My Chemical Romance and Avril Lavigne.

Mtv Italy followed the band on this tour in order to create a video-documentary to broadcast on TV in the following weeks. Italian tour goes ahead too and, at the end of summer, Finley played at the "MTV day", the tenth anniversary of MTV Italy, which took place in Rome in front of over 70,000 people.

The second single from Adrenalina titled "Domani" is released in October and the album becomes a gold record. In 2008 Finley had been called to join the Sanremo Music Festival's cast with the song "Ricordi". The English version of the song titled "Your Hero" is recorded with the famous Latin-American singer Belinda, nominated in 2004 for the Best female album at Billboard Latin Music Awards and in 2005 as best pop artist at MTV Video Music Awards Latin America. During this seven-day festival, the band released "Adrenalina 2", an extended version of "Adrenalina" that charted and became the most sold record of that month.

Adrenalina reaches the platinum records status and in May 2008 a new tour starts. In autumn Finley received another nomination for the MTV Europe Music Awards and they won the Best Italian Act for the second time in November.

=== Band at work and Fuori (2009–2011) ===
Finley is recognized as a pioneer of a new kind of rock in Italy, has paved the way for many bands inspired by their sound. During the writing of their third album, the band felt the need to experiment with a new sound, and turned to their long-term friend and artistic producer Daniele Persoglio, who recorded their first record. Finley went back into the studio and after a few months released a new EP titled "Band at work" whose first single "Gruppo Randa" became a very important song for the band. Gruppo randa becomes a symbol, an anthem for all the fans that, under the name of "Randa", identified themselves in a movement, a philosophy of life.

Finley went through various types of sounds and different contents in the lyrics comparing them to the first two album's songs. They create a sort of transition album that is going, from here on, to change their entire sound and the way the band writes and compose. This third studio album is titled "Fuori!" and is published on 30 March 2010 with Claudio Cecchetto, Pierpaolo Peroni and EMI/Capitol, recorded and arranged by Marco Barusso and Daniele Persoglio and mixed by Marco Barusso.

The album debuted at nine in Italy and the band launches it through a film-clip, a short film made by the five singles' videos connected each other's by the same story. The five songs are "Fuori!", "Un'altra come te", "Il tempo di un minuto", "In orbita" and "Meglio di noi non-c'è niente".

In September the band has been asked from Disney to reinterpret the soundtrack for “Camp Rock 2: The Final Jam", they write "Per la vita che verrà", the Italian version of "I wouldn't change a thing", the original song by Demi Lovato and Joe Jonas.

In the second half of 2010, two significant facts occur: at first Ste, the bass player, decided to leave the band to start his personal new projects. Daniele Persoglio temporary took his place as bass player.

The second fact is the encounter with Edoardo Bennato, the progenitor in the sixties/seventies of rock music in Italy. The first time that the band and him met each other was backstage at a concert: they then decided to go together on stage and to play together their hits: “Le ragazze fanno grandi sogni” and "Fumo e cenere". A strong sinergy immediately born between them and leaves a deep mark in the artistic path of the band. Edoardo Bennato asked Finley to take part in his new live DVD “Mtv Classic Storytellers”, with many other important Italian artists: Roy Paci, Giuliano Palma & the Bluebeaters and Morgan.

In 2011 Finley took part also to the CD soundtrack for the Fox animation movie "Rio", with the song "Carnevale". In September the band decide to have a long break in order to enter the studio and write the new songs for the fourth album with no pressure and with all the time they needed. During this period they created a new way to keep in contact and interact with the fans: “Timeline”. This is a free e-diary written and published on the band website day by day where the members write their thoughts, considerations, stories, and everything about the creation of their new songs and the life in the studio. The diary has a great success and became a video diary after some months. In the second episode of this video diary the band announced that the fourth album will be recorded and mixed by Guido Style, frontman of the rock'n'roll band The Styles, famous producer and guitarist who plays with big Italian stars J-Ax and Biagio Antonacci. In the fifth episode the band officially introduced the new bassist, Ivan, who's going to give the band new ideas, new energies and a definitive sound growth.

=== Gruppo Randa: Finley's independent label - Fuoco e fiamme and Sempre solo noi (2012) ===
2012 marked a period of change for Finley. The band returned to its original lineup with the addition of bassist Ivan, who contributed to the growth and evolution of the group's music. The band entered a significant phase in its career.

The partnership between Claudio Cecchetto and EMI ended. With their manager Omar Pederetti, Finley decided to drastically change direction of their career. They'd lost faith in the traditional model of signing to a major label. The started their own independent label: Gruppo randa.

On 29 May 2012 the band released “Fuoco e fiamme”, the fourth studio album, which is the first published under Gruppo Randa records. The album, with the first single “Fuego”, debuts at the first place in the independent Italian chart and at the sixth in the FIMI/Nielsen chart. This record is characterized by a radical changing comparing to the past works. The new sound thanks to Ivan and Guido Style appears completely refreshed and revolutionized. “Fuoco e fiamme” is made by thirteen rock, powerful songs. The album presents the fire as symbol of recognition, passion and friendship inside all the lyrics and in the graphics too. Once again the band cooperated with Edoardo Bennato who, thanks to his voice and harp, made the single "Il meglio arriverà", one of the more precious songs of the band. To this day this single is the one with the highest number of radio broadcasting in Finley history.

In August, Finley published the single "Olympia (the sound of my nation)", a song dedicated to the 2012 Olympic Games, which is chosen by the Italian Boxing Team as its official soundtrack. The video is shot with the participation of some boxing stars: the bronze medal winner Vincenzo Mangiacapre and other olympic contendent like Domenico Valentino, Vincenzo Picardi, Vittorio Parrinello and Manuel Cappai. In September, a new sport talk show called "Undici" starts on the Italian TV Mediaset. The homonymous song written by Finley becomes the theme song of this program.

On 9 November 2012 Fuoco e fiamme tour starts from Rome and on 4 December 2012 they release "Sempre solo noi". “Sempre solo noi" is the fifth studio album of the band, the second one published by Gruppo Randa. It is a limited edition record which celebrated the 10th birthday of the band that formed in 2002. The first single "Un giorno qualunque" is put online on Finley website on Christmas Day. The album is made of seven new intense songs and it can be considered the most personal and emotional work of Finley, a work that they want to dedicate to the fans that follow and supported them since 2002. As a matter of fact the band put into the album a poster which displayed all the fan photographs as a sign of recognition. Finley cooperated at the end of the year in the recordings of PGA album (Italian punks go acoustic...for good!) with a cover of "I Fought the Law" by the Clash. The project, born in 2010 from an idea of the musician and Virgin radio speaker Andrea Rock. Pga is the first album of over 30 Italian punk-rock musicians, playing acoustic covers of historical rock songs, in order to help a charitable association called "L'isola che non-c'è”

=== Work for Lego and recent activities (2013–present) ===
In 2013, Finley wrote three songs for Legends of Chima, an animated cartoon series, modeled after the Lego product line of the same name. The title song produced for the series was titled as "Unleash the Power". This is their first collaboration for an international audience. Two other songs, "Day of Glory" and "Horizon", were also recorded for the series. All three tracks were available as free downloads on the Legends of Chima website.

The band still continues to remain active despite not having released a new album. On May 17, 2019, Finley released the live album We Are Finley, along with the single "San Diego" being released shortly after.

On December 2, 2019, the band released another single titled, "Santa Claustrofobia".

== Band members ==
Current

- Pedro (Marco Pedretti) – lead vocals, piano (2002–present)
- Ka (Carmine Ruggiero) – guitars, backing vocals (2002–present)
- Dani (Danilo Calvio) – drums (2002–present)
- Ivan (Ivan Moro) – bass guitar, backing vocals (2011–present)

Former

- Ste (Stefano Mantegazza) – bass guitar, backing vocals (2002–2010)

== Discography ==
=== Studio albums ===
- Tutto è possibile (2006)
- Adrenalina (2007)
- Fuori! (2010)
- Fuoco e fiamme (2012)
- Sempre solo noi (2012)
- Armstrong (2017)
- Pogo Mixtape Vol. 1 (2024)

=== EPs ===
- Band at Work (2009)

=== Singles ===
- "Make Up Your Own Mind" (2006)
- "Tutto è possibile" (2005)
- "Diventerai una star" (2006)
- "Dentro alla scatola" feat. Mondo Marcio (2006)
- "Sole di settembre" (2006)
- "Fumo e cenere" (2006)
- "Adrenalina" (2007)
- "Domani" (2007)
- "Questo sono io" (2007)
- "Ricordi" (2008)
- "Your Hero" feat. Belinda (2008)
- "Gruppo Randa" (2009)
- "Fuori!" (2010)
- "Il tempo di un minuto" (2010)
- "Un'altra come te" (2010)
- "In orbita" (2010)
- "Meglio di noi non-c'è niente" (2010)
- "Per la vita che verrà" (2010)
- "Il mondo che non-c'è" (2010)
- "Fuego" (2012)
- "Fuoco e fiamme" (2012)
- "Il meglio arriverà" feat. Edoardo Bennato (2012)
- "Olympia" (2012)
- "Bonnie e Clyde" (2012)
- "Un giorno qualunque" (2012)
- "Unleash The Power" (2013)
- "Horizon" (2013)
- "Day of Glory" (2013)
- "Il Mondo (Gira il mondo gira)" (2016)
- "La fine del mondo" (2017)
- "Odio il DJ" (2017)
- "7 miliardi" (2017)

== Awards ==
2006

- MTV Europe Music Awards 2006 Copenhagen - Best Italian Act
- Double platinum record - Tutto è possibile

2007

- 3 MTV TRL Italian Awards 2007 - Italians do it better, Best lacrima award and Best number one of the year with the song "Diventerai una star"
- Nickelodeon Kids' Choice Awards (Italia)- Best Italian band and Tormentone dell'anno with the song "Adrenalina"

2008

- MTV Europe Music Awards 2008 Liverpool - Best Italian Act
- MTV TRL Italian Awards 2008 - Best riempipiazza
- Nickelodeon Kids' Choice Awards (Italia) - Best Band
- Platinum record - Adrenalina 2

== Extras ==
Finley has sold over 300,000 copies of their five albums and their songs have been chosen by important brands like LEGO, Volkswagen, Kinder, Nickelodeon, Disney Channel, Electronic Arts (The Sims 2: Pets) and Activision (Guitar Hero On Tour Decades and Guitar Hero World Tour) to represent their campaigns and releases. Finley has released their records in Germany, Switzerland, Austria, Spain, France, UK, Canada and Japan.
