= Alejandro Fernández discography =

- Studio albums: 18
- Live albums: 6
- Compilation albums: 7
- Video albums: 3
- Music videos: 54

Listed below is the discography of Mexican mariachi/Latin pop singer-songwriter Alejandro Fernández.

== Albums ==
=== Studio albums ===
List of studio albums, with selected chart positions and certifications
Title	Album details	Peak chart positions					Certifications
Title	Album details	MEX Reg.	US	US Latin	US Latin Pop	CAN	Certifications
Alejandro Fernández	Released: December 15, 1992; Formats: CD; Label: Columbia Records	2	—	—	—	—	
Piel de Niña	Released: May 25, 1993; Formats: CD; Label: Columbia	5	—	—	—	—	
Grandes Éxitos a la Manera de Alejandro Fernández	Released: May 31, 1994; Formats: CD; Label: Columbia	12	—	30	—	—	
Que Seas Muy Feliz	Released: May 2, 1995; Formats: CD; Label: Columbia	12	—	28	—	—	RIAA: Gold
Muy Dentro de Mi Corazón	Released: December 10, 1996; Formats: CD; Label: Sony Discos	12	—	28	—	—	RIAA: 2× Platinum (Latin)
Me Estoy Enamorando	Released: September 23, 1997; Formats: CD; Label: Sony Music	—	125	1	1	—	AMPROFON: 3× Platinum; RIAA: Platinum
Mi Verdad	Released: May 11, 1999; Formats: CD; Label: Columbia	2	148	5	—	—	AMPROFON: 3× Platinum; RIAA: 2× Platinum (Latin)
Entre tus brazos	Released: April 25, 2000; Formats: CD; Label: Sony Music	—	144	1	1	—	AMPROFON: Platinum+Gold; RIAA: 2× Platinum (Latin)
Orígenes	Released: September 25, 2001; Formats: CD; Label: Sony Music	—	—	2	1	—	AMPROFON: 2× Platinum; RIAA: 2× Platinum (Latin)
Niña Amada Mía	Released: March 11, 2003; Formats: CD; Label: Sony Music	10	—	22	—	—	AMPROFON: Platinum
A Corazón Abierto	Released: September 7, 2004; Formats: CD; Label: Sony Music	—	125	2	1	—	AMPROFON: 3× Platinum+Gold
Viento a Favor	Released: June 26, 2007; Formats: CD; Label: Sony Music	—	73	2	1	—	AMPROFON: 2× Platinum+Gold
Dos Mundos: Evolución	Released: December 8, 2009; Formats: CD, digital download, streaming; Label: Fonovisa	—	175	1	1	—	AMPROFON: 2× Platinum+Gold; RIAA: 4× Platinum (Latin)
Dos Mundos: Tradición	Released: December 8, 2009; Formats: CD, digital download, streaming; Label: Fonovisa	1	183	3	—	—	AMPROFON: 2× Platinum; RIAA: 4× Platinum (Latin)
Confidencias	Released: August 27, 2013; Formats: CD, digital download, streaming; Label: Universal Music Latino	—	19	1	1	—	AMPROFON: 4× Platinum+Gold
Rompiendo Fronteras	Released: February 10, 2017; Formats: CD, digital download, streaming; Label: Universal Music Latino	—	123	1	1	—	AMPROFON: 2× Platinum+Gold
Hecho en México	Released: February 14, 2020; Formats: CD, digital download, streaming; Label: Universal Music Latino	1	65	1	—	88	AMPROFON: 2× Platinum+Gold; RIAA: Platinum (Latin)
Te Llevo en la Sangre	Released: May 24, 2024; Formats: CD, digital download, streaming; Label: Universal Music Latino						
"—" denotes a recording that did not chart or was not released in that territory.

=== Live albums ===
List of live albums, with selected chart positions and certifications
Title	Album details	Peak chart positions				Certifications
Title	Album details	MEX REG.	US 200	US Top Latin	US Latin Pop	Certifications
Christmas in Vienna VI	Released: 1999; Formats: CD; Label: Sony	–	–	–	–	
Un Canto de México	Released: 2002; Formats: CD; Label: Sony Music	2	–	6	–	AMPROFON: Platinum+Gold
En Vivo: Juntos Por Ultima Vez	Released: October 14, 2003; Formats: CD; Label: Sony Music	1	196	4	–	AMPROFON: 2× Platinum+Gold
México – Madrid: En Directo y Sin Escalas	Released: October 25, 2005; Formats: CD; Label: Sony Music	–	–	10	5	AMPROFON: 4× Platinum
Dos mundos: Revolución	Released: 2010; Formats: CD; Label: Sony Discos	–	–	27	7	AMPROFON: Platinum
Confidencias reales	Released: 2014; Formats: CD; Label: Universal Music	–	–	–	–	
"—" denotes a recording that did not chart or was not released in that territory.

=== Compilation albums ===
List of compilation albums, with selected chart positions and certifications
Title	Album details	Peak chart positions				Certifications
Title	Album details	MEX REG.	US 200	US Top Latin	US Latin Pop	Certifications
15 años de éxitos	Released: 2007; Formats: CD; Label: Sony	–	180	7	4	AMPROFON: 2× Platinum
De Noche: Clásicos a Mi Manera	Released: 2008; Formats: CD; Label: Sony Music	–	162	6	1	AMPROFON: 2× Platinum
Más Romántico Que Nunca	Released: 2010; Formats: CD, digital download, streaming; Label: Sony Music	–	–	20	3	AMPROFON: Platinum
Mexicanísimo: Sus Más Grandes Éxitos Rancheros	Released: 2010; Formats: CD, digital download, streaming; Label: Sony Music	18	–	35	–	AMPROFON: Gold
Lo esencial de… Alejandro Fernández	Released: 2011; Formats: CD, digital download, streaming; Label: Sony Discos	–	–	–	10	AMPROFON: 3× Platinum+Gold
Canciones de amor	Released: 2012; Formats: CD, digital download, streaming; Label: Sony Discos	–	–	14	–	
Sueño Contigo	Released: 2015; Formats: CD, digital download, streaming; Label: Universal Music	–	–	–	–	
"—" denotes a recording that did not chart or was not released in that territory.

== Singles ==
Title	Year	Billboard charts				Album
Title	Year	Hot Latin Tracks	Latin Pop Airplay	Latin Regional Mexican Airplay	Latin Tropical Airplay	Album
"Brumas"	1992	11	–	–	–	Alejandro Fernández
"Necesito Olvidarla"	1992	19	–	–	–	Alejandro Fernández
"Acabé por Llorar"	1993	24	–	–	–	Piel de Niña
"Cascos Ligeros"	1993	11	–	–	–	Piel de Niña
"A Pesar de Todo"	1994	10	–	10	–	Grandes Éxitos a la Manera de Alejandro Fernández
"Si Dios Me Quita la Vida"	1994	19	–	–	–	Grandes Éxitos a la Manera de Alejandro Fernández
"Como Quien Pierde una Estrella"	1995	17	–	11	–	Que Seas Muy Feliz
"Que Seas Muy Feliz"	1995	17	–	–	–	Que Seas Muy Feliz
"Paso del Norte"	1996	29	–	–	–	Que Seas Muy Feliz
"Qué Bueno"	1997	33	19	–	–	Que Seas Muy Feliz
"Moño Negro"	1997	16	–	12	–	Muy Dentro de Mi Corazón
"Abrázame"	1997	31	16	–	–	Muy Dentro de Mi Corazón
"Es la Mujer"	1997	7	–	4	–	Muy Dentro de Mi Corazón
"Nube Viajera"	1997	9	16	–	–	Muy Dentro de Mi Corazón
"En El Jardín" (feat. Gloria Estefan)	1997	1	1	–	7	Me Estoy Enamorando
"Si Tú Supieras"	1997	1	1	3	7	Me Estoy Enamorando
"No Sé Olvidar"	1998	1	1	–	5	Me Estoy Enamorando
"Yo Nací para Amarte"	1998	1	2	6	9	Me Estoy Enamorando
"Loco"	1999	1	6	2	–	Mi Verdad
"Si He Sabido Amor"	1999	9	15	5	–	Mi Verdad
"Agua del Mar"	2000	–	26	–	–	Entre tus brazos
"Quiéreme"	2000	3	2	37	5	Entre tus brazos
"Si Te Vas"	2000	4	2	7	–	Entre tus brazos
"Tantita Pena"	2001	1	4	11	–	Orígenes
"Si Tú No Vuelves"	2002	27	17	–	–	Orígenes
"Niña Amada Mía"	2003	17	9	–	–	Niña Amada Mía
´"Lucharé por Tu Amor"	2004	19	9	–	–	A Corazón Abierto
"Me Dediqué a Perderte"	2004	1	2	10	4	A Corazón Abierto
"Canta Corazón"	2005	24	9	–	–	A Corazón Abierto
"Qué Lástima"	2005	15	10	–	3	A Corazón Abierto
"¿Qué Voy a Hacer Con Mi Amor?"	2005	31	5	–	–	A Corazón Abierto
"Amor Gitano" (feat. Beyoncé Knowles)	2007	–	23	–	–	Viento a Favor
"No Se Me Hace Fácil"	2007	17	6	–	–	Viento a Favor
"Te Voy a Perder"	2007	9	2	–	–	Viento a Favor
"Eres"	2008	27	9	–	–	Viento a Favor
"Sin Consideración"	2008	43	17	–	–	Viento a Favor
"Estuve"	2009	5	–	3	–	Dos Mundos: Evolución + Tradición
"Se Me Va la Voz"	2009	1	1	–	17	Dos Mundos: Evolución + Tradición

== Videography ==
=== Video albums ===
Title	Video details
AF	Released: 2002; Label: Sony Music Latin; Format: DVD
15 Años de Éxitos	Released: 2007; Label: Sony BMG Music Entertainment; Format: DVD
Más Romántico Que Nunca (Sus Grandes Éxitos Románticos)	Released: 2010; Label: Sony Music Latin; Format: DVD

=== Music videos ===
Year	Title	Album
1992	"Brumas"	Alejandro Fernández
1993	"Piel de niña"	Piel de niña
1994	"A pesar de todo"	Grandes éxitos a la manera de Alejandro Fernández
1995	"Como quién pierde una estrella"	Que seas muy feliz
1995	"La mitad que me faltaba"	Que seas muy feliz
1997	"Abrázame"	Muy dentro de mi corazón
1997	"Nube viajera"	Muy dentro de mi corazón
1997	"Si tú supieras"	Me estoy enamorando
1997	"En el jardín" (with Gloria Estefan)	Me estoy enamorando
1997	"No sé olvidar"	Me estoy enamorando
1999	"Loco"	Mi verdad
1999	"Si he sabido amor"	Mi verdad
1999	"Nadie simplemente nadie"	Mi verdad
2000	"Quiéreme"	Entre tus brazos
2000	"Háblame"	Entre tus brazos
2000	"Quisiera"	Entre tus brazos
2001	"Tantita pena"	Orígenes
2001	"Si tú no vuelves"	Orígenes
2003	"Niña amada mía"	Niña amada mía
2004	"Me dediqué a perderte"	A corazón abierto
2004	"Canta corazón"	A corazón abierto
2005	"Qué lástima"	A corazón abierto
2005	"¿Qué voy a hacer con mi amor?"	A corazón abierto
2007	"Te voy a perder"	Viento a favor
2007	"No se me hace fácil"	Viento a favor
2008	"Eres"	Viento a favor
2009	"Se me va la voz"	Dos mundos: Evolución
2009	"Estuve"	Dos mundos: Tradición
2010	"Bandida"	Dos mundos: Tradición
2010	"Me hace tanto bien"	Dos mundos: Evolución
2013	"Hoy tengo ganas de ti" (with Christina Aguilera)	Confidencias
2013	"Me olvidé de vivir"	Confidencias
2017	"Quiero que vuelvas"	Rompiendo fronteras
2017	"Sé que te duele"	Rompiendo fronteras
2018	"Contigo Siempre" (with Sebastián Yatra)	non-album
2019	"Caballero"	Hecho en México
2019	"Te olvidé"	Hecho en México
2020	"Decepciones" (with Calibre 50)	Hecho en México (Edición Especial)
2020	"Blanca Navidad" (with América, Camila and Valentina Fernández)	non-album
2020	"Duele" (with Christian Nodal)	Hecho en México (Edición Especial)
2021	"Amor tumbado" (with Natanael Cano)	non-album
2021	"No lo beses (Mariachi)"	Hecho en México (Edición Especial)
2022	"Inexperto en olvidarte" (original and Minecraft versions)	Te llevo en la sangre
2023	"No es que me quiera ir"	Te llevo en la sangre
2023	"Difícil tu caso"	Te llevo en la sangre
2024	"Cobijas ajenas" (with Alfredo Olivas)	Te llevo en la sangre
2024	"La tóxica" (with Anitta)	Te llevo en la sangre

=== Collaborations in music videos ===
Year	Title	Other Performer	Album
1996	"Puedes llegar"	Various artists	Voces unidas
2001	"El último adiós"	Various artists	non-album
2004	"Estoy hecho de pedacitos de ti"	Antonio Orozco	El principio del comienzo
2016	"Te quise olvidar"	Juan Gabriel	Los dúo, vol. 2
2020	"Que se sepa nuestro amor"	Mon Laferte	SEIS
2021	"Mariposa traicionera"	Maná	Noches de cantina
2024	"La cumbia triste"	Los Ángeles Azules	Se agradece
