= 15 años de éxitos =

15 Años De Éxitos

Greatest hits album by Alejandro Fernández
- Released: 20 November 2007
- Recorded: 1993–2004
- Genre: Latin pop, mariachi
- Length: 60:15
- Label: Sony Music

Alejandro Fernández chronology
Viento A Favor (2007)	15 Años De Éxitos (2007)	De Noche: Clásicos a Mi Manera (2008)

Professional ratings
Review scores
Source	Rating
Allmusic	4.5/5 stars

15 Años De Éxitos is the first greatest hits album (sixteenth overall) from Mexican singer Alejandro Fernández this album contains 15 successful tracks from 8 of his previous albums (Piel De Niña, Que Seas Muy Feliz, Muy Dentro de Mi Corazón, Me Estoy Enamorando, Mi Verdad, Orígenes, Niña Amada Mía and A Corazón Abierto) in addition to the newly recorded track "El Lado Oscuro del Amor" from the Mexican film "El Búfalo de la Noche". The CD/DVD edition brings in addition to the CD with the 16 tracks, a DVD with six videos of Alejandro Fernández.

== Track listing ==
=== CD ===
No.	Title	Writer(s)	Originally released on	Length
1.	"Me Dediqué A Perderte"	Leonel García	A Corazón Abierto (2004)	3:54
2.	"Qué Voy A Hacer Con Mi Amor"	Luis Carlos Monroy, Raúl Ornelas	A Corazón Abierto (2004)	4:08
3.	"Qué Lástima"	Jaime Flores	A Corazón Abierto (2004)	4:22
4.	"Canta Corazón"	Gian Marco	A Corazón Abierto (2004)	4:14
5.	"No Sé Olvidar"	Kike Santander	Me Estoy Enamorando (1997)	4:21
6.	"Si Tú Supieras"	Kike Santander	Me Estoy Enamorando (1997)	4:06
7.	"Niña Amada Mia"	Jorge Massias	Niña Amada Mía (2003)	3:14
8.	"Si Tu No Vuelves"	Fato	Orígenes (2001)	3:15
9.	"Tantita Pena"	Kiko Campos, Fernando Riba	Orígenes (2001)	3:29
10.	"Si He Sabido Amor"	Humberto Estrada	Mi Verdad (1999)	3:53
11.	"Loco"	Jorge Massias	Mi Verdad (1999)	3:16
12.	"Abrázame"	Rafael Ferro García, Julio Iglesias	Muy Dentro de Mi Corazón (1996)	3:18
13.	"Nube Viajera"	Jorge Massias	Muy Dentro de Mi Corazón (1996)	4:04
14.	"Como Quien Pierde Una Estrella"	Humberto Estrada	Que Seas Muy Feliz (1995)	3:32
15.	"Piel De Niña"	Jesús Gluck, Honorio Herrero	Piel de Niña (1993)	2:41
16.	"El Lado Oscuro Del Amor"	Aleks Syntek	previously unreleased	4:31

=== DVD ===
1. Me Dediqué A Perderte (Video)
2. Qué Voy A Hacer Con Mi Amor (Video)
3. No Sé Olvidar (Video)
4. Si Tú Supieras (Video)
5. Niña Amada Mia (Video)
6. Si Tu No Vuelves (Video)

== Charts ==
=== Weekly charts ===
Chart (2007–2008)	Peak position
Spanish Albums (Promusicae)	85
US Billboard 200	180
US Top Latin Albums (Billboard)	7
US Latin Pop Albums (Billboard)	4

=== Year-end charts ===
Chart (2008)	Position
US Top Latin Albums (Billboard)	33

== Sales and certifications ==
Region	Certification	Certified units/sales
Mexico (AMPROFON)	2× Platinum	200,000^{^}
^{^} Shipments figures based on certification alone.
