= Yo Nací Para Amarte =

Single by Alejandro Fernández

from the album Me Estoy Enamorando
- Released: 1998
- Studio: Crescent Moon Studio (Miami, Florida)
- Genre: Bolero
- Length: 4:28
- Label: Sony Music Mexico
- Songwriter: Kike Santander
- Producers: Kike Santander; Emilio Estefan

Alejandro Fernández singles chronology
"No Sé Olvidar" (1997)	"'Yo Nací Para Amarte'" (1998)	"Loco" (1999)

"Yo Nací Para Amarte" ("I Was Born to Love You") is a song written by Kike Santander and performed by Mexican recording artist Alejandro Fernández. It was co-produced by Santander and Emilio Estefan and was released as the fourth and final single by Sony Music Mexico from Me Estoy Enamorando in 1998. The song is a bolero-pop ballad with ranchera influences and portrays the singer confessing his love which he admits "goes beyond reason".

It reached the top of the Billboard Hot Latin Songs chart in the United States and spent five weeks at this position. The recording led to Fernández receiving a nomination for Hot Latin Track of the Year and Pop Hot Latin Track of the Year at the 1999 Billboard Latin Music Awards while Santander received a BMI Latin Award for the track in the same year.

== Background and composition ==
Since 1992, Alejandro Fernández established his music career as a ranchera singer like his father, iconic ranchera singer, Vicente Fernández. His previous albums, Alejandro Fernández (1992), Piel De Niña (1993), Grandes Éxitos a la Manera de Alejandro Fernández (1994), Que Seas Muy Feliz (1995), and Muy Dentro de Mi Corazón (1996), helped solidify Fernández as a ranchera singer. Although his last album, Muy Dentro de Mi Corazón, was a success, Fernández did not want to simply record another ranchera album. "If I had released another album of just rancheras, people would have just expected the same thing, and then they would have begun to judge me by that one [musical] theme", Fernández explained. He also noted bolero's popularity on radio stations and cited his waning radio airplay. After listening to Mi Tierra by Gloria Estefan, Fernández sought Estefan's husband Emilio Estefan to have him produced Fernández's next album. After hearing Fernández's proposal, Emilio Estefan agreed on the idea to produce the album. Recording took place at Estefan's Crescent Moon Studios in Miami, Florida.

Alejandro Fernández "Yo Nací Para Amarte"
A 26-second sample of the opening track "Yo Nací Para Amarte". Mario Tarradell of The Dallas Morning News notes that the song "uses strings, maracas, trumpets and percussion to frame a meaty declaration of undying love".

"Yo Nací Para Amarte", along with the other tracks in the album, is a bolero-pop ballad song with ranchera influences. The song was written by Colombian songwriter Kike Santander and co-produced by Santander and Estefan. The sound features the usage of strings, maracas, trumpets and percussion. In the lyrics, the protagonist declares his love and admits it "goes beyond reason".

== Reception ==
"Yo Nací Para Amarte" was released as the fourth and final single from Me Estoy Enamorando. In the United States, the single debuted at number 39 on the Billboard Hot Latin Songs chart on the week of 6 June 1998. It reached the top of the chart six weeks later succeeding "Rezo" by Carlos Ponce. The song spent five consecutive weeks in this position until it was replaced by "Una Fan Enamorada" by Servando & Florentino. The song ended 1998 as the seventh best-performing Latin song of the year in the US. The track also reached number two on the Latin Pop Songs chart. In November 1999, "Yo Nací Para Amarte" was labeled as one of the "hottest tracks" for Sony Discos in a list including the most successful songs released by the label since the launch of the Billboard Hot Latin Tracks chart in 1986.

Eliseo Cardona of El Nuevo Herald highlighted "Yo Nací Para Amarte" as one of the boleros where Fernández performs with "intensity and passion". At the 1999 Billboard Latin Music Awards, "Yo Nací Para Amarte" was nominated for Hot Latin Track of the Year and Pop Hot Latin Track of the Year. Fernández lost the first award to "Por Mujeres Como Tu" by Pepe Aguilar and the second to "Vuelve" by Ricky Martin. The track also led to Santander receiving a BMI Latin Award in 1999 in recognition of the best-performing Latin songs in 1998.

== Charts ==
=== Weekly charts ===
Chart (1998)	Peak position
Mexico Ballads (AEE)	9
Panama (Notimex)	1
US Hot Latin Songs (Billboard)	1
US Latin Pop Airplay (Billboard)	2
Venezuela (Record Report)	1

=== Year-end charts ===
Chart (1998)	Position
US Hot Latin Songs (Billboard)	7
US Latin Pop Airplay (Billboard)	10

== Personnel ==
Credits adapted from the Me Estoy Enamorando liner notes.

- Alejandro Fernández – vocals
- Kike Santander – songwriting, arranger, acoustic guitar, vihuela, keyboards
- Nicky Orta – bass
- René Toledo – twelve-string guitar
- Luis Enrique – percussion
- Archie Peña – maracas
- Teddy Mulet – trumpet

== See also ==
- Billboard Top Latin Songs Year-End Chart
- List of number-one Billboard Hot Latin Tracks of 1998
