= En El Jardín =

Single by Alejandro Fernández featuring Gloria Estefan

from the album Me Estoy Enamorando
- Released: 1997
- Studio: Crescent Moon Studio (Miami, Florida)
- Genre: Bolero
- Length: 4:50
- Label: Sony Music Mexico
- Songwriter: Kike Santander
- Producers: Kike Santander; Emilio Estefan

Alejandro Fernández singles chronology
"Si Tú Supieras" (1997)	"En El Jardín" (1997)	"No Sé Olvidar" (1997)

Gloria Estefan singles chronology
"No Pretendo" (1997)	"En El Jardín" (1997)	"Heaven's What I Feel / Corazón Prohibido" (1998)

"En El Jardín" (English: "At the Garden") is a song written by Kike Santander and performed by Mexican recording artist Alejandro Fernández. It was co-produced by Santander and Emilio Estefan and features Cuban-American singer Gloria Estefan. It was released as the second single from Me Estoy Enamorando by Sony Music Mexico in 1997. The song is a pop ballad and portrays both singers falling in love, as if the love blossomed from a garden. A music video featuring both artists was made for the track.

It reached on the top of the Billboard Hot Latin Songs chart in the United States and spent a total of seven weeks at this position. "En El Jardín" was met with positive reviews from music critics. The recording led to Fernández and Estefan receiving a nomination for Pop Group or Duo of the Year at the 10th Annual Lo Nuestro Awards while Santander received a BMI Latin Award for the track in 1999.

== Background and composition ==
Since 1992, Alejandro Fernández established his music career as a ranchera singer like his father, iconic ranchera singer, Vicente Fernández. His previous albums, Alejandro Fernández (1992), Piel De Niña (1993), Grandes Éxitos a la Manera de Alejandro Fernández (1994), Que Seas Muy Feliz (1995), and Muy Dentro de Mi Corazón (1996), helped solidify Fernández as a ranchera singer. Although his last album, Muy Dentro de Mi Corazón, was a success, Fernández did not want to simply record another ranchera album. "If I had released another album of just rancheras, people would have just expected the same thing, and then they would have begun to judge me by that one [musical] theme", Fernández explained. He also noted bolero's popularity on radio stations and cited his waning radio airplay. After listening to Mi Tierra by Gloria Estefan, Fernández sought Estefan's husband Emilio Estefan to have him produce Fernández's next album. After hearing Fernández's proposal, Emilio Estefan agreed on the idea to produce the album.

Alejandro Fernández and Gloria Estefan "En El Jardín"
A 29-second sample of "En El Jardín", a duet ballad by Alejandro Fernández and Gloria Estefan.The Dallas Morning News editor Mario Tarradell felt that its "mix of acoustic guitar, trumpet and maracas capture the intoxicating allure of a private paradise."

"En El Jardín" is a ballad duet with Gloria Estefan. It was written by Colombian songwriter Kike Santander and co-produced by Santander and Emilio Estefan. The song features Santander performing the accordion, acoustic guitars, and vihuela. In the lyrics, both singers describe falling in love with each other that was blossomed in a garden of loves. In the music video for the song, Fernández and Estefan are singing in a garden with musicians playing in the background. Fernández and Estefan performed the song live during the "Jalisco en Vivo" concert in 2009. The track was included on Fernández's compilation album Más Romantico Que Nunca: Sus Grandes Éxitos Romanticos (2010), and on Estefan's compilation albums Amor y Suerte: Exitos Romanticos (2004) and Mis Favoritas (2010).

== Reception ==
"En El Jardín" was released as the second single from Me Estoy Enamorando. In the United States, "En El Jardín" debuted at number 20 on the Billboard Hot Latin Songs chart on the week of 6 December 1997. It reached on top of the chart three weeks later, succeeding Marc Anthony's song "Y Hubo Alguien". It returned to this position two weeks later succeeding Fernández's song "Si Tú Supieras" and spent a total of five weeks on top of the chart. The song ended 1998 as the eighth best-performing Latin song of the year in the US. The track also reached the top of the Latin Pop Songs chart where it spent eight consecutive weeks in this position. In November 1999, "En El Jardín" was labeled as one of the "hottest tracks" for Sony Discos in a list including the most successful songs released by the label since the launching of the Billboard Hot Latin Tracks chart in 1986.

Knight Ridder music critic Howard Cohen called it a "creamy" duet. Ramiro Burr of the San Antonio Express-News described it as "a glorious ballad on the moment love is born". The Dallas Morning News editor Mario Tarradell praised the track noting that Fernández and Estefan "works not only as an ideal pairing - there's palpable chemistry in their voices - but the cut's sexy mix of acoustic guitar, trumpet and maracas capture the intoxicating allure of a private paradise." Eliseo Cardona of El Nuevo Herald felt that Estefan's performance with Fernández made her sound better than she should be on her albums.

The song led to Fernández and Estefan receiving a nomination for Pop Group or Duo of the Year at the 10th Annual Lo Nuesro Awards in 1998, but lost to Juan Gabriel and Rocío Dúrcal. The track also led to Santander receiving a BMI Latin Award in 1999 in recognition of the best-performing Latin songs in 1998.

== Personnel ==
Credits adapted from the Me Estoy Enamorando liner notes.

- Alejandro Fernández – vocals
- Gloria Estefan – guest vocals
- Kike Santander – songwriting, arranger, acoustic guitar, vihuela, accordion, bass guitar, keyboards
- Rafael Solano – percussion
- Archie Peña – drums, maracas
- Teddy Mulet – trumpet

== Charts ==
=== Weekly charts ===
Chart (1997)	Peak position
US Hot Latin Songs (Billboard)	1
US Latin Pop Airplay (Billboard)	1

=== Year-end charts ===
Chart (1998)	Position
US Hot Latin Songs (Billboard)	8
US Latin Pop Songs (Billboard)	6

== See also ==
- Billboard Top Latin Songs Year-End Chart
- List of number-one Billboard Hot Latin Tracks of 1997
- List of number-one Billboard Hot Latin Tracks of 1998
- List of Billboard Latin Pop Airplay number ones of 1997
- List of Billboard Latin Pop Airplay number ones of 1998
