= Si Tú Supieras =

1997 single by Alejandro Fernández

Single by Alejandro Fernández

from the album Me Estoy Enamorando
- Released: 18 August 1997
- Studio: Crescent Moon Studio (Miami, Florida)
- Genre: Bolero
- Length: 4:04
- Label: Sony Music Mexico
- Songwriter: Kike Santander
- Producers: Kike Santander; Emilio Estefan

Alejandro Fernández singles chronology
"Es la Mujer" (1997)	"Si Tú Supieras" (1997)	"En El Jardín" (1997)

Music video
- "Si Tú Supieras" on YouTube

"Si Tú Supieras" ("If You Knew") is a song written by Kike Santander and performed by Mexican recording artist Alejandro Fernández. It was co-produced by Santander and Emilio Estefan and was released as the first single from Me Estoy Enamorando by Sony Music Mexico on 18 August 1997. The song is a bolero-pop ballad with ranchera influences and portrays the singer yearning for his lover to know how much she means to him. A music video was made for the track and was used as the main theme for the Mexican telenovela María Isabel.

It reached the top of the Billboard Hot Latin Songs chart in the United States and spent a total of six weeks at this position. The recording led to Fernández winning the Lo Nuestro Award for Pop Song of the Year and the Eres awards for Best Song and Best Musical Theme in 1998 while Santander received the BMI Latin Award for Song of the Year in 1999. "Si Tú Supieras" has been covered by other artists including Tony Vega, Manuel Mijares, Noel Schajris, and Chamin Correa. Vega's version peaked at number five on the Hot Latin Songs chart in the US.

== Background and composition ==
Since 1992 Alejandro Fernández established his music career as a ranchera singer like his father, iconic ranchera singer, Vicente Fernández. His previous albums, Alejandro Fernández (1992), Piel De Niña (1993), Grandes Éxitos a la Manera de Alejandro Fernández (1994), Que Seas Muy Feliz (1995), and Muy Dentro de Mi Corazón (1996), helped solidify Fernández as a ranchera singer. Although his last album, Muy Dentro de Mi Corazón, was a success, Fernández did not want to simply record another ranchera album. "If I had released another album of just rancheras, people would have just expected the same thing, and then they would have begun to judge me by that one [musical] theme", Fernández explained. He also noted bolero's popularity on radio stations and cited his waning radio airplay. After listening to Mi Tierra by Gloria Estefan, Fernández sought Estefan's husband Emilio Estefan to have him produced Fernández's next album. After hearing Fernández's proposal, Emilio Estefan agreed on the idea to produce the album. Recording took place at Estefan's Crescent Moon Studios in Miami, Florida.

Alejandro Fernández "Si Tú Supieras"
A 24-second sample of "Si Tú Supieras", a bolero-pop ballad song. Knight Ridder music critic Howard Cohen noted that it is a "mellow" track.

"Si Tú Supieras", along with the other tracks in the album, is a bolero-pop ballad song with ranchera influences. It was written by Colombian songwriter Kike Santander and co-produced by Santander and Estefan. In the lyrics, the protagonist yearns for his love interest to understand how much he loves her. The song was featured as the opening theme for the Mexican telenovela María Isabel. Fernández performed the song live during his promotional tour for Me Estoy Enamorando. A live version of "Si Tú Supieras" was included on the album Confidencias Reales: En Vivo Desde el Teatro Real (2014). The track was also added to the compilation albums 15 Años de Éxitos (2007) and Más Romantico Que Nunca: Sus Grandes Éxitos Romanticos (2010).

== Reception ==
"Si Tú Supieras" was released on 18 August 1997. In the United States, it debuted at number five on the Billboard Hot Latin Songs chart on the week of 20 September 1997. It reached number one on the chart, replacing "La Venia Bendita" by Marco Antonio Solís, and spent five weeks on top of this chart until it was succeeded by Cristian Castro's song "Lo Mejor de Mí. It later reached number one again on the week of 3 January 1998 and was succeeded by Fernández and Gloria Estefan's song "En El Jardín". The track also reached on top of the Latin Pop Songs chart where it spent two weeks in this position. "Si Tú Supieras" ended 1998 as the second best-performing Latin song of the year in the US. In November 1999, "Si Tú Supieras" was labeled as one of the "hottest tracks" for Sony Discos in a list including the most successful songs released by the label since the launching of the Billboard Hot Latin Tracks chart in 1986. In 2016, "Si Tú Supieras" ranked number three on Billboard's Greatest of All Time Hot Latin Songs chart.

Knight Ridder music critic Howard Cohen called it a "mellow" song. Eliseo Cardona of El Nuevo Herald highlighted "Si Tú Supieras" as one of the boleros where Fernández performs with "intensity and passion". At the 10th Annual Lo Nuestro Awards in 1998, it won the award Pop Song of the Year. At the 1998 Premios Eres, it won the awards for Best Song and Best Musical Theme (for its usage on María Isabel). "Si Tú Supieras" also led to Santander receiving the BMI Latin Award for Song of the Year in 1999.

== Music video ==
The music video begins with Fernández watching a video in his house which shows him, and his childhood friend on a movie projector screen when they were younger. He then proceeds to go on a double date with his friend in a café and meet each other's lover. His friend's lover becomes infatuated with Fernández and the two become enamored with each other. Although the relationship between the two grows, Fernández realizes that it would only hurt his childhood friend and decides to break away from her.

== Cover versions ==
In 1998, Puerto Rican salsa singer Tony Vega covered "Si Tú Supieras" on his album Hoy Quiero Cantarte. It was released as a single for the album and peaked at number five on the Hot Latin Songs chart. Mexican recording artist Manuel Mijares recorded his version of the song on his album Vivir Así (2009). Argentine-Mexican singer Noel Schajris covered the track on his album Grandes Canciones (2011). AllMusic editor Jon O'Brien criticized Schajris for choosing to "play it safe with perfunctory covers of drippy romantic ballads" with "Si Tú Supieras" being cited as one of the examples. Mexican guitarist Chamin Correa performed an instrumental version on his album Cuerdas Amor Y Guitarra, Vol. 2 (1997).

== Charts ==
=== Weekly charts ===
Chart (1997)	Peak position
US Hot Latin Songs (Billboard)	1
US Latin Pop Airplay (Billboard)	1

=== Year-end charts ===
Chart (1997)	Position
US Hot Latin Songs (Billboard)	12
US Latin Pop Songs (Billboard)	13

Chart (1998)	Position
US Hot Latin Songs (Billboard)	2
US Latin Pop Songs (Billboard)	5

=== All-time charts ===
Chart (2021)	Position
US Hot Latin Songs (Billboard)	4

== Personnel ==
Credits adapted from the Me Estoy Enamorando liner notes.

- Alejandro Fernández – vocals
- Kike Santander – songwriting and arranger
- René Toledo – twelve-string guitar
- Luis Enrique – percussion
- Archie Peña – maracas and drums

== See also ==
- Billboard Top Latin Songs Year-End Chart
- List of number-one Billboard Hot Latin Tracks of 1997
- List of number-one Billboard Hot Latin Tracks of 1998
- List of Billboard Latin Pop Airplay number ones of 1997
