= No Sé Olvidar =

Single by Alejandro Fernández

from the album Me Estoy Enamorando
- Released: February 9, 1998
- Studio: Crescent Moon Studio (Miami, Florida)
- Genre: Bolero
- Length: 4:21
- Label: Sony Music Mexico
- Songwriter: Kike Santander
- Producers: Kike Santander; Emilio Estefan

Alejandro Fernández singles chronology
"En El Jardín" (1998)	"No Sé Olvidar" (1998)	"Yo Nací Para Amarte" (1998)

Music video
- "No Sé Olvidar" on YouTube

"No Sé Olvidar" ("I Don't Know How to Forget") is a song written by Kike Santander and performed by Mexican recording artist Alejandro Fernández. It was co-produced by Santander and Emilio Estefan and was released as the third single from Me Estoy Enamorando by Sony Music Mexico in 1997. The song is a bolero-pop ballad with ranchera influences and portrays the singer desperately trying to forget his lover. A music video was made for the track which features Fernández hopelessly attempting to not remember his lover only to slowly delve into insanity. It received a nomination for Video of the Year at the 1998 Lo Nuestro Awards.

It reached the top of the Billboard Hot Latin Songs chart in the United States and spent eight weeks at this position. The recording led to Fernández receiving a nomination for Hot Latin Track of the Year and Pop Hot Latin Track of the Year at the 1999 Billboard Latin Music Awards while Santander received a BMI Latin Award for the track in the same year.

== Background and composition ==
Since 1992, Alejandro Fernández established his music career as a ranchera singer like his father, iconic ranchera singer, Vicente Fernández. His previous albums, Alejandro Fernández (1992), Piel De Niña (1993), Grandes Éxitos a la Manera de Alejandro Fernández (1994), Que Seas Muy Feliz (1995), and Muy Dentro de Mi Corazón (1996), helped solidify Fernández as a ranchera singer. Although his last album, Muy Dentro de Mi Corazón, was a success, Fernández did not want to simply record another ranchera album. "If I had released another album of just rancheras, people would have just expected the same thing, and then they would have begun to judge me by that one [musical] theme", Fernández explained. He also noted bolero's popularity on radio stations and cited his waning radio airplay. After listening to Mi Tierra by Gloria Estefan, Fernández sought Estefan's husband Emilio Estefan to have him produce Fernández's next album. After hearing Fernández's proposal, Emilio Estefan agreed on the idea to produce the album. Recording took place at Estefan's Crescent Moon Studios in Miami, Florida.

Alejandro Fernández "No Sé Olvidar"
A 26-second sample of "No Sé Olvidar", a bolero-pop ballad song. Ramiro Burr of the San Antonio Express-News noted that Fernández's vocals conveys "both the thrill and the terror of love's powerful addiction".

"No Sé Olvidar", along with the other tracks in the album, is a bolero-pop ballad song with ranchera influences. It was written by Colombian songwriter Kike Santander and co-produced by Santander and Estefan. The lyrics portrays the protagonist being tormented by not being able forget his lover and pleads to see her again. Fernández performed the song live during his promotional tour for Me Estoy Enamorando. "No Sé Olvidar" was released as the third single from Me Estoy Enamorando. A live version of trasck was included on the album Confidencias Reales: En Vivo Desde el Teatro Real (2014). The track was also added to the compilation albums 15 Años de Éxitos (2007) and Más Romantico Que Nunca: Sus Grandes Éxitos Romanticos (2010).

== Reception ==
In the United States, "No Sé Olvidar" debuted at number 28 on the Billboard Hot Latin Songs chart on the week of 21 February 1998. The single reached on top of the chart two weeks later, succeeding "Vuelve" by Ricky Martin. It spent eight consecutive weeks in this position being replaced by "Una Fan Enamorada" by Servando & Florentino. The song ended 1998 as the sixth best-performing Latin song of the year in the US. The track also reached the top of the Latin Pop Songs chart where it spent a total of eight weeks in this position, tying with Carlos Ponce's "Rezo" as the longest-leading number song of the year. In November 1999, "No Sé Olvidar" was labeled as one of the "hottest tracks" for Sony Discos in a list including the most successful songs released by the label since the launching of the Billboard Hot Latin Tracks chart in 1986.

Eliseo Cardona of El Nuevo Herald highlighted "No Sé Olvidar" as one of the boleros where Fernández performs with "intensity and passion". At the 1999 Billboard Latin Music Awards, "No Sé Olvidar" was nominated for Hot Latin Track of the Year and Pop Hot Latin Track of the Year. Fernández lost the first award to "Por Mujeres Como Tu" by Pepe Aguilar and the second to "Vuelve" by Ricky Martin. The track also led to Santander receiving a BMI Latin Award in 1999 in recognition of the best-performing Latin songs in 1998.

== Music video ==
At the beginning of the music video, Fernández turns on the car radio where a radio personality woman named Veronica is on air and he immediately gets flashbacks of her. Once he arrives at his house, he turns on the radio where Veronica plays "No Sé Olvidar" on the radio station. Fernández glances at the photos of him and Veronica and burns them at the fireplace. He steps outside but still cannot forget the time he spent with her and imagines Veronica next to him. He exercises as another attempt to forget but to no avail. Fernández takes a shower and hallucinates Veronica being next to him and holding him. Fernández begins to lose his mind and breaks the house furniture. He picks up another photo of him and Veronica, lits it on fire, and proceeds to set the house on fire. At the end of the song, Veronica asks Fernández for forgiveness on the radio. "The video ends with a quote in Spanish, translating to "Not even fire can consume the soul...". It received a nomination for Video of the Year at the 10th Annual Lo Nuestro Awards in 1998, but lost to "Ella y Él" by Ricardo Arjona.

== Charts ==
=== Weekly charts ===
Chart (1998)	Peak position
El Salvador (Notimex)	5
Mexico Ballads (AEE)	1
US Hot Latin Songs (Billboard)	1
US Latin Pop Airplay (Billboard)	1
Venezuela (Record Report)	3

=== Year-end charts ===
Chart (1998)	Position
US Hot Latin Songs (Billboard)	6
US Latin Pop Songs (Billboard)	3

== Personnel ==
Credits adapted from the Me Estoy Enamorando liner notes.

- Alejandro Fernández – vocals
- Kike Santander – songwriting, arranger, acoustic guitar, vihuela, bass, keyboards
- René Toledo – twelve-string guitar
- Rafael Solano – percussion
- Archie Peña – drums, maracas
- Teddy Mulet – trumpet

== See also ==
- Billboard Top Latin Songs Year-End Chart
- List of number-one Billboard Hot Latin Tracks of 1998
- List of Billboard Latin Pop Airplay number ones of 1998
