= De Noche: Clásicos a Mi Manera =

De Noche: Clásicos a Mi Manera...

Compilation album by Alejandro Fernández
- Released: 2 December 2008
- Recorded: 1993–2008
- Genre: Latin ballad; Latin pop; ranchera; bolero
- Length: 56:21
- Label: Columbia; Sony BMG Norte
- Producer: Pedro Ramírez; Juan Felipe Navarro; Silvestre Mercado; Chucho Rincón; Fabián Rincón

Alejandro Fernández chronology
Viento A Favor (2007)	De Noche: Clásicos a Mi Manera... (2008)	Dos Mundos: Evolución + Tradición (2009)

Professional ratings
Review scores
Source	Rating
Allmusic	3.5/5 stars

De Noche: Clásicos a Mi Manera... is the name of the second compilation album (and seventeenth overall) by Mexican singer Alejandro Fernández. It was released on 2 December 2008 through Columbia Records and Sony BMG Norte. It has 16 cover songs by classic Mexican composers such as Agustín Lara, Roberto Cantoral, and Armando Manzanero, over half of which were previously released on the Grandes Éxitos a la Manera de Alejandro Fernández album in 1994. It also includes four new tracks recorded specifically for the album.

== Track listing ==
=== CD ===
No.	Title	Writer(s)	Originally released on	Length
1.	"Abrázame"	Rafael Ferro García; Julio Iglesias	Muy Dentro de Mi Corazón (1996)	3:19
2.	"El reloj"	Roberto Cantoral	previously unreleased	3:29
3.	"No"	Armando Manzanero	Grandes Éxitos a la Manera de... (1994)	3:16
4.	"Nadie, simplemente nadie"	Susana Fernández	Mi Verdad (1999)	3:46
5.	"El día que me quieras"	Carlos Gardel; Alfredo Le Pera	Grandes Éxitos a la Manera de... (1994)	4:19
6.	"Regálame esta noche"	Roberto Cantoral	previously unreleased	2:52
7.	"Piensa en mí"	Agustín Lara	Grandes Éxitos a la Manera de... (1994)	4:26
8.	"Si Dios me quita la vida"	Luis Demetrio	Grandes Éxitos a la Manera de... (1994)	4:35
9.	"La gloria eres tú"	José Antonio Méndez	Grandes Éxitos a la Manera de... (1994)	2:58
10.	"Contigo aprendí"	Armando Manzanero	Piel de Niña (1993)	3:27
11.	"A pesar de todo"	Augusto Algueró; Antonio Guijarro	Grandes Éxitos a la Manera de... (1994)	3:20
12.	"Encadenados"	Carlos Arturo Briz	Grandes Éxitos a la Manera de... (1994)	2:55
13.	"Cuando ya no me quieras"	Cuates Castilla	previously unreleased	3:20
14.	"Noche de ronda"	Agustín Lara	Grandes Éxitos a la Manera de... (1994)	4:03
15.	"La enramada"	Graciela Olmos	Grandes Éxitos a la Manera de... (1994)	2:57
16.	"Perfume de gardenias"	Rafael Hernández Marín	previously unreleased	3:08
Total length:				56:21

== Charts ==
=== Weekly charts ===
Chart (2008–2010)	Peak position
Spanish Albums (PROMUSICAE)	19
US Billboard 200	162
US Top Latin Albums (Billboard)	6
US Latin Pop Albums (Billboard)	1

=== Year-end charts ===
Chart (2009)	Position
US Top Latin Albums (Billboard)	40

== Sales and certifications ==
Region	Certification	Certified units/sales
Mexico (AMPROFON)	2× Platinum	160,000^{^}
^{^} Shipments figures based on certification alone.
