= Hecho en México (Alejandro Fernández album) =

Studio album by Alejandro Fernández
- Released: February 14, 2020
- Recorded: 2019
- Genre: Mariachi
- Length: 39:50
- Label: Universal Music México
- Producer: Áureo Baqueiro

Alejandro Fernández chronology
Rompiendo Fronteras (2017)	Hecho en México (2020)

Singles from Hecho en México
- 1. "Caballero" Released: October 3, 2019; 2. "Te Olvidé" Released: January 17, 2020; 3. "Eso y Más" Released: April 8, 2020; 4. "Decepciones" Released: August 21, 2020; 5. "Duele" Released: February 21, 2021; 6. "No Lo Beses (Mariachi)" Released: July 15, 2021

Hecho en México (English: Made in Mexico) is the seventeenth studio album by Mexican singer Alejandro Fernández, released on February 14, 2020, through Universal Music México. It was produced by Áureo Baqueiro and features a collaboration with fellow regional Mexican artist Christian Nodal, as well one with his father Vicente Fernández. On July 16, 2021, he released a special edition of the album with six more songs including a second collaboration with Nodal and a song with Mexican band Calibre 50.

At the 21st Annual Latin Grammy Awards, the album won Best Ranchero/Mariachi Album while "Caballero" was nominated for Best Regional Mexican Song, the nomination going to José Luis Roma, its songwriter. The album was also nominated for Best Regional Mexican Music Album (including Tejano) at the 63rd Annual Grammy Awards and for Album of the Year at the Premio Lo Nuestro 2021.

The album topped both the Top Latin Albums and Regional Mexican Albums charts, as well as reaching number one in Mexico and Spain. It was also certified platinum in both United States and Mexico. With Hecho en México topping the Top Latin Albums chart, Fernández became the first artist to achieve number-one albums in the list through four different decades after reaching the top position with Me Estoy Enamorando (1997), Entre Tus Brazos (2000), Dos Mundos: Evolución (2009), Confidencias (2013) and Rompiendo Fronteras (2017).

== Background ==
Hecho en México marked a return to Regional Mexican music for Fernández after releasing mainly latin pop albums such as Rompiendo Fronteras (2017), Confidencias (2013) and Dos Mundos: Evolución (2009), about the album he said that "it is the compilation of great stories, endless searches and countless hours of work, going back to my roots couldn't take less than that". To promote the album, Fernández embarked on the Hecho en México World Tour, spanning through several cities of Mexico, United States and Spain, as well as including his first concerts in London, Paris and Toronto.

== Singles ==
The album was supported by two singles, "Caballero", released on October 3, 2019, and "Te Olvidé", released on January 17, 2020. To promote the special edition of the album, four of its songs were released as singles, two in 2020: "Eso y Más" on April 8 and "Decepciones" featuring Mexican band Calibre 50 on August 21, and two in 2021: "Duele" featuring Mexican singer Christian Nodal on February 21 and "No Lo Beses (Mariachi)" on July 15. All singles but "Eso y Más" and "No Lo Beses (Mariachi)" appeared in the Hot Latin Songs chart ("Caballero" at 20, "Te Olvide" at 23, "Duele" at 23 and "Decepciones" at 28), additionally, the four singles previously mentioned also topped the Regional Mexican Airplay chart, giving Fernandéz his first number-one songs in the chart.

== Critical reception ==
American magazine Billboard place the album was number forty-eight in their list of 50 Best Albums of 2020, Griselda Flores wrote that "with mariacheño (a fusion of mariachi and norteño) songs like "Caballero," "Decepciones" and "Mentí", the Mexican singer revitalizes traditional regional Mexican music, but adds a contemporary twist, thanks to the contributions of young songwriters like Joss Favela, Eden Muñoz and Christian Nodal".

== Track listing ==
All tracks were produced by Áureo Baqueiro.

Hecho en México track listing
No.	Title	Writer(s)	Length
1.	"A Que Sabe el Olvido"	Joss Favela	3:13
2.	"Caballero"	José Luis Roma	3:49
3.	"Decepciones"	Rodolfo Edén Muñoz Cantú	3:44
4.	"Te Olvidé"	Francisco "El Gallo" Elizalde; Roberto "El Serebro" Álvarez Gómez	3:06
5.	"Más No Puedo" (featuring Christian Nodal)	Christian Nodal	3:42
6.	"Mudanza a la Luna"	Espinoza Paz	3:48
7.	"Por Tu Adiós"	Luís Carlos Monroy; Manu Moreno	4:05
8.	"Mentí" (featuring Vicente Fernández)	Oliver Ochoa López	3:16
9.	"La Mesa 20"	Jaime Flores; Monroy	2:40
10.	"Hasta en Mis Huesos"	Jorge Massias	4:04
11.	"Nuestro Gran Secreto"	Brian Sandoval	2:23
Total length:			39:50

Hecho en México (Special Edition) track listing
No.	Title	Writer(s)	Length
12.	"No Lo Beses (Mariachi)"	José Luis Ortega	3:22
13.	"No Prenderé la Luz"	Pablo Preciado; Poncho Arocha	3:31
14.	"Duele" (featuring Christian Nodal)	Edgar Barrera; Nodal	3:13
15.	"Ibas de Salida"	Favela	3:20
16.	"Decepciones" (featuring Calibre 50)	Muñoz Cantú	3:44
17.	"Eso y Más"	José Manuel Figueroa	2:46
Total length:			57:55

== Charts ==
Chart performance for Hecho en México
Chart (2020)	Peak position
Canadian Albums (Billboard)	88
Mexican Albums (AMPROFON)	1
Spanish Albums (PROMUSICAE)	1
US Billboard 200	65
US Top Latin Albums (Billboard)	1
US Regional Mexican Albums (Billboard)	1

== Certifications ==
Certifications for Hecho en México
Region	Certification	Certified units/sales
Mexico (AMPROFON)	2× Platinum+Gold	150,000^{‡}
United States (RIAA)	Platinum (Latin)	60,000^{‡}
^{‡} Sales+streaming figures based on certification alone.

== See also ==
- 2020 in Latin music
- List of number-one Billboard Latin Albums from the 2020s
