= Me Estoy Enamorando (album) =

Studio album by Alejandro Fernández
- Released: 23 September 1997
- Studios: Crescent Moon Studios (Miami, Florida)
- Genres: Ballad; bolero; ranchera
- Length: 40:48
- Language: Spanish
- Label: Sony Music Mexico
- Producers: Emilio Estefan, Jr.; Kike Santander

Alejandro Fernández chronology
Muy Dentro de Mi Corazón (1996)	Me Estoy Enamorando (1997)	Mi Verdad (1999)

Singles from Me Estoy Enamorado
- 1. "Si Tú Supieras" Released: 18 August 1997; 2. "En El Jardín" Released: 1997; 3. "No Sé Olvidar" Released: 1997; 4. "Yo Nací Para Amarte" Released: 1998

Me Estoy Enamorando (I'm Falling in Love) is the sixth studio album by Mexican singer Alejandro Fernández. It was released by Sony Music Mexico on 23 September 1997. It marks a musical style change where Fernández performs pop ballads and boleros as opposed to mariachi music. His decision to record a pop album transpired after having aspirations to expand his audience. Fernández asked Emilio Estefan to produce his next project after listening to Mi Tierra (1993) by his wife Gloria Estefan. Recording took place at Estefan's Crescent Moon Studios in Miami, Florida. Estefan's partner Kike Santander co-produced the recording along with Estefan and composed most of the album's tracks. The musical style consists of pop-boleros with ranchera influences while the lyrics reflect the theme of love. Four singles were released from the album: "Si Tú Supieras", "En El Jardín" (a duet with Gloria Estefan), "No Sé Olvidar", and "Yo Nací Para Amarte". Each of them reached number one on the Billboard Hot Latin Songs chart in the United States. A tour to promote the album was launched in the US and Latin America.

Upon its release, Me Estoy Enamorando was met with positive reviews from music critics who praised Fernández's vocals, Estefan's productions, and Santander's songwriting. Fernández received several accolades including a Grammy nomination for Best Latin Pop Performance. In the US, it reached number one on the Billboard Top Latin Albums chart, spent a total of twelve weeks in this position, and was the bestselling Latin album in the country. It was certified platinum by the Recording Industry Association of America (RIAA) for shipping one million copies. In Mexico, it sold over 530,000 copies and it was certified platinum in Argentina by the Argentine Chamber of Phonograms and Videograms Producers (CAPIF). Me Estoy Enamorando has sold over 2.2 million copies as of 2011.

== Background ==
Since 1992 Alejandro Fernandez established his musical career as a ranchera singer, parallel to that of his father the King of Ranchera music, Vicente Fernandez. His previous albums, Alejandro Fernández (1992), Piel De Niña (1993), Grandes Éxitos a la Manera de Alejandro Fernández (1994), Que Seas Muy Feliz (1995), and Muy Dentro de Mi Corazón (1996), helped solidify his reputation as a ranchera singer. Although his last album, Muy Dentro de Mi Corazón, was a success, Fernández did not want to simply record another ranchera album. "If I had released another album of just rancheras, people would have just expected the same thing, and then they would have begun to judge me by that one [musical] theme", Fernández explained. He also noted bolero's popularity on radio stations, and cited his waning radio airplay as another reason to change. After listening to Mi Tierra (1993) by Gloria Estefan, Fernández sought out her husband Emilio to ask him to produce his next album. After hearing Fernández's proposal, Emilio Estefan agreed to produce the album.

Fernández's father disapproved of him recording a pop album. "It got to the point where we didn't even talk anymore. He put this great distance between us", Fernández recalled. After hearing the final mix of the album, Vicente Fernández retracted his disapproval and enjoyed the recording. Me Estoy Enamorando was recorded at the Estefans' Crescent Moon Studios in Miami, Florida.

== Musical style and themes ==
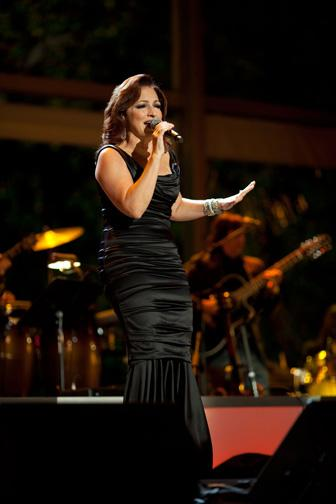
Alejandro Fernández covers Gloria Estefan's (pictured) song "Volverás" on Me Estoy Enamorando. Estefan herself makes on an appearance on the track "En el Jardín" in a duet with Fernández.

Me Estoy Enamorando is composed of ten tracks which consists of ballads, boleros, and rancheras. Six of the songs were written and composed by Emilio Estefan Jr.'s partner Kike Santander. Maria Jimena Muñoz, Roberto D. Blades, and Rafael Ferro also contributed to the album's songwriting. In addition to the blend of ranchera and pop ballads, the recording also features guest musicians Luis Enrique on the percussion, the London Symphony Orchestra playing the string arrangements, and mariachi guitarist David (Tachi) Mora-Arriaga on the track "Como el Sol y El Trigo". The album uses Estefan's "touch" of "lush, juggling mariachi band trumpets and 'vihuela' guitar" as well as maracas and percussion.

Lyrically, the songs on the album involve "falling in love", [and are] "a soundtrack for seduction". "Yo Nací Para Amarte" deals with a "meaty declaration of undying love" where the singer "admits that his love goes beyond reason". "No Sé Olvidar" conveys "both the thrill and the terror of love's powerful addiction". "Como el Sol y el Trigo" likens the singer's lost love to "his life as the sun is to a wheat field". The final track "Promesa" involves a man describing "the joy in trying to be the best man he can be, to be worthy of her". Fernández also covers Gloria Estefan's "Volverás" from her album Mi Tierra. Estefan herself makes a guest appearance on the duet track "En El Jardín", a "glorious ballad on the moment love is born".

== Singles and promotion ==
Alejandro Fernández "Yo Nací Para Amarte"
A 26-second sample of the opening track "Yo Nací Para Amarte". Mario Tarradell of The Dallas Morning News notes that the song "uses strings, maracas, trumpets and percussion to frame a meaty declaration of undying love".

"Si Tú Supieras" was released as the album's first single on 18 August 1997. It became his first number one single on the Billboard Hot Latin Songs chart in the United States (US) spending six weeks in that position. The track was featured as the theme song for the Mexican telenovela María Isabel (1997). The second single, "En El Jardín," was the second number-one song from the album and spent two weeks on top of the Hot Latin Songs chart. Its third and fourth singles, "No Sé Olvidar" and "Yo Nací Para Amarte," also reached number one on the same chart holding that position for eight and five weeks respectively. The title track and "Como El Sol y El Trigo" were released as promo singles in Mexico and Spain respectively. Music videos were made for "Si Tú Supieras", "En El Jardín", and "No Sé Olvidar".

To promote Me Estoy Enamorando, Fernández launched his first solo tour performing in Argentina, Central America, Mexico, and the US. He also performed at the 1998 Viña del Mar festival in Chile. His set list consisted of rancheras from his past recordings, several tracks from Me Estoy Enamorando, and a Spanish-language rendition of Frank Sinatra's "My Way". Fernández was accompanied by a 15-piece mariachi band for his ranchera performances. Reviewing his concert at the Universal Amphitheatre in Los Angeles, California, Los Angeles Times editor Ernesto Lechner felt that Fernández "seemed to suffer from the same malady that affects most modern Mexican pop stars", citing "Si Tú Supieras" and "No Sé Olvidar" as "unnervingly soulless". Alejandro Riera of the Chicago Tribune commented that Fernández has "one mean set of pipes" and "used that voice to successfully seduce just about everybody in his mostly female audience". Riera also noted that unlike his father, Vicente, who sings "the tequila-drenched songs of unrequited love", Alejandro "praises the power that women hold over men. He sees them as superior beings even when he takes on the persona of the disdained lover." Laura Emerick wrote a mixed review of his performance at the Rosement Theatre. She felt that even though Fernández is focused on being independent from his father, "young Alejandro remains a pony, not a stylistic stallion like his father. He lacks the vocal finesse and stage presence that make Vicente such a galvanizing force." She observed that the mariachi band "looked bored". Emerick however praised his ranchera tunes.

== Critical reception ==
Professional ratings
Review scores
Source	Rating
AllMusic	4.5 stars

On its release, Me Estoy Enamorando was met with positive reviews from music critics. AllMusic editor Terry Jenkins gave the album four-and-a-half out of five stars, calling it a "fine romantic record". John Lannert of Billboard magazine noted that the recording sports "a daring blend of bolero/pop/ranchera sounds". Mario Tarradell of The Dallas Morning News felt that Fernández's vocals "caresse... every song on Me Estoy Enamorando" and praised his delivery. Taradell also complimented the production commenting that the recording "benefits from Mr. Estefan Jr's hallmark production: uncluttered, bright, easy on the ears" as well as Santander's songwriting. On the title track, he compared Fernández to Mexican ranchera singer Javier Solís: " Like Solis, Fernandez can whisper soft and compassionate requests for requited love, and belt out tortured sobs of pain while still retaining a macho posture that says, 'Yes, I'm crying, but I'm not giving up'."

Knight Ridder music critic Howard Cohen gave the album four out of four stars lauding Fernández's vocals and Estefan Jr.'s production. Ramiro Burr's review for the San Antonio Express-News praised the "blend of pop balladry with ranchera rhythms and traditional instruments that elevates this CD". He felt that Fernández "conveys a wealth of emotion in his songs" and called "En El Jardín" a "glorious ballad". Eliseo Cardona of El Nuevo Herald lauded Santander's compositions and called Fernández a "first-rate interpreter who knows how to give a poetic edge to everything that goes through his throat".

=== Accolades ===
At the 40th Annual Grammy Awards in 1998, Me Estoy Enamorando was nominated for Best Latin Pop Performance but lost to Romances by Luis Miguel. At the 10th Annual Lo Nuestro Awards in the same year, Fernández won the awards for Pop Album of the Year, Pop Song of the Year for "Si Tú Supieras", Pop Male Artist of the Year, and Regional Mexican Male Artist of the Year. At the 1998 Premios Eres in Mexico, Fernández won four awards including: Best Popular Singer, Best Disc (for the album), Best Song (for "Si Tú Supieras"), and Best Theme Song. At the 1999 Premios Gardel in Argentina, the recording garnered him the award for Best New Artist.

== Commercial performance ==
In the United States Me Estoy Enamorando debuted at number three on the Billboard Top Latin Albums the week of 11 October 1997. It peaked on top of the chart nine weeks later succeeding Contra la Corriente by Marc Anthony. The album remained in this position for eleven weeks until it was displaced by Ricky Martin's album Vuelve. It later returned to this position the week of 6 June 1998 for one week. The recording also reached number one on the Latin Pop Albums (where it spent a total of sixteen weeks on top of this chart), and peaked at number 125 on the Billboard 200 chart. It ended 1998 as the bestselling Latin album of the year in the US. The album was certified platinum by the RIAA for shipping one million copies. As of October 2017, the record has sold 576,00 copies in the US, making it the 24th bestselling Latin album in the country. By November 1997, the recording had sold over 530,000 copies in Mexico. In Argentina, the album sold 110,000 and was certified platinum by CAPIF after shipping 60,000 copies. As of 2011, in Spain, Me Estoy Enamorando had sold over 70,000 copies and over 2.2 million copies had been sold worldwide.

== Track listing ==
No.	Title	Writer(s)	Length
1.	"Yo Nací Para Amarte"	Kike Santander	4:28
2.	"Si Tú Supieras"	Santander	4:04
3.	"No Sé Olvidar"	Santander	4:21
4.	"En El Jardín" (featuring Gloria Estefan)	Santander	4:50
5.	"Me Estoy Enamorando"	Santander; María Jimena Muñoz	3:18
6.	"Como El Sol y El Trigo"	Santander	3:18
7.	"Noche Triste"	Robert D. Blades; Randal M. Barlow	3:04
8.	"Volverás"	Gloria Estefan; Rafael Ferro	3:47
9.	"Te Juro"	Estefano Salgado	4:46
10.	"Promesa"	Emilio Estefan Jr.; Juan José "Cheito" Quiñonez; Hernán "Teddy" Mulet	3:54

== Personnel ==
Adapted from Me Estoy Enamornado liner notes

=== Musicians ===
- Rachel Carreras – vocals
- Miriam Cuan – vocals
- Willy Pérez-Feria – vocals
- Andy Findon – alto flute
- Sally Ann Ewins – alto flute
- Mike Brittain – Bass
- Paul Cullington – bass
- Chris Laurence – bass
- Robin McGee – bass
- Nicky Orta – bass ("Yo Nací Para Amarte", "Si Tú Supieras", "Me Estoy Enamorando", "Volverás")
- Dave Daniels – cello
- Robin Firman – cello
- Phillip de Grotte – cello
- Paul Kegg – cello
- Frank Schaefer – cello
- Roger Smith – cello
- Gill Thoday – cello
- Chris Van Kampen – cello
- Bill Hawkes – viola
- Garfield Jackson – viola
- Peter Lale – viola
- George Robertson – viola
- Ivo Van der Werff – viola
- Liz Watson – viola
- Héctor Garrido – orchestra conducting
- London Symphony Orchestra – strings
- José Antonio Molina – orchestration
- Randy Barlow – trumpet ("Como El Sol y El Trigo")
- Teddy Mulet – trumpet
- John Pigneguy – trumpet
- Richard Watkins – trumpet
- Cathy Adams – violin
- Roger Garland – violin
- Vaughan Armon – violin
- Howard Ball – violin
- Andrew Bentley – violin
- Mark Berrow – violin
- Tom Bowes – violin
- John Bradbury – violin
- Quentin Crida – violin
- Ben Cruft – violin
- Gill Findlay – violin
- Wilf Gibson – violin
- Boguslav Kostecki – violin
- Jain Mackinnon – violin
- Jim McLeod – violin
- Mike McMeneny – violin
- Perry Montague-Mason – violin
- Dave Nolan – violin
- Peter Oxer – violin
- Maciej Rakowski – violin
- Eddi Roberts – violin
- Sonia Slany – violin
- Rolf Wilson – violin
- Paul Wood – violin
- Gavyn Wright – violin
- Mercedes Abal – flute
- Luis Enrique – percussion (conga, bango, udu)
- David (Tachi) Mora-Arriaga – Guitarrón ("Como El Sol y El Trigo")
- Archie Peña – maracas, drums
- Kike Santander – acoustic guitar, vihuela, keyboard, accordion ("En El Jardín"), percussion ("Volverás"), udu ("Promesa")
- Rafael Solano – percussion ("No Sé Olvidar", "En El Jardín", "Me Estoy Enamorando", "Noche Triste", "Promesa")
- David Theodore – oboe
- René Toledo – Twelve-string guitar ("Yo Nací Para Amarte", "Si Tú Supieras", "No Sé Olvidar", "Promesa")

=== Production ===
- Marcelo Añez – engineer assistant
- César Saldaña Aguas – graphic designer
- Scott Canto – engineer assistant
- Sean Chambers – engineer assistant
- Emilio Estefan – producer
- Javier Garza – engineer, mixing
- Patrice Levinsohn – engineer
- Andrew Melick – photography
- Lester Méndez – keyboard programming
- Steve Menezes – additional engineer
- Freddy Piñero, Jr. – additional engineer
- Kike Santander – producer, arranger
- Eric Shilling – engineer
- Lenda Shonning – make-up artist
- Alicia Vivanco Sodi – art director
- Chris Wiggins – engineer assistant

== Charts ==
=== Weekly charts ===
Chart (1997)	Peak position
US Billboard 200	125
US Top Latin Albums (Billboard)	1
US Latin Pop Albums (Billboard)	1
US Heatseekers Albums (Billboard)	3

=== Year-end charts ===
Chart (1997)	Peak position
US Top Latin Albums (Billboard)	18
US Latin Pop Albums (Billboard)	13

Chart (1998)	Peak position
US Top Latin Albums (Billboard)	1
US Latin Pop Albums (Billboard)	1

== Certifications ==
Region	Certification	Certified units/sales
Argentina (CAPIF)	Platinum	60,000^{^}
Central America (CFC)	8× Platinum	
Chile	Platinum	
Colombia	2× Platinum	
Ecuador	2× Platinum	
Mexico (AMPROFON)	3× Platinum	752,000
Spain (Promusicae)	Gold	50,000^{^}
United States (RIAA)	Platinum	576,000
Venezuela	4× Platinum	
Summaries
Worldwide	—	2,200,000
^{^} Shipments figures based on certification alone.

== See also ==
- 1997 in Latin music
- List of number-one Billboard Top Latin Albums from the 1990s
- List of number-one Billboard Latin Pop Albums from the 1990s
- List of best-selling Latin albums in the United States
- List of best-selling Latin albums
