= A Corazón Abierto =

A Corazón Abierto may refer to:

- A Corazón Abierto (album), by Mexican pop singer Alejandro Fernández
- A corazón abierto (Colombian TV series), adapted from Grey's Anatomy
- A corazón abierto (Mexican TV series), Mexican version of Colombian adaptation of Grey's Anatomy
