= Mi Verdad =

Mi Verdad may refer to one of the following:

- Mi Verdad (album), 1999 album by Alejandro Fernández
- "Mi Verdad" (song), 2015 song by Maná
