= México – Madrid: En Directo y Sin Escalas =

México >> Madrid: En Directo y Sin Escalas

Live album by Alejandro Fernández
- Released: October 25, 2005
- Recorded: June 22, 2005 at El Nuevo Palacio de Congresos (Madrid, España)
- Genre: Latin pop
- Length: 62:54
- Label: Sony BMG
- Producer: Aureo Baqueiro (CD); Álvaro Santamarina (DVD)

Alejandro Fernández chronology
A Corazón Abierto (2004)	México >> Madrid: En Directo y Sin Escalas (2005)	Viento A Favor (2007)

Singles from México – Madrid: En Directo y Sin Escalas
- 1. "Qué Voy a Hacer Con Mi Amor" Released: 2005

México >> Madrid: En Directo y Sin Escalas is the fourteenth album recorded by Mexican singer Alejandro Fernández, a concert made on June 22, 2005, in "El Nuevo Palacio de Congresos" in Madrid, Spain. A spectacular production that counted on the participation of more than 28 musicians in which Alejandro interpreted his biggest successes. Some of the most outstanding moments were the duets with Amaia Montero (from La Oreja de Van Gogh), the Spanish singer Malú and Diego "El Cigala". In words of the same Alejandro: "An unforgettable, very intimate, magical and special concert".

== Track listing ==
=== CD ===
1. Obertura/ Canta corazón (Gian Marco) – 5:06
2. Abrázame (Rafael Ferro García, Julio Iglesias) – 5:23
3. Me dediqué a perderte (dueto con Amaia) (Leonel García) – 4:08
4. Popurrí Juan Gabriel (Juan Gabriel) – 8:04
5. Todo (Leonel García) – 3:39
6. Tantita pena (Kiko Campos, Fernando Riba) – 4:58
7. Como yo te amé (Armando Manzanero) – 3:54
8. Contigo aprendí (dueto con Malú) (Armando Manzanero) – 5:14
9. Qué voy a hacer con mi amor (Luis Carlos Monroy, Raúl Ornelas) – 5:04
10. Como quien pierde una estrella (dueto con Diego "El Cigala") (Humberto Estrada) – 5:46
11. El rey (José Alfredo Jiménez) – 2:40
12. México lindo y querido (Chucho Monge) – 4:05
13. Para vivir (Versión Acústica) (Kike Santander) – 4:53

=== DVD ===
1. Obertura/ Canta corazón
2. Abrázame
3. Me dediqué a perderte (dueto con Amaia)
4. Popurrí Juan Gabriel
5. Todo
6. Tantita pena
7. Como yo te amé
8. Contigo aprendí (dueto con Malú)
9. Granada
10. Qué voy a hacer con mi amor
11. Como quien pierde una estrella (dueto con Diego "El Cigala")
12. El rey
13. México lindo y querido

== Charts ==
=== Album ===
Chart (2005–2008)	Peak position
Spanish Albums Chart	18
US Billboard Top Latin Albums	10
US Billboard Top Latin Pop Albums	5
US Billboard Top Heatseekers	12

=== Singles ===
Year	Chart	Track	Position
2005	Billboard Hot Latin Songs	Que Voy A Hacer Con Mi Amor	31
2005	Billboard Latin Pop Airplay	Que Voy A Hacer Con Mi Amor	5

== Sales and certifications ==
Region	Certification	Certified units/sales
Mexico (AMPROFON)	4× Platinum	400,000^{^}
Mexico (AMPROFON) DVD	3× Gold	30,000^{^}
^{^} Shipments figures based on certification alone.
