= Entre tus brazos =

Entre Tus Brazos

Studio album by Alejandro Fernández
- Released: April 25, 2000
- Recorded: 1999–2000
- Studio: Conway Recording Studios; L.A. FX Recording Studio (Los Angeles, California); Diginote Studios; Crescent Moon Studios; Moon Red Studios (Miami, Florida); Sony Music Mexico (Mexico City, Mexico)
- Genre: Latin pop
- Length: 55:07
- Label: Epic · Sony Discos
- Producer: Emilio Estefan, Jr.; Kike Santander; Jorge Calandrelli; Randall M. Barlow; George Noriega

Alejandro Fernández chronology
Christmas in Vienna VI (1999)	Entre Tus Brazos (2000)	Orígenes (2001)

Singles from Entre Tus Brazos
- 1. "Quiéreme" Released: March 13, 2000; 2. "Agua de Mar" Released: June 5, 2000; 3. "Háblame" Released: July 10, 2000; 4. "Si Te Vas" Released: August 14, 2000; 5. "Quisiera" Released: September 25, 2000; 6. "Siento" Released: November 13, 2000; 7. "Cada Mañana" Released: January 8, 2001; 8. "Enséñame" Released: April 16, 2001

Professional ratings
Review scores
Source	Rating
AllMusic	3/5 stars

Entre Tus Brazos (English: In Your Arms) is the eighth studio album recorded by Mexican performer Alejandro Fernández, It was released by Sony Music Mexico on April 25, 2000 (see 2000 in music) again in collaboration with the famous producer Emilio Estefan, Jr. and Kike Santander, co-produced by Jorge Calandrelli, Randall M. Barlow and George Noriega. This album marks the debut of Alejandro Fernández as a composer with the song "Entre Tus Brazos". He shoot videos for the songs "Quiéreme", "Háblame" and "Quisiera".

The singer received a nomination Latin Grammy Award for Best Male Pop Vocal Performance in the 1st Annual Latin Grammy Awards, on Wednesday, September 13, 2000, losing to Luis Miguel's "Tú Mirada".

== Track listing ==
1. Háblame (Shakira Mebarak) - 4:28
2. Quisiera (Kike Santader) - 4:04
3. Estás Aquí (Kike Santander) - 4:52
4. Quiéreme (Randall Barlow, Angie Chirino, George Noriega) - 4:52
5. Si Te Vas (Kike Santander) - 4:01
6. Nunca Me Arrepiento (Emilio Estefan, Jr.) - 3:28
7. Agua De Mar (Kike Santander) - 4:52
8. Siento (Roberto Blades, Jorge Casas, Angie Chirino, Emilio Estefan, Jr.) - 3:54
9. Entre Tus Brazos (Ximena Díaz, Jorge Estrada, Alejandro Fernández) - 4:28
10. No Será Igual (Kike Santander) - 4:32
11. Cada Mañana (Francisco Céspedes) - 3:21
12. Te Llevo Guardada (Kike Santander) - 4:12
13. Enséñame (Kike Santander) - 3:58

== Chart performance ==
=== Album ===
Chart (2000)	Peak position
Billboard 200	144
Billboard Top Latin Albums	1
Billboard Latin Pop Albums	1
Billboard Heatseekers	4

=== Singles ===
Year	Chart	Track	Peak
2000	Billboard Hot Latin Songs	Quiéreme	3
2000	Billboard Latin Pop Airplay	Quiéreme	2
2000	Billboard Latin Regional Mexican Airplay	Quiéreme	37
2000	Billboard Latin Tropical/Salsa Airplay	Quiéreme	5
2000	Billboard Bubbling Under Hot 100 Singles	Quiéreme	17
2000	Billboard Latin Tropical/Salsa Airplay	Si Te Vas	7
2000	Billboard Hot Latin Songs	Si Te Vas	4
2000	Billboard Latin Pop Airplay	Si Te Vas	2
2000	Billboard Latin Pop Airplay	Agua De Mar	26

== Sales and certifications ==
Region	Certification	Certified units/sales
Mexico (AMPROFON)	Platinum+Gold	225,000^{^}
United States (RIAA)	2× Platinum (Latin)	200,000^{^}
^{^} Shipments figures based on certification alone.
