= En Vivo: Juntos Por Ultima Vez =

En Vivo: Juntos Por Última Vez

Live album by Vicente y Alejandro Fernández
- Released: October 14, 2003
- Recorded: 2003
- Genre: Mariachi
- Length: 46:23 (Disco 1); 63:39 (Disco 2)
- Label: Sony Music
- Producer: Gerardo Fernández, Anna García, Richard Herrera

Vicente Fernández chronology
Se Me Hizo Tarde La Vida (2003)	En Vivo: Juntos Por Ultima Vez (2003)	Mis Duetos (2005)

Alejandro Fernández chronology
Niña Amada Mía (2003)	En Vivo: Juntos Por Última Vez (2003)	A Corazón Abierto (2004)

En Vivo: Juntos Por Última Vez (Live: Together for the Last Time) is the twelfth album by Mexican singer Alejandro Fernández. Recorded live in concert with his father Vicente Fernández, it concluded their extensive tour that took them throughout Latin America. The final concert that lasted more than five hours was held at the Foro Sol in Mexico City which housed over 60,000 people.

== Track listing ==
=== Disc 1 ===
1. Donde Vas Tan Sola (Manuel Monterrosas) – 3:19
2. Loco / Si He Sabido Amor (Jorge Massias / Humberto Estrada) – 3:46
3. Nube Viajera (Jorge Massias) – 3:52
4. Cascos Ligeros (Manuel Eduardo Castro) – 2:31
5. Que Digan Misa (Manuel Eduardo Castro) – 2:32
6. A Pesar De Todo (Augusto Algueró, Antonio Guijarro) – 5:12
7. Una Noche Como Esta (Manuel Eduardo Castro) – 3:13
8. Si Acaso Vuelves (Homero Aguilar, Rosendo Montiel) – 3:19
9. La Tienda (Manuel Eduardo Toscano) – 3:17
10. Lastima Que Seas Ajena (Jorge Massias) – 4:19
11. Aca Entre Nos (Martín Urieta) – 4:06
12. Bohemio De Aficion (Martín Urieta) – 3:26
13. Amor De Los Dos (Dueto) (Gilberto Parra) – 3:31

=== Disc 2 ===
1. Que Seas Muy Feliz (Manuel Monterrosas) – 3:23
2. Es La Mujer (Alberto Chávez) – 3:31
3. No (Armando Manzanero) – 3:21
4. Abrazame (Rafael Ferro García, Julio Iglesias) – 4:05
5. Matalas (Manuel Eduardo Toscano) – 3:01
6. Como Quien Pierde Una Estrella (Humberto Estrada) – 6:29
7. Golondrina Sin Nido (Dueto) (Víctor Cordero) – 4:41
8. De Que Manera Te Olvido (Federico Méndez) – 2:50
9. De Un Rancho A Otro (Chucho Nila) – 2:32
10. Las Llaves De Mi Alma (Vicente Fernández) – 3:02
11. Mujeres Divinas (Martín Urieta) – 3:23
12. El Ayudante (Manuel Eduardo Toscano) – 3:01
13. Me Voy A Quitar De En Medio (Manuel Monterrosas) – 3:00
14. Perdon (Dueto) (Pedro Flores) – 3:55
15. Cuando Yo Queria Ser Grande (Manuel Monterrosas) – 3:41
16. Mi Vejez (Martín Urieta) – 4:37
17. Volver Volver (Dueto) (Fernando Z. Maldonado) – 3:43
18. Las Golondrinas (D.A.R.) – 1:24

== Chart performance ==
=== Album ===
Chart (2003)	Peak position
Billboard Regional Mexican Albums	1
Billboard Top Latin Albums	4
Billboard The Billboard 200	196
Billboard Top Heatseekers	7

=== Singles ===
Year	Chart	Track	Peak
2003	Billboard Hot Latin Songs	Amor De Los Dos (Dueto)	23
2003	Billboard Latin Regional Mexican Airplay	Amor De Los Dos (Dueto)	7

== Sales and certifications ==
Region	Certification	Certified units/sales
Mexico (AMPROFON)	2× Platinum+Gold	250,000^{^}
^{^} Shipments figures based on certification alone.
