= Dos Mundos: Evolución + Tradición =

Studio album by Alejandro Fernández
- Released: December 8, 2009
- Recorded: 2008–2009
- Studios: Brava! Music (Mexico City, Mexico); Eareye Studios (Miami, Florida); Audiovisión Studios (Bogotá, Colombia); Igloo Music; Pinchón Studios (Buenos Aires, Argentina)
- Genre: Latin pop · regional Mexican
- Length: (Evolución) 43:24 (Tradición) 40:00
- Label: Fonovisa
- Producers: (Evolución) Áureo Baqueiro · Kike Santander · Julio C. Reyes (Tradición) Joan Sebastian

Alejandro Fernández chronology
De Noche: Clásicos a Mi Manera (2008)	Dos Mundos: Evolución + Tradición (2009)	Confidencias (2013)

Singles from Dos Mundos: Evolucíon
- 1. "Se Me Va la Voz" Released: October 5, 2009; 2. "Me Hace Tanto Bien" Released: January 11, 2010; 3. "Cuando Digo Tu Nombre (Mejor)" Released: May 3, 2010

Dos Mundos: Tradición

Singles from Dos Mundos: Tradición
- 1. "Estuve" Released: October 5, 2009; 2. "Bandida" Released: January 11, 2010; 3. "Mi Rechazo" Released: May 3, 2010

Dos Mundos: Evolución + Tradición is the 13th and 14th studio album recorded by Mexican performer Alejandro Fernández, It was released by Fonovisa on December 8, 2009 (see 2009 in music).

== Album information ==
Dos Mundos is a double album by Alejandro Fernández featuring two different genres on each album. Dos Mundos: Evolución features songs recorded in Latin pop, while Dos Mundos: Tradición features songs recorded in regional Mexican. The two albums were sold both separately and bundled together under the title, Dos Mundos: Evolución + Tradición, making Fernández one of few Latin artist to do something similar.

== Reception ==
Professional ratings
Review scores
Source	Rating
Allmusic (Evolución)	4/5 stars
Allmusic (Tradición)	3.5/5 stars
About.com (Both)	5/5 stars

Regarding Dos Mundos: Evolución, James Monger of Allmusic gave the album a four-star rating and noted the album "relies on the glossy, straight-up Latin pop with elements of ballad, bolero, and mariachi that became his forte in the early 20th century". For Dos Mundos: Tradición, Alex Henderson gave the 3.5 out of 5 and compared the decision of Fernandez's to produce two albums by the same manner of Rocío Banquells. For the latter album, he called a "likable effort whether one is enjoying it as a stand-alone CD or as half of the double-disc Dos Mundos: Evolución y Tradición". Tijana Ilich of About.com gave both albums a five-star rating a called Evolución "Smooth, heartfelt, lyrically interesting pop" and "a good mix, expertly executed" for the musical genres of Tradición.

== Track listing ==
Dos Mundos: Evolución
No.	Title	Writer(s)	Length
1.	"Me Hace Tanto Bien"	Donato Póveda · Pedro Dabdoub Sánchez · Carlos Law	3:09
2.	"Cuando Digo Tu Nombre (Mejor)"	Leonel García	3:18
3.	"Se Me Va la Voz"	Roy Tabaré	4:00
4.	"Cómo Me Duele (Cielo de Acuarela)"	Mario Domm	4:00
5.	"Tu Amor Perdí"	Pedro Dabdoub Sánchez · Carlos Law	3:47
6.	"Dibujando Un Corazón (Más Allá)"	Gian Marco Zignago	3:45
7.	"De Nada Sirve Hablar"	Gian Marco Zignago	3:01
8.	"No Lo Beses"	José Luis Ortega · Andreas Zanetti · Lex Jano	3:35
9.	"Una Lágrima En El Corazón"	Kike Santander	3:59
10.	"Imagina"	Gian Marco Zignago	3:50
11.	"Mañana Es Para Siempre"	Jorge Eduardo Murguía Pedraza · Mauricio López de Arriaga Hernández	3:35
Total length:			43:24

All tracks are written by Joan Sebastian, except where noted.

Dos Mundos: Tradición
No.	Title	Writer(s)	Length
1.	"Pecadora"		3:48
2.	"Me Dueles"		3:00
3.	"Estuve"		3:20
4.	"Unas Nalgadas"		2:39
5.	"Bandida"		3:37
6.	"Nada de Tí"		3:08
7.	"La Seven (featuring Joan Sebastian)"		3:18
8.	"La Historia Que No"		3:28
9.	"Ya Sé Acabó"		2:51
10.	"Mi Rechazo"	Marco Antonio Solís	3:34
11.	"Maldita Costumbre"		3:06
Total length:			40:00

Dos Mundos: Evolución + Tradición Disc 1
No.	Title	Writer(s)	Length
12.	"Celebración de Amor"	Áureo Baqueiro	3:38

== Charts ==
Chart performance for Dos Mundos: Evolución
Chart (2009–2010)	Peak position
Spanish Albums (Promusicae)	3
US Billboard 200	175
US Top Latin Albums (Billboard)	1
US Latin Pop Albums (Billboard)	1

Chart performance for Dos Mundos: Tradición
Chart (2009–2010)	Peak position
Spanish Albums (Promusicae)	40
US Billboard 200	183
US Top Latin Albums (Billboard)	3
US Regional Mexican Albums (Billboard)	1

== Sales and certifications ==
Region	Certification	Certified units/sales
Chile	Gold	
Colombia	4× Platinum	
Mexico (AMPROFON) for Dos Mundos: Evolución	2× Platinum+Gold	150,000^{^}
Mexico (AMPROFON) for Dos Mundos: Tradición	2× Platinum	120,000^{^}
Spain (Promusicae) for Dos Mundos: Evolución	Platinum	60,000^{^}
United States (RIAA)	4× Platinum (Latin)	240,000^{‡}
^{^} Shipments figures based on certification alone.^{‡} Sales+streaming figures based on certification alone.

== See also ==
- List of number-one albums of 2010 (Mexico)
- List of number-one Billboard Latin Albums from the 2010s
