= Orígenes =

Studio album by Alejandro Fernández
- Released: September 25, 2001
- Recorded: 2001
- Genre: Mariachi
- Length: 55:10
- Label: Sony
- Producer: Kiko Campos, Pedro Ramírez, Alejandro Fernández (executive)

Alejandro Fernández chronology
Entre tus brazos (2000)	Orígenes (2001)	Un Canto de México (2002)

Singles from Orígenes
- 1. "Ingrato Amor" Released: 2001; 2. "Tanita Pena" Released: 2001; 3. "Si Tu No Vuelves" Released: 2001

Professional ratings
Review scores
Source	Rating
Allmusic	3/5 stars

Orígenes is the ninth studio album recorded by Mexican singer Alejandro Fernández. Produced by Kiko Campos and Pedro Ramírez, with this album he returns to his "origins" recording an album of Mexican music, but this time with his own style. He shot videos for the songs "Tantita Pena" and "Si Tú No Vuelves".

The singer received a Latin Grammy nomination for Best Ranchero Album in the Latin Grammy Awards of 2002; however, he lost to his father Vicente Fernández with the album Más con el Número Uno. Orígenes also was nominated for a 2002 Lo Nuestro Award for Pop Album of the Year.

== Track listing ==
1. Tantita Pena (Kiko Campos, Fernando Riba) – 3:28
2. Si Tu No Vuelves (Fato) – 3:14
3. Amor De Luna (Kiko Campos, Fernando Riba) – 3:05
4. ¡Ay Amor! (Manuel Monterrosas) – 2:30
5. Como Pez En El Agua (Jorge Massias) – 3:19
6. ¿Donde Vas Tan Sola? (Manuel Monterrosas) – 2:51
7. Duerme Tranquila (Fato) – 3:29
8. Tu Desvario (Kiko Campos, Fernando Riba) – 4:06
9. Jamas Te Vi Tan Linda (Roberto Cantoral) – 3:42
10. Pajaro Perdido (Nicolas Urquiza) – 3:36
11. El Monstruo (Fato) – 4:17
12. Ingrato Amor (Kiko Campos, Fernando Riba) – 3:14
13. Tu Regresaras (Manuel Monterrosas) – 2:35
- Bonus Track: Las Mañanitas

== Charts ==
=== Album ===
Chart (2001)	Peak position
Billboard Latin Pop Albums	1
Billboard Top Latin Albums	2
Billboard Heatseekers	18

=== Singles ===
Year	Chart	Track	Peak
2001	Billboard Hot Latin Songs	Tantita Pena	1
2001	Billboard Latin Regional Mexican Airplay	Tantita Pena	11
2001	Billboard Latin Pop Airplay	Tantita Pena	4
2001	Billboard Latin Tropical/Salsa Airplay	Tantita Pena	5
2001	Billboard Bubbling Under Hot 100 Singles	Tantita Pena	12
2002	Billboard Latin Pop Airplay	Si Tu No Vuelves	17
2002	Billboard Hot Latin Songs	Si Tu No Vuelves	27

== Sales and certifications ==
Region	Certification	Certified units/sales
Mexico (AMPROFON)	2× Platinum	300,000^{^}
United States (RIAA)	2× Platinum (Latin)	200,000^{^}
^{^} Shipments figures based on certification alone.
