= Niña Amada Mía =

Studio album by Alejandro Fernández
- Released: March 11, 2003
- Recorded: 2002–2003
- Genre: Mariachi
- Length: 41:28
- Label: Sony Discos
- Producer: Pedro Ramírez

Alejandro Fernández chronology
Un Canto de México (2002)	Niña Amada Mía (2003)	En Vivo: Juntos Por Ultima Vez (2003)

Singles from Niña Amada Mía
- 1. "Niña Amada Mía" Released: January 20, 2003

Niña Amada Mía is the tenth studio album recorded by Mexican singer Alejandro Fernández. Produced by Pedro Ramírez, it is a mariachi album that contains melodies of composers like Armando Manzanero and Jorge Massias. He shot a video for the song "Niña Amada Mia".

== Track listing ==
1. "Por Que No Estas Conmigo" (Homero Aguilar) – 4:11
2. "Como Quisiera" (Jorge Massias) – 3:44
3. "Que Poca" (Luis Elizalde) – 3:29
4. "Me Esta Matando Este Amor" (Armando Manzanero) – 3:28
5. "Mujer" (Juan Alazán) – 4:39
6. "Que Valga La Pena" (Manuel Eduardo Toscano) – 2:44
7. "Por Aqui Paso" (Jorge Massias) – 3:25
8. "Niña Amada Mia" (Jorge Massias) – 3:14
9. "La Mujer Ideal" (Manuel Eduardo Toscano) – 2:52
10. "Dejame" (Raxu) – 3:30
11. "La Reina Es El Rey" (Gregorio Hernández Mendoza) – 3:15
12. "Matalas" (Manuel Eduardo Toscano) – 2:57

== Charts ==
=== Album ===
Chart (2003)	Peak position
Billboard Regional Mexican Albums	10
Billboard Top Latin Albums	22

=== Singles ===
Year	Chart	Track	Peak
2003	Billboard Hot Latin Songs	Niña Amada Mia	17
2003	Billboard Latin Pop Airplay	Niña Amada Mia	9

== Sales and certifications ==
Region	Certification	Certified units/sales
Mexico (AMPROFON)	Platinum	150,000^{^}
^{^} Shipments figures based on certification alone.
