= A Corazón Abierto (album) =

Studio album by Alejandro Fernández
- Released: September 7, 2004
- Recorded: 2004
- Genre: Latin pop
- Length: 53:48
- Language: Spanish
- Label: Columbia
- Producers: Kike Santander; Áureo Baqueiro

Alejandro Fernández chronology
En Vivo: Juntos Por Ultima Vez (2003)	A Corazón Abierto (2004)	México - Madrid: En Directo Y Sin Escalas (2005)

Singles from A Corazón Abierto
- 1. "Me Dediqué A Perderte" Released: 2004; 2. "Canta Corazón" Released: 2004; 3. "Qué Lástima" Released: 2005; 4. "Que Voy a Hacer Con Mi Amor" Released: 2005

A Corazón Abierto (English: Open Heart) is the eleventh studio album by Mexican singer Alejandro Fernández. Released on September 7, 2004, via Columbia Records, it was produced by Kike Santander and Áureo Baqueiro. The album is often regarded as Fernández's debut into contemporary pop, straying away from his previous roots in mariachi and ranchera music. The first single, "Me Dediqué a Perderte" sold over 63,000 digital downloads in Mexico.

== Reception ==
The album garnered mainly positive reception. Jason Birchmeier of AllMusic described the album as a "batch of well-crafted songs", further stating, "relative to his previous pop albums, though, Fernández sounds more at ease on A Corazón Abierto, as if he's truly enjoying himself and singing from the heart. That he sounds more at home makes A Corazón Abierto perhaps his best pop album to date".

== Track listing ==
=== CD ===
Source: Official Website

No.	Title	Writer(s)	Length
1.	"Para Vivir"	Kike Santander	4:11
2.	"Me Dediqué A Perderte"	Leonel García	3:54
3.	"Canta Corazón"	Gian Marco	4:14
4.	"Qué Voy a Hacer Con Mi Amor"	Luis Carlos Monroy, Raúl Ornelas	4:08
5.	"Si Alguna Vez"	Kike Santander	4:15
6.	"Que Lástima"	Jaime Flores	4:23
7.	"Tengo Ganas"	Gian Marco	3:36
8.	"Se Va"	Gustavo Santander, Kike Santander	3:25
9.	"Lo Que Pudo Ser"	Reyli Barba, Jaime Flores	4:24
10.	"Me Iré"	Christian Leuzzi, Kike Santander	4:08
11.	"Dame Un Minuto"	Gian Marco	4:21
12.	"Muy Lejos De Ti"	Bernardo Ossa, Omar Sánchez, Kike Santander	4:20
13.	"Me Dediqué A Perderte" (versión salsa) (Hidden Track)	Leonel García	4:32

=== DVD ===
1. Me Dediqué A Perderte (Video)
2. Alejandro – De Gira
3. Cronología
4. Lucharé Por Tu Amor (Video)

== Personnel ==
- Pablo Alfaro – photography
- Esteban Aristizabal – vocal engineer
- Pablo Arraya – engineer, vocal engineer
- Aureo Baqueiro – percussion, arranger, keyboards, programming, producer, engineer, fender rhodes, vocal arrangement, string arrangements, art direction, direction, A&R
- Daniel Betancourt – arranger, keyboards, programming, producer
- Gustavo Borner – mixing, string engineer
- Richard Bravo – percussion
- Rodrigo Cárdenas – bass
- Jason Carder – trumpet
- Luis Angel Cortez – assistant
- Mike Couzzi – string engineer
- Ian Cuttler – art direction, design
- Pepe Damián – drums
- Fernando de Santiago – vihuela
- Beto Dominguez – percussion
- Vicky Echeverri – chorus
- Paul Forat – art direction, A&R
- Luis Gil – drum engineering
- Manny López – acoustic guitar
- Bill Meyers – string arrangements
- Miami Symphonic Strings – strings
- Boris Milan – mixing
- Sergio Minski – production coordination
- José Antonio Molina – string arrangements
- Marco Moreno – assistant, pro-tools
- Novi Novag – viola, string arrangements
- Alfredo Oliva – concert comedian
- Daniel Ortega – electric guitar
- Wendy Pederson – chorus
- Richie Perez – engineer
- Pancho Ruiz – electric bass
- Milton Salcedo – piano, arranger, keyboards, programming, producer, fender rhodes, wind arrangements
- Freddie Sandoval – engineer
- Kike Santander – acoustic guitar, arranger, producer, Spanish guitar, wind arrangements
- Marco Antonio Santiago – guitarron
- Dana Teboe – trumpet
- Ramiro Teran – chorus, engineer
- Don C. Tyler – mastering
- Juan Jose Virviescas – engineer

== Chart performance ==
=== Album ===
Chart (2004)	Peak position
US Billboard 200	125
US Billboard Top Latin Albums	2
US Billboard Latin Pop Albums	1
US Billboard Top Heatseekers	3

=== Singles ===
Year	Chart	Track	Peak
2004	Billboard Bubbling Under Hot 100 Singles	Me Dediqué A Perderte	6
2004	Billboard Hot Latin Songs	Me Dediqué A Perderte	1
2004	Billboard Latin Regional Mexican Airplay	Me Dediqué A Perderte	10
2004	Billboard Latin Pop Airplay	Me Dediqué A Perderte	2
2004	Billboard Latin Tropical Airplay	Me Dediqué A Perderte	4
2004	Billboard Hot Latin Songs	Qué Lástima	15
2005	Billboard Latin Pop Airplay	Qué Lástima	10
2005	Billboard Hot Latin Songs	Canta Corazón	24
2005	Billboard Latin Pop Airplay	Canta Corazón	9

== Sales and certifications ==
Region	Certification	Certified units/sales
Argentina (CAPIF)	Gold	20,000^{^}
Mexico (AMPROFON)	3× Platinum+Gold	350,000^{^}
United States	—	250,000
^{^} Shipments figures based on certification alone.
