= Alejandro Fernández =

Mexican singer (born 1971)

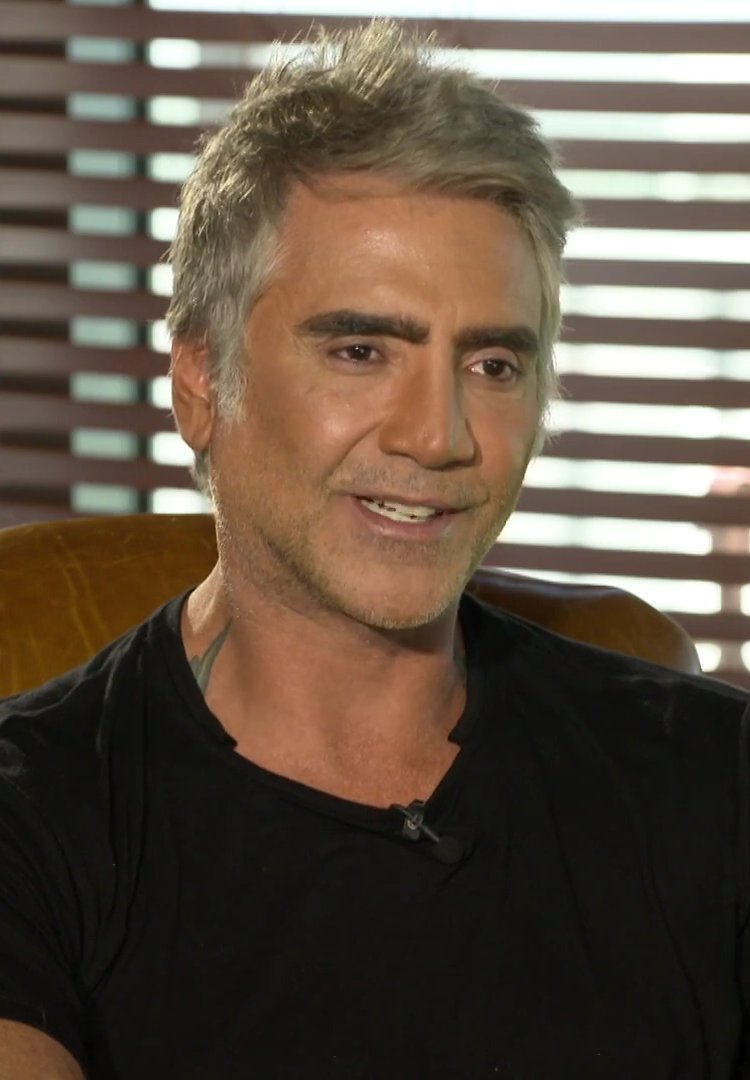
- Fernández in 2021
- Born: Alejandro Fernández Abarca; 24 April 1971 (age 55); Guadalajara, Jalisco, Mexico
- Other name: El Potrillo ("The Colt")
- Occupation: Singer
- Works: Discography
- Spouse: América Guinart (m. 1992; div. 1998)
- Children: 5
- Relatives: Vicente Fernández (father)
- Musical career
- Genres: Mariachi; Latin pop
- Instruments: Vocals; guitar
- Years active: 1976–present
- Labels: Universal Latin; Sony Mexico
- Website: alejandrofernandez.com

Alejandro Fernández Abarca (Spanish pronunciation: [aleˈxandɾo feɾˈnandes aˈβaɾka]; born 24 April 1971) is a Mexican singer. Born in Guadalajara, Jalisco, he is the son of the Mexican singer Vicente Fernández. Nicknamed as "El Potrillo" by the media and his fans, he has sold over 20 million records worldwide, making him one of the best-selling Latin music artists. He originally specialized in traditional, earthy forms of Mexican folk, such as mariachi and charro, until he successfully branched out into pop music. Over the course of his career, he has been awarded four Latin Grammy Awards and a star on the Hollywood Walk of Fame.

== Career ==
=== Early years ===
Alejandro Fernández was born in Guadalajara, Jalisco. His first appearance in the spectacular presentation was in 1976; in one of his father's shows.

Fernández released his first album Alejandro Fernández under Sony Music. Its main hits were "Necesito olvidarla", "Brumas" and "Equivocadamente". With this material, Alejandro began a tour in Mexico and some cities of the United States. In 1993, he performed with his father in a concert at the Palacio de los Deportes, and he continued for a season at the Teatro Blanquita in Mexico City. The same year Alejandro released the successful Piel de Niña, produced by Pedro Ramírez. The songs "Piel de Niña", "A La Vera del Camino", and "Cascos Ligeros" were some of the main hits on the album. At the Lo Nuestro Awards of 1993 Fernández was nominated for Male Artist, New Artist and Regional Mexican Album of the Year for his debut album, winning none.

In 1994 he released the album Grandes Éxitos a la Manera de Alejandro Fernández, covering pieces from legendary composers such as Armando Manzanero, Luis Demetrio and Agustín Lara. At the 9th Lo Nuestro Awards, Fernández received a nomination for Regional Mexican Male Performer of the Year.

=== 1995–1998: Que Seas Muy Feliz, Me Estoy Enamorando ===
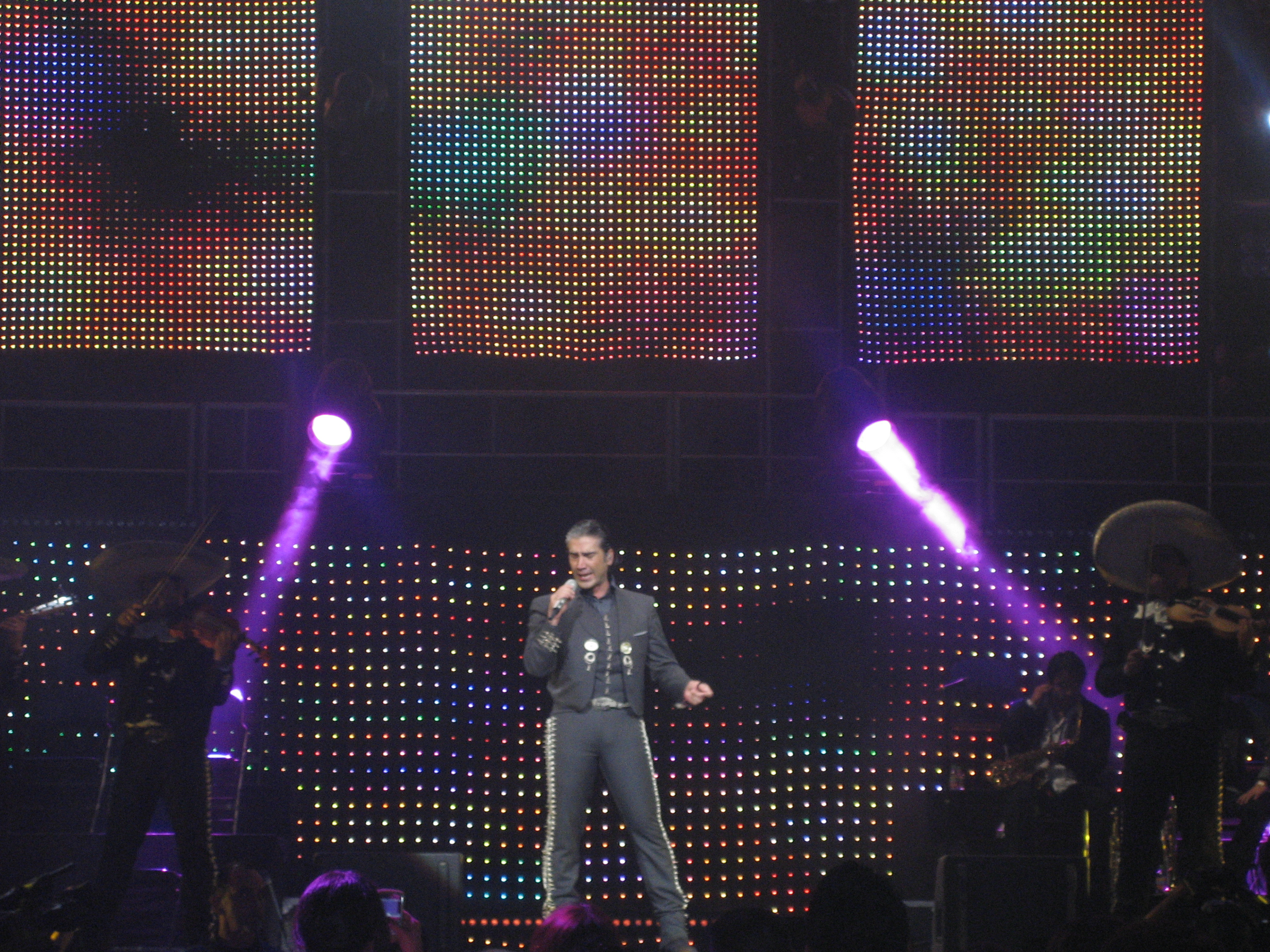
Mexican singer Alejandro Fernandez in concert.

In 1995, he released the album Que Seas Muy Feliz. The song "Como Quien Pierde Una Estrella" became his first international hit. It was heavily promoted on radio and television shows.

In 1996, his release Muy Dentro de Mi Corazón was an instant success. Songs like "Moño Negro", "Nube Viajera" and "Abrazame" became hits in Mexico and several countries in Latin America. That same year he recorded "Puedes Llegar", the theme song for the 1996 Atlanta Olympics, with singers Gloria Estefan, Jon Secada and Ricky Martin, among others. In 1997, he recorded the album Me Estoy Enamorando, produced by Emilio Estefan, Jr. The album is a fusion of bolero, romantic ballad, orchestral arrangements and elements of Mexican mariachi that became popular in the Latin music sector. "Si Tú Supieras" was the most successful hit of that production, and it was chosen as the theme of the hit soap opera of the time, "Maria Isabel". It also conquered the U.S. market, lasting seven weeks at the top of Billboard Hot Latin Tracks. He became the first Latin singer to hold first place with three hits: "Si tu supieras" was followed by "En El Jardín" (with Gloria Estefan) and "No Sé Olvidar". Me Estoy Enamorando sold 2.2 million copies worldwide and was nominated for Best Latin Pop Performance at the 40th Annual Grammy Awards. In December 1998, he recorded Christmas in Vienna VI with the tenor Plácido Domingo and Patricia Kaas. His performance was praised by critics but it did not achieve much popularity among the audience.

=== 1999–2003: Mi Verdad, Entre Tus Brazos, Orígenes ===
With the album Mi Verdad of 1999, Fernández returned to ranchera music. Mi Verdad was nominated for Best Mexican-American performance at the 42nd annual Grammy Awards. "Si He Sabido Amor" became a big hit and was the theme of the hit soap opera Infierno en el Paraíso.

In 2000, he released the album Entre tus brazos, the eighth in his career and the second one with Emilio Estefan, Jr. as the producer. "Quiéreme" was the first single, a fast-tempo pop song that showed his musical versatility. For the first time in his career, he included a song from his own inspiration: "Entre Tus Brazos". The album contains mostly romantic ballads with energetic Latin rhythms. That same year, he and Julio Iglesias recorded the song "Dos Corazones, Dos Historias;" it appeared on Julio's album Noche de Cuatro Lunas.

In 2001, he recorded Orígenes. The single "Tantina Pena" (a flamenco-style mariachi bolero) became an international hit. In 2002, he launched his production Un Canto De México, which contains twenty-two classic ranchera songs. It was recorded live at the Palacio de Bellas Artes. In 2003, Alejandro began a Latin American tour with his father Vicente, and recorded the show called "En Vivo: Juntos Por Ultima Vez", which was witnessed by thousands of fans, culminating in Mexico City at the Foro Sol, with over five hours of music in front of nearly 60,000 spectators. That same year he recorded his next album Niña amada mía. The title song became a hit and the theme of a popular soap opera of the same name. That same year, Alejandro toured Latin America and the United States. Later he participated in the Christmas special En mi país, recorded in Puerto Rico and broadcast by Telemundo. Fernández and Ednita Nazario performed a duet of "Triste Navidad" ("Sad Christmas").

=== 2004–2006: A Corazón Abierto, México – Madrid ===
In 2004, he played the lead role in Zapata: El sueño del héroe, a movie about the Mexican revolutionary hero Emiliano Zapata by filmmaker Alfonso Arau. That same year, A Corazón Abierto reunited Alejandro with Grammy-winning producer and songwriter Kike Santander, who penned his greatest hits from Me Estoy Enamorando. He also recruited multiple talented younger songwriters, including Gian Marco, Leonel García (of pop duo Sin Bandera), Reyli Barba (former member of pop band Elefante) and Mexican group Tres De Copas.

"Romanticism is something that will never die", declared Alejandro Fernández, explaining his choice of songs on A Corazón Abierto, his breakthrough recording about lost love, love that is never forgotten and the capacity to always love again. "I'm super, ultra passionate. We're releasing an album that's an x-ray of myself. That's why it's titled "A Corazón Abierto" ("In Open Heart"). It was something very honest. Not naked, but something deeper than that". The album released the singles: "¿Que voy a hacer con mi amor?", "Qué lastima", "Me dediqué a perderte" and the smash hit "Canta corazón".

In 2005, Alejandro released México - Madrid: En Directo Y Sin Escalas (Mexico – Madrid: Nonstop), featuring 13 tracks including one new song. Produced by Aureo Baquiero and filmed in front of a live audience at Spain's "Palacio de Congresos IFEMA", the production features Fernández performing some of his biggest hits accompanied by a 28-piece orchestra and some of Spain's most important voices on three of the songs: Amaia Montero from La Oreja de Van Gogh joins him on "Me dediqué a perderte"; Malú duets with him on "Contigo aprendí", and with flamenco star Diego El Cigala perform a fast-tempo version of "Como quien pierde una estrella", accompanied on cajón by famed flamenco guitarist Niño Josele. That same year, Alejandro was chosen to sing along with the tenors José Carreras and Plácido Domingo in a special concert celebrating the opening of the "Forum Internacional de las Culturas" in Monterrey. At first his father Vicente was invited but he turned it down. Alejandro showed his skilled vocals and operatic tenor range, singing pieces of opera such as "Granada"; his performance was praised by the audience. He also recorded a duet with the tenor Mario Frangoulis called "Hay más" from the album Follow Your Heart. After that, Alejandro went on tour with two Latin American stars: Marc Anthony and Chayanne, passing through several major U.S. cities. On 2 December 2005, Los Angeles, gave him a star on the legendary Hollywood Walk of Fame on Hollywood Boulevard.

=== 2007–2010: Viento a Favor, Dos Mundos ===
In 2007, he released Viento A Favor featuring tunes written by Leonel García and Noel Schajris (better known as emotive Latin-pop duo Sin Bandera) and Mexican singer Reyli Barba. The first two singles were "Te Voy A Perder", and "Amor Gitano", a duet with Beyoncé. After that "Cuando Estamos Juntos" and "No Se Me Hace Fácil", became hits; "Eres" was the last single of the album.

In 2008, Alejandro started a tour in Spain, covering cities such as Madrid, Valencia and A Coruña. He released the album De Noche: Clásicos A Mi Manera; it features classic romantic ballads and boleros such as "El Reloj" and "Regálame esta noche", songs that he recorded previously but never released.

In 2009, his voice was the theme of Mañana es para siempre, the most successful Mexican soap opera of the year. The Grammy-winning singer, composer and producer Nelly Furtado invited Alejandro to perform in a duet for her album Mi Plan. The song "Sueños" was recorded in Miami.

Dos Mundos (Two Worlds), is a double production, releasing two albums simultaneously: Dos Mundos: Evolución + Tradición. One of them is pop, produced by Aureo Baqueiro, and the other is ranchera and mariachi, produced by Joan Sebastian. No Latin artist had done anything similar before. On 11 November 2009 he simultaneously released the videos of the singles "Estuve" and "Se Me Va la Voz". He released the videos of the singles "Me Hace Tanto Bien" and "Bandida". On 22 November 2010, Alejandro released the live album Dos Mundos: Revolución that includes live versions of songs from his album Dos mundos: Evolución / Dos mundos: Tradición, two unreleased tracks "Tu Sabes Quien", "Felicidades" and the song "Vamos a darnos tiempo" originally performed by the iconic singer José José.

=== 2011–2017: "Hoy Tengo Ganas de Ti", Confidencias, Rompiendo Fronteras ===
Between June and August 2011, he went on his Dos Mundos: Revolucion Tour. On 1 August 2011, Alejandro released the song "El mismo sol", which was released as the theme of the 2011 Pan American Games. He toured Latin America along with fellow singer Marc Anthony in a series of concerts named Dos Mundos, un Concierto (Two Worlds, one Concert). Alejandro collaborated with Christina Aguilera on a cover of the song "Hoy Tengo Ganas de Ti", released as the theme song for the soap opera "La tempestad". After only 17 days, the song was certified platinum in Mexico, with 65,000 sales from digital downloads. On 27 August 2013, he released the album Confidencias. It includes the duet with Christina Aguilera, along with duets with Vicente Fernández and Rod Stewart. In 2014, his song "Te Amare" was released as the theme song for the soap opera "Hasta el fin del mundo" replacing the original theme of Pedro Fernández. In 2015, Alejandro collaborated with Alejandro Sanz on a cover of the song "A que no me dejas", released as the theme song for the soap opera A que no me dejas. In 2016, Fernández was inducted into the Billboard Latin Music Hall of Fame. In February 2017, he released the album Rompiendo Fronteras and the single "Sé que te duele" became an instant hit.

=== 2023: Amor y Patria ===
In 2023 Fernandez announced the tour named "Amor y Patria" (Love and Motherland in Spanish). His tour started in California, and included performances in Texas.

=== Sony Music controversy ===
The international record label Sony Music was sued by Alejandro Fernández after they tried to release an album with some of his unreleased songs after his contract with the label had ended. Federal Police arrived at the Sony headquarters in Mexico City and seized about 6,000 copies of the album. The song "Diferente", was released on the internet as the first single of the album.

== Artistry ==
Following the steps of his father, Fernández began his musical career focusing on ranchera music. Since his 1997 album Me Estoy Enamorando he has branched out successfully into pop music. In his live presentations, he begins the show with his ranchera repertoire, then removes his charro outfit to perform pop songs.

Fernández has a baritone tessitura. His vocal ability and versatility have allowed him to perform romantic ballads, pop and ranchera music simultaneously. He has performed with artists such as Plácido Domingo, Marc Anthony, José Carreras, Chayanne, Amaia Montero, Joan Sebastian, Gloria Estefan, Malú, Ha*Ash, Julio Iglesias, Patricia Kaas, Miguel Bosé, Mario Frangoulis, Ednita Nazario, Yuri, Franco De Vita, Diego El Cigala, Nelly Furtado, Beyoncé, Christina Aguilera, Rod Stewart, Morat, Los Tigres del Norte, Sebastián Yatra, David Bisbal, Christian Nodal, Héctor Acosta, Calibre 50, Mon Laferte as well as family members; his father Vicente Fernández, his daughter Camila Fernández, and his son Alex Fernández.

== Personal life ==
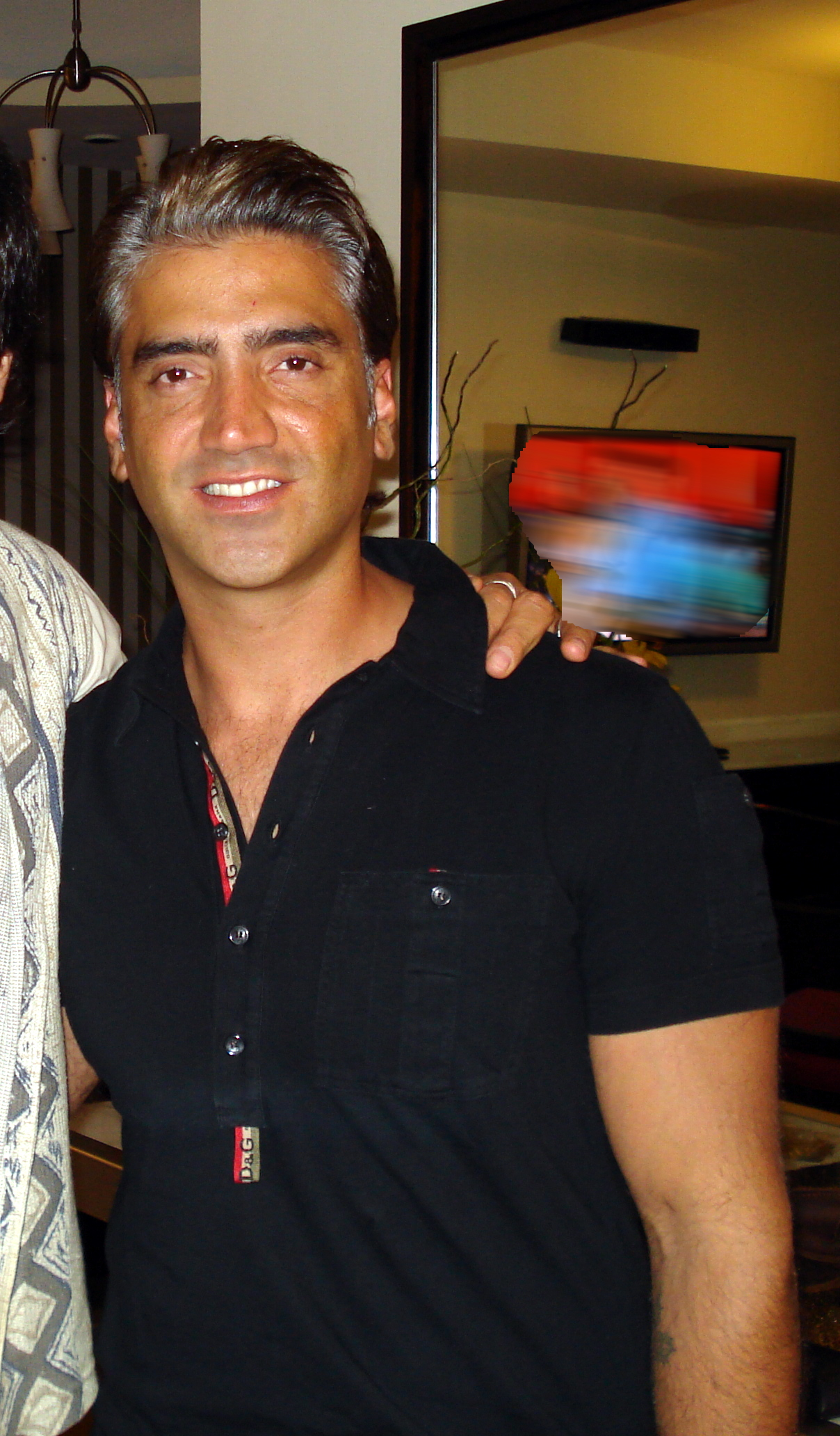
Alejandro Fernández is part of a notable family of Mariachi composers

Fernández studied to become an architect, but turned to singing in 1991 with the encouragement of his father. He is the youngest son of his family. He has two older brothers, Vicente, Jr., and Gerardo, and a sister, Alejandra. He and his brothers are known in Mexico as "Los tres potrillos" (The three colts).

In the late 1990s, Fernández's older brother Vicente Jr., was kidnapped by a band of organized crime. The kidnappers cut off two of his fingers and sent them to his father as a warning. After Vicente Fernández allegedly paid a large sum of money, Vicente, Jr., was released. The exact amount was never announced.

Fernández is co-owner of a shopping center in Guadalajara called "Unicenter", containing various businesses and employing around 170 people. He collaborated with his family in the construction of Arena VFG, with a capacity for 11,000 people. The arena hosts mainly musical performances and charreria competitions. Fernández is an expert in horse riding and charreria. He is a supporter of the Mexican football team Atlas, and is good friends with iconic footballer Rafael Márquez.

Fernández has five children: three (Alejandro, Jr. and the twin girls América and Camila) with his ex-wife América Guinart, and two (Emiliano and Valentina) with Colombian model Ximena Díaz. In the mid-2000s, he claimed to have undergone a vasectomy.

== Discography ==
=== Studio albums ===
- 1992: Alejandro Fernández
- 1993: Piel de Niña
- 1994: Grandes Éxitos a la Manera de Alejandro Fernández
- 1995: Que Seas Muy Feliz
- 1996: Muy Dentro de Mi Corazón
- 1997: Me Estoy Enamorando
- 1999: Mi Verdad
- 2000: Entre tus brazos
- 2001: Orígenes
- 2003: Niña Amada Mía
- 2004: A Corazón Abierto
- 2007: Viento a Favor
- 2009: Dos Mundos: Evolución
- 2009: Dos Mundos: Tradición
- 2013: Confidencias
- 2017: Rompiendo Fronteras
- 2020: Hecho en México
- 2024: Te Llevo en la Sangre

=== Live albums ===
- 1999: Christmas in Vienna VI
- 2002: Un Canto de México
- 2003: En Vivo: Juntos Por Ultima Vez
- 2005: México — Madrid: En Directo y Sin Escalas
- 2010: Dos Mundos: Revolución
- 2014: Confidencias Reales
- 2025: De Rey a Rey

== See also ==
- List of best-selling Latin music artists
- List of Mexicans
