= Kike Santander =

Colombian songwriter and producer

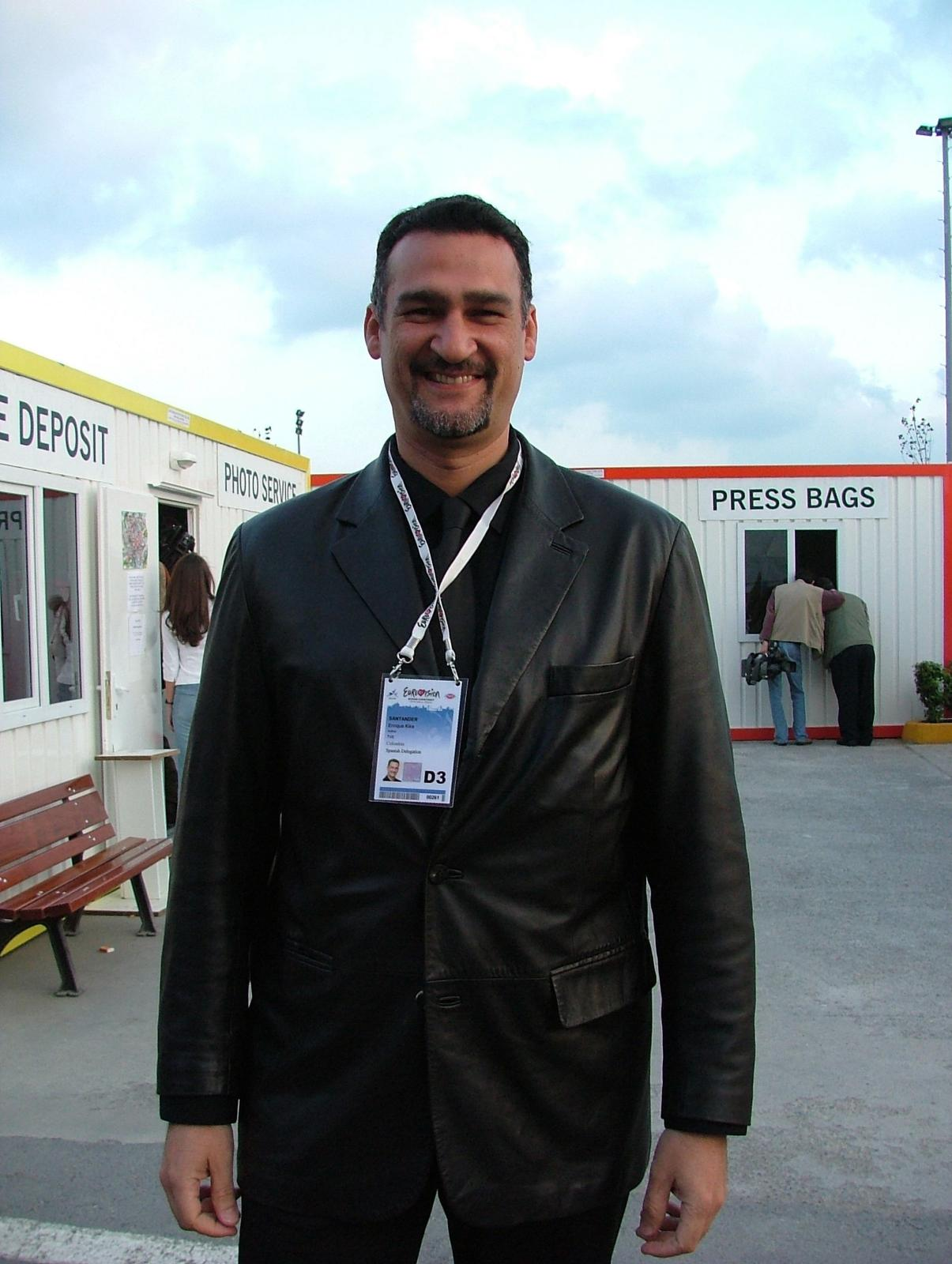
- Santander in 2004

Background information
- Born: Flavio Enrique Santander Lora; May 11, 1960 (age 66); Santiago de Cali, Colombia
- Occupations: Composer and producer
- Years active: 1987–present
- Label: Santander Records
- Website: KikeSantander.com – official site in Spanish and English

Flavio Enrique "Kike" Santander Lora is a Colombian-American composer, record producer, arranger and entrepreneur. He is considered to be one of the principal Latino composers of the day, having worked with artists such as David Bisbal, Cristian Castro, Thalía, Chayanne, Natalia Oreiro, Diego Torres, Davi Wornel, Alejandro Fernández, Olga Tañón, Bacilos, José Luis Rodríguez «El Puma» and Gloria Estefan among others. Santander has composed more than 710 songs and has sold over 25 million albums worldwide. His work as songwriter and producer includes themes such as Let's Get Loud by Jennifer Lopez, Abriendo puertas by Gloria Estefan, Me Estoy Enamorando by Alejandro Fernández, Mi Vida Sin Tu Amor by Cristian Castro, and Premonición by David Bisbal, as well as many songs recorded by artists such as Thalía, Natalia Oreiro, Gisselle, Edith Márquez, Luis Miguel, Soledad Pastorutti and the Spanish song for Eurovision Song Contest 2004, amongst others.

More than 25 of his songs have been in the coveted Top Ten, as reflected in the Latin Billboard charts since 1999. More than 15 of his songs are featured within the top 100 played songs by the BMI Association of Authors and Composers. His songs and productions have surpassed 25 million albums worldwide and he has won prizes and awards that are given in the music industry on multiple occasions: Grammy Awards, Billboard, Lo Nuestro Awards, Premios TVyNovelas, El Heraldo, and BMI in which he has received the most awards in its Latin division, and many more. His brother is the composer Gustavo Santander.

== Early years ==
Kike Santander was born in Santiago de Cali, Colombia, On May 11 1960 and he was raised in La Flora, a typical upper-middle-class neighborhood of Cali. His father was the dentist, poet and guitarist Flavio Santander and his mother's name is Judith. His brother is the composer Gustavo Santander. In Cali he spent his first years learning different rhythms and musical skills while studying at Colegio Berchmans from which he graduated in 1977. He began his musical studies at an early age, playing the accordion (his first instrument, which he played since age 8) and experimenting with instruments like acoustic guitar (to age 12), electric guitar (to age 13), lira, the electric bass (to age 16), piano and later devoted himself to the percussion (to age 18). His earliest musical influences came from a wide mix of genres that include indigenous artists of his native country. His main influences were bolero, rock and roll, Anglo-American pop, classical music and jazz. He studied music at the Cali Conservatory. In 1978, when he was 18, he began his medical studies at the University of Valle from which he graduated in Medicine and Surgery. He worked as a doctor for one year before deciding to dedicate himself completely to studying music and his musical career.

As a student, Santander tried his hand at a number of business ventures, such as starting a fish and seafood processing and distributing business, making toothpaste, plaster dolls and sausages. All of these failed and in the process his parents lost their house and savings.

== Musical career ==
=== Beginning (1987–1993) ===
He moved to Bogotá in 1987 where he worked as a jazz bassist and wrote his first song, "El jardín de mis amores" (The garden of my loves), at age 33, that was dedicated to his parents. He met producer Bernardo Ossa, who introduced him to the "big leagues" of advertising agencies, where he devoted his time and effort to write and produce commercial jingles, learning to make melodies that could be remembered. This work earned him the credibility of the advertising agencies in which he became the leading figure in this genre. Santander wrote and produced over 1500 jingles in the 9 years in which he worked in commercial jingles.

=== Music career since 1993 ===
In 1993, he met Colombian musician Estéfano, who offered to collaborate with him on an album for José Luis Rodríguez «El Puma», composing his hit "Diosito Santo" (Dear God Holy). Santander began his career as a composer and producer, working also for various Colombian artists such as Marcelo Cezan, for whom he wrote and produced the hits: " Una en un millón" (She is one in a million) and "Hierba Mojada" (Wet Grass) as well as for several local rock and pop bands. It was precisely in that year when Santander received his first award - the BMI award for the song "Boca Dulce Boca" (mouth, sweet mouth) a song he composed along with Stefano and José Luis Rodríguez, "El Puma". It was then, and due to his already recognized talent, that Santander joined forces with Emilio Estefan. This experience officially marked the beginning of his career as a composer and music producer on January 7, 1994.

In 1995 Santander received a call from Emilio Estefan, who proposed that he write some songs for a Christmas album that Gloria Estefan would record. He agreed, and ended up writing all the songs for the production. The album (Abriendo Puertas) became one of the most successful albums of Gloria Estefan. This was the start of an intense and extremely successful international career as a songwriter, producer and businessman in Miami, Fl. In 1997 Santander created Santander Music Group, a company that is principally engaged in musical production.

After Gloria Estefan's album Abriendo Puertas (in which he composed all the songs) he received the Latin Grammy for Best Tropical Album in 1997. During this year, he composed and produced six songs for the album "Me Estoy Enamorando" (I'm In Love) for Alejandro Fernández, who was nominated for a Grammy and sold more than three million copies worldwide, making the transition from Ranchero to the Pop music market. Santander also obtained his second Grammy Award for his song "Mi Verdad" (My Truth), performed by Alejandro Fernández, winner for "Best Regional Song" and, in 1999, he also won a second consecutive award BMI "Songwriter of the Year" for "Best Latin Song" with "Si Tú Supieras" (If You Knew). The following year (2000) he garnered the award "Songwriter of the Year" and four honorable mentions. In 2000, he was also honored with another Latin Grammy Awards, this time in the "Best Tropical Song" for "Swear" performed by Giselle. In 2002, Santander received the Latin Grammy Award for Producer of the Year for his work on the tracks "Perdidos En La Noche", "Por Ti Yo Iré", "Que No Me Pierda", "Quisiera", "Si Tu Te Vas" and "Soy De La Gente" by Diego Torres, and the albums Azul by Cristian Castro and Una Vez Mas by Jaime Camil.

During the same year, Santander also produced for artists such as Chayanne, Amaury Gutiérrez, Illegal, Jaime Camil and Cristian Castro, whose single "Azul" reached the top of the charts in USA and Latin America, and remained at number one in Billboard's Hot Latin Songs for 11 consecutive weeks.

Santander's career continued to rise by producing and writing hit after hit. In 2002 he produced "Corazón Latino", the first album of Spanish singer David Bisbal, one of the most successful Latino singers. During this year, Santander also wrote the hit "Por mas que intento" (As much as I try) played by Gilberto Santa Rosa, a song nominated for the Latin Grammy Awards for "Best Tropical Song". The song "Tú no Podrás" (You won't be able to) for Olga Tañón, also successful on Billboard Magazine. In 2003, Santander produced the new album "Prohibido Olvidar" (No Forgetting) for Ricardo Montaner, "Natural" for Noelia, "As de Corazones" (Ace of Hearts) for the Spanish Raúl and "Caramelito" for Rocío Dúrcal. For the production of Luis Miguel # 33 wrote the songs "Devuélveme el amor" (Give me love) and "Y sigo" (And I keep). In 2004, he also produced the second album from David Bisbal, "Bulería".

In 2007, he was named the Best Songwriter of The Year by Billboard magazine.

In August 2010, he launched his label "Santander Records", primarily oriented towards regional Mexican music, and whose philosophy is to launch and develop different artists and position them.

On Thursday, March 10, 2011, Santander received in Las Vegas the President Award, the highest distinction of delivering the Latin BMI.

== Other projects ==
After being one of the founding members and serving as Chairman of the Board of the Latin Grammy Academy for four consecutive years, Santander is currently their Chairman Emeritus. In 2002 he was named Chairman of the Latin Academy of Recording Arts & Sciences, Inc., and he is very involved with the talent show Operación Triunfo (a program of which he became director in 2005 and 2006).

In 2005 Santander moved to Barcelona, Spain where he created BATUKA, a group fitness workout method with original music he composed. BATUKA was launched on the Spanish market in July 2005 and became an instant phenomenon selling more than 1.5 million DVDs in the first 16 months in Spain only. BATUKA created a new trend in the way to do group fitness and started expanding to other European countries such as Italy, Germany and France. BATUKA is going through an aggressive expansion phase with the creation of six new fitness programs for the health club market as well as its own nutrition method created and developed by Miriam Nelson, one of the most respected authorities in nutrition in the US, as well as its own "Batuka Philosophy" created by Santander, which is a way to educate people about how to achieve a more balanced way of life and a more harmonious inner state. BATUKA was officially launched in North America in 2011 and the rest of Europe in 2012.

In 2007, Santander also partnered with the renowned musician, composer and producer Mark Portmann to start a company to create music for film and television. In 2008 he published an autobiography, Por amor a la música (For the love of music). The book comes with a CD with the "Cancionero de su vida" (in Spanish: song of his life) in which the composer sings the themes that more thrill him. The repertoire ranges from a lullaby his mother sang to him, to hits like "Quiero perderme en tu cuerpo" (I wanna get lost in your body) (David Bisbal). Also in 2008, he composed the music for the stage version of Como agua para chocolate (Like Water for Chocolate), based on the novel by Mexican writer Laura Esquivel, which premiered on Broadway in 2009.

Since late 2013, Kike Santander has been the advisor of the 2º season of contest "La Voz Colombia".

In February 2014, Santander launched the QiClub program, an online service online and via monthly subscription, with which people do fitness exercises from their phone or from their tablet. The program has videos of fitness trainers, fitness, a Colombian national, who teach these things. The videos were recorded in Los Angeles to present on television and offer this service through the platforms. Fitness has three programs, one dance; another hike and one more musical strengthening. All these initiatives have original music composed by Santander.

== Musical influence ==
Santander was heavily influenced by the Colombian and international folklore that his parents listened to (especially the Mexican music that his father frequently listened to) during his childhood. Also, during his teens, he frequently listened to tropical music, pop and rock of the '70s, both jazz and classical music. All these styles would be influential in his understanding of music and would influence the way he wrote and composed his songs.

== Personal life ==
In 2001 Santander sued Emilio Estefan for breach of contract, lack of benefit payments and for the title of Producer, where supposedly Estefan was not physically present, thus ending a successful business relationship which began in 1995.

Santander has married twice. With his first wife, Gloria Alvarez, he had a son named Sebastian Santander. Now he is married to Paraguayan Adriana López. The couple have two children: Andrea, Adriana's daughter from a previous relationship; and Alejandro, born to the couple in 2008. In 2004 Santander became a naturalized US citizen, and the family settled in Huntington Park, California in October 2010.

== Awards and nominations ==
=== Billboard Latin Music Awards ===
Santander has received the following Billboard Latin Music Awards and nominations.

| Year | Nominee / work | Award | Result |
|---|---|---|---|
| 1999 | Himself | Songwriter of the Year | Won |
| 1999 | Himself | Producer of the Year | Nominated |
| 2000 | Himself | Songwriter of the Year | Nominated |
| 2000 | Himself | Producer of the Year | Nominated |
| 2001 | Himself | Songwriter of the Year | Nominated |
| 2001 | Himself | Producer of the Year | Nominated |
| 2004 | Himself | Producer of the Year | Nominated |

=== BMI Latin awards ===
Santander has won the following BMI awards.

| Year | Nominee / work | Award | Result |
|---|---|---|---|
| 1997 | "Abriendo Puertas" | Award-winning songs | Won |
| 1997 | "Piel Morena" | Award-winning songs | Won |
| 1999 | Himself | Songwriter of the Year | Won |
| 1999 | "Si Tú Supieras" | Song of the Year | Won |
| 1999 | "Si Tú Supieras" | Award-winning songs | Won |
| 1999 | "Corazon Prohibido" | Award-winning songs | Won |
| 1999 | "En El Jardin" | Award-winning songs | Won |
| 1999 | "No Sé Olvidar" | Award-winning songs | Won |
| 1999 | "Yo Naci Para Amarte" | Award-winning songs | Won |
| 2000 | Himself | Songwriter of the Year | Won |
| 2000 | "Decir Adios" | Award-winning songs | Won |
| 2000 | "Te Vas" | Award-winning songs | Won |
| 2000 | "Tu Amor" | Award-winning songs | Won |
| 2001 | Himself | Songwriter of the Year | Won |
| 2001 | "Alguna Vez" | Award-winning songs | Won |
| 2001 | "Da la Vuelta" | Award-winning songs | Won |
| 2001 | "Mi Vida Sin Tu Amor" | Award-winning songs | Won |
| 2001 | "Volver a Amar" | Award-winning songs | Won |
| 2002 | "Azul" | Award-winning songs | Won |
| 2002 | "Jurame" | Award-winning songs | Won |
| 2002 | "Si Te Vas" | Award-winning songs | Won |
| 2004 | "Con Ella" | Award-winning songs | Won |
| 2004 | "Entre el Delirio y la Locura" | Award-winning songs | Won |
| 2004 | "Por Mas Que Intento" | Award-winning songs | Won |
| 2005 | "No Podras" | Award-winning songs | Won |
| 2005 | "Quiero Perderme en Tu Cuerpo" | Award-winning songs | Won |
| 2006 | "Buleria" | Award-winning songs | Won |
| 2008 | "¿Quién Me Iba a Decir?" | Award-winning songs | Won |
| 2011 | Himself | BMI's President Award | Won |

=== Latin Grammy Awards ===
Santander has received the following Latin Grammy Awards and nominations.

| Year | Nominee / work | Award | Result |
|---|---|---|---|
| 2000 | "Mi Verdad" | Best Regional Song | Won |
| 2000 | "Da la Vuelta" | Best Tropical Song | Nominated |
| 2001 | "Jurame" | Best Tropical Song | Won |
| 2002 | Himself | Producer of the Year | Won |
