= Mi Verdad (album) =

Studio album by Alejandro Fernández
- Released: 11 May 1999
- Recorded: 1999
- Genre: Mariachi
- Length: 41:34
- Label: Columbia
- Producer: Pedro Ramírez

Alejandro Fernández chronology
| Me Estoy Enamorando (1997) | Mi Verdad (1999) | Christmas in Vienna VI (1999) |

Singles from Mi Verdad
- 1. "Loco" Released: 1999; 2. "Si He Sabido Amar" Released: 1999

Professional ratings
Review scores
| Source | Rating |
|---|---|
| Allmusic | 3/5 stars |

Mi Verdad ("My truth") is the seventh album recorded by Mexican singer Alejandro Fernández. Produced by Pedro Ramírez, this album marks the return to the genre that opened the doors for his success. Videos were created for the songs "Loco" and "Nadie Simplemente Nadie". It received a nomination for a Grammy Award for Best Mexican/Mexican-American Album.

== Track listing ==
1. La Lluvia Sigue Cayendo (Manuel Monterrosas) - 3:54
2. Loco (Jorge Massias) - 3:16
3. Si He Sabido Amor (Humberto Estrada) - 3:53
4. Avísame (Manuel Monterrosas) - 2:59
5. Hoy Que Estás Ausente (Manuel Monterrosas) - 3:48
6. Mi Verdad (Kike Santander) - 2:12
7. Mentirosos (Homero Aguilar) - 3:18
8. Nadie Simplemente Nadie (Susana Fernández) - 3:44
9. A Una Señora (Manuel Monterrosas) - 2:55
10. ¿Por Qué? (Manuel Eduardo Castro) - 2:42
11. Esta Noche (Manuel Eduardo Castro) - 2:54
12. Amante Torero (Alejandro Dávila, Luis Ramos) - 3:28
13. Así Como Soy, Yo Soy (Manuel Monterrosas) - 2:31

== Chart performance ==
=== Album ===
| Chart (1999) | Peak position |
|---|---|
| Billboard 200 | 148 |
| Billboard Regional Mexican Albums | 2 |
| Billboard Top Latin Albums | 5 |
| Billboard Heatseekers | 5 |

=== Singles ===
| Year | Chart | Track | Peak |
|---|---|---|---|
| 1999 | Billboard Hot Latin Songs | "Loco" | 1 |
| 1999 | Billboard Latin Pop Airplay | "Loco" | 6 |
| 1999 | Billboard Latin Regional Mexican Airplay | "Loco" | 2 |
| 1999 | Billboard Latin Pop Airplay | "Si He Sabido Amor" | 15 |
| 1999 | Billboard Hot Latin Songs | "Si He Sabido Amor" | 9 |
| 1999 | Billboard Latin Regional Mexican Airplay | "Si He Sabido Amor" | 5 |

== Sales and certifications ==
| Region | Certification | Certified units/sales |
|---|---|---|
| Mexico (AMPROFON) | 3× Platinum | 450,000^{^} |
| United States (RIAA) | 2× Platinum (Latin) | 200,000^{^} |
^{^} Shipments figures based on certification alone.
