= Alejandro Fernández (album) =

Studio album by Alejandro Fernández
- Released: December 1992
- Recorded: 1992
- Genre: Mariachi
- Length: 37:38
- Label: Columbia
- Producer: Pedro Ramírez

Alejandro Fernández chronology
Alejandro Fernández (1992)	Piel de Niña (1993)

Singles from Alejandro Fernandez
- 1. "Brumas" Released: 1992; 2. "Necesito Olvidarla" Released: 1992

Professional ratings
Review scores
Source	Rating
Allmusic	2/5 stars

Alejandro Fernández (stylized in all caps) is the self-titled debut studio album by Mexican singer Alejandro Fernández. Produced by Pedro Ramírez. The hit singles from this album are: "Necesito Olvidarla", "Equivocadamente" and "Brumas" (for the latter Alejandro Fernández shot a music video). It was nominated for Regional Mexican Album of the Year at the 5th Lo Nuestro Awards.

== Track listing ==
1. "Todo Termino" (Rubén Rada) – 2:54
2. "Equivocadamente" (Fernando Z. Maldonado) – 2:49
3. "Se Me Van Las Ganas" (Indalecio Ramírez) – 3:30
4. "Invierno" (Capitán Chinaco) – 4:05
5. "Otra Vida" (Manuel Eduardo Castro) – 2:53
6. "Intenta Vivir Sin Mi" (Manuel Monterrosas) – 2:54
7. "Necesito Olvidarla" (Manuel Eduardo Castro) – 2:59
8. "Brumas" (Jorge Villamil) – 3:20
9. "Cuando Yo Queria Ser Grande" (Manuel Monterrosas) – 3:43
10. "En Cualquier Idioma" (Antonio Valdez Herrera) – 2:31
11. "Te Quedas O Te Vas" (Manuel Monterrosas) – 2:39
12. "Que Pregunta Muchacho" (Dúo con Vicente Fernández) (Indalecio Ramírez) – 3:22

== Chart performance ==
=== Album ===
Chart (1992)	Peak position
US Regional Mexican Albums (Billboard)	2

=== Singles ===
Year	Chart	Track	Peak
1992	Billboard Hot Latin Songs	Necesito Olvidarla	19
1992	Billboard Hot Latin Songs	Brumas	11
