= Muy Dentro de Mi Corazón =

Studio album by Alejandro Fernández
- Released: December 10, 1996
- Recorded: 1996
- Genre: Mariachi
- Length: 40:06
- Label: Sony Discos
- Producer: Pedro Ramírez

Alejandro Fernández chronology
Que Seas Muy Feliz (1995)	Muy Dentro de Mi Corazón (1996)	Me Estoy Enamorando (1997)

Singles from Muy Dentro de Mi Corazón
- 1. "Moño Negro" Released: 1996; 2. "Abrazame" Released: 1997; 3. "Es la Mujer" Released: 1997; 4. "Nube Viajera" Released: 1997

Professional ratings
Review scores
Source	Rating
Allmusic	4/5 stars

Muy Dentro de Mi Corazón ("Very deep in my heart") is the fifth album recorded by Mexican singer Alejandro Fernández. Produced by Pedro Ramírez. He shoot videos for the songs "Nube Viajera" and "Abrazame". Other songs known from this album are "Moño Negro" and "Es La Mujer". It received a nomination for a Grammy Award for Best Mexican/Mexican-American Album and Regional Mexican Album of the Year at the Lo Nuestro Awards of 1998.

== Track listing ==
1. "Dentro De Mi Corazon" (Armando Manzanero) – 3:17
2. "Como Puede Ser" (Armando Manzanero) – 3:46
3. "Nube Viajera" (Jorge Massias) – 4:04
4. "Que Digan Misa" (Manuel Eduardo Castro) – 2:26
5. "Es La Mujer" (Alberto Chávez) – 2:58
6. "Ya Se Que Dices" (Manuel Monterrosas) – 3:18
7. "Moño Negro" (Manuel Monterrosas) – 2:24
8. "Abrazame" (Rafael Ferro García, Julio Iglesias) – 3:18
9. "Me Llevaras En Ti" (Jorge Villamil) – 3:43
10. "Es Cosa De Hombres" (José Guadalupe Esparza) – 3:02
11. "Chatita Querida" (Joan Sebastian) – 2:15
12. "Popurri Caribeño" ("La Paloma"/"Cuando Salí de Cuba"/"He Perdido Una Perla") (Iradier Montes Gil, Luis Aguilé, Nazario López) – 5:35

== Chart performance ==
=== Album ===
Chart (1997)	Peak position
US Regional Mexican Albums (Billboard)	5
US Top Latin Albums (Billboard)	13

=== Singles ===
Year	Chart	Track	Peak
1996	Billboard Hot Latin Songs	Moño Negro	16
1997	Billboard Latin Regional Mexican Airplay	Moño Negro	12
1997	Billboard Hot Latin Songs	Nube Viajera	9
1997	Billboard Latin Regional Mexican Airplay	Nube Viajera	7
1997	Billboard Hot Latin Songs	Es La Mujer	7
1997	Billboard Latin Regional Mexican Airplay	Es La Mujer	4
1997	Billboard Latin Pop Airplay	Nube Viajera	16
1997	Billboard Hot Latin Songs	Abrazame	31
1997	Billboard Latin Pop Airplay	Abrazame	16

== Sales and certifications ==
Region	Certification	Certified units/sales
United States (RIAA)	2× Platinum (Latin)	200,000^{^}
^{^} Shipments figures based on certification alone.
