= Que Seas Muy Feliz =

Studio album by Alejandro Fernández
- Released: 2 May 1995
- Recorded: 1995
- Genre: Mariachi
- Length: 35:59
- Label: Columbia
- Producer: Pedro Ramírez

Alejandro Fernández chronology
Grandes Éxitos a la Manera de Alejandro Fernández (1994)	Que Seas Muy Feliz (1995)	Muy Dentro de Mi Corazón (1996)

Singles from Que Seas Muy Feliz
- 1. "Como Quien Pierde Una Estrella" Released: 1995; 2. "Que Seas Muy Feliz" Released: 1995; 3. "Paso del Norte" Released: 1996; 4. "Que Bueno" Released: 1997

Professional ratings
Review scores
Source	Rating
Allmusic	4.5/5 stars

Que Seas Muy Feliz ("May you be very happy") is the fourth album recorded by the Mexican singer Alejandro Fernández. It was produced by Pedro Ramírez. The song "Como Quien Pierde Una Estrella" was the most popular song of its time, with radio stations playing it with an unusual frequency, turning it into a new anthem for the genre. Videos were made for the songs "Como Quien Pierde Una Estrella" and "La Mitad Que Me Faltaba".

== Track listing ==
1. "Que Bueno" (Manuel Eduardo Castro) – 3:10
2. "Que Será De Mí" (Marcela Galván) – 2:44
3. "Llorando Penas" (Manuel Monterrosas) – 3:09
4. "Como Quien Pierde Una Estrella" (Humberto Estrada) – 3:32
5. "Ojo Por Ojo" (Pepe Y. Jr.) – 2:26
6. "Paso Del Norte" (Felipe Valdés Leal) – 3:04
7. "Uno Más" (Jesús Navarrete) – 2:22
8. "Y Después" (Indalecio Ramírez) – 2:56
9. "Me Recordarás Llorando" (Pedro Villar) – 2:58
10. "La Mitad Que Me Faltaba" (Manuel Monterrosas) – 3:24
11. "Que Seas Muy Feliz" (Manuel Monterrosas) – 2:45
12. "El Potrillo" (Crescencio Hernández) – 3:29

== Chart performance ==
=== Album ===
Chart (1995-1996)	Peak position
US Billboard Top Latin Albums	28
US Billboard Regional Mexican Albums	12

=== Singles ===
Year	Chart	Track	Peak
1995	Billboard Hot Latin Songs	Que Seas Muy Feliz	17
1995	Billboard Hot Latin Songs	Como Quien Pierde Una Estrella	17
1995	Billboard Latin Regional Mexican Airplay	Como Quien Pierde Una Estrella	11
1996	Billboard Hot Latin Songs	Paso Del Norte	29
1997	Billboard Latin Pop Airplay	Como Quien Pierde Una Estrella	18
1997	Billboard Hot Latin Songs	Que Bueno	33
1997	Billboard Latin Pop Airplay	Que Bueno	19

== Sales and certifications ==
Region	Certification	Certified units/sales
United States (RIAA)	Gold	500,000^{^}
^{^} Shipments figures based on certification alone.
