= Grandes Éxitos a la Manera de Alejandro Fernández =

Studio album by Alejandro Fernández
- Released: May 31, 1994
- Genre: Mariachi
- Length: 48:54
- Label: Columbia
- Producer: Pedro Ramírez

Alejandro Fernández chronology
Piel de Niña (1993)	Grandes Éxitos a la Manera de Alejandro Fernández (1994)	Que Seas Muy Feliz (1995)

Professional ratings
Review scores
Source	Rating
AllMusic	4.5/5 stars

Grandes Éxitos a la Manera de Alejandro Fernández (English: Greatest Hits in the Way of Alejandro Fernández) is the third album recorded by Mexican singer Alejandro Fernández and was produced by Pedro Ramírez. In this album, Fernández interprets classic songs of great composers like Luis Demetrio and Armando Manzanero. He shot a video for the song "A Pesar De Todo". Other songs known from this album is "Si Dios Me Quita La Vida". Despite the title, this is not a greatest hits compilation (it can be considered more of a tribute/covers album).

== Track listing ==
1. "La Gloria Eres Tú" (José Antonio Méndez) – 2:57
2. "Consentida" (Alfredo Núñez de Borbón) – 4:01
3. "Encadenados" (Carlos Arturo Briz) – 2:54
4. "Si Dios Me Quita La Vida" (Luis Demetrio) – 4:33
5. "Conozco A Los Dos" (Pablo Valdés Hernández) – 3:03
6. "Rival" (Agustín Lara) – 3:42
7. "No" (Armando Manzanero) – 3:15
8. "A Pesar De Todo" (Augusto Algueró, Antonio Guijarro) – 3:19
9. "Noche De Ronda" (Agustín Lara) – 4:01
10. "La Enramada" (Graciela Olmos) – 2:55
11. "El Día Que Me Quieras" (Carlos Gardel, Alfredo Le Pera) – 4:18
12. "Piensa En Mí" (Agustín Lara) – 4:25
13. "Mitad Tú, Mitad Yo" (Antonio Cisneros, Mario Molina Montes) – 2:44
14. "Voy" (Luis Demetrio) – 2:47

== Chart performance ==
=== Album ===
Chart (1994)	Peak position
US Regional Mexican Albums (Billboard)	12
US Top Latin Albums (Billboard)	30

=== Singles ===
Year	Chart	Track	Peak
1994	Billboard Hot Latin Songs	Si Dios Me Quita La Vida	19
1994	Billboard Hot Latin Songs	A Pesar De Todo	10
1994	Billboard Latin Regional Mexican Airplay	A Pesar De Todo	10

== Sales ==
Region	Certification	Certified units/sales
Mexico	—	100,000
