= Piel de Niña =

Studio album by Alejandro Fernández
- Released: April 1993
- Recorded: 1993
- Genre: Mariachi
- Length: 36:06
- Label: Sony Music
- Producer: Pedro Ramírez

Alejandro Fernández chronology
Alejandro Fernández (1992)	Piel de Niña (1993)	Grandes Éxitos a la Manera de Alejandro Fernández (1994)

Singles from Piel de Niña
- 1. "Acabé Por Llorar" Released: 1993; 2. "Cascos Ligeros" Released: 1993

Professional ratings
Review scores
Source	Rating
Allmusic	4/5 stars

Piel de Niña (Girl's Skin) is the second album recorded by Mexican singer Alejandro Fernández, this is an album with a romantic cut produced by Pedro Ramírez. He made a video for the song "Piel De Niña". Other songs known from this album are "Cascos Ligeros", "Acabe Por Llorar" and "A La Vera Del Camino".

== Track listing ==
1. "Piel De Niña" (Jesús Gluck, Honorio Herrero) – 2:41
2. "No Estoy Triste" (Armando Manzanero) – 2:55
3. "Acabe Por Llorar" (Antonio Valdez Herrera) – 2:50
4. "Cenizas" (D.A.R.) – 3:49
5. "A La Vera Del Camino" (Jorge Villamil) – 3:42
6. "Cascos Ligeros" (Manuel Eduardo Castro) – 2:06
7. "Hasta Dondes Estes" (Jorge Massias) – 3:19
8. "Mentira, Mentira" (Saulo Sedano) – 2:55
9. "Cuando Te Olvide" (Manuel Eduardo Castro) – 2:20
10. "Quisiera Olvidarme De Ti" (Rigoberto Alfaro, Jesús Rodríguez De Hujar) – 3:03
11. "Contigo Aprendi" (Armando Manzanero) – 3:25
12. "Si No Eres Tu" (Baldomero Carballo Salas) – 3:01

== Chart performance ==
=== Album ===
Chart (1993)	Peak position
US Regional Mexican Albums (Billboard)	5

=== Singles ===
Year	Chart	Track	Peak
1993	Billboard Hot Latin Songs	Piel De Niña	23
1993	Billboard Hot Latin Songs	Cascos Ligeros	11
1993	Billboard Hot Latin Songs	Acabe Por Llorar	24
