= Top 100 Mexico =

Mexican record chart

Top 100 México was a record chart which accounted for sixty percent of the albums sold in Mexico. The chart had the support of major record distributors in Mexico and was issued by the Asociación Mexicana de Productores de Fonogramas y Videogramas (AMPROFON; English: Mexican Association of Producers of Phonograms and Videograms, A.C.) on a weekly basis from 2005 until July 9, 2020, when the chart was discontinued. The Top 100 México contained over 100 titles sold in the country, with separate charts that include 20 albums for popular music genres, such as norteño, banda and ranchera, Spanish, and English language albums.

In 2005, the best-selling album in Mexico was the soundtrack for the TV series Rebelde, recorded by the lead cast members, who eventually formed the band RBD; in the United States the album sold 416,000 copies and was named the Pop Album of the Year at the Billboard Latin Music Awards. La Voz de un Ángel by Yuridia was the number-one selling album of 2006 (also ranked at number 5 in 2005 and 52 in 2007), and the album eventually received a diamond certification in the country, the first since 1996 when performer Luis Miguel achieved that feat. Papito by Spanish performer Miguel Bosé was the best-selling album of 2007, received the Oye! Award for Album of the Year and earned four Latin Grammy Award nominations.

Para Siempre, the 79th studio album released by Vicente Fernández was the number-one album of 2008 in Mexico and the best-selling Regional-Mexican album of the decade 2000-2009 in the United States. Mexican band Camila earned a gold certification in Mexico the day of the release of their second studio album Dejarte de Amar, which ended 2010 as the best-selling recording in the country. From May 2013, some positions of the chart were published in the official Twitter account of AMPROFON, including the number one position.

== Number-one albums by year ==
- 2005
- 2006
- 2007
- 2008
- 2009
- 2010
- 2011
- 2012
- 2013
- 2014
- 2015
- 2016
- 2017
- 2018
- 2019
- 2020

== Best-selling albums by year ==
Best-selling albums in Mexico (2005)
1. Rebelde – RBD
2. Fijación Oral Vol. 1 – Shakira
3. México en la Piel – Luis Miguel
4. X – Intocable
5. La Voz de un Ángel – Yuridia
6. Mi Sangre – Juanes
7. A Corazón Abierto – Alejandro Fernández
8. Greatest Hits – Robbie Williams
9. En la Luna – Reyli
10. Un Viaje – Café Tacvba
Best-selling albums in Mexico (2006)
1. La Voz de un Ángel – Yuridia
2. Monkey Business – The Black Eyed Peas
3. Amar es Combatir – Maná
4. Navidades – Luis Miguel
5. Oral Fixation Vol. 2 – Shakira
6. Indeleble – Alejandra Guzmán
7. Il Divo – Il Divo
8. High School Musical – Various artists
9. Dulce Beat – Belanova
10. Allison – Allison
Best-selling albums in Mexico (2007)
1. Papito – Miguel Bosé
2. Todo Cambió – Camila
3. Viento a Favor – Alejandro Fernández
4. Vencedor – Valentín Elizalde
5. T25 – Timbiriche
6. Erase Una Vez – Lola
7. The Confessions Tour – Madonna
8. Lobo Domesticado – Valentín Elizalde
9. Quién Dijo Ayer – Ricardo Arjona
10. El Mundo se Equivoca – La 5ª Estación
Best-selling albums in Mexico (2008)
1. Para Siempre – Vicente Fernández
2. Cómplices – Luis Miguel
3. De Noche: Clásicos a Mi Manera – Alejandro Fernández
4. 15 Años de Exitos – Alejandro Fernández
5. Retro En Vivo – Emmanuel
6. Hard Candy – Madonna
7. MTV Unplugged – Julieta Venegas
8. Te Quiero: Romantic Style In Da World – Nigga
9. Arde el Cielo – Maná
10. Jonas Brothers – The Jonas Brothers
Best-selling albums in Mexico (2009)
1. Atrevete a Soñar – Various artists
2. Primera Fila – Vicente Fernández
3. Dos Mundos: Evolución – Alejandro Fernández
4. Dos Mundos: Tradición – Alejandro Fernández
5. La Revolución – Wisin & Yandel
6. De Noche: Clásicos a Mi Manera – Alejandro Fernández
7. Amante de lo Ajeno – María José
8. Thriller 25 – Michael Jackson
9. La Mente Maestra – DJ Nesty & Wisin & Yandel
10. The Fame – Lady Gaga
Best-selling albums in Mexico (2010)
1. Dejarte de Amar – Camila
2. Primera Fila – Thalía
3. My Worlds – Justin Bieber
4. Amar y Querer: Homenaje a las Grandes Canciones – Kalimba
5. The Fame – Lady Gaga
6. Desde la Cantina – Pesado
7. Desde la Cantina, Vol. 2 – Pesado
8. No Hay Imposibles – Chayanne
9. Luis Miguel – Luis Miguel
10. Euphoria – Enrique Iglesias
Best-selling albums in Mexico (2011)
1. MTV Unplugged: Los Tigres del Norte and Friends – Los Tigres del Norte
2. MTV Unplugged/Música de Fondo – Zoé
3. Viva el príncipe – Cristian Castro
4. Dejarte de Amar – Camila
5. 21 – Adele
6. Primera Fila – Thalía
7. Bien Acompañado – Reyli
8. Para Mi – Yuridia
9. En Primera Fila – Franco De Vita
10. 20 Años de Éxitos En Vivo con Moderatto – Alejandra Guzmán
Best-selling albums in Mexico (2012)
1. Up All Night – One Direction
2. 21 – Adele
3. Joyas Prestadas: Pop – Jenni Rivera
4. Take Me Home – One Direction
5. Para Mi – Yuridia
6. ¿Con Quién Se Queda El Perro? – Jesse & Joy
7. Live at the Royal Albert Hall – Adele
8. Papitwo – Miguel Bosé
9. Un Hombre Normal – Espinoza Paz
10. Irreversible...2012 – La Arrolladora Banda El Limón
Best-selling albums in Mexico (2013)
1. Confidencias – Alejandro Fernández
2. Midnight Memories – One Direction
3. Primera Fila: Sasha Benny Erik – Sasha, Benny y Erik
4. Take Me Home – One Direction
5. Habítame Siempre – Thalía
6. Random Access Memories – Daft Punk
7. Unorthodox Jukebox – Bruno Mars
8. Believe – Justin Bieber
9. Cómo Te Voy a Olvidar – Los Ángeles Azules
10. Joyas Prestadas: Pop – Jenni Rivera
Best-selling albums in Mexico (2014)
1. Cómo Te Voy a Olvidar – Los Ángeles Azules
2. Mis 40 en Bellas Artes – Juan Gabriel
3. Four – One Direction
4. Confidencias Reales – Alejandro Fernández
5. Sex and Love – Enrique Iglesias
6. La Guzmán: Primera Fila – Alejandra Guzmán
7. Primera Fila Flans – Ilse, Ivonne & Mimi
8. Formula, Vol. 2 – Romeo Santos
9. Unorthodox Jukebox – Bruno Mars
10. Soy lo que Quiero... Indispensable – Julión Álvarez
Best-selling albums in Mexico (2015)
1. Los Dúo – Juan Gabriel
2. Cómo Te Voy a Olvidar – Los Ángeles Azules
3. Made in the A.M. – One Direction
4. Confidencias Reales – Alejandro Fernández
5. Los Dúo, Vol. 2 – Juan Gabriel
6. Hasta la Raíz – Natalia Lafourcade
7. Purpose – Justin Bieber
8. Primera Fila - Hecho Realidad – Ha*Ash
9. En Vivo – OV7 - Kabah
10. Grandes Éxitos De Las Sonoras Con La Más Grande – Sonora Santanera
Best-selling albums in Mexico (2016)
1. Vive – José María Napoleón
2. 60 Aniversario – La Sonora Santanera
3. Los Dúo, Vol. 2 – Juan Gabriel
4. Hardwired... to Self-Destruct – Metallica
5. Los Dúo – Juan Gabriel
6. De Plaza en Plaza Cumbia Sinfónica – Los Ángeles Azules
7. Vestido de Etiqueta por Eduardo Magallanes – Juan Gabriel
8. Un Azteca En El Azteca – Vicente Fernández
9. Mis 40 en Bellas Artes – Juan Gabriel
10. Evolution – CD9
Best-selling albums in Mexico (2017)
1. Hardwired... to Self-Destruct – Metallica
2. ¡México Por Siempre! - Luis Miguel
3. 90's Pop Tour - Various Artists
4. Primera Fila - Bronco
5. La Trenza - Mon Laferte
6. Harry Styles - Harry Styles
7. Tributo A Los Baby's - Los Baby's
8. Juntos Por La Sonora - Sonora Dinamita
9. Sinfónico desde el Palacio de Bellas Artes - Mijares
10. De Plaza En Plaza Cumbia Sinfínica - Los Ángeles Azules
Best-selling albums in Mexico (2018)
1. Celebrando a una leyenda – Leo Dan
2. ¡México Por Siempre! - Luis Miguel
3. Esto si es cumbia - Los Ángeles Azules
4. Guerra - Carlos Rivera
5. Juntos - Timbiriche
6. Sobre el amor y sus efectos secundarios - Morat
7. Grandes Éxitos - Luis Miguel
8. Bolero de Oro de la Música Tropical - Carlos Cuevas
9. '90's Pop Tour Vol 2 - Various Artists
10. Bohemian Rhapsody - Queen
Best-selling albums in Mexico (2019)
1. Bohemian Rhapsody - Queen
2. '90's Pop Tour 3 - Various Artists
3. Esto si es cumbia - Los Ángeles Azules
4. México de mi corazón - Natalia Jiménez
5. Thank U, Next - Ariana Grande
6. Conexión - María José
7. Más Pandora Que Nunca - Pandora
8. Celebrando a una leyenda – Leo Dan
9. Greatest Hits - Queen
10. Lover - Taylor Swift

== See also ==
- List of best-selling albums in Mexico
