= Yuridia discography =

- Studio albums: 8
- Live albums: 1
- Compilation albums: 3
- Singles: 45
- Music videos: 35

Discography of Mexican singer Yuridia.

== Studio albums ==
Year	Album details	Peak chart positions				Certified Sales	Certifications (sales thresholds)
Year	Album details	MEX	US Latin Pop	US Top Latin	US Top Heat	Certified Sales	Certifications (sales thresholds)
2005	La Voz de un Ángel: Released: August 25, 2005 (MEX) December 13, 2005 (USA); Label: Sony Music Latin; Formats: CD, DVD, CD + DVD, digital download, LP	1	8	16	1	MEX: 1,450,000; US: 60,000	AMPROFON: 2× Diamond+4× Platinum+Gold; RIAA: Platinum (Latin)
2006	Habla El Corazón: Released: October 30, 2006 (MEX) December 5, 2006 (USA); Label: Sony Music Latin; Formats: CD, digital download	1	5	14	1	MEX: 300,000; US: 60,000	AMPROFON: 3× Platinum; RIAA: Platinum (Latin)
2007	Entre Mariposas: Released: November 15, 2007 (MEX) December 4, 2007 (USA); Label: Sony Music Latin; Formats: CD, digital download	1	7	13	1	MEX: 150,000	AMPROFON: Platinum+Gold
2009	Nada es Color de Rosa: Released: September 30, 2009 (MEX) October 13, 2009 (USA); Label: Sony Music Latin; Formats: CD, digital download	1	4	14	26	MEX: 90,000	AMPROFON: Platinum+Gold
2011	Para Mi: Released: December 6, 2011 (MEX) January 31, 2012 (USA); Label: Sony Music Latin; Formats: CD, digital download	1	5	15	27	MEX: 390,000	AMPROFON: Diamond+Platinum+Gold
2015	6: Released: October 9, 2015 (MEX); Label: Sony Music Latin; Formats: CD, CD + DVD, digital download	1	3	7		MEX: 180,000	AMPROFON: 3× Platinum
2022	Pa' Luego Es Tarde: Released: October 20, 2022; Label: Sony Music Latin; Formats: CD + DVD, digital download, LP	1	-	10	-	MEX: 350,000; US: 240,000	AMPROFON: 2× Platinum+Gold; RIAA: 4× Platinum (Latin)
2025	Sin Llorar: Released: February 6, 2025; Label: Sony Music Latin; Formats: CD +digital download						

== Live albums ==
Year	Album	MEX	US Top Latin	Certified Sales	Certifications (sales thresholds)
2017	Primera Fila	2	12	MEX: 180,000	AMPROFON: 3× Platinum

== Compilation albums ==
Year	Album	MEX	US Top Latin	Certified Sales	Certifications (sales thresholds)
2008	Yuridia Remixes	59	13	-	-
2012	Lo Esencial de Yuridia	9	-	MEX: 30,000	AMPROFON: Gold
2014	Personalidad: Yuridia	-	-	-	-

== Singles ==
Year	Single	Certified Sales	Certifications (sales thresholds)	Album
2005	Ángel	MEX: 100,000	AMPROFON: 2× Gold	La Voz de un Ángel
2006	Maldita primavera			La Voz de un Ángel
2006	Amiga (Yahir feat. Yuridia)			No te apartes de mí (Edición amigos)
2006	Como yo nadie te ha amado	MEX: 50,000	AMPROFON: Gold	Habla el Corazón
2007	Habla el corazón			Habla el Corazón
2007	Eclipse Total del Amor (feat. Patricio Borghetti)			Habla el Corazón
2007	Ahora entendí			Entre Mariposas
2008	Yo por él			Entre Mariposas
2008	En su lugar			Entre Mariposas
2009	Irremediable	MEX: 40,000	AMPROFON: Gold	Nada es color de rosa
2010	Me olvidarás			Nada es color de rosa
2010	Contigo			Nada es color de rosa
2010	No me preguntes más			Nada es color de rosa
2011	Quizás (Toby Love feat. Yuridia)			La voz de la juventud
2011	Ya te olvidé	MEX: 120,000	AMPROFON: 2× Platinum	Para Mí
2012	¿Qué nos pasó? (Reyli Barba feat. Yuridia)	MEX: 30,000	AMPROFON: Gold	Bien acompañado
2012	Lo que son las cosas			Para Mí
2013	Con el alma en pie (Yahir feat. Yuridia)			Zona Preferente
2015	Ya es muy tarde	MEX: 300,000	AMPROFON: Diamond	6
2015	Te Equivocaste	MEX: 330,000	AMPROFON: Diamond+Gold	6
2015	Cobarde	MEX: 330,000	AMPROFON: Diamond+Gold	6
2017	Amigos no por favor	MEX: 630,000	AMPROFON: 2× Diamond + Gold	Primera Fila
2018	Respóndeme tú (feat. Pepe Aguilar)	MEX: 150,000	AMPROFON: 2× Platinum+Gold	Primera Fila
2018	La Duda	MEX: 120,000	AMPROFON: 2× Platinum	Primera Fila
2019	No le llames amor	MEX: 120,000	AMPROFON: 2× Platinum	Non-album single
2019	Yo te prefiero a ti (Río Roma feat. Yuridia)	MEX: 270,000	AMPROFON: 4× Platinum+Gold	Rojo
2019	Yo te prefiero a ti (Banda Version) [Río Roma feat. Yuridia & La Addictiva]			Rojo
2020	Él lo tiene todo	MEX: 240,000	AMPROFON: 4× Platinum	Non-album single
2020	Cuando es amor			Non-album single
2021	Como tú (Chucho Rivas feat. Yuridia)			Non-album single
2022	¿Y tú, qué ganas?	MEX: 70,000	AMPROFON: Gold	Pa' luego es tarde
2022	¿Con qué se pega un corazón?	MEX: 280,000	AMPROFON: 2× Platinum	Pa' luego es tarde
2022	Me hace tanto bien (feat. Edén Muñoz)	MEX: 350,000	AMPROFON: 2× Platinum+Gold	Pa' luego es tarde
2022	¿Y qué tal si funciona? (feat. Banda MS de Sergio Lizárraga)	MEX: 560,000	AMPROFON: 4× Platinum	Pa' luego es tarde
2022	Que agonía (feat. Angela Aguilar)	MEX: 1,540,000; US: 1,560,000	AMPROFON: 2× Diamond+Platinum; RIAA: 26× Platinum (Latin)	Pa' luego es tarde
2023	«Qué agonía (Remix)» (Yahritza y Su Esencia feat. Yuridia & Ángela Aguilar)			Non-album single
2023	«Malamente»	MEX: 70,000	AMPROFON: Gold	Sin Llorar
2023	«Llévate» (feat. Los Dos Carnales)	MEX: 70,000	AMPROFON: Gold	Sin Llorar
2023	«Sin llorar»	MEX: 210,000	AMPROFON: Platinum+Gold	Sin Llorar
2024	«Mi eterno amor secreto (feat. Edén Muñoz)»	MEX: 70,000	AMPROFON: Gold	Sin Llorar
2024	«Felicítalo (feat. Los Ángeles Azules)»	MEX: 70,000	AMPROFON: Gold	Sin Llorar
2024	«Pensando positivo (Joss Favela feat. Yuridia)»			Mis Compas, Vol. 1
2024	«Literal»			Sin Llorar
2024	«Para que seas feliz»			Sin Llorar
2025	«Un bendito día (feat. Alejandro Fernández)»			Sin Llorar

== Other certified songs ==
Year	Single	Certified Sales	Certifications (sales thresholds)	Album
2022	Empieza a preocuparte	MEX: 70,000	AMPROFON: Gold	Pa' Luego Es Tarde
2022	Si no piensas cambiar	MEX: 70,000	AMPROFON: Gold	Pa' Luego Es Tarde
2022	Te dejo	MEX: 70,000	AMPROFON: Gold	Pa' Luego Es Tarde

== Music videos ==
Year	Song
2005	"Ángel" (La Academia 4)
2005	"Maldita Primavera" (La Academia 4)
2007	"Ahora entendi"
2009	"Irremediable"
2009	"Me Olvidaras"
2011	"Ya te olvidé"
2012	"Lo que son las cosas"
2013	"Con el alma en pie" (Yahir feat. Yuridia)
2015	"Ya es muy tarde"
2015	"Te equivocaste"
2016	"Cobarde"
2017	"Amigos No Por Favor (Primera Fila)"
2017	"Respóndeme Tú (Primera Fila) [feat. Pepe Aguilar]"
2017	"La Duda (Primera Fila)"
2019	"No le llames amor"
2019	"Yo te prefiero a ti" (Río Roma feat. Yuridia)
2019	"Yo te prefiero a ti" (Banda Version) [Río Roma feat. Yuridia & La Addictiva)
2020	"Él lo tiene todo"
2020	"Cuando es amor"
2021	"Como tú" (Chucho Rivas feat. Yuridia)
2022	"¿Y tú qué ganas?"
2022	"¿Con qué se pega un corazón?"
2022	"Me hace tanto bien" (feat. Edén Muñoz)
2022	"¿Y qué tal si funciona?" (feat. Banda MS de Sergio Lizárraga)
2022	"Que agonía" (feat. Angela Aguilar)
2023	«Malamente»
2023	«Llévate» (feat. Los Dos Carnales)
2023	«Sin llorar»
2024	«Mi eterno amor secreto (feat. Edén Muñoz)»
2024	«Felicítalo (feat. Los Ángeles Azules)»
2024	«Pensando positivo (Joss Favela feat. Yuridia)»
2024	«Literal»
2024	«Para que seas feliz»
2025	«Un bendito día (feat. Alejandro Fernández)»
