= List of number-one albums of 2006 (Mexico) =

Top 100 Mexico is a record chart published weekly by AMPROFON (Asociación Mexicana de Productores de Fonogramas y Videogramas), a non-profit organization composed by Mexican and multinational record companies. This association tracks record sales (physical and digital) in Mexico.

== Chart history ==
The yellow background indicates the best-performing album of 2006.

Chart date	Album	Artist	Reference
January 1	Grandes Éxitos	Luis Miguel	
January 15	La Voz de un Ángel	Yuridia	
January 22	La Voz de un Ángel	Yuridia	
February 5	La Voz de un Ángel	Yuridia	
February 12	La Voz de un Ángel	Yuridia	
February 19	La Voz de un Ángel	Yuridia	
February 26	La Voz de un Ángel	Yuridia	
March 5	La Voz de un Ángel	Yuridia	
March 19	Acompáñame	Yuri & Mijares	
March 26	Meds	Placebo	
April 2	Indeleble	Alejandra Guzmán	
April 9	Indeleble	Alejandra Guzmán	
April 16	Indeleble	Alejandra Guzmán	
April 23	Indeleble	Alejandra Guzmán	
Abril 30	Monkey Business	The Black Eyed Peas	
May 7	Monkey Business	The Black Eyed Peas	
May 21	Amor	Andrea Bocelli	
May 28	Amor	Andrea Bocelli	
June 4	Amor	Andrea Bocelli	
June 11	Limón y Sal	Julieta Venegas	
June 18	Limón y Sal	Julieta Venegas	
July 2	Limón y Sal	Julieta Venegas	
July 9	Sector Beat 100.9 Vol. 3	Various Artist	
July 16	Allison	Allison	
July 23	Memo Rex Commander y el Corazón Atómico de la Vía Láctea	Zoé	
July 30	Allison	Allison	
August 6	Oral Fixation, Vol. 2	Shakira	
August 13	Memo Rex Commander y el Corazón Atómico de la Vía Láctea	Zoé	
August 20	Memo Rex Commander y el Corazón Atómico de la Vía Láctea	Zoé	
September 3	Amar es Combatir	Maná	
September 10	Amar es Combatir	Maná	
September 24	Amar es Combatir	Maná	
October 1	Ananda	Paulina Rubio	
October 15	Amantes Sunt Amentes	Panda	
October 22	Amantes Sunt Amentes	Panda	
October 29	High School Musical	Various Artists	
November 26	Navidades	Luis Miguel	
December 3	Navidades	Luis Miguel	
December 10	Navidades	Luis Miguel	

The follow list contain the albums released in 2006 and peaked number one in México in the same year but the peak date is unknown.

Album	Artist	Reference
Guapa	La Oreja de Van Gogh	
Habla El Corazón	Yuridia	
Rudebox	Robbie Williams	
The Open Door	Evanescence	
Vencedor	Valentín Elizalde	
