= List of number-one albums of 2007 (Mexico) =

Top 100 Mexico is a record chart published weekly by AMPROFON (Asociación Mexicana de Productores de Fonogramas y Videogramas), a non-profit organization composed by Mexican and multinational record companies. This association tracks record sales (physical and digital) in Mexico. Since May 2013, some positions of the chart are published in the official Twitter account of AMPROFON including the number one position.

== Chart history ==
The yellow background indicates the best-performing album of 2007.

Chart date	Album	Artist	Reference
January 7	Vencedor	Valentín Elizalde	
January 14	Vencedor	Valentín Elizalde	
January 28	Vencedor	Valentín Elizalde	
February 4	Vencedor	Valentín Elizalde	
February 11	The Confesions Tour	Madonna	
February 18	Lobo Domesticado	Valentín Elizalde	
February 25	Lobo Domesticado	Valentín Elizalde	
March 18	Papito	Miguel Bosé	
March 25	Papito	Miguel Bosé	
April 1	Papito	Miguel Bosé	
April 8	Papito	Miguel Bosé	
April 15	Papito	Miguel Bosé	
April 22	Papito	Miguel Bosé	
April 29	Papito	Miguel Bosé	
May 6	Papito	Miguel Bosé	
May 13	Papito	Miguel Bosé	
May 20	Papito	Miguel Bosé	
May 27	Papito	Miguel Bosé	
June 3	Papito	Miguel Bosé	
June 10	Papito	Miguel Bosé	
June 17	Papito	Miguel Bosé	
June 24	Papito	Miguel Bosé	
July 1	Viento a favor	Alejandro Fernández	
July 8	Viento a favor	Alejandro Fernández	
July 15	Viento a favor	Alejandro Fernández	
July 22	Viento a favor	Alejandro Fernández	
July 29	Viento a favor	Alejandro Fernández	
August 5	Viento a favor	Alejandro Fernández	
August 12	T25	Timbiriche	
August 19	T25	Timbiriche	
August 26	T25	Timbiriche	
September 2	T25	Timbiriche	
September 9	Quién dijo Ayer	Ricardo Arjona	
September 16	Quién dijo Ayer	Ricardo Arjona	
September 23	Fantasía Pop	Belanova	
October 30	Fantasía Pop	Belanova	
October 7	Fantasía Pop	Belanova	
October 14	Sino	Café Tacuba	
October 21	Sino	Café Tacuba	
October 28	Sino	Café Tacuba	
November 4	Sino	Café Tacuba	
November 11	Sino	Café Tacuba	
November 18	Te quiero	Nigga	
November 25	Oral Fixation Tour	Shakira	
December 2	Entre Mariposas	Yuridia	
December 9	Oral Fixation Tour	Shakira	
December 16	15 años de éxitos	Alejandro Fernández	
December 23	Papitour	Miguel Bosé	
December 30	15 años de éxitos	Alejandro Fernández	
