= Irreemplazable =

EP by Beyoncé
- Released: August 27, 2007
- Genres: Latin pop; R&B
- Length: 31:04
- Languages: Spanish; English
- Labels: Columbia; Music World
- Producers: Eduardo Cabra; Jake Cohl; Ne-Yo; Olgui Chirino; Rudy Pérez; Timbaland; The Underdogs; Sean Garrett; Shakira; Stargate; Swizz Beatz

Beyoncé chronology
B'Day (2006)	Irreemplazable (2007)	The Beyoncé Experience Live (2007)

Singles from Irreemplazable
- 1. "Amor Gitano" Released: February 12, 2007

Irreemplazable (English: Irreplaceable) is the second extended play (EP) by American singer and songwriter Beyoncé. It was released on August 27, 2007, by Columbia Records and Music World Entertainment. Comprising Spanish re-recordings and remixes of songs from her second studio album B'Day (2006), it was initially featured as a bonus disc for the North American deluxe edition of B'Day in April 2007. The EP was produced by Cuban-American musician Rudy Pérez, who also helped with writing the songs in Spanish.

Irreemplazable received mixed reviews from music critics, who criticized its lack of content and the fact that it was released several months after the deluxe edition of B'Day. The EP peaked at number 105 on the US Billboard 200, and has sold 57,000 copies in the United States. "Bello Embustero", the Spanish version of "Beautiful Liar", was nominated for Record of the Year at the 8th Annual Latin Grammy Awards (2007).

== Background ==
Growing up in Houston, Texas, Beyoncé was surrounded by the Spanish language, and learned some Spanish as a child, which she later forgot. When re-recording songs for Irreemplazable, Beyoncé's vocal coach provided the Spanish lyrics phonetically, and each line was recorded up to four times for the EP. Beyoncé has stated that she intends to take up Spanish lessons in the future. She said of the EP's recording, "This is such an honor for me to be able to connect with all my fans. I had so much fun singing in Spanish. It reminded me of growing up in Houston". The Denver Post's John Wenzel interpreted the release of Irreemplazable as "an effort to meet the exploding market for Spanish language music".

== Release and promotion ==
Irreemplazable was released as the bonus disc on the deluxe edition of B'Day in the United States on April 3, 2007, before being released separately through Columbia Records and Music World Entertainment on August 28, 2007. iTunes Store began selling the EP on August 27, 2007. However, a remix of "Get Me Bodied" was available only on the individual release of Irreemplazable. Beyoncé appeared on Tr3s' television show Mi TRL on August 2, 2007, and showed a behind-the-scenes special, "Making of the Spanish EP". An exclusive DVD accompanied the EP in Walmart stores, containing behind-the-scenes footage and taped performances from The Beyoncé Experience and Beyoncé's appearance on The Early Show, as well as a documentary named "La Evolución Latina de Beyoncé" ("The Latin Evolution of Beyoncé").

== Music and lyrics ==
Irreemplazable is primarily an R&B and Latin pop album. The Spanish-language songs from the EP were written by Cuban American composer Rudy Pérez and he wrote the lyrics phonetically to help Beyoncé perform the songs in Spanish. "We spent hours and hours working on it. She wanted to make it perfect. She worked hard. That's why people are saying it sounds like she's fluent in Spanish", Perez added. Pérez changed some of the words in Spanish as he felt it they "didn't fit the music" and "doesn't make sense". He assisted with Beyoncé on pronouncing her r's in Spanish. Irreemplazable opens with "Amor Gitano", a duet with Alejandro Fernández originally from Fernández' fifteenth studio album, Viento a Favor. "Listen", a theme song from Dreamgirls, in which Beyoncé appears, was re-recorded under the title "Oye". The EP's title track is a Spanish version of "Irreplaceable", a song that was highly successful in its English recording. Three recordings of "Beautiful Liar" appear on Irreemplazable: a Spanish version (titled "Bello Embustero"), a remixed English version and a Spanglish version. A norteña remix of "Irreemplazable" is the EP's seventh track, while Timbaland's remix of "Get Me Bodied", which features vocals from Julio Voltio, closes Irreemplazable.

== Critical reception ==
Giving it two and a half stars, Andy Kellman of AllMusic said that "there's not that much to the disc," and alleged that it was unnecessary, concluding "if you're a die-hard Beyoncé fan, you'll probably feel jerked around a bit — especially if you bought B'Day when it came out in September 2006 and bought the deluxe edition seven months later, only to find out that the bonus material would later come out on its own (with a track not on the second disc of the deluxe edition!)." Kellman selected "Amor Gitano", "Irreemplazable" and the "Get Me Bodied" remix as the highlights of the EP. The EP led to Beyoncé receiving a nomination for Pop New Artist of the Year at the 2008 Lo Nuestro Awards, and "Bello Embustero" was nominated for Record of the Year at the 8th Annual Latin Grammy Awards.

== Accolades ==
Year	Award	Category	Result	Ref.
2007	Latin Grammy Award	Record of the Year ("Bello Embustero")	Nominated	
2008	Lo Nuestro Award	Pop New Artist of the Year	Nominated	

== Commercial performance ==
Irreemplazable debuted on the US Billboard 200 at number 105, selling over 6,000 copies. It remained on the chart for three weeks. On the Top R&B/Hip-Hop Albums, the EP made its entry at number forty-one the same week, and spent five weeks on the chart. Irreemplazable performed better on the Latin charts, debuting at number three on the Top Latin Albums and number two on the Latin Pop Albums. The EP stayed on the charts for twelve and thirteen weeks, respectively. As of 2010, Irreemplazable has sold 57,000 copies in the United States.

== Track listing ==
Irreemplazable track listing
No.	Title	Writer(s)	Producer(s)	Length
1.	"Amor Gitano" (with Alejandro Fernández)	Beyoncé Knowles; Jaime Flores; Reyli Barber	Rudy Pérez; B. Knowles	3:48
2.	"Oye"	B. Knowles; Henry Krieger; Scott Cutler; Anne Preven; Pérez	The Underdogs; B. Knowles; Perez^{[a]}	3:41
3.	"Irreemplazable"	B. Knowles; Mikkel S. Eriksen; Tor Erik Hermansen; Espen Lind; Amund Bjørklund; Shaffer Smith; Pérez	Stargate; B. Knowles; Smith^{[b]}; Perez^{[c]}	3:48
4.	"Bello Embustero"	Eriksen; Hermansen; B. Knowles; Amanda Ghost; Ian Dench; Pérez	Stargate; B. Knowles^{[d]}; Perez^{[e]}^{[c]}; Shakira^{[e]}^{[a]}; Olgui Chirino^{[a]}	3:20
5.	"Beautiful Liar" (Remix) (with Shakira)	Eriksen; Hermansen; B. Knowles; Ghost; Dench; Pérez	Stargate; B. Knowles; Shakira; Eduardo Cabra^{[e]}	3:01
6.	"Beautiful Liar" (Spanglish version) (featuring Sasha Fierce)	Eriksen; Hermansen; B. Knowles; Ghost; Dench; Pérez	Stargate; B. Knowles; Pérez^{[e]}^{[c]}; Shakira^{[e]}; Cabra^{[e]}	3:21
7.	"Irreemplazable" (Norteña Remix)	B. Knowles; Eriksen; Hermansen; Lind; Bjørklund; Smith; Pérez	Stargate; B. Knowles; Smith^{[b]}; Pérez^{[z]}	3:51
8.	"Get Me Bodied" (Timbaland Remix) (featuring Voltio)	B. Knowles; Solange Knowles; Kassem Dean; Sean Garrett; Makeba; Angela Beyincé	Swizz Beatz; B. Knowles; Garrett; Timbaland^{[f]}^{[e]}	6:14
Total length:				31:04

=== Notes ===
- ^{^a}: vocal producer
- ^{^b}: co-producer
- ^{^c}: Spanish-language vocal producer
- ^{^d}: producer and vocal producer
- ^{^e}: additional producer
- ^{^f}: remixer

== Personnel ==
Credits were adapted from AllMusic and the liner notes.

- April Baldwin – artists and repertoire
- Aaron Brougher – artists and repertoire
- Eduardo Cabra – production
- Olgui Chirino – vocal production
- Max Gousse – artists and repertoire
- Juli Knapp – artists and repertoire
- Quincy Jackson - marketing
- Beyoncé – executive production, production, vocal production
- Mathew Knowles – artists and repertoire, executive production, management
- Ne-Yo – production
- Rudy Pérez – production, remix production, vocal production
- Timbaland – production, remixing
- The Underdogs – production

== Charts ==
Chart (2007)	Peak position
Italy (FIMI)	3
US Billboard 200	105
US Top Latin Albums (Billboard)	3
US Top R&B/Hip-Hop Albums (Billboard)	41
