= Bien Acompañado =

Reyli

Studio album by Reyli
- Released: March 22, 2011
- Genre: Latin pop Rock en español
- Length: 67:40
- Label: Sony Music

Reyli chronology
Que Vueltas da la vida (2009)	Reyli (2011)	La Metamorfosis (2019)

Professional ratings
Review scores
Source	Rating

Bien Acompañado (Well Accompanied) is the fourth album by Mexican singer Reyli, released in 2011.

== Track listing ==
1. Asi es la Vida (featuring Joan Sebastian) - 4:23
2. Amor del Bueno (featuring Miguel Bosé) - 4:05
3. Alma Gemela (featuring Camila) - 3:44
4. La Descarada (featuring Diego Torres) - 3:48
5. Al Fin Me Armé De Valor (featuring Pepe Aguilar) - 3:51
6. ¿Qué Nos Pasó? (featuring Yuridia) - 3:52
7. Que Vueltas Da La Vida (featuring Elefante) - 3:45
8. De La Noche A La Mañana (featuring Miguel Rios) - 4:38
9. El Aguacero (featuring Rosana) - 4:28
10. La Que Se Fue (featuring Carlos Rivera) - 4:03
11. Desde Que Llegaste (featuring Rosario) - 3:38
12. El Abandonao (featuring David Summers) - 4:06
13. Elena (featuring La Unión) - 4:34
14. Perdóname En Silencio (featuring Playa Limbo) - 4:04
15. Todos Caben (featuring Presuntos Implicados) - 4:04
16. Ahora Tengo (featuring Ana Bárbara) - 3:17
17. Saltare Al Vacio (featuring Armando Manzanero) - 3:28

=== Album certification ===
Region	Certification	Certified units/sales
Mexico (AMPROFON)	3× Platinum	180,000^{^}
^{^} Shipments figures based on certification alone.
