= List of number-one albums of 2005 (Mexico) =

Top 100 Mexico is a record chart published weekly by AMPROFON (Asociación Mexicana de Productores de Fonogramas y Videogramas), a non-profit organization composed by Mexican and multinational record companies. This association tracks record sales (physical and digital) in Mexico.

== Chart history ==
Chart date	Album	Artist	Reference
May 15	Un Viaje	Café Tacuba	
May 22	Un Viaje	Café Tacuba	
May 29	Un Viaje	Café Tacuba	
June 5	Fijación Oral, Vol. 1	Shakira	
June 12	Fijación Oral, Vol. 1	Shakira	
June 19	Fijación Oral, Vol. 1	Shakira	
June 26	Fijación Oral, Vol. 1	Shakira	
July 3	Fijación Oral, Vol. 1	Shakira	
July 10	Fijación Oral, Vol. 1	Shakira	
July 17	Fijación Oral, Vol. 1	Shakira	
July 24	Fijación Oral, Vol. 1	Shakira	
July 31	Fijación Oral, Vol. 1	Shakira	
August 7	Fijación Oral, Vol. 1	Shakira	
August 14	Fijación Oral, Vol. 1	Shakira	
August 21	Fijación Oral, Vol. 1	Shakira	
August 28	Dulce Beat	Belanova	
September 4	Rosa Venus	Fobia	
September 11	México en la Piel	Luis Miguel	
September 18	La Voz de un Ángel	Yuridia	
September 25	Nuestro Amor	RBD	
October 2	Nuestro Amor	RBD	
October 16	La Voz de un Ángel	Yuridia	
October 23	La Voz de un Ángel	Yuridia	
October 30	La Voz de un Ángel	Yuridia	
November 6	México – Madrid: En Directo Y Sin Escalas	Alejandro Fernández	
November 13	México – Madrid: En Directo Y Sin Escalas	Alejandro Fernández	
December 18	Grandes Éxitos	Luis Miguel	
December 25	Adentro	Ricardo Arjona	

The follow list contain the albums released in 2005 and peaked number one in México in the same year but the peak date is unknown.

Album	Artist	Reference
X Diez	Intocable	
