= List of number-one albums of 2012 (Mexico) =

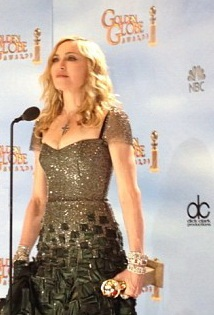
MDNA by Madonna, was her first studio album in ten years to reach the number one in Mexico.

Top 100 Mexico is a record chart published weekly by AMPROFON (Asociación Mexicana de Productores de Fonogramas y Videogramas), a non-profit organization composed by Mexican and multinational record companies. This association tracks record sales (physical and digital) in Mexico.

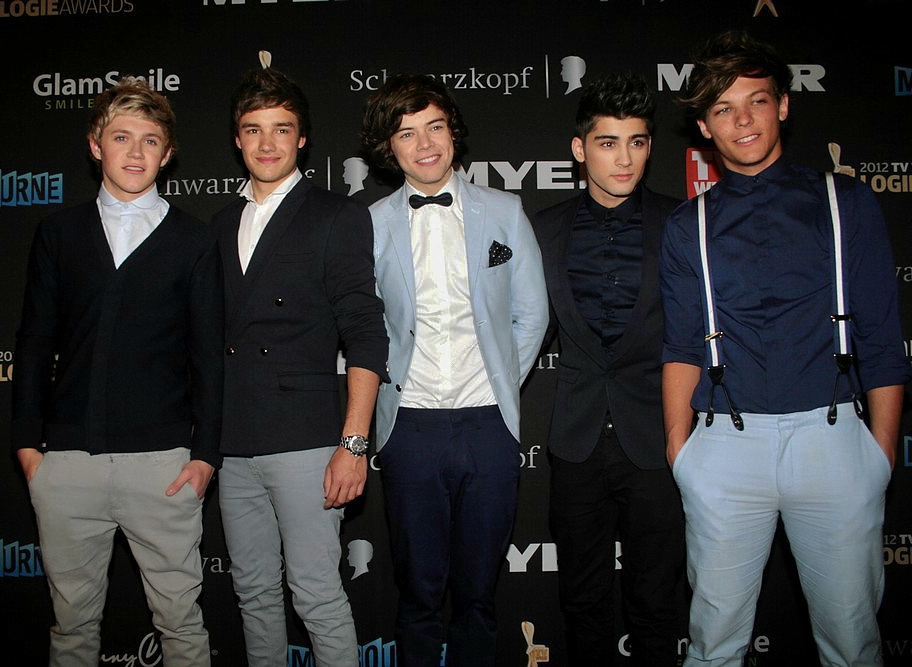
The boy band One Direction achieved two albums at number one.

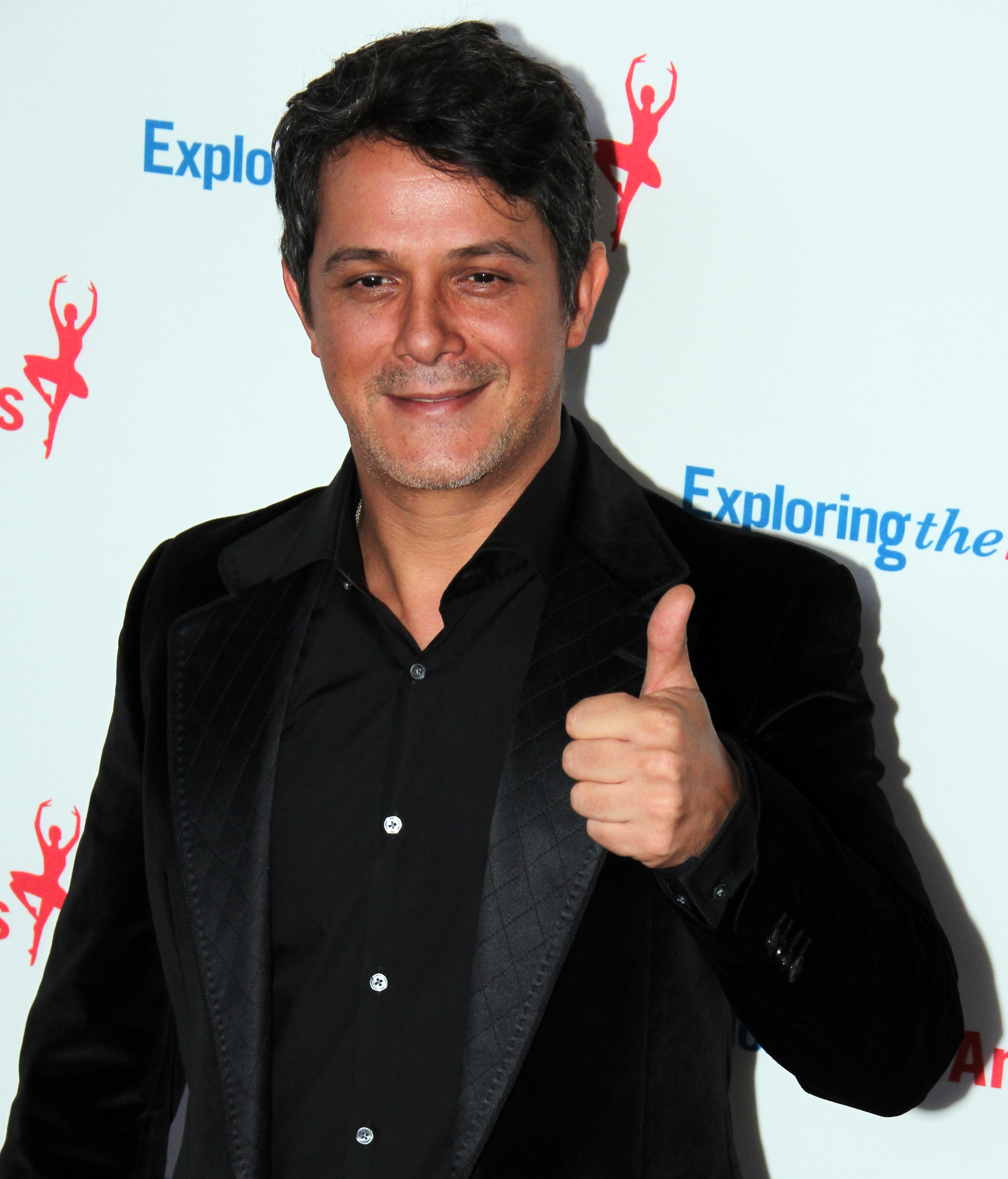
Spanish singer Alejandro Sanz has spent 4 weeks at number one. Selling 80,000 copies.

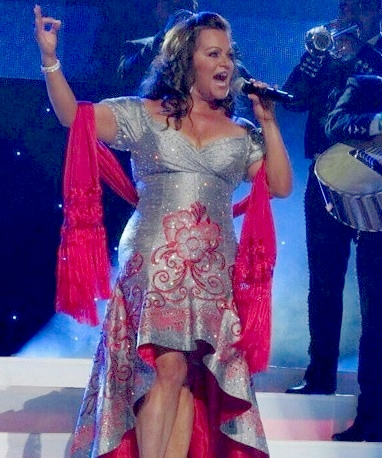
After her tragic death, Jenni Rivera albums reached the top of the chart.

== Chart history ==
The yellow background indicates the best-performing album of 2012.

Chart date	Album	Artist	Reference
January 1	Para Mi	Yuridia	
January 8	Para Mi	Yuridia	
January 15	Para Mi	Yuridia	
January 22	Para Mi	Yuridia	
January 29	Irreversible... 2012	La Arrolladora Banda El Limón	
February 5	Irreversible... 2012	La Arrolladora Banda El Limón	
February 12	Irreversible... 2012	La Arrolladora Banda El Limón	
February 19	21	Adele	
February 26	21	Adele	
March 4	21	Adele	
March 11	21	Adele	
March 18	21	Adele	
March 25	Bonanza	PXNDX	
April 1	MDNA	Madonna	
April 8	Up All Night	One Direction	
April 15	Up All Night	One Direction	
April 22	Up All Night	One Direction	
April 29	Up All Night	One Direction	
May 6	Up All Night	One Direction	
May 13	Sexto VI	Yahir	
May 20	Desde Rusia con Amor	Molotov	
May 27	Déjenme llorar	Carla Morrison	
June 3	MTV Unplugged	Juanes	
June 10	Up All Night	One Direction	
June 17	Up All Night	One Direction	
June 24	Believe	Justin Bieber	
July 1	Believe	Justin Bieber	
July 8	Believe	Justin Bieber	
July 15	Believe	Justin Bieber	
July 22	Up All Night	One Direction	
July 29	EME 15	EME 15	
August 5	Up All Night	One Direction	
August 12	Up All Night	One Direction	
August 19	Up All Night	One Direction	
August 26	Solstis	León Larregui	
September 2	Up All Night	One Direction	
September 9	Papitwo	Miguel Bosé	
September 16	Papitwo	Miguel Bosé	
September 23	Papitwo	Miguel Bosé	
September 30	La Música No Se Toca	Alejandro Sanz	
October 7	La Música No Se Toca	Alejandro Sanz	
October 14	La Música No Se Toca	Alejandro Sanz	
October 21	La Música No Se Toca	Alejandro Sanz	
October 28	El Objeto Antes Llamado Disco	Café Tacvba	
November 4	Papitwo	Miguel Bosé	
November 11	Take Me Home	One Direction	
November 18	Take Me Home	One Direction	
November 25	Take Me Home	One Direction	
December 2	Habítame Siempre	Thalía	
December 9	Habítame Siempre	Thalía	
December 16	La Misma Gran Señora	Jenni Rivera	
December 23	Joyas Prestadas: Pop	Jenni Rivera	
December 30	Joyas Prestadas: Pop	Jenni Rivera	
