= Amor Gitano =

2007 single by Beyoncé and Alejandro Fernández

Single by Alejandro Fernández and Beyoncé

from the album Viento a Favor and Irreemplazable
- Language: Spanish
- English title: "Gypsy Love"
- Released: February 12, 2007
- Recorded: January 2007
- Studio: The Beach House Recording, Miami Beach, Florida; Roc the Mic, New York City
- Genre: Latin pop; flamenco
- Length: 3:50
- Label: Columbia
- Songwriters: Beyoncé Knowles; Reyli Barba; Jaime Flores
- Producers: Beyoncé Knowles; Rudy Pérez

Alejandro Fernández singles chronology
"Qué Voy a Hacer con Mi Amor" (2005)	"Amor Gitano" (2007)	"Te Voy A Perder" (2007)

Beyoncé singles chronology
"Hollywood" (2006)	"Amor Gitano" (2007)	"Beautiful Liar" (2007)

Audio video
- "Amor Gitano" on YouTube

"Amor Gitano" (English: "Gypsy Love") is a Latin pop duet recorded by Mexican singer Alejandro Fernández and American singer-songwriter Beyoncé. The song contains a mixture of cultures, mostly influenced by the language of Fernández, that is Spanish, and Beyoncé's pop and R&B influences. Along with Jaime Flores and Reyli Barba, Beyoncé wrote the song, while Rudy Pérez and Beyoncé herself produced the song. "Amor Gitano" serves as the theme song of the telenovela El Zorro and it was released on February 12, 2007, during the premiere of the episode of the telenovela.

"Amor Gitano" generally received positive reception from music critics. While some of them complimented the vocal exchanges between both artists and the flamenco pop genre of the song, others criticized the song for being somehow offensive due to the stereotypical lyrics. Although it failed to make any impact on the main US Billboard Hot 100 chart, it charted on a few Billboard component charts, peaking at number twenty-three on the US Latin Pop Songs chart. Achieving multi-platinum certifications for ringtones and digital downloads in Spain, the song remained at the top of the Spanish Singles charts for thirteen weeks, becoming Beyoncé's second Spanish chart-topping single, the first being "Beautiful Liar" (2007). As of 2019, "Amor Gitano" is one of the best-selling singles in Spain of all time.

== Background and recording ==
"Amor Gitano" originated from the collaboration of Sony BMG's biggest talents and greatest assets. Kevin Lawrie, President of Sony BMG Latin America, contacted the Sony Entertainment Television Latin America as well as the producers of El Zorro to come up with a theme song for the telenovela. At the same time, Beyoncé and Fernandez were in the process of selecting material for their respective upcoming projects. Paul Forat, the Vice President of the Artists and repertoire division of Sony Entertainment Television Latin America, first heard the song from Reyli Barba and felt it could be perfect for Fernandez. Lawrie later contacted Mathew Knowles, President and CEO Music World Entertainment, about Beyoncé's Spanish material, and the duet song was recorded partly at The Beach House Recording Studios in Miami Beach, Florida and at the Rock the Mic Studios in New York in mid January 2007, with Rudy Perez.

In an interview with Billboard magazine, Beyoncé discussed how excited she was about the collaboration stating, "I loved working with Alejandro on 'Amor Gitano.' When I was asked to record with him, I immediately said 'yes.' He is extremely talented." Alejandro Fernández stated that as the production and recording of his album was nearly over, he was told that Beyoncé wanted to record a duet with a Latino male for her next album. He stated: "So when they suggested it, I liked the idea. I thought it was spectacular. So we went, I gave her the song and she liked it [...] We recorded it in one day. She seemed like a fine lady to me, very humble, with a great voice."

According to Beyoncé's publicity material, she grew up in a Texas area where Spanish was a popular language and heard it all the time. She studied the language as a child but forgot it as she grew up and rose to fame. Beyoncé was planning to take Spanish lessons because she had learned the language again and then the song by imitating the sounds. She stated: "I had the best coach; I did it phonetically, every sentence I recorded maybe four times." A "Making of ..." video was created while Beyoncé was recording the song with Fernández. While creating the song, Beyoncé had producer Rudy Perez coach her in her Spanish, as she did not want to misrepresent the language.

== Music and theme ==
"Amor Gitano"
As Fernández sings "I'm your gypsy, your pilgrim," Knowles replies "I'm going to love you even if they take my heart away."

The song was written by Reyli Barba, formerly of the band Elefante, who has worked with Fernández on multiple occasions. Additional writing was done by Jaime Flores and Beyoncé. "Amor Gitano" was produced by Beyoncé as well as Rudy Perez. Labeled as inappropriate for those under the age of 14 by Common Sense Media, the song features negative stereotyping of Romani or Gypsy people. The entire song is sung in Spanish; the English translation of the title is "Gypsy Love".

The song contains hints of flamenco pop and strong lyrics dominate the entire track. After opening with "traditional flamenco sounds and generic Gypsy Kings-style guitarra riffs", "Amor Gitano" adds hints of pop music. As the song progresses, it transcends into a ballad, demonstrating romance, excitement and extreme emotions. "Amor Gitano" is completely dominated by flamenco guitars which is interlaced with alternating vocals. With what has been described as a "thrilling blend of the stars" by James P. Steyer of Common Sense Media, both Beyoncé and Fernández exchange "heated declaration of love and passion." Lyrically the song contains a broader, melodramatic concept of love with Beyoncé and Fernández exchanging words between verses, for instance in one part, Fernández sings "I'm your gypsy, your pilgrim" and Beyoncé replies "I'm going to love you even if they take my heart away."

== Release and reception ==
"Amor Gitano" debuted on February 12, 2007, on the premiere episode of Telemundo's El Zorro novella. The song was the first included on Beyonce's second studio album B'Day, where it was included on the second disc of the albums deluxe edition which included an additional six Spanish-language tracks. The song was released as a bonus track on all European releases of the original B'Day albums. "Amor Gitano" also serves as the opening track of Beyoncé's EP Irreemplazable. "Amor Gitano" was also included on Fernández's twelfth studio album Viento a favor (2007). The promo shoots of the album Viento a favor highlighted the collaboration between Fernández and Beyoncé.

The song garnered generally mixed to positive reception from music critics, most of whom noted that the song may be taken offensively because of its stereotypical lyrics. The song has been described as a "plaintive ballad" by Joseph Woodard of Entertainment Weekly. San Francisco-based non-profit organization, Common Sense Media gave the song a mixed review, stating that it should remain an album track rather than a single. They stated, "With Beyoncé doing a pretty good job of phonetically singing in Spanish (the occasional verb phrase doesn't blend), this is more about novelty than about being a great single." Agustin Gurza of the Los Angeles Times gave the song a positive review, naming it a stand-out track off of Alejandro's Viento a favor. Jason Birchmeier of Allmusic complimented the writing as well as the production on the song and called it "over-bearing in a positive way." As a positive spoof of the song's premiere on Zorro: La Espada y la Rosa, Billboard created a wanted poster for Fernández, which stated he was wanted "for stealing the hearts of millions" with his performance in the song.

== Commercial performance ==
"Amor Gitano" mainly sold in markets with a Latin demographic. It failed to make any impact on the main US Billboard Hot 100. However, the single charted on the US Latin Pop Songs chart, and peaked at number twenty-three. "Amor Gitano" was more successful on Spanish charts. The song peaked at number one on both the Spanish Singles and Download charts. It remained at the summit of the singles chart for thirteen weeks from May 28, 2007, to August 27, 2007, until later replaced by "Lamento Boliviano" by Dani Mata. "Amor Gitano" is also Beyoncé's second number-one hit on the Spanish Download Chart (the first was "Beautiful Liar") as well as her first Spanish-language number-one hit. The song was certified eight-times platinum (160,000 copies) for downloads and sixteen-times platinum (320,000 copies) for ringtone sales by the Productores de Música de España (PROMUSICAE). It is ranked at number one on the list of best-selling singles in Spain.

== Credits and personnel ==
Adapted from the B'Day's liner notes.

- Aureo Baqueiro – vocal direction
- Andrés Bermúdez – recording
- Reyli Barba – writing
- Jasmin Cruz – backing vocals
- Paco "El Sevillano" – gypsy chant
- Alejandro Fernández – vocals
- Jaime Flores – writing
- Paul Forat – artists and repertoire
- Max Gousse – artists and repertoire
- Beyoncé Knowles – writing, production, vocals
- Mathew Knowles – artists and repertoire
- David Lopez – assistant recording, assistant mixing
- Vlado Meller – mastering
- Rudy Pérez – production, arrangement, keyboards, programming, Spanish guitars, backing vocals, vocal direction
- Clay Perry – keyboards, programming, Pro Tools editing, recording
- Rene Lus Toledo – Spanish guitars
- Bruce Weeden – mixing
- Shane Woodley – assistant recording

== Charts ==
=== Weekly charts ===
Chart	Peak position
CIS Airplay (TopHit)	130
Spanish Download Chart	1
Spanish Ringtone Chart	1
US Latin Pop Airplay (Billboard)	23

=== Year-end charts ===
Chart (2007)	Position
Spanish Download Chart	1
Spanish Ringtone Chart	1

== Certifications ==
Region	Certification	Certified units/sales
Spain (Promusicae) Digital download	8× Platinum	160,000^{*}
Spain (Promusicae) Ringtone	16× Platinum	320,000^{*}
^{*} Sales figures based on certification alone.

== See also ==
- List of best-selling singles in Spain
