= List of number-one songs of 2002–2007 (Mexico) =

This is a list of the number-one songs between 2002 and 2007 in Mexico. Chart rankings are based on airplay across radio states in Mexico utilizing the Radio Tracking Data, LLC in real time. Between 2002 and 2005, Monitor Latino did not publish a General chart, instead it published three separate charts: "Pop", "Grupero" (Grupera Ballads and Regional Mexican music, it later changed its name to "Regional") and "Sonidero" (Tropical music, it later changed its name to "Tropical" and was discontinued in 2005). In 2007, Monitor Latino began to publish a General chart as well.

== 2002 ==
| Issue Date | Pop | | | Grupero | | | Sonidero | | |
| Issue Date | Song | Artist(s) | Ref. | Song | Artist(s) | Ref. | Song | Artist(s) | Ref. |
|---|---|---|---|---|---|---|---|---|---|
| August 17 | "Tú y yo" | Thalía | | "Si tú quisieras" | Los Temerarios | | "Déjame entrar" | Carlos Vives | |
| October 21 | "Tú y yo" | Thalía | | "Una lágrima no basta" | Los Temerarios | | "Déjame entrar" | Carlos Vives | |
| December 4 | N/A | | | "No me sé rajar" | Banda el Recodo | | N/A | | |

== 2003 ==
| Issue Date | Pop | | | Grupero | | | Sonidero | | |
| Issue Date | Song | Artist(s) | Ref. | Song | Artist(s) | Ref. | Song | Artist(s) | Ref. |
|---|---|---|---|---|---|---|---|---|---|
| February 28 | "Es por ti" | Juanes | | N/A | | | N/A | | |
| March 3 | N/A | | | "No sé vivir sin ti" | Los Temerarios | | N/A | | |
| June 3 | N/A | | | "Me falta valor" | Pepe Aguilar | | N/A | | |
| August 13 | "Mariposa traicionera" | Maná | | "Yo la amo" | Pepe Aguilar | | "Ríe y llora" | Celia Cruz | |

== 2004 ==
| Issue Date | Pop | | | Grupero | | |
| Issue Date | Song | Artist(s) | Ref. | Song | Artist(s) | Ref. |
|---|---|---|---|---|---|---|
| February 2 | "Cuidarte el alma" | Chayanne | | N/A | | |
| February 9 | "Cuidarte el alma" | Chayanne | | N/A | | |
| March 1 | N/A | | | "Vanidosa" | Cuisillos | |
| March 8 | N/A | | | "En los puritos huesos" | La Arrolladora Banda El Limón | |

== 2005 ==
| Issue Date | Grupero | | | Tropical | | |
| Issue Date | Song | Artist(s) | Ref. | Song | Artist(s) | Ref. |
|---|---|---|---|---|---|---|
| April 1 | "Mi credo" | K-Paz de la Sierra | | "Gasolina" | Daddy Yankee | |

== 2007 ==
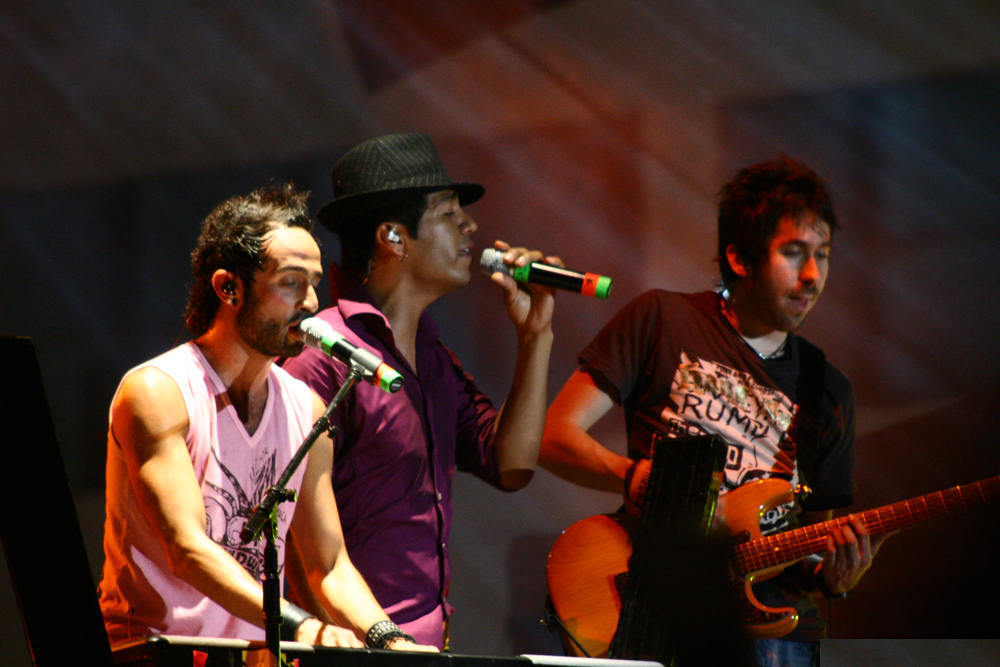
"Todo cambió" by Mexican band Camila (pictured) was the most successful song of the year in Mexico.

Monitor Latino began issuing a General chart in 2007. In addition, the "Grupero" chart was renamed as "Regional", an "Inglés" (English) chart was added, and the "Tropical" chart was discontinued.

=== Chart history (General and Pop) ===
| Issue Date | General | | Pop | | Ref. |
| Issue Date | Song | Artist(s) | Song | Artist(s) | Ref. |
|---|---|---|---|---|---|
| August 5 | "Te voy a perder" | Alejandro Fernández | "N/A" | | |
| August 12 | "Te voy a perder" | Alejandro Fernández | "Intocable" | Aleks Syntek | |
| August 19 | "Te voy a perder" | Alejandro Fernández | "Intocable" | Aleks Syntek | |
| August 26 | "Te voy a perder" | Alejandro Fernández | "Dímelo" | Enrique Iglesias | |
| October 7 | "El eco de tu voz" | Playa Limbo | "El eco de tu voz" | Playa Limbo | |
| October 14 | "Te quiero" | Nigga | "El eco de tu voz" | Playa Limbo | |
| October 28 | "Te quiero" | Nigga | "N/A" | | |
| November 4 | "Te quiero" | Nigga | "Te quiero" | Nigga | |
| November 11 | "Te quiero" | Nigga | "Te quiero" | Nigga | |
| November 18 | "Te quiero" | Nigga | "N/A" | | |
| November 25 | "Te quiero" | Nigga | "N/A" | | |
| December 2 | "Te quiero" | Nigga | "Me enamora" | Juanes | |
| December 9 | "Te quiero" | Nigga | "Me enamora" | Juanes | |
| December 16 | "Te quiero" | Nigga | "N/A" | | |
| December 23 | "Te quiero" | Nigga | "N/A" | | |
| December 31 | "Te quiero" | Nigga | "N/A" | | |

=== Chart history (Regional and English) ===
| Issue Date | Regional | | Inglés | | Ref. | |
| Issue Date | Song | Artist(s) | Song | Artist(s) | Ref. | |
|---|---|---|---|---|---|---|
| July 29 | "N/A" | | "Todo Cambio" | Camila | | |
| August 5 | "N/A" | | "Todo Cambio" | Camila | "Makes Me Wonder" | Maroon 5 |
| August 12 | "Lágrimas del corazón" | Grupo Montez de Durango | "Todo Cambio" | Camila | "Makes Me Wonder" | Maroon 5 |
| August 19 | "De ti exclusivo" | La Arrolladora Banda El Limón | | | "Makes Me Wonder" | Maroon 5 |
| August 26 | "De ti exclusivo" | La Arrolladora Banda El Limón | "Fluorescent Adolescent" | Arctic Monkeys | | |
| October 7 | "Estos celos" | Vicente Fernández | "1973" | James Blunt | | |
| October 14 | "Estos celos" | Vicente Fernández | "1973" | James Blunt | | |
| November 4 | "Estos celos" | Vicente Fernández | "Gimme More" | Britney Spears | | |
| November 11 | "Qué bonito" | Banda el Recodo | "Gimme More" | Britney Spears | | |
| December 2 | "Qué bonito" | Banda el Recodo | "Gimme More" | Britney Spears | | |
| December 9 | "Qué bonito" | Banda el Recodo | "Hot" | Avril Lavigne | | |

== See also ==
- List of number-one albums of 2007 (Mexico)
