= Eres =

Eres (English: "You Are") may refer to:

- "Eres" (Shakira song), 1993
- "Eres" (Alejandro Fernández song), 2008
- "Eres" (Café Tacuba song), 2003
- "Eres", a song by Anahí from her album Inesperado, 2016
- "Eres", a song by José María Napoleón, 1975, later covered by multiple artists
- "Eres", a song by Lucero from her 1993 eponymous album
- "Eres", a song by Massiel, 1982
- "Eres", a song by Sergio Dalma, 2015
- "Eres", a song by Cruz Martínez y Los Super Reyes from their album Cumbia con Soul, 2009
- "Eres", a song by Tercer Cielo from their album Llueve, 2007
- Revista ERES, a Mexican magazine

== See also ==
- Eres Tú (disambiguation)
