= Te Voy A Perder =

2007 song by Alejandro Fernández

Single by Alejandro Fernández

from the album Viento a Favor
- Released: April 16, 2007
- Recorded: 2006–2007
- Studio: Santito Studios (Buenos Aires, Argentina); Igloo Music Studios (Los Angeles, California); Brava! Music (Mexico City, Mexico); South Beach Studios (Miami, Florida)
- Genre: Latin pop
- Length: 4:10
- Label: Sony BMG Norte
- Songwriter(s): Áureo Baqueiro · Leonel García
- Producer(s): Áureo Baqueiro

Alejandro Fernández singles chronology
"Amor Gitano" (2007)	"Te Voy A Perder" (2007)	"No Se Me Hace Fácil" (2007)

"Te Voy A Perder" (English: I Am Going To Lose You) is a song written by Áureo Baqueiro and Leonel García, recorded by Mexican performer Alejandro Fernández, and released as second single from Viento a Favor (2007), It was released on April 16, 2007 (see 2007 in music). A version Mexican singer Leonel García featuring American duo Ha*Ash was released on August 20, 2013.

== Song information ==
According to the singer's official website , the song is "a love declaration about the imminent break-up from the person you love" . The track was nominated for "Song of the Year" at the "Oye Awards" in Mexico, which was awarded to "Te Lo Agradezco, Pero No" by Alejandro Sanz and Shakira.

=== Music video ===
The music video for this single was directed by Simon Brand, who directed another two videos for the artist ("Me Dediqué a Perderte" and "Que Lástima"). The shooting took place in Mexico City and Tampico, Tamaulipas, on May 12 to 14, 2007. The plot is about a love story (starred by Jaidy Michel) and also includes Fernández making a performance on a crane ship.

The main performance of the song (with Alejandro and his band) is on the ship's helipad. This ship was built in Russia in 1994 and originally was the drillship Arktikshelf and starting in 2005 was reconstructed to the crane vessel Garzprom 2. The aerial shot captures the size of the ship. For this video a crew of 200 people was needed.

Along with the performance, a couple is shown with romantic attitudes, but as the history develops it is also shown that he does not trust her and tries to find evidence of infidelity, only to find out that she was not cheating on him and loses her.

The video received a nomination for the "Oye Award" for Video of the Year, losing to "Me Muero" by Spanish band La Quinta Estación.

== Chart performance ==
In the United States, on the Billboard Hot Latin Tracks the single entered at number 49 in the week of June 9, 2007, climbing to number 24 the following week and eight weeks later (August 11) peaking at number 9. The track spent 20 weeks on this chart, and ranked at number 38 in the year-end chart of 2007.

Chart	Position
Mexico (Monitor Latino)	1
US Hot Latin Songs (Billboard)	9
US Latin Pop Airplay (Billboard)	2

== Leonel García and Ha*Ash version ==
"Te Voy A Perder"

Single by Leonel García, Ha*Ash

from the album Todas Mías
- Released: August 20, 2013
- Genre: Latin pop
- Length: 4:50
- Label: Sony BMG Norte
- Songwriter(s): Áureo Baqueiro · Leonel García
- Producer(s): Áureo Baqueiro

Leonel García singles chronology
"Una vida" (2012)	"Te Voy A Perder" (2013)	"Te Besé" (2013)

Ha*Ash singles chronology
"¿De Dónde Sacas Eso?" (2012)	"Te Voy A Perder" (2013)	"Perdón, Perdón" (2014)

"Te Voy A Perder" is a song by Mexican singer Leonel García featuring American duo Ha*Ash. It was released on August 20, 2013 as the third single from his studio album Todas Mías (2013).

A music video for "Te Voy A Perder" was released on August 20, 2013. It currently has over 24 million views. The track peaked at number 9 in the Mexico Airplay and at number 22 in the Mexico Espanol Airplay charts in the México.

Chart performance

Chart	Position
Mexico (Billboard Mexican Airplay)	9
Mexico (Billboard Espanol Airplay)	22

== See also ==
- List of number-one songs of 2007 (Mexico)
