= No Se Me Hace Fácil =

Single by Alejandro Fernández

from the album Viento a Favor
- Released: September 17, 2007
- Recorded: 2006–2007
- Studio: Santito Studios (Buenos Aires, Argentina); Igloo Music Studios (Los Angeles, California); Brava! Music (Mexico City, Mexico); South Beach Studios (Miami, Florida)
- Genre: Latin pop
- Length: 3:46
- Label: Sony BMG Norte
- Songwriter(s): Gian Marco
- Producer(s): Áureo Baqueiro

Alejandro Fernández singles chronology
"Te Voy A Perder" (2007)	"No Se Me Hace Fácil" (2007)	"Eres" (2008)

"No Se Me Hace Fácil" (English: It's Not Easy For Me) is a song written by Gian Marco and produced by Áureo Baqueiro, recorded by Mexican performer Alejandro Fernández, and released as the third single from Viento a Favor (2007), It was released on September 17, 2007 (see 2007 in music). The song was the theme song for the Televisa's Mexican telenovela Tormenta en el Paraíso (2007-2008), produced by Juan Osorio.

== Music video ==
The music video for this single was directed by Pablo Croce. The actress Ana de la Reguera stars in the video.

== Chart performance ==
In United States, on the Billboard Hot Latin Songs the single peaked at number 17. In Mexico the track peaked at number 1.

Chart (2007/2008)	Peak position
US Billboard Hot Latin Songs	17
US Billboard Latin Pop Airplay	6
