= Frágil (Allison song) =

2006 single by Allison

Single by Allison

from the album Allison
- Released: March 25, 2006
- Genre: Pop punk; alternative rock
- Length: 2:44
- Label: Sony BMG
- Songwriter(s): Erik Canales; Manuel Ávila; Erik Espartacus
- Producer(s): Armando Ávila

Allison singles chronology
"Frágil" (2006)	"Me Cambió" (2006)

Frágil is the debut single of the Mexican rock band Allison. It was released on March 25, 2006 via Sony BMG. It was released as the first single from her debut studio album Allison. The music video has more than 25 million views on YouTube.

== Background ==
The song was released some time before participating in the XTREME FEST. At the national level, his video was released on April 17, 2006. The band played the song at "Los Premios MTV Latinoamérica" in 2006.

== Music video ==
The video for the song shows the band playing at a girl's house as they follow her to school. The video is the start of a series of music videos.

== Certifications ==
Region	Certification	Certified units/sales
Mexico (AMPROFON)	Gold	10,000^{*}
^{*} Sales figures based on certification alone.
