= Ya Te Olvidé =

1988 song by Rocío Dúrcal

Single by Rocío Dúrcal

from the album Como Tu Mujer
- Released: 1988
- Genre: Pop
- Length: 2:58
- Songwriter: Marco Antonio Solís
- Producer: Marco Antonio Solís

Music video
- "Ya Te Olvidé" on YouTube

"Ya Te Olvide" ("I Have Already Forgetten You") is a song originally recorded by Spanish singer Rocio Durcal for her studio album, Como Tu Mujer (1988). The song was written and produced by the Mexican musician Marco Antonio Solís.

It was covered by Mexican singer Yuridia for her fifth studio album, Para Mí (2011). Puerto Rican singer Ivy Queen also recorded the song for Arthur Hanlon's album, Piano y Mujer II (2022). Mexican singer Natanael Cano released a corrido tumbado cover on 15 May 2024, with its music video containing footage of one of his live performances.

== Yuridia version ==
"Ya Te Olvidé"

Single by Yuridia

from the album Para Mí
- Released: October 31, 2011
- Genre: Pop • Soft rock
- Length: 3:31
- Songwriter: Marco Antonio Solís
- Producer: Armando Ávila

Yuridia singles chronology
"No Me Preguntes Más" (2011)	"Ya Te Olvidé" (2011)	"Lo Que Son Las Cosas" (2012)

Music video
- "Ya Te Olvidé" on YouTube

A new version of "Ya Te Olvidé" was released by singer Yuridia on October 31, 2011. It was released as the lead single of her fifth studio album, Para Mí (2011).

=== Music video ===
The official music video was released on December 7, 2011 through Yuridia's official YouTube channel. In the video clip the interpreter is seen on the side of a small lake, surrounded by leafy trees, the interpreter appears in the course of the video with two dresses, first with a flowery one and a second white dress.

On November 7, 2015, the singer confirmed through her official Twitter account that the video had more than 108 million views. This video clip is currently the one with the most views, exceeding 506 million views, only on the YouTube digital platform.

=== Charts ===
Chart (2011-2012)	Peak Position
US Mexico Airplay (Billboard)	10
US Hot Latin Songs (Billboard)	24
US Latin Airplay (Billboard)	24
US Latin Pop Airplay (Billboard)	5

=== Certifications ===
Certifications for "Ya Te Olvidé"
Region	Certification	Certified units/sales
Mexico (AMPROFON)	3× Diamond+Platinum+Gold	990,000^{‡}
^{‡} Sales+streaming figures based on certification alone.

== Arthur Hanlon and Ivy Queen version ==
"Ya Te Olvidé"

Single by Arthur Hanlon and Ivy Queen

from the album Piano y Mujer II
- Released: November 23, 2022
- Genre: Latin pop
- Length: 3:07
- Label: Sony Music Latin
- Songwriter: Marco Antonio Solis
- Producers: Arthur Hanlon; Eddie Perez

Ivy Queen singles chronology
"Bye Bye" (2022)	"Ya Te Olvidé" (2022)	"Calentura" (2022)

Arthur Hanlon released his first installment in the Piano y Mujer series on April 9, 2021. An HBO concert special premiered on April 16, 2021. It included collaborations with Kany García, Natalia Jiménez, ChocQuibTown's "Goyo." According to Hanlon, "A piano and a female voice are the ideal combination." He revealed that during the recording process for Piano y Mujer, they were "looking to make beautiful, meaningful music, especially in the middle of the pandemic."

In 2022, Ivy Queen recorded a redition of the song for Arthur Hanlon's album Piano y Mujer II. A recording of Queen's 2010 hit, "La Vida Es Así" in bachata, along with an outro jam, entitled "We Are Going to Make It Tonight" with Catalina García, Ha-Ash, Lupita Infante and Debi Nova were also recorded and included on the album, which was released on November 23, 2022. The three songs formed part of Hanlon's second HBO concert special, 'Piano y Mujer', produced by Loud and Live and Sony, which debuted November 29, 2022 on HBO Max in the United States and Latin America.

In February 2023, Queen and Hanlon performed the song to close the 35th annual Lo Nuestro awards ceremony, where she was presented with the Musical Legacy Award, honoring her for her musical career. Billboard called the performance "impressive." The magazine continued, saying Queen "displayed her vocal versatility." It serves as the theme song for the Telemundo telenovela, "Amor y Traición," ("Love and Betrayal), a Spanish-translated version of Turkish drama, "Kaderimin Oyunu" ("Game of Destiny").

=== Music video ===
The official music video was released on November 25, 2022 through Queen's official YouTube channel. It has received over 2 million views as of December 2024. The video was filmed during Queen's performance for the HBO Max special of 'Piano y Mujer II,' with the stage being "decorated with an exuberant garden." Queen performed the song next to Hanlon playing the piano, along with an all-female band.

=== Reception ===
Queen's rendition of the song was met with positive sentiments. Lucas Villa writing for American media company Remezcla claimed the song to "show a different side to her artisty," praising her for capturing the emotion of the original song. Signal Ratner-Arias for Billboard called it one of Queen's "most sublime renditions." An editor for Honduran newspaper La Prensa, said the ballad "surprises," claiming the artist to "step out of her comfort zone" on the track.

=== Credits ===
Credits are adapted from Apple Music.

Performing Artists

- Arthur Hanlon — Piano
- Ivy Queen — performer
- Dan Needham — drums
- Josh Esther — bass
- David Vazquez — bass
- Sergio Cavalieri — guitar
- Camilo Velandia — guitar
- Eddie Perez — keyboards
- Kelvin Santos — güiro
- Willie Smith — organ
- John Calzavara — guitar
- Pat Seymour — tenor saxophone
- Cisco Dimas — trumpet
- Miles Fiedler — trombone
- Ray Díaz — percussion
- Steven Cruz — guitar
- Lala Nascimiento — background vocals
- Pinto Picasso — background vocals
- Jason Edmunds — background vocals
- Aliethia Evcans — background vocals
- Tayanna Monestime — background vocals

Composition and lyrics

- Marco Antonio Solis — songwriter
- Pat Seymour — arranging

Production and engineering

- Arthur Hanlon — producer
- Eddie Perez — producer, mixing engineer, recording engineer
- Pinto Picasso — vocal producer, recording engineer
- Jean Rodgriguez — recording engineer, vocal producer
- Andrei Fossari — mastering engineer

== Natanael Cano version ==
"Ya Te Olvidé"

Single by Natanael Cano
- Released: May 15, 2024
- Genre: Sierreño; ranchera
- Length: 3:36
- Label: Interscope Records
- Songwriter: Marco Antonio Solis
- Producers: Natanael Cano; Jimmy Humilde

Natanael Cano singles chronology
"300 Noches" (2024)	"Ya Te Olvidé" (2024)	"YCQVM" (2024)

Natanael Cano performed the song for the first time in November 2023 at a show in Guadalajara, Jalisco, Mexico. On May 7, 2024, it was announced that the song would have an official release. It was released on May 15, 2024.

=== Music video ===
The official music video was released on May 15, 2024 through Cano's official YouTube account. The video includes a performance of the song in Hermosillo, Sonora, Mexico. It has received over 43 million views as of December 2024.

=== Reception ===
The Latin Times selected the song among the best new releases of the week. An editor for Remezcla called his rendition of the song a "heartfelt performance," saying Cano dug deep to emote the original song's emotion and ballad essence. El Mexicano said the cover gave the song a contemporary twist, claiming it to "reinvent this emotional song."

=== Charts ===
Chart (2024)	Peak Position
Global 200 (Billboard)	189
Global 200 Excl. US (Billboard)	124
US Hot Latin Songs (Billboard)	30
Mexico Songs (Billboard)	4

== Other cover versions ==
- Los Apasionados Santiagueños, non-album single (2024)
- Sele Vera y Pampas de Bariloche, non-album single (2024)
- Nathan Galante, Una copa por cada reina (2023)
- Américo, Por Ellas (2021)
- Karina, mujeres (2017)
- Los 4 (featuring Laritza Bacallao), non-album single (2017)
- Cumbre Norteña, Evolución (2014)
- Luz María, Luz María (2013)
- Tito Nieves, Dos Canciones clásicas de Marco Antonio Solís (2008)
- Los Sabrosos del Merengue, Sin Fronteras (1992)
