= Eres Tú (disambiguation) =

Eres tú is a 1973 song by Spanish band Mocedades.

Eres Tú may also refer to:

== Music ==
- Josh Santana: Eres Tú, a 2009 album by Josh Santana
- "Eres Tú", a 1932 song composed by Miguel Sandoval for Italian tenor Beniamino Gigli
- "Eres Tú", a 1965 song by Los Brincos
- "Eres Tú", a 2006 single by Belanova, a Spanish version of "What I've Been Looking For" from High School Musical
- "Eres Tú", a 2012 song by Alex Cuba
- "Eres Tú", a 2012 song by Carla Morrison from Déjenme Llorar

== See also ==
- Eres (disambiguation)
