= Que Vueltas da la Vida =

Que vueltas da la Vida

Studio album by Reyli
- Released: June 9, 2009
- Genre: Latin pop Rock en español
- Length: 44:13
- Label: Sony Music Latin

Reyli chronology
Fe (2007)	Que vueltas da la Vida (2009)	Bien Acompañado (2011)

Professional ratings
Review scores
Source	Rating
Allmusic	3.5/5 stars

Que Vueltas da la Vida (What Twists and Turns Life Takes) is the third studio album recorded by Mexican singer-songwriter Reyli Barba. This album was released by Sony Music Latin on 9 June 2009.

== Track listing ==
All tracks are written by Reyli Barba.

No.	Title	Length
1.	"Que Vueltas da la Vida"	3:45
2.	"Que Nos Paso?"	4:02
3.	"La Verdad"	4:04
4.	"Por Ti"	4:10
5.	"El Mejor Dia de Mi Vida"	4:06
6.	"Casate Conmigo"	4:10
7.	"Vida Nueva"	3:32
8.	"Alma Gemela"	3:52
9.	"Ando Por las Nubes"	5:17
10.	"Ahora Tengo"	3:16
11.	"En la Carcel de Tu Adios"	4:00
