= Allison (album) =

Studio album by Allison
- Released: June 26, 2006
- Recorded: 2005–2006
- Genre: Alternative rock; pop punk
- Length: 30:59
- Label: Sony BMG
- Producer: Armando Ávila

Allison chronology
Allison (2006)	Memorama (2008)

Allison is the debut studio album by Mexican rock band Allison, released on June 26, 2006 by Sony BMG.

Originally said album was planned to be produced by Soundgüich, a Mexican independent label and would be distributed by Sony BMG, however, this second label decided to produce the disc on its own.

== Background ==
The album was produced by Armando Avila, the album was positioned at number 1 on the Mexican charts. The album was one of the best sellers in Mexico in 2006, selling 50,000 copies in just one month, obtaining the gold record certification by AMPROFON. By the end of 2006, the album had gone platinum in Mexico for more than 100,000 copies sold.

== Track listing ==
No.	Title	Length
1.	"Perdido (Lost)"	3:07
2.	"Frágil (Fragile)"	2:44
3.	"80's"	2:56
4.	"Aquí (Here)"	4:01
5.	"Ya No Te Amo (I Don't Love You Anymore)"	3:52
6.	"No Más de Ti (No More From You)"	3:06
7.	"Me Cambió (She Changed Me)"	2:56
8.	"Mi Destino (My Fate)"	3:27
9.	"Llama Por Favor (Call Please)"	2:13
10.	"Addisi"	2:42
Total length:		30:59

Special Edition
No.	Title	Length
11.	"Calcetas (Socks) (301 Izquierda cover)"	2:29
12.	"Always (Axpi cover)"	4:50
13.	"Otro Día Más (One More Day) (Bye Sami cover)"	3:26
14.	"Quiero Saber (I Want to Know) (Hule Spuma cover)"	3:12
15.	"Mario Bros 3 (Taller Para Niños cover)"	1:59
16.	"Amor Eterno (Eternal Love) (Juan Gabriel cover)"	4:00
Total length:		50:52

== Personnel ==
All credits adapted for AllMusic

Allison

- Erik Canales - lead vocals, rhythm guitar
- Abraham Isael Jarquín "Fear" - lead guitar
- Manuel Ávila "Manolín" - bass, backing vocals
- Diego Stommel - drums (in special edition)

Additional Musicians

- Roy Cañedo - drums
- Güido Laris - backing vocals, vocal director

Production

- Armando Ávila - production, arranger, bajo sexto, backing vocals, directed, engineer, guitar, acoustic guitar, keyboards, mixed, realization
- Emilio Ávila - executive coordinator
- Michkin Boyzo - production coordination
- Guillermo Gutiérrez Leyva - A&R, direction
- Juan Carlos Moguel - engineer
- Jorge Rodriguez - assistant engineer
- Ignacio Segura - assistant engineer
- Don Tyler - mastering
- Arturo Zuñiga - artist direction, photography

== DVD ==
1. Frágil (music video)
2. Aquí (music video)
3. Me Cambio (music video)
4. Ya No Te Amo (live video)
5. 80's (music video)
6. La Historia (documental)

== Charts ==
=== Weekly charts ===
Chart (2006)	Peak position
Mexican Albums Chart	1

=== Year-End charts ===
Chart (2006)	Peak position
Mexican Albums Chart	10

== Certifications ==
Region	Certification	Certified units/sales
Mexico (AMPROFON)	Platinum	100,000^{^}
^{^} Shipments figures based on certification alone.

== See also ==
- List of best-selling albums in Mexico
