= En la Luna =

Reyli

Studio album by Reyli
- Released: September 14, 2004
- Recorded: 2003–04
- Genre: Latin pop
- Length: 50:35
- Label: Sony

Reyli chronology
Reyli (2004)	Fe (2007)

Professional ratings
Review scores
Source	Rating
Allmusic	4/5 stars

En la Luna (On the Moon) is the debut album by Mexican singer Reyli, released on September 14, 2004 (see 2004 in music) by Sony International.

== Track listing ==
=== Original Release ===
1. "Calma" – 4:14 (Ornelas; Reyli)
2. "Hasta Que Amanezca" – 3:53 (Reyli)
3. "Amor del Bueno" – 4:07 (Reyli)
4. "Tonto Enamorado" – 3:33 (Reyli)
5. "Al Fin Me Armé de Valor" – 3:31 (Reyli)
6. "Desde Que Llegaste" – 3:35 (Reyli)
7. "Ayúdame" – 4:40 (Reyli)
8. "Tú" – 3:11 (Mario Domm; Reyli)
9. "La Descarada" – 3:25 (Reyli)
10. "Nos Quisimos" – 4:59 (Reyli)
11. "Sé Quíén Soy [Demo]" – 3:56 (Juantorena; Paníagua; Reyli)
12. "No Era Necesarío [*]" – 4:11 (Ornelas; Reyli)

=== En La Luna [SPECIAL EDITION] (2006) ===
#	Title	
Disc 1 (CD)
13.	"No Era Necesario [Full Version]"	3:51
14.	"Al Fin Me Armé de Valor [Reggaetón Version]"	6:13
Disc 2 (DVD)
1.	"La Descarada" [Live]	
2.	"Amor del Bueno" [Live]	
3.	"Desde Que Llegaste" [Live]	
4.	"Amor del Bueno" [Music Video]	
5.	"Desde Que Llegaste" [Music Video]	
6.	"Al Fin Me Armé de Valor" [Music Video]	
7.	"No Era Necesario" [Music Video]	

== Sales and certifications ==
Region	Certification	Certified units/sales
Mexico (AMPROFON)	2× Platinum+Gold	250,000^{^}
^{^} Shipments figures based on certification alone.
