= Nada es color de rosa =

Studio album by Yuridia
- Released: September 28, 2009 (Mexico)
- Recorded: 2009
- Genre: Latin pop
- Length: 44:09
- Label: Sony Music Latin
- Producer: Etore Grenci

Yuridia chronology
Remixes (2008)	Nada es color de rosa (2009)	Para Mí (2011)

Nada es color de rosa (transl. Nothing's Colored Pink, i.e. Nothing's Easy) is the fourth solo studio album by Mexican artist Yuridia.

== Development ==
After a 2-year recording hiatus, Yurida returned to the studio to record this album. Most of the songs were composed by Julio Ramirez Eguia, member of Mexican band, Reik, Ettore Grenci, and Fernando Pantini. The album was recorded and mixed at Sonic Ranch Studios, El Paso (TX) and Hensons Studios, Los Angeles (CA). Nada Es Color De Rosa was produced by Ettore Grenci and engineered / mixed by Fabrizio Simoncioni.

== Promotion ==
As the release of the album neared, Yuridia went on a promotional tour which took her to cities within the Mexican region, as well as the United States. She also appeared on Spanish-speaking television shows, more noticeably, the show that helped launch her career, La Academia. The producer, Ettore Grenci, composed most of the songs, hand in hand with the singer, who is also the author of two songs on the album, "Un Paso Más" and "Todas Las Noches", a duet with the Italian group Sonohra. This album has sold 120,000 copies worldwide and has been certified Platinum + Gold. The first single, Irremediable, was the #5 Top Song in Mexico. The second single, Me Olvidarás, topped the Top 10 songs, peaking at #9. Contigo, the third single, was on the Top Monitor Latino, peaking at #12. Yuridia released No Me Preguntes Más as her fourth single, which has peaked at the Top Monitor Latino at #2.

== Track listing ==
No.	Title	Length
1.	"Irremediable (Hopeless) (Julio Ramirez/Monica Velez/Etore Grenci)"	3:50
2.	"Contigo (With You) (Ettore Grenci/Cecy Leos)"	3:40
3.	"Llévame (Take Me) (Ettore Grenci/Cecy Leos/Francesco Chiari)"	4:09
4.	"Un Paso Más (Another Step) (Ettore Grenci/Yuridia/Fernando Pantini/Cecy Leos)"	3:44
5.	"Como La Marea (Like The Waves) (Ettore Grenci/Mónica Vélez)"	4:12
6.	"Me Olvidarás (You Will Forget Me) (Fernando Pantini/Mónica Vélez)"	4:12
7.	"Sin Miedo De Caer (Not Afraid To Fall) (Ettore Grenci/Fernando Pantini/Mónica Vélez)"	4:18
8.	"Sobrenatural (Supernatural) (Ettore Grenci/Fernando Pantini/Francesco Chiari/Mónica Vélez)"	3:42
9.	"Todas Las Noches (Every Night) (Yuridia/Ettore Grenci/Fernando Pantini/Julio Ramirez)"	4:06
10.	"Amor En Desamor (Love In Loveless) (Fernando Pantini/Julio Ramirez/Angela Davalos)"	3:50
11.	"No Me Preguntes Más (Don't Ask Me Anything Else) (Ettore Grenci/Francesco Chiari/Mónica Vélez)"	3:59

== Singles ==
- "Irremediable"
- "Me Olvidaras"
- "Contigo"
- "No Me Preguntes Más"

== Charts ==
The album debuted at No. 91 on the AMPROFON chart, and then went on to move up to peak at No. 1. A month after its release, Nada Es Color De Rosa received Gold for 45,000 copies. The album was certified Platinum for selling over 80,000 copies. Its last certification has been Platinum + Gold for 120,000 copies.

Chart (2009)	Peak position
US Heatseekers Albums (Billboard)	26
US Top Latin Albums (Billboard)	14
US Latin Pop Albums (Billboard)	4

== Sales and certifications ==
Region	Certification	Certified units/sales
Mexico (AMPROFON)	2× Platinum	120,000^{‡}
^{‡} Sales+streaming figures based on certification alone.

== Release history ==
Region	Date
Mexico	September 28, 2009
United States	October 9, 2009
