= Entre Mariposas =

Studio album by Yuridia
- Released: December 4, 2007 (U.S.), October 30, 2007 (Mexico)
- Genre: Latin pop
- Length: 44:59
- Label: Sony Music Latin
- Producer: Javier Calderon

Yuridia chronology
| Habla El Corazón (2006) | Entre Mariposas (2007) | Remixes (2008) |

Entre Mariposas (Among Butterflies) is the third solo album by Mexican singer Yuridia. The album was highly publicized for being the singer's first work to contain new material, penned by Reyli, Ilan Chester, Mario Domm and herself.

== Track listing ==
| No. | Title | Length |
|---|---|---|
| 1. | "En Su Lugar" (Calderon; Etore Grenci; Yuridia Gaxiola) | 3:45 |
| 2. | "Me Pierdo" (Calderon; María Bernal) | 3:31 |
| 3. | "Colgada A Ti" (Jorge Muñoz-Cobo; Rafael Esparza-Ruiz; Yuridia Gaxiola) | 3:17 |
| 4. | "Ahora Entendí" (Mario Domm; Yuridia Gaxiola) | 3:45 |
| 5. | "Ganas De Volar" (Calderon; Reyli Barba) | 3:36 |
| 6. | "Sin Ti" (Maldonado; Ramirez) | 3:31 |
| 7. | "Enamorada" (Ilan Chester) | 4:35 |
| 8. | "Más De Lo Que Pido" (Calderon; Mario Domm) | 3:26 |
| 9. | "Yo Por Él" (Maldonado; Salvador Rizo) | 3:36 |
| 10. | "Un Día Más" (Brant; Noel Schajris) | 4:39 |
| 11. | "Se Me Va La Vida" (Genaro Gaxiola) | 3:41 |
| 12. | "Ya No" (Calderon; Ramirez) | 3:30 |
| 13. | "En El Amor No Se Manda (Featuring Carlos)" (Rivera/Gaxiola) | 3:30 |

== Singles ==
1. Ahora Entendí

2. Yo Por Él

3. En Su Lugar

== Charts ==
Released in late 2007, the album quickly shot up the charts and peaked at number 1, her third album to do so, despite competition from Shakira and RBD. Entre Mariposas was the best selling album at the Mexican music store Mixup for five consecutive weeks.

The album's first single, Ahora Entendí (written by both Yuridia and Camila frontman Mario Domm), was the fastest rising single of the year, debuting in the lower half of the Mexican Top 100 and reaching the top 40 in three weeks. The single is also Yuridia's first to feature an official music video. Weeks later, "Ahora Entendi" reached the #1 Peak.

The second single, Yo Por Él, peaked at #1 on the Mexican charts.

In the Latin US market, Yuridia debuted at number 13, her highest charting album. Entre Mariposas also charted in the top ten of the Heatseekers chart.

The third single, En Su Lugar, was the principal theme of the soap opera "Secretos del alma" of TV Azteca.

| Chart (2007) | Peak position |
|---|---|
| US Heatseekers Albums (Billboard) | 7 |
| US Top Latin Albums (Billboard) | 13 |
| US Latin Pop Albums (Billboard) | 7 |

== Sales and certifications ==
| Region | Certification | Certified units/sales |
|---|---|---|
| Mexico (AMPROFON) | 2× Platinum | 200,000^{‡} |
^{‡} Sales+streaming figures based on certification alone.
