= Eres (Alejandro Fernández song) =

Single by Alejandro Fernández

from the album Viento a Favor
- Released: February 2008
- Genre: Latin pop
- Length: 3:55
- Label: Sony/BMG
- Songwriter: Juan Fernando Fonseca
- Producer: Aureo Baqueiro

Alejandro Fernández singles chronology
"No Se Me Hace Fácil" (2007)	"Eres" (2008)	"Sin Consideracion" (2008)

"Eres" (Eng.: You Are) is a song written by Juan Fernando Fonseca, recorded by Mexican singer Alejandro Fernández, and included on the album Viento a Favor.

== Release ==
The track was released as the third single from the album Viento a Favor while the singer performed on his world tour.

== Charts ==
Chart (2008)	Peak position
US Hot Latin Songs (Billboard)	27
US Latin Pop Airplay (Billboard)	9
