= Elefante (Mexican band) =

Mexican rock band

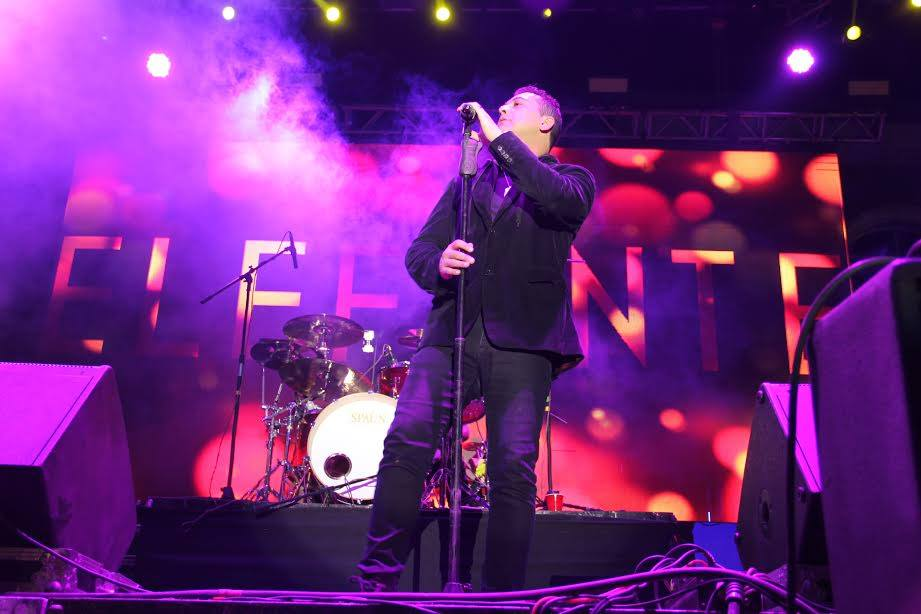

Background information
- Origin: Mexico City, Mexico
- Genres: Rock en Español, Latin pop
- Years active: 2000–present
- Labels: Marila Récords
- Members: Ahis; Ivan “Iguana” Suarez; Javier “Javi” Ortega; Rafael "Rafa" Loar; Alberto "G. Tracks" Pórtela
- Past members: Reyli Barba; Jorge Martínez Guevara
- Website: www.elefanteoficial.com

Elefante is an alternative rock and pop rock band formed in Mexico City in the early 1990s. They have released five albums, and their self-titled release was nominated for a Latin Grammy Award in 2005.

== History ==
The group first came to prominence when they opened for Joaquín Sabina at a show at Mexico City's National Auditorium. After several tours of the Americas, opening for Shakira and Maná, their lead singer Reyli left to pursue a solo career in 2003. As a replacement they recruited Jorge Martínez Guevara, former lead singer of the group Caos, who performed on their 2005 album Elefante. He left the group in 2007, and songwriter/guitarist Rafael "Rafa" Loar and Javier “Javi” Ortega assumed vocal duties on subsequent releases.

== Discography ==
- El Que Busca Encuentra (2001)
- Lo Que Andabamos Buscando (2002)
- Elefante (2005)
- Resplandor (2007)
- E:87600 (2012)
- Sinfónico (2020)
