= Allison (band) =

Mexican rock band

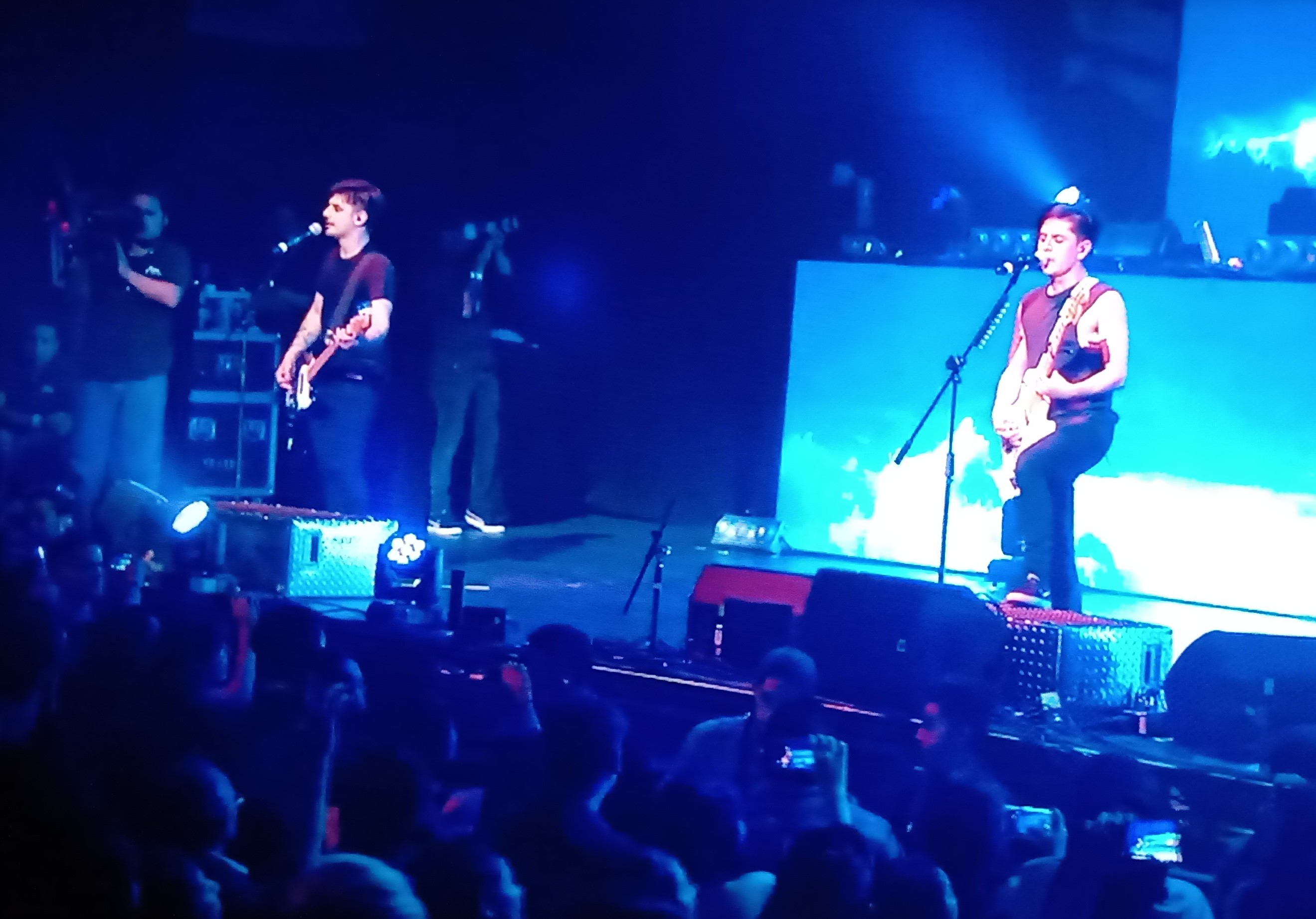
- Allison performing in 2017

Background information
- Origin: Mexico City, Mexico
- Genres: Alternative rock; pop punk; power pop; easycore
- Years active: 2002–present
- Label: Nitido Records Sony
- Members: Erik "Erik" Canales; Alfie Percastegui; Abraham "Fear" Jarquin; Diego "Diego" Stommel
- Past members: Manuel "Manolin" Avila; Gabriel Arroyo; David Vidal; Juan Angeles; Esteban Agama
- Website: allison.mx

Allison is a Mexican rock band from Mexico City, Mexico, that formed in 2002. They were nominated for the Latin Grammy Awards in 2013.

== History ==
Allison was started by Erik "Erik" Canales and Manuel "Manolin" Avila in 2002. They had known each other in high school for reasons other than music and had individual musical projects before founding Allison, but none were successful. They decided to create Allison along with two former members of a band Canales was in. Canales said he suggested the name after reading a poem about the true meaning of love: "Allison is the girl you're falling in love with and she with you, but still you don't know her."

The band began to perform in their own town and quickly began to gain fans. As their popularity grew, the band travelled more, which led band members to drop out of high school to focus on their music career.

In 2003 they met Paco Zepeda, who would become their manager, and started working on demos and songs to present to some transnational labels. Zepeda presented the project to the executives of Sony/BMG and the record label decided to sign them. From December 2005 to mid-February 2006, Allison's debut album was recorded. The album was produced by Armando Ávila, Paco Erick Zepeda, and Spartacus; vocal direction was conducted by Guido Laris.

At that time, they did not have a permanent drummer and drums on the album were recorded by Roy Cañedo of Thermo. The mastering was conducted by Don Tayler, who had previously worked with the bands Korn and Jimmy Eat World.

Their eponymous debut album sold more than 300,000 units in Mexico and was certified platinum. It reached number one in sales on AMPROFON and was a remained on that chart for 14 weeks. It also charted on Tower Records in Mexico City, where it held a spot for eight weeks. When Allison released, band members were only 21 years old. According to Canales, the instant superstardom was overwhelming for the band, saying "[Sony Music Entertainment] found us, signed us and our first record became a golden record within a month. Everything happened very fast. It was crazy."

The album reached gold status in Colombia and sold well in the United States, South America, Central America, Spain, France, Turkey, and Poland.

Due to the popularity of the album as well as their live performances, the band was awarded a two-month, 25-million-pesos ($2,146,531 USD) advertising contract by Doritos in Mexico upon the release of their first album. They went on to secure endorsement campaigns from Gibson Guitars, Vans Mexico, Red Bull, Xbox 360, Paco Rabanne in 2007 and 2008, Jolly Rancher in 2007, and Coca-Cola in 2007.

In 2006, Allison earned an MTV Latin American award for "Best New Artist-North" and played the coveted "closing act" spot at the awards ceremony. That same year, the band was nominated om "Best Rock Group" and "Best New Group" categories for Mexican music awards OYE.

In 2007, Allison was nominated "Best Alternative Artist" for the VMAs.

From 2006 to mid-2007 band members returned to the studio to work on new songs for a follow-up album and a special-edition rerelease of Allison.

In January 2008 the band recorded their second studio album, Memorama, which was released May 5 of that year.

In 2010, group members were involved in serious accident on the way to Oaxaca, near the city of Pinotepa Nacional, when their car was struck head-on by a driver who had drifted into oncoming lanes. Their car rolled three times in the accident, and bassist Manolin suffered a near career-ending injury when a part of the vehicle's hood came through the windshield and impaled his hand, crushing bones and severing nerves. The footwell of his seat was completely destroyed in the accident, he said in 2012, and had he not instinctively curled into a fetal position just before impact, he would have lost his legs. The driver of the other vehicle survived but did not render aid or call for help, instead abandoning his car and fleeing the scene. The driver was never caught and remains at large.

The accident caused the band to take a hiatus in order for Manolin to recover from his injuries, but he did return to perform by 2012, stating "“Sigo aquí y hay que seguir de frente" ("I'm still here and we have to keep going").

On October 1, 2012, they released their third studio album, 120 Km/hr., marking their return. On October 9, they released their first single "16" and began the album's initial tour, titled "120 km/hr UnderTour 2012." A second tour of the album was held in 2013 titled "Come Again Tour 2013."

In 2014 Manolin left the band to concentrate on a new musical project, Dolores de Huevos.

In 2015, Allison left Sony and decided to create their own record label, Nítido Records. The reason they parted from Sony, according to Canales, was due to creative differences and wanting different things overall, explaining that it was hard working for a company where the people were working for the label and not for the bands. "It was hard for us when we quit from Sony because we were used to people doing everything for us," Canales said in a 2019 interview. "We were always fighting with the label because we didn’t want to do this show or that interview,”

In 2016, the band released their fourth album, Todo Está Encendid, under their own label.

== Performances ==
Allison performed more than 192 shows throughout Mexico in 2006, including a sold-out performance of the 3,500-seat Teatro Metropolitan in Mexico City.

Allison has played with Yellowcard, Fall Out Boy, Over It, NHOI, National Product, Bring Me the Horizon, Jaguares, Paramore, Chiodos and Molotov.

Allison played eight dates of the Warped Tour 2007 and was the only Latin American band playing the tour that year. The band has performed in the southwestern United States, including San Antonio, McAllen, and El Paso. Allison played at the South by Southwest music festival in Austin, Texas, in 2007 and 2008.

In 2022, Allison announced a 15-show international tour in 2023 and 2024 with dates in six countries, including Mexico, the United States, Columbia, Ecuador, Peru, and Spain.

== Members ==
Current members

- Erik "Erik" Canales – lead vocals, rhythm guitar (2002–present)
- Abraham "Fear" Jarquin – lead guitar (2005–present)
- Diego "Diego" Stommel – drums (2006–present)
- Alfie Percastegui – bass, backing vocals (2013–present)

Former members

- Gabriel Arroyo – drums (2002–2004)
- Juan Angeles – drums (2004–2005)
- Manuel "Manolín" Ávila – bass, backing vocals (2002–2013)
- Esteban Agama – lead guitar (2002–2003)
- David Vidal – lead guitar (2003–2005)

Touring members

- Roy Cañedo – drums (2006)

== Discography ==
Studio albums

- Allison (2006, released in 2007)
- Memorama (2008)
- 120Km/h (2012)
- Todo Está Encendido (2016)

EPs

- Allison (2005)

Live albums

- Todo Está Encendido (En Vivo desde Teatro Metropólitan) (2017)

== Videography ==
- "Frágil" (2006)
- "Aquí" (2006)
- "Me Cambió" (2007)
- "Ya No Te Amo" (2007)
- "80`s"(2007)
- "Amor Eterno" (2008)
- "Memorama" (2008)
- "Baby Please" (2008)
- "Algo que decir" (2009)
- "Luna Amarga" (2013)
- "Matar o Morir" (2014)
- "120Km/h" (2015)
- "Vamos otra vez" (2015)
- "Señorita a mi me gusta su style" (2015)
- "Tú" (2016)
- "Miedo" (2017)
- "Asesino" (2017)
- "El Juego" (2018)
- "El Príncipe" (2020)
