= Habla El Corazón =

Studio album by Yuridia
- Released: October 31, 2006 (Mexico) December 5, 2006 (United States)
- Recorded: 2006
- Genre: Pop
- Length: 45:01
- Label: Sony Music Latin

Yuridia chronology
La Voz de un Ángel (2005)	Habla El Corazón (2006)	Entre Mariposas (2007)

Habla El Corazón is the Mexican singer Yuridia's second album, which was released on December 5, 2006, in the United States and October 31, 2006, in Latin America.

== Information ==
Habla El Corazón (The Heart Speaks) contains covers from various international rock songs of the 1980s and early 1990s. Nine songs are sung in Spanish and "The Rose" in English.

The first single from this album was "Como Yo Nadie Te Ha Amado," a cover version of Bon Jovi's "This Ain't A Love Song." On the day of its release, Habla El Corazón reached #1 in the Mexican Top 100 albums chart and debuted at #15 in the Billboard Latin Albums chart, topping Yuridia's previous album, which peaked at #16. Recently, Habla El Corazón peaked at number #14 which has now beaten her first album.

"Como Yo Nadie Te Ha Amado" was released in October 2006 and quickly gained airplay in various stations across Latin America. It peaked within the top 5 in Mexico and in the top 20 in Latin America. "Como Yo" has become Yuridia's most successful song in the U.S., peaking at 16 in the Hot Latin Tracks chart.

In March 2007, "Habla El Corazon," the second single, was released and charted in the Mexican Top 100.

This album has sold to date 630,000 copies (365,000 in Mexico, 250,000 in United States and 15,000 copies in Latin America).

== Track listing ==
No.	Title	Length
1.	"Siempre Te Amaré" "(Every Breath You Take)"	3:54
2.	"Como Yo Nadie Te Ha Amado" "(This Ain't a Love Song)"	4:22
3.	"Habla el Corazón" "(Listen to Your Heart)"	4:54
4.	"Otro Día Más" "(Just Another Day)"	4:19
5.	"Todo lo Que Hago lo Hago Por Ti" "((Everything I Do) I Do It for You)"	4:02
6.	"Eclipse Total del Amor" "(Total Eclipse of the Heart) featuring Patricio Borguetti"	5:24
7.	"Estar Junto a Ti" "(Angel)"	4:26
8.	"Regresa a Mí" "(Un-Break My Heart)"	4:24
9.	"The Rose"	3:53
10.	"El Hombre del Piano" "(Piano Man)"	5:19

== Singles ==
- "Como Yo Nadie Te Ha Amado"
- "Habla el Corazón"
- "Eclipse Total del Amor"

== Charts ==
Chart (2006)	Peak position
US Heatseekers Albums (Billboard)	1
US Top Latin Albums (Billboard)	14
US Latin Pop Albums (Billboard)	5

== Sales and certifications ==
Region	Certification	Certified units/sales
Mexico (AMPROFON)	3× Platinum	300,000^{‡}
United States (RIAA)	Platinum (Latin)	100,000^{^}
^{^} Shipments figures based on certification alone.^{‡} Sales+streaming figures based on certification alone.
