= Viento a favor =

Viento A Favor

Studio album by Alejandro Fernández
- Released: June 26, 2007 (CD); October 30, 2007 (CD/DVD)
- Recorded: 2006–2007
- Studio: Santito Studios (Buenos Aires, Argentina); Igloo Music Studios (Los Angeles, California); Brava! Music (Mexico City, Mexico); South Beach Studios (Miami, Florida)
- Genre: Latin pop
- Length: 48:13
- Label: Sony BMG Norte
- Producer: Áureo Baqueiro

Alejandro Fernández chronology
México - Madrid: En Directo Y Sin Escalas (2005)	Viento A Favor (2007)	15 Años De Éxitos (2007)

Viento A Favor (CD/DVD)
- Cover for the Limited Edition

Singles from Viento A Favor
- 1. "Amor Gitano" Released: February 12, 2007; 2. "Te Voy A Perder" Released: April 16, 2007; 3. "No Se Me Hace Fácil" Released: September 17, 2007; 4. "Eres" Released: February 11, 2008; 5. "Sin Consideracion" Released: May 12, 2008

Professional ratings
Review scores
Source	Rating
Allmusic	4/5 stars

Viento A Favor (Tailwind) is the 12th studio album recorded by Mexican performer Alejandro Fernández. It was released by Sony BMG Norte on June 26, 2007 (see 2007 in music).

== Album information ==
The album was produced by Mexican singer-songwriter Áureo Baqueiro and the singer works again with the composers: Gian Marco, Reyli Barba and Leonel García. And this time, he invites Fonseca and the other half of Sin Bandera, and Noel Schajris. The release date was set on June 26, 2007. For the press conference to introduce the album to the media, the singer gathered all the people involved in Tequila, Jalisco, to talk about the tracks and the production .

=== Recording ===
The album was recorded in Buenos Aires, Argentina, Los Angeles, California, Mexico City, Mexico and Miami, Florida. Alejandro Fernández chose the 11 tracks (since "Amor Gitano" was previously recorded with Beyoncé), from 500 songs. Making the final cut the compositions from Gian Marco, Tres De Copas, Reyli Barba, Fonseca, Leonel García and Noel Schajris (from the Mexican group Sin Bandera).

=== Singles released ===
The video for the first single ("Te Voy A Perder") was shot in Mexico City and Tampico, and directed by Simon Brand. On August 27, 2007, the video for the second single ("No Se Me Hace Facil") was shot in Los Angeles, California and directed by Pablo Croce .

== Track listing ==
No.	Title	Writer(s)	Length
1.	"Te Voy A Perder"	Áureo Baqueiro · Leonel García	4:10
2.	"A Manos Llenas"	Jaime Flores · Karen Juantorena	4:28
3.	"Tanto Amar"	Leonel García	4:14
4.	"Amenaza de Lluvia"	Raúl Ornelas	3:36
5.	"Eres"	Juan Fernando Fonseca	3:55
6.	"No Se Me Hace Fácil"	Gian Marco	3:46
7.	"Estabas Ahí"	Reyli Barba	4:21
8.	"Sin Cosideración"	Leonel García	3:33
9.	"Solitario y Solo"	Claudia Brant · Noel Schajris	4:23
10.	"Sueño Contigo"	Gian Marco	4:25
11.	"Amor Gitano" (with Beyoncé)	Beyoncé Knowles · Jaime Flores · Reyli Flores	3:50
12.	"Cuando Estemos Juntos"	Áureo Baqueiro	3:34
Total length:			48:13

== Chart performance ==
The album debuted at No. 73 on the Billboard 200 chart, No. 2 on the Billboard Top Latin Albums chart, and No. 1 on the Billboard Latin Pop Albums survey on the July 14, 2007, issue. As of July 11, 2007, the album has sold 16,295 copies in the US.

=== Album ===
Chart (2007–2008)	Peak position
Mexican Albums Chart	1
Spanish Albums Chart	2
US Billboard 200	73
US Billboard Top Latin Albums	2
US Billboard Latin Pop Albums	1

=== Singles ===
Year	Chart	Track	Peak
2007	Billboard Latin Pop Airplay	Te Voy A Perder	2
2007	Billboard Hot Latin Songs	Te Voy A Perder	9
2007	Billboard Latin Pop Airplay	No Se Me Hace Facil	6
2007	Billboard Hot Latin Songs	No Se Me Hace Facil	17

== Sales and certifications ==
Region	Certification	Certified units/sales
Argentina (CAPIF)	Gold	20,000^{^}
Mexico (AMPROFON)	2× Platinum+Gold	250,000^{^}
Spain (Promusicae)	Gold	40,000^{^}
^{^} Shipments figures based on certification alone.
