= Para Mí =

2011 album by Yuridia

Studio album by Yuridia
- Released: December 6, 2011 (Mexico); December 13, 2011 (Latin America); December 20, 2011 (U.S.)
- Genre: Latin pop
- Length: 39:44
- Label: Sony Music Latin
- Producer: Armando Ávila

Yuridia chronology
Nada es Color de Rosa (2009)	Para Mí (2011)	6 (2015)

Singles from Para Mí
- 1. "Ya Te Olvidé" Released: October 31, 2011; 2. "Lo Que Son Las Cosas" Released: February 29, 2012

Para Mí is the fifth solo album by Mexican singer Yuridia.

== Development ==
After a 2-year hiatus to focus on her personal life, Yurida returned to the studio. Details emerged about the new album via a note on her official Facebook page announcing the release of her new single, Ya te Olvidé, to radio stations on October 31, 2011.

It was later announced that the album would be released in Mexico on December 6, 2011, followed by a Latin America release date of December 13, then in the U.S. on December 20.

== Promotion ==
As part of a promotional tour, Yuridia visited major Mexican cities. Her first concert after the release of her newest effort, in which she performed new material, was held in Chilpancingo.

== Track listing ==
No.	Title	Length
1.	"Con Solo una Mirada"	3:45
2.	"Ya Te Olvidé"	3:31
3.	"Pienso en Ti"	3:52
4.	"A Dónde Va el Amor"	3:44
5.	"Si Quieres Verme Llorar"	3:06
6.	"Enamorada y Herida"	3:43
7.	"Señora"	3:42
8.	"Noche de Copas"	3:08
9.	"Lo Que Son las Cosas"	3:54
10.	"Quererte a Ti"	3:45
11.	"Bailando Sin Salir de Casa"	3:34

== Charts ==
The album debuted at No. 1 on the AMPROFON charts and was certified Gold for selling over 30,000 copies. A week later, the album was certified Platinum for selling over 60,000 copies. On January 9, 2012, it was announced that Para Mi had been certified Double Platinum. As of Feb 23, 2012, the album is triple platinum.

=== Weekly charts ===
Chart (2011–2012)	Peak position
Mexican Album (AMPROFON)	1
US Heatseekers Albums (Billboard)	27
US Top Latin Albums (Billboard)	15
US Latin Pop Albums (Billboard)	4

=== Year-end charts ===
Chart (2011)	Position
Mexican Albums (AMPROFON)	8
Chart (2012)	Position
Mexican Albums (AMPROFON)	5
US Top Latin Albums (Billboard)	60

== Certifications ==
Region	Certification	Certified units/sales
Mexico (AMPROFON)	Diamond+2× Platinum	420,000^{‡}
^{‡} Sales+streaming figures based on certification alone.
