= Vencedor =

Studio album by Valentín Elizalde
- Released: April 18, 2006
- Genres: Banda, ranchera, cumbia, corridos, son (music)
- Label: Universal Latino
- Producer: Valentin Elizalde

Valentín Elizalde chronology
Y su Banda Guasaveña (2006)	Vencedor (2006)	En Vivo, Vol. 2 (2007)

Professional ratings
Review scores
Source	Rating
Allmusic	4/5 stars

Vencedor (Eng.: Victorious) is the title of a studio album released by Mexican norteño performer Valentín Elizalde. This album became his first number-one entry on the Billboard Top Latin Albums, and was released in a standard CD presentation and as a CD/DVD combo.

== Track listing ==
The track listing from Billboard and Allmusic.

=== CD ===
No.	Title	Writer(s)	Length
1.	"Te Quiero Así"	Benny Camacho	2:51
2.	"Vidita Mía"	Chalino Sánchez	3:14
3.	"Como Me Duele"	Manuel Figueroa	3:39
4.	"A Mis Enemigos"	Alejandro Lira	3:03
5.	"El Toro Moro"	Chalino Sánchez	2:25
6.	"Vencedor"	Camacho	3:03
7.	"Y No Me lo Das"	Manuel Figueroa	2:04
8.	"Rodolfillo"	Valentín Elizalde	4:15
9.	"Hoy No"	Valentín Elizalde	2:59
10.	"El Corrido del Médico"	Miguel Ángel Araiza Martínez	4:13
11.	"Por Qué Te Extraño"	Enrique Franco	3:28
12.	"Para Qué Olvidar"	Camacho	3:13
13.	"El "M" Grande"	Juan Villareal	3:01
14.	"En Está Navidad"	Ernesto Pablo Soto	3:58

=== DVD ===
1. Y Se Parece A Ti
2. Si Me Ven
3. Vete Con Él
4. Volveré a Amar
5. Los Pájaros
6. La Más Deseada
7. Aunque Te Enamores
8. Nada
9. Soy Así
10. Ébrio de Amor
11. La Gallina Ponedora
12. Como Me Duele

== Personnel ==
This information from Allmusic.

- Valentin Elizalde — Producer
- Carlos Luna — Mastering, mixing
- Noe Sepulveda — Engineer
- Fortunato Moreno T. — Graphic design, art direction, photography, creative consultant

== Chart performance ==
Chart (2007)	Peak position
Mexico AMPROFON Album Chart	10
US Billboard Top Latin Albums	1
US Billboard Regional Mexican Albums	1
US Billboard Top Heatseekers	35
US Billboard 200	70

Year-End Charts

Chart (2007)	Peak position
US Billboard Top Latin Albums	5
US Billboard Top Regional Mexican Albums	2

== Sales and certifications ==
Region	Certification	Certified units/sales
Mexico (AMPROFON)	4× Platinum	400,000^{^}
United States (RIAA)	Platinum (Latin)	100,000^{^}
^{^} Shipments figures based on certification alone.
