= Valentín Elizalde =

Mexican singer (1979–2006)

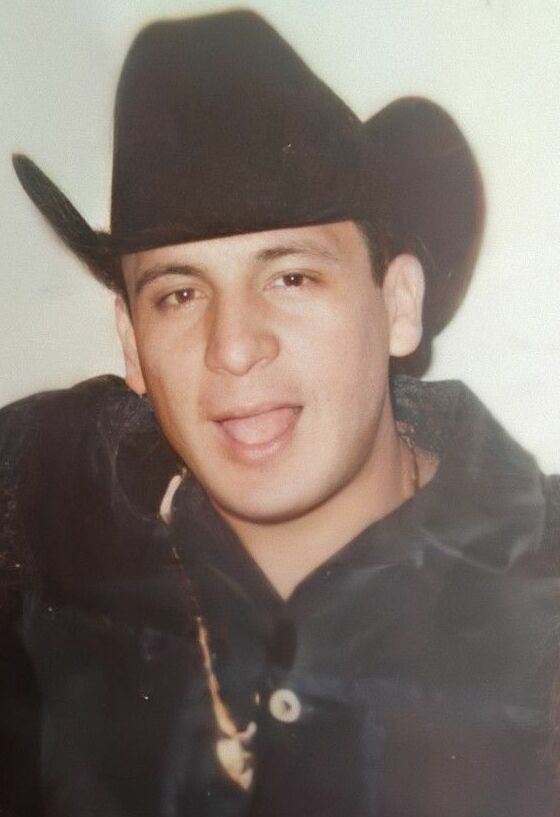
- Elizalde in 2006

Background information
- Also known as: El Gallo de Oro
- Born: Valentín Elizalde Valencia; 1 February 1979; Jitonhueca, Sonora, Mexico
- Died: 25 November 2006 (aged 27) Reynosa, Tamaulipas, Mexico
- Cause of death: Murder (gunshot wounds)
- Genre: Regional Mexican
- Occupation: Singer
- Years active: 1998–2006

Valentín Elizalde Valencia (Spanish: [balenˈtin eliˈsalde βaˈlensja]; 1 February 1979 – 25 November 2006) was a Mexican singer. Nicknamed "El Gallo de Oro" (The Golden Rooster), he specialized in Banda and regional mexican music and was known for his off-key style. His biggest hits included: "Vete Ya," "Ebrio de Amor", and "Soy Así" (a cover of José José's classic song). Some of his songs were narcocorridos, eulogizing Mexican drug lords like Vicente Carrillo Fuentes. He also wrote lyrics honoring Joaquín "El Chapo" Guzmán, leader of the Sinaloa Cartel. He was murdered as he left a concert; allegedly by members of the drug trafficking cartel Los Zetas.

== Life and career ==
Elizalde was born in Jitonhueca, a village near the city of Etchojoa, Sonora. He then moved to Guadalajara, Jalisco, and later to Guasave, Sinaloa, where he, his father, also a singer, Everardo "Lalo" Elizalde, nicknamed "El Gallo" (The Rooster), and brothers resided for a few years. His father died in a car accident on the so-called "Curva de la muerte" (Curve of Death) in Villa Juárez, Sonora.

=== Musical incursion ===
On June 24, 1998, Elizalde performed for the first time as a singer in Bacame Nuevo, Sonora, during a local festival. Under the record label Ayana Musical, in 1999 he released Regresan los mafiosos, his first studio album.

== Murder ==
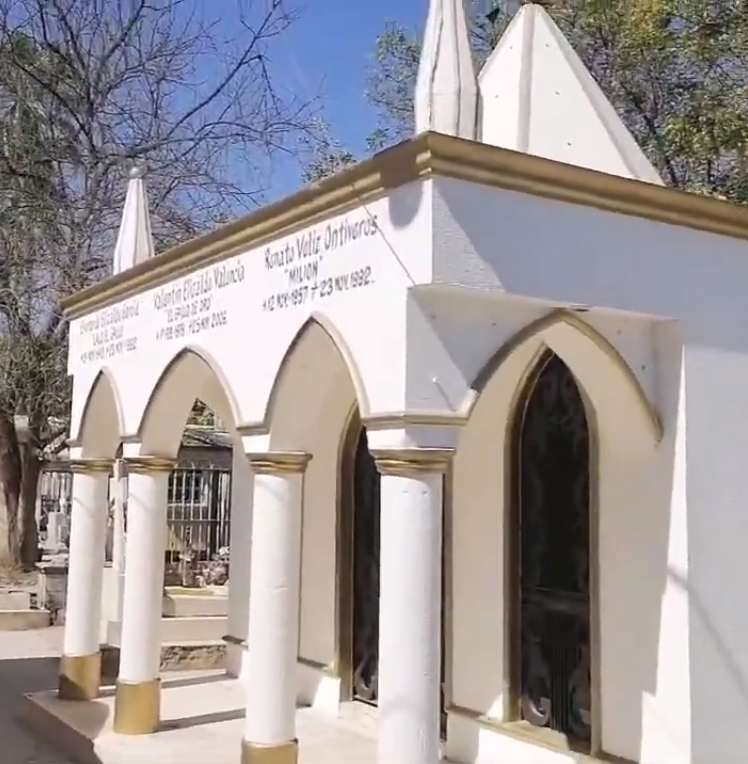
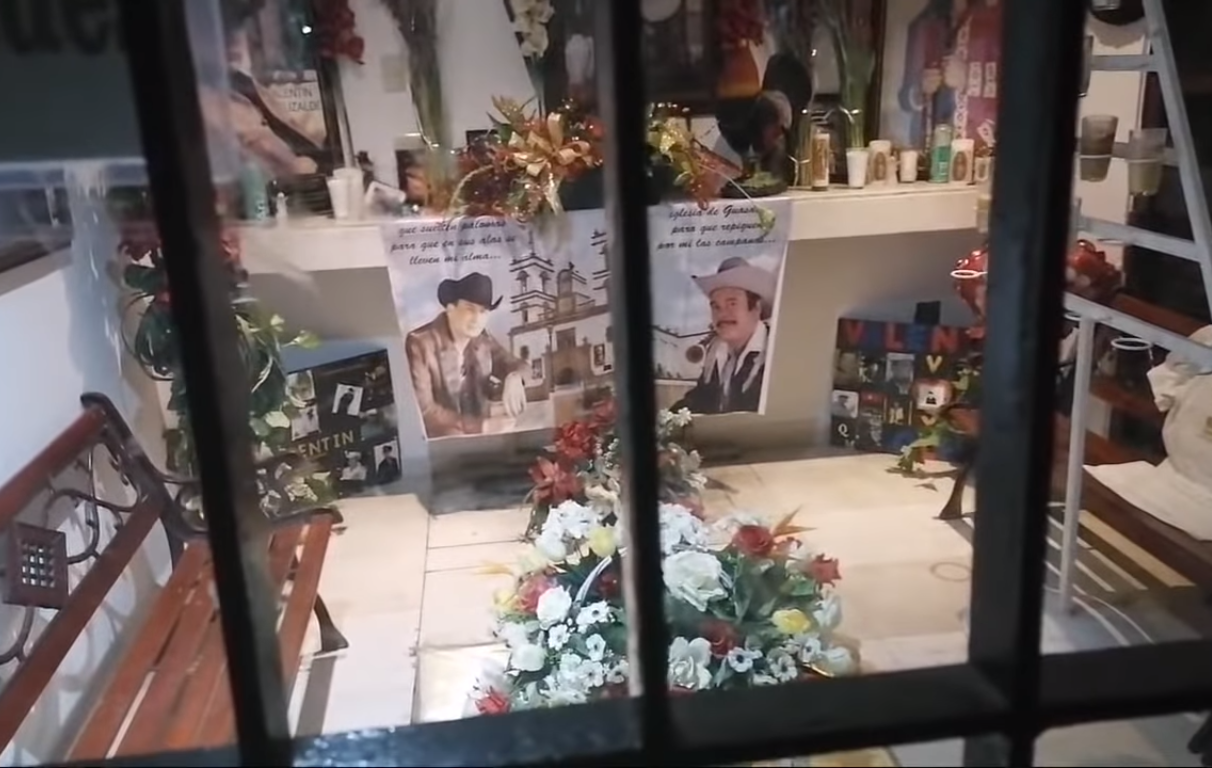
Mausoleum and grave of Elizalde located in the Panteón Municipal de Guasave in Guasave, Sinaloa

On 25 November 2006, Elizalde, aged 27 at the time, was shot twenty times as he entered his SUV shortly after finishing a performance in Reynosa, Tamaulipas. His manager and his driver were also killed. In the incident, Fausto "Tano" Elizalde, his cousin and the only survivor of the attack, was also injured. Two days later, on November 27, his funeral was held in his hometown of Jitonhueca, Sonora, and the following day, his body was buried in a family mausoleum within the Municipal cemetery of Guasave, located in Guasave, Sinaloa. The murders were witnessed by hundreds of fans who were attempting to get autographs. Videos of the murder were also posted on YouTube.

=== Motives ===
It is widely believed that Elizalde was killed for his performances of the corrido, "A Mis Enemigos", which contains lyrics believed to antagonize drug trafficking gang Los Zetas. Raúl Hernández Barrón, alleged murderer of Elizalde and high-ranking member of Los Zetas, was arrested on 22 March 2008 in Coatzintla, Veracruz.

== Legacy ==
While none of his albums reached the top 20 when he was alive, his albums were top sellers in 2007, after his death. In 2007, Elizalde was nominated posthumously for the Grammy Awards in the category of Best Banda Album.

== Family ==
Elizalde's former girlfriend, Blanca Vianey Durán Brambila, was shot in the head and killed in Ciudad Obregón, Sonora, in June 2016. His daughter, Valeria, has aspirations of becoming a singer.

== Discography ==
Albums

- Amor que Muere (1998)
- Regresan los Mafiosos (1999)
- Traición Federal (2000)
- 17 Éxitos en Honor a Mi Padre (2001)
- Y Se Parece a Ti (2002)
- Mi Satisfacción (2003)
- Corridos Entre Amigos (2003)
- Herencia Mexicana (2004)
- Volveré a Amar (2004)
- Soy Así (2005)
- Vencedor (2006)

Posthumous albums

- La Playa (2007)
- Lobo Domesticado (2007)
- Más Allá del Mar (2007)
- 15 Éxitos (2007)
