= La Voz de un Ángel =

La Voz De Un Ángel

Studio album by Yuridia
- Released: December 13, 2005 U.S.
- Genre: Latin, pop
- Length: 38:21
- Label: Sony Music
- Producer: Azteca Music

Yuridia chronology
La Voz De Un Ángel (2005)	Habla El Corazón (2006)

La Voz de un Ángel (Voice of An Angel), is Yuridia's debut album. La Voz de un Ángel was released in 2005, after the finale of La Academia, the Mexican reality show that the artist participated in. The album contains 15 songs interpreted by Yuridia during the series of concerts in the show, in which she was voted second place. The album has had the highest sales for a Mexican album in many years.

== Track listing ==
Latin American release
No.	Title	Length
1.	"Ángel"	4:17
2.	"Ámame"	3:10
3.	"Maldita Primavera"	3:07
4.	"Lo Siento Mi Amor"	4:04
5.	"Peligro"	3:25
6.	"Así fue"	4:57
7.	"Detrás de Mi Ventana"	4:36
8.	"Déjame Volver Contigo"	3:58
9.	"Como Yo Te Amo"	3:56
10.	"Daría"	3:49
11.	"La Muerte del Palomo"	3:27
12.	"Tú"	3:37
13.	"Mi Forma de Ser"	3:20
14.	"Si No Te Hubieras Ido"	4:24
15.	"Mentira"	3:56
16.	"Sobreviviré"	3:35

US release
No.	Title	Length
1.	"Ángel"	4:17
2.	"Ámame"	3:10
3.	"Maldita Primavera"	3:07
4.	"Lo Siento Mi Amor"	4:04
5.	"Peligro"	3:25
6.	"Detrás de Mi Ventana"	4:36
7.	"Déjame Volver Contigo"	3:58
8.	"Mi Forma de Ser"	3:20
9.	"Si No Te Hubieras Ido"	4:24
10.	"Mentira"	3:56

== Singles ==
1. "Ángel"
2. "Maldita Primavera"

== Charts ==
The album was released in October 2005, and quickly rose in the charts. The album debuted at 15 in the Mexican Top 100 albums, and in a few weeks was at the top of the chart. La Voz de un Ángel stayed at number 1 for more than 3 months and is still in the Top 20 Mexican albums.

The first single from the album was a Spanish cover of Robbie Williams' song "Ángel", which became the album's biggest hit. As of May 2009, the album was still inside the Top 100 Mexican albums, totaling more than 125 weeks.

Chart (2005)	Peak position
US Heatseekers Albums (Billboard)	17
US Top Latin Albums (Billboard)	16
US Latin Pop Albums (Billboard)	8

== Sales and certifications ==
Region	Certification	Certified units/sales
Mexico (AMPROFON)	2× Diamond+4× Platinum+Gold	1,450,000^{‡}
United States (RIAA)	Platinum (Latin)	100,000^{^}
^{^} Shipments figures based on certification alone.^{‡} Sales+streaming figures based on certification alone.
