= Yuridia =

Mexican singer

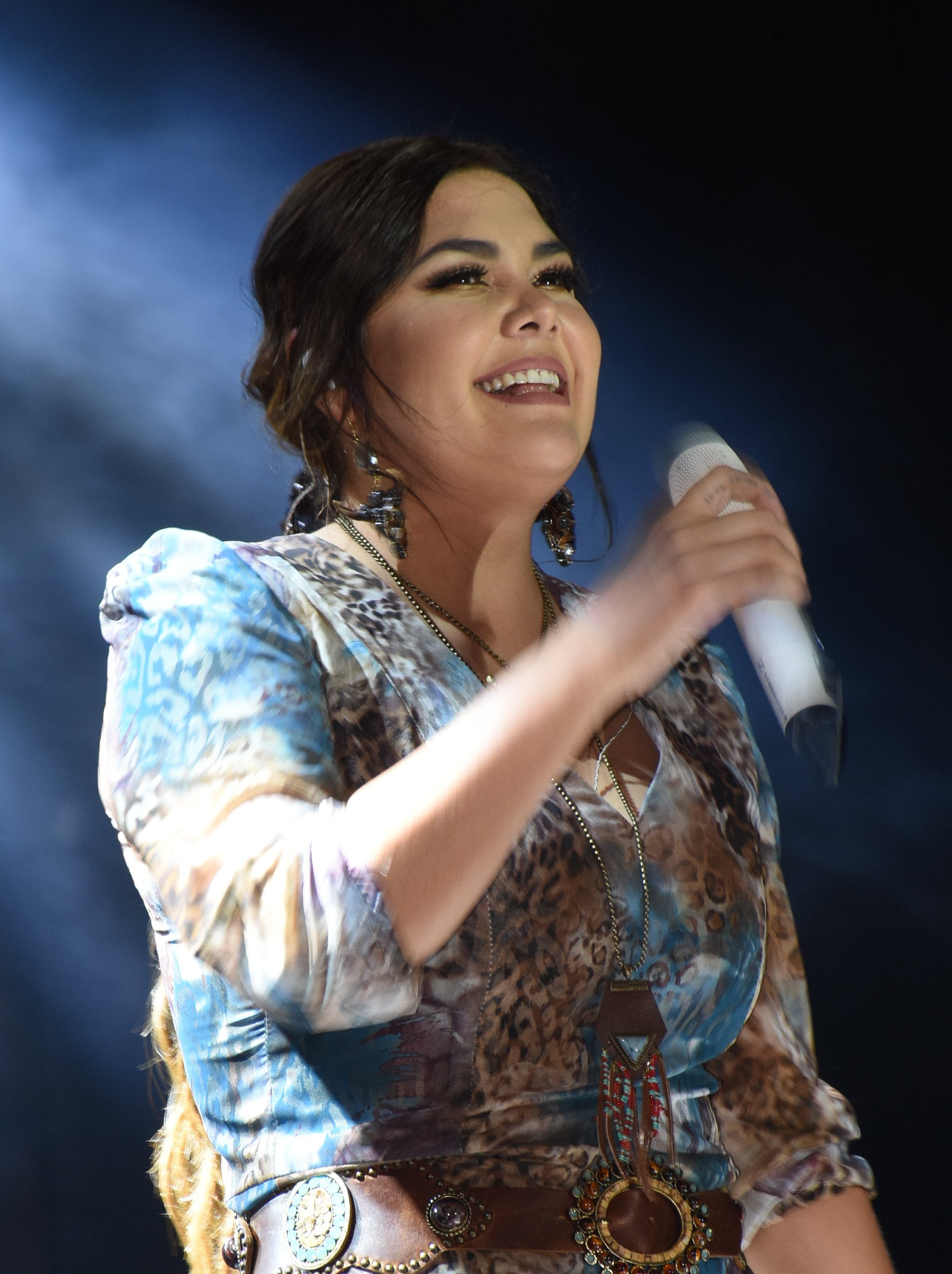
- Yuridia in 2018
- Born: Yuridia Francisca Gaxiola Flores; 4 October 1986 (age 40); Hermosillo, Sonora, Mexico
- Other names: Yuri; La Voz de Ángel
- Occupation: Singer
- Years active: 2005–present
- Spouse: Matías Aranda (m. 2019)
- Children: 3
- Musical career
- Genres: Latin pop, indie pop, regional Mexican
- Instrument: Vocals
- Label: Sony Music Latin
- Website: www.yuritaflowers.com

Yuridia Francisca Gaxiola Flores (born 4 October 1986), known mononymously as Yuridia, is a Mexican singer. She came in second place in the fourth season of the reality show La Academia, which launched her career. She is considered as one of the most successful and most listened-to Mexican artists on digital platforms.

In 2005, Yuridia released her debut album La Voz de un Ángel. It became the second best-selling album in 2006 and one of the fastest-selling albums of all time in Mexico. It has been certified Diamond since its release. Her second album, Habla El Corazón was certified Platinum in Mexico after a few weeks of release. Entre Mariposas, Yuridia's third album with original songs, was released in late 2007. It was certified gold selling more than 50,000 copies within the first week of being released, peaking at number one position in the top selling charts.

== Career ==
Yuridia won second place in the fourth season of La Academia, a popular Mexican reality show. Yuridia is the highest selling artist to come out of the reality show and most popular to this date. At age 19, Yuridia had become one of the highest selling artists in Mexico. Her debut album sold over 1,500,000 copies, which makes Yuridia the highest selling female artist in the country since Thalía in the 1990s, and beating out artists such as Luis Miguel, and Juan Gabriel. Her voice has earned her the nickname Voz de un Ángel (Voice of an Angel), leading to her debut album's title La Voz de un Ángel. This album has been certified 2× Diamond and 3× Platinum + Gold.

On December 5, 2006, Sony BMG released Yuridia's second album, Habla El Corazón, as well as the first single "Como Yo Nadie Te Ha Amado", a cover of the Spanish version of Bon Jovi's "This Ain't a Love Song". The second and last single was Yuridia's cover for Roxette's Listen to Your Heart Spanish cover, Habla El Corazon. The album includes Spanish covers of well-known songs from artists such as Bonnie Tyler and The Police. The album sold 660,000 copies worldwide, and was certified 3× Platinum + Gold.

To this date, both the album and the single are Yuridia's most successful in the United States. The album debuted at 15 and peaked at #14, while the single peaked on Billboard's Hot Latin Tracks chart at 16. Her second single has managed to do what her previous second single did not, enter the HLT chart and has peaked at number 44.

Yuridia's third solo album, Entre Mariposas, was released on November 15, 2007, in Mexico. The first single from the album was "Ahora Entendí", written by her and Camila's Mario Domm. The following single is Yo Por El. It peaked at #1 in Mexico and in Central America. The third and last single is En Su Lugar, it debuted at #16, finally topping the #4 spot. The album, produced by Javier Calderón, quickly garnered major sales and has already been certified Gold for selling 50,000 copies within the first day of its release. It has also been certified 4× Platinum + Gold for a total of 650,000 copies worldwide.

She has been nominated for awards such as, Latin Grammy, Premios Juventud Latin Billboard OYE awards and Lo Nuestro music awards.

On April 26, 2007, Yuridia won a Latin Billboard Award for Best Pop Female Album.

In early May 2007, Yuridia also received four nominations for the Premios Juventud. She was nominated for Best Artist, Best Album, Catchiest Song and Most Heart-Breaking Song.

By the end of 2008, Yuridia won a Premios Oye award as the best Female Artist of the year.

In 2009 she also had three nominations for (Lo nuestro Music awards) "Best Artist", "Best Album" (Entre Mariposas), and "Catchiest Song"(Ahora entendi).

On September 30, 2009, she released her fourth studio album, Nada es Color de Rosa. This album has sold 120,000 copies.

In 2016, through a statement, announced her entry to Televisa, after belonging to TV Azteca for 9 years, having participated in the singing reality La Academia.

On April 27, 2022, it was announced they Yuridia would return to TV Azteca, but this time as a coach of La Voz... México alongside Ha*Ash, David Bisbal and Joss Favela. A contestant on her team, Fátima Elizondo won the competition on August 29, 2022, making Yuridia the winning coach.

== Personal life ==
Yuridia was born in Hermosillo, Sonora, but grew up in Mesa, Arizona. She considers Mesa to be her hometown. She is the oldest of five. She had two brothers and two sisters, but her younger brother Danny suffered from muscular dystrophy. He died in Mesa at age 15 in December 2005. The death of her brother had a major impact on her life. She left Mesa High School during her senior year to be on La Academia.

Yuridia was romantically involved with Edgar Guerrero, whom she met on La Academia. The two have a son, Phoenix (named after actor Joaquin Phoenix), who also aspires becoming a singer. He released his first single in 2022 at the age of 13.

In December 2019, Yuridia confirmed she had married her longtime boyfriend and still-manager, Argentinian Matías Aranda, whom she had been dating for approximately seven years. The wedding was very private and took place in Tepoztlán, Morelos. On July 13, 2023, she gave birth to her second child but first with Aranda, whom they named Benicio. In July 2025, Yuridia gave birth to her third child, Noah Valentin Aranda Gaxiola.

== Awards ==
- 23 Gold albums in Mexico, 3 Gold albums in the United States
- 4 Gold albums in Central America for her first two albums
- 3 Gold albums in Mexico for legal downloads of her singles "Ángel" and "Como Yo Nadie Te Ha Amado" on Master Ringtone
- 18 Platinum albums in Mexico, 2 Platinum albums in the United States
- 2 Diamond albums, making her the only female artist in 15 years to do so in Mexico
- Premio Oye! 2006 Top 100 en Ventas
- Premio Billboard 2007 Album Pop Nueva Generación Con La Voz De Un Ángel
- Premio Oye! 2008 Solista Femenina del Año
- On the last generation's debut concert, she received 22 Gold albums and 1 Diamond for high sales of all three of her albums
- Three-time winner of 2024's Premio Lo Nuestro 2024 as Female Regional Mexican Artist of the Year, Banda Song of the Year and Mariachi/Ranchera Song of the Year

== Discography ==
- La Voz de un Ángel (2005)
- Habla El Corazón (2006)
- Entre Mariposas (2007)
- Nada es Color de Rosa (2009)
- Para Mí (2011)
- 6 (2015)
- Primera Fila: En Vivo (2017)
- Pa' Luego Es Tarde (2022)
- Sin Llorar (2025)

Awards and achievements
Preceded by Reyli for En La Luna	Latin Billboard Award for Latin Pop Album of the Year, New Artist; 2007	Succeeded by Kany García for Cualquier Día
