= Reyli =

Mexican singer

Reyli Barba
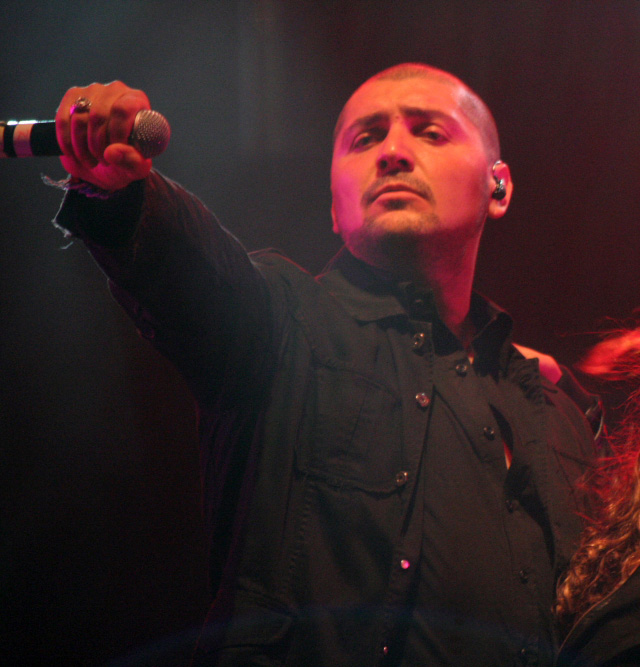

Background information
- Born: Reyli Barba; April 12, 1972 (age 54)
- Origin: Juárez, Chiapas, Mexico
- Genres: Latin pop, Latin rock
- Occupation: Singer-songwriter
- Years active: 1989—present

Reyli Barba (born April 12, 1972), most commonly known mononymously as Reyli, is a Mexican singer-songwriter. He is also a composer and has written songs for artists such as Alejandro Fernández and Beyoncé Knowles.

Reyli is a former member of Elefante, a band which he led until 2003, when he set out to release his debut solo album. This album, titled En la Luna (On the Moon), sold well, and "Amor Del Bueno" reached the top of the Mexican charts, charted in the U.S. Hot Latin Tracks and became a global Latin hit.

== Career ==
=== Elefante ===
Elefante had formed in Mexico in the late nineties, but they only became successful in the early 2000s, when they opened for Joaquín Sabina in the Auditorio Nacional, Mexico's most important arena. Their debut album, El Que Busca Encuentra was a success. The first single was Así Es La Vida which reached the Mexican Top 5 due to its staggering radio airplay.

The band would go on to release Lo Que Andábamos Buscando, their second album in 2001 which spawned their greatest hit, "El Abandonao" which was sung by Reyli. During this time, the band would represent Mexico in the famous Chilean festival Viña del Mar International Song Festival.

In 2003, Reyli announced that he had plans to release a solo album, and that he was to stay in Elefante. After the announcement, however, he left the band. No announcement was ever given to the Mexican media.

=== En la Luna ===
After leaving the band, Reyli started composing for what he planned to be his solo debut, a romantic pop very different from the Rock Latino he sang in Elefante. En la Luna was released on September 28, 2004.

The first single from the album was Desde Que Llegaste which was used in the soundtrack for the movie Ladies' Night. Radio airplay and the high rotation of the music video, which featured now-Hollywood actress Ana de la Reguera, helped the single climb up the charts. Ten weeks after its release, the song had climbed to the top of the Mexican charts and stayed there for a second week. The single also charted in the U.S. Latin Top 30.

The second single from the album, "Al Fin Me Arme de Valor" was largely a flop. The song failed to chart on the U.S. Hot Latin Tracks.

In 2005, Reyli released "Amor del Bueno", which was to be the defining third single. The song was welcomed warmly by radio stations, which put the song on high rotation. The song charted as high as 11 in the U.S. Hot Latin Tracks.

During this time, Reyli's "La Descarada" was also the theme song for the extremely successful telenovela Rubí, which was broadcast in the United States, Mexico, and all over Latin America.

Two more songs were released from the album, "No Era Necesario", which peaked within the Mexican Top 20 and "Se Quien Soy" which was the official song to the Mexican version of Big Brother.

In Mexico, the album was certified 2 times Platinum and Gold, for 250,000 albums sold, while it was certified 2 times Gold in the U.S. for sales of 200,000. To date, it has sold 500,000 copies in the world.

On February 26, 2006, En la Luna, Special Edition was released. Almost a year and half after the original release of En la Luna, Reyli included the full studio version of "No Era Necesario", since the original album only featured a demo version. Also, a reggaetón version of "Al Fin Me Armé de Valor" was included as the final track. In addition to the 2 extra tracks, there was an accompanying DVD with video clips and footage from live performance.

=== Fe ===
In mid-2007, Reyli released his expected second album, Fe (Faith). He recorded a song called "Aunque vivas con el" with the Mexican legend José José, for Jose's last album Mis Duetos.

Reyli has released 2 singles from the album to date. Pegale A La Pared and Perdoname En Silencio.

=== Que Vueltas da la vida ===
Released digitally on May 12, 2009, Que Vueltas da la vida was available to the general public on June 9, 2009. Of his third studio effort, the singer-songwriter said, "This album will make history in my career and in my life." He went on to say that the album, "carries my happiness, my longings, it reflects my status today, my way of being now, my sentimental state, my stage in life." The album was produced and directed by Andrés Castro, who has worked with the likes of Carlos Vives and Juanes. "This marvelous album, Que vueltas da la vida, we wrote it, assembled it, gave it strength, Andrés and I; Andrés is Colombian, a producer, a guitarist, my adored brother. We started in September, in one afternoon we wrote six songs and from there he started to put everything together, the answers were very clear that the unedited album had to be assembled and eleven days later, we had the repertory pulled together."

The album is a reflection of Reyli's love for experimentation. The 11-track album showcases ballads and songs of rock music and ranchera influence. He admitted that the album "sounds harder and more-street." In it, "I show a little bit more of myself as an artist, as a composer. It is a more direct disc, a mouthful of truths, a special expression of life's contrasts, with songs very rough, but also songs "full of honey, of purity, like Ando por las nubes (I walk through clouds), Alma gemela (Soulmate), Cásate conmigo (Marry me); there is everything on the CD."

On September 12, 2009, Mario Domm (of Camila) presented Reyli with the Gold Disc, for having sold more than 50,000 copies of Que Vueltas da la vida.

Two singles have been released to date, "¿Qué nos pasó?" and "La verdad". The video of "¿Qué nos pasó?" was filmed in San Luis Potosí under the direction of Andrés Ibáñez de Infante. Working with director Matias Penachino and producer Paula Marina Arriola and cinematography of Agustin Calderon AMC, Reyli filmed the video for "La verdad", the second single. It was shot on site at Hotel Geneve, in Mexico City.

== Personal life ==
Reyli Barba dated Sandra Echeverría from 2010 - 2011.

In 2012, Reyli Barba was revealed as being the father of Ana Bárbara's third son, Jeronimo.

=== Arrest ===
On Friday, September 6, 2013, Reyli was arrested in Mexicali for disorderly conduct, while intoxicated outside of a convenience store after being reported by bystanders for smoking a suspicious substance inside a parked car.

He reportedly resisted arrest and several pictures of his were circulated in social media. He was then transferred to a rehabilitation center to deal with drug addiction.

== Discography ==
- En la Luna (2004)
- Fe (2007)
- Que Vueltas da la vida (2009)
- Bien Acompañado (2011)
- La Metamorfosis (2019)
- Contigo Quiero (2023)
- A Caballo (2026)
