= 20 Años de Éxitos En Vivo con Moderatto =

Live album by Alejandra Guzmán
- Released: June 21, 2011
- Recorded: March 17, 2011, at Palacio de los Deportes in Mexico City
- Genres: Latin pop, rock en Español
- Length: 79:36
- Label: EMI
- Producer: Jay de la Cueva

Alejandra Guzmán chronology
Único (2009)	20 Años de Éxitos En Vivo con Moderatto (2011)	La Guzmán: Primera Fila (2013)

Singles from 20 Años de Éxitos En Vivo con Moderatto
- 1. "Día de Suerte" Released: February 2010; 2. "Un Grito en la Noche" Released: September 2011; 3. "Llama Por Favor" Released: February 2012

20 Años de Éxitos En Vivo con Moderatto (20 Years of Hits Live with Moderatto) is the third live album by Mexican recording artist Alejandra Guzmán. It was released by EMI Latin on June 21, 2011, and features the participation of Moderatto as her backing band. Jay de la Cueva worked as producer of the album, which was recorded at the Palacio de los Deportes in Mexico City on March 17, 2011. The album includes Guzmán's greatest hits, a song originally performed by Moderatto, and two newly recorded songs, including the theme song of the Mexican telenovela Una familia con suerte.

The album entered the top five in Mexico and the top twenty in the United States. To promote the album, a video for the song "Un Grito en la Noche", previously a single from Guzmán's album Eternamente Bella (1990), was released in September 2011. The standard edition of the album in Mexico includes a DVD documentary about the recording sessions. 20 Años de Éxitos En Vivo con Moderatto received a platinum+gold certification in Mexico by the Asociación Mexicana de Productores de Fonogramas y Videogramas and garnered four nominations for the Premios Oye!, including Album of the Year.

== Background ==
To commemorate 20 years of musical career, Alejandra Guzmán decided to record a live album at the Palacio de los Deportes in Mexico City. Guzmán asked Jay de la Cueva to produce the album and include his band Moderatto in the show. About the recording, Guzmán said that the main reason is to have a more produced show to perform songs of the bad and good things that have happened to her, "it's been many years, we want to make them [the public] happy." The album was recorded after Guzmán's featured performance on the album En Primera Fila by Venezuelan singer-songwriter Franco De Vita, with the song "Tan Sólo Tú", which resulted in two nominations for the Latin Grammy Awards of 2011: Record of the Year and Best Long Form Music Video. The album is Guzmán's third live album following La Guzmán (1998) and Alejandra Guzmán En Vivo (2003).

== Repertoire ==
Ten songs previously recorded by the singer are included: "Llama Por Favor", "Un Grito en la Noche" and the title track from her album Eternamente Bella of 1990. "Hacer El Amor Con Otro" and "Güera" are taken from Flor de Papel (1991). "Mala Hierba" and "Mírala, Míralo" were first included on Libre in 1993. "De Verdad" was the lead single from Soy (2001). "Volverte a Amar" from Indeleble in 2006. "Verano Peligroso" is the theme song of a film starred by Guzmán in 1991, and was first included on her compilation album Lo Más Prendido. The album is the first to feature the song "Día de Suerte", the theme song of the Mexican telenovela Una familia con suerte. "Ya Lo Veía Venir" was the first single from Moderatto's 2008 album Queremos Rock. "No Te Lo Tomes Personal" is a new song written by Jay de la Cueva and Guzmán.

== Recording and release ==
20 Años de Éxitos En Vivo con Moderatto was recorded on March 17, 2011, at Palacio de los Deportes in Mexico City. Guzmán was joined on stage by the Mexican band Moderatto, where they performed before a selected audience of fans. American singer Jenni Rivera accompanied the singer on the song "Eternamente Bella", while Puerto-Rican performer Vico C joined them on "Mala Hierba". Guzmán also presented the song "Día de Suerte" for the first time. Guzmán declared on her experience working with Moderatto: "On stage, when I'm with them, everything is magic. Right now I feel part of the band because it made me feel very happy and made me feel like their songs are mine." A long form music video was recorded and included on the standard Mexican edition of the album as an accompanying DVD. This music video opened in several movie theaters in the United States and Mexico, and tickets were available for free to her fans on her official website.

== Track listing ==
No.	Title	Writer(s)	Length
1.	"Verano Peligroso"	J.R. Florez, César Valle	5:07
2.	"Mírala, Míralo"	Marella Cayre, DiFelisatti, Florez	4:11
3.	"No Te Lo Tomes Personal"	Jay de la Cueva, Alejandra Guzmán	3:40
4.	"Llama Por Favor"	DiFelisatti, Florez	5:40
5.	"Volverte A Amar"	Mario Domm, Guzmán	5:41
6.	"Hacer Él Amor Con Otro"	Consuelo Arango, Cayre	7:55
7.	"Ya Lo Veía Venir"	Acevedo, Azpiazu, De La Cueva	3:43
8.	"Hey Güera"	Arango, Cayre	5:56
9.	"Mala Hierba" (Featuring Vico C)	Valle, Marina Lima, Cesar Sánchez	3:27
10.	"De Verdad"	Julia Sierra, Jodi Marr, Steve Mandile	4:30
11.	"Día De Suerte"	José Luis Ortega, Guzmán	4:01
12.	"Eternamente Bella" (Featuring Jenni Rivera)	DiFelisatti, Florez	3:14
13.	"Un Grito En La Noche"	Arango	3:45
14.	"Día De Suerte (Studio Version)"	Ortega, Guzmán	3:34

iTunes deluxe edition bonus track
No.	Title	Writer(s)	Length
15.	"Soy Sólo Un Secreto"	José Luis Pagán, Guzmán	4:17

Deluxe edition bonus DVD
No.	Title	Length
1.	"Verano Peligroso"	5:07
2.	"Mírala, Míralo"	4:11
3.	"No Te Lo Tomes Personal"	3:40
4.	"Llama Por Favor"	5:40
5.	"Volverte A Amar"	5:41
6.	"Hacer Él Amor Con Otro"	7:55
7.	"Ya Lo Veía Venir"	3:43
8.	"Hey Güera"	5:56
9.	"Mala Hierba" (Featuring Vico C)	3:27
10.	"De Verdad"	4:30
11.	"Día De Suerte"	4:01
12.	"Eternamente Bella" (Featuring Jenni Rivera)	3:14
13.	"Un Grito Un La Noche"	3:45
14.	"Documentary"	13:28

== Singles ==
#	Title
1.	"Un Grito en la noche"
2.	"Dia de Suerte"
3.	"Llama por favor"

== Accolades ==
Guzmán received four nominations for the Premios Oye! for her work on the album, including Album of the Year and Female Pop Album, winning the latter. 20 Años de Éxitos also earned a nomination for Rock Album of the Year at the Premio Lo Nuestro 2012.

== Charts and certifications ==
The album debuted at number 15 and peaked at number two on the Mexican Albums Chart, being blocked for the number-one by MTV Unplugged by Mexican band Los Tigres del Norte. The album is the highest placement in the chart for Guzmán since Indeleble which peaked at the top in 2006. 20 Años de Éxitos En Vivo con Moderatto earned a platinum certificacion in Mexico by the Asociación Mexicana de Productores de Fonogramas y Videogramas. In the United States, the album debuted and peaked at number 20 in the Billboard Latin Albums and at number seven on the Latin Pop Albums chart, becoming Guzmán's fourth top ten album in the latter chart, following Flor de Papel (1992), Soy (2001) and Reina de Corazones: La Historia (2007).

=== Weekly charts ===
Chart (2011)	Peak position
Mexican Albums Chart (AMPROFON)	2
U.S. Billboard Top Latin Albums	20
U.S. Billboard Latin Pop Albums	7

=== Year-end charts ===
Chart (2011)	Position
Mexican Albums Chart	10

=== Album certifications ===
Region	Certification	Certified units/sales
Mexico (AMPROFON)	Platinum+Gold	90,000^{^}
^{^} Shipments figures based on certification alone.

== Personnel ==
- Alejandra Guzmán – vocals
- Bryan Amadeus – vocals, piano, guitars
- Xavi Moderatto – bass guitar
- Mick Marcy – guitar, vocals
- Roy – guitar, vocals
- Elohim Corona – drums
- Jose Portilla – guitar
- Gustavo Borner – recording engineer and mixing
- Juan Luis Falluca – recording engineer
- Toni Francois – photography
- Karola, Micro and Guille – graphic design
