= A + No Poder =

2015 studio album by Alejandra Guzmán

Studio album by Alejandra Guzmán
- Released: September 11, 2015
- Studios: Gorilla's Nest (Nashville); Hoke's Hell-Hole of Harmony (Nashville); South Beach Studios (Miami); SpeakEasy (Hollywood); The Playground Studios (Nashville); Ultra Pop Music Studios (Miami)
- Genre: Latin rock
- Length: 39:59
- Language: Spanish
- Labels: RCA; Sony Latin
- Producers: Alejandra Guzmán, José Luis Pagán

Alejandra Guzmán chronology
Primera Fila (2013)	A + No Poder (2015)	Versus (2017)

Singles from A + No Poder
- 1. "Adiós" Released: June 5, 2015; 2. "Que Ironía" Released: September 12, 2015; 3. "Esta Noche" Released: May 27, 2016

A + No Poder (English: "To the Max") is the fourteenth studio album by Mexican recording artist Alejandra Guzmán. It was released on September 11, 2015, by RCA and Sony Music Latin. It is also her first album with the label since Indeleble (2006). After the success of her previous live album, Primera Fila (2013) and its promotional tour, Guzmán recorded the album with original songs, composed and produced by her and Argentinian musician José Luis Pagán.

After its release, A + No Poder received favorable reviews from music critics, with one expressing appreciation for the balance between ballads and rock songs. The record peaked at number twelve on the US Billboard Latin Pop Albums and number six in Mexico. To promote the album, three singles were released: "Adiós" featuring reggaeton performer Farruko, which peaked at number 26 on the Billboard Latin Pop Songs chart, "Qué Ironía" and "Esta Noche".

== Background ==
In 2013, Alejandra Guzmán released her fourth live album titled Primera Fila, selling 90,000 units in Mexico and launching the "La Guzman 1F Tour", which included dates in cities of the United States such as Los Angeles, Las Vegas, Houston, Miami and also Puerto Rico. Two years later, Guzmán entered the recording studio to record A + No Poder, which would become her first studio album in over five years. The album's songs were written by Guzmán and Argentinian musician José Luis Pagán. The singer stated that the album "reflects maturity and growth that has also regains my rock essence since I was pigeonholed as a balladeer but not at all, that is what I am." A + No Poder is Guzmán's first studio album since Único (2009), a critically acclaimed effort that was commercial unsuccessful due to lack of promotion, according to Ángel Rodríguez of ADN Informativo.

== Content ==
A + No Poder is dedicated to Guzmán's daughter Frida Sofia. The album includes twelve tracks: eleven written by Guzmán and Pagán, with additional writers for three of them. "Adiós" was co-written by Carlos Efrén Reyes, "Esta Noche" was co-written by Karenka and Reyli Barba, and "A Más No Poder" was co-written Sarah Lenore. Another track, "Una Canción de Amor", was entirely written by Argentinean singer-songwriter Alejandro Lerner. "Adiós" features Puerto-Rican reggaeton performer Farruko. "Te Esperaré" is a ballad, and "Malvada", a story about a femme fatale, has country music undertones with a harmonica that resembles Mexican band El Tri. "Malvada" and "This is Too Much Rock and Roll" are rock songs, with the latter reminds of Soy, an album released by the singer in 2001. "Esta Noche" is a pop/funk track with reggae influences. "A Más No Poder" has sexual connotations in its lyrics and as stated by Ángel Rodríguez of ADN Informativo, "brings back memories when Guzmán was produced by Miguel Blasco in the 90's". "Mi Debilidad" is a pop/rock song, while "No Puedo Parar" is a heavy metal track. "Qué Ironía" is a rock ballad that recalls Guzmán greatest hits such as "Mi Peor Error". About the songs included, Guzmán stated to Tabasco Hoy: "In recent years I experienced many good and bad things, so I thought, why not transform them into songs. And so it began to take shape this new album, which I think is more intelligent, mature and planned than my previous work".

== Reception ==
=== Critical reception ===
Professional ratings
Review scores
Source	Rating
ADN Informativo	favorable
Hey Espectáculos	81/100
Televisa Espectáculos	favorable

The album was met with positive reviews by music critics. Fabiola Hinojosa, of Televisa Espectáculos stated that the album "shows that despite being a rocker at heart, she has no problem recording in another genre and experiment[ing] with new rhythms." Hinojosa also praised the rock song "No Puedo Parar", arguing that "if someone who never before had heard another song from her would believe that she [Guzmán] only performs in the rock genre". Ángel Rodríguez of ADN Informativo said that "Guzmán is back and wants to reclaim her place on the music market." Rodríguez also reminded that Guzmán keeps trying to incorporate new or alternative rhythms to her music even if the results are not commercially successful, such as her albums Cambio de Piel (1996) produced by Spanish musician Carlos Narea, or Lipstick (2004), helmed by American artist Desmond Child, and A + No Poder is no exception, since the "Queen of Rock in Mexico" includes songs that "hark back to the era of the nineties, but so potentiated with harder songs where the guitars, drums and her hoarse voice come together in musical chords." Alex Alexdy of Hey Espectáculos referred to this album as a "well balance between rock and pop" that shows Guzmán's excentric side who opted for a rock album with some ballads and new rhythms such as reggaeton.

=== Commercial reception ===
A + No Poder peaked at number 12 in the Billboard Latin Pop Albums component chart in the United States, one of her worst placements in the chart, only Lipstick (2004) and Fuerza (2007) have reached lower numbers, at 15 and 16, respectively. In Mexico, the album peaked at number six in the Mexican Albums Chart.

== Singles ==
To promote the album, Guzmán released three singles. Lead single "Adiós" was released on June 5, 2015, and features guest vocals from Farruko. The track peaked at number 26 in the Billboard Latin Pop Songs and 17 in the Latin Rhythm Airplay charts, respectively, in the United States and at 15 on the Mexican Espanol Airplay chart. According to Alex Alexdy of Hey Espectáculos, the song was not a success since it is not good enough to compete with other 'reggaeton' songs and "it is far from the ballads that are surefire hits for Guzmán." The music video for the second single, "Qué Ironía", was filmed on Iceland and released on September 12, 2015. To further promote the album, the track "Esta Noche" was used as the main theme of the Mexican TV show Parodiando: Noches de Traje, and was later released as the third single on May 27, 2016, with a music video filmed on Campeche, Mexico.

== Track listing ==
A + No Poder – Standard edition
No.	Title	Writer(s)	Length
1.	"Te Esperaré"	Alejandra Guzmán; José Luis Pagán	3:24
2.	"Malvada"	Guzmán; Pagán	3:21
3.	"Adiós" (Featuring Farruko)	Guzmán; Pagán; Carlos Efrén Reyes	3:17
4.	"Qué Ironía"	Guzmán; Pagán	3:42
5.	"This Is Too Much Rock And Roll"	Guzmán; Pagán	2:34
6.	"Esta Noche"	Guzmán; Karenka; Reyli Barba	3:07
7.	"Agua Bendita"	Guzmán; Pagán	3:31
8.	"Mi Debilidad"	Guzmán; Pagán	3:42
9.	"A Más No Poder"	Guzmán; Pagán; Sarah Lenore	3:13
10.	"Una Canción De Amor"	Alejandro Lerner	3:47
11.	"No Puedo Parar"	Guzmán; Pagán	3:06
12.	"Lejos De Ti"	Guzmán; Pagán	3:27

== Credits ==
Credits adapted from AllMusic.

- Robert Arthur – acoustic guitar
- Gustavo Borner – mastering, mixing
- Pat Coil – Hammond organ
- Farruko – featured artist
- Manny Galvez – assistant engineer
- Alejandra Guzmán – direction, primary artist, realization
- Brendan Harkin – recording
- Jim Hoke – harmonica
- Chris Latham – recording
- Matt Laug – drums
- Sarah Lenore – background vocals
- Guillermo Gutiérrez Leyva – A&R
- Chris McDonald – string arrangements
- Teddy Mulet – trombone, trumpet
- Craig Nelson – upright bass
- Quique Ollervides – artist, design
- Azucena Olvera – A&R
- José Luis Pagán – arrangement, bass, background vocals, direction, acoustic guitar, electric guitar, keyboard programming, production, recording, string arrangements
- Saverio Principini – bass guitar, recording
- Gabriel Saientz – piano
- Doug Sarrett – recording
- Marco Sonzini – recording
- Sharo Torres – keyboards, recording, rhythm programming
- Kameron Williams – MC

== Charts ==
=== Weekly charts ===
Chart (2015)	Peak position
Mexican Albums Chart (AMPROFON)	6
US Latin Pop Albums (Billboard)	12

=== Year-end charts ===
Chart (2015)	Position
Mexican Albums Chart	93
