= Reina de Corazones (album) =

Reina de Corazones • La Historia

Compilation album by Alejandra Guzmán
- Released: July 31, 2007
- Genre: Latin pop, Rock, Rock en Español
- Label: Sony BMG
- Producer: Desmond Child, Loris Ceroni, Miguel Blasco, Juan Carlos Calderón, Oscar López

Alejandra Guzmán chronology
Canciones de Amor (2006)	Reina de Corazones • La Historia (2007)	Fuerza (2007)

Reina de Corazones: La Historia is a compilation album from Mexican singer Alejandra Guzmán. It was released on July 31, 2007. The album includes singles from the beginnings of Guzman's career on Melody and Sony BMG from eight of her albums (no tracks from Bye Mama, Dame tu Amor, Enorme and La Guzmán were included).

A CD/DVD edition was also released including six videos. This DVD is also available on its own.

The title of this album came from the signature song of Alejandra Guzmán of the same title.

This compilation peaked at #22 on the Billboard Top Latin Albums and #14 in the Top Heatseekers album chart.

The cover photography was taken from the sessions for her album Cambio de Piel and was taken by Alejandro Cabrera.

== Track listing (CD/DVD) ==
CD Track listing

1. Eternamente Bella — 3:27
2. Reina de Corazones — 3:27
3. Mala Hierba — 3:20
4. Mírala, Míralo — 4:03
5. Toda la Mitad — 3:48
6. Enemigos — 3:59
7. Diablo — 3:27
8. De Verdad — 3:20
9. Lipstick — 3:13
10. Tu Eres Mi Luz — 3:09
11. Volverte a Amar — 3:42
12. Quiero Estar Contigo — 3:36

DVD Track listing

1. Mala Hierba
2. Mírala, Miralo
3. Diablo
4. Lipstick
5. Volverte a Amar
6. Quiero Estar Contigo

== Track listing (CD) ==
1. Hacer el Amor con Otro — 4:40
2. Eternamente Bella — 3:27
3. Reina de Corazones — 3:27
4. Mala Hierba — 3:20
5. Mirala, Miralo — 4:03
6. Libre — 4:13
7. Ven — 4:11
8. Toda la Mitad — 3:48
9. Algo Natural — 3:59
10. Diablo — 3:27
11. De Verdad — 3:20
12. Volveré a Amar — 3:53
13. Lipstick — 3:13
14. Tu Eres Mi Luz — 3:09
15. Volverte a Amar — 3:42
16. Quiero Estar Contigo — 3:36
