= La Voz (Mexican TV series) season 4 =

La Voz
- Season 4
- Hosted by: Jacqueline Bracamontes; Paty Cantu
- Coaches: Ricky Martin; Laura Pausini; Julión Álvarez; Yuri
- No. of contestants: 64 artists
- Winner: Guido Rochin
- Winning coach: Julión Álvarez
- Runner-up: Kike Jiménez

Release
- Original network: Las Estrellas
- Original release: September 7 – October 14, 2014

The fourth season of La Voz... México premiered on September 7, 2014 and concluded on December 14 of the same year. The Coaches that were part of this season were: Ricky Martin, Laura Pausini, Julión Álvarez and Yuri, having Jacqueline Bracamontes as host and Paty Cantú as backstage host.

== Coaches ==
Coaches of La Voz México season 4

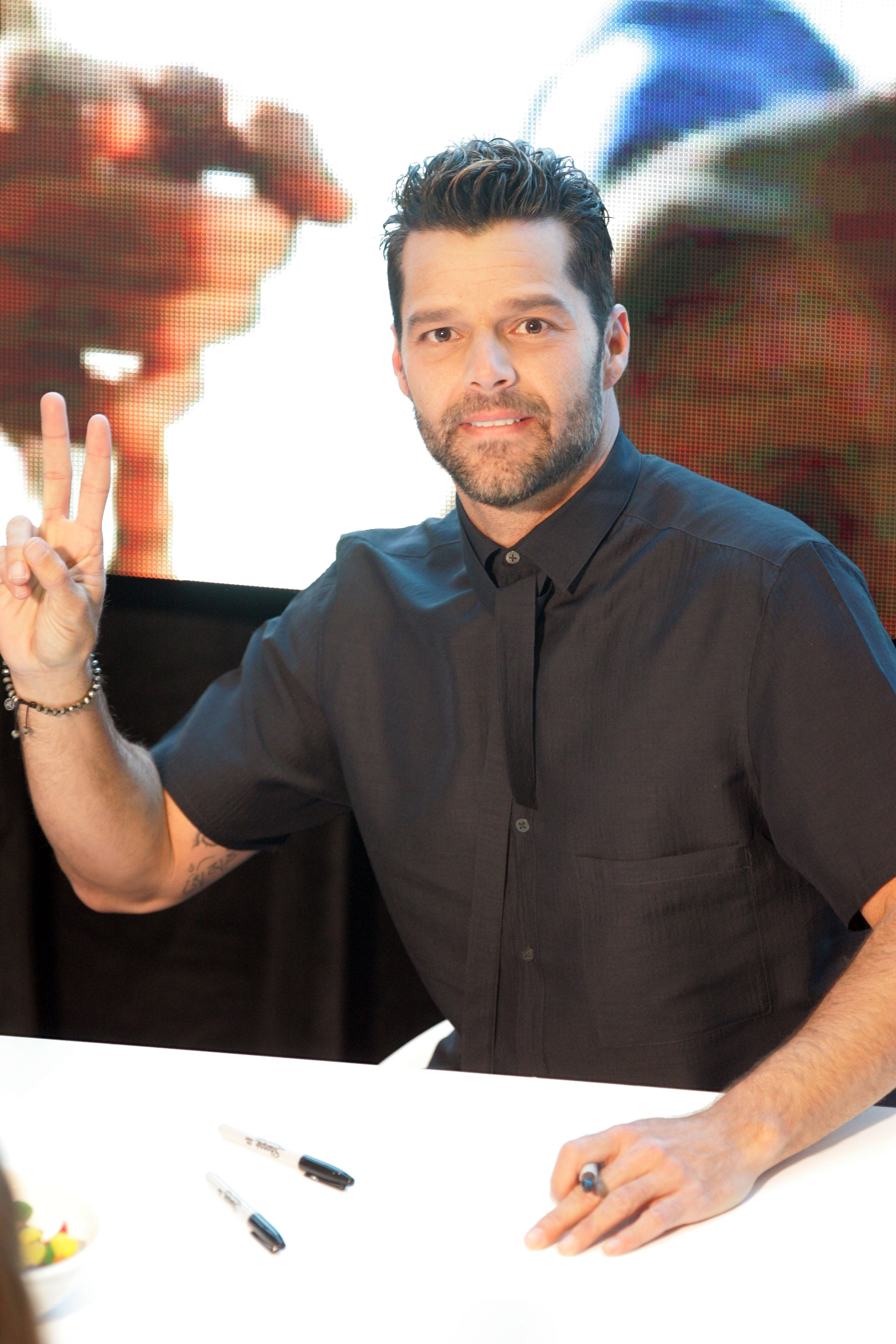
Ricky Martin

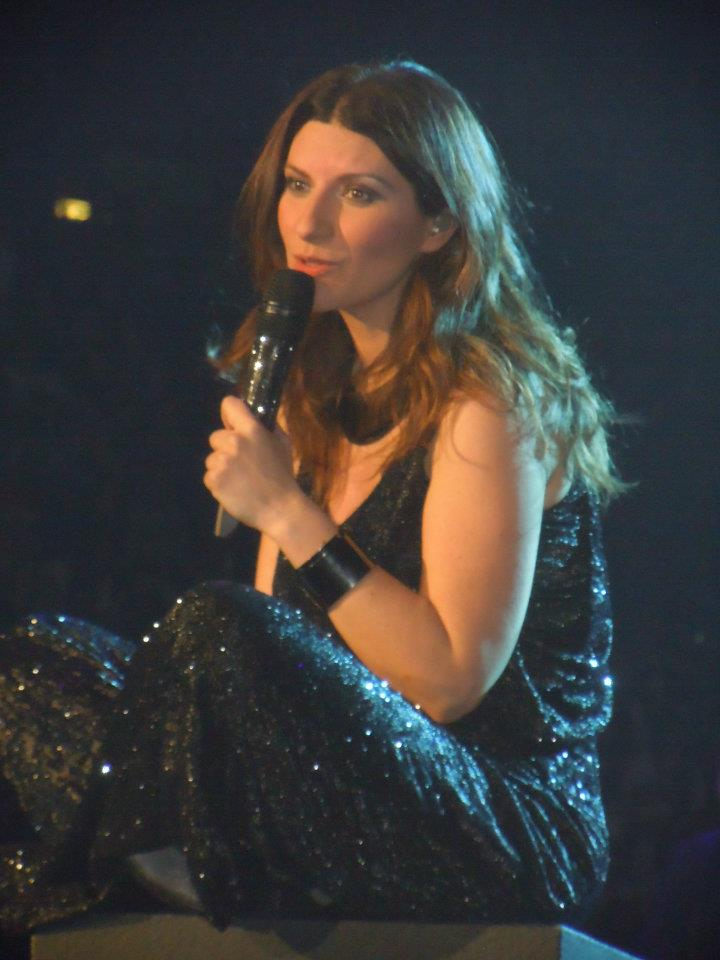
Laura Pausini

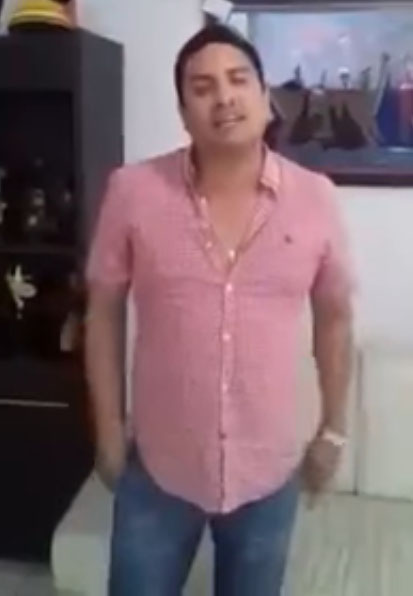
Julión Álvarez

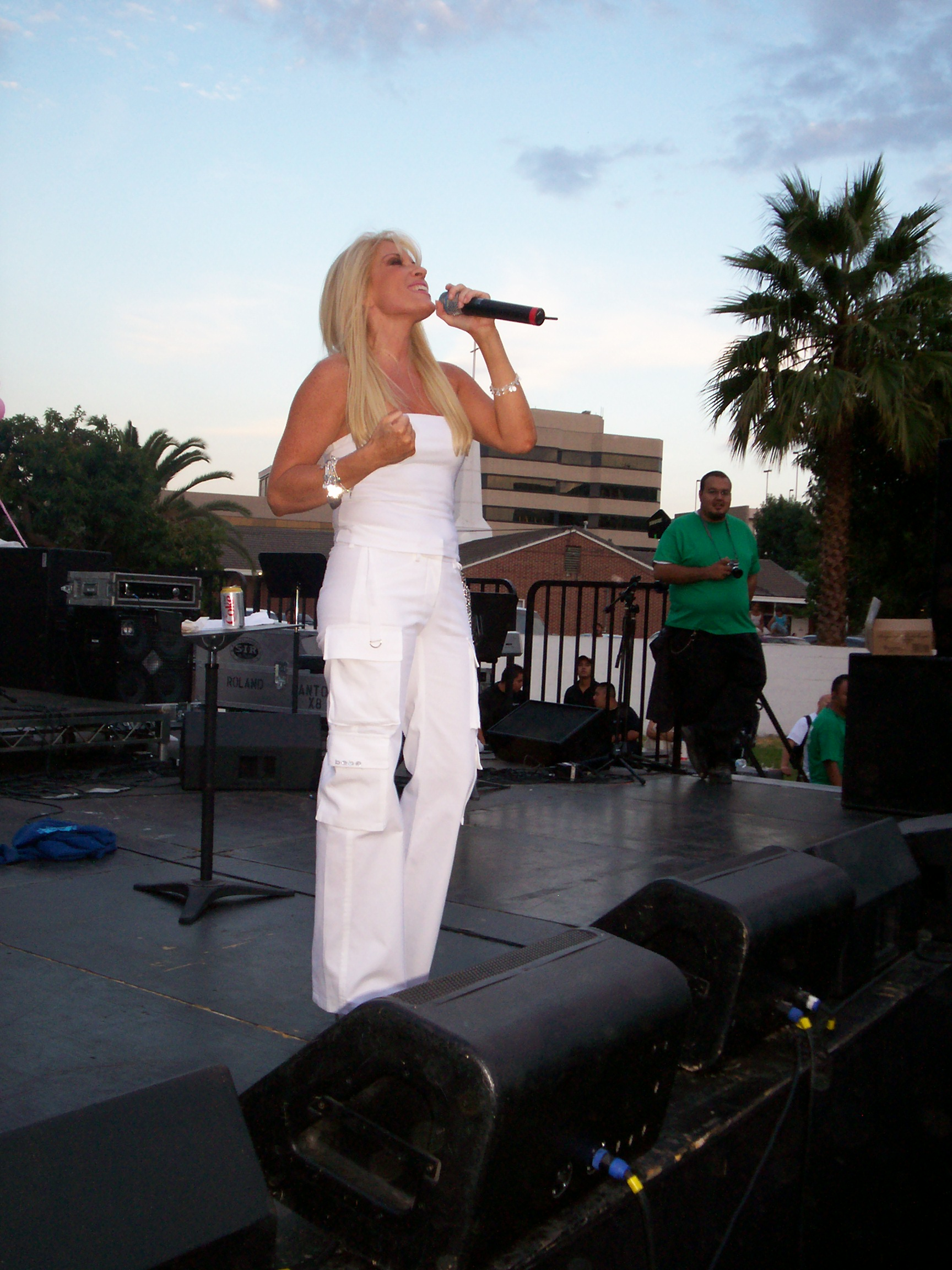
Yuri

After announcing that for the third time, no coach from the previous season would be present, the first coach confirmed by the media was Julión Álvarez, who was announced along with the first promos of the season. A couple of weeks later, Laura Pausini would be announced as the second coach. On July 23, producer Miguel Ángel Fox confirmed, during a radio broadcast, that the third and fourth coaches of La voz… México will be Ricky Martin and Yuri, and then on August 11, the same producer jointly presented the coaches of the new edition through an interview.

== Teams ==
Color key

Winner
Runner-up
Third place
Fourth place
Eliminated in the Semifinals
Eliminated in the Playoffs
Eliminated in the Knockouts
Stolen in the Battles
Eliminated in the Battles

Coaches	Top 64 artists				
Yuri					
Yuri	Natalia Sosa	Frank DI	Joel Espinoza	Marcela Gálvez	Lizbeth ✝ y Lizeth González
Yuri	Karem Priscilla	Luis Armando Campos	Mariolis Suárez	Cris Maass	Fer González
Yuri	Diamantina Rodriguez	~~Roberto Alvarado~~	Diana Alvort	Connie González	Jennifer Reyes
Yuri	Karen Quezada	Daniel Kelly	Clayton	Christopher Robin Tarim	
Julión Álvarez					
Julión Álvarez	Guido Rochin	Iliana Beilis	Par de Ases	Mike Miramontes	Daniela Pedali
Julión Álvarez	Jesús Ballesteros	Andrea López	Yaneth Sandoval	Paulina Muro	Samsara Huesca
Julión Álvarez	Daniel Flores	~~Jonathan Becerra~~	~~Allie~~	Bianka Romero	Jazmín Oropeza
Julión Álvarez	Karely Esparza	Hansen Flores	Christian Salazar	Betzaida Ramírez	
Laura Pausini					
Laura Pausini	Kike Jiménez	Jonathan Becerra	Melissa Galindo	Aynes López	Saak
Laura Pausini	Valeria & Denisse	Rox Cortés	Emilio Aceves	Irineo Maciel	Álvaro Gastón
Laura Pausini	Paulina Ramos	~~Polo Rojas~~	~~Mariolis Suárez~~	~~Iliana Beilis~~	~~Andrea Lopéz~~
Laura Pausini	Loreli Mancilla	Dante Hernández	Jimena Gallego	Claudia Isabel	
Ricky Martin					
Ricky Martin	Agina Álvarez	Sarah & Joe	Alejandro Blumenkron	Alex Hoyer	Mitsuo Yoshiki
Ricky Martin	Juan Palomares	Judas & Emmanuel	Allie	Silvia Rivera	Polo Rojas
Ricky Martin	Roberto Alvarado	~~Paulina Ramos~~	~~Diamantina Rodríguez~~	~~Daniela Pedali~~	~~Joel Espinoza~~
Ricky Martin	~~Emilio Aceves~~	Leo Méndez	Evelyn Molina	Joel Anaya	
Note: Italicized names are stolen artists (names struck through within former teams).

== Rounds ==
This season contained Five rounds: the First Stage was the Blind Auditions, where each Trainer recruited 16 participants; the Second was The Battles where each Trainer divided his team in half and The Robbery gave each Trainer the opportunity to steal three participants from another team thus passing with 11 participants; the Third was The Knockouts where each Trainer reduced their teams again by facing two or three participants, where only 5 passed; the Fourth round was the Playoffs where only 2 participants per Coach, the semifinalists of each Team, passed to the Fifth and Last Stage, the Live Shows.

== Blind Auditions ==
The objective of each coach will be to choose 16 participants during the six episodes of Auditions.

Blind auditions color key
✔	Coach pressed "QUIERO TU VOZ" button
	Artist defaulted to a coach's team
	Artist elected a coach's team
	Artist was eliminated with no coach pressing his or her "QUIERO TU VOZ" button
	Artist in Red, auditioned inside "The Box"

=== Episode 1 (September 7) ===
The coaches performed "We Will Rock You" at the beginning of the episode. During the course of the program Ricky Martin performed "Pégate" and Laura Pausini & Yuri performed "Cielito Lindo"

Order	Artist	Age	Hometown	Song	Coach's and artist's choices			
Order	Artist	Age	Hometown	Song	Yuri	Julión	Laura	Ricky
1	Daniel Flores	17	Hermosillo, Sonora	"Mi promesa"	✔	✔	✔	✔
2	Aldo Guerra Robles	22	Mexico City	"Todo cuenta"	—	—	—	—
3	Sarah & Joe (Sarah Gurrola & José Muñóz)	24 & 25	Guaymas & Hermosillo, Sonora	"Where Is the Love?"	✔	✔	✔	✔
4	Yolinda Joven	36	Tijuana, Baja California	"De qué te vale fingir"	—	—	—	—
5	Lizeth & Lizbeth González	17	Guaymas, Sonora	"Me gustas mucho"	✔	✔	✔	✔
6	Kike Jiménez	23	Guadalajara, Jalisco	"Love Me Again"	✔	✔	✔	✔
7	Jonathan Becerra	21	Guadalajara, Jalisco	"Hermosa experiencia"	✔	✔	✔	✔
8	Clara Flores	N/A	Guadalajara, Jalisco	"Empiezo a recordarte"	—	—	—	—
9	Alex Hoyer	17	Monterrey, Nuevo León	"All of Me"	✔	✔	✔	✔
10	Joss Bocanegra	27	Guadalajara, Jalisco	"Ojalá que llueva café"	—	—	—	—
11	Yaneth Sandoval	24	Tepic, Nayarit	"Por siempre tú"	✔	✔	✔	✔
12	Natalia Sosa	40	San Andrés Tuxtla, Veracruz	"La Loca"	✔	✔	✔	✔
13	Frank DI	21	Tijuana, Baja California	"Por cobardía"	✔	✔	✔	—

=== Episode 2 (September 14) ===
During the show, the Mexican singer, winner of The Voice of Poland (season 4), Juan Carlos Cano made an appearance along with Alejandra Guzmán singing Dream On and Aunque me mientas.

Order	Artist	Age	Hometown	Song	Coach's and artist's choices			
Order	Artist	Age	Hometown	Song	Yuri	Julión	Laura	Ricky
1	Perla Jazmín	22	Tijuana, Baja California	"Solo él y yo"	—	—	—	—
2	Alann Mora	21	Guadalajara, Jalisco	"Es mejor así"	—	—	—	—
3	Judas & Emmanuel Balderrama	20y19	Hermosillo, Sonora	"La llamada de mi ex"	—	—	✔	✔
4	Álvaro Gastón	32	Guadalajara, Jalisco	"Knockin' on Heaven's Door"	✔	✔	✔	✔
5	Aynes López	18	Culiacán, Sinaloa	"Sunday Morning"	—	—	✔	—
6	Carolina Montero	16	Los Mochis, Sinaloa	"¿Qué nos pasó?"	—	—	—	—
7	Juan Palomares	17	Caborca, Sonora	"Acaríciame"	—	✔	✔	✔
8	Paulina Muro	27	Mexico City	"Todo fue un show"	—	✔	—	—
9	Adalberto Ballesteros	27	Guadalajara, Jalisco	"Me voy a tomar la noche"	—	—	—	—
10	Karem Priscilla	20	Culiacán, Sinaloa	"Sabor a mí"	✔	✔	✔	✔
11	Cris Maass	26	Mexico City	"Un poco de amor"	✔	—	✔	—
12	Irineo Maciel	38	Tequila, Jalisco	"Amarte a la antigua"	—	✔	✔	✔
13	Emmanuel Okaury	24	Ecatepec, State of Mexico	"Mía"	—	—	—	—
14	Daniela Pedali	36	Mexico City / Italy	"Sola otra vez"	✔	✔	✔	✔

=== Episode 3 (September 21) ===
During the show, "Maldita primavera" was performed as a duet by Yuri and Laura Pausini, in Spanish and Italian

Order	Artist	Age	Hometown	Song	Coach's and artist's choices			
Order	Artist	Age	Hometown	Song	Yuri	Julión	Laura	Ricky
1	Christian Salazar	22	Guadalajara, Jalisco	"Mi razón de ser"	—	✔	✔	✔
2	Xava Drago	45	Los Cabos, Baja California Sur	"Aún"	—	—	—	—
3	Diana Alvort	28	Guadalajara, Jalisco	"La Vie en rose"	✔	✔	✔	—
4	Alejandro Blumenkron	30	Mexico City	"Superstition"	✔	✔	✔	✔
5	Connie González	23	Irapuato, Guanajuato	"Desesperada"	✔	—	—	—
6	Raymundo Valerio	17	Paso del Macho, Veracruz	"Mujer de piedra"	—	—	—	—
7	Iliana Beilis	24	Hermosillo, Sonora	"Teenage Dream"	✔	✔	✔	✔
8	Hansen Flores	24	Guadalajara, Jalisco	"Mi mayor anhelo"	—	✔	—	—
9	Daniela Gallardo	27	Guadalajara, Jalisco	"Kiss Me"	—	—	—	—
10	Valeria & Denisse (Andrea Valeria & Denisse Alarcón)	22 y 25	Mexico City	"Fotografía"	✔	✔	✔	—
11	Rox Cortés	34	Mexico City	"Fresh"	—	—	✔	—
12	Jesús Ballesteros	21	Monclova, Coahuila	"Eso y más"	—	✔	✔	—
13	Diamantina Rodríguez	34	Mexico City	"Con los ojos cerrados"	—	—	—	✔
14	Germán Loza "Larry Donas"	28	Mexicali, Baja California	"Acá entre nos"	—	—	—	—
15	Clayton	61	Tijuana, Baja California	"You're the First, the Last, My Everything"	✔	✔	—	✔
16	Paulina Ramos	20	Guadalajara, Jalisco	"Alma, corazón y vida"	✔	✔	✔	✔

=== Episode 4 (September 28) ===
Order	Artist	Age	Hometown	Song	Coach's and artist's choices			
Order	Artist	Age	Hometown	Song	Yuri	Julión	Laura	Ricky
1	Saak	18	Mexico City	"The Way You Make Me Feel"	✔	✔	✔	✔
2	Manuel Parra	22	Culiacán, Sinaloa	"Lo quiero a morir"	—	—	—	—
3	Christopher Robin Tarim	25	Mexico City	"Sunny"	✔	✔	—	—
4	Allie	27	Mexico City	"Ironic"	—	✔	—	—
5	Emily Ophir	25	Mexico City	"Un sueño que una vez soñé"	—	—	—	—
6	Mitsuo Yoshiki	28	Mexico City	"Let Her Go"	—	—	✔	✔
7	Emilio Aceves	22	Guadalajara, Jalisco	"New Sensation"	✔	✔	✔	✔
8	Gissel Millán	24	Hermosillo, Sonora	"A prueba de ti"	—	—	—	—
9	Silvia Rivera	45	San Miguel de Allende, Guanajuato	"Fever"	✔	✔	✔	✔
10	Samsara Huesca	23	Mexico City	"Crazy"	✔	✔	—	—
11	Dante Hernández	30	Mexico City	"Tu amor me hace bien"	—	—	✔	—
12	Carlos "El Nene" Duarte	17	Ciudad Obregón, Sonora	"Bohemio loco"	—	—	—	—
13	Marcela Gálvez	20	Los Angeles, California, U.S.	"Me entrego a ti"	✔	✔	—	✔
14	Melissa Galindo	26	Culiacán, Sinaloa	"Diamonds"	✔	✔	✔	✔

=== Episode 5 (October 5) ===
During the course of the show Ricky Martin sang his song Vuelve, for the studio audience. Also, Alex Hoyer from team Ricky, Lizeth and Lisbeth from team Yuri, Saak from team Pausini and Mike Miramontes from team Julión shared a moment with Austin Mahone and sang a fragment of "Mmm Yeah", by the singer himself

Order	Artist	Age	Hometown	Song	Coach's and artist's choices			
Order	Artist	Age	Hometown	Song	Yuri	Julión	Laura	Ricky
1	Betzaida Ramírez	32	Chicago, Illinois, U.S.	"Te quiero así"	—	✔	✔	✔
2	Daniel Kelly	23	Los Mochis, Sinaloa	"Te hubieras ido antes"	✔	—	✔	✔
3	Karina Esparza	24	Culiacán, Sinaloa	"Tú y yo"	—	—	—	—
4	Karely Esparza	29	Culiacán, Sinaloa	"Castillos"	✔	✔	✔	✔
5	Roberto Alvarado	23	Hermosillo, Sonora	"Como yo te amo"	✔	✔	—	—
6	Gabriela Corral	19	Ciudad Obregón, Sonora	"Entrega de amor"	—	—	—	—
7	Claudia Isabel	37	Guadalajara, Jalisco	"Te doy las gracias"	—	✔	✔	—
8	Viviana Ramos	21	Mexico City	"Yo por él"	—	—	—	—
9	Mike Miramontes	25	Guadalajara, Jalisco	"Niña"	✔	✔	✔	✔
10	Evelyn Molina	26	Los Angeles, California, U.S.	"Manías"	—	—	—	✔
11	Charly Saldaña	19	Guadalajara, Jalisco	"Dile al amor"	—	—	—	—
12	Luis Armando Campos	18	Tampico, Tamaulipas	"Para enamorarte de mí"	✔	✔	✔	✔
13	Leo Méndez	28	Torreón, Coahuila	"Me dediqué a perderte"	—	—	—	✔
14	Mariolis Suárez	26	Pinar del Río, Cuba	"La gata bajo la lluvia"	—	—	✔	—
15	Polo Rojas	34	Ciudad Mante, Tamaulipas	"Querida"	✔	—	✔	—

=== Episode 6 (October 12) ===
Order	Artist	Age	Hometown	Song	Coach's and artist's choices			
Order	Artist	Age	Hometown	Song	Yuri	Julión	Laura	Ricky
1	Joel Espinoza	21	Hermosillo, Sonora	"Mi olvido"	—	—	—	✔
2	Antar Soberanes	24	Guaymas, Sonora	"Un nuevo mundo sin ti"	—	—	—	—
3	Loreli Mancilla	32	Ciudad Juárez, Chihuahua	"Hacer el amor con otro"	—	—	✔	—
4	Agina Álvarez	25	Los Angeles, California, U.S.	"The Logical Song"	✔	—	✔	✔
5	Bianka Romero	24	Cuernavaca, Morelos	"Tu dama de hierro"	—	✔	—	—
6	Jimena Gallego	32	Mexico City	"Frente a frente"	—	—	✔	—
7	Par de Ases (Juan Carlos y José Manuel)	19 y 24	Hermosillo, Sonora	"La mejor de todas"	—	✔	✔	—
8	Jazmín Oropeza	25	Mexicali, Baja California	"Mi buen corazón"	—	—	✔	—
9	Pahola Escalera	22	Xalapa, Veracruz	"Mi tierra"	—	—	—	—
10	Fer González	32	Playa del Carmen, Q. Roo	"Best of You"	✔	—	—	—
11	Jennifer Reyes	25	Hermosillo, Sonora	"Desintoxicada"	✔	—	✔	—
12	Joel Anaya	22	San Juan del Río, Querétaro	"Hasta que te conocí"	✔	✔	✔	✔
13	Andrea López	20	Culiacán, Sinaloa	"Sin ti"	—	✔	✔	T/F
14	Karen Quezada	25	Mazatlán, Sinaloa	"Red Red Wine"	✔	✔	T/F	T/F
15	Guido Rochin	20	Tepic, Nayarit	"Por ti volaré"	T/F	✔	T/F	T/F

== The Battles ==
The Battle Round started on October 19. Contestants who win their battle or are stolen by another coach will advance to the Top 3 Round. The coaches will face 2 participants from their team in a duet, choosing one to pass the round, the other being eliminated from their team, in addition, each coach is awarded 3 "Steals", giving the opportunity to save losing participants advancing like this with 11 participants to the Knockouts. This is the first in 3 consecutive seasons to have no saves after battles, with non-steal eliminations being definitive exits from the competition. The winner and stolen participants will advance to the Knockouts round. The co-coaches in this edition were Mario Domm for team Ricky, Álex Ubago for team Pausini, Ricardo Montaner for team Julión and Poncho Lizárraga for team Yuri.

Color key:

Artist won the Battle and advanced to the Knockouts
Artist lost the Battle but was stolen by another coach and advanced to the Knockouts
Artist lost the Battle and was eliminated

Episode	Coach	Order	Winner	Song	Loser	'Steal' result			
Episode	Coach	Order	Winner	Song	Loser	Yuri	Julión	Laura	Ricky
Episode 7 (Sunday, October 19)	Julión Álvarez	1	Daniel Flores	"Tal vez"	Jonathan Becerra	✔	N/D	✔	✔
Episode 7 (Sunday, October 19)	Ricky Martin	2	Alex Hoyer	"El amor te va a encontrar"	Joel Anaya	—	—	—	N/D
Episode 7 (Sunday, October 19)	Laura Pausini	3	Irineo Maciel	"El destino"	Claudia Isabel	—	—	N/D	—
Episode 7 (Sunday, October 19)	Yuri	4	Natalia Sosa	"En cambio no"	Roberto Alvarado	N/D	—	—	✔
Episode 7 (Sunday, October 19)	Julión Álvarez	5	Guido Rochin	"Cielo rojo"	Betzaida Ramírez	—	N/D	—	—
Episode 7 (Sunday, October 19)	Laura Pausini	6	Melissa Galindo	"Genio atrapado"	Jimena Gallego	—	—	N/D	—
Episode 7 (Sunday, October 19)	Ricky Martín	7	Agina Álvarez	"Problem"	Paulina Ramos	✔	—	✔	N/D
Episode 8 (Sunday, October 26)	Ricky Martín	1	Sarah y Joe	"Duele el amor"	Diamantina Rodríguez	✔	—	✔	N/D
Episode 8 (Sunday, October 26)	Julión Álvarez	2	Par de Ases	"Borracho de amor"	Christian Salazar	—	N/D	—	—
Episode 8 (Sunday, October 26)	Yuri	3	Frank DI	"Vivir así es morir de amor"	Christopher Robin Tarim	N/D	—	—	—
Episode 8 (Sunday, October 26)	Julión Álvarez	4	Mike Miramontes	"No me compares"	Hansen Flores	—	N/D	—	—
Episode 8 (Sunday, October 26)	Laura Pausini	5	Kike Jiménez	"Can't Take My Eyes Off You"	Polo Rojas	✔	—	N/D	✔
Episode 8 (Sunday, October 26)	Yuri	6	Marcela Gálvez	"Callados"	Clayton	N/D	—	—	—
Episode 8 (Sunday, October 26)	Ricky Martin	7	Silvia Rivera	"No sé vivir si no es contigo"	Daniela Pedali	—	✔	—	N/D
Episode 9 (Sunday, November 2)	Julión Álvarez	1	Jesús Ballesteros	"Dónde está el amor"	Karely Esparza	—	N/D	—	—
Episode 9 (Sunday, November 2)	Ricky Martín	2	Judas y Emmanuel	"Consecuencia de mis actos"	Joel Espinoza	✔	—	—	N/D
Episode 9 (Sunday, November 2)	Laura Pausini	3	Rox Cortés	"Ya lo veía venir"	Dante Hernández	—	—	N/D	—
Episode 9 (Sunday, November 2)	Yuri	4	Lizeth y Lisbeth	"Mientes"	Daniel Kelly	N/D	—	—	—
Episode 9 (Sunday, November 2)	Ricky Martin	5	Juan Palomares	"Simplemente amigos"	Evelyn Molina	—	—	—	N/D
Episode 9 (Sunday, November 2)	Laura Pausini	6	Valeria y Denisse	"El primer día del resto de mi vida"	Loreli Mancilla	—	—	N/D	—
Episode 9 (Sunday, November 2)	Yuri	7	Fer González	"Afuera"	Karen Quezada	N/D	—	—	—
Episode 9 (Sunday, November 2)	Laura Pausini	8	Álvaro Gastón	"Puede ser"	Mariolis Suárez	✔	—	N/D	—
Episode 9 (Sunday, November 2)	Julión Álvarez	9	Samsara Huesca	"Amiga Mía"	Allie	T/F	N/D	—	✔
Episode 10 (Sunday, November 9)	Laura Pausini	1	Aynes López	"Mi persona favorita"	Iliana Beilis	T/F	✔	N/D	T/F
Episode 10 (Sunday, November 9)	Julión Álvarez	2	Yaneth Sandoval	"Ni lo intentes"	Jazmín Oropeza	T/F	—	N/D	T/F
Episode 10 (Sunday, November 9)	Yuri	3	Luis Armando Campos	"Solo el amor nos salvará"	Jennifer Reyes	T/F	—	—	T/F
Episode 10 (Sunday, November 9)	Ricky Martin	4	Mitsuo Yoshiki	"Tanto"	Leo Méndez	T/F	—	—	T/F
Episode 10 (Sunday, November 9)	Yuri	5	Cris Maass	"Mil horas"	Connie González	T/F	—	—	T/F
Episode 10 (Sunday, November 9)	Julión Álvarez	6	Paulina Muro	"Corazón en la maleta"	Binka Romero	T/F	N/D	—	T/F
Episode 10 (Sunday, November 9)	Laura Pausini	7	Saak	"Te perdiste mi amor"	Andrea López	T/F	✔	N/D	T/F
Episode 10 (Sunday, November 9)	Yuri	8	Karem Priscilla	"Te dejo en libertad"	Diana Alvort	T/F	T/F	—	T/F
Episode 10 (Sunday, November 9)	Ricky Martín	9	Alejandro Blumenkron	"I Got You (I Feel Good)"	Emilio Aceves	T/F	T/F	✔	T/F

Non-competition performances
Orden	Performer	Canción
7.1	Laura Pauini & Álex Ubago	"Donde quedo solo yo"
8.1	Ricky Martin & Mario Domm	"Perdón"
9.1	Yuri & Banda el Recodo	"Cuando baja la marea" / "Consecuencia de mis actos"
10.1	Julión Álvarez & Ricardo Montaner	"Te hubieras ido antes" / "Me va a extrañar"

== The Knockouts ==
The Knockout round included episodes 11 and 12. Each coach again reduced their teams through Deathmatches, four duos and one trio, with one winner each moving on to the next stage, the Playoffs. The participants will not know who their opponents will be until the moment of the presentation. With no more steals or rescues, the decisions would be final, the coach choosing one participant to advance, the others being automatically eliminated.

Color key:

Artist won the Knockout and advanced to the Playoffs
Artist lost the Knockout and was eliminated

Episode	Coach	Order	Song	Artist		Song
Episode	Coach	Order	Song	Winner	Losers	Song
Episode 11 (Sunday, November 16)	Laura Pausini	1	"Si yo fuera un chico"	Melissa Galindo	Paulina Ramos	"Como yo te amé"
Episode 11 (Sunday, November 16)	Yuri	2	"Debo hacerlo"	Frank DI	Diamantina Rodríguez	"Manos al aire"
Episode 11 (Sunday, November 16)	Yuri	2	"Debo hacerlo"	Frank DI	Fer González	"Entre dos tierras"
Episode 11 (Sunday, November 16)	Laura Pausini	3	"En mi corazón vivirás"	Saak	Irineo Maciel	"Perdóname"
Episode 11 (Sunday, November 16)	Julión Álvarez	4	"La malagueña"	Guido Rochin	Daniel Flores	"Pena tras pena"
Episode 11 (Sunday, November 16)	Ricky Martín	5	"Girlfriend"	Alex Hoyer	Roberto Alvarado	"¡Óyeme!"
Episode 11 (Sunday, November 16)	Yuri	6	"Fuera de mi vida"	Natalia Sosa	Cris Maass	"Eres"
Episode 11 (Sunday, November 16)	Laura Pausini	7	"Counting Stars"	Kike Jiménez	Álvaro Gastón	"Ángel"
Episode 11 (Sunday, November 16)	Julión Álvarez	8	"¡Basta Ya!"	Iliana Beilis	Samsara Huesca	"Oye"
Episode 11 (Sunday, November 16)	Julión Álvarez	8	"¡Basta Ya!"	Iliana Beilis	Paulina Muro	"¿Con quién se queda el perro?"
Episode 11 (Sunday, November 16)	Ricky Martin	9	"Contigo en la distancia"	Agina Álvarez	Polo Rojas	"Déjenme si estoy llorando"
Episode 12 (Sunday, November 23)	Yuri	1	"¿Cómo te va mi amor?"	Lizeth & Lisbeth	Mariolis Suárez	"Vivir mi vida"
Episode 12 (Sunday, November 23)	Ricky Martin	2	"El perdedor"	Mitsuo Yoshiki	Silvia Rivera	"El espejo"
Episode 12 (Sunday, November 23)	Julión Álvarez	3	"El amor que soñé"	Daniela Pedali	Yaneth Sandoval	"Siempre te amaré"
Episode 12 (Sunday, November 23)	Laura Pausini	4	"Te presumo"	Jonathan Becerra	Emilio Aceves	"Crazy"
Episode 12 (Sunday, November 23)	Yuri	5	"Te amo"	Marcela Gálvez	Karem Priscilla	"Que nadie sepa mi sufrir"
Episode 12 (Sunday, November 23)	Ricky Martin	6	"This Love"	Alejandro Blumenkron	Allie	"Bitch"
Episode 12 (Sunday, November 23)	Julión Álvarez	7	"Cero"	Mike Miramontes	Andrea López	"El aprendiz"
Episode 12 (Sunday, November 23)	Laura Pausini	8	"Mi historia entre tus dedos"	Aynes López	Valeria & Denisse	"Sin combustible"
Episode 12 (Sunday, November 23)	Laura Pausini	8	"Mi historia entre tus dedos"	Aynes López	Rox Cortés	"Solamente una vez"
Episode 12 (Sunday, November 23)	Yuri	9	"No me pidas perdón"	Joel Espinoza	Luis Armando Campos	"Un buen perdedor"
Episode 12 (Sunday, November 23)	Julión Álvarez	10	"Un hombre normal"	Par de Ases	Jesús Ballesteros	"Mátalas"
Episode 12 (Sunday, November 23)	Ricky Martin	11	"Someone like You"	Sarah & Joe	Judas & Emmanuel	"Tú ya eres cosa del pasado"
Episode 12 (Sunday, November 23)	Ricky Martin	11	"Someone like You"	Sarah & Joe	Juan Palomares	"Sola con mi soledad"

== The Playoffs ==
The Top 20 artist of this season will face each other individually. The decision will be based on the interpretive quality of the participant and the strategy of their coach. At the end of this episode, the eight finalists of this edition will be announced, two per team. The coach will name their participants who will have to go on stage and perform the assigned song, being the next participant called at the end of each performance, being the 2 best selected at the end.

Artist is chosen by their coach as a semi-finalist.
Artist is eliminated

Episode	Coach	Order	Artist	Song	Result
Episode 13 (Sunday, December 30)	Laura Pausini	1	Melissa Galindo	"Irremediable"	Eliminated
Episode 13 (Sunday, December 30)	Laura Pausini	2	Kike Jiménez	"Radioactive"	Semifinalist
Episode 13 (Sunday, December 30)	Laura Pausini	3	Jonathan Becerra	"Tatuado hasta los huesos"	Semifinalist
Episode 13 (Sunday, December 30)	Laura Pausini	4	Saak	"Suave"	Eliminado
Episode 13 (Sunday, December 30)	Laura Pausini	5	Aynes López	"Cuando nadie me ve"	Eliminated
Episode 13 (Sunday, December 30)	Julión Álvarez	1	Mike Miramontes	"Rendido a tus pies"	Eliminated
Episode 13 (Sunday, December 30)	Julión Álvarez	2	Iliana Beilis	"Bésame"	Semifinalist
Episode 13 (Sunday, December 30)	Julión Álvarez	3	Daniela Pedali	"Hoy tengo ganas de ti"	Eliminated
Episode 13 (Sunday, December 30)	Julión Álvarez	4	Par de Ases	"La historia de mis manos"	Eliminated
Episode 13 (Sunday, December 30)	Julión Álvarez	5	Guido Rochin	"Deja que salga la luna"	Semifinalist
Episode 13 (Sunday, December 30)	Yuri	1	Marcela Gálvez	"Todo mi corazón"	Eliminated
Episode 13 (Sunday, December 30)	Yuri	2	Frank DI	"¿Quieres ser mi amante?"	Semifinalist
Episode 13 (Sunday, December 30)	Yuri	3	Joel Espinoza	"Eres mi necesidad"	Eliminated
Episode 13 (Sunday, December 30)	Yuri	4	Lizeth y Lisbeth	"De mí enamórate"	Eliminated
Episode 13 (Sunday, December 30)	Yuri	5	Natalia Sosa	"Libre soy"	Semifinalist
Episode 13 (Sunday, December 30)	Ricky Martin	1	Alejandro Blumenkron	"Será que no me amas"	Eliminated
Episode 13 (Sunday, December 30)	Ricky Martin	2	Mitsuo Yoshiki	"Rival"	Eliminated
Episode 13 (Sunday, December 30)	Ricky Martin	3	Agina Álvarez	"Ain't It Fun"	Semifinalist
Episode 13 (Sunday, December 30)	Ricky Martin	4	Alex Hoyer	"Vuelve"	Eliminated
Episode 13 (Sunday, December 30)	Ricky Martin	5	Sarah y Joe	"Titanium"	Semifinalist

Performance fuera de competencia
Orden	Performer	Canción
13.1	Yuri & Reik	"Duele"
13.2	Pepe Aguilar	"Entre dos ríos"
13.3	Laura Pausini & Pepe Aguilar	"Amor eterno"

== Reception ==
This season of The Voice had a mixed reception in the media, having both positive and negative reviews within the same providers. The negative notes tended to focus on the controversy generated by artists considered "Professionals" within the format, the main one mentioned being Natalia Sosa who has a long career and is considered a reference in musical theater. This controversy was gaining strength from the audition when Natalia chose Yuri as her coach, whom she had previously met personally, despite the fact that the singer from Veracruz denied a close relationship in each interview, describing Natalia as an "acquaintance". Another well-known contestant to hit the stage was Xava Drago, ex-vocalist of the band CODA, who was not selected for any team after his blind audition. Drago's performance caused controversy within the broadcast. Drago assured: "I'm happy, I'm cool, I sang, they treated me well, it did make me crazy because of the way the judges treated me, but that's how it is, they're not the first people who don't like me." He also denied the versions that say he received a payment for participating in the broadcast. In the positive notes, an increase in the impact of the coaches was considered, counting on what to date is considered the most diverse and renowned panel within the broadcasts in Mexico, competing against the one from the second season (The first panel of coaches of 4 different nationalities).
