= Premio Lo Nuestro 2009 =

Latin Music awards show

21st Lo Nuestro Awards
- Date: March 26, 2009
- Location: BankUnited Center
- Country: Coral Gables, Florida, United States
- Hosted by: Eugenio Derbez; Ninel Conde

Television/radio coverage
- Network: Univision

Premio Lo Nuestro 2009 was held on Thursday March 26, 2009 at the BankUnited Center at the University of Miami in Coral Gables, Florida. It is broadcast live by Univision Network. The nominees were announced on Wednesday January 14, 2009 during a live televised morning show Despierta América! on Univision Network.

The show featured a short speech in both English and Spanish by U.S. president Barack Obama, the first time since his 2008 election campaign in which he utilized the Spanish language for a mass audience.

== Hosts ==
- Eugenio Derbez
- Ninel Conde

== Performers ==
- 01. — Wisin & Yandel — "Me Estas Tentando" — 04:00
- 02. — Gloria Trevi Along With Los Horóscopos de Durango — "Cinco Mintuos" — 03:36
- 03. — Luis Fonsi, Aleks Syntek, Noel Schajris & David Bisbal — "No Me Doy Por Vencido / Aquí Estoy Yo" — 05:36
- 04. — El Chapo De Sinaloa
- 05. — Enrique Iglesias Along With Wisin & Yandel — "Llóro Por Tí" — 04:04
- 06. — Alejandra Guzmán Along With Camila — "Hacer Él Amor Con Orto / Así Es A Final / Tú Eres Mi Luz" — 06:41
- 07. — Flex And Pee Wee — "Dime Si Te Vas Con Él" — 03:30
- 08. — Franco De Vita Along With K-Paz de la Sierra
- 09. — Reik
- 10. — Aventura — "Por Un Segundo" — 03:39
- 11. — Emmanuel
- 12. — Víctor Manuelle
- 13. — La Arrolladora Banda El Limón
- 14. — Fanny Lu
- 15. — NG2 Feat. Gilberto Santa Rosa — "Ella Menea" — 03:49

== Presenters ==
- Jorge Salinas
- Grupo Montéz de Durango
- Alessandra Rosaldo
- Angélica Vale
- Jenni Rivera
- Christopher Uckermann
- Christian Chávez
- Cristián de la Fuente
- Diana Reyes
- Alexandra Cheron
- MJ
- Silvia Pinal
- Los Horóscopos de Durango
- Lorena Herrera
- Camila
- Yuridia
- José Ángel Llamas
- Elizabeth Álvarez
- Pablo Montero
- Tommy Torres
- Eiza ("Lola")
- Pee Wee
- Gloria Trevi
- Juanes
- Gilberto Santa Rosa
- Scarlet Ortiz
- Alexis & Fido
- Elvis Crespo
- Olga Tañón
- Alacranes Musical
- Wilmer Valderrama (Guest Appearance)

== Special awards ==
=== Premio Lo Nuestro a la Excelencia (Lifetime Achievement Award) ===
- Emmanuel

=== Trayectoria Artist of the Year ===
- Alejandra Guzmán

== Pop ==
=== Album of the Year ===
1. 95/08 Exitos - Enrique Iglesias
2. Empezar Desde Cero - RBD
3. Entre Mariposas - Yuridia
4. Fuerza - Alejandra Guzmán
5. Tarde o Temprano - Tommy Torres

=== Male Artist ===
1. Alejandro Fernández
2. Chayanne
3. Enrique Iglesias
4. Luis Fonsi
5. Tommy Torres

=== Female Artist ===
1. Alejandra Guzmán
2. Gloria Trevi
3. Julieta Venegas
4. Kany García
5. Yuridia

=== Group or Duo ===
1. Belanova
2. Camila
3. Jesse & Joy
4. RBD
5. Reik

=== Breakout Artist or Group of the Year ===
1. Ana Isabelle
2. Eiza ("Lola")
3. Juan
4. La Nueva Banda Timbiriche
5. Playa Limbo

=== Song of the Year ===
1. "Ahora Entendí" - Yuridia
2. "Cada Que..." - Belanova
3. "¿Dónde Están Corazón?" - Enrique Iglesias
4. "Inalcanzable" - RBD
5. "Soy Solo Un Secreto" - Alejandra Guzmán

== Rock ==
=== Album of the Year ===
1. 17 - Motel
2. La Vida... Es un Ratico - Juanes
3. Arde El Cielo - Maná
4. Mucho - Babasónicos
5. Sino - Café Tacuba

=== Artist of the Year ===
1. Black Guayaba
2. Café Tacuba
3. Juanes
4. Maná
5. Motel

=== Song of the Year ===
1. "Arde el Cielo" - Maná
2. "Gotas de Agua Dulce" - Juanes
3. "Me Enamora" - Juanes
4. "Si No Te Hubieras Ido" - Maná
5. "Tres" - Juanes

== Tropical ==
=== Album of the Year ===
1. Contraste - Gilberto Santa Rosa
2. Con Todas Las de Ganar - NG2
3. Kings of Bachata: Sold Out at Madison Square Garden - Aventura
4. La Nueva Escuela Nu School - N'Klabe
5. Soy - Víctor Manuelle

=== Male Artist of the Year ===
1. Frank Reyes
2. Gilberto Santa Rosa
3. Juan Luis Guerra
4. Marc Anthony
5. Víctor Manuelle

=== Female Artist of the Year ===
1. Fanny Lu
2. Gloria Estefan
3. Milly Quezada
4. Olga Tañón

=== Group or Duo of the Year ===
1. Aventura
2. DLG
3. NG2
4. N'Klabe
5. Xtreme featuring Adrienne Bailon

=== Song of the Year ===
1. "Como Yo" - Juan Luis Guerra
2. "Conteo Regresivo" - Gilberto Santa Rosa
3. "El Perdedor" - Aventura
4. "Ella Menea" - NG2
5. "No Te Vayas" - Gilberto Santa Rosa

=== Merengue Artist of the Year ===
1. Elvis Crespo
2. Juan Luis Guerra
3. Los Hermanos Rosario
4. Olga Tañón
5. Raul Acosta and Oro Solido

=== Tropical Salsa Artist of the Year ===
1. Gilberto Santa Rosa
2. Marc Anthony
3. NG2
4. N'Klabe
5. Víctor Manuelle

=== Tropical Traditional Artist of the Year ===
1. Andy Andy
2. Aventura
3. Fonseca
4. Frank Reyes
5. Héctor Acosta

== Regional Mexican Music ==
=== Album of the Year ===
1. Y Que Quede Claro - La Arrolladora Banda El Limón
2. Capaz de Todo Por Tí - K-Paz de la Sierra
3. Con Banda - Los Dareyes de la Sierra
4. La Historia - El Chapo de Sinaloa
5. Que Bonito…Es Lo Bonito - Banda el Recodo

=== Male Artist of the Year ===
1. El Chapo de Sinaloa
2. El Potro de Sinaloa
3. Fidel Rueda
4. Marco Antonio Solís
5. Vicente Fernández

=== Female Artist of the Year ===
1. Diana Reyes
2. Graciela Beltrán
3. Isabela
4. Jenni Rivera

=== Group or Duo of the Year ===
1. Alacranes Musical
2. Conjunto Primavera
3. Montez de Durango
4. La Arrolladora Banda El Limón
5. Los Creadorez del Pasito Duranguense de Alfredo Ramírez

=== Breakout Artist or Group of the Year ===
1. AK-7
2. Aliados de la Sierra
3. Germán Montero
4. Los Pikadientes de Caborca
5. Uranio

=== Song of the Year ===
1. "Hasta el Día de Hoy" - Los Dareyes de la Sierra
2. "Si Te Agarran Las Ganas" - El Chapo de Sinaloa
3. "Sobre Mis Pies" - La Arrolladora Banda El Limón
4. "Te Lloré" - Conjunto Primavera
5. "Un Buen Perdedor" - K-Paz de la Sierra with Franco De Vita

=== Banda of the Year ===
1. El Chapo de Sinaloa
2. El Potro de Sinaloa
3. Jenni Rivera
4. La Arrolladora Banda El Limón
5. Los Dareyes de la Sierra

=== Duranguense Artist of the Year ===
1. Alacranes Musical
2. Montez de Durango
3. K-Paz de la Sierra
4. Los Creadorez del Pasito Duranguense de Alfredo Ramírez
5. Patrulla 81

=== Grupera Artist of the Year ===
1. Bronco El Gigante de América
2. Control
3. Grupo Bryndis
4. Los Temerarios
5. Marco Antonio Solís

=== Norteño Artist of the Year ===
1. Conjunto Primavera
2. Intocable
3. Linderos del Norte
4. Los Rieleros del Norte
5. Los Tigres del Norte

=== Ranchera Artist of the Year ===
1. Pedro Fernández
2. Pepe Aguilar
3. Vicente Fernández

== Urban ==
=== Album of the Year ===
1. King of Kings Live - Don Omar
2. Wisin vs. Yandel: Los Extraterrestres - Wisin & Yandel
3. Showtime - Angel & Khriz
4. Sobrenatural - Alexis & Fido
5. Te Quiero - Flex

=== Artist of the Year ===
1. Alexis & Fido
2. Daddy Yankee
3. Don Omar
4. Flex
5. Wisin & Yandel

=== Song of the Year ===
1. "Ahora Es" - Wisin & Yandel
2. "He Venido" - MJ
3. "Sexy Movimiento" - Wisin & Yandel
4. "Te Quiero" - Flex
5. "Ya No Llores" - Baby Boy

== Video of the Year ==
1. La Novela - Akwid
2. Pose - Daddy Yankee
3. Tu Adiós No Mata - Intocable
4. Un Beso de Desayuno - Calle 13
5. Visible - Jaguares
