= Lipstick (disambiguation) =

Lipstick is a cosmetic product.

Lipstick may also refer to:

== Film and television ==
- Lipstick (1960 film), an Italian crime drama
- Lipstick (1976 film), starring Margaux and Mariel Hemingway
- Lipstick (2024 film), a Bangladeshi film starring Puja Cherry
- Lipstick (TV series), a Hindi-language Indian series
- Why I Wore Lipstick to My Mastectomy, a 2006 television movie

== Music ==
=== Songs ===
- "Lipstick" (Alejandra Guzmán song), 2004
- "Lipstick" (Alesha song), 2006
- "Lipstick" (Charlie Puth song), 2023
- "Lipstick" (Elise Estrada song), 2010
- "Lipstick" (Jedward song), 2011
- "Lipstick" (Rocket from the Crypt song), 1998
- "Lipstick", a 2005 single by Rockie Lynne
- "Lipstick"/"Ichiban Boshi", a 2007 single by Sachi Tainaka
- "Lipstick"/"Lamu no Love Song", a 2012 single by Orange Caramel
- "Lipstick", by Cassidy from Split Personality
- "Lipstick", a 2016 single by Runaway June
- "Lipstick", by Kungs from Club Azur
- "Lipstick", by Suzi Quatro from Rock Hard

=== Other uses in music ===
- Lipstick (band), an all-girl Mongolian pop band
- Lipstick (Alejandra Guzmán album), 2004
- Lipstick (Orange Caramel album), 2012
- Lipstick, a 2014 album by Lipstick Generation including Billy Morris

== Other uses ==
- Lois Long (1901–1974), American magazine writer
- Lipstick plant, several Aeschynanthus species
