= 15 Éxitos (Alejandra Guzmán album) =

Greatest hits album by Alejandra Guzmán
- Released: April 2, 2002
- Genre: Latin Pop, Rock, Rock en Español
- Label: Fonovisa

Alejandra Guzmán chronology
Soy (2001)	15 Éxitos (2002)	Ellas Cantan Así (2003)

15 Éxitos is a compilation album by Mexican singer Alejandra Guzmán. It was released by her former record label Fonovisa and includes fifteen tracks recorded by her from 1988 to 1991.

== Track listing ==
No.	Title	Writer(s)	Length
1.	"Eternamente Bella"	José Ramón Flores	3:29
2.	"Llama Por Favor"	Gian Pietro Difelisatti/Flores	4:24
3.	"Hacer el Amor con Otro"	Difelisatti/Consuelo Arang	4:42
4.	"Soy Tuya Mi Amor"	Ray Davies	2:35
5.	"Di Que Si, Di Que No"	Consuelo Arango	3:51
6.	"Dame Tu Amor"	Richie Cordell/Joey Levine	2:57
7.	"Luz de Luna"	Loris Ceroni/Miguel Blasco/Flores	3:06
8.	"No Seas Cruel"	Elvis Presley/Otis Blackwell	2:27
9.	"Cuidado Con el Corazón"	Flores	3:36
10.	"Un Grito en la Noche"	Consuelo Arango	3:57
11.	"Satisfacción"	Mick Jagger/Keith Richards	3:31
12.	"Me Cuesta Mucho Amarte"	Difelisatti/Consuelo Arango	4:32
13.	"Reina de Corazones"	Flores	3:31
14.	"Guante de Seda"	Miguel Blasco/Flores	3:07
15.	"Rosas Rojas"	Flores	4:58

== Personnel ==
- Alejandra Guzmán – vocals
- Corky James – acoustic guitar, bass, electric guitar
