= Reina de Corazones =

Reina de corazones may refer to:

- Reina de corazones (American TV series)
- Reina de corazones (Venezuelan TV series)
- Reina de Corazones (album), a compilation album by Alejandra Guzmán
