= Alejandra Guzman En Vivo =

Alejandra Guzmán En Vivo

Live album by Alejandra Guzmán
- Released: (United States) September 23, 2003
- Genres: Latin pop, Rock, Rock en español
- Label: RCA

Alejandra Guzmán chronology
Ellas Cantan Así (2003)	Alejandra Guzmán En Vivo (2003)	Lipstick (2004)

Alejandra Guzmán En Vivo is the second live album recorded by Mexican singer Alejandra Guzmán. A DVD with the full concert was also released. The only new track included is a version of "Wild Thing" by Chip Taylor.

== Track listing ==
1. "Ruge El Corazón" (Marina, Sánchez, Valle) — 03:52
2. "Toda La Mitad" (Bastante, Antonio Garcia De Diego, Pancho Varona) — 04:11
3. "Eternamente Bella" (Florez) — 03:21
4. "Cuidado Con El Corazón" (Florez) — 05:11
5. "Mala Hierba" (Marina, Sánchez, Valle) — 03:25
6. "Ven" (Octavio Muñoz) — 02:36
7. "Todo" (Gary Burr, Desmond Child, Jonny Lang) — 04:16
8. "Algo Natural" (Jorge Villamisar) — 4:28
9. "Reina De Corazónes" (Florez, Valle) — 03:00
10. "Hey Güera" (Gian Pietro Felisatti, Florez) — 04:04
11. "Loca" (Myra Stella Turner) — 05:00
12. "Wild Thing" (Chip Taylor) — 02:58
13. "Hacer Él Amor Con Otro" (Felisatti, Florez) — 06:17
14. "Enemigos" (Sandra Baylac) — 04:00
15. "De Verdad" (Steve Mandile, Jodi Marr, Julia Sierra) — 03:48
16. "Caramelo" (Elsten Creole Torres) — 02:58
17. "Mírala, Míralo" (Felisatti, Florez) — 03:38
18. "Diablo" (Randy Cantor, Alejandra Guzmán, Jodi Marr) — 04:00
19. "Volveré a Amar" (Desmond Child, Richie Supa) — 05:20
20. "Popurrí: La Plaga/Popotitos/Pólvora" (Robert Blackwell, John Marascalco, Ian Samwell Ralph, Larry Williams) — 05:09

== Personnel ==
- Abraham Barrera – piano, keyboards
- Iván Barrera – bass
- Javier Barrera – arranger, drums, musical direction
- Cristhian Cambresy – graphic design
- Oscar Galvan – acoustic guitar, electric guitar
- Alejandro Giacomán – mastering
- Guillermo Gutiérrez – A&R
- Alejandra Guzmán – vocals
- Marielos Labias – chorus
- Antonio Maldonado – mixing
- Jorge Mendoza – digital processing
- Javier Olmedo – coordination, creative consultant
- Gilda Oropeza – A&R
- Daniel Parra – chorus
- Samuel Parra – chorus
- Miguel Pasos – electric guitar
