= ...De Piel Negra =

Greatest hits album by Alejandra Guzmán
- Released: 1994
- Recorded: 1988–1993
- Genre: Pop rock
- Label: Fonovisa

Alejandra Guzmán chronology
Libre (1993)	...De Piel Negra (1994)	Enorme (1994)

...De Piel Negra is a greatest hits album by Mexican rock singer Alejandra Guzmán. It was released in 1994. The album has seven songs that had been released previously, and three new songs.

== Track listing ==
No.	Title	Writer(s)	Length
1.	"Luz De Luna"	Miguel Blasco, Loris Ceroni, Florez	3:02
2.	"Hacer Él Amor Con Otro"	Felisatti, Florez	4:39
3.	"Verano Peligroso"	Valle, Matamoros	3:09
4.	"Ganas De Bailar"	Felisatti, Florez	3:27
5.	"Rosas Rojas"	Felisatti, Florez	4:59
6.	"Piel Negra"	Ferre, Florez	3:38
7.	"Cuidado Con El Corazón"	Valle, Florez	3:34
8.	"Mirala, Miralo"	Felisatti, Florez	4:05
9.	"Necesito Más"	Felisatti, Florez	4:41
10.	"Eternamente Bella"	Felisatti, Florez	3:26
