= Soy Sólo Un Secreto =

"Soy Solo Un Secreto"

Single by Alejandra Guzmán

from the album Fuerza
- Released: 2007 (Mexico)
- Recorded: 2007
- Genre: Latin Pop
- Label: EMI
- Songwriter(s): José Luis Pagán, Alejandra Guzmán

Alejandra Guzmán singles chronology
"Quiero Estar Contigo" (2006)	"Soy Solo Un Secreto" (2007)	"Hasta el Final" (2008)

"Soy Solo Un Secreto" (Eng.: I Am Only a Secret) is the first single of Alejandra Guzmán's thirteen studio album Fuerza. The song was produced by Loris Ceroni and written by José Luis Pagán and Alejandra Guzmán.

The song has become another success for the artist peaking after nine weeks on the chart at number 17 on the Billboard Hot Latin Tracks on the week of February 2, 2008 and number 6 in Mexico. "Soy Sólo Un Secreto" was nominated for Pop Song of the Year at the 21st Lo Nuestro Awards.

== Chart performance ==
Chart (2007)	Peak position
USA Billboard Hot Latin Tracks	12
USA Billboard Latin Pop Airplay	5
