= Red Lipstick =

Red lipstick is a popular kind of lipstick. The term may also refer to:

- "Red Lipstick", a song by Rihanna from Talk That Talk
- "Red Lipstick", a song by Nomo, a band that included David Batteau
- "Red Lipstick", a song by Trey Songz from Passion, Pain & Pleasure
- "Red Lipstick", a song by Skint & Demoralised from Love and Other Catastrophes
- Red Lipstick, a 2000 independent film

== See also ==
- Lipstick (disambiguation)
