= Volveré a Amar =

Single by Alejandra Guzmán

from the album Soy
- Released: 2002 (Mexico)
- Recorded: 2001
- Genre: Latin Pop, Rock en Español
- Length: 3:45
- Label: BMG
- Songwriters: Desmond Child, Richie Supa

Alejandra Guzmán singles chronology
"Diablo" (2002)	"Volveré a Amar" (2002)	"Quiero Vivir" (2002)

"Volveré a Amar" (Eng.: Loving Again) is the third single released from Soy the tenth studio album by Mexican singer Alejandra Guzmán. The track was written by songwriters Desmond Child, and Richie Supa.

No video was shot for the single. The song deals with the issue of falling in love after a heartbreak. This track is also included, on its original version, on the album Reina de Corazones, and also is featured on La Guzmán: Primera Fila (2013), a live album by Guzmán.

== Chart performance ==
Chart (2002)	Peak position
USA Billboard Latin Pop Airplay	31
