= Frente a frente =

Frente a Frente

Studio album by Lucía Méndez
- Released: 1976
- Recorded: 1976
- Genre: Música Ranchera
- Label: RCA Records

Lucía Méndez chronology
Siempre Estoy Pensando en Ti (1975)	Frente a Frente (1976)	La Sonrisa del Año (1977)

Frente a Frente is the second album by Mexican actress and pop singer Lucía Méndez. It was released in 1976.

== Track listing ==
1. Frente a frente (Juan Gabriel)
2. Hay que saber perder (Abel Domínguez)
3. Mi vida está rosa (Fernando Z. Maldonado)
4. Perdón si te molesté (Cuco Sánchez)
5. No me quieras tanto (Rafael Hernández)
6. Tu y la mentira (José Alfredo Jiménez)
7. A mi manera (Paul Anka, Claude François, Lucien "Gilles" Thibaut, Jacques Révaux)
8. Permiteme volver (Tirzo Paiz)
9. Cariño nuevo (José Ángel Espinoza "Ferrusquilla'")
10. Desesperanza (Gonzálo Curiel)

== Commercial reception ==
In the United States, Frente a frente charted at No. 16 on Billboard's Hot Latin LPs special survey on December 17, 1977.

== Singles ==
- Frente a frente (Juan Gabriel) / Mi vida está rosa (Fernando Z. Maldonado)
- Hay que saber perder (Abel Domínguez) / Cariño nuevo (José Ángel Espinoza "Ferrusquilla")

== Video Clips ==
- Frente a frente
