= Único (album) =

Studio album by Alejandra Guzmán
- Released: 24 November 2009
- Recorded: 2008
- Genre: Pop
- Label: EMI Latin
- Producer: Graeme Pleeth

Alejandra Guzmán chronology
Fuerza (2007)	Único (2009)	20 Años de Éxitos En Vivo con Moderatto (2011)

Singles from Único
- 1. "Mentiras Piadosas" Released: October 5, 2009; 2. "¿Por Qué No Estás Aquí?" Released: February 15, 2010

Único (Only) is the 13th album of music by Mexican female rock singer Alejandra Guzmán. The album's songs were influenced by British Rock; it was recorded in 2008 in several studios including Nashville and London. It was released in 2009. It contains a cover of Dolcenera's song Il mio amore unico.

== Track listing ==
No.	Title	Writer(s)	Length
1.	"No voy a esperar"	Mario Domm, Monica Velez	03:14
2.	"Mentiras piadosas"	Jerry Demara	03:28
3.	"Rezo (I Pray)"	Ivan Sevillano Pérez "Huecco"	03:14
4.	"Amor en suspenso (Crocodile Tears)"	Roxanne Seeman, Philipp Steinke, Alejandra Guzmán, Fernando Osorio	03:53
5.	"Ahogada en tu tristeza"	Jose Portilla, Marco Olivera	03:59
6.	"Algo que no está"	Franco de Vita, Jeremías	04:52
7.	"Ella"	Alejandra Guzmán, Jose Luis Pagan	03:41
8.	"¿Por qué no estás aquí?"	Jose Luis Pagan, Alejandra Guzmán	04:14
9.	"Único (Il mio amore unico)"	O. Avogadro, Emanuela Trane, G.P. Ameli, S. Lanza	03:44
10.	"No importa la hora"	Graeme Pleeth, Alejandra Guzmán	03:32

== Promotion ==
=== Singles ===
The album's lead single, "Mentiras Piadosas" (White Lies) was released on October 9, 2009. A pop rock ballad, written by J.R. Flores and Valle, was inspired by the singers turbulent life, personal resilience, and the chaotic nature of fame. The song was first performed at the Zacatecas National Fair on September 14, 2009 prior to its release.

"¿Por Qúe No Estás Aquí? " (Why are you not Here?) was released as the album’s second and final single on February 15, 2010. Written by the singer herself with José Luis "Pepe" Pagán who’s written and produce songs for other top Latin artist like Chayanne, Jennifer Lopez, Il Volo and Thalía.

== Sales and certifications ==
Weekly charts

Chart (2009)	Peak position
México Álbumes Top 100	8 (x2)
US Billboard Latin Pop Albums	13
US Billboard Top Latin Albums	41

Year-end charts

Fin de año	Posición
México Álbumes Top 100 - 2009	76
México Álbumes Top 100 - 2010	91

Sales

Region	Certification	Certified units/sales
Mexico (AMPROFON)	Gold	30,000^{^}
^{^} Shipments figures based on certification alone.
