= Indeleble =

Studio album by Alejandra Guzmán
- Released: April 4, 2006
- Genre: Pop
- Label: RCA; Sony BMG
- Producer: Loris Ceroni

Alejandra Guzmán chronology
Lipstick (2004)	Indeleble (2006)	Fuerza (2007)

Indeleble (Indelibre) is the eleventh studio album by Mexican singer Alejandra Guzmán. It was released on April 4, 2006 by RCA and Sony BMG. The album was produced by Loris Ceroni and features songs written by Mario Domm, lead singer of the Mexican group Camila and Kalimba.

It is one of the best-reviewed albums on Guzman's career and also is the responsible for bringing her back to the top of the charts in Mexico. The album won the Best Album prize at the Oye Awards in Mexico. Also received two nominations for the Latin Grammy Awards of 2006 for Best Rock Solo Performance and Best Rock Song for the first single "Volverte a Amar", losing both to Gustavo Cerati.

The album yielded a second single, "Quiero Estar Contigo" and the track "Necesito Amarme" was featured on the Mexican film Así del Precipicio.

It reached platinum status in Mexico peaking at #1 in the charts. Also peaked at #21 on the Billboard's Top Latin Albums chart and #22 on the Heatseekers survey.

== Track listing ==
No.	Title	Writer(s)	Length
1.	"Quiero Estar Contigo"	Ettore Grenci, Alejandra Guzmán, Mario Domm	03:38
2.	"Déjalo"	Erik Buffat, Oscar Schiebell, Loris Ceroni	04:27
3.	"No Estoy Llorando"	Ettore Grenci, Kalimba	03:03
4.	"Al Final De Cuentas"	Amerika, Luis Fernando Ochoa, Tommy Torres	03:34
5.	"Volverte a Amar"	Alejandra Guzmán, Mario Domm	03:41
6.	"Mujer"	Alejandra Guzmán, Jodi Marr, George Noriega	03:42
7.	"Necesito Amarme"	Alejandra Guzmán, Mario Domm	03:05
8.	"Tirando Piedras"	Alejandra Guzmán, Cesar Valle, Jodi Marr	03:57
9.	"Marta"	Paty Cantú, Cesar Valle	03:21
10.	"Bye Bye"	Claudia Brant	03:52
11.	"Siénteme A Tu Lado"	Alejandra Guzmán, Rot Iavari, Luis Liranzo, Jodi Marr	04:09

== Singles ==
#	Title
1.	"Volverte a Amar"
2.	"Quiero estar contigo"
3.	"Mujer"

== Charts ==
Chart (2007)	Peak position
Mexico Top 100	1
U.S. Billboard Top Heatseekers	21
U.S. Billboard Top Latin Albums	22
U.S. Billboard Latin Pop Albums	12

== Sales and certifications ==
Region	Certification	Certified units/sales
Mexico (AMPROFON)	Platinum	100,000^{^}
^{^} Shipments figures based on certification alone.
