= Siempre Estoy Pensando en Ti =

Compilation album by Juan Gabriel
- Released: March 7, 1978
- Recorded: 1974–1976
- Genre: Pop Latino, mariachi
- Length: 28:49
- Label: RCA Records

Siempre Estoy Pensando en Ti (English: I'm Always Thinking of You) is a compilation album released by Mexican singer-songwriter Juan Gabriel with mariachi in 1978 and re-release on July 18, 1989. The track listing combines songs from the 1974 album: Con El Mariachi Vargas De Tecalitlán and 1976 album: Con Mariachi Vol. II.

== Track listing ==
No.	Title	Length
1.	"Siempre Estoy Pensando En Ti (From: Con Mariachi Vol. II 1976)"	3:30
2.	"Ases y Tercia De Reyes (From: Con El Mariachi Vargas De Tecalitlán 1974)"	1:54
3.	"Nuestros Corazones (From: Con Mariachi Vol. II 1976)"	2:18
4.	"La Muerte Del Palomo (From: Con El Mariachi Vargas De Tecalitlán 1974)"	3:28
5.	"Esta Noche Voy a Verla (From: Con El Mariachi Vargas De Tecalitlán 1974)"	2:39
6.	"Nos Vemos Mañana (From: Con Mariachi Vol. II 1976)"	2:48
7.	"Lagrimas y Lluvia (From: Con El Mariachi Vargas De Tecalitlán 1974)"	3:05
8.	"Otra Vez Me Enamore (From: Con Mariachi Vol. II 1976)"	2:47
9.	"Que Sea Mi Condena (From: Con El Mariachi Vargas De Tecalitlán 1974)"	3:12
10.	"Si Dios Me Ayuda (From: Con El Mariachi Vargas De Tecalitlán 1974)"	3:03
