= Algo Natural =

Studio album by Alejandra Guzmán
- Released: September 14, 1999 (United States)
- Genres: Pop; Adult Contemporary
- Labels: RCA; BMG
- Producers: Juan Carlos Calderón, Oscar Lopez

Alejandra Guzmán chronology
La Guzmán (1997)	Algo Natural (1999)	Soy (2001)

Algo Natural (Something Natural) is the eighth studio album recorded by Mexican singer Alejandra Guzmán, and it was released on September 14, 1999 by RCA and BMG U.S. Latin.

== Album information ==
The album was her second produced by Oscar Lopez (tracks 1 to 7) and the first by Juan Carlos Calderón (tracks 9 to 14), and both co-produced the track "Paloma Herida". It is the first album by the singer to include more than eleven tracks (and to date the only) with fourteen. This was the only time that Guzmán worked with both producers.

Three singles were released to promote the album, "Algo Natural", "Enemigos" and "Si no te has ido, vete". "Enemigos" being the most successful. She received a Latin Grammy nomination for Best Female Rock Vocal Performance. It lost to Shakira's "Octavo Día" at the first Latin Grammy Awards.

At the time of release, this album was considered a flop, but eventually led to a Gold Certification in Mexico.

== Track listing ==
No.	Title	Writer(s)	Length
1.	"Enemigos"	Sandra Baylac	04:11
2.	"Grita"	Pachi López, Reyli Barba	03:21
3.	"Si No Te Has Ido, Vete"	Reyli Barba	03:05
4.	"Algo Natural"	Jorge Villamizar	03:57
5.	"Volaré"	Alejandra Guzmán, Didi Gutman	03:31
6.	"Vuelvo a Besar (feat. Johnny "Papi-Chulo" Wiggins)"	V. Gandini	03:43
7.	"Bye, Bye Love"	Freddy Committee, Jorge Montesano	03:25
8.	"Paloma Herida"	Juan Carlos Calderón	04:15
9.	"Me Perdí en Tu Cuerpo"	Juan Carlos Calderón	04:44
10.	"Mátame"	Juan Carlos Calderón	03:44
11.	"Qué Más Da"	Juan Carlos Calderón	02:59
12.	"Había Olvidado"	Juan Carlos Calderón	03:06
13.	"Haz la Guerra y el Amor"	Juan Carlos Calderón	02:54
14.	"Por Qué Tengo Que Amarte"	Juan Carlos Calderón	03:14

== Singles ==
#	Title
1.	"Algo Natural"
2.	"Enemigos"
3.	"Si no te has ido vete"

== Personnel ==
Tracks 1 to 7

- Producer: Oscar López
- Arranger: Didi Gutman, Oscar López, Amaury López, Sebastián Krys, Joel Someillian
- Background vocals arranger: Skyler Jet
- Metal arranger: Amaury López
- Recorded at: The Warehouse Recording Studios (Miami, Florida) by John Thomas
- Mixer: David Dachinger, Sebastián Krys, Oscar López

Track 8

- Producers: Oscar López and Juan Carlos Calderón

Tracks 9 to 14

- Producer, arranger and piano player: Juan Carlos Calderón
- Arranger: Jacobo Calderón, Amaury López
- Background vocals: Carlos Murguía, Francis Benitez
- Recorded at: Sunset Studio, Sunset Sound Factory and Capitol
- Mixer: John Thomas and Carlos Santos
- Photographer: Ursula Puga and Gonzalo Morales
- Design: Javier Romero for Design Group

== Musicians ==
Tracks 1 to 8

- Piano: Didi Gutman
- Guitar: David Cabrera
- Bass: John Falcone
- drums: Eloy Polito Sanchez
- Violin: Pedro Alfonso

Tracks 9 to 14

- Drums: Eloy polito Sanchez
- Bass: Lee Sklar
- Electric guitar: Tim Pierce, George Doering.
- keyboards: Pablo Aguirre
- Accordion: Frank Marocco

== Sales and certifications ==
Region	Certification	Certified units/sales
Mexico (AMPROFON)	Gold	75,000^{^}
^{^} Shipments figures based on certification alone.
