= Enorme =

Studio album by Alejandra Guzmán
- Released: 1994
- Recorded: 1994
- Genre: Pop rock
- Label: Sony Music, Ariola

Alejandra Guzmán chronology
...De Piel Negra (1994)	Enorme (1994)	Cambio de Piel (1996)

Enorme (Enormous) is the sixth album by Mexican singer Alejandra Guzmán. It was released in 1994.

== Track listing ==
No.	Title	Writer(s)	Length
1.	"Cuando Dos Van a Muerte"	C. Sanchez; C. Valle
2.	"Pasa la Vida"	C. Sanchez; C. Valle
3.	"Despertar"	C. Sanchez; C. Valle
4.	"Dan Tanto Miedo"	C. Sanchez; C. Valle
5.	"De un Trago"	C. Sanchez; C. Valle
6.	"No Hay Nadie Como Tú"	C. Sanchez; C. Valle
7.	"Baila"	C. Sanchez; C. Valle
8.	"Amigo"	C. Sanchez; C. Valle
9.	"Morir de Amor"	C. Sanchez; C. Valle
10.	"Corazones Rotos"	C. Sanchez; C. Valle

== Singles ==
#	Title
1.	"Pasa la vida"
2.	"Despertar"
3.	"Amigo"
4.	"No hay Nadie Como Tu"

== Sales ==
Region	Certification	Certified units/sales
Mexico	—	100,000
