= Bye Mamá =

Studio album by Alejandra Guzmán
- Released: 1988
- Recorded: 1988
- Genres: Pop rock pop
- Label: Melody
- Producer: Peter Felisatti

Alejandra Guzmán chronology
Bye Mamá (1988)	Dame Tu Amor (1989)

Bye Mamá is the debut album by Mexican rock singer Alejandra Guzmán. It was released in 1988.

The song, "Bye Mamá", is loosely based on Guzmán's childhood. It talks about the star life of her mother, Silvia Pinal, and how she was not there most of the time when she (Guzmán) was growing up. When her mother first heard the song, she was furious at her daughter and did not talk to her for some time. The song "La Plaga" was originally sung by Alejandra's father Enrique Guzmán and is a Spanish cover of "Good Golly Miss Molly".

The song, "Pablo", was dedicated to Guzman's husband at the time.

== Track listing ==
No.	Title	Writer(s)	Length
1.	"La Plaga"	John Marascalco, Robert "Bumps" Blackwell
2.	"Hay Punkies en Moscú"	J.R. Florez, Miguel Blasco, Loris Ceroni
3.	"Bye Mamá"	J.R.Florez-Difelisatti
4.	"Luz De Luna"	J.R. Florez, Miguel Blasco, Loris Ceroni
5.	"Sin Límites"	J.R.Florez-Difelisatti
6.	"Bello Imposible"	Nanini-Piani, Panama Italia
7.	"Buena Onda"	J.R.Florez-Pablo Pinilla
8.	"Pablo"	J.R.Florez-Difelisatti
9.	"En El Calor De La Noche"	J.R.Florez-Difelisatti
10.	"La Gata En El Tejado"	J.R.Florez-Difelisatti

== Singles ==
#	Title
1.	"Bye Mamá"
2.	"Luz De Luna"
3.	"La Plaga"
4.	"Buena Onda"
