= Lipstick (Alejandra Guzmán album) =

Studio album by Alejandra Guzmán
- Released: March 23, 2004
- Genre: Latin Pop, Rock
- Label: RCA; BMG
- Producer: Desmond Child, William Edwards, Jules Gondar

Alejandra Guzmán chronology
Alejandra Guzman En Vivo (2003)	Lipstick (2004)	Indeleble (2006)

Lipstick is the tenth studio album recorded by Mexican singer Alejandra Guzmán. It was released on March 23, 2004 by RCA and BMG U.S. Latin. It was produced by Desmond Child, William Edwards and Jules Gondar.

This album shows a darker image for the singer, leading it to be panned by the critics, and was not as successful as other releases. However, it received two Latin Grammy award nominations for Best Rock Song and Best Rock Solo Performance. It also received a Grammy Nomination for Best Latin Rock/Alternative album, the second American Grammy nomination for the singer and the first since 1992 when her album Flor de Papel was nominated.

The album yielded two singles: "Lipstick" and "Tu Eres Mi Luz".

== Track listing ==
No.	Title	Writer(s)	Length
1.	"Lipstick"	Desmond Child, Lisa Greene, Alejandra Guzmán, Roger Russell, N.C. Thanh, Ernest Newsky, Storm Lee, Jodi Marr	03:13
2.	"Creo En Mí"	Steven Lewinson, Aldo Nova, Peter Lewinson, Cheín García-Alonso, Andreas Carlsson	03:14
3.	"Sálvame"	Desmond Child, Beto Cuevas	03:31
4.	"Hoy Me Voy a Querer"	Alejandra Guzmán, Ximena Muñoz, Desmond Child, Eric Bazilian, Bif Naked, Marlow Rosado	03:39
5.	"Tengo Derecho A Estar Mal"	Alejandra Guzmán, Ximena Muñoz, Betty Wright, Desmond Child, Marlow Rosado, Joss Stone	04:59
6.	"Mundos"	Juan Carlos Pérez Soto, Desmond Child, Jodi Marr	02:50
7.	"Un Juego Más"	Alejandra Guzmán, Ximena Muñoz, Desmond Child, Harry Sommerdahl, Marlow Rosado, Andreas Carlsson	03:43
8.	"Tú Corazón"	Alejandra Guzmán, Ximena Muñoz, Desmond Child, Marlow Rosado, Evan Lowenstein	03:31
9.	"Tu Eres Mi Luz"	Loris Ceroni, Ettore Grenci, Alejandra Guzmán, Ximena Muñoz, Marlow Rosado	03:09
10.	"Supersexitada"	Alejandra Guzmán, Desmond Child, Jodi Marr	03:05
11.	"Lipstick (English Version)"	Lisa Greene, Roger Russell, N.C. Thanh, Ernest Newsky, Storm Lee	03:14

== Singles ==
#	Title
1.	"Lipstick"
2.	"Tu eres mi Luz"
