= Volverte a Amar =

Single by Alejandra Guzmán

from the album Indeleble
- Released: 2006 (Mexico)
- Recorded: 2005
- Genre: Latin Pop
- Length: 3:41
- Label: Sony
- Songwriters: Mario Domm, Alejandra Guzmán

Alejandra Guzmán singles chronology
"Tu Eres Mi Luz" (2004)	"'Volverte a Amar'" (2006)	"Quiero Estar Contigo" (2007)

"Volverte a Amar" (Eng.: Loving You Again) is the first single from Alejandra Guzmán's twelfth studio album Indeleble. The song was produced by Loris Ceroni and written by Mario Domm and Alejandra Guzmán. The song was very successful in Mexico and United States.

In Mexico, the ringtone of this single was certified double-gold. The single also hit #1 there and #6 on the Billboard's Hot Latin Tracks chart (the highest peak for the artist on that chart).

The song received a Latin Grammy Award nomination for Best Rock Song, awarded to Gustavo Cerati.

== Chart performance ==
Chart (2006)	Peak position
Mexican Top 100	1
Billboard Hot Latin Tracks	6

== Certification ==
Region	Certification	Certified units/sales
Mexico (AMPROFON) Ringtone	2× Gold	20,000^{*}
^{*} Sales figures based on certification alone.
