= Quiero Estar Contigo =

Single by Alejandra Guzmán

from the album Indeleble
- Released: 2006 (Mexico)
- Recorded: 2005
- Genre: Latin Pop
- Length: 3:37
- Label: Sony
- Songwriter(s): Mario Domm, Ettore Grenci, Alejandra Guzmán

Alejandra Guzmán singles chronology
"Volverte a Amar" (2006)	"Quiero Estar Contigo" (2006)	"Falso Amor" (2007)

"Quiero Estar Contigo" (Eng.: I Want To Be With You) is the second single of Alejandra Guzmán's twelfth studio album Indeleble. The song was produced by Loris Ceroni and written by Mario Domm, Ettore Grenci and Alejandra Guzmán. The song was not as successful as the singer first single "Volverte a Amar", however it managed to peak within the Top Ten in Mexico, where the ringtone of this single was certified gold.

== Chart performance ==
Chart (2006)	Peak position
Mexico Top 100	4

== Certification ==
Region	Certification	Certified units/sales
Mexico (AMPROFON) Ringtone	Gold	10,000^{*}
^{*} Sales figures based on certification alone.
