= Lipstick (Alejandra Guzmán song) =

Single by Alejandra Guzmán

from the album Lipstick
- Released: 2004 (Mexico)
- Recorded: 2004
- Genre: Latin Pop, Rock
- Length: 3:14
- Label: BMG
- Songwriters: Desmond Child, Lisa Greene, Alejandra Guzman, Roger Russell, N.C. Thanh, Ernest Newsky, Storm Lee, Jodi Marr

Alejandra Guzmán singles chronology
"Quiero Vivir" (2002)	"Lipstick" (2004)	"Tu Eres Mi Luz" (2004)

"Lipstick" is the title of the first single released from the album of the same name by Mexican singer Alejandra Guzmán in 2004. The song was written by Desmond Child, Lisa Greene, Roger Rusell, Ernest Newsky, N.C. Thanh and Storm Lee and translated to Spanish by Alejandra Guzmán and Jodi Marr. The track was also recorded in English and this version is included on the album.

The song was not as successful as any first single from Guzman's albums because presented a very different sound to her music, however with this track, the singer (along with all the songwriters) received a Latin Grammy nomination for Best Rock Song, losing to "Eres" by Café Tacuba.

== Chart performance ==
Chart (2004)	Peak position
Mexican Top 100	12
