= La Guzmán: Primera Fila =

La Guzmán Primera Fila

Live album by Alejandra Guzmán
- Released: December 3, 2013
- Recorded: Estudios Churubusco, Mexico City
- Genre: Latin
- Label: Sony
- Producer: Paul Forat

Alejandra Guzmán chronology
20 Años de Éxitos En Vivo con Moderatto (2011)	La Guzmán Primera Fila (2013)	A + No Poder (2015)

Singles from La Guzmán Primera Fila
- 1. "Mi Peor Error" Released: 2013

La Guzmán: Primera Fila is a live album released by Alejandra Guzmán on December 3, 2013.

== Track listing ==
Standard edition
No.	Title	Writer(s)	Length
1.	"Como Ladrones"	Alejandra Guzmán, Tim Mitchell, Jodi Marr	04:01
2.	"Volveré A Amar"	Desmond Child, Richie Supa, Angie Chirino	03:54
3.	"Quítatelo" (Featuring Beatriz Luengo)	Guzmán, George Noriega, Marr, Beatriz Luengo	03:41
4.	"Yo No Soy De Nadie" (Featuring Fonseca)	Guzmán, José Luis Roma	03:00
5.	"Eternamente Bella"	Gian Pietro Felisatti, J.R. Florez	03:26
6.	"Yo Te Esperaba"	Di Felisatti, Florez, Marella Cayre	03:46
7.	"Aunque Me Mientas" (Featuring Dani Martín)	Guzmán, Luis Fernando Ochoa, Mateo Camargo, Dani Martín	03:19
8.	"Para Mi"	Guzmán, Pablo Preciado	03:48
9.	"Volverte A Amar"	Guzmán, Mario Domm	04:03
10.	"Desde Que Te Fuiste"	Guzmán, Ochoa, Camargo	03:28
11.	"All Along The Watchtower" (Featuring Draco Rosa)	Bob Dylan	03:07
12.	"Mi Peor Error"	Pablo Preciado, Román Torres	04:00
13.	"Hacer Él Amor Con Otro"	Cayre, Consuelo Arango	05:19
14.	"Mírala, Míralo"	Di Felisatti, Florez	04:33
15.	"Libre"	Manuel Mene, César Valle	04:57

Deluxe edition
No.	Title	Writer(s)	Length
16.	"Entre Los Dos"		03:35
17.	"Yo No Soy De Nadie" (Featuring Margarita "La Diosa de la Cumbia")		02:46
18.	"Mi Peor Error [Remix]" (Featuring Yandel)	Preciado, Torres	03:14

DVD (Deluxe edition)
No.	Title	Length
1.	"Como Ladrones"	04:01
2.	"Volveré A Amar"
3.	"Quítatelo" (Featuring Beatriz Luengo)
4.	"Entre Los Dos"	03:35
5.	"Yo No Soy De Nadie" (Featuring Fonseca)
6.	"Eternamente Bella"
7.	"Yo Te Esperaba"
8.	"Aunque Me Mientas" (Featuring Dani Martín)
9.	"Para Mi"
10.	"Volverté A Amar"
11.	"Desde Que Te Fuiste"
12.	"All Along The Watchtower" (Featuring Draco Rosa)
13.	"Mi Peor Error"
14.	"Hacer Él Amor Con Otro"
15.	"Mírala, Míralo"
16.	"Libre"
17.	"Mi Peor Error [Acoustic]"
18.	"Para Mi [Acoustic]"
19.	"Estoy Viva [Acoustic]"

== Singles ==
#	Title
1.	"Mi peor error"
2.	"Aunque me mientas"
3.	"Para mi"

== Tour ==
To support the album, Guzmán launched the "La Guzman 1F Tour", which included dates in the United States, at Los Angeles, Las Vegas, Houston, Miami and Puerto Rico.

== Charts ==
Chart (2014)	Peak position
Mexican Albums (AMPROFON)	1
US Top Latin Albums (Billboard)	6
US Latin Pop Albums (Billboard)	1

== Certification ==
Region	Certification	Certified units/sales
Mexico (AMPROFON)	Platinum+Gold	90,000^{^}
^{^} Shipments figures based on certification alone.
