= Alejandra Guzmán =

Mexican musician (born 1967)

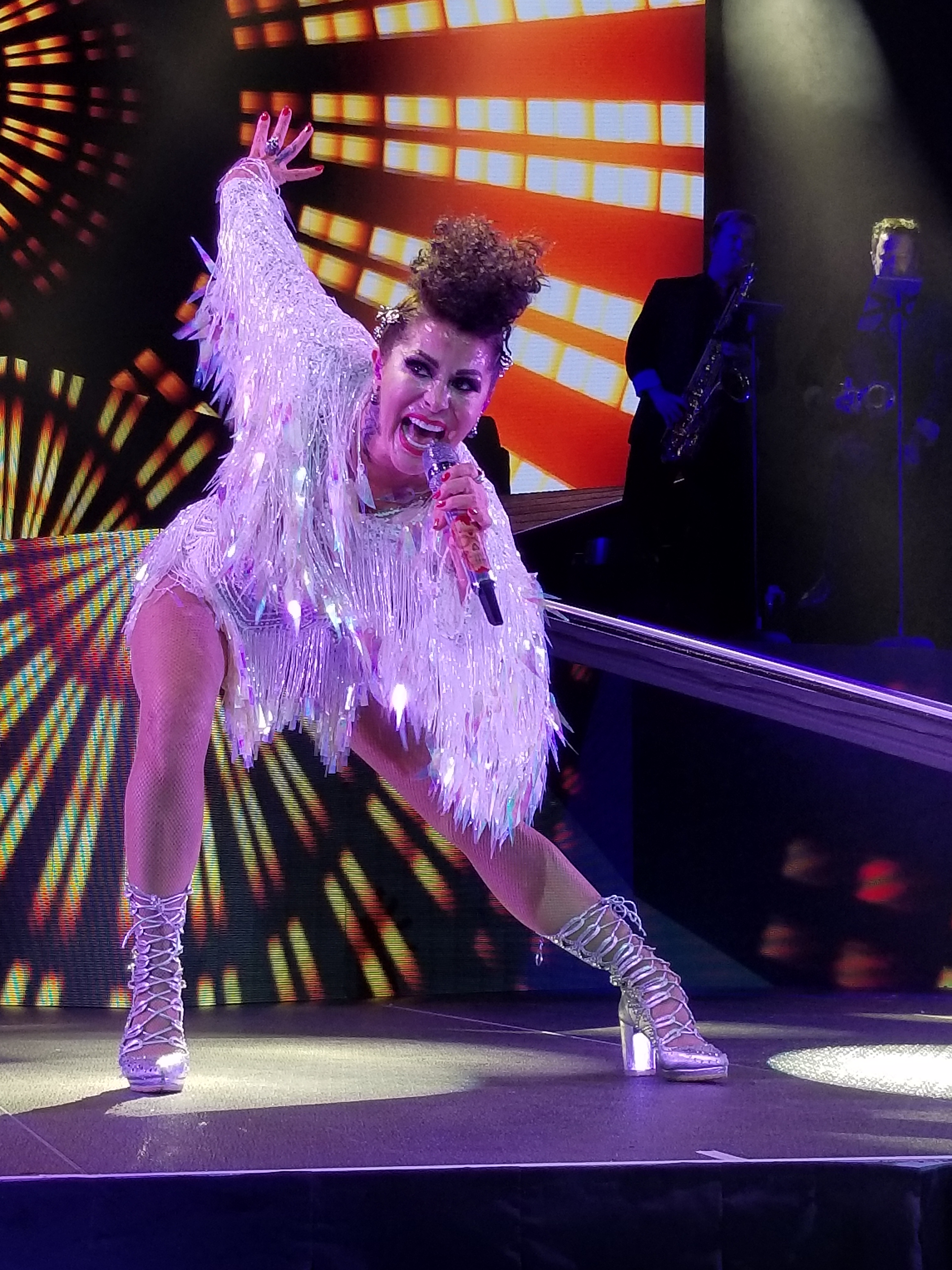
- Guzmán performing during Versus Tour in 2017
- Born: Gabriela Alejandra Guzmán Pinal; 9 February 1968 (age 58); Mexico City, Mexico
- Other names: La Reina del Rock; La Guzmán
- Occupations: Singer; songwriter; actress
- Years active: 1988–present
- Spouse: Farrell Goodman (m. 1998; div. 1998)
- Partner: Pablo Moctezuma (1991–1992)
- Children: Frida Sofía
- Parents: Enrique Guzmán; Silvia Pinal
- Family: Sylvia Pasquel (half-sister); Stephanie Salas (half-niece)
- Musical career
- Genres: Pop; pop rock; rock en español
- Instrument: Vocals
- Labels: Melody; BMG Latin; EMI Televisa; Sony Mexico; Independent
- Website: alejandraguzmanoficial.com

Gabriela Alejandra Guzmán Pinal (born 9 February 1968) is a Mexican pop and rock singer. With more than 30 million records sold throughout her career, winner of a Latin Grammy Award, and nicknamed "La Reina de Corazones" (the Queen of Hearts) and "La Reina del Rock" (the Queen of Rock), she is one of the most successful Mexican female singers. She is also daughter of actress Silvia Pinal and singer Enrique Guzmán.

== Early life ==
Gabriela Alejandra Guzmán Pinal was born February 9, 1968, in Mexico City, to her mother Silvia Pinal's third marriage. Guzmán has three siblings: two older half-sisters, actress Sylvia Pasquel and Viridiana Alatriste. Her younger brother, Luis Enrique Guzmán, is her only sibling from the same father and mother.

Guzmán grew up in the entertainment world, having two superstars as her parents. At age 14, her older sister Viridiana Alatriste died in a car crash, which affected her greatly. After her sister's passing, she became rebellious and determined to enjoy her life to the fullest. She routinely sneaked out of her house to join the vibrant nightlife of Mexico City. During those times, Alejandra met Kenny Aviles from the band Kenny y Los Electricos, who became like a mother to her. It was then that she came to realize she belonged on the stage.

== Career ==
Guzmán began her musical career in 1988 with her first song, Bye Mamá, which she dedicated to her mother. In the 1990s, she released several of her biggest albums like Eternamente Bella, Flor de Piel, as well as Libre which launched with a signed contract to BMG Ariola. Her success placed her in being nominated to a Grammy, Latin Grammy, and her albums to be labeled Gold and Platinum.

Throughout her career, Guzmán has had success throughout Mexico and the United States. She has done duets with Franco De Vita, Mario Domm, Fonseca, and the most known Gloria Trevi. Her along with Trevi had several duets together and did the Versus Tour together from 2017-2018. Guzmán is one of the most prominent female artists of Mexico, and she has been labeled as La Reina del Rock (the Queen of Rock).

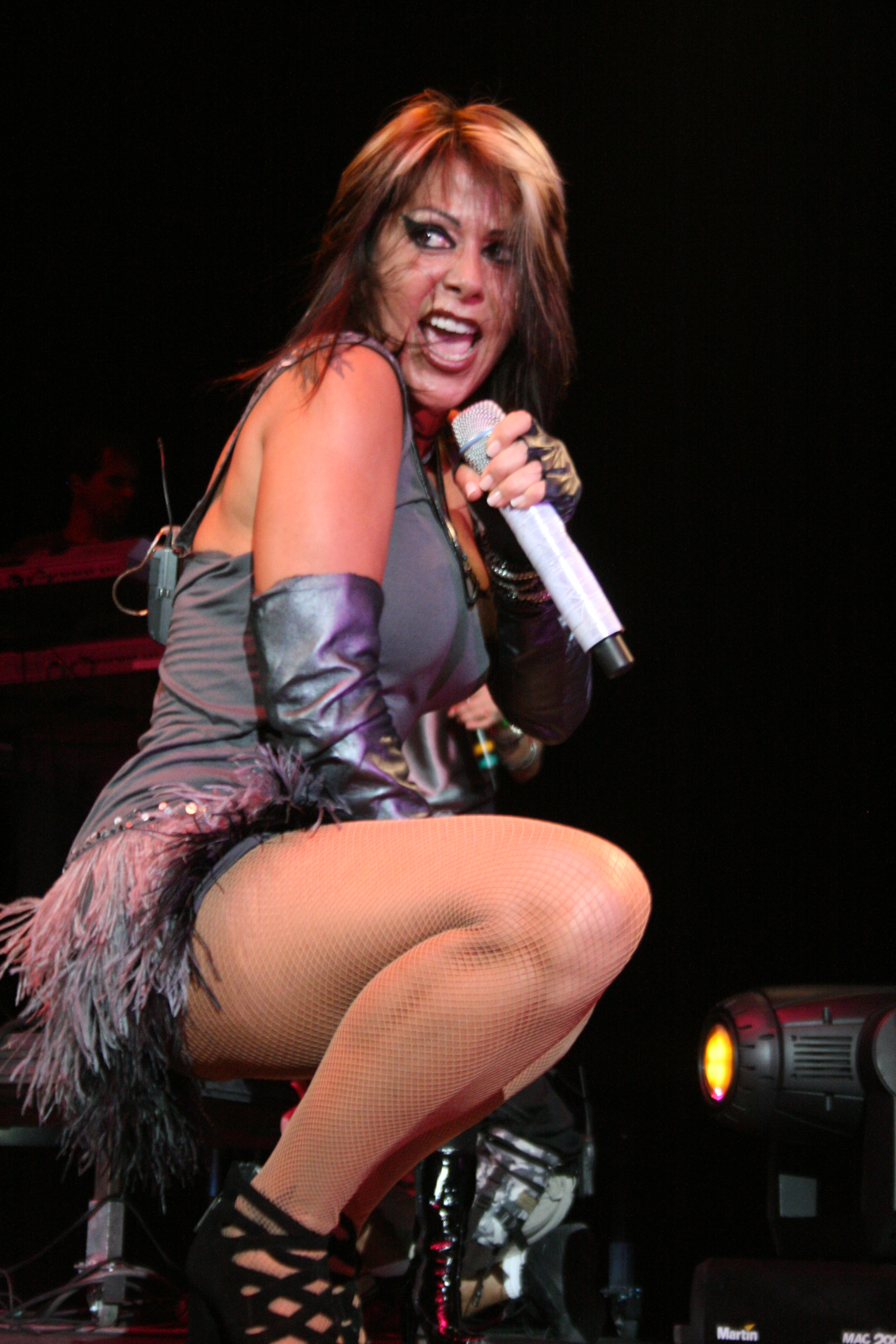
Guzmán performing in 2009

She served as judge of the second season of Va Por Ti. She also served as coach of La Voz...México. On July 5, 2018, Telemundo announced Alejandra Guzmán as a coach on La Voz (U.S.). Guzmán joined Luis Fonsi, Carlos Vives and Wisin as coaches on the Spanish-language version of NBC singing-competition The Voice. In 2020, Amazon announced her starring role in the Amazon Prime series "El juego de las llaves".

In 2021, she joined the cast of the second season of the Amazon Prime Video series El Juego de las Llaves created by Marisa Quiroga, and produced by Amazon Studios, Corazón Films, and Pantaya. Guzmán was also a featured performer on the American music TV series A Tiny Audience produced by February Entertainment. for HBO Max and aired in Latin America by DirecTV Latam.

In 2022, Guzmán appeared in the premiere episode of the music-TV show ¡LaNoche!, produced by February Entertainment and aired in the US, alongside Paulina Rubio. It was the first time the two artists shared a stage. The show included cameos by their mothers, Mexican actresses Silvia Pinal and Susana Dosamantes. In 2022 Alejandra Guzmán and Paulina Rubio embarked on a 20-city US tour. The PERRÍSIMAS US TOUR 2022 kicked off in April 2022, and included major cities such as Chicago, El Paso, New York, Miami, and Las Vegas, before wrapping up on May 22 in Los Angeles. In July 2022, La Guzmán kicked off her TUYA TOUR with a sold-out show at the Arena CDMX. She was joined by special guests Silvia Pinal, Fey, Erik Rubín, and Aleks Syntek. In November 2022, Guzmán performed a series of concerts at the Venetian Las Vegas.

== Personal life ==
Alejandra Guzmán has had several relationships throughout her life. Her first public relationship was with Erik Rubin which did not last long due to conflict with Mexican singer Paulina Rubio over him. She later started a relationship with Pablo Moctezuma, a businessman with whom Guzmán has a daughter, Frida Sofía, born March 1992. She and Moctezuma later separated.

Guzmán married American businessman Farrell Goodman in 1998. The marriage was destroyed right after, when Goodman was arrested due to carrying narcotics in an airport in Germany. Her last public relationship to date was a little after her divorce from Goodman, with Gerardo Gómez de la Borbolla. They initially had a great relationship but things ended after she suffered a miscarriage and fell into a deep depression, during which time he also wanted to be part of her work team as well as launching a singing career of his own. Alejandra revealed years later that she ended up having an abortion from a second pregnancy with him.

In 2007 she was diagnosed with breast cancer and was able to survive due to early detection. In 2009 Alejandra almost died a few months after she had butt enhancement injections from unlicensed estheticians. She was injected with polymers which caused infections and for several years she has had over 30 surgical procedures to remove them from her body.

Since 2020 Guzmán and her daughter Frída Sofía have been estranged. In 2021 Frída Sofía caused a huge scandal by asserting that Guzmán's father Enrique had sexually molested her since she was 5. Guzmán has sided fully with her father, who denies the accusations and has stated she hopes this will be solved soon enough.

== Discography ==
=== Studio albums ===
- Bye Mamá (1988)
- Dame Tu Amor (1989)
- Eternamente Bella (1990)
- Flor de Papel (1991)
- Libre (1993)
- Enorme (1994)
- Cambio de Piel (1996)
- Algo Natural (1999)
- Soy (2001)
- Lipstick (2004)
- Indeleble (2006)
- Fuerza (2007)
- Único (2009)
- A + No Poder (2015)
- Versus (with Gloria Trevi) (2017)

=== Compilation albums ===
- Reina de Corazones
- 15 Éxitos
- Fuerza (Spanish edition)

=== Live albums ===
- La Guzmán
- Alejandra Guzman En Vivo
- 20 Años de Éxitos En Vivo con Moderatto
- La Guzmán: Primera Fila
- La Guzmán Live at the Roxy

=== Singles ===
Year	Single	Chart positions	
Year	Single	U.S. Hot Latin Songs	U.S. Latin Pop Airplay
1990	"Eternamente Bella"	20	-
1991	"Cuidado con el Corazón"	18	-
1991	"Rosas Rojas"	36	-
1991	"Reina de Corazones"	27	-
1991	"Hacer el Amor con Otro"	16	-
1991	"Hey Güera"	-	-
1993	"Mala Hierba"	10	-
1993	"Mírala, Míralo"		
1995	"Despertar"	23	7
1995	"Morir de Amor"	-	14
2001	"De Verdad"	22	10
2002	"Volveré a Amar"	-	31
2004	"Lipstick"	-	-
2004	"Tú Eres Mi Luz"	-	-
2006	"Volverte a Amar"	6	1
2006	"Quiero Estar Contigo"	-	27
2007	"Soy Sólo Un Secreto"	12	3
2007	"Mírame"	-	-
2010	"Día de Suerte"	-	-
2010	"Que Cante la Vida"	-	-
2011	"Tan Sólo Tú" (Franco De Vita feat. Alejandra Guzmán)	14	3
2011	"Un Grito En La Noche" (feat. Moderatto)	-	-
2013	"Mi Peor Error"	12	
2014	"Aunque Me Mientas" (feat. Dani Martín)		
2014	"Para mí"	49	
2014	"Entre los dos"	-	
2015	"Adiós" (feat. Farruko)	26	
2015	"Qué Ironía"	-	
2016	"Esta Noche"	-	
2017	"Te Juro" (Samo feat. Alejandra Guzmán)		
2017	"Cuando Un Hombre Te Enamora" (feat. Gloria Trevi)	-	
2017	"Más Buena" (feat. Gloria Trevi)	-	
2018	"Soy Así"	-	
2018	"Así es la Navidad"	-	
2019	"Mi Enfermedad"	16	
2019	"Oye Mi Amor"	12	
2020	"Vive y Deja Vivir" (feat. Ñengo Flow)		
2021	"Lado Oscuro"		
2021	"Primera y Última Vez"		
2021	"Quiero Más de Ti"		
2022	"Sexo Pudor y Lágrimas"		
2022	"TUYA"		
2023	"Reynisima"		
2023	"Milagros"		
2023	"Ojalá Que Te Mueras" (Grupo Pesado feat. Alejandra Guzmán)		
2024	"Nueve Vidas"		
Total number-one hits		-	1

== Tours ==
- Dame Tu Amor Tour (1990)
- Eternamente Bella Tour (1991)
- Flor de Papel Tour (1992)
- Libre Tour (1993–1994)
- Enorme Tour (1995–1996)
- Cambio de Piel Tour (1997)
- La Guzman Tour (1998)
- Algo Natural Tour (1999-2000)
- Soy Tour (2002)
- Supersexitada Tour (2004–2005)
- Indeble (2006–2007)
- Fuerza Tour (2008–2009)
- Unico Tour (2010)
- 20 Años de Éxitos Tour (2011–2012)
- La Guzman Primera Fila Tour (2013–2014)
- Rock Recargado Tour (2015)
- A + No Poder Tour (2016)
- Versus Tour (2017–2018)
- La Guzmán Tour (2019–2020)
- Perrísimas US Tour (2022) (with Paulina Rubio)
- Eternas Tour (2023) (with Fey) (Cancelled)
- Reynisima Tour (2023–2024)
- Brilla Tour (2024–2026)
- Los que nos quedamos Tour (2026-)

== Awards won ==
- Latin Grammy 2002: "Best Rock Solo Album" (Soy)
- Winner of ASCAP Latin Award: Pop Balad: "Volverte a Amar" (2006) / "Soy sólo un Secreto" (2009) / "Día de Suerte' (2012)
- "La Luna" Del Auditorio Nacional" Award: Best Live Latin Rock Performance
- Premio Oye! 2006: " Album of the Year" and "Best Female Artist"
- Premios Juventud 2010: Best Rock Artist
- Premios Juventud 2012: Mejor Tema Novelero "Día de Suerte"

Honorary Award

- 2013 PADRES Contra el Cancer (I Am Hope)

La Musa Award 2015 Latin songwriter

== Nominations ==
Grammy Awards

- 1991 "Best Latin Pop Album" for the album "Flor de papel"; 2004 "Latin Rock / Alternative album" for "Lipstick"

Latin Grammy Awards

- 2000 "Best Female Rock Vocal Performance" for the song "Algo Natural"; 2005 "Best Rock Solo album" for "Lipstick" and "Best Rock song" for "Lipstick"; 2006 "Best Rock Vocal album" for "Indeleble" and "Best Rock Song" for "Volverte a Amar"; 2008 "Best Female Pop Vocal Album" for "Fuerza"; 2011 "Record of the Year"/ "Best Short Form Music Video" for Tan Solo Tu (A Duo with Franco de Vita)
- Billboard Latin Music Awards; 2005 "Latin Rock / Alternative album of the year" for "Lipstick"

Premio Lo Nuestro

- 2007 "Artist of the year" / "Album of the year" for "Indeleble" / "Song of the year" for "Volverte a amar"; 2008 /"Female Artist of the Year" / "Album of the Year" for "Fuerza", "Song of the Year" for "Soy solo un Secreto"; 2012 "Rock Album of the Year" for "20 Años de Éxitos en Vivo con Moderatto"/ "Rock Artist of the Year"/ "Rock Song of the Year" for "Día de Suerte"/ "Collaboration of the Year" for "Día de Suerte" with Moderatto; 2013 "Artist of the year"

Premios Juventud

- 2011 "My Rock Artist"
