= Flor de Papel =

Studio album by Alejandra Guzmán
- Released: 1991
- Recorded: 1991
- Genre: Pop rock, pop
- Label: Fonovisa/Universal Music
- Producer: Miguel Blasco

Alejandra Guzmán chronology
Eternamente Bella (1990)	Flor de Papel (1991)	Libre (1993)

Flor de Papel (Paper Flower) is the fourth album by Mexican rock singer Alejandra Guzmán. It was released in 1991 and became one of the most important female albums in Mexico. It won the Eres Award for Album of the Year and received a nomination for a Grammy Award for Best Latin Pop Album. The album title comes from a lyric in the song "Rosas Rojas".

== Track listing ==
No.	Title	Writer(s)	Length
1.	"Provocación"	C. Valle; J.R. Florez	03:33
2.	"Quiero Armar Un Escándalo"	Di Felisatti; J.R. Florez	03:28
3.	"Hacer Él Amor Con Otro"	Gian Pietro Felisatti; José Vaca Flores	04:42
4.	"Hey Güera"	Di Felisatti; J.R. Florez	03:58
5.	"La Ciudad Ardió"	C. Valle; J.R. Florez	03:53
6.	"Reina De Corazónes"	C. Valle; J.R. Florez	03:25
7.	"Vivir Contra Corriente"	Di Felisatti; J.R. Florez	03:42
8.	"Rosas Rojas"	C. Valle; J.R. Florez	05:05
9.	"Me Cuesta Mucho Amarte"	Di Felisatti; J.R. Florez	04:34
10.	"Dame Un Martillo"	Di Felisatti; J.R. Florez; Miguel Blasco	02:47
