= Fuerza =

Studio album by Alejandra Guzmán
- Released: November 27, 2007
- Genre: Pop
- Label: EMI
- Producer: Loris Ceroni

Alejandra Guzmán chronology
Reina de Corazones (2007)	Fuerza (2007)	Único (2009)

Fuerza (English: Strength) is the Latin Grammy nominated twelfth studio album released by Mexican singer Alejandra Guzmán. It was released on November 26, 2007. The first single released was "Soy Sólo Un Secreto".

== Album history ==
According to bloggarte.com the album was supposed to be released on December 4, 2007 but it was ultimately changed for a November release. About the track "Hasta el Final" ("Until the End") was written by the singer herself after a breast cancer operation, and is dedicated to her daughter Frida Sofía.

"I wrote it for my daughter at the hospital, it's a very pretty song about hope, faith, not looking back, don't stop loving and the things I am feeling"

.

In the album will be rock, ballad and guzmanism!!. Some tracks included are: "Todo", "Por un Momento", "Bellísima", "Un Buen Día" and "Diosa Seducción".

The album is produced once again by Loris Ceroni (who produced before artists like Fey, Natalia Lafourcade and Laura Pausini. 13 tracks were selected including songs written by José Luis Pagán, Mario Domm and the singer herself. The album was released in Mexico and Latinamerica and later in the United States and Spain.

On September 10, 2008 this album received a Latin Grammy nomination for Best Female Pop Vocal Performance, but lost to Cualquier Día by Kany García.

In 2008, Fuerza was released by Sony BMG in Spain like a compilation album with a different track list.

== Track listing ==
=== Standard edition ===
No.	Title	Writer(s)	Length
1.	"Por Un Momento"	Mario Domm, Alejandra Guzmán	03:32
2.	"Soy Sólo Un Secreto"	Alejandra Guzmán, José Luis Pagán	04:09
3.	"Hasta el Final"	Mario Domm, Alejandra Guzmán	03:38
4.	"Todo"	Oscar Schwebel, Francesco de Bendetti, Davide Esposito, Maximiliano Corona	03:44
5.	"Nada es Como Es"	Alejandra Guzmán, Cristian Zalles	04:31
6.	"Mírame"	Salvador Rizzo, Jaime Ciero	02:56
7.	"Quiero Ser"	Alejandra Guzmán, Karenka, Gianluigi Fazio	04:10
8.	"Un Buen Día"	Reyli Barba, Rafael Esparza	03:56
9.	"Bellísima"	Alejandra Guzmán, Oscar Schwebel	03:30
10.	"Diosa Seducción"	Cocetta Constanzo	03:16
11.	"Siempre Tú (Dark Side of the Moon)"	Linda Perry, Goapele Mohlabanne, Alejandra Guzmán, José Luis Pagán	03:44
12.	"Hasta el Final (Acustic)"	Mario Domm, Alejandra Guzmán	03:32

=== Spanish edition ===
No.	Title	Writer(s)	Length
1.	"Soy Sólo Un Secreto"	Alejandra Guzmán, José Luis Pagán	04:09
2.	"Hasta El Final"	Mario Domm, Alejandra Guzmán	03:38
3.	"Diablo"	Alejandra Guzmán, Jordi Marr, Randy Cantor
4.	"Volverte A Amar"	Alejandra Guzmán, Mario Domm
5.	"Toda La Mitad"	Pancho Varona, F. Bastante, Antonio G. de Diego
6.	"Loca"	Myra Stella Turner
7.	"Guerra Fría"	Carlos A. Dávila, Juan Antonio Castillo
8.	"Necesito Amarme"	Mario Domm, Alejandra Guzmán
9.	"De Verdad"	Julia Sierra, Jordi Marr, Steve Mandile
10.	"Quiero Estar Contigo"	Mario Domm, Alejandra Guzmán
11.	"Lipstick"	Ernest Newsky, Lisa Greene, NC Thanh, R. Russell, Storm Lee
12.	"Tú Eres Mi Luz"	Loris Ceroni, Ettore Grenci
13.	"La Plaga"	Blackwell, Marascalco

== Singles ==
#	Title
1.	"Soy solo un secreto"
2.	"Hasta el final"
3.	"Mirame"

== Chart performance ==
The album debuted at number 13 on the Mexican Top 100 by AMPROFON, climbing to number 12 and later to number 8 in the week from December 10–16, 2007, and in United States debuted at number 53 on the Billboard Top Latin Albums and at number 37 on the Top Heatseekers survey.

== Charts ==
Chart (2007)	Peak position
Mexico Top 100	8
U.S. Billboard Top Heatseekers	37
U.S. Billboard Top Latin Albums	53
U.S. Billboard Latin Pop Albums	16

== Sales and certifications ==
Region	Certification	Certified units/sales
Mexico (AMPROFON)	Platinum	100,000^{^}
^{^} Shipments figures based on certification alone.

== Personnel ==
- Producer: Loris Ceroni
- Co-Producer: Alejandra Guzmán
- Recorder and mixer: Loris Ceroni at Le Dune Recording Studio, Riolo Terme, Italy
- Mastering: Mike Marsh at The Exchange Mastering, London
- Photography: Enrique Covarrubias
- Design: micro www.unmirador.com

== Musicians ==
- Drums: Cristiano Micalizzi and Diego Sapignoli
- Percussion and bass: Loris Ceroni
- Guitars and accordion: Dario Giovanini
- Piano and string arrangements : Mario Neri
- Background vocals: Emanuela Cortesi, Gigi Fazio, Conceta Constanzo
