= Soy (Alejandra Guzmán album) =

2001 studio album by Alejandra Guzmán

Studio album by Alejandra Guzmán
- Released: 2001
- Genre: Latin pop

Alejandra Guzmán chronology
| Algo Natural (1999) | Soy (2001) | Lipstick (2004) |

Singles from Soy
- 1. "De Verdad"; 2. "Diablo"; 3. "Quiero Vivir"; 4. "Volveré a Amar"

Soy (transl. "I Am") is the ninth studio album by Mexican singer Alejandra Guzmán. This album was the first produced by Desmond Child, Randy Cantor and was the winner of the 2002 Latin Grammy Award for "Best Rock Solo Vocal Album", being the first win and, to date, the only Latin Grammy won by the singer.

The album yielded four singles: "De Verdad", "Diablo", "Volveré a Amar" and the Robbie Williams's original "Quiero Vivir". The track "Vagabundo Corazón" features Joe Perry and Steven Tyler from the rock band Aerosmith. The last track, "Labios de Fuego" was featured on the soundtrack of the Mexican film Dame Tu Cuerpo.

Soy was certified gold in Mexico.

== Track listing ==
| No. | Title | Writer(s) | Length |
|---|---|---|---|
| 1. | "Diablo" | Alejandra Guzmán, Randy Cantor, Jodi Marr | 03:26 |
| 2. | "De Verdad" | Steve Mandle, Julia Sierra, Jodi Marr | 03:21 |
| 3. | "Quiero Vivir" | Robbie Williams, Desmond Child, Eric Bazilian | 03:45 |
| 4. | "Volveré a Amar" | Desmond Child, Richie Supa | 03:52 |
| 5. | "Caramelo" | Elsten Torres | 03:17 |
| 6. | "Todo" | Desmond Child, Gary Burr, Johnny Lang | 03:58 |
| 7. | "Vagabundo Corazón" | Desmond Child, Randy Cantor, Wayne Hector | 04:15 |
| 8. | "Soy Tú Lluvia" | Joe Perry, Desmond Child, Steven Tyler, Fernando Osorio, Alejandra Guzmán | 04:43 |
| 9. | "Abrázame" | Juan Carlos Soto, Jodi Marr | 02:54 |
| 10. | "Labios De Fuego" | Lucresia Garx, Reyli Barba | 03:48 |

== Singles ==
| # | Title |
|---|---|
| 1. | "De Verdad" |
| 2. | "Diablo" |
| 3. | "Volvere a Amar" |

== Sales and certifications ==
| Region | Certification | Certified units/sales |
|---|---|---|
| Mexico (AMPROFON) | Gold | 75,000^{^} |
^{^} Shipments figures based on certification alone.
