= List of number-one songs from 1989 to 2005 (Panama) =

This is a list of the number-one songs from 1983 to 2009 in Panama. The charts are compiled by United Press International (from 1983 to 1996), Notimex (from 1998 to 2005) and EFE (from 2008 to 2010).

== 1983 ==
Date	Single	Artist	Ref.
July 23	"Como Tú"	Basilio	

== 1984 ==
Date	Single	Artist	Ref.
October 26	"I Just Called to Say I Love You"	Stevie Wonder	
November 23	"Ladrón de tu amor"	Gualberto Ibarreto	
November 30	"Voy a conquistarte"	José Luis Rodríguez	
December 7	"Voy a conquistarte"	José Luis Rodríguez	

== 1985 ==
Date	Single	Artist	Ref.
January 18	"Perdidos en París"	José Luis Rodríguez	
January 25	"Perdidos en París"	José Luis Rodríguez	
February 1	"Pobre diablo"	Emmanuel	
February 8	"Like a Virgin"	Madonna	
March 15	"Toda la luz"	Guillermo Dávila	
March 29	"Palabra de honor"	Luis Miguel	
April 5	"Amante bandido"	Miguel Bosé	
April 12	"Amante bandido"	Miguel Bosé	
April 26	"Material Girl"	Madonna	
May 24	"We Are the World"	USA for Africa	
May 31	"The Heat Is On"	Glenn Frey	
June 7	"Camionero"	Roberto Carlos	
June 21	"Sussudio"	Phil Collins	
June 28	"Crazy for You"	Madonna	
July 5	"Sussudio"	Phil Collins	
July 19	"Axel F"	Harold Faltermeyer	
July 26	"Patacón pisao"	Johnny Ventura	
August 2	"Angel"	Madonna	
August 9	"Tú con él"	Los Iracundos	
August 16	"María de la esperanza"	Juan Gabriel	
August 30	"Caribe"	Angela Carrasco and Willy Chirino	
September 20	"Alguien como tú"	Angela Carrasco	
September 27	"Just as I Am"	Air Supply	
October 4	"Conga"	Miami Sound Machine	
October 25	"Al ritmo de la noche"	Sophy	
November 8	"Por ella"	José Feliciano and José José	
November 22	"Don't Lose My Number"	Phil Collins	
December 20	"Felicidades"	Julio Iglesias and Pedro Vargas	

== 1986 ==
Date	Single	Artist	Ref.
January 3	"We Are the World"	USA for Africa	
January 17	"Ven o Voy"	Camilo Sesto	
January 24	"¿Cómo te va mi amor?"	Pandora	
March 14	"¿Cómo te va mi amor?"	Pandora	
April 11	"Lobo"	Dulce	
May 2	"Lobo"	Dulce	
May 16	"Se nos rompió el amor"	Rocío Jurado	
June 6	"Símbolo sexual"	Roberto Carlos	
June 13	"Enamorándome más de ti"	Guillermo Dávila	
June 27	"Greatest Love of All"	Whitney Houston	
July 11	"Juego abierto"	Guillermo Dávila	
July 18	"Pájaro que comió, voló"	Diego Verdaguer	
July 25	"Tú me quemas"	Luis Angel	
August 1	"Me tendrás que perdonar"	Henry Gorgona	
August 8	"Juego abierto"	Guillermo Dávila	
August 22	"Glory of Love"	Peter Cetera	
August 29	"Papa Don't Preach"	Madonna	
September 5	"Papa Don't Preach"	Madonna	
September 19	"Tou lumin (amba-amba)"	Grupo D.P. Express	
September 26	"Dancing on the Ceiling"	Lionel Richie	
October 10	"Typical Male"	Tina Turner	
October 24	"Toda la vida"	Emmanuel and Franco	

== 1987 ==
Date	Single	Artist	Ref.
May 15	"¿Quién es usted?"	Antonieta	
June 5	"¿Es ella más que yo?"	Yuri	
July 10	"Quiero llenarte"	Frankie Ruiz	
July 24	"Lo Mejor de Tu Vida"	Julio Iglesias	
July 31	"Lo Mejor de Tu Vida"	Julio Iglesias	
August 14	"Lo Mejor de Tu Vida"	Julio Iglesias	
September 11	"Tu Cárcel"	Los Bukis	
September 25	"La Bamba"	Los Lobos	

== 1988 ==
Date	Single	Artist	Ref.
January 1	"I Think We're Alone Now"	Tiffany	
January 29	"Corre, corre"	Flans	
March 11	"La pastilla del amor"	La Banda	
March 25	"Lluvia"	Eddie Santiago	
April 15	"Todo empezó"	Eddie Santiago	
April 29	"Sólo importas tú"	Camilo Azuquita	
May 20	"Presiento"	Carlos Mata	
August 5	"Circle in the Sand"	Belinda Carlisle	
September 2	"Amigos"	Johnny Ventura and Basilio	

== 1989 ==
Date	Single	Artist	Ref.
January 27	"El Cucú"	Wilfrido Vargas	
April 7	"Como Tu Mujer"	Rocío Durcal	
July 14	"Baila Mi Rumba"	José Luis Rodríguez	
August 11	"Aquel Viejo Motel"	David Pabón	
September 8	"Mi corazón tiene mente propia"	Ednita Nazario	

== 1990 ==
Date	Single	Artist	Ref.
June 8	"Como Abeja al Panal"	Juan Luis Guerra	
June 15	"Como Abeja al Panal"	Juan Luis Guerra	
July 13	"Como Abeja al Panal"	Juan Luis Guerra	

== 1991 ==
Date	Single	Artist	Ref.
January 11	"El tribunal del amor"	Braulio	
January 25	"El tribunal del amor"	Braulio	
February 1	"El tribunal del amor"	Braulio	
February 8	"El tribunal del amor"	Braulio	
February 15	"Madera Fina"	Yordano	
March 8	"Madera Fina"	Yordano	
June 14	"Hacer el amor con otro"	Alejandra Guzmán	
June 21	"Hacer el amor con otro"	Alejandra Guzmán	
June 28	"No Basta"	Franco de Vita	
July 5	"Es por tí"	Cómplices	
July 12	"Es por tí"	Cómplices	
August 2	"Déjame Llorar"	Ricardo Montaner	
August 9	"Déjame Llorar"	Ricardo Montaner	
August 30	"Detalles"	Oscar D'León	
September 6	"Cosas del Amor"	Vicki Carr and Ana Gabriel	
September 20	"Mesita de noche"	Víctor Víctor	
October 11	"Electricidad"	Lucero	
October 18	"Rosas rojas"	Alejandra Guzmán	
November 1	"Mambo"	Azucar Moreno	
November 8	"Theme from Dying Young"	Kenny G	
November 15	"Amor Mío, ¿Qué Me Has Hecho?"	Camilo Sesto	
November 22	"Amor Mío, ¿Qué Me Has Hecho?"	Camilo Sesto	
December 20	"Para Siempre"	Magneto	

== 1992 ==
Date	Single	Artist	Ref.
January 3	"Amor Mío, ¿Qué Me Has Hecho?"	Camilo Sesto	
January 10	"Para Siempre"	Magneto	
January 17	"Chindolele"	Xuxa	
January 24	"Fuego Contra Fuego"	Ricky Martin	
February 7	"Si Esto No es Amor"	H2O	
February 21	"Si Esto No es Amor"	H2O	
March 13	"Sola"	Lourdes Robles	
March 20	"Aguanta Corazón"	José Augusto	
March 27	"No Se Tú"	Luis Miguel	
April 3	"No Se Tú"	Luis Miguel	
April 10	"No Se Tú"	Luis Miguel	
April 17	"No Se Tú"	Luis Miguel	
April 24	"No Se Tú"	Luis Miguel	
May 1	"No Se Tú"	Luis Miguel	
May 22	"Locos de remate"	Proyecto M	
June 12	"Locos de remate"	Proyecto M	
July 3	"Otro día más sin verte"	Jon Secada	
July 10	"Milonga sentimental"	Julio Iglesias	
August 14	"Otro día más sin verte"	Jon Secada	
August 28	"Otro día más sin verte"	Jon Secada	
September 4	"El centro de mi corazón"	Chayanne	
September 11	"Otro día más sin verte"	Jon Secada	
October 16	"Angel"	Jon Secada	
October 30	"Reza por mí"	Magneto	
November 6	"Mío"	Paulina Rubio	
November 13	"Mío"	Paulina Rubio	
November 27	"Mío"	Paulina Rubio	
December 18	"Éxtasis"	Chayanne	
December 25	"Éxtasis"	Chayanne	

== 1993 ==
Date	Single	Artist	Ref.
January 22	"I Will Always Love You"	Whitney Houston	
January 29	"I Will Always Love You"	Whitney Houston	
March 5	"I Will Always Love You"	Whitney Houston	
March 19	"Quien Diría"	Ricardo Arjona	
March 26	"Se Me Fue"	Myriam Hernández	
April 2	"Se Me Fue"	Myriam Hernández	
April 16	"Se Me Fue"	Myriam Hernández	
May 21	"Si Ella Supiera"	Julián	
May 28	"No me puedes pedir"	Irma	
June 4	"Si Ella Supiera"	Julián	
June 11	"Por amarte tanto"	Guillermo Dávila	
July 9	"Mírame a los ojos"	Carlos Mata	
July 16	"Mírame a los ojos"	Carlos Mata	
July 23	"Ayer"	Luis Miguel	
August 20	"Primera Vez"	Ricardo Arjona	
August 27	"Vivir Sin Aire"	Maná	
October 1	"Nunca Voy a Olvidarte"	Cristian Castro	
October 8	"Dreamlover"	Mariah Carey	
October 15	"Dreamlover"	Mariah Carey	
October 22	"Mi amada"	Magneto	
November 26	"Lluvia de besos"	Bachata Magic	
December 3	"Hasta Que Me Olvides"	Luis Miguel	
December 10	"El amor no se puede olvidar"	Pimpinela	

== 1994 ==
Date	Single	Artist	Ref.
January 7	"Fe"	Jorge González	
January 14	"Fe"	Jorge González	
February 4	"Cerca de Ti"	Barrio Boyzz	
February 11	"Detrás de Mi Ventana"	Yuri	
February 25	"Detrás de Mi Ventana"	Yuri	
March 4	"Si no estás conmigo"	Proyecto M	
March 18	"Si no estás conmigo"	Proyecto M	
April 15	"Ángel Caído"	Álvaro Torres	
April 22	"A pesar del tiempo"	Yolandita Monge	
April 29	"A pesar del tiempo"	Yolandita Monge	
May 6	"Vida"	La Mafia	
May 20	"Vida"	La Mafia	
May 27	"A pesar del tiempo"	Yolandita Monge	
June 3	"A pesar del tiempo"	Yolandita Monge	
June 10	"A pesar del tiempo"	Yolandita Monge	
June 17	"Te Amaré"	Barrio Boyzz	
July 8	"Te Amaré"	Barrio Boyzz	
July 15	"If You Go"	Jon Secada	
July 22	"If You Go"	Jon Secada	
July 29	"Quisiera"	Ricardo Montaner	
August 5	"Quisiera"	Ricardo Montaner	
August 12	"Quisiera"	Ricardo Montaner	
August 26	"Can You Feel the Love Tonight"	Elton John	
September 2	"Pero Qué Necesidad"	Juan Gabriel	
September 16	"Pero Qué Necesidad"	Juan Gabriel	
September 23	"Pero Qué Necesidad"	Juan Gabriel	
September 30	"Que sabes tú"	Daniela Romo	
October 7	"El día que me quieras"	Luis Miguel	
October 14	"Vive en mí"	Mijares	
October 21	"Vive en mí"	Mijares	
October 28	"Amor mío"	Menudo	
November 4	"La soledad"	Laura Pausini	
November 11	"El testamento"	Carlos Vives	
November 18	"La soledad"	Laura Pausini	
November 25	"Mañana"	Cristian Castro	
December 2	"Grandeza mexicana"	José José	
December 16	"Débil del alma"	Lourdes Robles	
December 23	"Siempre te amaré"	Sergio Blass	

== 1995 ==
Date	Single	Artist	Ref.
January 27	"Hold Me, Thrill Me, Kiss Me"	Gloria Estefan	
February 24	"Amores extraños"	Laura Pausini	
March 17	"La Media Vuelta"	Luis Miguel	
March 24	"La Media Vuelta"	Luis Miguel	
March 31	"La Media Vuelta"	Luis Miguel	
April 14	"Todo y Nada"	Luis Miguel	
April 21	"Muriendo de Amor"	Juan Gabriel	
April 28	"Muriendo de Amor"	Juan Gabriel	
May 12	"Se fue"	Laura Pausini	
June 9	"Mal Herido"	Magneto	
June 16	"Hey Jude"	Various artists	
July 14	"No hace falta más que dos"	Myriam Hernández	
July 28	"Una Mujer Como Tú"	Los Bukis	
August 4	"Una Mujer Como Tú"	Los Bukis	
August 11	"Morelia"	Cristian Castro	
August 18	"Morelia"	Cristian Castro	
September 22	"Ven junto a mí"	Claudio Bermúdez	
October 6	"De qué te vale fingir"	Yuri	
October 13	"De qué te vale fingir"	Yuri	
December 8	"Si nos dejan"	Luis Miguel	

== 1996 ==
Date	Single	Artist	Ref.
January 19	"Si Tú Te Vas"	Enrique Iglesias	
February 9	"Quién"	Pedro Fernández	
March 1	"Si me quieres matar"	Braulio	
March 15	"Verás"	Madonna	
May 17	"Because You Loved Me"	Celine Dion	
October 29	"¿Dónde Estás Corazón?"	Shakira	
November 26	"Inolvidable"	Laura Pausini	

== 1998 ==
Date	Single	Artist	Ref.
March 22	"Si te vas"	Soraya	
April 5	"No Sé Olvidar"	Alejandro Fernández	
April 12	"Melancolías"	Charlie Zaa	
May 3	"Amiga Mía"	Alejandro Sanz	
May 10	"Amiga Mía"	Alejandro Sanz	
May 31	"¿Y tú cómo estás?"	Yuri	
June 14	"El silencio de la espera"	Andrea Bocelli	
June 28	"Amiga Mía"	Alejandro Sanz	
July 12	"La copa de la vida"	Ricky Martin	
July 19	"Lloran Las Rosas"	Cristian Castro	
July 26	"Yo Nací Para Amarte"	Alejandro Fernández	
August 9	"Amores"	Charlie Zaa	
August 23	"Te quiero tanto, tanto"	Onda Vaselina	
September 13	"Rezo"	Carlos Ponce	
September 20	"La fuerza del amor"	Myriam Hernández	
October 4	"Perdóname, he sido una tonta"	Tormenta	
October 18	"El privilegio de amar"	Mijares	
October 25	"El privilegio de amar"	Mijares	
November 1	"Esperanza"	Enrique Iglesias	
November 15	"Ciega, Sordomuda"	Shakira	
November 29	"El privilegio de amar"	Mijares	
December 20	"Deseo"	Myriam Hernández	

== 1999 ==
Date	Single	Artist	Ref.
February 14	"Tú"	Shakira	
March 14	"Tú"	Shakira	
April 25	"No Puedo Olvidar"	MDO	
May 9	"No Puedo Olvidar"	MDO	
May 16	"No a pedir perdón"	Ana Gabriel	
May 23	"Livin' la Vida Loca"	Ricky Martin	
June 13	"Livin' la Vida Loca"	Ricky Martin	
June 20	"Inevitable"	Shakira	
July 4	"No Me Ames"	Jennifer Lopez and Marc Anthony	
July 11	"Inevitable"	Shakira	
August 1	"Píntame"	Elvis Crespo	
August 15	"Deshojo la Margarita"	René & Renny	
September 5	"Bailamos"	Enrique Iglesias	
September 26	"Bella"	Ricky Martin	
October 3	"Bella"	Ricky Martin	
October 10	"Te amaré, me amarás"	Michelangelo	
October 17	"De Hoy en Adelante"	Millie	
October 24	"Más grande que grande"	Ednita Nazario	
December 19	"Alguna vez"	Cristian Castro	

== 2000 ==
Date	Single	Artist	Ref.
May 28	"A Puro Dolor"	Son By Four	
August 13	"Celos"	Tamara	
August 27	"Muy Dentro de Mí"	Marc Anthony	
September 3	"Soy Yo"	Luis Miguel	
September 10	"Tu Forma de Querer"	Tony Cheng	
September 17	"Gozar la Vida"	Julio Iglesias	
October 1	"Un sí del alma"	Pedro Azael	
October 29	"El Último Adiós"	Paulina Rubio	
December 10	"Mi destino eres tú"	Lucero	
December 24	"Cuando una Mujer"	Melina León	

== 2002 ==
Date	Single	Artist	Ref.
February 4	"Entra en mi vida"	Sin Bandera	
December 9	"Die Another Day"	Madonna	
December 16	"Caraluna"	Bacilos	

== 2003 ==
Date	Single	Artist	Ref.
February 17	"Tu Sombra en Mí"	Cristian Castro	
April 14	"All I Have"	Jennifer Lopez featuring LL Cool J	
September 15	"¿A quién le importa?"	Thalía	

== 2004 ==
Date	Single	Artist	Ref.
June 21	"Ángel"	Belinda	

== 2005 ==
Date	Single	Artist	Ref.
March 21	"De Rodillas"	Tommy Torres	
July 25	"Desde mañana no lo sé"	Tiziano Ferro	
September 24	"No sé lo que me das"	Franco de Vita	

== 2008 ==
Date	Single	Artist	Ref.
April 4	"¿Dónde Están Corazón?"	Enrique Iglesias	
May 23	"Si No Te Hubieras Ido"	Maná	
June 20	"Pegadito"	Tommy Torres	
August 22	"No puedo olvidarte"	RBD	
August 29	"No me doy por vencido"	Luis Fonsi	
November 7	"Mi sueño"	Franco de Vita	
November 21	"No"	Ednita Nazario and Natalia Jiménez	

== 2009 ==
Date	Single	Artist	Ref.
January 16	"No Molestar"	Marco Antonio Solís	
February 6	"Tú eres para mí"	Fanny Lu	
March 27	"Jueves"	La Oreja de Van Gogh	
April 3	"El regalo más grande"	Tiziano Ferro featuring Anahí and Dulce María	
April 17	"Que te Quería"	La 5ª Estación	
May 8	"Para olvidarte de mí"	RBD	
July 17	"Recuérdame"	La 5ª Estación featuring Marc Anthony	
July 24	"Recuérdame"	La 5ª Estación featuring Marc Anthony	
October 2	"Tocando Fondo"	Ricardo Arjona	
October 16	"Manos al Aire"	Nelly Furtado	

== 2010 ==
Date	Single	Artist	Ref.
January 1	"Equivocada"	Thalía	
