= Escúchame =

Single by Carlos Ponce

from the album Todo lo Que Soy
- Released: August 16, 1999
- Studio: Crescent Moon; Miami, Florida
- Genre: Flamenco pop
- Length: 3:15
- Label: EMI Latin
- Songwriter: Marco Flores
- Producer: Marco Flores

Carlos Ponce singles chronology
"Recuerdo" (1999)	"Escúchame" (1999)	"La Razón de Mi Ser" (2000)

"Escúchame" (transl. "Listen to Me") is a song by Puerto Rican entertainer Carlos Ponce from his second studio album, Todo lo Que Soy (1999). The song was written and produced by Marco Flores. It was released as the album's lead single on August 16, 1999, by EMI Latin. A flamenco pop ballad, it features Ponce making a plea to a woman he loves. The song received positive reactions from music critics, who praised its melody and genre. Commercially, the song reached number one on the Billboard Hot Latin Songs and Latin Pop Airplay charts in the United States. The song's music video was filmed in Old San Juan in Puerto Rico and features the artist impressing a woman in a club. A Portuguese-language version of the song was released in Brazil, where it reached number one in several of its cities.

== Background and composition ==
In 1998, Ponce released his self-titled debut album, which spawned two hit singles ("Rezo" and "Decir Adiós") and had sold over 450,000 copies worldwide. The record led to Ponce winning the Billboard Latin Music Award for Pop Album of the Year by a New Artist in 1999. On July 22, 1999, Ponce announced that he was releasing his second studio album, Todo lo Que Soy, which was released on September 21, 1999, and recorded at the Crescent Moon Studios in Miami, Florida. Ponce recruited several songwriters for the project such as Marco Flores, Tim Mitchell, and Roberto Blades. Flores penned two of the album's track including "Escúchame", which he also produced. A flamenco pop ballad, the singer is "pleading calls for love". The lyrics narrate the "plea of a lover to a beautiful woman". The track utilizes flamenco guitars and hand clapping.

== Promotion and reception ==
"Escúchame" as released as the album's lead single on August 16, 1999. Ponce performed the song live at a free concert at the Coconut Grove in Miami, Florida, on September 28. He also sung the track live during a halftime show at the Miami Dolphins versus Philadelphia Eagles game on October 24, 1999. The music video for the song was filmed at Old San Juan in Puerto Rico and features the artist dancing in n club while being enamored by a woman. The visual was nominated in the category of Best Clip of the Year in the Latin field at the 2000 Billboard Video Music Awards, but lost to "Ritmo Total" (1999) by Enrique Iglesias. A Portuguese-language version of the song featuring Brazilian singer Belo was released exclusively to Brazil in 2000 and reached number one in several of its cities, according to Crowley Broadcast Analysis. A music video for the Portuguese version was released in Brazil as well.

Billboard editor John Lannert regarded the track to be "flamenco-laced" and stated its "sonic vibe recalls the chugging grooves of Enrique Iglesias' 'Bailamos'". The Dallas Morning News' Mario Tarradell found "Escúchame" to be "invigorating". Laura Emerick of the Chicago Sun-Times highlighted the song where Ponce "lets more of his personality shine through this time" on the disc. The Houston Chronicle critic Joey Guerra felt that the song "should have no problem finding an audience" and complimented Ponce's vocals, as it works "nicely with the song's airy rhythms and hand claps." At the 2001 ASCAP Latin Music Awards, it was recognized as the best-performing Latin songs of the year under "Pop/Balada" category. Commercially, the song topped the Billboard Hot Latin Songs and Latin Pop Airplay charts in the US, making it Ponce's third number one on both charts.

== Formats and track listings ==
Promotional single

1. Escúchame – 3:14
2. La Entrevista – 6:29

European single

1. Escúchame – 3:14
2. Ameilia (club mix) – 3:41

Remixes

1. Escúchame (The Eurolatin Mix) – 3:16
2. Escúchame (Mannos De Papa Mix) – 3:15
3. Escúchame (Radio Dance Mix) – 3:07

Pablo Flores remix

1. Escúchame (Pablo Flores Club Mix Radio Edit) – 4:47

Brazilian single

1. Original Version – 3:16
2. Original Version (featuring Belo) – 3:17
3. Hitmakers Samba Mix (featuring Belo) – 3:27
4. Hitmakers Radio Edit – 3:45
5. Hitmakers Extended Mix – 5:21
6. Version Balada – 3:14

== Charts ==
=== Weekly charts ===
Weekly chart positions for "Escúchame"
Chart (1999)	Peak position
US Hot Latin Songs (Billboard)	1
US Latin Pop Airplay (Billboard)	1

=== Year-end charts ===
2000 year-end chart performance for "Escúchame"
Chart (2000)	Position
US Hot Latin Songs (Billboard)	36

== See also ==
- List of number-one Billboard Hot Latin Tracks of 1999
- List of Billboard Latin Pop Airplay number ones of 1999
