= List of Billboard Latin Pop Airplay number ones of 1999 =

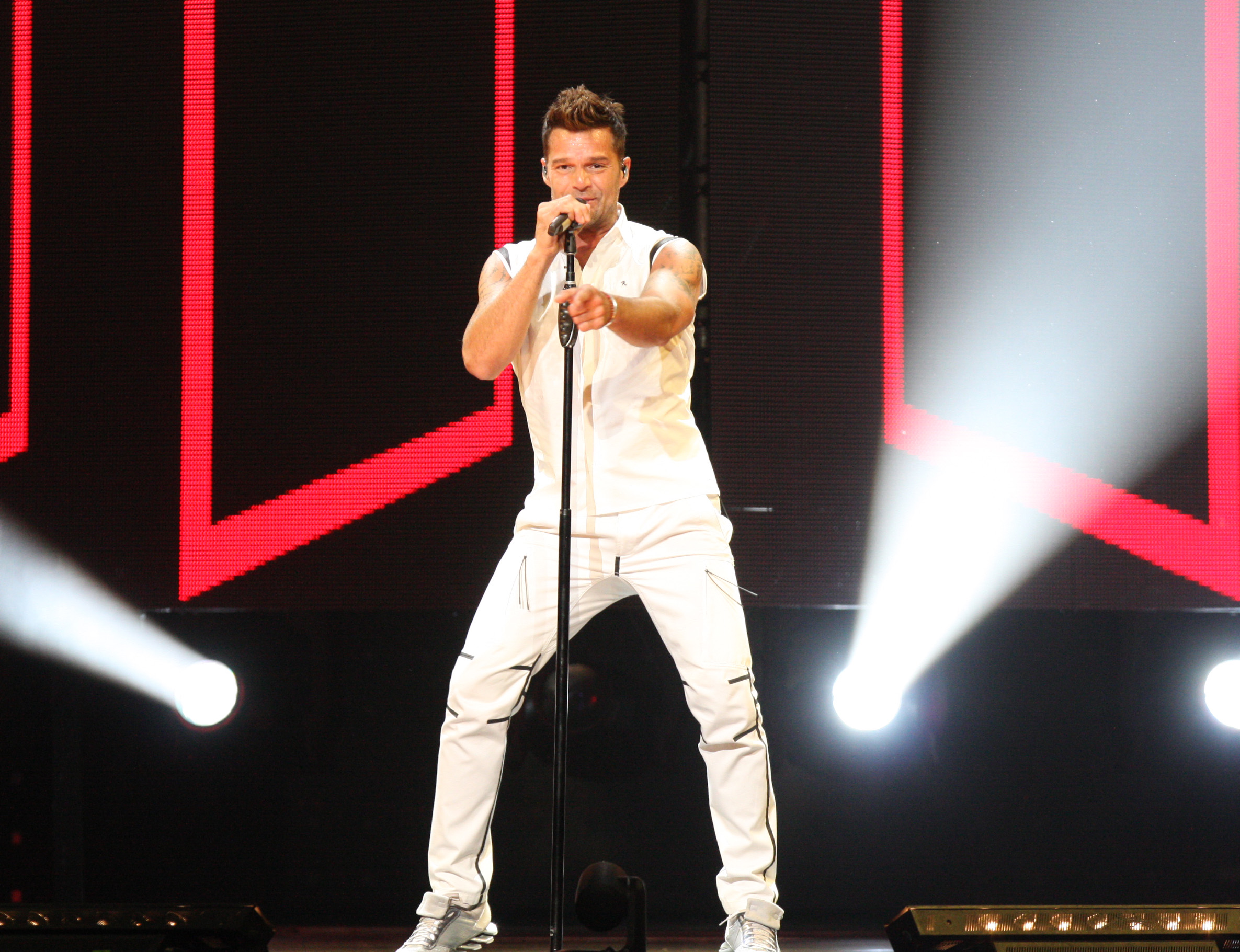
Ricky Martin was credited for starting the "Latin Pop Explosion" and had the longest-running number one of the year with the Spanish version of "Livin' la Vida Loca".

Latin Pop Airplay is a chart published by Billboard magazine that ranks the top-performing songs (regardless of genre or language) on Latin pop radio stations in the United States, based on weekly airplay data compiled by Nielsen's Broadcast Data Systems. It is a subchart of Hot Latin Songs, which lists the best-performing Spanish-language songs in the country. In 1999, 15 songs topped the chart, in 52 issues of the magazine.

The first number one of the year was "Dejaría Todo" by Chayanne, which had been in the top spot since the issue dated December 12, 1998; it spent a final total of seven weeks at this position and was named the best-performing Latin pop song of the year". 1999 was named the year of the "Latin Pop Explosion" due to the crossover appeal of Latin artists to the American public. Ricky Martin's performance of "The Cup of Life" at the 41st Annual Grammy Awards on February 24, 1999, was said to be a "game-changer for Latin music worldwide" according to Billboard's Leila Cobo. The popularity of Martin's performance was followed by the release of his song, "Livin' la Vida Loca", which became an international success by reaching number one in more than 20 countries. The Spanish-language rendition of the song was released to Latin radio stations in the US, and was the longest-running number one of the year with ten weeks. Martin also achieved his fourth chart-topper with "Bella", the Spanish-language version of "She's All I Ever Had".

Aside from Martin, Enrique Iglesias and Marc Anthony also contributed to Latin pop's popularity with "Bailamos" and "I Need to Know", respectively. "Bailamos", a Spanglish song, simultaneously topped both the Billboard Hot 100 and the Latin Pop Airplay charts, spending six weeks at number one on the latter chart. Iglesias also had the most chart-toppers in 1999, also reaching number one with two other songs, "Nunca Te Olvidaré" and "Ritmo Total". The latter song, a Spanish-language version of "Rhythm Divine", was the final number one of the year. "I Need to Know" was recorded in Spanish as "Dímelo", and became Marc Anthony's first chart-topper.

Other acts to reach number one for the first time include MDO, Millie Corretjer (credited as Millie), and Jaci Velasquez. Corretjer was the only female artist to have more than one chart-topper with "Una Voz en el Alma" and "De Hoy en Adelante". Velasquez had previously established herself as a popular Contemporary Christian music singer before crossing over to the Spanish-language market with her studio album, Llegar a Ti (1999).

== Chart history ==
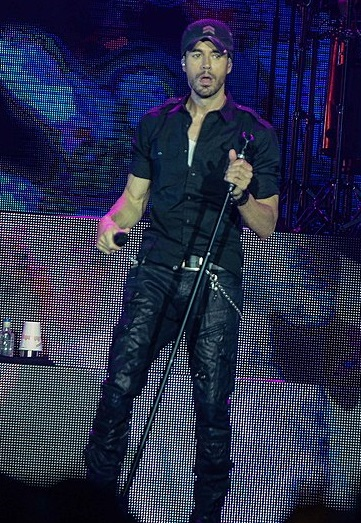
Enrique Iglesias's Spanglish hit "Bailamos" simultaneously topped the Billboard Hot 100 and the Latin Pop Airplay charts. He also had the most number ones of the year with three.

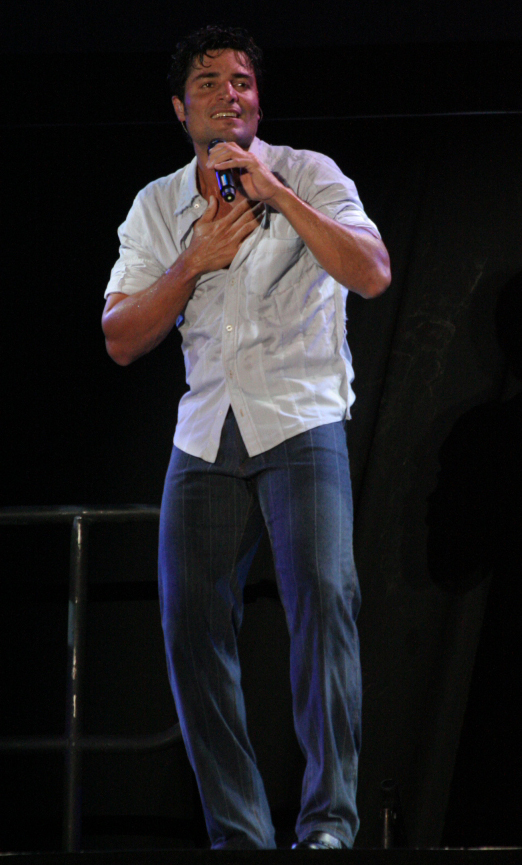
Chayanne had the first number one of the year with "Dejaría Todo", which was named the best-performing Latin pop song of the year.

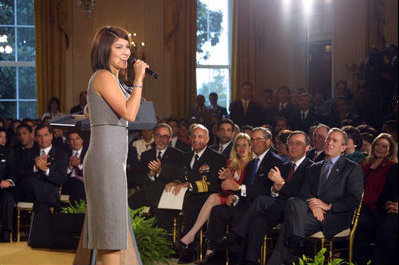
Jaci Velasquez achieved her first chart-topper with "Llegar a Ti".

Key
†	Indicates number 1 on Billboard's year-end Latin pop chart

Chart history
Issue date	Title	Artist(s)	Ref.
January 2	"Dejaría Todo" †	Chayanne	
January 9	"Dejaría Todo" †	Chayanne	
January 16	"Dejaría Todo" †	Chayanne	
January 23	"Dejaría Todo" †	Chayanne	
January 30	"Tú"	Shakira	
February 6	"Nunca Te Olvidaré"	Enrique Iglesias	
February 13	"Tú"	Shakira	
February 20	"Tú"	Shakira	
February 27	"Tú"	Shakira	
March 6	"Tú"	Shakira	
March 13	"No Puedo Olvidar"	MDO	
March 20	"No Puedo Olvidar"	MDO	
March 27	"No Puedo Olvidar"	MDO	
April 3	"No Puedo Olvidar"	MDO	
April 10	"Una Voz en el Alma"	Millie	
April 17	"Livin' la Vida Loca" (Spanish version)	Ricky Martin	
April 24	"Livin' la Vida Loca" (Spanish version)	Ricky Martin	
May 1	"Livin' la Vida Loca" (Spanish version)	Ricky Martin	
May 8	"Livin' la Vida Loca" (Spanish version)	Ricky Martin	
May 15	"Livin' la Vida Loca" (Spanish version)	Ricky Martin	
May 22	"Livin' la Vida Loca" (Spanish version)	Ricky Martin	
May 29	"Livin' la Vida Loca" (Spanish version)	Ricky Martin	
June 5	"Livin' la Vida Loca" (Spanish version)	Ricky Martin	
June 12	"Livin' la Vida Loca" (Spanish version)	Ricky Martin	
June 19	"Livin' la Vida Loca" (Spanish version)	Ricky Martin	
June 26	"Bailamos"	Enrique Iglesias	
July 3	"Bailamos"	Enrique Iglesias	
July 10	"Bailamos"	Enrique Iglesias	
July 17	"Bailamos"	Enrique Iglesias	
July 24	"Bailamos"	Enrique Iglesias	
July 31	"Bailamos"	Enrique Iglesias	
August 7	"Bella"	Ricky Martin	
August 14	"De Hoy en Adelante"	Millie	
August 21	"Bella"	Ricky Martin	
August 28	"Bella"	Ricky Martin	
September 4	"Bella"	Ricky Martin	
September 11	"Bella"	Ricky Martin	
September 18	"Bella"	Ricky Martin	
September 25	"Bella"	Ricky Martin	
October 2	"El Poder de Tu Amor"	Ricardo Montaner	
October 9	"El Poder de Tu Amor"	Ricardo Montaner	
October 16	"El Poder de Tu Amor"	Ricardo Montaner	
October 23	"Dímelo"	Marc Anthony	
October 30	"O Tú o Ninguna"	Luis Miguel	
November 6	"O Tú o Ninguna"	Luis Miguel	
November 13	"Llegar a Ti"	Jaci Velasquez	
November 20	"Llegar a Ti"	Jaci Velasquez	
November 27	"O Tú o Ninguna"	Luis Miguel	
December 4	"Escúchame"	Carlos Ponce	
December 11	"Llegar a Ti"	Jaci Velasquez	
December 18	"Ritmo Total"	Enrique Iglesias	
December 25	"Ritmo Total"	Enrique Iglesias	
