= List of Billboard Latin Pop Airplay number ones of 1998 =

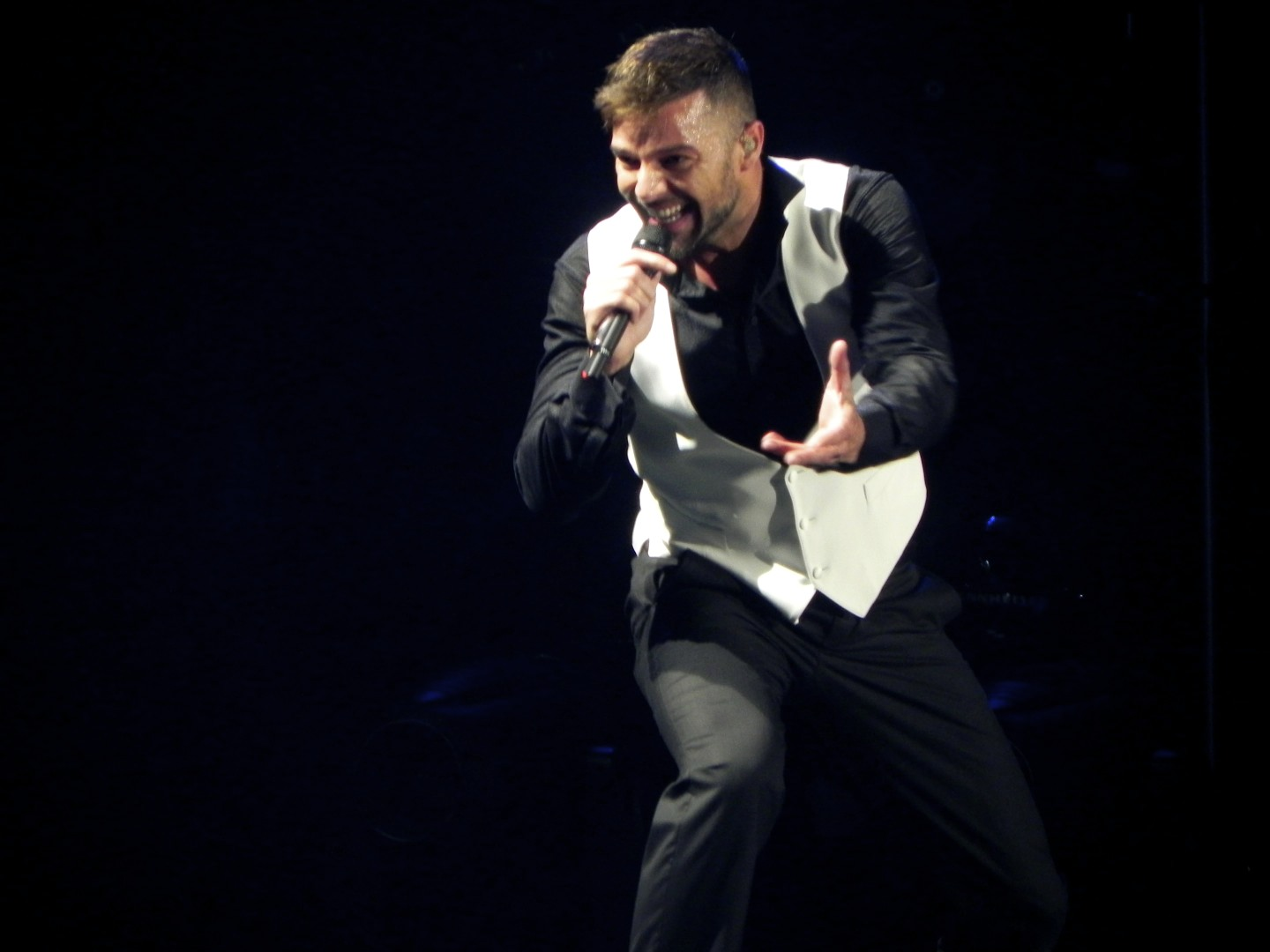
Ricky Martin achieved his first chart-topper with "Vuelve" which was named the best-performing song of the year.

Latin Pop Airplay is a chart published by Billboard magazine that ranks the top-performing songs (regardless of genre or language) on Latin pop radio stations in the United States, based on weekly airplay data compiled by Nielsen's Broadcast Data Systems (BDS). It is a subchart of Hot Latin Songs, which lists the best-performing Spanish-language songs in the country. In 1998, 15 songs topped the chart, in 50 issues of the magazine. Due to damage to the BDS monitors in Puerto Rico caused by Hurricane Georges, the Latin Pop Airplay chart, along with the other Latin song charts, was not published in the issues dated October 10 and October 17. 1998 was named "The Year of the Romantic Songs" by El Nuevo Herald due to the popularity of ballads.

The first number one of the year was "En El Jardín" by Alejandro Fernández and Gloria Estefan, which had been in the top spot since the chart dated December 13, 1997. It remained in the top position for five more weeks until it was displaced by Celine Dion's "My Heart Will Go On", the theme song from the 1997 film Titanic. "My Heart Will Go On" is the second English-language song to top the chart after "I Could Fall in Love" by Selena in 1995. "No Sé Olvidar" by Fernández held this position for eight weeks and tied with Carlos Ponce's debut single "Rezo" for the longest run at number one. Ponce had established himself as a soap opera actor before becoming a musical artist.

Ricky Martin obtained his first chart-topper with his ballad "Vuelve" which was named the best-performing song of the year despite the track only having spent three weeks at number one. Martin was the first artist in the chart's history to replace himself at number one when "Perdido Sin Ti" succeeded "Vuelve". Fernández, Ponce, Martin, and Estefan were the only acts to have more than one chart-topper in 1998, with the latter being the only female artist to achieve this. Alejandro Sanz also gained his first number one with "Amiga Mía" while "Te Quiero Tanto, Tanto" by OV7, which was recorded as the theme song for the Mexican telenovela Mi pequeña traviesa (1997), remains the group's only chart-topper. Chayanne had the final number one of the year with "Dejaría Todo".

== Chart history ==
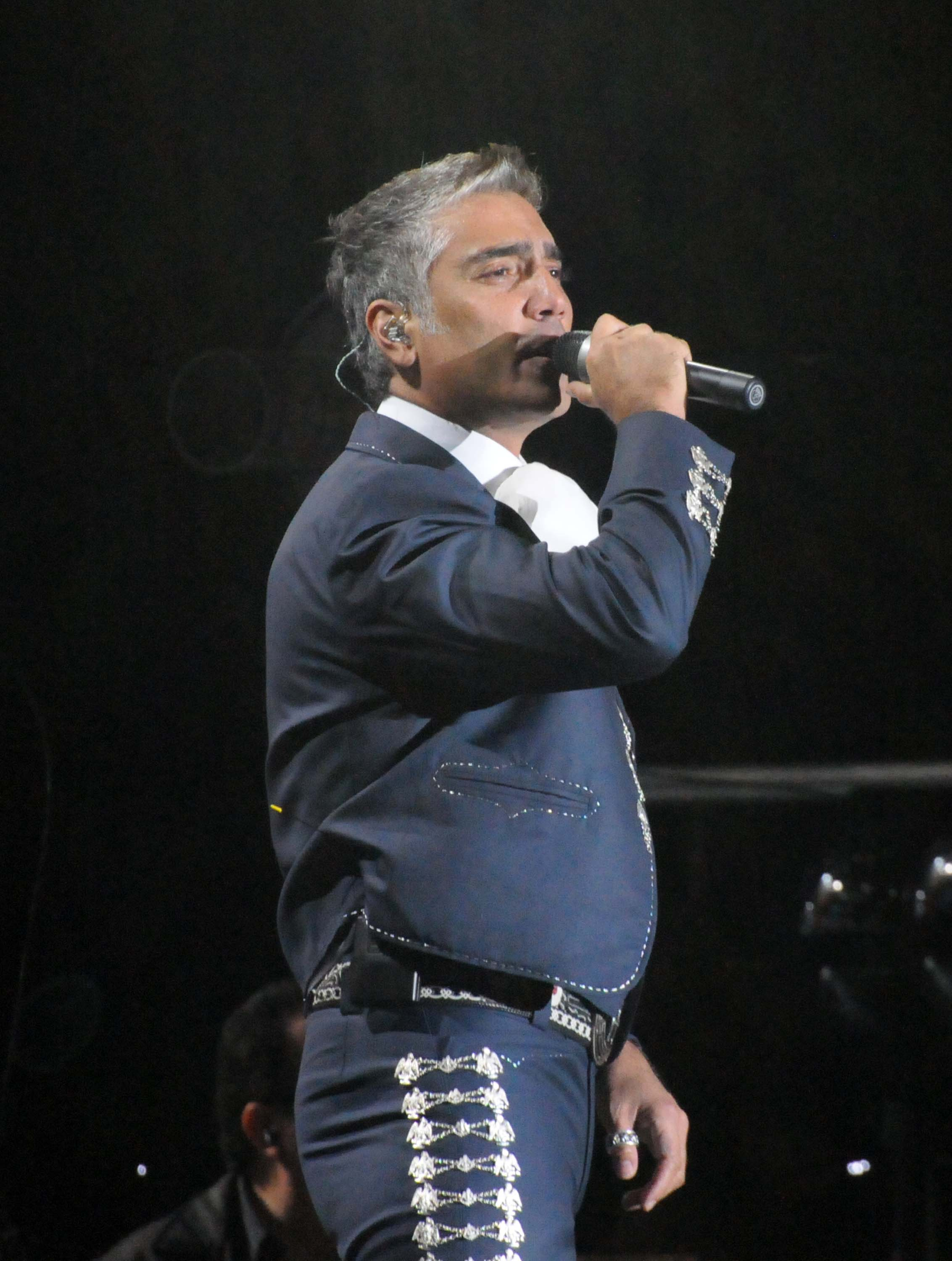
Alejandro Fernández spent a total of 13 weeks at number one in 1998 with two songs.

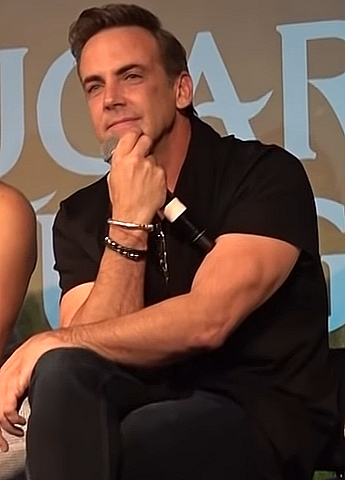
Carlos Ponce's debut single "Rezo" tied with "No Sé Olvidar" by Fernández as the longest-running number one song of 1998.

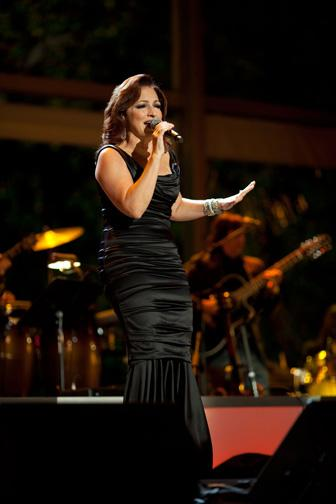
Gloria Estefan was the only female artist to have more than one song reach number one in 1998.

Key
†	Indicates number 1 on Billboard's year-end Latin pop chart

Chart history
Issue date	Title	Artist(s)	Ref.
January 3	"En El Jardín"	Alejandro Fernández featuring Gloria Estefan	
January 10	"En El Jardín"	Alejandro Fernández featuring Gloria Estefan	
January 17	"En El Jardín"	Alejandro Fernández featuring Gloria Estefan	
January 24	"En El Jardín"	Alejandro Fernández featuring Gloria Estefan	
January 31	"En El Jardín"	Alejandro Fernández featuring Gloria Estefan	
February 7	"My Heart Will Go On"	Celine Dion	
February 14	"My Heart Will Go On"	Celine Dion	
February 21	"My Heart Will Go On"	Celine Dion	
February 28	"Vuelve" †	Ricky Martin	
March 7	"Vuelve" †	Ricky Martin	
March 14	"My Heart Will Go On"	Celine Dion	
March 21	"No Sé Olvidar"	Alejandro Fernández	
March 28	"Cómo Dueles en los Labios"	Maná	
April 4	"No Sé Olvidar"	Alejandro Fernández	
April 11	"No Sé Olvidar"	Alejandro Fernández	
April 18	"No Sé Olvidar"	Alejandro Fernández	
April 25	"No Sé Olvidar"	Alejandro Fernández	
May 2	"No Sé Olvidar"	Alejandro Fernández	
May 9	"No Sé Olvidar"	Alejandro Fernández	
May 16	"No Sé Olvidar"	Alejandro Fernández	
May 23	"Huele a Peligro"	Myriam Hernández	
May 30	"Huele a Peligro"	Myriam Hernández	
June 6	"Amiga Mía"	Alejandro Sanz	
June 13	"Amiga Mía"	Alejandro Sanz	
June 20	"Corazón Prohibido"	Gloria Estefan	
June 27	"Rezo"	Carlos Ponce	
July 4	"Rezo"	Carlos Ponce	
July 11	"Rezo"	Carlos Ponce	
July 18	"Rezo"	Carlos Ponce	
July 25	"Rezo"	Carlos Ponce	
August 1	"Rezo"	Carlos Ponce	
August 8	"Rezo"	Carlos Ponce	
August 15	"Rezo"	Carlos Ponce	
August 22	"Te Quiero Tanto, Tanto"	OV7	
August 29	"Te Quiero Tanto, Tanto"	OV7	
September 5	"Vuelve" †	Ricky Martin	
September 12	"Perdido Sin Ti"	Ricky Martin	
September 19	"Perdido Sin Ti"	Ricky Martin	
September 26	"Decir Adiós"	Carlos Ponce	
October 3	"Decir Adiós"	Carlos Ponce	
October 10	No charts published		
October 17	No charts published		
October 24	"Esperanza"	Enrique Iglesias	
October 31	"Esperanza"	Enrique Iglesias	
November 7	"Esperanza"	Enrique Iglesias	
November 14	"Esperanza"	Enrique Iglesias	
November 21	"Ciega, Sordomuda"	Shakira	
November 28	"Ciega, Sordomuda"	Shakira	
December 5	"Ciega, Sordomuda"	Shakira	
December 12	"Dejaría Todo"	Chayanne	
December 19	"Dejaría Todo"	Chayanne	
December 26	"Dejaría Todo"	Chayanne	

== See also ==
- 1998 in Latin music
