= List of number-one Billboard Hot Latin Tracks of 1998 =

This is a list containing the Billboard Hot Latin Tracks number-ones of 1998. Due to damage to the Broadcast Data Systems monitors in Puerto Rico caused by Hurricane Georges, no charts were published from October 10 to October 17.

| Issue date | Song | Artist(s) | Ref. |
|---|---|---|---|
| January 3 | "Si Tú Supieras" | Alejandro Fernández | |
| January 10 | "En El Jardín" | Alejandro Fernández and Gloria Estefan | |
| January 17 | "En El Jardín" | Alejandro Fernández and Gloria Estefan | |
| January 24 | "En El Jardín" | Alejandro Fernández and Gloria Estefan | |
| January 31 | "En El Jardín" | Alejandro Fernández and Gloria Estefan | |
| February 7 | "Por Qué Te Conocí" | Los Temerarios | |
| February 14 | "En El Jardín" | Alejandro Fernández and Gloria Estefan | |
| February 21 | "My Heart Will Go On" | Céline Dion | |
| February 28 | "Vuelve" | Ricky Martin | |
| March 7 | "Vuelve" | Ricky Martin | |
| March 14 | "No Sé Olvidar" | Alejandro Fernández | |
| March 21 | "No Sé Olvidar" | Alejandro Fernández | |
| March 28 | "No Sé Olvidar" | Alejandro Fernández | |
| April 4 | "No Sé Olvidar" | Alejandro Fernández | |
| April 11 | "No Sé Olvidar" | Alejandro Fernández | |
| April 18 | "No Sé Olvidar" | Alejandro Fernández | |
| April 25 | "No Sé Olvidar" | Alejandro Fernández | |
| May 2 | "No Sé Olvidar" | Alejandro Fernández | |
| May 9 | "Una Fan Enamorada" | Servando & Florentino | |
| May 16 | "Suavemente" | Elvis Crespo | |
| May 23 | "Suavemente" | Elvis Crespo | |
| May 30 | "Suavemente" | Elvis Crespo | |
| June 6 | "Suavemente" | Elvis Crespo | |
| June 13 | "Suavemente" | Elvis Crespo | |
| June 20 | "Suavemente" | Elvis Crespo | |
| June 27 | "Rezo" | Carlos Ponce | |
| July 4 | "Rezo" | Carlos Ponce | |
| July 11 | "Rezo" | Carlos Ponce | |
| July 18 | "Yo Nací Para Amarte" | Alejandro Fernandez | |
| July 25 | "Yo Nací Para Amarte" | Alejandro Fernandez | |
| August 1 | "Yo Nací Para Amarte" | Alejandro Fernandez | |
| August 8 | "Yo Nací Para Amarte" | Alejandro Fernandez | |
| August 15 | "Yo Nací Para Amarte" | Alejandro Fernandez | |
| August 22 | "Te Quiero Tanto, Tanto" | Onda Vaselina | |
| August 29 | "Tu Sonrisa" | Elvis Crespo | |
| September 5 | "Oye!" | Gloria Estefan | |
| September 12 | "Tu Sonrisa" | Elvis Crespo | |
| September 19 | "Perdido Sin Ti" | Ricky Martin | |
| September 26 | "Decir Adiós" | Carlos Ponce | |
| October 3 | "Decir Adiós" | Carlos Ponce | |
| October 10 | N/A | No Charts Published | |
| October 17 | N/A | No Charts Published | |
| October 24 | "Esperanza" | Enrique Iglesias | |
| October 31 | "Esperanza" | Enrique Iglesias | |
| November 7 | "Esperanza" | Enrique Iglesias | |
| November 14 | "Esperanza" | Enrique Iglesias | |
| November 21 | "Ciega, Sordomuda" | Shakira | |
| November 28 | "Ciega, Sordomuda" | Shakira | |
| December 5 | "Ciega, Sordomuda" | Shakira | |
| December 12 | "Dejaría Todo" | Chayanne | |
| December 19 | "Dejaría Todo" | Chayanne | |
| December 26 | "Mi PC" | Juan Luis Guerra | |

== See also ==
- Billboard Hot Latin Tracks
