= Pasajero =

Pasajero may refer to:

- Pasajero (Gipsy Kings album), 2006
- Pasajero (Ari Borovoy album), 2008
