= Ari Borovoy (album) =

Studio album by Ari Borovoy
- Released: 25 February 2005
- Genre: Latin pop Pop
- Label: Sony Music
- Producer: Mauri Stern, Graeme Pleeth, Chris Rodriguez

Ari Borovoy chronology
Ari Borovoy (2005)	Pasajero (2008)

Ari Borovoy was Ari Borovoy's first solo album, released in 2005. Videos were made for two singles: "Booming" and "Si No Está." The album was digitally released in the United States in 2009.

Borovoy, a founding member of the Latin pop group OV7, made the disc during a seven-year period (2003–2010) in which the group had disbanded.

== Track listing ==
1. "Éxtasis"
2. "Tú"
3. "Booming"
4. "Te Encontré"
5. "Me Vales"
6. "Si No Está"
7. "Se Fué"
8. "Frágiles"
9. "Llueve"
10. "Volvamos A Amar"
11. "Tiempo Atrás"
