= Te Quiero Tanto, Tanto =

Single by OV7

from the album Entrega Total
- B-side: "Mírame a Los Ojos"
- Released: 1997
- Genre: Latin pop
- Length: 3:11
- Label: Sony Music Mexico
- Songwriter: Memo Mendez-Guiu
- Producers: J.R. Florez; Memo Mendez-Guiu

OV7 singles chronology
"Aunque Muera Por Ti" (1997)	"Te Quiero Tanto, Tanto" (1997)	"Tus Besos" (1998)

"Te Quiero Tanto, Tanto" (transl. "I Love You Very, Very Much") is a song written and produced by Memo Mendez-Guiu and performed by Mexican pop group OV7 from their album Entrega Total (1998). It premiered as the main theme for the Mexican telenovela Mi pequeña traviesa. The album contains two versions of the song, one which references the telenovela and the other that does not. "Te Quiero Tanto, Tanto" is their only song to reach number one on the Hot Latin Songs chart in the US. In a retrospective review of the songs that reached number one on the Hot Latin Songs in 1998, Jessica Roiz of Billboard magazine called it "Such a timeless piece in every '90s child’s heart".

== Charts ==
=== Weekly charts ===
Weekly chart positions for "Te Quiero Tanto, Tanto"
Chart (1998)	Peak position
US Hot Latin Songs (Billboard)	1
US Latin Pop Airplay (Billboard)	1

=== Year-end charts ===
1998 year-end chart performance for "Te Quiero Tanto, Tanto"
Chart (1998)	Position
US Hot Latin Songs (Billboard)	22
US Latin Pop Airplay (Billboard)	13

== See also ==
- List of number-one Billboard Hot Latin Tracks of 1998
- List of Billboard Latin Pop Airplay number ones of 1998
