= Una Voz en el Alma =

"Una Voz en Alma"

Single by Millie Corretjer

from the album Amar Es un Juego
- Released: 1999
- Studio: Circle House Recording Studios; Criteria Moon Studios (Miami, Florida, U.S.A.)
- Genre: Latin pop; latin ballad
- Length: 3:59
- Label: EMI Latin
- Songwriter: Rudy Pérez · Gustavo Márquez
- Producer: Rudy Pérez

Millie Corretjer singles chronology
"Ámame" (1998)	"Una Voz en Alma" (1999)	"De Hoy en Adelante" (1999)

"Una Voz en el Alma" (English: A Voice in the Soul) is a song performed by Puerto Rican-American singer Millie Corretjer (credited simply as Millie) from her third studio album Amar Es un Juego (1999). It was released as the lead single by EMI Latin on 1999 and became her first #1 on the Billboard Latin Pop Airplay chart in the US. El Norte Deborah Davis gave the song a positive review, citing it along with "Llora Por Él" where the singer "uses all her interpretive resources to shine brightly." It was recognized as one of the best-performing songs of the year at the ASCAP Latin Awards under the pop/ballad category in 2000.

== Charts ==
=== Weekly charts ===
Weekly chart positions for "Una Vez en el Alma"
Chart (1999)	Peak position
US Hot Latin Songs (Billboard)	3
US Latin Pop Airplay (Billboard)	1

=== Year-end charts ===
1999 year-end chart performance for "Una Voz en el Alma"
Chart (1999)	Position
US Hot Latin Songs (Billboard)	38
US Latin Pop Airplay (Billboard)	15

== See also ==
- List of Billboard Latin Pop Airplay number ones of 1999
