= De Hoy en Adelante =

Single by Millie Corretjer

from the album Amar Es un Juego
- Released: 1999
- Studio: Bullseye Recording Studios, Los Angeles, CA; Circle House Recording Studios, Miami, FL; Coco Butt Studios, Los Angeles, CA; Criteria Recording New River Recording Studios, Ft. Lauderdale, FL; On The Mark Studios, Los Angeles, CA
- Genre: Latin pop
- Length: 4:28
- Label: EMI Latin
- Songwriter: Rudy Pérez
- Producer: Nelson Gonzalez

Millie Corretjer singles chronology
"Una Voz en el Alma" (1999)	"De Hoy en Adelante" (1999)

"De Hoy en Adelante" ("From Now On") is a song by Puerto Rican singer Millie Corretjer (credited simply as Millie) from her third studio album, Amar Es un Juego (1999). It was released as the second single in 1999 and became her second #1 on the Latin Pop Airplay chart and her first on the Hot Latin Songs chart in the US. El Norte Deborah Davis favorably compared it to Cher stating that the artist "taps into the rich vein that has served Cher so well in recent months: emotionally surviving marital disasters. So if you're a woman looking for another battle hymn, turn to Millie ASAP." El Nuevo Herald's Eliseo Cardona cited it as one of the tracks where Corretjer as the "plate having salvageable parts" on the album. It was recognized as one of the best-performing songs of the year at the ASCAP Latin Awards under the pop/ballad category in 2000.

== Charts ==
=== Weekly charts ===
Weekly chart positions for "De Hoy en Adelante"
Chart (1999)	Peak position
US Hot Latin Songs (Billboard)	1
US Latin Pop Airplay (Billboard)	1

=== Year-end charts ===
1999 year-end chart performance for "De Hoy en Adelante"
Chart (1999)	Position
US Hot Latin Songs (Billboard)	13
US Latin Pop Airplay (Billboard)	9

== See also ==
- List of number-one Billboard Hot Latin Tracks of 1999
- List of Billboard Latin Pop Airplay number ones of 1999
