= Pasajero (Ari Borovoy album) =

Studio album by Ari Borovoy
- Released: 11 February 2008
- Recorded: 2007
- Genre: Latin pop Pop
- Label: BoBo Producciones
- Producer: Ari Borovoy

Ari Borovoy chronology
Ari Borovoy (2005)	Pasajero (2008)

Pasajero is the second solo album from OV7 member Ari Borovoy. Like his first solo disc, 2005's Ari Borovoy, the album was created during a seven-year period (2003–2010) in which OV7 had split up. "Vivo" was the album's first single; a video was also released for the song.

== Track listing ==
1. "Vivo"
2. "Ella"
3. "Pasajero"
4. "Para Mi"
5. "Llegas A Mi"
6. "Tengo Mucho Calor"
7. "No Aguanto Mas"
8. "Vete Muy Lejos"
9. "Delovers [Vivo Remix Version]"
10. "Para Mi [Remix Version]"
