= Por amor o por dinero =

American dating reality series

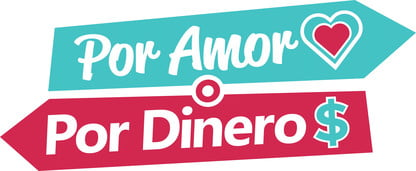
- Genre: Reality
- Presented by: Carlos Ponce
- Country of origin: United States
- Original language: Spanish
- No. of seasons: 1
- No. of episodes: 35

Production
- Executive producers: Francisco Suárez; Juliannette Reyes; Luciano Cardinali
- Production location: Dominican Republic
- Production company: Acun Medya

Original release
- Network: Telemundo
- Release: November 17, 2021 – January 10, 2022

Por amor o por dinero (English: For Love or For Money) is an American Spanish-language dating reality show produced by Acun Medya for Telemundo. The series was announced on October 19, 2021. It premiered on November 17, 2021, on Telemundo.

== Format ==
The reality shows follows 16 single contestants, eight women and eight men, living in an isolated tropical paradise. The contestants must pair up, whether it be for love or money, and compete in mental and physical challenges. Through the season the contestants must re-couple when they can choose either to remain in their current couple or swap partner. The participants who remain single are eliminated. The overall winning couple, chosen by viewers vote, will split the $200,000 cash price.

== Participants ==
Name	Age	Residence	Entered	Exited	Status	Ref
José Luis Verdugo	37	Chicago, Illinois	Day 1	Day 54	Winner	
Oana Chelaru	27	Ecuador	Day 13	Day 54	Winner	
Jennifher Danielle	29	The Bronx, New York	Day 1	Day 54	Runner-up	
Lewis Mendoza	28	Massachusetts	Day 1	Day 54	Runner-up	
Nobiraida Infante	31	Miami, Florida	Day 1	Day 54	Third place	
Sahit Sosa	31	Guadalajara, Mexico	Day 20	Day 54	Third place	
Dina Muñoz	31	New York, New York	Day 1	Day 54	Fourth Place	
Rubén Diaz	30	Miami, Florida	Day 1	Day 54	Fourth Place	
Anthony Cruz	31	Los Angeles, California	Day 1	Day 52	Eliminated	
Maricielo Gamarra	26	Los Angeles, California	Day 1	Day 52	Eliminated	
Alessandra Goñi Bucio	24	Los Angeles, California	Day 28	Day 48	Eliminated	
Clovis Nienow	28	Los Angeles, California	Day 1	Day 44	Eliminated	
Edgar Delgado	34	Mexico	Day 13	Day 41	Eliminated	
Glenda Chapa	25	McAllen, Texas	Day 1	Day 37	Eliminated	
Lisandra Delgado	32	Miami, Florida	Day 1	Day 34	Eliminated	
Asaf Torres	24	Vega Baja, Puerto Rico	Day 1	Day 31	Walked	
Karla Mariana	33	Los Angeles, California	Day 1	Day 24	Eliminated	
Silverio Rocchi	33	Los Angeles, California	Day 1	Day 17	Eliminated	
Diego Val	34	Miami, Florida	Day 1	Day 13	Walked	
Música Pereyra	35	Orlando, Florida	Day 1	Day 6	Eliminated	

== Coupling and elimination history ==
	Day 1	Day 6	Day 13	Day 20	Day 28	Day 34	Day 42	Day 48	Final
José Luis	Lisandra	Dina	Dina	Dina	Dina	Dina	Dina	Oana	Winner (Day 54)
Oana	Not in Oasis		Anthony	Edgar	Anthony	Anthony	Anthony	José Luis	Winner (Day 54)
Jennifher	Lewis	Lewis	Lewis	Clovis	Clovis	Lewis	Lewis	Lewis	Runner-up (Day 54)
Lewis	Jennifher	Jennifher	Jennifher	Karla	Maricielo	Jennifher	Jennifher	Jennifher	Runner-up (Day 54)
Nobiraida	Silverio	Rubén	Edgar	Sahit	Sahit	Sahit	Sahit	Sahit	Third Place (Day 54)
Sahit	Not in Oasis			Nobiraida	Nobiraida	Nobiraida	Nobiraida	Nobiraida	Third Place (Day 54)
Dina	Rubén	José Luis	José Luis	José Luis	José Luis	José Luis	José Luis	Rubén	Fourth Place (Day 54)
Rubén	Dina	Nobiraida	Glenda	Glenda	Glenda	Glenda	Alessandra	Dina	Fourth Place (Day 54)
Anthony	Maricielo	Glenda	Oana	Maricielo	Oana	Oana	Oana	Maricielo	Eliminated (Day 54)
Maricielo	Anthony	Clovis	Clovis	Anthony	Lewis	Clovis	Clovis	Anthony	Eliminated (Day 54)
Alessandra	Not in Oasis				Edgar	Edgar	Rubén	N/A	Eliminated (Day 48)
Clovis	Glenda	Maricielo	Maricielo	Jennifher	Jennifher	Maricielo	Maricielo	Eliminated (Day 44)	
Edgar	Not in Oasis		Nobiraida	Oana	Alessandra	Alessandra	Eliminated (Day 41)		
Glenda	Clovis	Anthony	Rubén	Rubén	Rubén	Rubén	Eliminated (Day 37)		
Lisandra	José Luis	Asaf	Asaf	Asaf	Asaf	N/A	Eliminated (Day 34)		
Asaf	Karla	Lisandra	Lisandra	Lisandra	Lisandra	Walked (Day 31)			
Karla	Asaf	Silverio	Silverio	Lewis	Eliminated (Day 24)				
Silverio	Nobiraida	Karla	Karla	Eliminated (Day 17)					
Diego	Música	Música	N/A	Walked (Day 13)					
Música	Diego	Diego	Eliminated (Day 10)						

== Episodes ==
No.	Title	Original release date	U.S. viewers (millions)
1	"Sube la temperatura del Oasis"	November 17, 2021	1.00
2	"Fiesta de solteros"	November 18, 2021	0.66
3	"Atracción inevitable"	November 19, 2021	0.79
4	"La tentación"	November 22, 2021	0.77
5	"Confusión en el Oasis"	November 23, 2021	0.71
6	"Rivalidad al máximo"	November 24, 2021	0.81
7	"La encrucijada"	November 25, 2021	0.48
8	"La primera despedida"	November 26, 2021	0.62
9	"La nueva contrincante"	November 29, 2021	0.77
10	"Cupido a la vista"	November 30, 2021	0.94
11	"Entre dos aguas"	December 1, 2021	0.75
12	"La intriga"	December 2, 2021	0.69
13	"Nuevo adiós en el Oasis"	December 3, 2021	0.74
14	"La nueva sensación"	December 6, 2021	N/A
15	"Leña al fuego"	December 7, 2021	0.76
16	"En el ojo del huracán"	December 8, 2021	0.84
17	"Enredados por Oana"	December 9, 2021	0.77
18	"Avispero alborotado"	December 10, 2021	0.75
19	"Aumenta la incertidumbre"	December 14, 2021	0.86
20	"Oasis encendido"	December 15, 2021	0.77
21	"Riñas desatadas"	December 16, 2021	0.86
22	"Nuevas reglas"	December 17, 2021	N/A
23	"Una dolorosa salida"	December 20, 2021	0.87
24	"Traición en el Oasis"	December 21, 2021	0.93
25	"El complot"	December 22, 2021	0.89
26	"La inminente despedida"	December 23, 2021	N/A
27	"Amor fraternal"	December 27, 2021	N/A
28	"Tentar a la suerte"	December 28, 2021	N/A
29	"A todo o nada"	December 29, 2021	N/A
30	"Sobrevivir a las nominaciones"	December 30, 2021	N/A
31	"Más nervios que nunca"	January 3, 2022	0.84
32	"Los consejos de Alicia"	January 4, 2022	0.86
33	"Dar la cara"	January 5, 2022	0.98
34	"Quedan ocho solteros"	January 7, 2022	N/A
35	"La emoción de la final"	January 10, 2022	0.97

== Ratings ==
Viewership and ratings per season of Por amor o por dinero
Season	Timeslot (ET)	Episodes	First aired		Last aired		Avg. viewers (millions)
Season	Timeslot (ET)	Episodes	Date	Viewers (millions)	Date	Viewers (millions)	Avg. viewers (millions)
1	Mon–Fri 7:00 p.m.	27 (Note: Should reflect the number of episodes that contribute to the average given in the last column.)	November 17, 2021	1.00	January 10, 2022	0.97	0.81
