= Ari Borovoy =

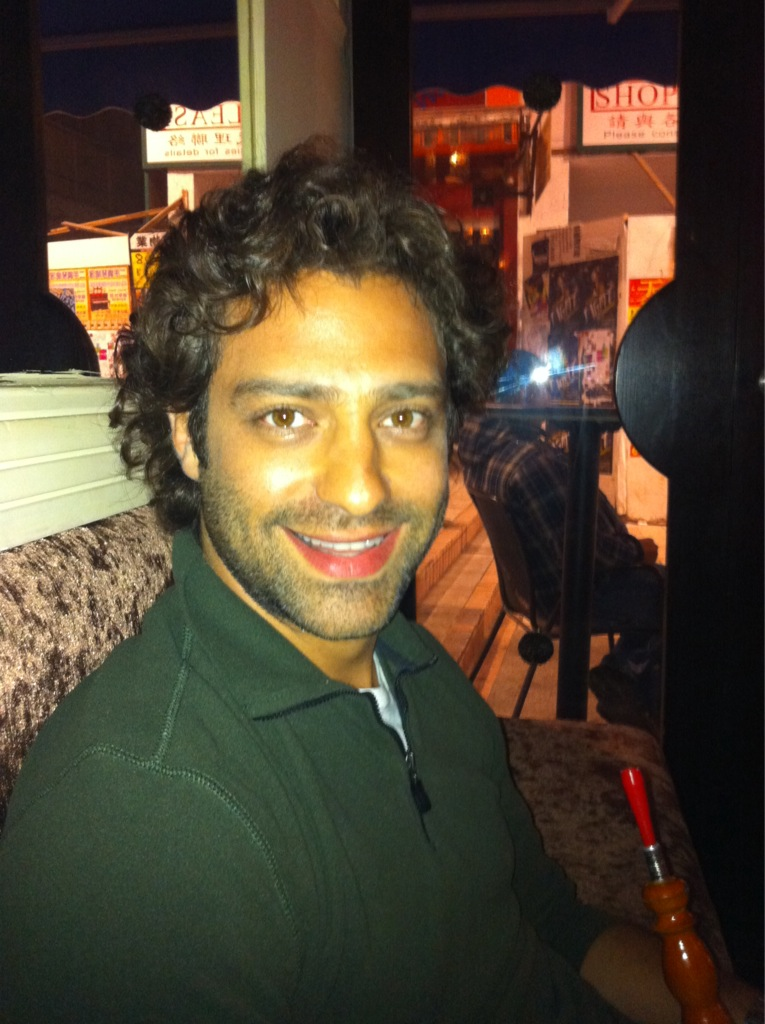
- ] Ari borovoy]

Background information
- Born: Ari Borovoy Hofmann; May 29, 1979 (age 46); Mexico City, Mexico
- Genres: Latin pop Pop
- Occupations: Musician, singer-songwriter, actor
- Instrument: Vocals
- Years active: 1989–present

Ari Borovoy (born May 29, 1979, in Mexico City) is a Mexican singer, songwriter, and actor, a founding member of the Latin music children's group La Onda Vaselina which evolved into the Latin pop group OV7.

== Career ==
As a songwriter, Borovoy had a hand in creating several of the group's hits, including "Aum Aum," "Shake Shake," "Te Necesito" and "No Me Voy." He has also recorded solo albums, starred on telenovelas and in films.

OV7 disbanded in 2003 and the OV7 brand remained inactive until Borovoy and five members reunited in 2010. During the interim, Borovoy launched a solo career, starting with an acting role on the Televisa telenovela Clap... El Lugar De Tus Sueños. His first solo album, Ari Borovoy, appeared in 2005, with the single "Booming" emerging as a hit. Borovoy had a hand in writing nine of the album's tracks.

Borovoy's second solo album, Pasajero, was released in 2008. The disc was issued under Borovoy's own label, BoBo Producciones, and he produced the album and wrote five songs. The first single was titled "Vivo".

== Personal life ==
Borovoy's father is Mexican and his mother is Costa Rican. He has two siblings, Jack and Denise. He is also Debi Nova's cousin.

On December 4, 2010, he married Arlett Kalach in a civil ceremony in Mexico City; on January 15, 2011, the two renewed their vows in a Jewish ceremony.

In October 2012, Borovoy announced that the couple was expecting their first child. The baby is due in April.

== Solo discography ==
- Ari Borovoy - 2005
- Pasajero - 2008

== TV roles ==
- Clap, el lugar de tus sueños - 2003
- RBD La Familia - 2007
- Verano de Amor - 2009

== Films ==
- Cuatro Labios - 2006
- Deseo - 2013
