= Todo lo Que Soy =

Studio album by Carlos Ponce
- Released: September 21, 1999
- Genre: Latin pop
- Length: 49:40
- Language: Spanish
- Label: EMI Latin
- Producer: Freddy Piñero, Jr.; Jon Secada; Ed Williams

Carlos Ponce chronology
| Carlos Ponce (1998) | Todo lo Que Soy (1999) | Ponce (2002) |

Todo lo Que Soy (All I Am) is the second studio album released by Puerto Rican singer Carlos Ponce. At the 2000 Billboard Latin Music Awards, it was nominated for Pop Album of the Year by a Male Artist, but lost to Amarte Es un Placer by Luis Miguel.

== Track listing ==
| No. | Title | Writer(s) | Length |
|---|---|---|---|
| 1. | "Todo Lo Que Soy" | Tim Mitchell; Carlos Ponce | 3:41 |
| 2. | "La Razón de Mi Ser" | Mitchell | 3:48 |
| 3. | "Escúchame" | Marco Flores | 3:15 |
| 4. | "Sigues Conmigo" | | 4:01 |
| 5. | "Amiga Sombra" | Ponce | 3:59 |
| 6. | "Hay Algo en Ti" | Mitchell; Ponce | 4:03 |
| 7. | "Me Muero, Me Muero" | Flores; Ponce | 4:10 |
| 8. | "Si Te Vas" | Randall Barlow; Roberto Blades | 3:22 |
| 9. | "Dejate Querer" | Piñero, Jr; Ponce | 3:53 |
| 10. | "Vuelve a Mi" | Ponce | 4:33 |
| 11. | "Canción de Cuna" |

== Charts ==
| Chart (1999) | Peak position |
|---|---|
| US Top Latin Albums (Billboard) | 19 |
| US Latin Pop Albums (Billboard) | 9 |

== Certification ==
| Region | Certification | Certified units/sales |
|---|---|---|
| United States (RIAA) | Platinum (Latin) | 100,000^{^} |
^{^} Shipments figures based on certification alone.
