= Entrega Total =

Enterga Total

Studio album by OV7
- Released: April 14, 1998
- Length: 54:10
- Label: Columbia; Sony Discos
- Producer: J.R. Florez • Memo Mendez-Guiu

OV7 chronology
Hoy (1995)	Enterga Total (1998)	Vuela Más Alto (1998)

Professional ratings
Review scores
Source	Rating
Allmusic	4/5 stars

Entrega Total ("Full Delivery") is a studio album by Mexican pop band OV7. The album was nominated "Latin Pop Album of the Year by a Duo or Group" and "Latin Pop Album of the Year by a New Artist" at the 1999 Billboard Latin Music Awards. The contains the lead single "Te Quiero Tanto, Tanto" from the Mexican telenovela Mi pequeña traviesa (1997).

== Track listing ==
The information from AllMusic.

No.	Title	Writer(s)	Length
1.	"Aunque Muera Por Ti"	Mario Ablanedo, David Boradoni	03:49
2.	"Extragrande"	Ablanedo, Boradoni	03:12
3.	"Me Gustan los Dos"	Ablanedo, Boradoni	03:29
4.	"Entrega Total"	Memo Mendez-Guiu	02:22
5.	"Mírame a los Ojos"	Ablanedo, Boradoni	04:24
6.	"Resbalándote"	Mendez-Guiu	03:27
7.	"Un Pie Tras Otro Pie"	Ablanedo, Boradoni	04:11
8.	"Te Esperaba a Ti"	Ablanedo, Boradoni	04:22
9.	"Tus Besos"	Paula Sánchez, Mendez-Guiu	02:26
10.	"Nunca Te Olvidaré"	Ablanedo, Boradoni	04:40
11.	"Es Una Aventura"	Mendez-Guiu	03:18
12.	"Los Ojos de Tu Madre"	Ablanedo, Boradoni	04:11
13.	"Te Quiero Tanto, Tanto"	Mendez-Guiu	03:11
14.	"Te Quiero Tanto, Tanto (Mi Pequeña Traviesa)"		03:11
