= Clap, el lugar de tus sueños =

Mexican telenovela

- Screenplay by: Jorge Núñez; Javier González; Verónica Ángeles; Gabriela Ortigorza
- Story by: Socorro González; Eduardo Jiménez Pons; Gloria Berruti
- Directed by: Heriberto López de Anda; Eric Morales
- Starring: Ana Layevska; Ari Borovoy; Lidia Ávila; Kika Edgar; Fernanda Castillo; Thaily Amezcua
- Opening theme: "Sin miedo a nada" by Grupo CLAP
- Ending theme: "Estés Donde Estés" by Ha*Ash
- Country of origin: Mexico
- Original language: Spanish
- No. of episodes: 95

Production
- Executive producer: Roberto Gómez Fernández
- Producer: Giselle González
- Cinematography: Heriberto López de Anda; Héctor Márquez
- Editor: Alejandro Becerril
- Production company: Televisa

Original release
- Network: Canal de las Estrellas
- Release: 3 November 2003 – 12 March 2004

Related
- Un paso adelante

Clap, el lugar de tus sueños, is a Mexican telenovela produced by Roberto Gómez Fernández in association with Giselle González Salgado for Televisa in 2003. Is an adaptation of the Spanish series Un paso adelante produced in 2002–05.

Ana Layevska, Ari Borovoy, Lidia Ávila and Kika Edgar star as the protagonists, while Fernanda Castillo, Thaily Amezcua and Luciano Seri star as the antagonists.

== Plot ==
Having been a renowned actress in her youth, Ofelia withdrew from the scenarios after losing their only daughter, who denied their support when he wanted to follow in his footsteps. Now, repentant, Ofelia dedicated his effort and talent to promote and develop the artistic skills of young people who study at your school. But what Ofelia craves above all else is to find his grandson, who disappeared the day that her daughter died giving birth.

== Cast ==
- Ana Layevska as Valentina
- Ari Borovoy as Juan Pablo
- Lidia Ávila as Montserrat
- Kika Edgar as Helena
- Luciano Seri as Tomás
- Fernanda Castillo as Camila
- Damian Mendiola as Fabricio
- Mauricio Martinez as Emiliano
- Thaily Amezcua as Deborah
- Mariana Ávila as Florencia
- Manuel 'Flaco' Ibáñez as Padre Constatino
- Luz María Aguilar as Ofelia
- Eugenio Bartilotti as Neto
- Marlon Castro as Rolando
- Wendy González as Jazmin
- Mauricio Bueno as Eric
- Luz María Jerez as Victoria
- Karen Juantorena as Daniela
- Macaria as Lucia
- Yula Pozo as Juventina
- Rosita Pelayo as Zulema
- Luis Couturier as himself
- Eduardo Liñan as Federico
- Roxana Saucedo as Gracia
- Luis Gatica as Rivadeniera
- Mariana Karr as Alenka
- Polo Ortin as Ezequiel
- Raul Araiza Jr. as Gregorio
- José Luis Reséndez as César
- Martín Ricca as Martín
- Marco Uriel as Valentina's father
