= El Poder de Tu Amor =

Single by Ricardo Montaner

from the album Con la London Metropolitan Orchestra
- Released: 30 July 1999
- Studio: Air Lyndhurst, London, E Besik; Circle House Studio, Miami, FL; Downtime Studio, Miami, FL; New River studio, Fort Lauderdale, FL
- Genre: Latin pop
- Length: 4:28
- Label: Warner Music Latina
- Songwriter: Bebu Silvetti
- Producer: Bebu Silvetti

Ricardo Montaner singles chronology
"Ojala" (1998)	"El Poder de Tu Amor" (1999)	"Ojos Negros" (1999)

"El Poder de Tu Amor" ("The Power of Your Love") is a song by Venezuelan singer Ricardo Montaner from his studio album, Con la London Metropolitan Orchestra (1999). It was written by Bebu Silvetti and is the only original composition for the album. With this song, Montaner achieved his second #1 on the Latin Pop Airplay. A mariachi version of the recorded was also recorded and later included in the Argentine reissue of the album. Ricardo Corres of the Tampa Tribune positively stated that it had "all the requisites of a hit". It was released as the single from the album 30 July 1999. Its music video was filmed at the San Carlos de Borromeo Fortress in Venezuela. It was recognized as one of the best-performing songs of the year at the ASCAP Latin Awards under the pop/ballad category in 2000. The song was covered by cumbia musical group Perla Colombiana and peaked at #3 on the Mexican tropical charts.

== Charts ==
=== Weekly charts ===
Weekly chart positions for "El Poder de Tu Amor"
Chart (1999)	Peak position
US Hot Latin Songs (Billboard)	2
US Latin Pop Airplay (Billboard)	1

=== Year-end charts ===
1999 year-end chart performance for "El Poder de Tu Amor"
Chart (1999)	Position
US Hot Latin Songs (Billboard)	29

== See also ==
- List of Billboard Latin Pop Airplay number ones of 1999
