= Decir Adiós =

Single by Carlos Ponce

from the album Carlos Ponce
- Released: 1998
- Studio: Crescent Moon Studios; Miami, Florida
- Genre: Latin pop
- Length: 4:28
- Label: EMI Latin
- Songwriter: Kike Santander
- Producers: Emilio Estefan; Kike Santander

Carlos Ponce singles chronology
"Rezo" (1998)	"Decir Adiós" (1998)	"Recuerdo" (1998)

"Decir Adiós" ("Say Goodbye) is a song written and co-produced by Kike Santander along with Emilio Estefan and performed by Puerto Rican entertainer Carlos Ponce. It was released as the second single from his 1998 self-titled debut album. The track became his second number one on both the Hot Latin Songs and Latin Pop Airplay charts in the United States. It was acknowledged as an award-winning song at the 2000 BMI Latin Awards. Its music video was filmed in Miami and directed by J.C Barros.

== Charts ==
=== Weekly charts ===
Weekly chart positions for "Decir Adiós"
Chart (1998)	Peak position
US Hot Latin Songs (Billboard)	1
US Latin Pop Airplay (Billboard)	1

=== Year-end charts ===
1998 year-end chart performance for "Decir Adiós"
Chart (1998)	Position
US Hot Latin Songs (Billboard)	39

== See also ==
- List of number-one Billboard Hot Latin Tracks of 1998
- List of Billboard Latin Pop Airplay number ones of 1998
