= Carlos Ponce (album) =

1998 debut studio album by Carlos Ponce

Studio album by Carlos Ponce
- Released: June 2, 1998
- Recorded: 1997–1998
- Studio: Crescent Moon Studios (Miami, Florida, U.S.)
- Genre: Latin pop; soft rock; latin ballad
- Length: 49:40
- Language: Spanish
- Label: EMI Latin
- Producer: Emilio Estefan, Jr.; Kike Santander; Randall M. Barlow; Pablo Flores; Freddy Piñeiro, Jr.; José Miguel Velásquez; Juan Vicente Zambrano

Carlos Ponce chronology
Carlos Ponce (1998)	Todo lo Que Soy (1999)

Singles from Carlos Ponce
- 1. "Rezo" Released: April 6, 1998; 2. "Decir Adiós" Released: July 27, 1998; 3. "Recuerdo" Released: October 5, 1998; 4. "Te Vas" Released: November 16, 1998; 5. "Busco una Mujer" Released: February 8, 1999

Professional ratings
Review scores
Source	Rating
AllMusic	5/5 stars

Carlos Ponce is the eponymous debut studio album recorded by the Puerto Rican-American entertainer, singer-songwriter and actor Carlos Ponce, The album witch released by EMI Latin on June 2, 1998 (see 1998 in music). The album witch produced by Emilio Estefan, Jr., Kike Santander, Randall M. Barlow, Pablo Flores, Freddy Piñeiro, Jr., José Miguel Velásquez and Juan Vicente Zambrano. The album was promoted by its lead singles "Rezo" and "Decir Adios", both of which topped the Hot Latin Tracks and Latin Pop Airplay charts in the United States. At the 1999 Billboard Latin Music Awards, it won Pop Album by a New Artist and was nominated for Pop Album of the Year by a Male Artist, but lost to Vuelve (1998) by Ricky Martin.

== Track listing ==
No.	Title	Writer(s)	Length
1.	"Rezo"	Freddy Piñero, Jr.; Carlos Ponce	4:01
2.	"Recuerdo"	Angie Chirino; Olgui Chirino	3:30
3.	"Morena"	José Miguel Velázquez	3:54
4.	"Será"	A. Chirino; O. Chirino; Ponce	3:47
5.	"Decir Adios"	Kike Santander	4:28
6.	"Todo Por Tu Amor"	Santander	4:20
7.	"Quiero Más"	Santander	4:24
8.	"Amelia"	Marco Flores; Emilio Estefan	5:29
9.	"Te Vas"	Santander	3:51
10.	"Busco una Mujer"	Santander	4:06
11.	"Rezo" (remix)	Piñero, Jr.; Ponce	7:50

== Charts ==
=== Weekly charts ===
Chart (1998)	Peak position
US Top Latin Albums (Billboard)	3
US Latin Pop Albums (Billboard)	2

=== Year-end charts ===
Chart (1998)	Position
US Top Latin Albums (Billboard)	25
US Latin Pop Albums (Billboard)	11
