= Lidia Ávila =

Mexican singer and actress

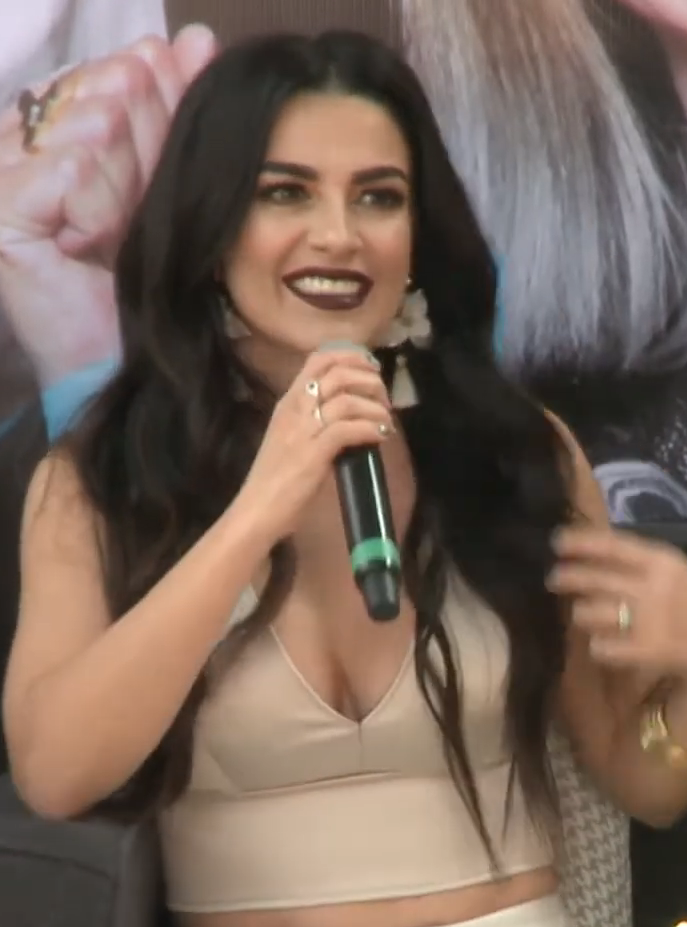
- Born: Lidia Erika Ávila Beltrán; September 13, 1979 (age 46); Puebla, Mexico
- Occupations: Singer, actress
- Years active: 1989–present
- Spouses: Paulo Lauria (m. 2004; div. 2010) Isaac de Hita (m. 2012)
- Children: 3
- Relatives: 5 siblings
- Musical career
- Genres: Pop; Rock; Grupera
- Instrument: Vocals
- Labels: Sony Music Group (2004–2005); Univision Music Group (2005–2008)

Lidia Ávila (born Lidia Erika Ávila Beltrán September 13, 1979, in Puebla) is a Mexican singer and actress.

== Filmography ==
Theater, Film
Year	Title	Role	Notes
1989	Vaselina		Theatrical Performance
2006	Selena, el musical		Theatrical Performance
2006	Cuatro Labios		Film
2007	Los monólogos de la vagina		Theatrical Performance
Telenovelas
Year	Title	Role	Notes
2000	Locura de amor		Special Appearance
2003–04	Clap, el lugar de tus sueños	Montserrat García Zubiria	Protagonist
2006–07	La Fea Más Bella	Herself	Special Appearance
2007–08	Palabra de Mujer	Matilde Solano de Landeta	Protagonist
2010–11	Cuando Me Enamoro	Regina Soberón de Gamba (young)	Special Appearance
