= Rezo (song) =

Single by Carlos Ponce

from the album Carlos Ponce
- Released: May 12, 1998
- Studio: Crescent Moon Studios; Miami, Florida
- Genre: pop; tropical
- Length: 4:28 (album version); 3:36 (single version)
- Label: EMI Latin
- Composers: Carlos Ponce; Freddy Piñero, Jr.
- Lyricist: Carlos Ponce
- Producers: Emilio Estefan; Kike Santander

Carlos Ponce singles chronology
"Rezo" (1998)	"Decir Adiós" (1998)

"Rezo" (English: "I Pray") is a song by Puerto Rican entertainer Carlos Ponce from his 1998 eponymous debut album. The song was co-written by Ponce and Freddy Piñero, Jr. with productions being handled by Emilio Estefan and Kike Santander. It was released as the lead single from the album on May 12, 1998. A pop and tropical power ballad with a gospel chorus, the singer leads a prayer for a woman he desires. A remix of the track was also included in the album. The song received positive reactions from three music journalists.

The song was a recipient of a Broadcast Music, Inc. (BMI) Latin Award in 2000. Commercially, it topped the charts in all the Spanish-speaking countries of Central America as well as the Billboard Hot Latin Songs and Latin Pop Airplay charts in the United States. It also reached number four and three in Colombia and the Mexican ballads charts, respectively. A music video for "Rezo" was filmed and features Mexican model Barbara Coppel. It was nominated in the category of Video of the Year at the 11th Annual Lo Nuestro Awards in 1999.

== Background and composition ==
"Rezo"
A 26-second sample of the chorus, which features a gospel chorus.

Carlos Ponce began his entertainment career as a soap opera actor and played lead roles on Guadalupe (1993) and Sentimientos Ajenos (1996). Ponce also hosted the Spanish-language variety show Control on Univision for three years, which earned him two Ace Awards for Outstanding Host in 1996 and 1997. Ponce had expressed interesting in singing and had asked requested Cuban musician Emilio Estefan to produce his album. "For eight years, I'd been telling Emilio, 'One day, I'll bring you my musical proposal'", Ponce recalled. When Ponce made an appearance Spanish-language talk show El show de Cristina, he was asked to sing. The following day, he received calls from record labels asking Ponce to sign on to their company. Ponce chose to record with EMI Latin citing the label's lack of Latin male balladeers. EMI Latin president José Behar approached Estefan to work with Ponce on the record, which the latter agreed to after listening to the artist's performance. Ponce explained that he wanted to collaborate with Estefan to help him potentially crossover to the English-language market.

Ponce's self-titled debut album was eventually released on May 19, 1998, which AllMusic's Stephen Thomas Erlewine describes as an "engaging, if formulaic, collection of Latin pop". Estefan and Kike Santander handled the record's productions and recording took place at the Crescent Moon Studios in Miami, Florida. One of the four pop sentimental ballads he composed for the album was "Rezo", which was co-written with Freddy Piñero, Jr. and inspired by a poem Ponce once wrote. A "percussive" tropical ballad with a "pop-meets-gospel anthem", A "tale of reticent love", Ponce leads a prayer in which he promises a woman that he desires that she will see "what is it like to live" when she is with him. The song's gospel chorus is performed by students from the Escuela Libre de Música. A club remix of the track was also included on the album.

== Promotion and reception ==
"Rezo" as released as the album's lead single on May 12, 1998. Ponce performed the song live on Sábado Gigante, the "Concert of the Century" at the Miami Arena, and on the promotional tour for the album. Ponce also sung an unplugged Spanglish version on the Live with Regis and Kathie Lee show. The Miami Herald critic Leila Cobo called the track a "crowd-pleaser". Mario Tarradell of the Dallas Morning News stated that "Rezo" is "one of those undeniable songs" and admired Ponce's "passionate" baritone. Writing for the Houston Chronicle, Joey Guerra felt that the track "achieves a genuine sweetness in ballad form" and that its chorus gives it a "soulful flavor". Guerra also complimented the song's remix which he described as "slick". It was acknowledged as an award-winning song at the 2000 BMI Latin Awards. A music video for "Rezo" was filmed which Cobo considered to be "sexy" and features Mexican model Barbara Coppel; it was nominated in the category of Video of the Year at the 11th Annual Lo Nuestro Awards, but lost to "Esperanza" by Enrique Iglesias.

Commercially, the song topped the charts in the Spanish-speaking countries of Central America. It was a top-five hit in Colombia and on the Mexican ballads chart. In the US, "Rezo" debuted at number 17 on the Billboard Hot Latin Songs chart on the week of June 13, 1998. The single reached on top of the chart three weeks later, succeeding "Suavemente" by Elvis Crespo. It spent three consecutive weeks in this position before being replaced by Alejandro Fernández's song "Yo Nací Para Amarte". The track also reached the top of the Latin Pop Airplay chart where it spent a total of eight weeks in this position, tying with Fernández's "No Sé Olvidar" as the longest-leading number song of the year.

== Charts ==
=== Weekly charts ===
Weekly chart positions for "Rezo"
Chart (1998)	Peak position
Colombia (Notimex)	4
Costa Rica (Notimex)	1
El Salvador (Notimex)	1
Guatemala (Notimex)	1
Honduras (Notimex)	1
Mexico Ballads Chart (Notimex)	3
Nicaragua (Notimex)	1
Panama (Notimex)	1
US Hot Latin Songs (Billboard)	1
US Latin Pop Airplay (Billboard)	1

=== Year-end charts ===
1998 year-end chart performance for "Rezo"
Chart (1998)	Position
US Hot Latin Songs (Billboard)	13
US Latin Pop Airplay (Billboard)	11

== Formats and track listings ==
Spanish promotional single

1. Rezo (radio remix) – 4:18
2. Rezo (extended club remix) – 7:47
3. Rezo (dub mix) – 5:43

Spanish promotional single

1. "Rezo" – 3:36

== See also ==
- List of number-one Billboard Hot Latin Tracks of 1998
- List of Billboard Latin Pop Airplay number ones of 1998
