= Carlos Ponce =

Puerto Rican actor

- Ponce at the 27th Annual Latin Grammy Awards, 2026
- Born: Carlos Armando Ponce Freyre Jr. September 4, 1972 (age 54); Santurce, San Juan, Puerto Rico
- Occupations: Actor; singer; television personality; model
- Years active: 1993–present
- Spouses: Verónica Rubio (m. 1996; div. 2010) Karina Banda (m. 2020)
- Partner: Ximena Duque (2010–2016)
- Children: 4
- Musical career
- Genre: Various
- Instrument: Vocals

Carlos Armando Ponce Freyre Jr. (born September 4, 1972) is a Puerto Rican actor, singer, model, and television personality. Ponce began his acting career by participating in Spanish language soap operas for Televisa and Telemundo. Ponce continued to expand his acting career by participating in various American television series. He did not limit himself solely to a career in television. Ponce, who is also a singer, is also active in the American movie industry as a character actor. In film, he played Salvadore in Couples Retreat, Matthew Wright in Spy and Rodrigo in Deuce Bigalow: European Gigolo. In television, he played Felix Gonzalez in Cristela, Max Duran in Hollywood Heights, as well as voicing Santiago Santos in Maya & Miguel.

== Early life ==
Ponce was born in Santurce, Puerto Rico. His parents, Carlos Ponce Sr. and Esther Freyre, emigrated from Cuba after the Cuban Revolution led by Fidel Castro. After his birth, the family moved to Humacao, where Ponce was raised. Ponce is of Spanish descent via his grandparents.

As a child, he actively participated in his school's plays and at home he would often put on a show for the family where he would sing the latest tunes. He has a brother named Francisco Ponce who is Vice President of Telemundo Reality Casting. "Carlitos", as he is known in Puerto Rico, started to appear in television commercials at the age of six. He attended high school in Humacao and was a member of the school's drama club.

In 1986, the Ponce family moved to Miami, Florida, and Ponce continued to participate in his school's productions at South Miami Senior High. He was named the best student actor of the southern region of the United States.

In 1990, Ponce participated in the Southeastern Theatre Conference and competed for the chance to win a scholarship. He won and enrolled in the New World School of the Arts conservatory. However, the Spanish-language television station Univision offered Ponce the opportunity to host a show called Hablando (Talking). This was his first serious television debut and after his debut he gave up his university studies.

== Career ==
=== Acting ===
After Hablando came to its end, Ponce went to Mexico to visit a friend. While there he visited the Televisa television station. The talent director of the station met Ponce and offered Ponce his first role in a soap opera: Guadalupe, starring Adela Noriega and Eduardo Yáñez. He participated in another soap opera for Televisa, Sentimientos Ajenos, in which he played the main character. Ponce also sang the theme song for the production. He received the "Actor Revelation of 1997 Award" by Eres magazine and named "Best Actor" by TV y Novelas magazine (both are Mexican publications).

In between productions, Ponce returned to Miami and Univision hired him as the host of a new show, Control. He hosted the show for three years and won an "ACE Award".

In 2003, Ponce joined Entertainment Tonight as a correspondent. He also hosted An Entertainment Tonight Event — Celebrity Weddings Unveiled, a CBS primetime special. Ponce hosted the 2006 Miss Universe pageant in Los Angeles, with Shandi Finnessey, Nancy O'Dell and Carson Kressley. In 2007, he starred in the Telemundo NBC Universal telenovela Dame Chocolate (Give Me Chocolate) alongside Génesis Rodríguez and Karla Monroig. Ponce also starred in Perro Amor in 2010 on the same network. In 2012, Ponce began hosting the hit Puerto Rican singing competition for kids on Wapa Television called Idol Kids Puerto Rico. In 2013, Ponce appeared on Telemundo's Santa Diabla as Humberto Cano.

==== American film industry ====
In 1998, he made his debut in American television with his participation in the TV series Beverly Hills, 90210 and 7th Heaven, in the latter of which he played the husband of Jessica Biel's character Mary Camden. He also made guest appearances in Live with Regis and Kathie Lee and in Donny & Marie.

In 2003, Ponce played himself in the movie Chasing Papi alongside fellow Latinos: Puerto Ricans Roselyn Sánchez, Lisa Vidal, Walter Mercado, Colombian actress Sofía Vergara, and Latin pop singer Jaci Velásquez. After this experience, he went to New Zealand to film Meet Me in Miami.

In 2005, Ponce briefly appeared in the movie Deuce Bigalow: European Gigolo.

In 2006, Ponce participated in the controversial recording of the Spanish-language version of the Star-Spangled Banner, called "Nuestro Himno", alongside Wyclef Jean, Gloria Trevi, and Olga Tañón. He hosted the Miss Universe 2006 pageant in Los Angeles, along with Nancy O'Dell and Carson Kressley. He also appeared in the movie Just My Luck, with Lindsay Lohan, Chris Pine, and McFly.

In 2008, Ponce starred as a celebrity judge alongside actress and singer María Conchita Alonso on VH1's reality series ¡Viva Hollywood!, which featured twelve Latino actors competing for the title of "America's Numero Uno Telenovela Star".

In 2009, Ponce starred in the second season of Lipstick Jungle, where he played a character named Rodrigo. He later stated that he accepted the role because it could "benefit" his career. Also that year, he appeared in Couples Retreat as a yoga instructor.

From 2014 to 2015, Ponce co-starred in the ABC comedy Cristela as Felix, the male lead on the show.

In 2020, Carlos appeared in Julie and the Phantoms as the titular character's father, Ray Molina.

=== Music ===
External audio
- You may listen to Carlos Ponce's "Rezo" here
- and to his "Escuchame" here

In 1998, Emilio Estefan Jr. and Kike Santander signed Ponce to a record contract. His first album was entitled Carlos Ponce, and included three of his own compositions. The album reached the #1 spot in the Latin Billboards for nine weeks in the Hispanic community of the United States. It also reached the #1 spot in Central America and South America. He was awarded a Double Platinum Award for the sales which his album generated.

On the Billboard Hot Latin Tracks Carlos Ponce reached the number-one spot three times with "Rezo" (I Pray), "Decir Adiós" (Say Good-Bye) and "Escúchame" (Listen to Me).

In 1999, Ponce recorded his second studio album, Todo lo que Soy (Everything that I Am). The 1999 World Championships in Athletics held in Seville, Spain, adopted the song "Amelia" from Ponce's second album as its official theme. That same year, he was contracted by the Walt Disney Studios to sing "Bella Notte" for the animated film Lady and the Tramp II: Scamp's Adventure. He also appeared in ABC's drama series Once and Again.

After the tragedy of the September 11, 2001 attacks, Ponce joined a group of 100 Latin American singers, who united to pay tribute to the victims by recording "Último Adiós" ("Last Good-Bye"). The proceeds of the recording were donated to families of the victims. That same year Ponce participated in the Televisa production Sin Pecado Concebido, along with Mexican actress Angélica Rivera. In 2002, he recorded his third studio album, Ponce; later that year he signed a contract with Telemundo to host a reality show called Protagonista de la Musica, which became one of the most popular Hispanic programs in the U.S. and Puerto Rico.

== Personal life ==
Ponce married his high school sweetheart, photographer Verónica Rubio, the sister of current U.S. Secretary of State Marco Rubio. They resided in Miami, Florida, with their four children: Giancarlo (born 1999), Sebastián (born 2001), and twins Savannah and Sienna (born 2002). In 2010, the couple divorced.

From 2010 to 2016, he was in a relationship with Colombian actress Ximena Duque.

In 2018, he began a relationship with Mexican television host Karina Banda. They married in December 2020.

== Filmography ==
Film roles
Year	Title	Role	Notes
2001	Lady and the Tramp II: Scamp's Adventure	End Title Song	Voice only
2005	Deuce Bigalow: European Gigolo	Rodrigo	
2005	Meet Me in Miami	Luis	
2005	Complete Guide to Guys	Steve	
2006	Just My Luck	Antonio	
2009	Couples Retreat	Salvadore	
2011	Rio	Marcel	Voice only
2013	Free Birds	Narrator / Alejandro	Voice only
2014	The Pirate Fairy	Bonito	Voice only
2015	Spy	Matthew Wright	
2016	Ice Age: Collision Course	Mariachi Beaver	Voice only
2023	Murder Mystery 2	The pilot	

Television roles
Year	Title	Roles	Notes
1993–1994	Guadalupe	Willie	
1996–1997	Sentimientos ajenos	Renato Aramendia	Main role; 98 episodes
1998	Beverly Hills, 90210	Tom Savin	Episode: "Confession"
1998–2006	7th Heaven	Carlos Rivera	12 episodes
2000	Milagros	Himself	Episode 19
2001	Once and Again	Giancarlo	Episode: "The Other End of the Telescope"
2001	Sin pecado concebido	Adrián Martorel Ibáñez	Main role; 90 episodes
2003	Karen Sisco	Will	Episode: "The One That Got Away"
2003	Ángel de la guarda, mi dulce compañía	Gustavo Almansa	Main role; 122 episodes
2004	Eve	Joe	Episode: "Above Average Joe"
2006	Stranded	Chief Inspector Raddimus	Television film
2006	Vanished	Cured corna	Television film
2006	Break-in	Inspector Raddimus	Television film
2007	Dame chocolate	Bruce Remington	Main role; 149 episodes
2008	Lipstick Jungle	Rodrigo Vega	4 episodes
2010	Perro amor	Antonio "El Perro" Brando	Main role; 129 episodes
2011–2012	Dos hogares	Santiago Ballesteros Ortiz / Jesús	Main role; 145 episodes
2012	Hollywood Heights	Max Duran	Series regular; 29 episodes
2013	Arranque de pasión	Chceco Fernández	Main role; 6 episodes
2013–2014	Santa Diabla	Humberto Cano	Main role; 136 episodes
2014–2015	Cristela	Felix	Main role; 22 episodes
2016	Telenovela	Diego	Episode: "The Rivals"
2016	Devious Maids	Benjamin Pacheco	6 episodes
2016–2017	Silvana sin lana	Manuel Gallardo	Main role; 120 episodes
2017	La Fan	Luis Alberto Fontán	1 episode
2017	Major Crimes	Emilio Diaz	5 episodes
2018-2020	The Boss Baby: Back in Business	Board Baby Emiliano	Episode: "As the Diaper Changes"; Episode: "Bossa Nova"
2019	Playing with Fire	Jorge Jaramillo	Main role; 10 episodes
2020	La Doña	León Contreras	Main role
2020	Julie and the Phantoms	Ray Molina	Recurring role; 7 episodes
2021	La suerte de Loli	Armando	Main cast
2021	Luis Miguel: The Series	Adult Miguel Alemán	Season 3
2021–present	Los Lopeggs	Yema	Main voice role; Spanish-language
2021	Por amor o por dinero	Himself	Host
2022–2023	Amores que engañan	Jorge Ricardo	Episode: "Vientre en alquiler" Episode: "Durmiendo con un extraño"
2023	Enamorándonos: la isla	Himself	Host
2025	Velvet: El nuevo imperio	Esteban Márquez	
2026	Top Chef VIP	Himself	Contestant (season 5)

== Audiobooks ==
Voice-over work
Year	Title	Role	Notes
2019	Harry Potter	All roles	Spanish only

== Discography ==
- 2012: Me Llevas
- 2010: Perro Amor
- 2005: Celebrando 15 Años Con
- 2003: La Historia
- 2002: Ponce
- 1999: Todo lo Que Soy
- 1998: Carlos Ponce

== Soundtrack ==
- 2011: "Rendirme En Tu Amor" feat. Anahí (telenovela Dos Hogares)
- 2013: "Santa Diabla" feat. Aaron Diaz (telenovela Santa Diabla)

== Billboard Hot Latin Tracks chart chronology ==
Year	Single	Peak
1998	"Rezo"	1
1998	"Decir Adiós"	1
1999	"Recuerdo"	31
1999	"Te Vas"	10
1999	"Escúchame"	1
1999	"Busco una Mujer"	26
2000	"La Razón de mi Ser"	18
2002	"Mujer con Pantalones"	15

== Awards ==
In 1999, Ponce received many awards, including:

- "Best Pop Album" from Billboard magazine
- "Artist Revelation" from Premios Lo Nuestro and
- "Pop Ballad Revelation of the Year" from Premios Tu Musica de Puerto Rico.

== See also ==
- List of Puerto Ricans
- List of Puerto Rican songwriters
- List of composers by nationality
- List of television presenters/Puerto Rico
