= OV7 =

Mexican pop group

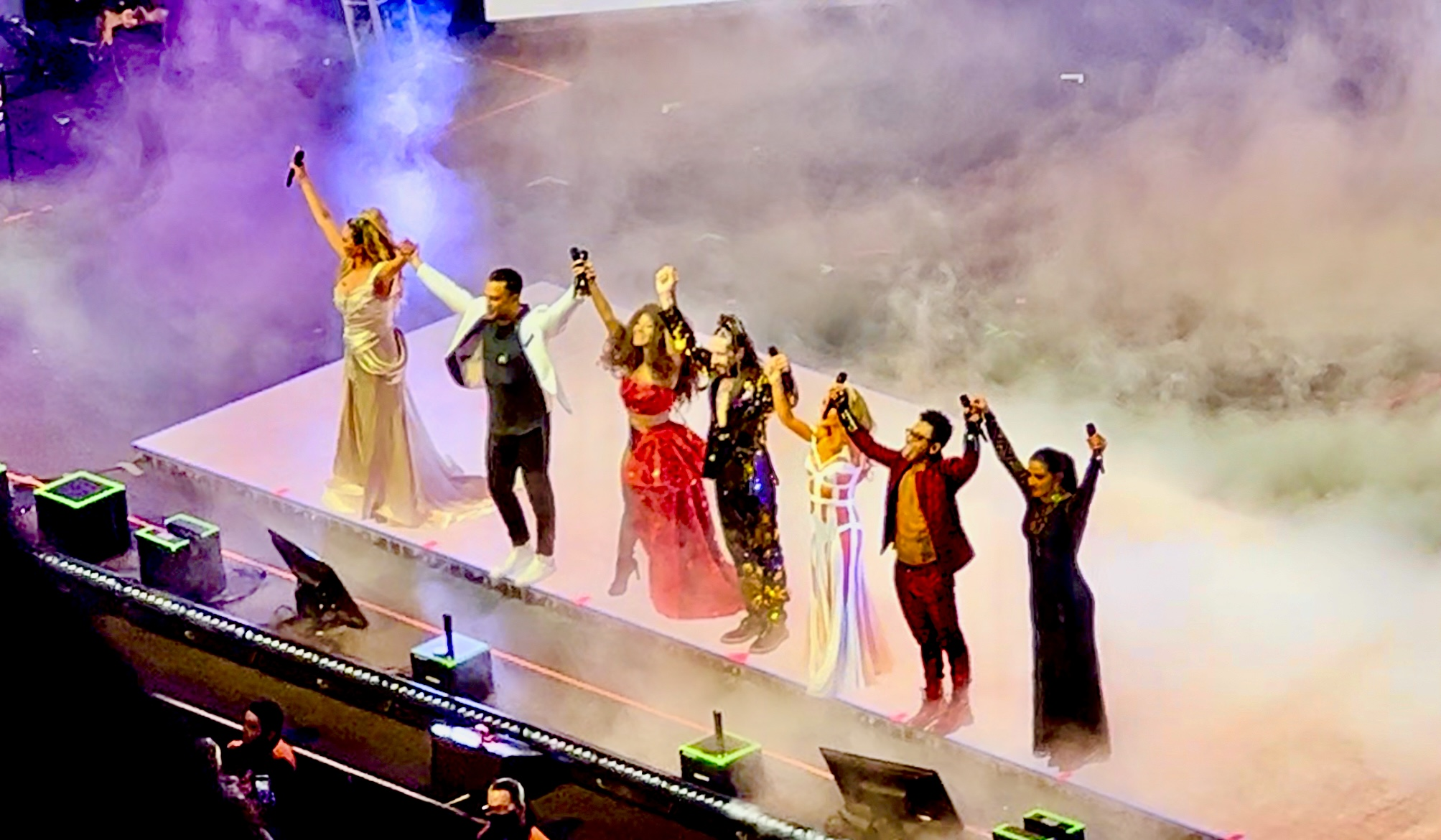
- OV7 celebrating one of their 30 year anniversary concerts, at Guadalajara, Jalisco. Mexico. (September, 2022)

Background information
- Also known as: La Onda Vaselina
- Origin: Mexico
- Genres: Latin pop
- Instrument: Vocals
- Years active: 1989–2003; 2010–2023; 2026-Present Day
- Labels: Melody; Fonovisa; Columbia; Epic; RCA; Sony Music
- Members: Kalimba Marichal; Ari Borovoy; Lidia Ávila; Mariana Ochoa; Érika Zaba Beltrán; Oscar Schwebel Arizmendi; M'Balia Marichal
- Past members: (see below)

OV7, formerly known as La Onda Vaselina, was a Mexican Latin pop group formed in 1989. With a career spanning more than 30 years and several hits in the Latin American markets, OV7 remains as one of the most successful acts in Latin pop history.

The group disbanded in 2003. In 2010 they reunited. In 2023, the band announced they were disbanding for an indefinite period.

== History ==
=== 1989–1993: Formation of La Onda Vaselina, Success with three albums, touring ===
OV7 followed a trend that began in the 1980s by another pop group named Timbiriche. In 1989, Mexican singer and producer Julissa decided to make her own version of Grease ("Vaselina" in Spanish) after Grease's theatrical play's season finished in Mexico. Julissa decided to form a group based on the play. After the development of Timbuktu, she founded "La Onda Vaselina." Shortly after they recorded their successful debut album, with singles "Que Buen Reventón" (their first single) and "Que Triste Es El Primer Adios" (a cover of Neil Sedaka's hit "Breaking Up Is Hard to Do") which became big hits in the early 1990s. With her first album they sold over 100,000 copies and had a successful tour. Their second album Onda Vaselina 2 was one of the most successful albums of the '90s in Mexico with popular hits that became public property such as "El Calendario" and "Voy Voy Voy". Their next album was Dulces Para Ti which was followed by a series of live shows in one of Mexico City's main venues for the Teatro Aldama. The album's biggest hits was "Tu Seras Mi Baby" and "La Llorona Loca".

=== 1995–1998: La Band Rock, Touring, Indefinite Hiatus ===
Their fourth album was a Regional Mexican Music album named La Banda Rock (The Rock Band, using the word "Banda" both meaning "musical group" and the Mexican music genre), the biggest hit of the album was the song "Pongánse botas, quitense tennis" (Put some boots on and lose the tennis shoes). The group has also had several hits in Spain from the album.

OV7 took a long break after that and then came back with a more mature sound during adolescence They came out with Hoy (Today), an album that was targeted for the teen market featured alternative rock songs mixed with pop and strong texts Hits were "Sube y Baja" and "Perdon". The album flopped and the group decided to take a long pause in which they also considered a split.

=== 1997–2003: Comeback as OV7, CD00, American debut, Disbandment ===
In 1997, Onda Vaselina made a huge comeback with a strong album that made history in the Mexican charts: Entrega Total. The album sent the group back to the # 1 spot not only in Mexico but the rest of Latin America. The hits were "Mirame A Los Ojos," "Un Pie Tras Otro Pie," and "Te Quiero Tanto Tanto" which reached # 1 on the Billboard Latin chart is still present in both songs being played at clubs and weddings throughout Latin America, the group also toured and filled the Auditorio Nacional 4 times while they released their album Vuela Más Alto which had the hit "No es Obsesión". After "Vuela Más Alto," Onda Vaselina decided to take a break and ended their relationship with their manager and creator Julissa.

After 8 years passed and Onda Vaselina was ready to come back without Julissa. For legal reasons, changed their name to OV7 (accounting for Onda Vaselina and 7 for the number of members) and released their first single "Enloquéceme" and their album CD00. Around this time, they filled the Auditorio Nacional 10 times at the time reached 1st place in all of Latin America with the singles "Shabadabada," "Más Que Amor," "Jam," and "Enloquéceme." The album sold 2 million copies in Mexico and included an English-speaking song, "Angelica", which was never released.

OV7 tried to make the crossover to English-speakers with an English version of their new single "Love Colada" which was the first single from their album Siete Latidos (Seven Beats). The song was released only promo in North America and because of the group's problems with Televisa they appeared on the Latin American average success. The group was invited to participate in the 2002 World Cup Official Album with the track "Bringing The World Back Home".

In November 2002 the Group announced plans to split on the live TV show Operacion Triunfo, followed by a greatest hits CD, Punto, in 2003. OV7 had a farewell tour and officially split up on June 14, 2003, after 14 years of being together.

=== Past members ===
- Mariana Yolanda Ochoa Reyes: 1989–2003, 2010–2023.
- Ari Borovoy Hoffman: 1989–2003, 2010–2023.
- Lidia Érika Ávila Beltrán: 1991–2003, 2010–2023.
- Érika Zaba Beltrán: 1989–2003, 2010–2023.
- Oscar Schwebel Arizmendi: 1989–2003, 2010–2023.
- M'balia Marichal Ibar, 1989–2003, 2010–2011, 2020-2023.
- Kalimba Kadjaly Marichal Ibar, 1993–1994, 2000–2003,2020-2023.
- Daniel Isaías Vázquez Sánchez, 1989–1992, 1995–1999.
- Anna Borras Canadel, 1989–1990.
- Ariatna Leticia Martínez Vargas, 1989–1993.
- Rodrigo Álvarez Saviñon, 1989–1993.
- Luis García Carranza, 1989–1994.
- Bárbara Macías Sánchez, 1990, 1993–1994.
- Gonzalo Alva, 1992
- Liliana Ríos Iñurreta, 1993–1994
- Alejandro Sirvent Barton, 1992–1994.
- Jair Roman de Rubin, 1993–1994.

== Tours ==
- OV7 Treinta Tour (2022-2023)

2022
Date	City	Country	Venue
September 1	Monterrey	Mexico	Citibanamex
September 2	Monterrey	Mexico	Citibanamex
September 6	Mexico City	Mexico	Auditorio Nacional
September 7	Mexico City	Mexico	Auditorio Nacional
September 8	Mexico City	Mexico	Auditorio Nacional
September 17	Acapulco	Mexico	Arena GNP
September 22	Guadalajara	Mexico	Auditorio Telmex
September 23	Guadalajara	Mexico	Auditorio Telmex
September 24	Guadalajara	Mexico	Auditorio Telmex
September 30	Saltillo	Mexico	
October 1	Aguascalientes	Mexico	Arena San Marcos
October 7	San Luis Potosí	Mexico	El Domo
October 8	Torreón	Mexico	Coliseo Centenario
October 13	Oaxaca	Mexico	
October 15	Morelia	Mexico	Plaza de Toros
October 17	Pachuca	Mexico	
October 21	Veracruz	Mexico	WTC
October 25	Mexico City	Mexico	Auditorio Nacional
October 26	Mexico City	Mexico	Auditorio Nacional
October 29	Villahermosa	Mexico	
November 4	Merida	Mexico	Auditorio GNP
November 11	León	Mexico	Velaria de la Feria
November 12	Puebla	Mexico	Auditorio GNP
November 18	Mexicali	Mexico	
November 19	Tijuana	Mexico	
November 26	Querétaro	Mexico	Centro de Congresos
December 2	San Jose	United States	
December 3	Los Angeles	United States	Dodger Stadium (Bésame Mucho Fest)
2023
Date	City	Country	Venue
March 2	San Antonio	United States	Majestic Theater
March 3	Laredo	United States	Sames Auto Arena
March 4	Hidalgo	United States	Payne Arena
March 9	Houston	United States	Bayou Music Center
March 10	Irving	United States	The Pavilion at Toyota Music Factory
March 11	El Paso	United States	County Coliseum
March 12	Phoenix	United States	Celebrity Theater
March 17	Las Vega	United States	The Pearl
March 18	Los Angeles	United States	YouTube Theater
March 19	Stockton	United States	Bob Hope Theater
March 24	Chicago	United States	The Rosemont
March 26	New York City	United States	The Palladium
April 29	Mexico City	Mexico	Auditorio Nacional
April 30	Mexico City	Mexico	Auditorio Nacional
May 2	Aguascalientes	Mexico	Palenque de la Feria
May 4	Monterrey	Mexico	Domo Care
May 6	Acapulco	Mexico	Arena GNP
May 12	Zapopan	Mexico	Auditorio Telmex
May 13	Zapopan	Mexico	Auditorio Telmex
May 25	Mérida	Mexico	Foro GNP Seguros
May 27	Cancún	Mexico	Estadio Beto Avila
June 2	Pachuca	Mexico	Auditorio Explanada
June 8	Guatemala City	Guatemala	Fórum Majadas
June 10	San Salvador	El Salvador	Complejo Cuscatlán
August 18	Mexico City	Mexico	Auditorio Nacional
August 26	Pueblas de Zaragoza	Mexico	Auditorio Metropolitano
October 7	Los Mochis	Mexico	Centro de Usos Multilples
November 3	San Diego	United States	Cal Coast Credit Union Open Air Theater
November 4	Riverside	United States	Riverside Municipal Auditorium
November 5	San Jose	United States	San Jose Civic
November 9	Charlotte	United States	Ovens Auditorium
November 10	Atlanta	United States	Tabernacle
November 12	Miami	United States	James L. Knight Center

== Discography ==
=== Albums as La Onda Vaselina ===
Studio albums

- La Onda Vaselina (1989)
- La Onda Vaselina, Vol. 2 (1991)
- Dulces Para Ti (1992)
- La Banda Rock (1993)
- Hoy (1995)
- Entrega Total (1997)
- Vuela Más Alto (1998)

Compilation albums

- 16 Kilates Musicales (1994)
- Música Compacta (1994)
- Línea de Oro: Qué Triste Es El Primer Adiós (1995)
- Línea de Oro: La Banda Rock (1995)
- La Onda Vaselina: Hacia El Milenio (1999)
- Préndete con Lo Mejor de Onda Vaselina: Onda Naranja Fanta (1999)
- Antología Musical de La Onda Vaselina (2000)
- La Historia Musical de La Onda Vaselina (2001)
- La Onda Vaselina: La Trayectoria (2004)
- La Onda Vaselina 3pack (2008)
- La Más Completa Colección (2009)
- Las Número 1: La Onda Vaselina (2010)
- Simplemente Lo Mejor de La Onda Vaselina (2010)
- La Historia (2011)
- 16 Éxitos de Oro (2012)

=== Albums as OV7 ===
Studio albums

- CD00 (2000)
- Siete Latidos (2001)
- Punto (2003)
- Forever 7 (2012)
- A Tu Lado (2013)

Live Albums

- OV7 En Directo – Rush (2001)
- Primera Fila (2010)
- En Vivo Desde El Palacio de Los Deportes (2011)
- OV7 & Kabah: En Vivo (2015)
- 90's Pop Tour (2017)

Compilation albums

- Punto OV7 (2003)
- Combo de Éxitos (2006)
- Lo Mejor de OV7 (2006)
- Personalidad OV7 (2015)

=== Singles ===
Title	Year	Chart Positions				
Title	Year	EU	MEX	SP	ARG	VEN
"Que Buen Reventón"	1989	–	–	–	–	–
"Mi Novio Volvió"	1989	–	–	–	–	–
"Vamos Al Mar"	1989	–	–	–	–	–
"Que Triste Es El Primer Adios"	1990	–	8	14	21	18
"Susanita Tiene Un Ratón"	1990	–	15	–	–	–
"El Calendario"	1991	–	12	–	–	–
"Me Siento Beethoven"	1991	–	–	–	–	–
"El Oso Corredor"	1991	–	–	–	–	–
"Voy Voy Voy"	1992	–	32	–	–	–
"México A Bailar"	1992	–	19	–	–	–
"Tu Seras Mi Baby"	1992	–	–	–	–	–
"La Llorona Loca"	1993	–	–	–	–	–
"Juego del Amor"	1993	–	–	–	–	–
"Ponganse Botas, Quitense Tenis"	1993	–	38	–	–	–
"El Pachangon"	1994	–	–	–	–	–
"La Cucaracha"	1994	–	–	–	–	–
"Tomás"	1994	–	–	–	–	–
"Perdon"	1995	–	13	8	–	–
"Sube y Baja"	1995	–	78	15	–	–
"Hoy"	1995	–	–	18	–	–
"Mirame A Los Ojos"	1997	–	1	1	1	1
"Un Pie Tras Otro Pie"	1997	–	1	1	5	4
"Aunque Muera Por Ti"	1997	–	8	12	–	13
"Te Quiero Tanto Tanto"	1998	1	1	1	1	1
"Tus Besos"	1998	–	5	8	13	2
"Vuela Más Alto"	1998	–	1	3	1	2
"No Es Obsesión"	1999	–	1	1	1	4
"Caleidoscopico"	1999	–	6	9	15	11
"Desconectate"	1999	–	18	13	–	–
"Enloquéceme"	2000	4	1	1	1	1
"Shabadabada"	2000	9	1	1	1	1
"Más Que Amor"	2000	–	1	3	4	2
"Jam"	2000	–	8	10	4	9
"Rush"	2001	–	16	21	–	–
"Shake Shake"	2001	–	4	3	7	10
"Love Colada"	2001	–	2	3	1	5
"Aum, Aum"	2002	–	1	2	6	2
"Te Necesito"	2002	–	2	7	1	4
"Tengo el Control"	2002	–	–	18	–	–
"No Me Voy"	2003	–	1	2	1	1
"Prohibido Quererme"	2010	–	3	–	2	5
"Confieso"	2011	–	2	–	9	6
"Vuela Mas Alto (En Primera Fila)"	2011	–	18	–	–	–
"Te Quiero Tanto, Tanto (En Primera Fila)"	2011	–	–	–	–	–
"En Algun Lado"	2011	–	14	–	–	–
"Magia"	2012	–	4	–	–	–
"Prisioneros"	2012	–	–	–	–	–
"Nada Es Imposible (Maniac) (Ft. Gloria Trevi)"	2012	–	–	–	–	–
"Golpe De Calor (single promo)"	2013	–	–	–	–	–
"Tenemos un Secreto"	2013	–	–	–	–	–
"Desintoxicada"	2014	–	–	–	–	–
"No Me Digas Nada"	2014	–	–	–	–	–
"Quédate"	2023	–	–	–	–	
"Si Es Amor"	2023	–	–	–	–	

- Oxígeno: 3.rd sencillo publicado el 8 de junio de 2023.
- Para terminar: 4.º sencillo publicado el 18 de agosto de 2023.
