= Chayanne discography =

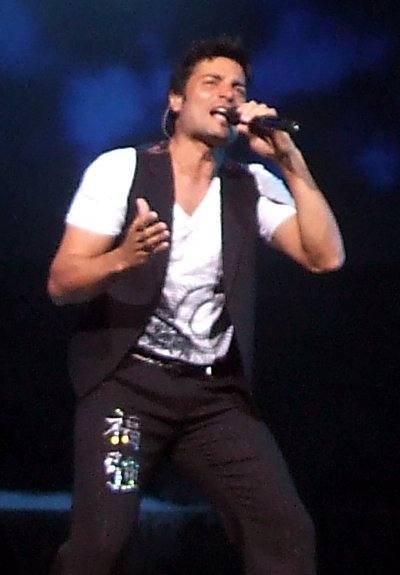
- Studio albums: 16
- Live albums: 2
- Compilation albums: 5
- Singles: 60
- Music videos: 63

The discography of Puerto Rican Latin pop singer Chayanne includes 16 studio albums, 3 compilation albums and 2 live albums. Chayanne's albums have sold over 30 million albums worldwide. 5 of his albums have charted on the Billboard 200 chart and he has had 5 number 1 albums on the US Latin Billboard charts. Many of his albums have been certified platinum with Atado a Tu Amor being certified 5× platinum in Argentina for selling over 500,000 copies. The album was also certified gold in the United States. In addition to the albums, Chayanne has released 60 singles and 58 music videos. Throughout his career, Chayanne has been signed to record labels, Sony Music and RCA Records.

== Albums ==
=== Studio albums ===
Title	Album details	Peak chart positions				Sales	Certifications
Title	Album details	MEX	SPA	US	US Latin	Sales	Certifications
Chayanne es mi Nombre	Released: 1984; Label: RCA Ariola	—	—	—	—		
Sangre Latina	Released: 1986; Label: RCA Ariola	—	—	—	—		
Chayanne	Released: 1987; Label: CBS Columbia	—	—	—	—		
Chayanne II	Released: November 22, 1988; Label: CBS Discos	—	—	—	—		AMPROFON: 2× Platinum
Tiempo de Vals	Released: August 7, 1990; Label: CBS Discos	—	—	—	—	WW: 1,000,000	AMPROFON: Platinum+Gold
Provócame	Released: August 14, 1992; Label: CBS Columbia	—	—	—	36		AMPROFON: Gold
Influencias	Released: September 27, 1994; Label: Sony	—	—	—	26		AMPROFON: Gold
Volver a Nacer	Released: September 17, 1996; Label: CBS Discos	—	—	—	33	ARG: 200,000	AMPROFON: Gold; CAPIF: 2× Platinum
Atado a Tu Amor	Released: September 29, 1998; Label: CBS Discos	—	—	—	4	ARG: 500,000; WW: 2,500,000	AMPROFON: 2× Platinum; CAPIF: 6× Platinum; PROMUSICAE: 7× Platinum; RIAA: Gold
Simplemente	Released: October 3, 2000; Label: CBS Discos	—	—	—	3	ARG: 200,000; WW: 400,000	AMPROFON: Platinum+Gold; CAPIF: 2× Platinum; PROMUSICAE: 2× Platinum; RIAA: 2× Platinum (Latin)
Sincero	Released: August 26, 2003; Label: CBS Discos	—	—	87	1	ARG: 120,000; WW: 400,000	AMPROFON: 2× Platinum+Gold; CAPIF: 3× Platinum; PROMUSICAE: Platinum; RIAA: 2× Platinum (Latin)
Cautivo	Released: September 27, 2005; Label: Sony BMG Norte	—	7	62	1	ARG: 40,000; WW: 400,000	AMPROFON: Platinum; CAPIF: Platinum; PROMUSICAE: Platinum; RIAA: 2× Platinum (Latin)
Mi Tiempo	Released: April 10, 2007; Label: Sony BMG Norte	6	6	42	2	ARG: 40,000; WW: 400,000	AMPROFON: Gold; CAPIF: Platinum; PROMUSICAE: Gold; RIAA: Platinum (Latin)
No hay imposibles	Released: February 23, 2010; Label: Sony Music Latin	1	2	23	1	ARG: 100,000; MEX: 70,000; US: 153,470; WW: 450,000	AMPROFON: 2× Platinum; CAPIF: Gold; RIAA: Platinum (Latin)
En Todo Estaré	Released: August 25, 2014; Label: Sony Music Latin	1	1	23	1		AMPROFON: 2× Platinum; CAPIF: Platinum; RIAA: Gold (Latin)
Bailemos Otra Vez	Released: October 27, 2023; Label: Sony Music Latin	—	26	—	35		RIAA: Platinum (Latin)

=== Live albums ===
Title	Album details	Peak chart positions			Sales	Certifications
Title	Album details	MEX	SPA	US Latin	Sales	Certifications
Chayanne: Vivo	Released: October 28, 2008; Label: Sony Music Latin	4	36	31	ARG: 40,000	AMPROFON: Platinum+Gold; CAPIF: Gold
A Solas Con Chayanne	Released: February 7, 2012; Label: Sony Music Latin	—	—	10		AMPROFON: Platinum+Gold

=== Compilation albums ===
Title	Album details	Peak chart positions			Sales	Certifications
Title	Album details	SPA	US	US Latin	Sales	Certifications
Grandes Éxitos	Released: March 19, 2002; Label: Sony Discos	41	199	1	ARG: 80,000; WW: 400,000	AMPROFON: Platinum; CAPIF: 2× Platinum; PROMUSICAE: 3× Platinum; RIAA: 2× Platinum (Latin)
Desde Siempre	Released: March 29, 2005; Label: Sony BMG	4	182	8	ARG: 40,000	AMPROFON: Gold; CAPIF: Platinum
De Piel A Piel	Released: September 9, 2008; Label: Sony Music	—	—	—		

== Singles ==
Title	Year		Peak chart positions				Album
Title	Year	MEX Esp. Air.	SPA	US Bubb.	US Latin	US Latin Pop	Album
"Chayanne es mi nombre"	1984	—	—	—	—	—	Chayanne es mi nombre
"¿Y que culpa tengo yo?"	1984	—	—	—	—	—	Chayanne es mi nombre
"Vuelve"	1986	—	—	—	24	—	Sangre Latina
"Una foto para dos"	1986	—	—	—	—	—	Sangre Latina
"Fiesta En América"	1987	—	—	—	4	—	Chayanne '87
"Peligro de Amor"	1988	—	—	—	4	—	Chayanne '87
"Te Deseo"	1988	—	—	—	43	—	Chayanne '87
"Tu Pirata Soy Yo"	1988	—	—	—	4	—	Chayanne II
"Este Ritmo Se Baila Así"	1989	—	—	—	3	—	Chayanne II
"Fuiste un Trozo de Hielo en la Escarcha"	1989	—	—	—	1	—	Chayanne II
"Fantasias"	1990	—	—	—	8	—	Chayanne II
"Completamente Enamorados"	1990	—	—	—	1	—	Tiempo de Vals
"Simon Sez"	1990	—	—	—	16	—	Tiempo de Vals
"Daria Cualquier Cosa"	1990	—	—	—	21	—	Tiempo de Vals
"Tiempo de Vals"	1991	—	—	—	7	—	Tiempo de Vals
"El Centro de Mi Corazón"	1992	—	—	—	1	—	Provócame
"Provócame"	1992	—	—	—	4	—	Provócame
"Extasis"	1993	—	—	—	2	—	Provócame
"Isla Desnuda"	1993	—	—	—	15	—	Provócame
"Mi Primer Amor"	1993	—	—	—	8	—	Provócame
"Querida"	1994	—	—	—	24	9	Influencias
"Gavilan O Paloma"	1995	—	—	—	24	6	Influencias
"Solamente Tu Amor"	1996	—	—	—	6	1	Volver a Nacer
"Tal Vez Es Amor"	1997	—	—	—	12	4	Volver a Nacer
"Volver a Nacer"	1997	—	—	—	10	3	Volver a Nacer
"Refugio de Amor (You Are My Home)" (duet with Vanessa Williams)	1998	—	—	—	3	4	Dance with Me: Music from the Motion Picture
"Dejaría Todo"	1998	—	—	—	1	1	Atado a Tu Amor
"Atado a Tu Amor"	1999	—	—	—	8	2	Atado a Tu Amor
"Pienso en Ti"	1999	—	—	—	15	7	Atado a Tu Amor
"Salomé"	1999	—	1	—	19	9	Atado a Tu Amor
"Soy Como un Niño"	1999	—	—	—	—	23	Atado a Tu Amor
"Boom Boom"	2000	—	1	—	—	—	Simplemente
"Yo Te Amo"	2000	—	—	22	1	1	Simplemente
"Ay, Mamá"	2001	—	9	—	—	—	Simplemente
"Candela"	2001	—	—	—	8	4	Simplemente
"Simplemente"	2001	—	—	—	—	27	Simplemente
"Torero"	2002	—	1	—	—	36	Grandes Exitos
"Y Tu Te Vas"	2002	—	—	8	1	1	Grandes Exitos
"Un Siglo Sin Ti"	2003	—	—	20	1	1	Sincero
"Caprichosa"	2003	—	—	—	—	—	Sincero
"Cuidarte el Alma"	2003	—	—	18	1	1	Sincero
"Sentada Aquí en Mi Alma"	2004	—	—	—	9	4	Sincero
"Contra Vientos y Mareas"	2005	—	—	24	6	3	Desde Siempre
"No Sé Por Qué"	2005	—	—	—	16	4	Cautivo
"No Te Preocupes Por Mí"	2006	—	—	25	6	1	Cautivo
"Te Echo De Menos"	2006	—	—	—	15	2	Cautivo
"Si Nos Quedara Poco Tiempo"	2007	—	—	13	1	1	Mi Tiempo
"Tengo Miedo"	2007	—	—	—	—	27	Mi Tiempo
"Lola"	2007	—	—	—	30	13	Mi Tiempo
"Amor Inmortal"	2008	—	—	5	2	7	De Piel a Piel
"Me Enamoré de Ti"	2010	3	11	24	6	3	No Hay Imposibles
"Tu Boca"	2010	12	—	—	12	15	No Hay Imposibles
"Si No Estas"	2010	11	—	—	30	12	No Hay Imposibles
"Humanos a Marte"	2014	1	8	—	9	3	En Todo Estaré
"Tú Respiracion"	2014	1	—	—	18	7	En Todo Estaré
"Madre Tierra (Oye)"	2015	21	54	—	30	7	En Todo Estaré
"Que Me Has Hecho" (featuring Wisin)	2017	6	83	—	25	7	Non-album singles
"Choka Choka" (featuring Ozuna)	2018	9	—	—	41	12	Non-album singles
"Di Qué Sientes Tú"	2018	8	—	—	—	16	Non-album singles
"Te Amo y Punto"	2022	1	—	—	—	6	Bailemos Otra Vez
"Como Tú y Yo"	2022	—	—	—	—	7	Bailemos Otra Vez
"Bailando Bachata"	2023	—	25	—	48	—	Bailemos Otra Vez
"Necesito Un Segundo"	2023	—	—	—	—	6	Bailemos Otra Vez

== Music videos ==
Music videos
Album	Videos
Chayanne Es Mi Nombre	"Chayanne Es Mi Nombre" "Un Juego Nuevo" "¿Y Que Culpa Tengo Yo?"
Sangre Latina	"Vuelve" "Una Foto Para Dos" "Jana"
Chayanne (1987)	"Fiesta En América" "Digo No" "Para Tenerte Otra Vez" "Peligro de Amor" "Tu y Yo" "Violeta" "Te Deseo" "Una Luna Para Dos"
Chayanne (1988)	"Tu Pirata Soy Yo" "Fuiste un Trozo de Hielo en la Escarcha" "Este Ritmo Se Baila Asi" "Fantasias"
Tiempo de Vals	"Completamente Enamorados" "Daria Cualquier Cosa" "Simon Sez" "Tiempo de Vals"
Provócame	"Provócame (Live)" "El Centro de Mi Corazon (Live)"
Volver a Nacer	"Solamente Tu Amor" "Volver A Nacer" "Tal Vez Es Amor (Live)" "Baila Baila (Memé's Boriqua Radio Edit)" "Solo Pienso En Ti (Live)" "Guajira"
Atado a Tu Amor	"Dejaria Todo" "Atado a Tu Amor" "Refugio de Amor (with Vanessa Williams)" "Salome"
Simplemente	"Candela" "Yo Te Amo" "Ay Mama" "Vivo/Alive" "Boom Boom"
Grandes Éxitos	"Y Tu Te Vas" "Torero"
Sincero	"Sentada Aqui En Mi Alma" "Caprichosa" "Un Siglo Sin Ti" "Santa Sofia (Live)"
Desde Siempre	"Contra Vientos y Mareas"
Cautivo	"Te Echo de Menos" "No Te Preocupes Por Mi" "No Se Por Que"
Mi Tiempo	"Si Nos Quedara Poco Tiempo" "Lola" "Tengo miedo"
De Piel A Piel	"Amor Inmortal"
No Hay Imposibles	"Si No Estás" "Me Enamoré De Ti" "Me Enamoré De Ti (Performance Version)" "Tu Boca"
En Todo Estaré	"Madre Tierra (Oye)" "Humanos a Marte" "Tu Respiración"
No album	"Que Me Has Hecho (feat. Wisin)" "Choka Choka (feat. Ozuna)" "Di Qué Sientes Tú"
Other Songs	"You Are My Home (with Vanessa Williams)"
Bailemos Otra Vez	"Te Amo y Punto" "Como Tú y Yo" "Bailando Bachata" "Necesito Un Segundo"

== Other songs and duets ==
- "Una Luna Para Dos" from the original edition of the album "Chayanne" (1987).
- "Não Posso Mais Viver Assim". Appears in the Portuguese language version of "Chayanne" (1987).
- "Pata Pata" (duet with Miriam Makeba) from the album "Chayanne" (1988).
- "Danza Sara" from the film Linda Sara.
- "Jingle Bell Rock". Appears in Navidad en las Américas (1994).
- "Hey Jude" (with various artists) & "Michelle". Appears in Hey Jude: Tributo a los Beatles.
- "Toque de Magia" (duet with Angelica). Appears in Angelica.
- "You Are My Home" & "Refugio de Amor" (duet with Vanessa Williams). Appears in Dance with Me original soundtrack.
- "La Múcura/La Cocaleca. Appears in "Siempre Piel Canela" from "Banco Popular de PR".
- "Caminando Caminando" (duet with Anna Oxa). Appears in Senza Pieta.
- "Cuando un Amor Se Va" (duet with Rubén Blades) & "Dame (Touch Me)" (duet with Jennifer Lopez) from the album Simplemente.
- "Donde Va Tu Sueño (Where the Dream Takes You)" from the Atlantis: The Lost Empire soundtrack.
- "Veo En Ti La Luz" (duet with Danna Paola) from the soundtrack to the Spanish-language version of the film Tangled.
- "Amor Inmortal" from the telenovela Gabriel.
- "Me Enamoré De Ti" from the 2009 telenovela Corazon Salvaje.
- Tu respiracion from the 2015 telenovela Lo imperdonable.
- "Amorcito Corazón" from the telenovela Amorcito Corazón (original song of Pedro Infante).
- "The Best Is Yet To Come" (duet with Tony Bennett) from the latter's Viva Duets.
