= List of awards and nominations received by Chayanne =

Chayanne awards and nominations
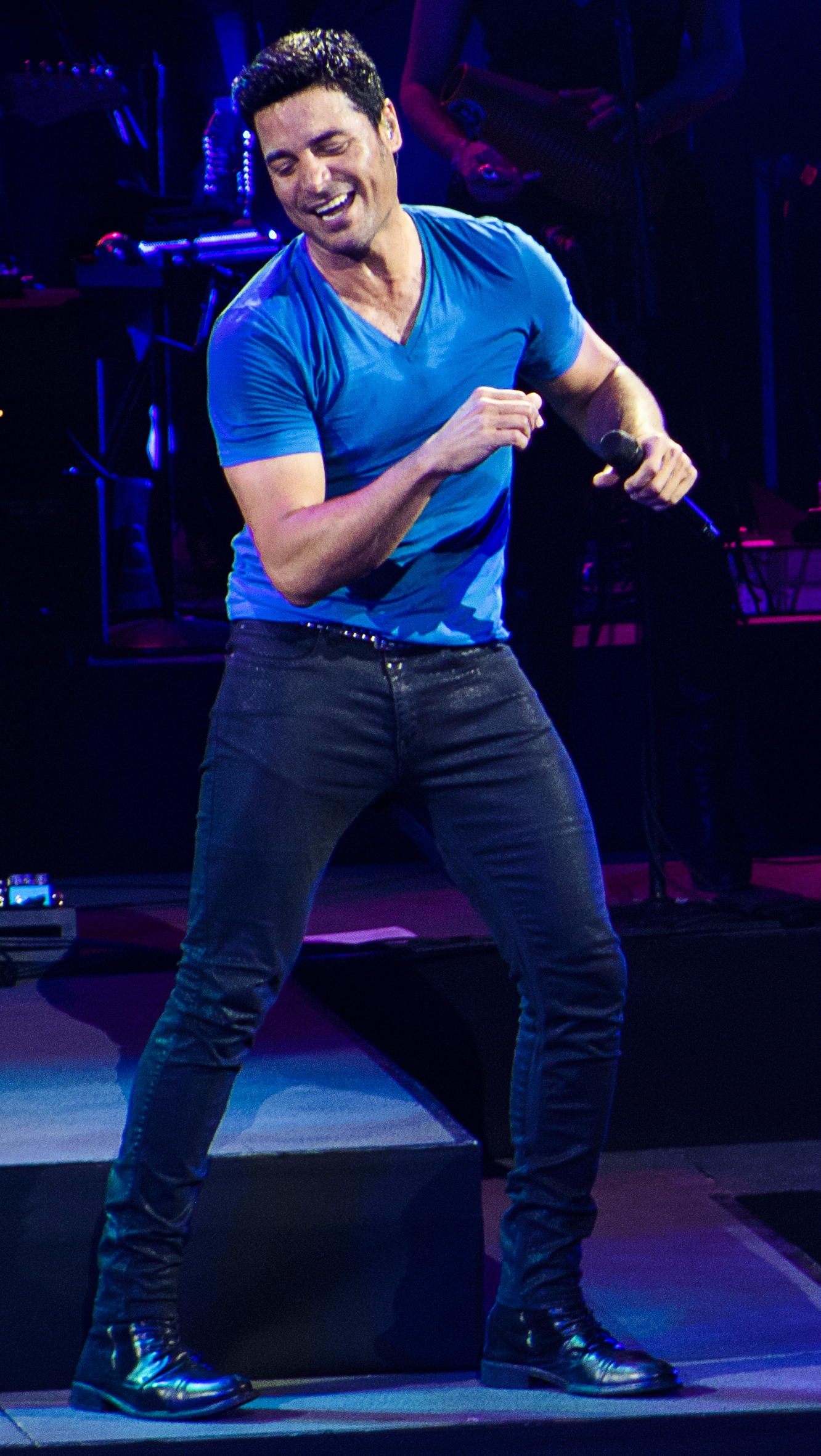
- Chayanne in 2016
Awards and nominations
| Award | Wins | Nominations |
| Billboard Latin Music Awards | 7 | 23 |
| BMI Latin Awards | 8 | 8 |
| Latin American Music Awards | 0 | 6 |
| Grammy Awards/Latin Grammy Awards | 0 | 7 |
| Lo Nuestro Awards | 6 | 33 |
| Premios Juventud | 11 | 42 |
| World Music Awards | 0 | 1 |

Totals (Note: Certain award groups do not simply award one winner. They acknowledge several different recipients, have runners-up, and have third place. Since this is a specific recognition and is different from losing an award, runner-up mentions are considered wins in this award tally. For simplification and to avoid errors, each award in this list has been presumed to have had a prior nomination.)
- Wins: 103
- Nominations: 239

Puerto Rican singer, dancer and actor Chayanne has won various national and international accolades through his career. He is one of the best-selling Latin singers.

Chayanne won his first awards in Puerto Rico in the mid-1980s and began to receive major accolades at the end of the decade, including nominations at the Billboard Number One Awards. In addition, he became the first Latin artist to receive a MTV Video Music Awards in 1989. He consolidated his career in the 1990s, achieving awards and nominations in major ceremonies, including Grammy Awards and Lo Nuestro Awards. As early as 1991, TV Chilean named him Artist of the Decade. He is also a Latin Grammy Awards nominee. His career has been recognized by various organizations, including a Lo Nuestro Excellence Award (2010), Premios Oye!'s Lifetime Award (2012) and a Billboard's Icon Award (2022).

His touring career has proved to be successful and is one of the highest-grossing Latin artists according to Billboard Boxscore. In 2011, Chayanne became the artist with most appearances in the history of the Viña del Mar International Song Festival. (Note: As of 2024, he is second behind Miguel Bosé.) He won prizes given in each of his appearances: 1988, 1991, 1998, 2000, 2002, 2008, 2011, and 2015. In addition, he became the first recipient of the Gaviota de la Paz (Gull of Peace) in 1991, and won various "Most Popular" or "Best Singer" Awards in the event. In 2021, a survey named him as the All-time Most Popular Artist in the festival history.

Outside of his work in music, Chayanne garnered nominations for his forays in films, including at the Association of Latin Entertainment Critics (Latin ACE) and ALMA Award for Dance with Me (1998). His charitable endeavours has been also recognized, including a iHeartRadio Fiesta Latina's Corazón Latino Award (2023), and a Crystal Cross Award given by the American Red Cross in 2018.

== Awards and nominations ==
| Award/organization (Note: Charts are not included, unless they are explicitly described as "awards" or specific trophies are given.) | Year | Nominee/work | Category | Result | Ref. |
|---|---|---|---|---|---|
| Agüeybana de Oro (Puerto Rico) | 1989 | Chayanne | Best Artist of the Year | Won | |
| Agüeybana de Oro (Puerto Rico) | 1990 | Chayanne | Best Artist of the Year | Won | |
| ALMA Award | 1999 | Chayanne (Dance with Me) | Outstanding Actor in a Feature Film | Nominated | |
| ALMA Award | 1999 | "You Are My Home" | Outstanding Performance of a Song for a Feature Film | Nominated | |
| American Red Cross | 2018 | Chayanne | Crystal Cross Award | Honoree | |
| Amigo Awards | 1999 | Chayanne | Latin Male Artist | Won | |
| Amigo Awards | 1999 | Chayanne | Latin Newcomer Artist | Won | |
| Amigo Awards | 1999 | Atado a Tu Amor | Latin Album of the Year | Nominated | |
| Association of Latin Entertainment Critics (Latin ACE) | 1988 | Chayanne | Best Male Artist | Won | |
| Association of Latin Entertainment Critics (Latin ACE) | 1990 | Chayanne | Best Video Music Artist | Won | |
| Association of Latin Entertainment Critics (Latin ACE) | 1994 | Chayanne (Radio City Music Hall) | Best Concert | Won | |
| Association of Latin Entertainment Critics (Latin ACE) | 1996 | Chayanne | Outstanding Male Artist | Won | |
| Association of Latin Entertainment Critics (Latin ACE) | 1997 | Chayanne | Singer of the Year | Nominated | |
| Association of Latin Entertainment Critics (Latin ACE) | 1998 | Chayanne | Extraordinary ACE Award | Honoree | |
| Association of Latin Entertainment Critics (Latin ACE) | 1999 | Chayanne (Dance with Me) | Best Actor | Nominated | |
| BDSCertified Spin Award | 2003 | "Y Tu Te Vas" | 50,000 Spins | Won | |
| BDSCertified Spin Award | 2003 | "Yo Te Amo" | 50,000 Spins | Won | |
| BDSCertified Spin Award | 2005 | "Un Siglo Sin Ti" | 50,000 Spins | Won | |
| Billboard Latin Music Awards | 2001 | Simplemente | Pop Album of the Year, Male | Nominated | |
| Billboard Latin Music Awards | 2001 | "Atado A Tu Amor" | Pop Track of the Year | Nominated | |
| Billboard Latin Music Awards | 2003 | "Y Tu Te Vas" | Hot Latin Track of the Year | Won | |
| Billboard Latin Music Awards | 2003 | "Y Tu Te Vas" | Latin Pop Airplay Track of the Year, Male | Won | |
| Billboard Latin Music Awards | 2003 | Grandes Éxitos | Latin Greatest Hits Album of the Year | Won | |
| Billboard Latin Music Awards | 2004 | "Un Siglo Sin Ti" | Hot Latin Track of the Year | Nominated | |
| Billboard Latin Music Awards | 2004 | "Un Siglo Sin Ti" | Latin Pop Airplay Track of the Year, Male | Nominated | |
| Billboard Latin Music Awards | 2004 | Sincero | Latin Pop Album of the Year, Male: | Nominated | |
| Billboard Latin Music Awards | 2005 | "Cuidarte El Alma" | Latin Pop Airplay Track of the Year, Male | Nominated | |
| Billboard Latin Music Awards | 2006 | Cautivo | Latin Pop Album of the Year, Male | Nominated | |
| Billboard Latin Music Awards | 2006 | Marc Anthony, Alejandro Fernández and Chayanne | Latin Tour of the Year | Nominated | |
| Billboard Latin Music Awards | 2007 | "No Se Por Qué" | Latin Pop Airplay Song of the Year, Male | Nominated | |
| Billboard Latin Music Awards | 2008 | "Si Nos Quedara Poco Tiempo" | Latin Pop Airplay Song of the Year, Male | Won | |
| Billboard Latin Music Awards | 2011 | Chayanne | Latin Pop Airplay Artist of the Year, Solo | Nominated | |
| Billboard Latin Music Awards | 2011 | Chayanne | Latin Pop Albums Artist of the Year, Solo | Nominated | |
| Billboard Latin Music Awards | 2011 | Chayanne | Latin Touring Artist of the Year | Won | |
| Billboard Latin Music Awards | 2013 | GIGANT3S: Marc Anthony, Chayanne and Marco Antonio Solís | Tour of the Year | Nominated | |
| Billboard Latin Music Awards | 2015 | Chayanne | Latin Pop Albums Artist of the Year, Solo | Nominated | |
| Billboard Latin Music Awards | 2015 | "Humanos A Marte" | Latin Pop Song of the Year | Nominated | |
| Billboard Latin Music Awards | 2015 | En Todo Estaré | Latin Pop Album of the Year | Nominated | |
| Billboard Latin Music Awards | 2020 | Desde el Alma Tour | Tour of the Year | Won | |
| Billboard Latin Music Awards | 2022 | Chayanne | Icon Award | Honoree | |
| Billboard Latin Music Awards | 2024 | Bailemos Otra Vez | Latin Pop Album of the Year | Nominated | |
| Billboard Music Video Awards | 1990 | Chayanne | Best Male Latin Artist | Nominated | |
| Billboard Number One Awards (Note: Prior to the inauguration of the Billboard Music Awards in 1990, the magazine had the "Number One Awards" to honor the top-performing artists of the year on each of chart categories.) | 1989 | Chayanne | Top Pop Latin Album | Nominated | |
| Billboard Number One Awards | 1989 | Chayanne | Top Pop Latin Artist | Nominated | |
| Billboard Number One Awards | 1989 | "Este Ritmo Se Baila Así" | Top Hot Latin Track | Nominated | |
| Billboard Number One Awards | 1989 | "Tu Pirata Soy Yo" | Top Hot Latin Track | Nominated | |
| BMI Latin Awards | 2000 | "Dejaría Todo" | Award-winning songs | Won | |
| BMI Latin Awards | 2001 | "Atado A Tu Amor" | Award-winning songs | Won | |
| BMI Latin Awards | 2002 | "Yo Te Amo" | Award-winning songs | Won | |
| BMI Latin Awards | 2005 | "Cuidarte El Alma" | Award-winning songs | Won | |
| BMI Latin Awards | 2007 | "No Te Preocupes Por Mí" | Songs List | Won | |
| BMI Latin Awards | 2011 | "Me enamoré de ti" | Award-winning songs | Won | |
| BMI Latin Awards | 2012 | "Tu Boca" | Award-winning songs | Won | |
| BMI Latin Awards | 2016 | "Humanos a Marte" | Award-winning songs | Won | |
| Cadena Dial Awards | 2007 | Chayanne | Dial Awards 2006 | Won | |
| Casandra Awards (a.k.a. Soberano Awards) | 2006 | Chayanne | Soberano International | Honoree | |
| Desi Entertainment Award | 1997 | Chayanne | —N/a | Nominated | |
| Disco México magazine Award | 1993 | "Completamente Enamorados" | Best International Ballad | Won | |
| Eres Awards | 1998 | Chayanne | —N/a | Nominated | |
| Fan Choice Awards (Mexico) (Note: A Mexican fan-voted award.) | 2023 | Chayanne | Pop Artist of the Year | Nominated | |
| Festival Internacional de la Orquídea | 1989 | Chayanne | Silver Orchid (Orquídea de Plata) | Silver | |
| Festival Internacional de la Orquídea | 1994 | Chayanne | Gold Orchid (Orquídea de Oro) | Gold | |
| Festival Internacional de la Orquídea | 2003 | Chayanne | Diamond Orchid (Orquídea de Diamante) | Diamond | |
| FM2 Station (Miami) | 1989 | Chayanne | Revelation Artist of the Year | Won | |
| Globo Awards (New York) (Note: transl. Globe Awards) | 2000 | Atado a Tu Amor | Best Pop Album — Male Artist | Won | |
| Grammy Awards | 1990 | Chayanne | Best Latin Pop Performance | Nominated | |
| Grammy Awards | 1999 | Atado a Tu Amor | Best Latin Pop Performance | Nominated | |
| Grammy Awards | 2002 | Simplemente | Best Latin Pop Album | Nominated | |
| Grammy Awards | 2004 | Sincero | Best Latin Pop Album | Nominated | |
| Heat Latin Music Awards | 2024 | Chayanne | Best Male Singer | Nominated | |
| HTV Awards | 2005 | Chayanne | —N/a | Nominated | |
| iHeartRadio Fiesta Latina | 2023 | Chayanne | Corazón Latino Award | Honoree | |
| International Association of Press, Radio and Television | 2015 | Chayanne | Diamond Award | Honoree | |
| Latin American Music Awards | 2015 | Chayanne | Favorite Pop/Rock Male Artist | Nominated | |
| Latin American Music Awards | 2019 | Chayanne | Favorite Tour | Nominated | |
| Latin American Music Awards | 2023 | Te Amo y Punto | Tour of the Year | Nominated | |
| Latin American Music Awards | 2024 | "Bailando Bachata" | Favorite Tropical Song | Nominated | |
| Latin American Music Awards | 2024 | "Bailando Bachata" | Song of the Year | Nominated | |
| Latin American Music Awards | 2024 | Bailemos Otra Vez | Favorite Pop Album | Nominated | |
| Latin Grammy Awards | 2003 | "Torero" | Best Music Video | Nominated | |
| Latin Grammy Awards | 2006 | Cautivo | Album of the Year | Nominated | |
| Latin Grammy Awards | 2006 | Cautivo | Best Male Pop Vocal Album | Nominated | |
| Latin Grammy Awards | 2006 | "Te Echo De Menos" | Best Short Form Music Video | Nominated | |
| Lo Nuestro Awards | 1990 | Chayanne | Pop Male Artist of the Year | Won | |
| Lo Nuestro Awards | 1990 | Chayanne | Pop Album of the Year | Nominated | |
| Lo Nuestro Awards | 1991 | "Completamente Enamorados" | Pop Song of the Year | Nominated | |
| Lo Nuestro Awards | 1993 | Chayanne | Pop Male Artist of the Year | Nominated | |
| Lo Nuestro Awards | 1993 | "El Centro de Mi Corazón" | Pop Song of the Year | Nominated | |
| Lo Nuestro Awards | 1997 | "Volver a Nacer" | Video of the Year | Nominated | |
| Lo Nuestro Awards | 1999 | Atado a Tu Amor | Pop Album of the Year | Nominated | |
| Lo Nuestro Awards | 1999 | "Dejaría Todo" | Pop Song of the Year | Nominated | |
| Lo Nuestro Awards | 2000 | Chayanne | Pop Male Artist of the Year | Nominated | |
| Lo Nuestro Awards | 2001 | Chayanne | Jóvenes con Legado (Youth Legacy Award) | Honoree | |
| Lo Nuestro Awards | 2001 | "Atado a Tu Amor" | Pop Song of the Year | Nominated | |
| Lo Nuestro Awards | 2003 | Chayanne | Pop Male Artist of the Year | Nominated | |
| Lo Nuestro Awards | 2003 | "Y Tú Te Vas" | Pop Song of the Year | Nominated | |
| Lo Nuestro Awards | 2005 | Chayanne | Pop Male Artist of the Year | Won | |
| Lo Nuestro Awards | 2005 | "Cuidarte el alma" | Pop Song of the Year | Nominated | |
| Lo Nuestro Awards | 2007 | Chayanne | Pop Male Artist of the Year | Nominated | |
| Lo Nuestro Awards | 2007 | "Te Echo de Menos" | Pop Song of the Year | Nominated | |
| Lo Nuestro Awards | 2008 | Chayanne | Pop Male Artist of the Year | Won | |
| Lo Nuestro Awards | 2009 | Chayanne | Pop Male Artist of the Year | Nominated | |
| Lo Nuestro Awards | 2010 | Chayanne | Excellence Award | Honoree | |
| Lo Nuestro Awards | 2011 | Chayanne | Pop Male Artist of the Year | Nominated | |
| Lo Nuestro Awards | 2011 | No Hay Imposibles | Pop Album of the Year | Nominated | |
| Lo Nuestro Awards | 2011 | "Me enamoré de ti" | Pop Song of the Year | Nominated | |
| Lo Nuestro Awards | 2012 | Chayanne | Pop Male Artist of the Year | Nominated | |
| Lo Nuestro Awards | 2015 | "Tu Respiración" | Video of the Year | Nominated | |
| Lo Nuestro Awards | 2016 | Chayanne | Pop Male Artist of the Year | Nominated | |
| Lo Nuestro Awards | 2020 | Chayanne | Pop/Ballad Artist of the Year | Nominated | |
| Lo Nuestro Awards | 2020 | Desde El Alma Tour | Tour of the Year | Nominated | |
| Lo Nuestro Awards | 2023 | Chayanne | Pop Male Artist of the Year | Nominated | |
| Lo Nuestro Awards | 2023 | "Te Amo y Punto" | Pop Song of the Year | Nominated | |
| Lo Nuestro Awards | 2024 | "Bailando Bachata" | Tropical Song of the Year | Won | |
| Lo Nuestro Awards | 2024 | "Como Tú y Yo" | Pop Song of the Year | Nominated | |
| Lo Nuestro Awards | 2025 | "Necesito Un Segundo" | Mariachi/Ranchera Song Of The Year | Nominated | |
| Lunas del Auditorio | 2007 | Chayanne | Best Spanish Pop | Nominated | |
| Lunas del Auditorio | 2008 | Chayanne | Best Spanish Pop | Nominated | |
| Lunas del Auditorio | 2011 | Chayanne | Best Spanish Pop | Nominated | |
| Lunas del Auditorio | 2015 | Chayanne | Best Spanish Pop | Nominated | |
| Lunas del Auditorio | 2016 | Chayanne | Best Spanish Pop | Nominated | |
| Miami carnival | 1991 | Chayanne | King of the Carnival | Won | |
| Miami Life Awards | 2007 | Chayanne | International Male Artist | Nominated | |
| Miami Life Awards | 2007 | Los Tres Caballeros (Chayanne/Alejandro Fernández/Marc Anthony) | Concert of the Year | Nominated | |
| Monitor Latino Awards | 2010 | Chayanne | Solo Male Pop Artist | Nominated | |
| Monitor Latino Awards | 2010 | Chayanne | Tour of the Year | Nominated | |
| Monitor Latino Awards | 2010 | "Me enamoré de ti" | Pop Song of the Year, Male Artist | Nominated | |
| Monitor Latino Awards | 2010 | No Hay Imposibles | Pop Album of the Year, Male Artist | Nominated | |
| Movistar Arena (Chile) | 2015 | Chayanne | Artist of the Year | Won | |
| Movistar Arena (Chile) | 2015 | Chayanne | Walk of Stars | Won | |
| MTV Video Music Awards | 1989 | "Este Ritmo Se Baila Así" | International Viewer's Choice: MTV Internacional | Won | |
| Orgullosamente Latino Award | 2008 | Chayanne | Latin Career Award | Nominated | |
| Orgullosamente Latino Award | 2009 | Chayanne | Latin Career Award | Won | |
| Paoli Awards (Puerto Rico) (Note: An award established in Puerto Rico in 1983.) | 1985 | Chayanne | Young Singer of the Year | Won | |
| Paoli Awards (Puerto Rico) | 1989 | Chayanne | Best Show | Won | |
| People en Español Awards | 2010 | Chayanne | Comeback of the Year | Won | |
| People en Español Awards | 2010 | Chayanne | Best Dressed, Male | Won | |
| People en Español Awards | 2010 | "Me enamoré de ti" | Best Song of the Year | Nominated | |
| Pepsi International | 1988 | Chayanne | ALA Award | Won | |
| Premios Aplauso 92 | 1988 | Chayanne | Best Young Artist | Won | |
| Premios Bravo | 1988 | Chayanne | Best New Artist | Nominated | |
| Premios Bravo | 1988 | Chayanne | Pop/Rock Male Artist | Nominated | |
| Premios Bravo | 1990 | Chayanne | Best Young Artist | Nominated | |
| Premios Cemí (Puerto Rico) | 1989 | Chayanne | Best Artist of the Year | Won | |
| Premios INTRE (Puerto Rico) | 1990 | Chayanne | Dedication Award | Won | |
| Premios Gardel | 2001 | Simplemente | Best Latin Album, Male | Nominated | |
| Premios Juventud | 2004 | Chayanne | Best Moves | Won | |
| Premios Juventud | 2004 | Chayanne | Voice of the Moment | Nominated | |
| Premios Juventud | 2004 | Chayanne | He's Got Style | Won | |
| Premios Juventud | 2004 | Chayanne | What a Hottie! | Won | |
| Premios Juventud | 2004 | Chayanne | Can He Act or What? | Nominated | |
| Premios Juventud | 2004 | Chayanne | My Idol Is... | Nominated | |
| Premios Juventud | 2004 | Chayanne and Vanessa Williams | Dynamic Duet | Nominated | |
| Premios Juventud | 2004 | Sincero | CD To Die For | Nominated | |
| Premios Juventud | 2005 | Chayanne | Best Moves | Nominated | |
| Premios Juventud | 2005 | Chayanne | I Hear Him Everywhere | Nominated | |
| Premios Juventud | 2005 | Chayanne | Favorite Pop Artist | Nominated | |
| Premios Juventud | 2005 | Chayanne | He's Got Style | Nominated | |
| Premios Juventud | 2005 | Chayanne | What a Hottie! | Nominated | |
| Premios Juventud | 2005 | Chayanne | Supernova Award | Honoree | |
| Premios Juventud | 2006 | Chayanne | Best Moves | Nominated | |
| Premios Juventud | 2006 | Chayanne | Favorite Pop Star | Nominated | |
| Premios Juventud | 2006 | Chayanne | He's Got Style | Nominated | |
| Premios Juventud | 2006 | Chayanne | What a Hottie! | Nominated | |
| Premios Juventud | 2006 | Chayanne | My Favorite Concert | Nominated | |
| Premios Juventud | 2007 | Chayanne | Best Moves | Nominated | |
| Premios Juventud | 2007 | Chayanne | He's Got Style | Nominated | |
| Premios Juventud | 2007 | Chayanne | What a Hottie! | Nominated | |
| Premios Juventud | 2008 | Chayanne | Best Moves | Won | |
| Premios Juventud | 2009 | Chayanne | Best Moves | Won | |
| Premios Juventud | 2010 | Chayanne | Best Moves | Won | |
| Premios Juventud | 2010 | Chayanne | Favorite Pop Artist | Won | |
| Premios Juventud | 2010 | Chayanne | My Idol Is | Won | |
| Premios Juventud | 2010 | Chayanne | Voice of the Moment | Nominated | |
| Premios Juventud | 2010 | Chayanne | What a Hottie! | Nominated | |
| Premios Juventud | 2010 | "Me enamoré de ti" | Catchiest Tune | Nominated | |
| Premios Juventud | 2010 | "Me enamoré de ti" | Best Ballad | Nominated | |
| Premios Juventud | 2010 | "Me enamoré de ti" | My Favorite Video | Nominated | |
| Premios Juventud | 2010 | No Hay Imposibles | CD To Die For | Nominated | |
| Premios Juventud | 2011 | Chayanne | Best Moves | Nominated | |
| Premios Juventud | 2011 | No Hay Imposibles Tour | Super Tour | Nominated | |
| Premios Juventud | 2011 | "Me enamoré de ti" | Best Telenovela Musical Theme | Nominated | |
| Premios Juventud | 2012 | Chayanne | Best Moves | Nominated | |
| Premios Juventud | 2013 | Chayanne | Best Moves | Nominated | |
| Premios Juventud | 2016 | "Tu Respiración" | Best Telenovela Musical Theme | Won | |
| Premios Juventud | 2023 | "Te Amo y Punto" | Best Pop Track | Nominated | |
| Premios Juventud | 2024 | "Bailando Bachata" | Best Tropical Hit | Won | |
| Premios Juventud | 2024 | Bailemos Otra Vez | Best Pop/Urban Album | Nominated | |
| Premios Oye! | 2002 | "Y Tu te Vas" | Song of the Year | Nominated | |
| Premios Oye! | 2007 | Chayanne | Best Male Pop Artist | Nominated | |
| Premios Oye! | 2009 | Chayanne | Best Male Pop Artist | Nominated | |
| Premios Oye! | 2010 | "Me enamoré de ti" | Theme from a Telenovela, Movie or T.V. Series | Nominated | |
| Premios Oye! | 2010 | Chayanne | Best Male Pop Artist | Nominated | |
| Premios Oye! | 2012 | Chayanne | Lifetime Award | Honoree | |
| Ronda Awards (Venezuela) | 1994 | Chayanne | —N/a | Nominated | |
| Premios Tú Música (Puerto Rico) | 2003 | Chayanne | Artist of the Year | Won | |
| Puerto Rico Walk of Fame | 2015 | Chayanne | Walk of Star | Won | |
| Quiero Awards (Argentina) | 2010 | "Si no estás" | Melodic Video of the Year | Nominated | |
| Quiero Awards (Argentina) | 2014 | "Humanos a Marte" | Video of the Year | Nominated | |
| Quiero Awards (Argentina) | 2018 | "Di Que Sientes Tu" | Melodic Video of the Year | Nominated | |
| Ritmo Latino Awards (Note: Also known as "Premio de la Gente" or Latin Music Fan Awards.) | 1999 | Chayanne | Best Artist | Nominated | |
| Ritmo Latino Awards | 2000 | Chayanne | Best Artist | Won | |
| Ritmo Latino Awards | 2000 | "Atado A Tu Amor" | Video of the Year | Won | |
| Ritmo Latino Awards | 2001 | Chayanne | Best Male Pop Artist | Won | |
| Ritmo Latino Awards | 2001 | Chayanne | Most Popular Artist in the U.S. | Nominated | |
| Ritmo Latino Awards | 2004 | Chayanne | Male Pop Artist or Group of the Year | Won | |
| Ritmo Latino Awards | 2004 | Chayanne | Composer of the Year, Male/Female | Nominated | |
| Ritmo Latino Awards | 2004 | "Un Siglo Sin Ti" | Video of the Year | Won | |
| RTVE Disco del Año Gala (Spain) | 2010 | No Hay Imposibles | Album of the Year | Nominated | |
| Súper Q Station (Miami) | 1989 | Chayanne | Revelation Artist of the Year | Honoree | |
| Telehit Awards | 2010 | Chayanne | Performer of the Year | Nominated | |
| Telehit Awards | 2010 | Chayanne | Artist of the Year | Nominated | |
| TVyNovelas Awards (Mexico) | 2010 | "Me enamoré de ti" | Best Musical Theme | Nominated | |
| Viña del Mar International Song Festival | 1989 | Chayanne | Antorcha de Plata (Silver Torch) | Silver | |
| Viña del Mar International Song Festival | 1991 | Chayanne | Gaviota de la Paz (Gull of Peace) | Honoree | |
| Viña del Mar International Song Festival | 1991 | Chayanne | Best Show | Won | |
| Viña del Mar International Song Festival | 1998 | Chayanne | Gaviota de Plata (Silver Gull) | Silver | |
| Viña del Mar International Song Festival | 2000 | Chayanne | Gaviota de Plata | Silver | |
| Viña del Mar International Song Festival | 2000 | Chayanne | Gaviota de Plata | Silver | |
| Viña del Mar International Song Festival | 2000 | Chayanne | Most Popular Artist | Won | |
| Viña del Mar International Song Festival | 2002 | Chayanne | Gaviota de Plata | Silver | |
| Viña del Mar International Song Festival | 2002 | Chayanne | Antorcha de Plata | Silver | |
| Viña del Mar International Song Festival | 2002 | Chayanne | Most Popular Artist | Won | |
| Viña del Mar International Song Festival | 2008 | Chayanne | Antorcha de Oro (Gold Torch) | Gold | |
| Viña del Mar International Song Festival | 2008 | Chayanne | Antorcha de Plata | Silver | |
| Viña del Mar International Song Festival | 2008 | Chayanne | Gaviota de Plata | Silver | |
| Viña del Mar International Song Festival | 2008 | Chayanne | Most Popular Artist | Won | |
| Viña del Mar International Song Festival | 2011 | Chayanne | Antorcha de Oro | Gold | |
| Viña del Mar International Song Festival | 2011 | Chayanne | Antorcha de Plata | Silver | |
| Viña del Mar International Song Festival | 2011 | Chayanne | Gaviota de Plata | Silver | |
| Viña del Mar International Song Festival | 2011 | Chayanne | Gaviota de Oro (Gold Gull) | Gold | |
| Viña del Mar International Song Festival | 2015 | Chayanne | Antorcha de Plata | Silver | |
| Viña del Mar International Song Festival | 2015 | Chayanne | Antorcha de Oro | Gold | |
| Viña del Mar International Song Festival | 2015 | Chayanne | Gaviota de Oro | Gold | |
| World Music Awards | 2013 | Chayanne | World's Best Male Singer | Nominated | |
| Your World Awards (Premios Tú Mundo) | 2014 | Chayanne | Favorite Pop Artist | Nominated | |

== Other accolades ==
List of state honors
| Country | Year | Description | Status | Ref. |
|---|---|---|---|---|
| Peru | 1989 | Honorary Tourism Ambassador Award from Peruvian National Chamber of Tourism | Honoree | |
