= Chayanne: Vivo =

Live album by Chayanne
- Released: October 28, 2008
- Recorded: 2007
- Venues: The River Plate Stadium, Buenos Aires, Argentina
- Genre: Latin pop
- Length: 52:50

Chayanne chronology
Mi Tiempo (2007)	Chayanne: Vivo (2008)	De Piel A Piel (2008)

Chayanne: Vivo is the first live album by Puerto Rican singer Chayanne. The earliest songs from this album are from Provócame (1992).

== Track listing ==
1. Y Tú Te Vas
2. Yo Te Amo (Atado a Tu Amor medley)
3. No Te Preocupes Por Mi
4. Caprichosa
5. Tengo Miedo
6. Si Nos Quedara Poco Tiempo
7. Lola
8. Dejaría Todo
9. Un Siglo Sin Ti (Contra Vientos y Mareas medley)
10. Torero
11. Te Echo de Menos
12. Provócame

== DVD version ==
1. Y Tu Te Vas
2. Salome/Boom Boom (Medley)
3. No Se Por Que
4. No Te Preocupe Por Mi
5. Caprichosa
6. Tengo Miedo
7. Si Nos Quedara Poco Tiempo
8. Lola
9. Este Ritmo Se Baila Asi/Baila Baila (Medley)
10. Dejaria Todo
11. Un Siglo Sin Ti/Contra Vientos y Mareas (Medley)
12. Santa Sofia
13. Torero
14. Te Echo de Menos
15. Provocame

== De Piel A Piel ==
De Piel A Piel is the third compilation album released after Chayanne: Vivo. It includes all the same songs from Chayanne: Vivo but not recorded live.

De Piel A Piel

Compilation album by Chayanne
- Released: September 9, 2008
- Recorded: 1987–2008
- Genres: Latin pop, dance
- Label: Sony Music

Chayanne chronology
Chayanne: Vivo (2008)	De Piel A Piel (2008)	No Hay Imposibles (2010)

Singles from De Piel A Piel
- 1. "Amor Inmortal" Released: 2008

== Track listing ==
1. Tu Pirata Soy Yo
2. Este Ritmo Se Baila Así
3. Fiesta En América
4. Completamente Enamorados
5. Provócame
6. El Centro de Mi Corazón
7. Dejaría Todo
8. Candela
9. Yo Te Amo
10. Y Tú Te Vas
11. Torero
12. Un Siglo Sin Ti
13. Salomé
14. Es Tiempo de Jugar
15. Atado a Tu Amor
16. Te Echo de Menos
17. Si Nos Quedara Poco Tiempo
18. Amor Inmortal

== Music videos ==
1. Amor Inmortal
2. Es Tiempo de Jugar
3. Yo Te Amo
4. Atado a Tu Amor
5. Un Siglo Sin Ti

== Charts ==
Chart (2008)	Peak position
Mexican Albums Chart	4
Spanish Albums Chart	36
U.S. Billboard Top Latin Albums	31
U.S. Billboard Latin Pop Albums	5

== Sales and certifications ==
Region	Certification	Certified units/sales
Argentina (CAPIF)	Gold	20,000^{^}
Mexico (AMPROFON)	Platinum+Gold	120,000^{‡}
^{^} Shipments figures based on certification alone.^{‡} Sales+streaming figures based on certification alone.
