= Desde Siempre =

Compilation album by Chayanne
- Released: March 29, 2005
- Recorded: 1988–2005
- Genre: Latin pop
- Label: Sony BMG

Chayanne chronology
Sincero (2003)	Desde Siempre (2005)	Cautivo (2005)

Singles from Desde Siempre
- 1. "Contra Vientos y Mareas" Released: 2005

Desde Siempre (Since Ever) is the second compilation album by Puerto Rican singer Chayanne, which was released on March 29, 2005.

== Album information ==
Unlike of his previous compilation album Grandes Éxitos, this album is a collection of Chayanne ballads with a new song "Contra Vientos y Mareas" by Franco De Vita.

== Track listing ==
The track listing from Billboard.com

No.	Title	Writer(s)	Album	Length
1.	"Contra Vientos y Mareas"	Franco De Vita	Previously unreleased	4:03
2.	"Un Siglo Sin Ti"	Franco De Vita	Sincero	4:40
3.	"Volver a Nacer"	Estéfano, Ximena Zapata	Volver a Nacer	4:53
4.	"Cuidarte el Alma"	Marc Durandeau, Cris Zalles	Sincero	4:13
5.	"Fuiste un Trozo de Hielo en la Escarcha"	José María Cano	Chayanne	4:47
6.	"Atado a Tu Amor"	Estéfano	Atado a Tu Amor	5:02
7.	"El Centro de Mi Corazón"	Alejandro Vezzani	Provócame	3:47
8.	"Pienso En Ti"	Estéfano	Atado a Tu Amor	4:17
9.	"Yo Te Amo"	Estéfano	Simplemente	4:50
10.	"Sólamente Tu Amor"	Donato Poveda, Hal S. Batt	Volver a Nacer	3:24
11.	"Daría Cualquier Cosa"	Julio Seijas, Luis Gómez-Escolar	Tiempo de Vals	3:20
12.	"Entre Mis Recuerdos"	Albert Hammond; H. Knight	Volver a Nacer	3:46

== Music videos ==
1. Contra Vientos y Mareas

== Personnel ==
- Alex Acuña – percussion, drum machine
- Carlos Alvarez – mixing
- Marcelo Anez – engineer
- Tommy Anthony – backing vocals
- Kevin Apple – stylist
- Marcello Azevedo – acoustic guitar, bass, arranger, electric guitar, programming
- Greg Bartheld – programming
- Odisa Beltrán – production assistant
- Manny Benito – vocal producer, vocal coach
- Andres Bermudez – assistant engineer
- Edwin Bonilla – percussion
- Jorge Calandrelli – synthesizer, piano, arranger, producer
- Alberto Carballo – graphic design
- Jessica Chirino – backing vocals
- Michael "Junno" Cosculluela – backing vocals
- David Davidson – violin
- Doug Emery – arranger, drum programming
- Estéfano – producer
- Ronnie Foster – arranger, producer
- Mike Fuller – mastering
- Iker Gastaminza – arranger, engineer, mixing
- Julio Hernandez – bass
- Richard Howell – assistant engineer
- Paul Jackson Jr. – guitar
- Max Kolibe – engineer
- Abraham Laboriel – bass
- Anthony LaMarchina – cello
- Lee Levine – arranger, drums, programming
- Roberto Livi – producer
- John Lucas – backing vocals
- Ricardo Eddy Martinez – arranger, producer
- Chris McDonald – string arrangements
- Miami Symphonic Orchestra – strings
- Raul Midón – backing vocals
- Joel Numa – engineer
- Luis Fernando Ochoa – producer
- Alfredo Oliva – concert master
- Wendy Pedersen – backing vocals
- Lena Pérez – backing vocals
- Donato Póveda – producer
- Julio C. Reyes – conductor, orchestration
- Gustavo Sanchez – producer
- Randy Singer – harmonica
- Cesar Sogbe – engineer, mixing, vocal engineer
- Rafael Solano – percussion
- Rene Toledo – guitar, arranger, producer, vocal coach
- Carlos Cats Valldejuli – production coordination
- Mauricio Velez – photography
- Dan Warner – electric guitar
- James Warner – engineer
- Bruce Weeden – mixing
- Kristin Wilkinson – viola
- Cristian Zalles – backing vocals

== Charts ==
Chart (2005)	Peak position
Billboard European Top 100 Albums	66
U.S. Billboard 200	182
U.S. Billboard Top Latin Albums	8
U.S. Billboard Latin Pop Albums	2

== Sales and certifications ==
Region	Certification	Certified units/sales
Argentina (CAPIF)	Platinum	40,000^{^}
Mexico (AMPROFON)	Gold	50,000^{^}
^{^} Shipments figures based on certification alone.
