= List of number-one Billboard Latin Pop Airplay songs of 2002 =

The most popular Latin pop songs in 2002, ranked by radio airplay audience impressions and measured by Nielsen BDS.

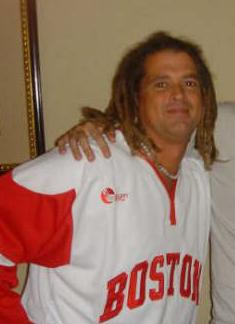
Singer Carlos Vives reached the #1 position with the hit "Déjame Entrar" (Eng: Let me in), this song spent 2 consecutive weeks at the peak position

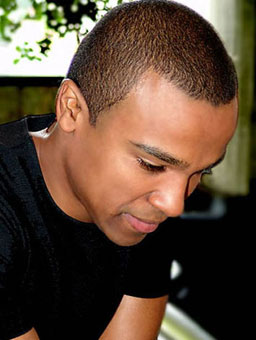
Singer Alexandre Pires earned another hit for his career with the song "Necesidad" (En: Need), reaching the #1 spot for 2 consecutive weeks.

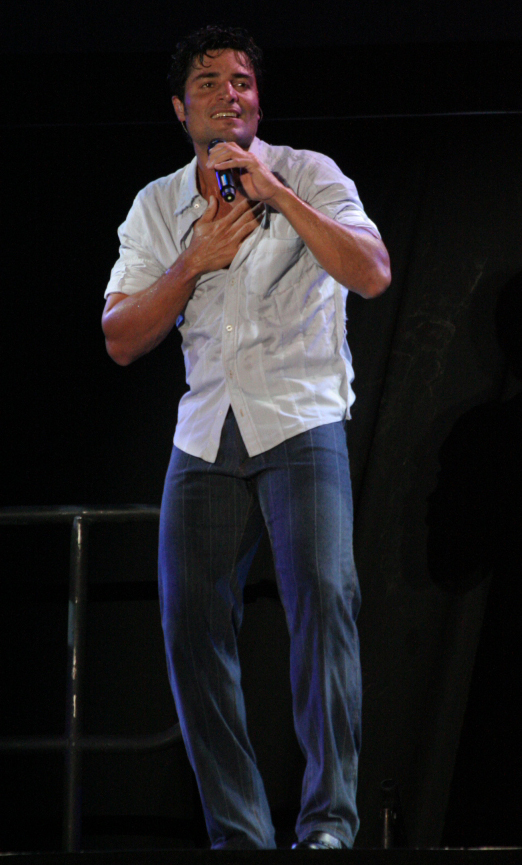
Singer Chayanne earned the #1 spot with the smash hit "Y Tú Te Vas" (Eng: And now you go) which belong to his greatest hit collection album, this song was the longest-running of the year with 18 consecutive weeks.

Issue date	Song	Artist(s)	Ref.
January 5	"Suerte"	Shakira	
January 12	"Déjame Entrar"	Carlos Vives	
January 19	"Déjame Entrar"	Carlos Vives	
January 26	"Como Duele"	Luis Miguel	
February 2	"Como Duele"	Luis Miguel	
February 9	"Como Duele"	Luis Miguel	
February 16	"Como Duele"	Luis Miguel	
February 23	"Como Duele"	Luis Miguel	
March 2	"Como Duele"	Luis Miguel	
March 9	"Como Duele"	Luis Miguel	
March 16	"Como Duele"	Luis Miguel	
March 23	"Necesidad"	Alexandre Pires	
March 30	"Necesidad"	Alexandre Pires	
April 6	"Y Tú Te Vas"	Chayanne	
April 13	"Y Tú Te Vas"	Chayanne	
April 20	"Y Tú Te Vas"	Chayanne	
April 27	"Y Tú Te Vas"	Chayanne	
May 4	"Y Tú Te Vas"	Chayanne	
May 11	"Y Tú Te Vas"	Chayanne	
May 18	"Y Tú Te Vas"	Chayanne	
May 25	"Y Tú Te Vas"	Chayanne	
June 1	"Y Tú Te Vas"	Chayanne	
June 8	"Y Tú Te Vas"	Chayanne	
June 15	"Y Tú Te Vas"	Chayanne	
June 22	"Y Tú Te Vas"	Chayanne	
June 29	"Y Tú Te Vas"	Chayanne	
July 6	"Y Tú Te Vas"	Chayanne	
July 13	"Y Tú Te Vas"	Chayanne	
July 20	"Y Tú Te Vas"	Chayanne	
July 27	"Y Tú Te Vas"	Chayanne	
August 3	"Y Tú Te Vas"	Chayanne	
August 10	"Yo Puedo Hacer"	Ricardo Montaner	
August 17	"Yo Puedo Hacer"	Ricardo Montaner	
August 24	"A Dios le Pido"	Juanes	
August 31	"Mentiroso"	Enrique Iglesias	
September 7	"Mentiroso"	Enrique Iglesias	
September 14	"Mentiroso"	Enrique Iglesias	
September 21	"Mentiroso"	Enrique Iglesias	
September 28	"Mentiroso"	Enrique Iglesias	
October 5	"Mentiroso"	Enrique Iglesias	
October 12	"Mentiroso"	Enrique Iglesias	
October 19	"Mentiroso"	Enrique Iglesias	
October 26	"Aserejé"	Las Ketchup	
November 2	"Aserejé"	Las Ketchup	
November 9	"Aserejé"	Las Ketchup	
November 16	"Cuando me Miras Así"	Cristian Castro	
November 23	"Cuando me Miras Así"	Cristian Castro	
November 30	"El Problema"	Ricardo Arjona	
December 7	"El Problema"	Ricardo Arjona	
December 14	"El Problema"	Ricardo Arjona	
December 21	"El Problema"	Ricardo Arjona	
December 28	"El Problema"	Ricardo Arjona	
