= Torero (disambiguation) =

A torero is the central bullfighter who must kill the bull.

Torero may also refer to:

== In arts and literature ==
- Torero! (film), a 1956 Mexican documentary film by Carlos Velo
- "Torero" (song), by Chayanne

== Other ==
- Torero Stadium, a 6,000-seat stadium in San Diego, California.
