= Fuiste un Trozo de Hielo en la Escarcha =

Single by Chayanne

from the album Chayanne II
- Released: 1989
- Recorded: 1988
- Genre: Latin pop · Latin ballad
- Length: 4:45
- Label: Discos CBS International
- Songwriter: José María Cano
- Producer: Ronnie Foster

Chayanne singles chronology
"Este Ritmo Se Baila Así" (1989)	"Fuiste un Trozo de Hielo en la Escarcha" (1989)	"Fantasías" (1989)

"Fuiste un Trozo de Hielo en la Escarcha" (English: You Were a Piece of Ice in the Frost) is a ballad originally written by José María Cano for the female singer Amaya Uranga's (former Mocedades member) debut solo studio album Volver, released in 1986.

It was later covered by Puerto Rican singer Chayanne with production by Ronnie Foster. It was released as the third single from the Grammy nominated studio album Chayanne II (1988) and became the first number-one single for the singer in the Billboard Hot Latin Tracks chart in late 1989 and the first number-one single by a Puerto Rican musician.

== Song history ==
Chayanne "Fuiste un Trozo de Hielo en la Escarcha" (1988)
27 second sample from Chayanne's ballad "Fuiste un Hielo en la Escharcha".

The lyrics for "Fuiste un Trozo de Hielo en la Escarcha" deal with the end of a romantic relationship, and the singer tells the story of a girl who leaves him with a cruel farewell to her departure. As the song progresses he acknowledges the good things about the relationship and his surprise that it is finished. The author of the song, J. M. Cano, member of the successful Spanish trio Mecano, also wrote "Tiempo de Vals", the title song of Chayanne's following album (1990). Regarding the composition and message of the song, the singer said: "When the song is about something I have not lived, I try to do it like a movie. And I try to get into character, and suffer and feel the song, I can relate to some, but for others I like to get be inside other lives. And I try to interpret it. That's where you try to live it or feel it. And that is where my interpretation is." A portuguese version titled "Miragem", was recorded by the singer for the Brazilian edition of the album. The song was covered in 2004 by Puerto Rican salsa orchestra N'Klabe, and included it on their album Salsa Contra Viento y Marea.

== Chart performance ==
The song debuted in the Billboard Hot Latin Tracks chart at number 16 in the week of October 7, 1989, climbing to the top ten the following week. "Fuiste un Trozo de Hielo en la Escarcha" peaked at number-one on November 4, 1989, on its fifth week, holding this position for one week, replacing "Fría Como el Viento" by Luis Miguel. One week later the song reached the top spot again, being succeeded three weeks later by Los Bukis with "Cómo Fuí a Enamorarme de Tí".

== Music video ==
A music video, directed by Chayanne's then manager Guatavo Sánchez, was filmed featuring the singer performing the song on a black background, surrounded by statue-shaped ice blocks. It was included on Chayanne's DVD Grandes Éxitos.

== See also ==
- List of number-one Billboard Top Latin Songs from the 1980s
