= Grandes Éxitos (Chayanne album) =

Greatest hits album by Chayanne
- Released: March 19, 2002
- Recorded: 1987–2002
- Genre: Latin pop; dance-pop; latin ballad
- Length: 61:14
- Label: Sony Discos

Chayanne chronology
Simplemente (2000)	Grandes Éxitos (2002)	Sincero (2003)

Singles from Grandes éxitos
- 1. "Y Tú Te Vas" Released: January 21, 2002; 2. "Torero" Released: February 11, 2002; 3. "Quisiera Ser" Released: July 1, 2002

Grandes Éxitos is the first greatest hits album recorded by Puerto Rican-American recording artist Chayanne. This album was released by Sony Discos on March 19, 2002 (see 2002 in music). In this album Chayanne featured three new songs, "Y Tú Te Vas", Torero, and "Quisiera Ser" (as well as remixes of the songs "Salomé" and "Baila Baila", and a re-recorded version of "Fiesta En América"). The album peaked at #1 on Billboard's Hot Latin Albums, becoming his first album to reach #1 in that category, and #199 on the Billboard 200. A video, also titled Grandes éxitos was released in VHS and DVD featuring 13 videos of the singer.

== Track listing ==
No.	Title	Writer(s)	Originally released on	Length
1.	"Y Tú Te Vas"	Franco De Vita	Previously unreleased	4:44
2.	"Torero"	Estéfano · Marcello Azevedo	Previously unreleased	3:36
3.	"Quisiera Ser"	Daniel Freiberg · Donato Póveda	Previously unreleased	4:25
4.	"Salomé" (Club Mix Radio Edit)	Estéfano	Atado a Tu Amor (1998)	4:22
5.	"Completamente Enamorados"	Piero Cassano · Adelio Cogliati · Eros Ramazzotti; Lyrics: Spanish: Luis Gómez-Escolar	Tiempo de Vals (1990)	4:20
6.	"Fiesta en América" (Extended Rock Re-Recording)	Honorio Herrero	Chayanne '87 (1987)	6:22
7.	"Tú Pirata Soy Yo"	Honorio Herrero	Chayanne II (1988)	2:53
8.	"Este Ritmo Se Baila Así" (Sye Bwa)	Jacob Desvarieux · Pierre-Édouard Décimus; Lyrics: Spanish: Roberto Livi	Chayanne II (1988)	4:28
9.	"Tiempo de Vals"	José María Cano	Tiempo de Vals (1990)	4:09
10.	"Provócame"	John Van Katwik · Marcel Schimscheimer; Lyrics: Spanish: Honorio Herrero · Gustavo Sánchez	Provócame (1992)	4:10
11.	"Dejaría Todo"	Estéfano	Atado a Tu Amor (1998)	4:44
12.	"Baila, Baila" (Meme's Boricua Radio Edit)	Donato Póveda · Hal S. Batt	Volver a Nacer (1996)	4:22
13.	"Tal Vez es Amor" (Talvez Seja Amor)	Augusto César · Paulo Sérgio Valle; Lyrics: Spanish: Luis Gómez-Escolar	Volver a Nacer (1996)	4:37
14.	"Candela"	Erika Ender · Donato Póveda	Simplemente (2000)	3:58

DVD
No.	Title	Writer(s)	Video Director	Length
1.	"Y Tú Te Vas"	Franco De Vita	Pablo Croce · Simón Brand	4:37
2.	"Torero"	Estéfano · Marcello Azevedo	Pablo Croce · Simón Brand	3:48
3.	"Salomé"	Estéfano	Simón Brand	4:25
4.	"Yo Te Amo"	Estéfano	Simón Brand	4:52
5.	"Fiesta En América"	Honorio Herrero	Gustavo Sánchez	4:13
6.	"Baila, Baila (Meme's Boricua Radio Edit)"	Donato Póveda · Hal S. Batt	Simón Brand	3:44
7.	"Completamente Enamorados"	Piero Cassano · Adelio Cogliati · Eros Ramazzotti; Lyrics: Spanish: Luis Gómez-Escolar	Abraham Pulido	4:20
8.	"Tiempo de Vals"	José María Cano	Gustavo Sánchez	4:57
9.	"Dejaría Todo"	Estéfano	Juan Marrero	4:32
10.	"Volver a Nacer"	Estéfano · Ximena Zapata	Juan Marrero	4:01
11.	"Atado a Tu Amor"	Estéfano	Douglas Friedman	4:36
12.	"Boom, Boom"	Antonio Montoya · Poncho Abaldonato · Raphael Abaldonato · Antonie Santiago · Fevrier Fernández; Lyrics: Spanish: Estéfano	Cristophe	4:00
13.	"Fuiste un Trozo de Hielo en la Escarcha"	José María Cano	Gustavo Sánchez	4:37

== Charts ==
Chart (2002)	Peak position
Argentine Albums (CAPIF)	5
European Albums (Music & Media)	37
Portuguese Albums Chart (IFPI)	6
Spain Albums (PROMUSICAE)	1
Switzerland (Swiss Hitparade)	71
U.S. Billboard 200	199
U.S. Billboard Top Latin Albums	1
U.S. Billboard Latin Pop Albums	1
U.S. Billboard Heatseekers Albums	9

=== Year-end charts ===
Chart (2002)	Peak position
Spanish Albums (AFYVE)	13
Spanish Foreign Albums (AFYVE)	1
US Billboard Latin Albums	4
US Billboard Latin Pop Albums	4

=== Decade-end charts ===
2000s decade-end chart performance for "Grandes Éxitos"
Chart (2000–2009)	Position
US Latin Albums (Billboard)	63

== Sales and certifications ==
Region	Certification	Certified units/sales
Argentina (CAPIF)	2× Platinum	80,000^{^}
Mexico (AMPROFON)	Platinum	150,000^{^}
Spain (Promusicae)	3× Platinum	300,000^{^}
United States (RIAA)	2× Platinum (Latin)	200,000^{^}
^{^} Shipments figures based on certification alone.
