= Fiesta En América =

1987 single by Chayanne

"Fiesta En America"

Single by Chayanne

from the album Chayanne
- Released: 1987
- Recorded: 1987
- Genre: Tropical music; Salsa
- Length: 3:44
- Label: CBS Columbia
- Songwriter: Honorio Herrero
- Producers: Ronnie Foster, Oscar Gómez

Chayanne singles chronology
"Una Foto Para Dos" (1986)	"Fiesta En America" (1987)	"Violeta" (1987)

"Fiesta En America" (English: "Party in the Americas") is a song written by Honorio Herrero and performed by Puerto Rican singer Chayanne. A portuguese version titled "Canta America" was recorded by the singer for the Brazilian edition for the album. It was released as his first single from his third album Chayanne. The song was re-recorded as a rock version. The version last to 6 minutes. It was included in Grandes Éxitos.

== Music video ==
A music video, directed by the singer's then manager Gustavo Sanchez, was filmed featuring Chayanne dancing with other people around the streets in the Old San Juan. It was included in Grandes Éxitos DVD.

== Remixes ==
1. "Fiesta en America (Version 12)" – 5:40

== Chart performance ==
The single was peaked at number 4 in the Billboard Hot Latin Tracks chart on October 10, 1987. It also ranked 49th in the 2008 recap for the '100 Greatest Songs of the 80's in Spanish' by VH1 Latin America.

Chart (1987)	Peak position
US Hot Latin Songs (Billboard)	4

== Certifications ==
Region	Certification	Certified units/sales
Mexico (AMPROFON)	Platinum	60,000^{‡}
^{‡} Sales+streaming figures based on certification alone.
