= Mi tiempo =

Mi Tiempo

Studio album by Chayanne
- Released: April 10, 2007
- Recorded: 2006–2007
- Studio: Midnight Blue Studios (Miami, FL); The Pass Studios (Los Angeles, CA); Futura Productions Studios; Windigo Music (Boston, MA)
- Genre: Latin pop; dance-pop; soft rock; latin ballad
- Length: 43:17
- Label: Sony BMG Norte
- Producer: Sebastián de Peyrecave; José Gentile

Chayanne chronology
Cautivo (2005)	Mi Tiempo (2007)	Chayanne: Vivo (2008)

Singles from Mi Tiempo
- 1. "Si Nos Quedara Poco Tiempo" Released: February 12, 2007; 2. "Indispensable" Released: June 4, 2007; 3. "Tengo Miedo" Released: July 30, 2007; 4. "Lola" Released: October 8, 2007; 5. "Te Amaré" Released: January 7, 2008

Mi Tiempo (English: My Time) is the 13th studio album recorded by Puerto Rican-American recording artist Chayanne. This album was released by Sony BMG Norte on April 10, 2007 (see 2007 in music). The album was produced by Sebastián de Peyrecave and José Gentile. Six singles were released to promote the album: "Si Nos Quedara Poco Tiempo", "Tengo Miedo", "Indispensable", "Lola", "Te Amaré", and "Bailarina".

It debuted and peaked at position #42 on the U.S. Billboard 200.

== Track listing ==
No.	Title	Writer(s)	Length
1.	"Si Nos Quedara Poco Tiempo"	Yoel Henríquez · Rafael Esparza-Ruíz	3:19
2.	"Lola"	Estéfano · Sebastián de Peyrecave · Pedro Namerow	4:14
3.	"Cuestion de Feeling"	Estéfano · Sebastián de Peyrecave · Pedro Namerow	4:19
4.	"Tengo Miedo"	Estéfano · Sebastián de Peyrecave · Pedro Namerow	4:06
5.	"Indispensable"	Érika Ender · Donato Póveda	4:03
6.	"Bailarina"	Estéfano · Jimmy Rey	4:23
7.	"Te Amaré"	Estéfano · Sebastián de Peyrecave	3:55
8.	"Sin Palabras de Relleno"	Antonio Rayo "Rayito" · José Miguel Velásquez	3:35
9.	"Me Voy a Río"	Estéfano	3:50
10.	"Loco por Vos"	Estéfano	3:18
11.	"Juicio Final"	Estéfano · José Gentile · Sebastián de Peyrecave	4:14

== Music videos ==
1. Si Nos Quedara Poco Tiempo

== Credits and personnel ==
- Chayanne – Vocals
- Sebastián de Peyrecave – Acoustic and electric guitar, Percussion, Arranger, Drums, Hammond organ, Programming, Producer, Engineer, Mixing
- José Gentile – Synthesizer, Acoustic and electric guitar, Piano, Arranger, Keyboards, Programming, Producer, Engineer, Slide Guitar, String Arrangements, Mixing, Cello Arrangement, Background Vocals
- Pedro Namerow – Arranger, Keyboards, Programming, Melodica, Engineer, Assistant Engineer
- Estéfano – Background Vocals
- Prince Patrick – Vocals
- José Tomás Díaz – Vocals, Percussion
- Leo Quntero – Acoustic guitar, Cuatro
- Andrew Synowiec – Electric guitar, Slide Guitar, E-Bow
- Fernando Huergo – Bass
- Víctor Indrizzo – Drums
- Richard Bravo – Percussion
- Jimmy Rey – Arranger, Programming
- Teddy Mulet – Trombone, Brass, Brass Arrangement
- Wells Cunningham – Cello
- Natalia Betancurt – Background Vocals
- Yisel Duque – Background Vocals
- Dennis Reyes – Background Vocals
- Janet Dacal – Background Vocals
- Mónica Sierra – Background Vocals
- Rob Jaczko – Engineer
- Dave Way – Engineer
- John Weston – Engineer
- Miguel Pessoa – Engineer
- Zeph Sowers – Assistant Engineer
- David Stearns – Assistant Engineer
- Jack Young – Assistant Engineer
- Vlado Meller – Mastering
- Odisa Beltran – Production Coordination
- Claudia Salgado – Production Coordination
- Andrew List – Conductor
- 1st Violin – Gregory Vitale, Paula Oaks, Kristina Nilsson, Christine Vitale, Pattison Story, Gerals Mordis
- 2nd Violin – Maynard Goldman, Robert Curtis, Melissa Howe, Olga Kusnetzova, Susan Faux, Sonja Larson
- Viola – Jean Haig, Abigail Kubert-Cross, Susan Curran-Culpo, Lisa Suslowicz, Stephen Dyball
- Cello – Ronal Lowry, Melany Dyball, Marc Moskovitz, Alexandre Lecarme
- Double Bass – Robert Lynam, Barry Boettger, Irving Steinberg

© MMVII. Sony Music Entertainment US Latin LLC

== Charts ==
=== Weekly charts ===
Chart (2007)	Peak position
Billboard European Top 100 Albums	86
Mexican Albums Chart	6
Spanish Albums Chart	6
U.S. Billboard 200	42
U.S. Billboard Top Latin Albums	2
U.S. Billboard Latin Pop Albums	2

=== Year-end charts ===
Chart (2007)	Peak position
Argentine Albums (CAPIF)	9

== Sales and certifications ==
Region	Certification	Certified units/sales
Argentina (CAPIF)	Platinum	40,000^{^}
Chile	Platinum	
Mexico (AMPROFON)	Gold	50,000^{^}
Mexico (AMPROFON) Deluxe edition	Gold	50,000^{‡}
Spain (PROMUSICAE)	Gold	40,000^{^}
United States (RIAA)	Platinum (Latin)	100,000^{^}
^{^} Shipments figures based on certification alone.^{‡} Sales+streaming figures based on certification alone.
