= Sangre Latina =

Studio album by Chayanne
- Released: 1986
- Recorded: 1985–1986
- Genre: Latin pop, pop rock, new wave
- Length: 33:33
- Label: RCA Ariola
- Producer: José Antonio Álvarez Alija

Chayanne chronology
Chayanne es mi Nombre (1984)	Sangre Latina (1986)	Chayanne (1987)

Singles from Sangre Latina
- 1. "Vuelve" Released: 1986; 2. "Una Foto Para Dos" Released: 1986; 3. "Jana" Released: 1987

Professional ratings
Review scores
Source	Rating
AllMusic	4/5 stars

Sangre Latina (English: "Latin Blood") is the second studio album by Puerto Rican performer Chayanne. It was released by RCA Ariola in 1986, his last album by record label. The album was produced again by José Antonio Álvarez Alija.

== Track listing ==
No.	Title	Writer(s)	Length
1.	"Vuelve"	Honorio Herrero, Luis G. Escolar	4:10
2.	"Amo una Estrella"	Luis G. Escolar	2:40
3.	"Sangre Latina"	Honorio Herrero	3:05
4.	"¿Qué Será?"	Honorio Herrero	3:28
5.	"Brujería"	Jorge Guiro Borrego	3:02
6.	"Única"	Honorio Herrero, Luis G. Escolar	3:59
7.	"Una Foto para Dos"	Honorio Herrero, Luis G. Escolar	3:03
8.	"Jana"	Honorio Herrero	2:36
9.	"Voy"	Honorio Herrero	2:53
10.	"Latin Lover"	Honorio Herrero	3:43

== Music videos ==
1. "Vuelve"
2. "Una Foto Para Dos"
3. "Jana"
