= Dejaría Todo =

- Mexican CD single cover

Single by Chayanne

from the album Atado a Tu Amor
- Released: September 1998
- Genre: Rock
- Length: 4:43
- Label: Sony Discos
- Songwriter: Estéfano
- Producer: Estéfano

Chayanne singles chronology
"You Are My Home" / "Refugio de Amor" (1998)	"Dejaría Todo" (1998)	"Salomé" (1999)

Music video
- "Dejaría Todo" on YouTube

"Dejaría Todo" (transl. "I'd Leave Everything") is a song by Puerto Rican singer Chayanne from his ninth studio album, Atado a Tu Amor (1998). The song was written and produced by Estéfano and released as the lead single from the album in September 1998 by Sony Discos.The rock ballad details everything the singer is capable of doing for his lover. The song received generally positive reactions from music critics and is listed among Chayanne's best songs. A music video for the song was filmed and features a dark scenery. Commercially, it topped the Billboard Hot Latin Songs and Latin Pop Airplay charts in the United States. The track was nominated for Pop Song of the Year at the 11th Lo Nuestro Awards and Song of the Year at the inaugural Ritmo Latino Music Awards in 1999 and was acknowledged as an award-winning song at the 2000 Broadcast Music, Inc. (BMI) Latin Awards.

"Dejaría Todo" has been covered by Brazilian singer Leonardo, Puerto Rican singer Johnny Ray, and Latin American boy band CNCO. Leonardo recorded the Portuguese version, "Deixaria Tudo", which reached number two in Brazil, while Johnny Ray's cover peaked at number 15 on the Tropical Airplay in the US. CNCO's rendition was included on their covers album, Déjà Vu (2021). It peaked at number four on the Monitor Latino Peruvian pop charts.

== Background and composition ==
On February 6, 1998, Chayanne announced during the 39th Viña del Mar International Song Festival in Chile that he was set to start recording a new album in June. Further details about the album were revealed during a press conference in August at the Plaza Hotel in New York City including its name, Atado a Tu Amor, and release date on September 29, 1998. Chayanne described the record as "in the same style that I have been maintaining all my career. It's pop music, with a Caribbean influence, and the romantic ballads. It's for couples. It's for love." Recorded in Puerto Rico and Los Angeles, it features compositions written by musicians that Chayanne had collaborated before including Estéfano of Donato & Estéfano. One of the four songs Estéfano wrote for Atado a Tu Amor was "Dejaría Todo", which also he produced.

"Dejaría Todo" is a rock romantic ballad, that, lyrically, addresses everything the singer is capable of doing for his loved one. In the lyrics, he sings: "Lo dejaría todo porque te quedaras, mi credo, mi familia, mi religion" ("I'd leave everything behind so that you'll stay, my family, my religion"). Chayanne regarded the track as one of his favorites in 2016, stating: "Dejaría Todo was a marvelous record. I already had experience, I'd done several kinds of tours, I was established, I had mass recognition, enthusiasm, and it all came together with "Dejaría Todo"." In 2021, the artist revealed the song was inspired by a past relationship he had with a former lover. A Portuguese-language version of the song, "Deixaria Tudo" was also recorded for the Brazilian market with the lyrics being adapted by Lucas Robles.

== Promotion and reception ==
"Dejaría Todo" was released as the lead single for Atado a Tu Amor on the first week of September 1998 by Sony Discos. The original recording was also featured on his greatest hits album Grandes Éxitos (2002). A live version of the track was included on the albums Vivo (2008) and A Solas Con Chayanne (2012). A live version of the track was included on the albums Vivo (2008) and A Solas Con Chayanne (2012), A music video for the track was filmed. A writer for Los 40 described it as a "claustrophobic scenario that speaks about the sadness of love in this video created by narrow corridors, dark colors, large pillars in which the singer gets and even a cage in which a model appears".

El Norte critic Deborah Davis cited it as one of the tracks that makes the album "a successful resurrection". Joey Guerra of the Houston Chronicle called it a "pleasant enough ballad with some nice acoustic guitar work". El Nuevo Diario critic Edgard Barberna S. praised it as a "impressive ballad that gets under skin as a prayer of love". Eliseo Cardona, who wrote a more critical review of Atado a Tu Amor for El Nuevo Herald, felt that "Dejaría Todo", along with the title track, "stand out in a banal repertoire made for the staging of the live show." A writer for Clarín listed it as one of the singer's "15 Greatest Hits", while an editor from El Debate cited the track as of the five songs that made him famous.

Commercially, it reached number one on the Billboard Hot Latin Songs and Latin Pop Airplay charts in the United States. "Dejaría Todo" was Chayanne's first number single on the Hot Latin Songs chart in over six years since "El Centro de Mi Corazón" in 1992 and was the best-performing Latin pop song of the year in the US. At the 11th Annual Lo Nuestro Awards in 1999, the song was nominated in the category of Pop Song of the Year, which was awarded to Ricky Martin's "La Copa de la Vida". In the same year, at the inaugural Ritmo Latino Music Awards, the track was nominated Song of the Year, but lost to "Esperanza" (1998) by Enrique Iglesias. It was acknowledged as an award-winning song at the 2000 BMI Latin Awards.

== Cover versions ==
The Portuguese version, "Deixaria Tudo", was covered by Brazilian singer Leonardo on his studio album, Quero Colo (2000), and reached number two in Brazil according to Billboard. Leonardo performed it live as part of a medley with his son and musician Zé Felipe in 2013 which was recorded for the live album 30 Anos (2014). Puerto Rican musician Johnny Ray recorded a salsa rendition of the track on his studio album, Romántico con Salsa (2001). It peaked at number 15 on the Tropical Airplay chart in the US.

Latin American boy band CNCO included the song on their covers album Déjà Vu (2021). Cristina Jaleru of the Associated Press complimented CNCO's take as a "livelier sound" in comparison to the original recording. CNCO's version peaked at number four on the Peruvian pop charts according to Monitor Latino. The band sung "Dejaria Todo" live at the Premio Lo Nuestro 2021 along with several other songs from the album.

== Formats and track listings ==
Brazilian promotional single

1. Deixaria Tudo – 4:44
2. Deixaria Tudo (Samba Pra Ti) – 5:08
3. Deixaria Tudo (Samba Pra Festa) – 6:25
4. Deixaria Tudo (Samba Pra Festa) (edit) – 5:06
5. Dejaría Todo – 4:43

European promotional single

1. "Dejaría Todo" – 4:43

Mexican promotional single

1. Dejaría Todo (remix) – 5:19
2. Dejaría Todo – 4:43

== Charts ==
=== Weekly charts ===
Weekly chart positions for "Dejaría Todo"
Chart (1998)	Peak position
Costa Rica (Notimex)	1
El Salvador (Notimex)	1
Nicaragua (Notimex)	2
Panama (Notimex)	3
US Hot Latin Songs (Billboard)	1
US Latin Pop Airplay (Billboard)	1

Weekly chart positions for Leonardo's cover
Chart (2000)	Peak position
Brazil (Billboard)	2

Weekly chart positions for Johnny Ray's cover
Chart (2001)	Peak position
US Tropical Airplay (Billboard)	15

Weekly chart positions for CNCO's cover
Chart (2021)	Peak position
Peru Pop (Monitor Latino)	14

=== Year-end charts ===
1999 year-end chart performance for "Dejaría Todo"
Chart (1999)	Position
US Hot Latin Songs (Billboard)	8
US Latin Pop Airplay (Billboard)	1

== Certifications ==
Region	Certification	Certified units/sales
Mexico (AMPROFON)	Diamond+4× Platinum	540,000^{‡}
^{‡} Sales+streaming figures based on certification alone.

== See also ==
- Billboard Hot Latin Songs Year-End Chart
- List of number-one Billboard Hot Latin Tracks of 1998
- List of Billboard Latin Pop Airplay number ones of 1998
- List of number-one Billboard Hot Latin Tracks of 1999
- List of Billboard Latin Pop Airplay number ones of 1999
