= Es mi nombre =

1984 debut studio album by Chayanne

Chayanne es mi Nombre

Studio album by Chayanne
- Released: April 26, 1984
- Recorded: 1983–1984
- Studio: Kirios Studios (Madrid, Spain); Estudos RCA (Mexico City, Mexico)
- Genre: Latin pop; pop rock; new wave
- Length: 34:32
- Language: Spanish
- Label: RCA Ariola
- Producer: José Antonio Álvarez Alija

Chayanne chronology
| Chayanne es mi Nombre (1984) | Sangre Latina (1986) |

Singles from Chayanne es mi Nombre
- 1. "Chayanne es mi Nombre" Released: 1984; 2. "...¿Y Qué Culpa Tengo Yo?" Released: 1984; 3. "De Dos en Dos" Released: 1985; 4. "Chicos Malos" Released: 1985

Professional ratings
Review scores
| Source | Rating |
|---|---|
| AllMusic | 3/5 stars |

Chayanne es mi Nombre (Chayanne is my Name) is the debut solo studio album recorded by Puerto Rican-American recording artist Chayanne, after he left Los Chicos. The album witch released by RCA Ariola in 1984. The album was produced by José Antonio Álvarez Alija.

== Track listing ==
| No. | Title | Writer(s) | Producer(s) | Length |
|---|---|---|---|---|
| 1. | "Chayanne es mi Nombre" | Honorio Herrero | Honorio Herrero, José A. Quintana | 2:28 |
| 2. | "De Dos en Dos" | Honorio Herrero | Honorio Herrero, José A. Quintana | 2:43 |
| 3. | "Chinatown" | Luis G. Escolar | José Miguel Estebanez | 2:59 |
| 4. | "Sexy" | Honorio Herrero | Honorio Herrero, José A. Quintana | 2:32 |
| 5. | "Un Juego Nuevo" | R. Morales, M.C. CA. Alburquer | José Miguel Estebanez | 3:18 |
| 6. | "Loco" | Honorio Herrero | Jesús Glück | 3:06 |
| 7. | "Chicos Malos" | R. Morales, M.C. GA. Alburquer | José Miguel Estebanez | 3:34 |
| 8. | "Una Marciana en la Avenida" | Luis G. Escolar | José Miguel Estebanez | 3:03 |
| 9. | "Dime Dónde Voy" | Honorio Herrero | Honorio Herrero, José A. Quintana | 3:21 |
| 10. | "Estar a Tu Lado" | Alberto Parra, M. C. GA. Alburquer | José Miguel Estebanez | 3:39 |
| 11. | "....¿Y Qué Culpa Tengo Yo?" | D. Vaona, Honorio Herrero | Jesús Glück | 3:31 |
| Total length: | | | | 34:32 |

== Music videos ==
1. "Chayanne Es Mi Nombre"
2. "...¿Y Qué Culpa Tengo Yo?"
