= Influencias =

Studio album of covers by Chayanne
- Released: September 27, 1994
- Genre: Latin pop
- Length: 46:10
- Label: Sony
- Producer: Ricardo Eddy Martinez

Chayanne chronology
Provócame (1992)	Influencias (1994)	Volver a Nacer (1996)

Singles from Influencias
- 1. "Querida" Released: 1994; 2. "Gavilán o Paloma" Released: 1994; 3. "Pedro Navaja" Released: 1995

Influencias (English: Influences) is an album by Puerto Rican singer Chayanne released in 1994. The album is a tribute to several artists which have influenced Chayanne throughout his life.

== Track listing ==
1. "La Vida Sigue Igual" (Original by Julio Iglesias)
2. "Amada Amante" (Original by Roberto Carlos)
3. "Una Muchacha y una Guitarra" (Original by Sandro)
4. "Yo Soy Aquél" (Original by Raphael)
5. "Pavo Real - Agárrense de las Manos" (Original by José Luis Rodríguez "El Puma")
6. "Gavilán o Paloma" (Original by José José)
7. "Querida" (Original by Juan Gabriel)
8. "Amor Libre" (Original by Camilo Sesto)
9. "Paso la Vida Pensando" (Original by José Feliciano)
10. "Pedro Navaja" (Original by Willie Colón and Rubén Blades)

== Charts ==
Chart (1994)	Peak position
Puerto Rican Albums (UPI)	9
US Top Latin Albums (Billboard)	26
US Latin Pop Albums (Billboard)	12

Year	Chart	Single	Peak position
1994	Billboard Hot Latin Tracks	Querida	24
1994	Billboard Latin Pop Airplay	Querida	9
1995	Billboard Hot Latin Tracks	Gavilán o Paloma	24
1995	Billboard Latin Pop Airplay	Gavilán o Paloma	6

== Certifications ==
Region	Certification	Certified units/sales
Mexico (AMPROFON)	Gold	100,000^{‡}
^{‡} Sales+streaming figures based on certification alone.
