= Torero (song) =

Single by Chayanne

from the album Grandes Éxitos
- Released: January 21, 2002
- Recorded: 2002
- Genre: Latin pop
- Length: 3:36
- Label: Sony Discos
- Songwriters: Estéfano; Marcello Azevedo

Chayanne singles chronology
"Y Tu Te Vas" (2002)	"Torero" (2002)	"Un Siglo Sin Ti" (2003)

Audio sample
- "Torero": file; help

Music video
- "Torero" on YouTube

"Torero" (Bullfighter) is a Latin pop/dance song written by Estéfano and Marcello Azevedo and performed by Puerto Rican singer Chayanne. It was released as the first single from the singer's greatest hits album Grandes Éxitos. The song became a success in Spain where it peaked at number-one. It also became a huge success in all of Latin American and the USA Latin and dance charts. It peaked number one in all of the Spanish-speaking countries.

== Music video ==
A music video, directed by Pablo Croce and produced by María Inés Vélez was shot on February 28, 2002 in Buenos Aires, Argentina. The video was nominated for Latin Grammy Award for Best Short Form Music Video losing to Frijolero by Motolov.

== Controversy ==
Recently, and through a statement, the non-governmental organization called People for the Ethical Treatment of Animals, expressly asked him to change the lyrics, since it could be interpreted as an exaltation of bullfighting, and all of this is in defense of the bulls, in addition, This occurs a few days before the continuation of the musical tour called Bailemos Otra Vez Tour, which began on August 21, 2024 in the city of San José, will continue in Bilbao next Friday, May 16 of this year, and is scheduled to end on October 25, 2025 in Guadalajara.

Furthermore, incidentally, Mimi Bekhechi, vice president of PETA Europe, pointed out that glorifying men who torment and kill animals for entertainment is simply not in line with modern values.

As a new musical alternative, said Non-governmental organization proposed renaming the song Firefighter, arguing that they represent values like courage, empathy, and sacrifice. According to these people, "An artist with your influence has the power to positively impact culture," they said, adding that such a change would send a powerful message of compassion.

== Chart performance ==
=== Weekly charts ===
Chart (2002)	Peak position
Romania (Romanian Top 100)	27
Spain (AFYVE)	1
Sweden (Sverigetopplistan)	9
US Latin Pop Airplay (Billboard)	36

=== Year-end charts ===
Chart (2002)	Rank
Spain (AFYVE)	2

== Certifications ==
Region	Certification	Certified units/sales
Mexico (AMPROFON)	3× Platinum	180,000^{‡}
Spain (Promusicae)	Platinum	60,000^{‡}
^{‡} Sales+streaming figures based on certification alone.
