= Bailemos Otra Vez =

Studio album by Chayanne
- Released: October 27, 2023
- Recorded: 2022–2023
- Length: 24:22
- Language: Spanish
- Label: Sony Music Latin
- Producer: Luis Salazar; Slow Mike; Andrés Torres; Mauricio Rengifo; Andy Clay; Motiff

Chayanne chronology
En Todo Estaré (2014)	Bailemos Otra Vez (2023)

Singles from Bailemos Otra Vez
- 1. "Te Amo y Punto" Released: June 25, 2022; 2. "Como Tú y Yo" Released: September 30, 2022; 3. "Bailando Bachata" Released: May 26, 2023; 4. "Necesito Un Segundo" Released: October 27, 2023

Bailemos Otra Vez (transl. "Let's Dance Again") is the 15th studio album by Puerto Rican singer Chayanne. It was released on October 27, 2023, through Sony Music Latin. Furthermore, it was released almost 10 years after his previous album En Todo Estaré.

== Background and release ==
After 9 years without releasing new material, as of 2015, Chayanne continued to release some singles such as "Culpable Soy Yo", "Qué Me Has Hecho" featuring Wisin, "Choka Choka" featuring Ozuna, "Di Qué Sientes Tú", among others. Later, Chayanne also stopped releasing songs. Eventually, four years later, on June 21, 2022, he returned to social networks announcing the premiere of "Te Amo y Punto", scheduled to be released on June 25. Afterwards, he continued releasing the other singles, "Como Tú y Yo" and "Bailando Bachata", these three singles were a preview of the singer's new album.

At the beginning of October 2023, Chayanne surprisingly confirmed and announced his album, revealing it was titled Bailemos Otra Vez, and confirming its release date, October 27, 2023. A fourth single, "Necesito Un Segundo", was released on the same day as the album.

== Track list ==
Bailemos Otra Vez track listing
No.	Title	Writer(s)	Producer(s)	Length
1.	"Bailemos Otra Vez"	Elmer Figueroa; Miguel Martínez; Rafael Pabón; Florentino Primera	Luis Salazar; Slow Mike	2:33
2.	"La Clave"	Figueroa; Andrés Torres; Mauricio Rengifo; Carlos Peralta; Andy Bauza	Torres; Rengifo	2:18
3.	"Bailando Bachata"	Figueroa; Andy Clay; Yasmil Marrufo; Mario Cáceres	Clay; Salazar	2:51
4.	"De Tanto"	Figueroa; Ricardo López; Juan Morelli; Pablo Preciado	Clay; Salazar	2:43
5.	"Necesito Un Segundo"	Figueroa; Torres; Rengifo; Edgar Barrera	Torres; Rengifo	2:24
6.	"Como Tú y Yo"	Figueroa; Arbise González; Rafael Regginalds; Servando Primera	Salazar; Motiff	3:13
7.	"Vivir Bonito"	Figueroa; Julio Reyes; Marrufo; Pabón	Clay; Salazar	2:36
8.	"Se Me Quedó"	Figueroa; Luis Salazar; Regginalds	Salazar; Clay	2:58
9.	"Te Amo y Punto"	Figueroa; Andrea Mangiamarchi; López; Barrera	Salazar; Clay	2:46
Total length:				24:22

== Charts ==
Weekly chart performance for Bailemos Otra Vez
Chart (2023)	Peak position
Spanish Albums (PROMUSICAE)	26
US Top Latin Albums (Billboard)	35
US Latin Pop Albums (Billboard)	3

== Certifications ==
Certifications for Bailemos Otra Vez
Region	Certification	Certified units/sales
United States (RIAA)	Platinum (Latin)	60,000^{‡}
^{‡} Sales+streaming figures based on certification alone.
