= Completamente Enamorados =

Single by Chayanne

from the album Tiempo de Vals
- Released: 1990
- Recorded: 1989–1990; Ameraycan Recording Studios; A&M Records (Los Angeles, California); Capitol Recording Studios; Ocean Way Recording Studios (Hollywood, California); Critiera Recording Studios (Miami, Florida); Musigrama; Eurosonic; Sonoland Studios (Madrid, Spain); Unique Recording Studios (New York City)
- Genre: Latin
- Length: 4:21
- Label: CBS Discos
- Composers: Eros Ramazzotti; Piero Cassano
- Lyricists: Luis Gómez-Escolar (Spanish); Adelio Cogliati (Italian)

Chayanne singles chronology
"Dile al Todo el Mundo No" (1990)	"Completamente Enamorados" (1990)	"Simon Sez" (1990)

Completamente Enamorados (English: Completely in Love) is a ballad written by Adelio Cogliati, Piero Cassano and Eros Ramazzotti. Originally titled "Un Nuovo Amore" ("A New Love"), the song was performed by Italian singer-songwriter Ramazzotti in his second album Nuovi eroi, released in 1986. Two years later the song was re-recorded in Spanish on the Spanish language version of his album Música Es, released in 1988. Two years later it was covered by Puerto Rican singer Chayanne, and this version was released as the first single of his album Tiempo de Vals (1990). The song peaked at number one in the Billboard Hot Latin Tracks chart (now Top Latin Songs) in late 1990 and was nominated for Pop Song of the Year at the Lo Nuestro Awards.

Chayanne's version of the song debuted in the Billboard Hot Latin Tracks chart at number 28 in the week of September 8, 1990, climbing to the top ten three weeks later. "Completamente Enamorados" peaked at number-one on October 20, 1990, replacing "Peligroso Amor" by Chilean performer Myriam Hernández and being succeeded by "Entrégate" by Mexican performer Luis Miguel five weeks later.

== Music video ==
A music video was shot in 1990 in New York City. It was included in Grandes Exitos DVD. It was nominated in the category of Best Video by a Male Artist in the Latin field.

== Certifications ==
Region	Certification	Certified units/sales
Mexico (AMPROFON)	Platinum+Gold	90,000^{‡}
^{‡} Sales+streaming figures based on certification alone.

== See also ==
- List of number-one Billboard Hot Latin Tracks of 1990
