= No Hay Imposibles =

2010 studio album by Chayanne

Studio album by Chayanne
- Released: February 23, 2010
- Recorded: October–December 2009
- Studio: Picks And Hammers; PinEs (Hialeah, FL); Setai Recording Studio; The Hit Factory (Critiera); The Tiki Room; Pembroke (Miami, FL)
- Genre: Latin pop; dance-pop; soft rock; latin ballad
- Length: 42:48
- Label: Sony Music Latin
- Producer: Julio C. Reyes; José Gentile; Sebastián Krys; Sebastián de Peyrecave; Carlos Ponce; René L. Toledo

Chayanne chronology
Vivo (2008)	No Hay Imposibles (2010)	A Solas Con Chayanne (2012)

Singles from No Hay Imposibles
- 1. "Me Enamoré De Tí" Released: November 16, 2009; 2. "Tú Boca" Released: April 12, 2010; 3. "Díme" Released: May 17, 2010; 4. "Siento" Released: June 28, 2010; 5. "Si No Estás" Released: July 19, 2010; 6. "Me Pierdo Contigo" Released: January 3, 2011

No Hay Imposibles (English: There Are Not Impossibles) is the 14th studio album recorded by Puerto Rican Latin pop singer and recording artist Chayanne. This album was released by Sony Music Latin on February 23, 2010 (see 2010 in music).

== Track list ==
No.	Title	Writer(s)	Producer (es)	Length
1.	"Si No Estás"	Carlos Alberto de Yarza; Carlos Ponce	Javier Díaz; Julio Reyes Copello	4:21
2.	"Me Pierdo Contigo"	Javier Díaz; Clarissa Lewis; Paolo Tondo; Carlos Celles	Javier Díaz; Julio Reyes Copello	3:57
3.	"Por Esa Mujer"	Ramón Casillas; Gabriel Cruz Padilla "Wise"	Gabriel Cruz Padilla "Wise"	3:48
4.	"Me Enamoré de Tí"	Paolo Tondo; Ángel López; Javier Díaz; Carlos Celles; Mauricio A. Perdoza; Jorge Eduardo Munguía	Javier Díaz; Julio Reyes Copello	4:24
5.	"Siento"	Leonel García	Sebastián Krys	3:50
6.	"Díme"	Jandy Felíz	René Luis Toledo	3:43
7.	"Tú Boca"	Jandy Felíz	Pablo Durant	3:23
8.	"Besos en la Boca" (Beijar Na Boca)	Rogerio Tomich · Blanch Van Gogh small>Lyrics: Spanish: Patty Vega	Sebastián Krys	3:01
9.	"El Hombre Que Fuí"	Javier Díaz; Robert Elías J. Álvarez; Carlos Celles	Sebastián Krys	3:51
10.	"No Hay Imposibles"	José Gentile; Daniel Hamuy	José Gentile; Sebastián de Peyrecave	5:09
11.	"Dáme, Dáme"	Freddy Piñero, Jr.; Carlos Ponce	Sebastián Krys	3:28

== Music videos ==
1. Me Enamoré de Tí
2. Tú Boca
3. Si No Estás

== Reception ==
Professional ratings
Review scores
Source	Rating
Allmusic	5/5 stars

David Jeffries of Allmusic gave the album a 3.5 out of 5 star rating who felt the album is "still filled with the enthusiasm and conviction" despite the lack of originality by the artist.

== Charts ==
=== Weekly charts ===
Chart (2010)	Peak position
Mexican Albums (AMPROFON)	1
Spanish Albums (PROMUSICAE)	2
US Billboard 200	23
US Top Latin Albums (Billboard)	1
US Latin Pop Albums (Billboard)	1

=== Year-end charts ===
Chart (2010)	Position
US Top Latin Albums (Billboard)	8
Chart (2011)	Position
US Top Latin Albums (Billboard)	70

== Sales and certifications ==
Region	Certification	Certified units/sales
Argentina (CAPIF)	Gold	20,000^{^}
Mexico (AMPROFON)	2× Platinum	120,000^{‡}
United States (RIAA)	Platinum (Latin)	100,000^{^}
^{^} Shipments figures based on certification alone.^{‡} Sales+streaming figures based on certification alone.

== See also ==
- List of number-one albums of 2010 (Mexico)
- List of number-one Billboard Latin Pop Albums of 2010
- List of number-one Billboard Latin Albums from the 2010s
