= Sincero =

Studio album by Chayanne
- Released: August 26, 2003
- Recorded: 2002–2003
- Studio: Crescent Moon Studios; The Hit Factory Critiera; Midnight Blue Studios (Miami, FL)
- Genre: Latin pop; dance-pop; soft rock; Latin rock; Latin ballad
- Length: 47:09
- Label: Sony Discos
- Producer: René L. Toledo; Franco De Vita; Rey Sánchez; Estéfano; Julio C. Reyes; Luis Fernando Ochoa; Patty Bolívar (Executive producer)

Chayanne chronology
Grandes Éxitos (2002)	Sincero (2003)	Desde Siempre (2005)

Singles from Sincero
- 1. "Un Siglo Sin Ti" Released: June 30, 2003; 2. "Caprichosa" Released: October 20, 2003; 3. "Cuidarte el Alma" Released: December 15, 2003; 4. "Sentada Aquí en mi Alma" Released: March 15, 2004; 5. "Santa Sofía" Released: May 3, 2004; 6. "Vaivén" Released: June 28, 2004

Sincero (English: Sincere) is the 11th studio album recorded by Puerto Rican-American recording artist Chayanne. This album was released by Sony Discos on August 26, 2003 (see 2003 in music). This album became his second number-one set on the Billboard Top Latin Albums and received a nomination for a Grammy Award for Best Latin Pop Album in the 46th Annual Grammy Awards on February 8, 2004, losing to No Es lo Mismo by Alejandro Sanz.

The album spawned six singles with the lead single Un Siglo Sin Tí being certified gold in Chile.

== Track listing ==
The track listing from Billboard.com

No.	Title	Writer(s)	Producer (es)	Length
1.	"Sentada Aquí en Mi Alma"	Estéfano · Julio C. Reyes	Estéfano	4:03
2.	"Quédate Conmigo"	Estéfano · José Luis Pagán	Estéfano	4:11
3.	"Caprichosa"	Juan Miguel Mogica	Luis Fernando Ochoa	3:06
4.	"Un siglo sin ti"	Franco De Vita	René Luis Toledo	4:41
5.	"Vaivén"	Francisco José Bastante Estepa · Nuria Díaz Reguera · Raquel Díaz Reguera	René Luis Toledo	4:33
6.	"Santa Sofía"	Estéfano · Julio C. Reyes	Estéfano	3:35
7.	"Cuidarte el Alma"	Cristian Zalles · Marc Durandeau	Luis Fernando Ochoa	4:13
8.	"La Mujer de Pedro"	Cristian Zalles	Rey Sánchez	4:38
9.	"Al Pan, Pan y Al Vino, Vino"	Juan Miguel Mogica	René Luis Toledo	3:51
10.	"No Hay Más"	Chris Rodriguez · Javier Carrión · Lilly Ponce · Miguel Cosculluela	René Luis Toledo	3:25
11.	"Dulce y Peligrosa"	Estéfano	Estéfano	3:53
12.	"Caprichosa" (Spanglish)	Juan Miguel Mogica; English: Lyrics by: Chayanne · Cheryl Sánchez · Rey Sánchez	Luis Fernando Ochoa	3:06
Total length:				47:09

== Music videos ==
1. Un Siglo Sin Tí
2. Caprichosa
3. Sentada Aquí En Mi Alma

== Credits and personnel ==
The information form AllMusic.

- Estéfano — Producer
- Julio C. Reyes – Producer, Composer, Arranger, Programmer
- Rey Sánchez — Producer
- Franco De Vita – Producer, Composer, Arranger
- René L. Toledo — Producer
- Luis Fernando Ochoa — Producer
- Patty Bolívar — Executive producer
- Mauricio Gasca — Arranger, Programming, Engineer
- Vlado Meller — Mastering
- José Luis Pagán — Guitar, arranger, programming, vocals
- Ángel Carrasco — A&R
- Mario Houben — Graphic design
- Kevin Apple — Photography
- Kelly Nash — Make-Up

© MMIII. Sony Music Entertainment Inc.

== Chart performance ==
Chart (2003)	Peak position
Argentine Albums (CAPIF)	1
Switzerland (Swiss Hitparade)	89
U.S. Billboard Top Latin Albums	1
U.S. Billboard Latin Pop Albums	1
U.S. Billboard 200	87

== Sales and certifications ==
Region	Certification	Certified units/sales
Argentina (CAPIF)	3× Platinum	120,000^{^}
Chile (IFPI Chile)	Platinum	36,000
Mexico (AMPROFON)	2× Platinum+Gold	250,000^{‡}
Spain (PROMUSICAE)	Gold	50,000^{^}
United States (RIAA)	2× Platinum (Latin)	200,000^{^}
^{^} Shipments figures based on certification alone.^{‡} Sales+streaming figures based on certification alone.
