= Chayanne (1987 album) =

Studio album by Chayanne
- Released: May 1987
- Recorded: 1987; Los Angeles, California
- Genre: Latin pop
- Length: 40:19 (Una Luna Para Dos edition); 40:48 (Esperanza edition)
- Label: CBS Columbia
- Producer: Ronnie Foster

Chayanne chronology
Sangre Latina (1986)	Chayanne (1987)	Chayanne (1988)

Singles from Chayanne
- 1. "Te Deseo" Released: 1987; 2. "Fiesta En América" Released: 1987; 3. "Violeta" Released: 1987; 4. "Peligro de Amor" Released: 1988; 5. "Para Tenerte Otra Vez" Released: 1988

Chayanne is the third album from Puerto Rican artist Chayanne, released on Sony in 1987, and his first album under that label.

== Background ==
Chayanne is the first album by the singer released by CBS Columbia (now Sony Music Entertainment) and was produced by Ronnie Foster. "Fiesta En America" and "Peligro de Amor" peaked at number four on the Billboard Hot Latin Tracks chart. "Fiesta En America" ranked 49th in the 2008 recap for the '100 Greatest Songs of the 80's in Spanish' by VH1 Latin America. In 1988, the album was released in Portuguese for Brazil which included "Não Posso Mais Viver Assim", a Portuguese cover of the Italian song "L'Amore È Quando Non C'è Più", originally performed by the Italian singer Euro Cristiani in 1979. The song was never released version in Spanish. In the 1988 Spanish version re-release, the song, "Una Luna Para Dos", was removed and replaced with "Esperanza". The album was reissued on Compact Disc on December 28, 1989.

The album debuted on the Billboard Top Latin Pop Albums chart at #19 in the week of February 27, 1988.

== Track listing ==
LP version
No.	Title	Writer(s)	Length
1.	"Fiesta En América"	Honorio Herrero	3:44
2.	"Digo No"	Javier Losada, Daniel Maroto	3:53
3.	"Para Tenerte Otra Vez (I'll Find My Way Home)"	Vangelis, Jon Anderson, adapt. Gustavo Sánchez	5:07
4.	"Peligro de Amor (Amanhã Talvez)"	Michael Sullivan, Paulo Massadas, adapt. Luis Gómez-Escolar	4:04
5.	"Tu y Yo"	Ronnie Foster, Kim Miracle, adapt. Eddie del Barrio, Gustavo Sánchez	4:20
6.	"Violeta (Fricote)"	Luis Caldas, Paulinho Camafeu, adapt. Rosa Girón	3:31
7.	"Quien Soy Yo"	Mariano Pérez, Jose Garcia Morato, Rosa Giron	3:42
8.	"Te Deseo"	Luis Gomez-Escolar, Julio Seijas	3:51
9.	"Emociones Cuantas Emociones (Emozione Dopo Emozione)"	Eros Ramazzotti, Adelio Cogliati, Piero Cassano, adapt. Gustavo Sánchez	4:44
10.	"Una Luna Para Dos"	Edgard B. Poças, Paul Mounsey adapt. Luis Gómez-Escolar	3:23

CD version
No.	Title	Writer(s)	Length
10.	"Esperanza"	Luis Demien adapt. Rosa Girón	3:52

Brazilian version
No.	Title	Writer(s)	Length
1.	"Canta America (Fiesta en America)"	Honorio Herrero, adapt. Edgard B. Poças	3:44
2.	"Sempre Vou Te Amar (Emociones Cuantas Emociones)"	Eros Ramazzotti, Adelio Cogliati, Piero Cassano, adapt. Aloysio Reis	4:44
3.	"Não Posso Mais Viver Assim (L'Amore E' Quando Non C'e' Piu)"	Umberto Tozzi, Giancarlo Bigazzi, adapt. Aloysio Reis	3:48
4.	"Para Tenerte Otra Vez"	Vangelis, Jon Anderson, adapt. Gustavo Sánchez	5:07
5.	"Quien Soy Yo"	Mariano Pérez, Jose Garcia Morato, Rosa Giron	3:42
6.	"Digo Não (Digo No)"	Javier Losada, Daniel Maroto, adapt. Paulo Camargo	3:53
7.	"Tô Gostando de Você (Una Luna Para Dos)"	Edgard B. Poças, Paul Mounsey	3:23
8.	"Violeta"	Luis Caldas, Paulinho Camafeu, adapt. Rosa Girón	3:31
9.	"Peligro de Amor"	Michael Sullivan, Paulo Massadas, adapt. Luis Gómez-Escolar	4:04
10.	"Tu y Yo"	Ronnie Foster, Kim Miracle, adapt. Eddie del Barrio, Gustavo Sánchez	4:20

== Music videos ==
1. Fiesta En America
2. Digo No
3. Para Tenerte Otra Vez
4. Peligro de Amor
5. Tu y Yo
6. Violeta
7. Te Deseo
8. Una Luna Para Dos

== Personnel ==
- Ronnie Foster — Producer, Arranger, Choral Arranger ("Tu y Yo" only)
- Oscar Goméz — Associated Producer, Choral Arranger
- Eddie del Barrio — Arranger
- Keith Seppanen — Sound Engineer
- Jorge del Barrio — String Arranger

== Singles ==
Year of release	Single	U.S. Latin
1987	"Fiesta en America"	4
1988	"Peligro de Amor"	4
1988	"Te Deseo"	43

== Release history ==
Region	Date	Format	Version
Latin America	May 1987	LP	Original
Latin America	1988	CD	Re-release
Latin America	December 28, 1989	CD	Re-release
