= Cautivo =

2005 studio album by Chayanne

Studio album by Chayanne
- Released: September 27, 2005
- Recorded: May – July 2005
- Studio: The Music Den; The Red Door Studio; Sonic Project Studios; Cuero Room Studio; South Beach Studios; The Tiki Room; Someillan Production; New Miami Studio; The Hit Factory (Critiera); The Warehouse Studios (Miami, FL); The Pass Studios (Los Angeles, CA); Entourage 5.1 Studio (North Hollywood, CA)
- Genre: Latin pop; soft rock; latin ballad
- Length: 37:51
- Language: Spanish
- Label: Sony BMG Norte
- Producer: René L. Toledo; Joel Someillán; Carlos Ponce; Freddy Piñero, Jr.; Gustavo Arenas; Carlos Alberto de Yarza; Javier Díaz; John M. Falcone; Patty Díaz (Executive producer)

Chayanne chronology
Desde Siempre (2005)	Cautivo (2005)	Mi Tiempo (2007)

Singles from Cautivo
- 1. "No Te Preocupes por Mí" Released: August 1, 2005; 2. "Te Echo de Menos" Released: January 16, 2006; 3. "No Se Por Qué" Released: July 31, 2006

Cautivo (English: Captive) is the 12th studio album recorded by Puerto Rican-American recording artist Chayanne. The album witch released by Sony BMG Norte on September 27, 2005 (see 2005 in music). This album became his third number-one set on the Billboard Top Latin Albums, and includes the singles "No Te Preocupes Por Mí", "Te Echo de Menos" and "No Sé Por Qué".

== Album history ==
The album was produced by René L. Toledo, co-produced by Joel Someillán, Carlos Ponce, Freddy Piñero Jr., Gustavo Arenas, Carlos Alberto de Yarza, Javier Díaz, John M. Falcone and was released by Sony BMG Norte in late September 2005 on three formats: standard, enhanced (with bonus materials) and DualDisc (including the same track listing and bonus materials). It debuted at number one in the Billboard Top Latin Albums chart, replacing Fijación Oral Vol. 1 by Shakira and being replaced one week later by Más Capaces que Nunca by K-Paz de la Sierra.

From this album three singles were released, "No Te Preocupes Por Mí", the lead single which peaked at number 6 on the Billboard Hot Latin Tracks, "Te Echo de Menos" and "No Sé Por Qué", reaching number 15 and 16 on the same chart, respectively.

At the 7th Annual Latin Grammy Awards Cautivo received two nominations, Album of the Year and Best Male Pop Vocal Album, winning none.

== Track listing ==
The track listing from Billboard.com

No.	Title	Writer(s)	Producer (es)	Length
1.	"Te Echo de Menos"	Freddy Piñero, Jr.; Carlos Ponce	Freddy Piñeiro, Jr.; Carlos Ponce	3:29
2.	"No Te Preocupes por Mí"	Freddy Piñero, Jr.; Tom McWilliams; Carlos Ponce	Freddy Piñeiro, Jr.; Carlos Ponce	3:29
3.	"Cúrame"	Carlos Ponce; Joel Someillán	Carlos Ponce; Joel Someillán	3:33
4.	"No Sé Por Qué"	Claudia Brant; Jorge Luis Piloto	Javier Díaz; Gustavo Arenas	4:20
5.	"Después de Todo"	Yasmil Marrufo; Cristian Zalles	René Luis Toledo	4:31
6.	"Swing"	Lilly Ponce; Carlos Ponce; Joel Someillán	Carlos Ponce; Joel Someillán	3:09
7.	"Nada Sin Tu Amor"	Lilly Ponce; Carlos Ponce; Joel Someillán	Carlos Ponce; Joel Someillán	3:13
8.	"En La Orilla"	John M. Falcone; Carlos Alberto de Yarza; Carlos Ponce	John M. Falcone; Carlos Alberto de Yarza; Carlos Ponce	3:51
9.	"Me Llenas de Tí"	Jorge Luis Piloto; Yoel Henríquez	René Luis Toledo	4:19
10.	"Antes de Dormir"	Pablo Herrera; Cristian Zalles	René Luis Toledo	4:02
Total length:				37:51

== Music videos ==
1. "No Te Preocupes Por Mí"
2. "Te Echo De Menos"
3. "No Sé Por Qué"

== Personnel ==
- Carlos Álvarez - mezcla
- Gustavo Arenas - arranger, keyboards, producer, programming
- Carlos Bedoya - engineer
- Manny Benito - vocal director
- Richard Bravo - percussion
- Ed Calle - saxophone
- Jorge Casas - bajos
- Huifang Chen - violin
- Angie Chirino - coros
- Kurt Coble - violin
- Michael "Junno" Cosculluela - coros
- Javier Díaz - producer
- John DiPuccio - violin
- Chris Glansdorp - cello
- Jim Hacker - trumpet
- Femio Hernández - production assistant
- Julio Hernández - bajo sexto
- Dina Kostic - violin
- John Kricker - trombone
- Manny López - acoustic guitar, electric guitar
- Juan Cristobal Losada - engineer
- Ricardo Eddy Martínez - arranger, bajo sexto
- Patricia Masterson - engineer, production assistant
- Alfredo Oliva - director, violin
- Archie Peña - percussion
- Clay Perry - arranger, piano
- Rachel Perry - coros
- Freddy Piñero Jr. - arranger, coros, engineer, mixing, producer
- Carlos Ponce - producer
- Lilly Ponce - coros
- John "JR" Robinson, Lee Levin - drums
- Cesar Sogbe - engineer
- Joel Someillan - coros, keyboards, Hammond organ, producer, programming
- René Luis Toledo - arranger, guitar, producer
- Dan Warner - guitar
- Woody Woodruff - engineer

== Chart performance ==
Chart (2005)	Peak position
Spain PROMUSICAE Album Chart	7
US Billboard Top Latin Albums	1
US Billboard Latin Pop Albums	1
US Billboard 200	62

== Sales and certifications ==
Region	Certification	Certified units/sales
Argentina (CAPIF)	Platinum	40,000^{^}
Mexico (AMPROFON)	Platinum	100,000^{^}
Mexico (AMPROFON) Bonus tracks version	Gold	50,000^{‡}
Spain (PROMUSICAE)	Gold	50,000^{^}
United States (RIAA)	2× Platinum (Latin)	200,000^{^}
^{^} Shipments figures based on certification alone.^{‡} Sales+streaming figures based on certification alone.
