= Volver a Nacer =

Studio album by Chayanne
- Released: September 17, 1996
- Recorded: May – August 1996
- Studio: After House; Music Design Studios; Riot Music; South Beach Studios (Miami, FL); Brimmer Music Co (Thousand Oaks, CA); O'Henry Studios (Burbank, CA)
- Genre: Latin pop; dance-pop; soft rock; latin ballad
- Length: 45:36
- Label: Sony Latin
- Producer: Marcello Azevedo; Estéfano; Donato Póveda; Hal S. Batt; Manny Benito; Ronnie Foster; Steve Roitsein

Chayanne chronology
Influencias (1994)	Volver a Nacer (1996)	Atado a Tu Amor (1998)

Singles from Volver a Nacer
- 1. "Sólamente Tu Amor" Released: August 5, 1996; 2. "Sólo Traigo Mi Ritmo" Released: November 4, 1996; 3. "Baila, Baila" Released: November 18, 1996; 4. "Volver a Nacer" Released: January 6, 1997; 5. "Tal Vez Es Amor" Released: May 5, 1997; 6. "Entre Mis Recuerdos" Released: August 4, 1997; 7. "Guajira" Released: September 29, 1997; 8. "Sólo Pienso En Tí" Released: December 8, 1997

Professional ratings
Review scores
Source	Rating
Allmusic	4.5/5 stars

Volver a Nacer (English: Born Again) is the seventh studio album and eighth overall recorded by Puerto Rican-American recording artist Chayanne. This album was released by Sony Latin on September 17, 1996. The album was produced by Marcello Azevedo, co-produced by Estéfano, Donato Póveda, Hal S. Batt, Manny Benito, Ronnie Foster and Steve Roitsein. The album was a hit amongst the Latin Americans, which led to success to the Top Latin Albums Chart, peaking at number 33.

== Track listing ==
No.	Title	Writer(s)	Producer(s)	Length
1.	"Sólo Traigo Mi Ritmo"	Estéfano · Ximena Zapata	Estéfano	3:48
2.	"Solamente Tu Amor"	Donato Póveda · Hal S. Batt	Donato Póveda · Hal S. Batt	3:25
3.	"Pequeña Flor" (Petite Fleur)	S. Bechet; Lyrics: Spanish: Luis Gómez-Escolar	Ronnie Foster	3:35
4.	"Volver a Nacer"	Estéfano · Ximena Zapata	Estéfano	4:56
5.	"Voy a Enseñarte"	Kike Santander	Steve Roitsein	3:55
6.	"Tal Vez Es Amor" (Tal vez Seja Amor)	A. César · P. S. Valle; Lyrics: Spanish: Luis Gómez-Escolar	Ronnie Foster	4:35
7.	"Baila, Baila"	Donato Póveda · Hal S. Batt	Donato Póveda · Hal S. Batt	3:52
8.	"Sólo Pienso En Tí"	Víctor Manuel San José	Ronnie Foster	4:56
9.	"Ramito de Flores"	Ángel "Cucco" Peña	Steve Roitstein	4:16
10.	"Entre Mis Recuerdos"	Albert Hammond · H. Knight	Ronnie Foster	3:47
11.	"Guajira"	Papo Gely	Steve Roitstein	4:33
Total length:				45:36

© MCMXCVI. Sony Music Entertainment Inc.

== Music videos ==
1. Sólamente Tu Amor
2. Baila, Baila [Meme's Boriqua Mix]
3. Volver a Nacer
4. Guajira

== Charts ==
Chart (1996)	Peak position
U.S. Billboard Top Latin Albums	33
U.S. Billboard Latin Pop Albums	15

== Sales and certifications ==
Region	Certification	Certified units/sales
Argentina (CAPIF)	2× Platinum	120,000^{^}
Mexico (AMPROFON)	Gold	100,000^{‡}
^{^} Shipments figures based on certification alone.^{‡} Sales+streaming figures based on certification alone.
