= Provócame =

Studio album by Chayanne
- Released: August 14, 1992
- Recorded: 1991–1992
- Studios: A&M Studios, Los Angeles; Ocean Way Recording Studios, Los Angeles; Critiera Moon Studios, Miami; South Beach Studios, Miami
- Genres: Latin pop; dance
- Length: 46:18
- Label: CBS Columbia
- Producer: Gustavo Sánchez

Chayanne chronology
Tiempo de Vals (1990)	Provócame (1992)	Influencias (1994)

Singles from Provócame
- 1. "El Centro de Mi Corazón" Released: 1992; 2. "Provócame" Released: 1992; 3. "Todo el Mundo Necesita Un Beso" Released: 1992; 4. "El Arte de Amar" Released: 1992; 5. "Mi Primer Amor" Released: 1993; 6. "Isla Desnuda" Released: 1993; 7. "Éxtasis" Released: 1993; 8. "Dime Lo Que Quieres Que Haga" Released: 1993

Provócame (Turn Me On) is the sixth album recorded by the Puerto Rican performer Chayanne. The album was released by CBS Columbia on August 14, 1992.

== Track listing ==
No.	Title	Writer(s)	Length
1.	"Provócame (Turn Me On)"	J. van Katwijk · M. Schimscheimer adapt. H. Herrero · G. Sánchez	4:09
2.	"El Centro de Mi Corazón"	A. Vezzani	3:50
3.	"Isla Desnuda"	J. L. Piloto	3:53
4.	"Mi Primer Amor (Wishing on the Same Star)"	D. Warren adapt. H. Herrero · G. Sánchez	4:19
5.	"Mimi"	M. Tena	3:28
6.	"El Arte de Amar"	I. Chester	3:41
7.	"Dime Lo Que Quieres Que Haga"	R. Pérez	4:17
8.	"Todo el Mundo Necesita Un Beso"	H. Herrero	4:29
9.	"No Puede Ser"	E. Del Barrio	5:18
10.	"Socca Dance"	C. D. Lewis · G. Gordon-Smith adapt. H. Herrero · G. Sánchez	4:26
11.	"Éxtasis (Je t'aime... moi non plus)"	S. Gainsbourg adapt. H. Herrero · G. Sánchez	4:27
Total length:			46:18

== Chart performance ==
Chart (1992)	Peak position
US Top Latin Albums (Billboard)	36
US Latin Pop Albums (Billboard)	3

== Sales and certifications ==
Region	Certification	Certified units/sales
Chile	Platinum	
Colombia	Platinum	
Mexico (AMPROFON)	Gold	100,000^{‡}
Venezuela	Platinum	
^{‡} Sales+streaming figures based on certification alone.
