= Chayanne (1988 album) =

Studio album by Chayanne
- Released: November 22, 1988
- Recorded: 1988
- Studio: Critiera Recording Studios (Miami, Florida); Capitol Recording Studios; Ocean Way Recording Studios (Hollywood, California)
- Genre: Latin pop; dance
- Length: 38:15
- Label: CBS Discos
- Producer: Ronnie Foster

Chayanne chronology
Chayanne (1987)	Chayanne (1988)	Tiempo de Vals (1990)

Singles from Chayanne
- 1. "Tu Pirata Soy Yo" Released: 1988; 2. "Palo Bonito" Released: 1988; 3. "Este Ritmo Se Baila Así" Released: 1989; 4. "Fuiste un Trozo de Hielo en la Escarcha" Released: 1989; 5. "Fantasías" Released: 1989; 6. "Marinero" Released: 1989; 7. "Dile al Todo el Mundo No" Released: 1990

Professional ratings
Review scores
Source	Rating
AllMusic	3/5 stars

Chayanne (also known as Chayanne II) is the fourth studio album recorded by Puerto Rican performer Chayanne. It was released by CBS Discos on November 22, 1988. This album is the second released under the Sony record label, after the successful, also self-titled, previous album. This release includes a blend of ballads and dance songs, that would be the singer trademark through his career. The four singles yielded from this album peaked within the Top Ten in the Billboard Hot Latin Tracks chart: "Tu Pirata Soy Yo", "Este Ritmo Se Baila Así", "Fantasías", and the number-one song "Fuiste un Trozo de Hielo en la Escarcha". Unlike his previous album, also titled Chayanne, all music from the LP version is available in the CD Version.

Considered as the album that took off his solo career, earned the singer his first Grammy Award nomination, a Lo Nuestro Award, a MTV Video Music Award and a contract with Pepsi to promote the beverage.

== Background ==
After the successful self-titled album released in 1987, which included one of Chayanne's signature songs, "Fiesta en América", a track that peaked at number 4 in the Billboard Hot Latin Tracks chart and also ranked 49th in the 2008 recap for the '100 Greatest Songs of the 80's in Spanish' by VH1 Latin America, the singer recorded in 1988 his second self-titled album under the Sony record label. The following year, Chayanne signed a contract with Pepsi to record the first Spanish language commercial aired in the United States on a major TV network without subtitles or dubbing, debuted during the Grammy Awards that year. Chayanne received a Grammy Award nomination for Best Latin Pop Performance, which it lost to José Feliciano's rendition of "Cielito Lindo". During this year, the singer also won the Lo Nuestro Award for Pop Male Artist and the album was nominated for Pop Album of the Year. "Este Ritmo Se Baila Así", the third single from this release, won the MTV Video Music Award in 1989 as the International Viewer's Choice. The album was re-released 1989 and then in 2000 with the same track list.

== Music ==
The album includes ten tracks, mostly covers of songs previously recorded by several performers. The lead track and first single "Tu Pirata Soy Yo" ("I Am Your Pirate") is a ballad written by Honorio Herrero, who also wrote Chayanne's previous hit "Fiesta en América". "Pata Pata" is a cover version of the signature song of Miriam Makeba, who is featured on this new version. "Este Ritmo Se Baila Así" is also a cover version of the 1987 song "Sye Bwa" by the Francophone zouk band Kassav'. Record producer Roberto Livi made the Spanish adaptation of this song. "Fantasías", is a ballad first performed by his writer, Brazilian singer-songwriter José Augusto. The song was translated and adapted by Luis Gómez-Escolar. "Fuiste un Trozo de Hielo en la Escarcha" was written by Spanish singer-songwriter José María Cano (of the Mecano fame). "Tengo Esperanza (Gritos de Guerra)" was first performed by Brazilian Axé music band Chiclete com Banana in 1987, and included on their album Gritos de Guerra. The Spanish adaptation was made by Juan Mardi.

== Track listing ==
No.	Title	Writer(s)	Length
1.	"Tu Pirata Soy Yo"	Honorio Herrero	2:53
2.	"Dile a Todo el Mundo No"	Ronnie Foster • Roberto Livi	4:28
3.	"Fuiste un Trozo de Hielo en la Escarcha"	J. M. Cano	4:45
4.	"Pata-Pata" (duet with Miriam Makeba)	Miriam Makeba • Jerry Ragovoy • adapt. Juan Mardi	4:15
5.	"Palo Bonito"	Ricardo Rico	3:48
6.	"Este Ritmo se Baila Así (Sye Bwa)"	Pierre-Edouard Decimus (Kassav') • Jacob Desvarieux (Kassav') • adapt. Roberto Livi	4:28
7.	"Marinero"	José Luis Perales	3:51
8.	"Fantasías"	José Augusto • adapt. Luis Gómez-Escolar	4:30
9.	"Tengo Esperanza (Gritos de Guerra)"	Bell Marques • Wadinho Marques • adapt. Juan Mardi	3:18
10.	"Conquistador"	Alejandro Vezzani • Gustavo Sánchez	3:25

== Music videos ==
1. Tu Pirata Soy Yo
2. Fuiste un Trozo de Hielo En La Escarcha
3. Este Ritmo Se Baila Asi
4. Fantasias

== Chart performance ==
=== Album ===
Chart (1988)	Peak position
U.S. Billboard Latin Pop Albums	3

=== Singles ===
Year of release	Single	U.S. HLT
1988	"Tu Pirata Soy Yo"	4
1989	"Este Ritmo Se Baila Así"	3
1989	"Fuiste un Trozo de Hielo en la Escarcha"	1
1989	"Fantasías"	8

== Certifications ==
Region	Certification	Certified units/sales
Mexico (AMPROFON)	2× Platinum	500,000^{‡}
^{‡} Sales+streaming figures based on certification alone.

== Release history ==
Region	Date	Format	Version
Latin America	1988	LP, CD	Original
Latin America	1988	CD	Original
Latin America	January 1, 1989	CD	Re-release
Latin America	2000	CD	Re-release
