= Simplemente (Chayanne album) =

2000 studio album by Chayanne

Studio album by Chayanne
- Released: October 3, 2000
- Recorded: 2000
- Studio: Bam Studios (Stockholm, Sweden); Bimmer Music Studios (Thousand Oaks, CA); Capitol Studios (Hollywood, CA); Crescent Moon Studios; The Hit Factory Critiera; Living Stereo Studios; Midnight Blue Studios; South Point Studios (Miami, FL); The Gentlemen's Club Studios (Miami Beach, FL)
- Genre: Latin pop; dance-pop; soft rock; latin ballad
- Length: 54:32
- Label: Sony Discos
- Producer: Estéfano; Donato Póveda; Marcello Azevedo; Léster Méndez; René Luis Toledo; Ronnie Foster; Manny Benito; Desmond Child

Chayanne chronology
Atado a Tu Amor (1998)	Simplemente (2000)	Grandes Éxitos (2002)

Singles from Simplemente
- 1. "Yo Te Amo" Released: September 4, 2000; 2. "Boom, Boom" Released: December 11, 2000; 3. "Ay, Mamá" Released: January 15, 2001; 4. "Candela" Released: February 26, 2001; 5. "Simplemente" Released: March 12, 2001; 6. "Hasta Que el Alma Resista" Released: April 16, 2001; 7. "Mariana Mambo" Released: May 7, 2001; 8. "Vivo" Released: June 4, 2001; 9. "¿Quién Puso Más?" Released: August 6, 2001

Simplemente (English: Simply) is the tenth studio album recorded by Puerto Rican-American recording artist Chayanne. The album witch released by Sony Discos on October 3, 2000 (see 2000 in music).

On February 6, 2001, this album was released with two bonus tracks.

It received a nomination for a Grammy Award for Best Latin Pop Album in the 44th Annual Grammy Awards, held on Wednesday, February 27, 2002. The album was certified gold and platinum in several countries and is considered to be one of the best-selling albums in Chile.

== Track listing ==
No.	Title	Writer(s)	Producer (es)	Length
1.	"Simplemente"	Estéfano	Estéfano	3:56
2.	"Las Horas Pasan"	Estéfano	Estéfano	3:41
3.	"Candela"	Donato Póveda · Érika Ender	Léster Méndez	3:56
4.	"Yo Te Amo"	Estéfano	Estéfano	4:50
5.	"Hasta Que el Alma Resista"	Estéfano	Estéfano	4:23
6.	"Ay, Mamá"	Donato Póveda · Érika Ender	Estéfano	3:45
7.	"Cuando un Amor Se Va" (Feat. Rubén Bladés)	Rubén Bladés	René Luis Toledo	4:28
8.	"Oye Mar" (Canção Do Mar)	Federico De Brito · Ferrer Trinidade; Lyrics: Spanish: Luis Gómez-Escolar · Estéfano	René Luis Toledo	4:56
9.	"Mariana Mambo"	Estéfano	Estéfano	3:58
10.	"¿Quién Puso Más?"	Víctor Manuel San José	Léster Méndez	4:46
11.	"Mi Cafetal"	Crecencio Salcedo	Léster Méndez · Manny Benito	2:52
12.	"Te Necesito" (Aprender a Amar)	Luis Fernándo Oliveira Da Silva · Ricardo Georges Feghali; Lyrics: Spanish: Luis Gómez-Escolar · Estéfano	Ronnie Foster	3:52
13.	"Vivo" (Alive)	Andreas Carlsson · Desmond Child; Lyrics: Spanish: Chayanne · Manny López · Manny Benito · Estéfano	Manny Benito · Manny López	4:05
14.	"Boom, Boom"	Antonio Montoya · Poncho Abaldonato · Raphael Abaldonato · Antonie Santiago · Fevrier Fernández; Lyrics: Spanish: Estéfano	Estéfano	4:23
15.	"Dáme (Touch Me)" (with Jennifer López)	LaShawn Daniels · Fred Jenkins III · Rodney Jerkins; Lyrics: Spanish: Manny Benito · Estéfano	Rodney "Darkchild" Jerkins	4:25
Total length:				54:32

†Only available in the 2001 re-release of Simplemente.

© MM. Sony Music Entertainment Inc.

== Music videos ==
1. Yo Te Amo
2. Boom, Boom
3. Vivo
4. Candela
5. Ay Mamá

== Charts ==
Chart (2000–2002)	Peak position
Uruguay Albums Chart	5
U.S. Billboard Top Latin Albums	3
U.S. Billboard Latin Pop Albums	3
U.S. Billboard Heatseekers Albums	22

=== Year-end charts ===
Chart (2000)	Peak position
Spain (AFYVE)	31

Chart (2001)	Position
Spain (AFYVE)	46

== Sales and certifications ==
Region	Certification	Certified units/sales
Argentina (CAPIF)	2× Platinum	120,000^{^}
Chile (IFPI Chile)	3× Platinum	80,000
Mexico (AMPROFON)	Platinum+Gold	225,000^{‡}
Spain (Promusicae)	2× Platinum	200,000^{^}
United States (RIAA)	2× Platinum (Latin)	200,000^{^}
^{^} Shipments figures based on certification alone.^{‡} Sales+streaming figures based on certification alone.
