= Tiempo de Vals =

Studio album by Chayanne
- Released: August 7, 1990
- Recorded: 1989–1990
- Studio: Ameraycan Recording Studios; A&M Records (Los Angeles, California); Capitol Recording Studios; Ocean Way Recording Studios (Hollywood, California); Critiera Recording Studios (Miami, Florida); Musigrama; Eurosonic; Sonoland Studios (Madrid, Spain); Unique Recording Studios (New York, New York)
- Genre: Latin pop
- Length: 38:35
- Label: CBS Discos

Chayanne chronology
Chayanne (1988)	Tiempo de Vals (1990)	Provócame (1992)

Singles from Tiempo de Vals
- 1. "Completamente Enamorados" Released: 1990; 2. "Simon Sez" Released: 1990; 3. "Daría Cualquier Cosa" Released: 1990; 4. "Tiempo de Vals" Released: 1991; 5. "La Fuerza de Amar" Released: 1991; 6. "Soleil, Soleil" Released: 1991

Tiempo de Vals (English: Waltz Time) is the fifth studio album recorded by Puerto Rican performer Chayanne, It was released by CBS Discos on August 7, 1990 (see 1990 in music). The album was the third released on the Sony Music label, and featured successful singles four singles that reach on Billboard's Hot Latin Tracks chart: "Completamente Enamorados" (that peaked #1 on that chart for five weeks), "Daría Cualquier Cosa", "Simon Sez" (which was the first song by Chayanne ever recorded in English), and "Tiempo de Vals". The song "Soleil, Soleil", is a cover of the song by Scottish pop group Middle of the Road, but with Spanish lyrics. The album sold 1,000,000 copies worldwide.

The titular song "Tiempo de Vals" has become a staple as the opening dance for Quinceañera parties and wedding receptions in Latin America replacing earlier more traditional waltzes.

== Track listing ==
No.	Title	Writer(s)	Length
1.	"Completamente Enamorados"	E. Ramazzotti · A. Cogliati · P. Cassano · Adap: Luis G. Escolar	4:21
2.	"Daría Cualquier Cosa"	Luis G. Escolar · J. Seijas	3:24
3.	"Simon Sez"	K. García · H. Alamaguer	4:35
4.	"Soleil, Soleil"	F. Arbex · Adapt: R. Livi	3:14
5.	"Tiempo de Vals"	J. M. Cano	4:11
6.	"Dónde Vas"	Torcuato · C. Rabello · Adapt: R. Livi	5:25
7.	"La Fuerza de Amar"	C. Horsth · R. Baños · Adapt: Luis G. Escobar	4:51
8.	"Sueño Perdido"	M. Sullivan · P. Manadas · Adapt: R. Livi	3:43
9.	"No Pensar en Tí"	I. Canut · C. G. Berlanga	5:13
Total length:			38:35

== Music videos ==
1. Completamente Enamorados
2. Daría Cualquier Cosa
3. Simon Sez
4. Tiempo de Vals

== Charts ==
Chart (1990–1991)	Peak position
US Latin Pop Albums (Billboard)	2

== Certifications ==
Region	Certification	Certified units/sales
Mexico (AMPROFON)	Platinum+Gold	350,000^{‡}
^{‡} Sales+streaming figures based on certification alone.
