= Chayanne =

Puerto Rican singer (born 1968)

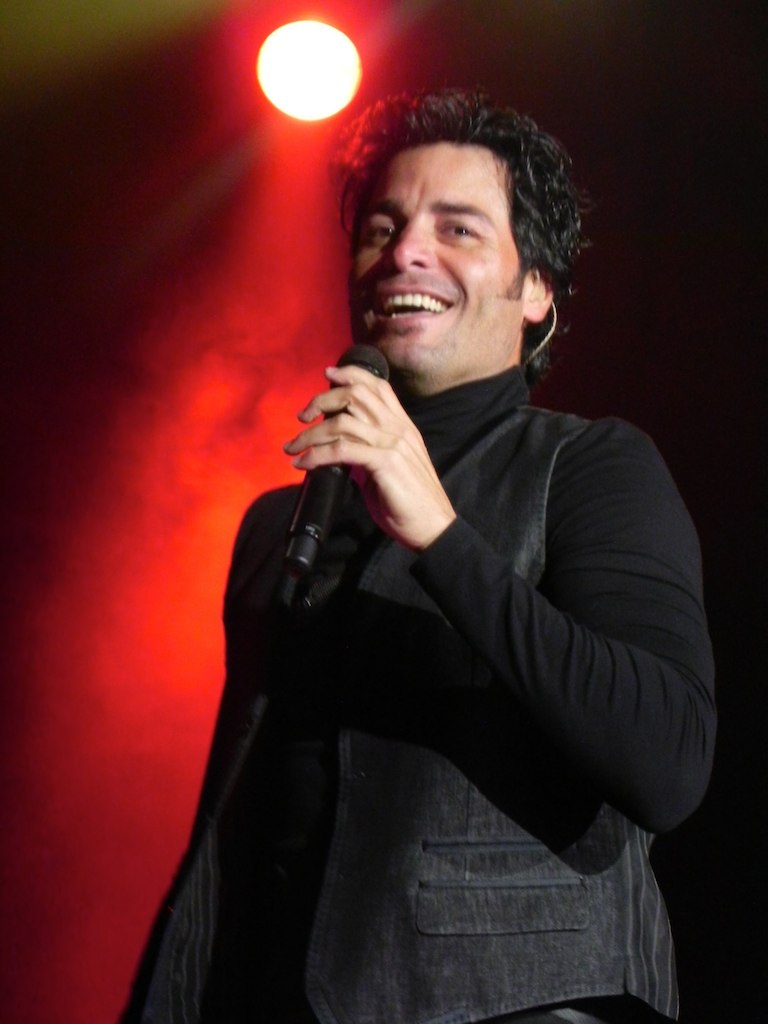
- Chayanne performing in Chicago, United States in 2010
- Born: Elmer Figueroa Arce; June 28, 1968 (age 58); Río Piedras, Puerto Rico
- Occupations: Singer; songwriter; actor
- Years active: 1978–present
- Works: Discography
- Relatives: Lele Pons (niece); Isadora Sofia Figueroa (daughter)
- Awards: Full list
- Musical career
- Origin: San Lorenzo, Puerto Rico
- Genres: Latin pop
- Labels: Sony; RCA
- Website: chayanne.com

Elmer Figueroa Arce (born June 28, 1968), known professionally as Chayanne, is a Puerto Rican singer and actor. He has released 21 albums and sold over 15 million records worldwide, making him one of the best-selling Latin music artists.

As an actor, Chayanne participated in two Puerto Rican telenovelas broadcast by the WAPA-TV television station in the 80s. These were Sombras del Pasado with Daniel Lugo and Alba Nydia Díaz, and Tormento with Lugo and Yazmin Pereira.

== Biography ==
=== Early life ===
Figueroa Arce's nickname "Chayanne" was given to him by his mother, in honor of his love for the 1950s American television series, Cheyenne.

=== Career with Los Chicos ===
In the late 1970s, he auditioned for famed Puerto Rican group Menudo, but the producers told him that he was too young to be a member. He joined another group, Los Chicos, and they produced several hit recordings, including "Puerto Rico Son Los Chicos" and "Ave Maria". Los Chicos toured all over Latin America and became a major rival to Menudo when Chayanne was a member.

=== Solo artist ===
After Los Chicos separated in 1984, Chayanne began his career as a solo artist. He signed with RCA Víctor and released his debut album, Es mi Nombre, that year. His second album with RCA Víctor, Sangre Latina, was released in 1986.

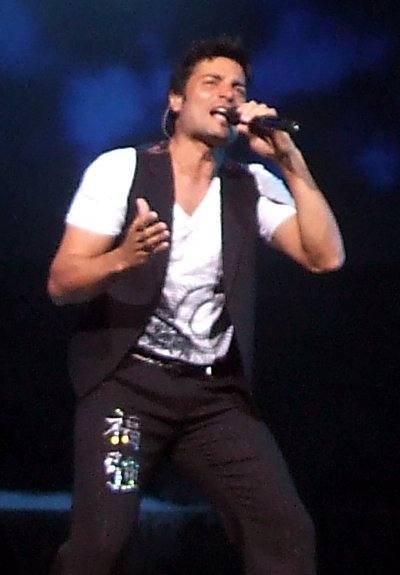
Chayanne during a concert in Managua, Nicaragua

After three years with RCA Víctor, Chayanne switched labels to Sony Music and broke out with his first self-titled album in 1987. This album featured a blend of ballads and dance tracks, a combination for which Chayanne would become famous. The album featured two hit songs, the ballad "Peligro de Amor", written by Michael Sullivan and Paulo Massadas, and a song that would cement him as an overall performer, the upbeat dance track "Fiesta en América", written by Honorio Herrero.

On 1 November 1988, Chayanne released his second self-titled album, Chayanne. This album featured several hit singles, including Herrero's "Tu Pirata Soy Yo", José María Cano's "Fuiste un Trozo de Hielo en la Escarcha", and "Este Ritmo Se Baila Así", composed by Pierre-Edouard Decimus and Jacob Desvarieux, both members of Guadeloupean band Kassav', and Roberto Livi. At the same time, Chayanne became a spokesperson for Pepsi, with the airing of the first Spanish-speaking advertising spot broadcast on U.S. national television, coast to coast, during the 1989 Grammy Awards telecast.

On August 7, 1990, he released the album Tiempo de Vals, featuring some of his best-selling singles, such as the title track (composed by José María Cano), "Completamente Enamorados" (by Piero Cassano, Adelio Cogliati, and Eros Ramazzotti), and "Daría Cualquier Cosa", composed by Luis Gómez-Escolar and Julio Seijas. Chayanne followed this with an album and title track that would eventually become his signature song, Provócame (1992). The album also featured the hit "El Centro de mi Corazón" (#1 U.S. Hot Latin, 1992), which was nominated for Pop Song of the Year at the Lo Nuestro Awards of 1993, while Chayanne was nominated for Best Male Pop Artist. Two years later, he released the covers album Influencias (1994), which was a tribute to some of his musical influences. In 1996, he released Volver a Nacer.

In 1998, he received his second Grammy nomination with the album Atado a Tu Amor, which featured his first number-one hit since 1992, "Dejaría Todo", as well as a long-lasting hit in the title track. The hot streak continued in 2000, when Chayanne released Simplemente and the top-ten hit "Candela" and the number-one hit "Yo Te Amo". On March 19, 2002, he released Grandes Éxitos, a greatest-hits album with a few new tracks. One of those new tracks, "Y Tú Te Vas", was the number-one song of the summer for 2002, and went on to be the theme song for Venezuelan telenovela Todo sobre Camila, produced by Venevisión. The following year, Chayanne released Sincero, which featured two number-one songs, "Un Siglo Sin Ti" and "Cuidarte el Alma".

In 2005, Chayanne embarked on a tour alongside Alejandro Fernández and Marc Anthony. That same year, he released two albums, a second compilation album, Desde Siempre, with the new song "Contra Vientos y Mareas", followed by Cautivo, with hits such as "No Sé Por Qué", "Te Echo de Menos" and "No Te Preocupes Por Mí".

Chayanne's 13th album, Mi Tiempo, was released on April 10, 2007. The album debuted at number two on the Billboard Latin Albums chart, selling 17,000 copies in its first week. The lead single off the album, "Si Nos Quedará Poco Tiempo", reached number-one on the Hot Latin Songs chart.

Following the album's release, Chayanne began an international tour to promote Mi Tiempo. Among the regions visited on the tour were México, Venezuela, Ecuador, Perú and the United States.

On August 24, 2008, he began a series of presentations in Spain. When interviewed, he noted that the concert would be fluid, "like a musical", and "more Latin" than his previous presentations, being composed of "more pop, Brazilian, Caribbean and reggae rhythms", which he would use to "dance constantly".

He gave a special performance at the Miss Universe 2003 pageant. On October 12, 2009, Chayanne released a new single titled "Me Enamoré de Ti", serving as the theme song for the 2009 soap opera Corazon Salvaje. This single is featured in Chayanne's 2010 release, No Hay Imposibles.

On March 14, 2015, Chayanne released a new single titled, "Tu respiración", serving as the theme song for the 2015 soap opera Lo imperdonable.

=== Acting career ===
In the 1980s, Chayanne participated in several soap operas and starred in the comedy series Generaciones with Luis Antonio Rivera. In 1994 he played himself in Volver a empezar along with Yuri. That same year, he also starred in Linda Sara opposite former Miss Universe, Dayanara Torres. The film was written and directed by famous Puerto Rican filmmaker Jacobo Morales. In 1998, he starred in his first Hollywood role, playing a Cuban dancer along with Vanessa L. Williams in Dance with Me. He also made a guest appearance on Ally McBeal. In the next few years he worked in other projects like the Argentine soap opera Provócame, for which he made the soundtrack of the same name.

In 2008, Chayanne played the title role (of a vampire) on the television series Gabriel: Amor Inmortal. To familiarize himself with the concept he adopted a different daily schedule, sleeping during the day and working at night. He noted that the production wanted to "make things look as real as possible", but that the adaptation process was difficult. The series debuted on September 28, 2008, on Mega TV.

He voiced Flynn Rider in Tangled (2010) for the Latin-American Spanish dubbing.

=== Personal life ===
He is married to Marilisa Maronesse and their children are son Lorenzo and daughter Isadora. The family lives in Miami Beach, Florida. Chayanne's daughter Isadora is a singer who was nominated in the 2025 Latin Grammy Awards Best New Artist category. He is the uncle of Venezuelan singer Lele Pons.

== Filmography ==
=== Films ===
Year	Title	Role	Notes
1994	Linda Sara	Young Alejandro	Debut film
1996	Al compás de un sentimiento	Singer	
1997	Siempre piel canela	Singer	Television film
1998	Dance with Me	Rafael Infante	
2000	Chayanne: Candela	Himself	Video short
2004	Por amor al arte	Himself	Television film
2006	Murcia, ¡qué hermosa eres!	Himself	Television film
2010	Tangled	Flynn Rider	Voice role, Latin-American Spanish dubbing
2012	Merry Christmas with Our People... Tony Bennett and Friends	Himself	Television film

=== Television ===
Year	Title	Role	Notes
1986	Pobre juventud	El Ruso	Television debut
1992	Nubeluz	Himself	Special guest
1994	Volver a empezar	Chayanne	Lead role
2001	Ally McBeal	Sam Adams	2 episodes
2001	Provócame	Pedro Balmaceda-Linares Duncán	
2003	Son amores	Chayanne	
2004	La niñera		
2006	Juan y José show		
2006	Sos mi vida	Himself	Episode 215
2008	Gabriel	Gabriel / Gabriel Marquez	Lead role; 10 episodes

=== Songs for television and movies ===
Year	Project	Song	Notes
1994	Linda Sara	"Sera"	
1994	Baila conmigo	"You Are My Home (Salsa)" "You Are My Home"	
1999	Girasoles para Lucía	"Atado a tu amor"	
2000	Pobre diabla	"Soy como un niño (Looking Through The Eyes Of A Child)"	
2001	Provócame	"Hasta que el alma resista"	
2003	Todo sobre Camila	"Y tú te vas"	
2004	La vida es una canción	"Peligro de amor"	1 episode
2005	El disco del año	"No te preocupes por mí"	
2005	Rocío, siempre	"Me ha dicho la luna"	
2007	La tele de tu vida	"Torero"	Season, Episode 15
2009	Corazón salvaje	"Me enamoré de ti"	
2009	Feroz	"Me enamoré de ti"	Episode: "Guillermo debe matar a Leo"; Episode: "Leo atacó a Guillermo"; Episode: "Leo supo que mató a Laura"
2014	Tu cara me suena	"Salomé"	
2014	Guapas	"Baila, baila"	Episode: "La máquina del tiempo"
2015	Lo imperdonable	"Tu respiración"	Main theme

== Discography ==
Studio albums

- Es mi nombre (1984)
- Sangre Latina (1986)
- Chayanne (1987)
- Chayanne (1988)
- Tiempo de Vals (1990)
- Provócame (1992)
- Influencias (1994)
- Volver a Nacer (1996)
- Atado a Tu Amor (1998)
- Simplemente (2000)
- Sincero (2003)
- Cautivo (2005)
- Mi tiempo (2007)
- No hay imposibles (2010)
- En Todo Estaré (2014)
- Bailemos Otra Vez (2023)

== See also ==
- List of awards and nominations received by Chayanne
- List of Puerto Ricans
- List of best-selling Latin music artists
