= Camila discography =

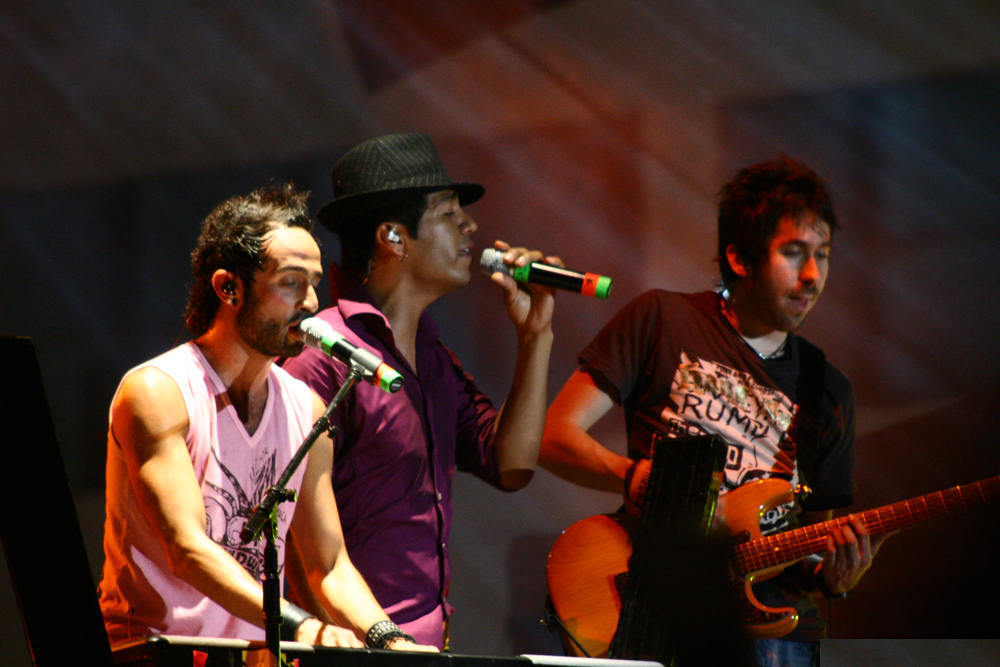
- From left to right: Domm, Samo, Hurtado performing in 2007.
- Studio albums: 4
- Singles: 18
- Music videos: 10

The discography of Camila, a Mexican pop-soft rock group, consists of two studio albums, eight singles and six music videos.

== Albums ==
=== Studio albums ===
Year	Title	Album details	Peak chart positions						Certifications (sales thresholds)	Sales
Year	Title	Album details	US	US Latin	US Latin Pop	ARG	MEX	SPA	Certifications (sales thresholds)	Sales
2006	Todo Cambió	Released: May 9, 2006; Label: Sony BMG; Format: CD, Digital download	76	1	1	15	2	—	Gold (ARG); Diamond (MEX); Platinum (Latin) (US)	1, 000, 000 (Worldwide); 300, 000 (MEX)
2010	Dejarte de Amar	Released: February 9, 2010; Label: Sony BMG; Format: CD, Digital download	64	1	1	8	1	27	2× Diamond+Platinum+Gold (MEX); Platinum (Latin) (US)	1, 500, 000 (Worldwide); 480, 000 (MEX)
2014	Elypse	Released: June 3, 2014; Label: Sony BMG; Format: CD, Digital download	152	5	3	3	3	17	2× Platinum (MEX)	60,000 (MEX)
2019	Hacia Adentro	Released: May 17, 2019; Label: Sony BMG; Format: CD, Digital download	—	—	—	—	—	—		
"—" denotes releases that did not chart or were not released.

=== Live albums ===
Year	Album Details	Peak Chart Position		
Year	Album Details	MEX	USA Latin	USA Latin Pop
2019	4 Latidos Tour (with Sin Bandera): Release: March 29, 2019; Label: Sony Music; Format: CD/DVD, Download	3	40	9

=== Compilation albums ===
Year	Album Details	Peak Chart Position	
Year	Album Details	USA Latin	USA Latin Pop
2016	Greatest Hits: Release: December 9, 2016; Label: Sony Music; Format: CD/DVD, Download	41	9

== Singles ==
List of singles, with selected chart positions
Title	Year	Peak chart positions					Certifications	Album
Title	Year	US LATIN	US LATIN Pop	US LATIN Tropical	SPA	MEX	Certifications	Album
"Abrázame"	2006	30	8	—	—	9	MEX: Platinum	Todo Cambió
"Coleccionista de Canciones"	2006	—	29	—	—	2	MEX: 4× Platinum	Todo Cambió
"Todo Cambió"	2007	9	3	33	—	1	MEX: 2× Diamond+2× Platinum+Gold	Todo Cambió
"Sólo Para Tí"	2007	18	4	—	—	2	MEX: 3× Platinum+Gold	Todo Cambió
"Yo Quiero"	2008	12	3	38	—	-	—	Todo Cambió
"Me Da Igual"	2008	27	9	—	—	-	—	Todo Cambió
"Mientes"	2009	4	1	21	11	1	MEX: 2× Diamond+Gold	Dejarte de Amar
"Aléjate de Mí"	2010	3	1	9	—	1	MEX: Diamond+2× Platinum	Dejarte de Amar
"Bésame"	2010	9	1	31	—	1	MEX: 4× Platinum	Dejarte de Amar
"De mí"	2011	18	3	—	—	1	MEX: Gold	Dejarte de Amar
"Entre Tus Alas"	2011	23	2	—	—	1	—	Dejarte de Amar
"De Que Me Sirve La Vida"	2012	24	7	—	—	1	MEX: 4× Platinum	Dejarte de Amar
"Decidiste dejarme"	2014	14	2	—	—	3	MEX: 2× Platinum+Gold	Elypse
"Perdón" (featuring Ricky Martin)	2014	—	—	—	—	—	—	Elypse
"De Venus"	2014	—	—	—	—	—	—	Elypse
"F**king Famous"	2015	—	—	—	—	—	—	Non-album single
"Cianuro y Miel"	2018	—	—	—	—	—	—	Hacia Adentro
"Te Confieso"	2019	—	—	—	—	—	MEX: Platinum+Gold	Hacia Adentro
"Sobreviviendo"	2019	—	—	—	—	—	—	Hacia Adentro
"Energía"	2019	—	—	—	—	—	—	Hacia Adentro

=== As featured artist ===
List of singles, with selected chart positions
Title	Year	Album
"Resistiré México" (among Artists for Mexico)	2020	Non-album single
"—" denotes a title that did not chart.

== Music videos ==
List of music videos, showing year released and director
Title	Year	Director(s)
"Abrázame"	2006	Ricardo Calderón
"Coleccionista de Canciones"	2006	Alexis Cerdio Gusino
"Todo Cambió"	2007	Ricardo Calderón
"Sólo Para Tí"	2007	Alexis Cerdio Gusino
"Mientes"	2009	Ricardo Calderón
"Aléjate de Mí"	2010	Ricardo Calderón
"De Mí"	2011	Pedro Torres
"De Que Me Sirve La Vida"	2012	Gustavo Garzón
"Decidiste dejarme"	2014	Jeff Nicholas and Jonathan Craven
"Perdón"	2014	Paul Brown
