= List of Billboard Mexico Airplay number ones =

Weekly record chart by Billboard magazine

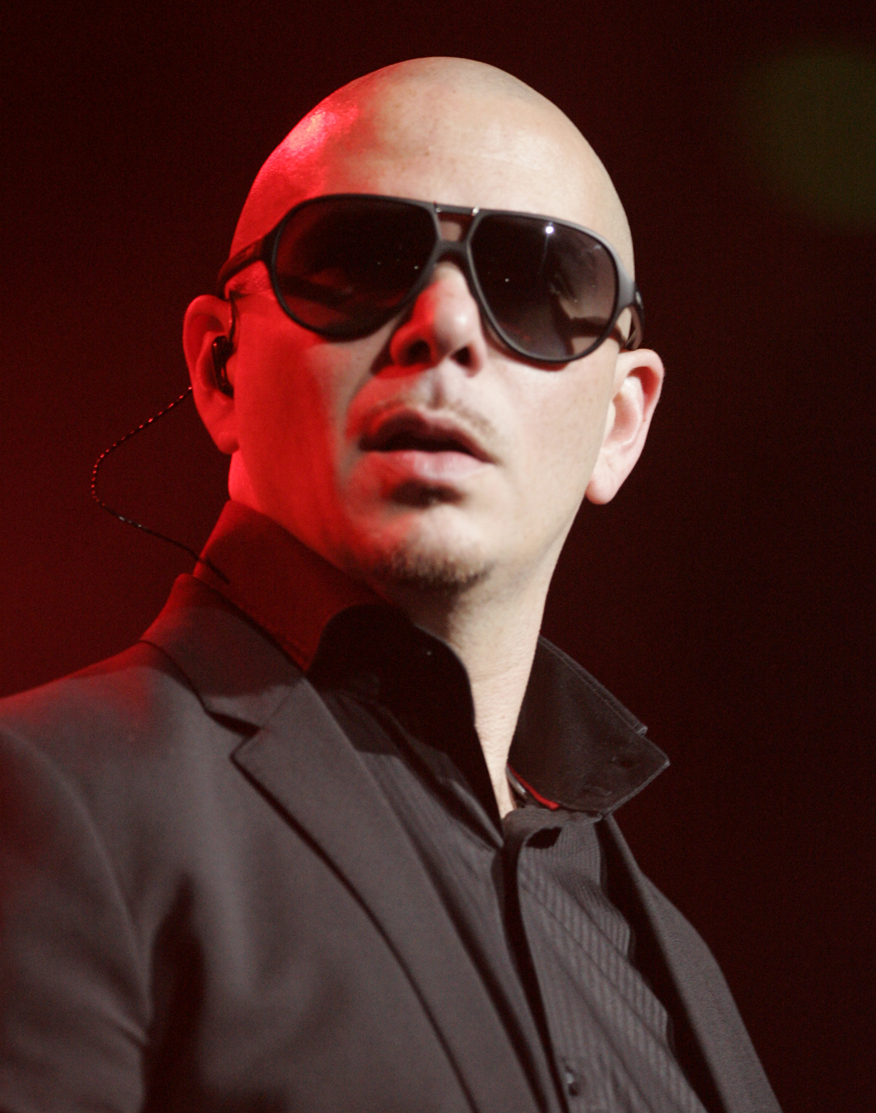
American rapper Pitbull (pictured in 2012), had the first number-one song in the chart.

Mexico Airplay was a weekly record chart published by Billboard magazine since 2011 for singles receiving airplay in Mexico. According to Billboard's electronic database, the first chart was published on January 17, 2009. In 2011, "Give Me Everything" by Cuban-American rapper Pitbull featuring Ne-Yo, Afrojack and Nayer, reached number one. The track also peaked at the top of the American Billboard Hot 100. The same year, American performers Maroon 5 featuring Christina Aguilera also peaked at number one in Mexico and in the United States with "Moves like Jagger". In 2012, Mexican band Jesse & Joy peaked at number one on this chart and the Mexican Espanol Airplay with the song "¡Corre!" that also won the Latin Grammy Awards for Record of the Year and Song of the Year in 2012.

Two songs performed by Barbadian singer Rihanna reached number-one, "We Found Love" and "Where Have You Been", the former also was a number-one song in the Billboard Hot 100 and its music video won the MTV Video Music Award for Video of the Year, while the latter was nominated for a Grammy Award for Best Pop Solo Performance. "Bailando" by Spanish singer-songwriter Enrique Iglesias reached number-one on the Mexico Airplay, Mexican Espanol Airplay, and the Billboard Latin Songs chart in the United States, where it spent 41 consecutive weeks at the top and won the Latin Grammy Award for Song of the Year. In 2015, "Lean On" by American electronic duo Major Lazer and DJ Snake featuring MØ peaked at number-one on the chart and was named by Spotify as the most streamed song of all time, with 526 million streams globally. By 2022, Colombian artist Maluma is the performer with the most number-one singles on the Mexico Airplay chart, with 16 chart toppers.

== Number ones ==
Key
No.	nth song to top the Mexico Airplay Chart
re	Return of a song to number one

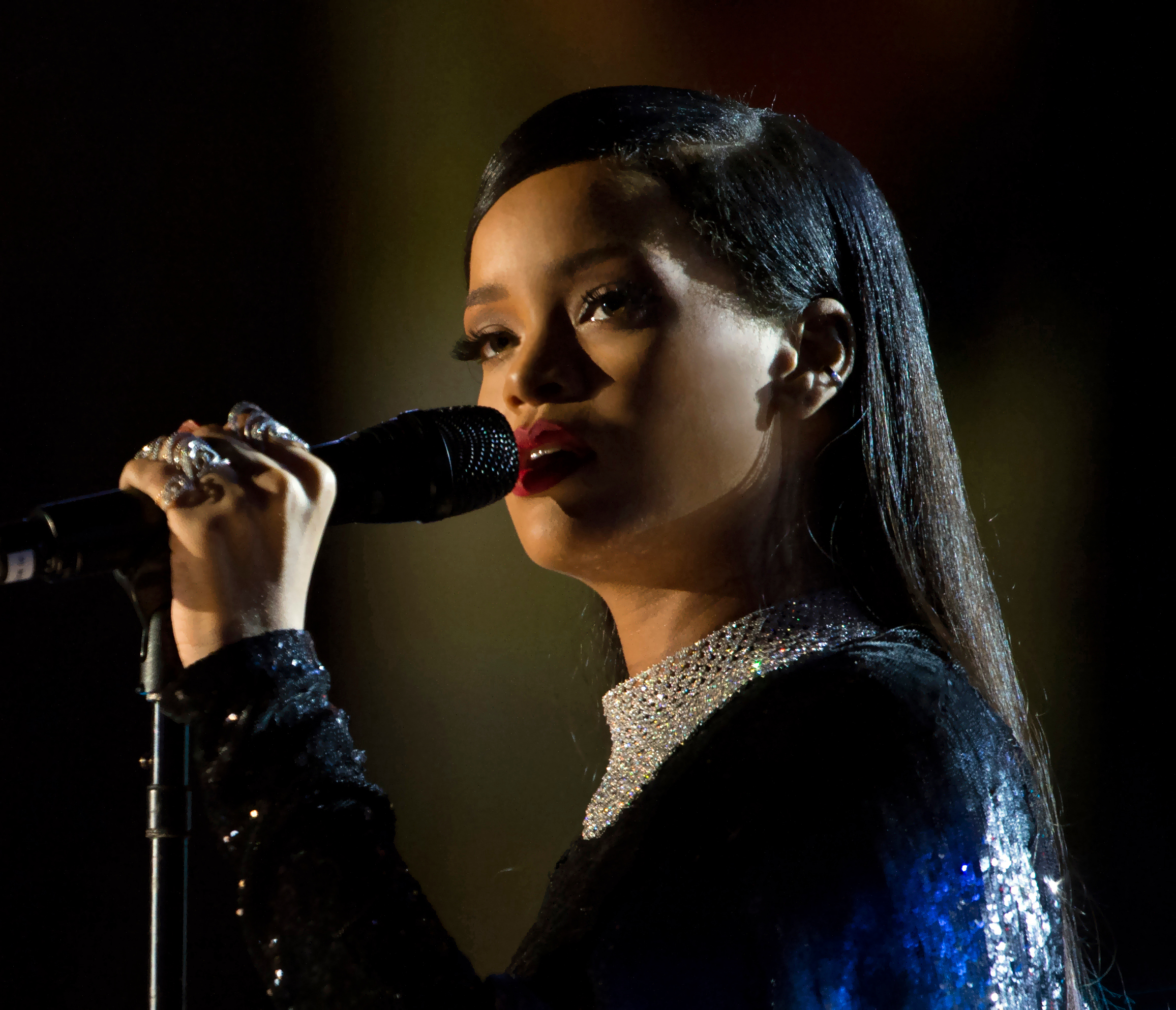
Barbadian singer Rihanna (pictured in 2014), has reached number-one twice.

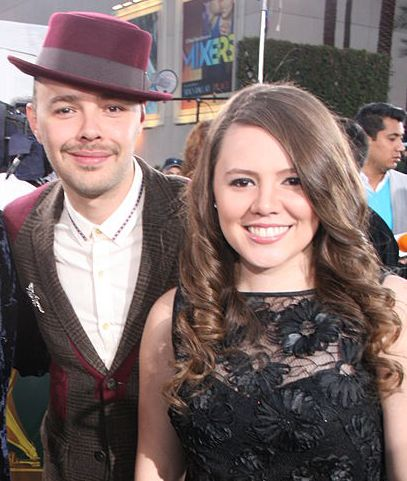
Mexican duo Jesse & Joy (pictured in 2012), has reached number-one five times.

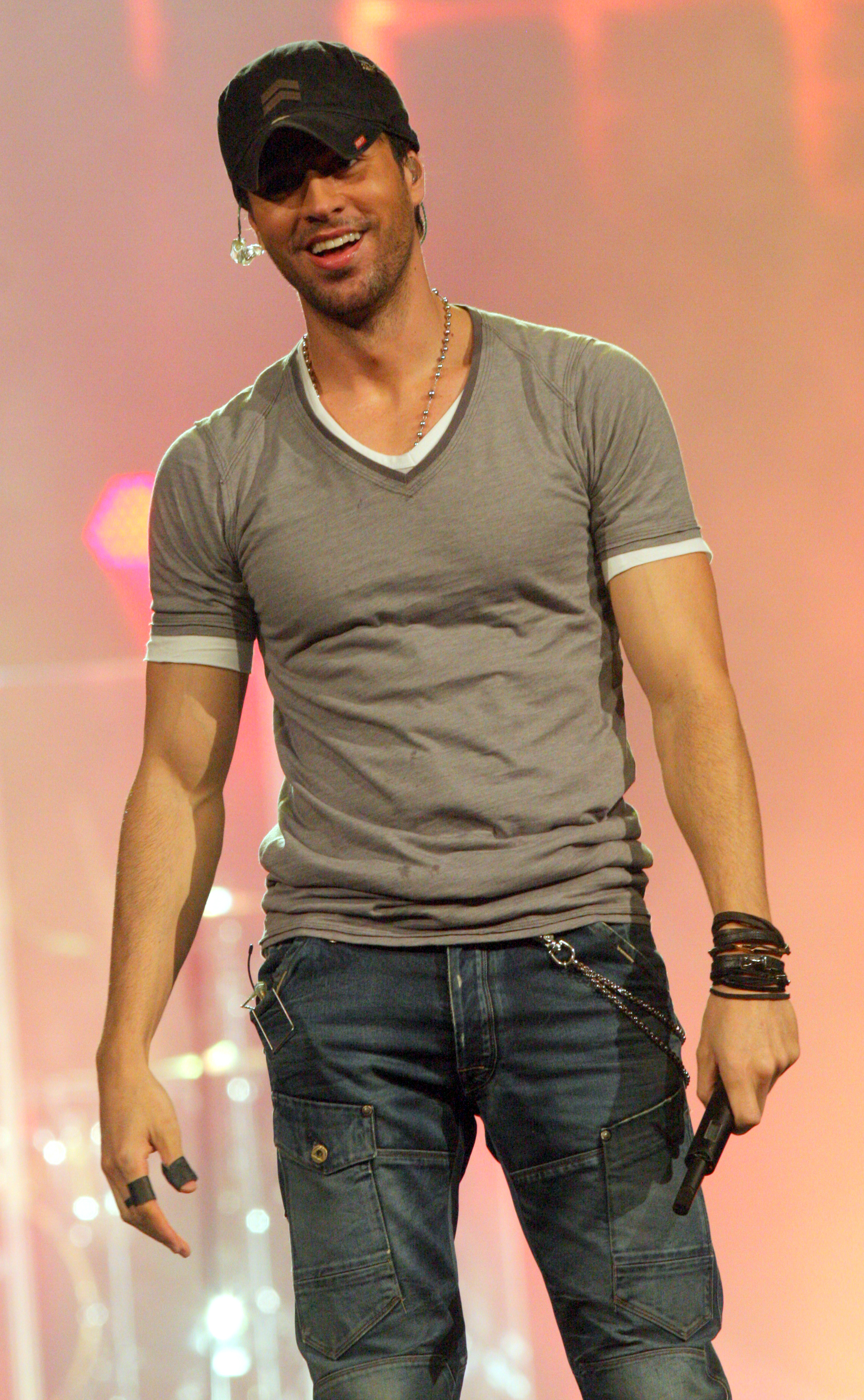
Spanish singer-songwriter Enrique Iglesias (pictured in 2011), peaked at number-one seven times.

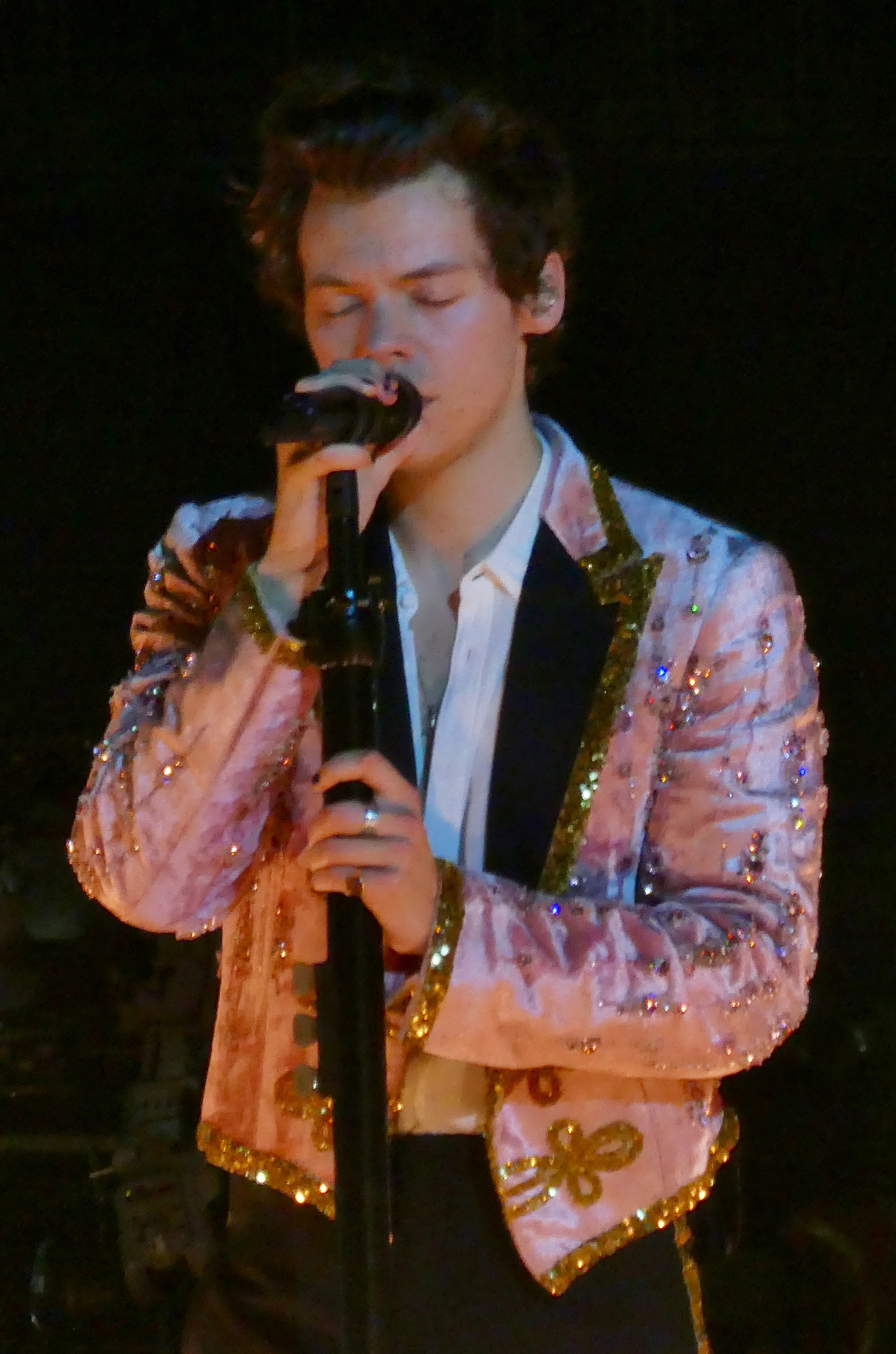
English performer Harry Styles (pictured in 2018), debuted at number-one with "As It Was" in 2022.

No.	Artist	Single	Reached number one	Weeks at number one	Ref.
2009
1	Ha*Ash	"Lo Que Yo Sé de Ti"	January 17, 2009	4	
2	Kalimba	"Se Te Olvidó"	February 14, 2009	3	
3	Paty Cantú	"Déjame Ir"	March 7, 2009	1	
4	La 5ª Estación	"Que te Quería"	March 14, 2009	1	
5	Gloria Trevi	"El Favor de la Soledad"	March 21, 2009	6	
6	La Oreja de Van Gogh	"Jueves"	May 2, 2009	1	
7	Yahir	"Viviré"	May 9, 2009	1	
re	La 5ª Estación	"Que te Quería"	May 16, 2009	2	
re	Yahir	"Viviré"	May 30, 2009	1	
8	Lady Gaga	"Poker Face"	June 6, 2009	1	
9	Paulina Rubio	"Causa y Efecto"	June 27, 2009	5	
re	Lady Gaga	"Poker Face"	July 18, 2009	1	
re	Paulina Rubio	"Causa y Efecto"	July 25, 2009	2	
10	Shakira	"Loba"	August 8, 2009	9	
11	Alejandro Sanz featuring Alicia Keys	"Looking for Paradise"	October 10, 2009	1	
re	Shakira	"Loba"	October 17, 2009	1	
re	Alejandro Sanz featuring Alicia Keys	"Looking for Paradise"	October 24, 2009	6	
12	Alejandro Fernández	"Se Me Va la Voz"	December 5, 2009	4	
2010
13	Carlos Baute featuring Marta Sánchez	"Colgado en Tus Manos"	January 2, 2010	2	
re	Alejandro Fernández	"Se Me Va la Voz"	January 16, 2010	2	
re	Carlos Baute featuring Marta Sánchez	"Colgado en Tus Manos"	January 30, 2010	1	
14	Camila	"Mientes"	February 6, 2010	6	
15	Alejandro Sanz	"Desde Cuándo"	March 20, 2010	1	
re	Camila	"Mientes"	March 27, 2010	1	
re	Alejandro Sanz	"Desde Cuándo"	April 3, 2010	1	
re	Camila	"Mientes"	April 10, 2010	1	
re	Alejandro Sanz	"Desde Cuándo"	April 17, 2010	2	
re	Camila	"Mientes"	May 1, 2010	1	
16	Shakira	"Gitana"	May 8, 2010	3	
17	Camila	"Aléjate de Mí"	May 29, 2010	1	
18	Aventura	"Dile al Amor"	June 5, 2010	8	
19	Enrique Iglesias featuring Juan Luis Guerra	"Cuando Me Enamoro"	July 31, 2010	3	
20	Luis Miguel	"Labios de Miel"	August 21, 2010	1	
re	Camila	"Aléjate de Mí"	September 11, 2010	1	
re	Enrique Iglesias featuring Juan Luis Guerra	"Cuando Me Enamoro"	August 28, 2010	2	
re	Camila	"Aléjate de Mí"	September 11, 2010	2	
re	Luis Miguel	"Labios de Miel"	September 25, 2010	1	
21	Aventura	"El Malo"	October 2, 2010	5	
re	Enrique Iglesias featuring Juan Luis Guerra	"Cuando Me Enamoro"	November 6, 2010	1	
22	Camila	"Bésame"	November 13, 2010	8	
2011
23	The Black Eyed Peas	"The Time (Dirty Bit)"	January 8, 2011	1	
re	Camila	"Bésame"	January 15, 2011	2	
re	The Black Eyed Peas	"The Time (Dirty Bit)"	January 29, 2011	9	
24	Maná	"Lluvia al Corazón"	April 2, 2011	1	
25	Lady Gaga	"Born This Way"	April 9, 2011	1	
26	Camila	"Entre Tus Alas"	April 16, 2011	1	
re	Maná	"Lluvia al Corazón"	April 23, 2011	2	
27	Alejandra Guzmán	"Día de Suerte"	May 7, 2011	2	
re	Maná	"Lluvia al Corazón"	May 21, 2011	4	
28	Los Tigres del Norte featuring Paulina Rubio	"Golpes en el Corazón"	June 18, 2011	7	
29	Martin Solveig & Dragonette	"Hello"	August 6, 2011	1	
re	Los Tigres del Norte featuring Paulina Rubio	"Golpes en el Corazón"	August 13, 2011	4	
30	Pitbull featuring Ne-Yo, Afrojack and Nayer	"Give Me Everything"	September 10, 2011	2	
31	Maná	"Amor Clandestino"	September 24, 2011	1	
re	Pitbull featuring Ne-Yo, Afrojack and Nayer	"Give Me Everything"	October 1, 2011	1	
31	Maná	"Amor Clandestino"	October 8, 2011	1	
re	Pitbull featuring Ne-Yo, Afrojack and Nayer	"Give Me Everything"	October 15, 2011	1	
32	Camila	"De Mi"	October 22, 2011	1	
33	Ha*Ash	"Te Dejo en Libertad"	October 29, 2011	2	
34	Maroon 5 featuring Christina Aguilera	"Moves like Jagger"	November 12, 2011	8	
2012
35	Maná featuring Prince Royce	"El Verdadero Amor Perdona"	January 7, 2012	1	
re	Maroon 5 featuring Christina Aguilera	"Moves like Jagger"	January 14, 2012	1	
36	Jesse & Joy	"¡Corre!"	January 21, 2012	1	
37	Foster the People	"Pumped Up Kicks"	January 28, 2012	1	
re	Jesse & Joy	"¡Corre!"	February 4, 2012	1	
38	Rihanna featuring Calvin Harris	"We Found Love"	February 11, 2012	3	
re	Jesse & Joy	"¡Corre!"	March 3, 2012	1	
re	Rihanna featuring Calvin Harris	"We Found Love"	March 10, 2012	1	
re	Jesse & Joy	"¡Corre!"	March 17, 2012	1	
re	Rihanna featuring Calvin Harris	"We Found Love"	March 24, 2012	3	
39	Camila	"De Qué Me Sirve la Vida"	April 14, 2012	1	
re	Rihanna featuring Calvin Harris	"We Found Love"	April 21, 2012	2	
40	Jesse & Joy	"La de la Mala Suerte"	May 5, 2012	4	
41	Espinoza Paz	"Un Hombre Normal"	June 2, 2012	1	
re	Jesse & Joy	"La de la Mala Suerte"	June 9, 2012	1	
42	One Direction	"What Makes You Beautiful"	June 16, 2012	2	
43	Maná	"Mi Reina del Dolor"	June 30, 2012	1	
44	fun. featuring Janelle Monáe	"We Are Young"	July 7, 2012	4	
45	Rihanna	"Where Have You Been"	August 4, 2012	1	
46	Miguel Bosé featuring Ximena Sariñana	"Aire Soy"	August 11, 2012	3	
re	Rihanna	"Where Have You Been"	September 1, 2012	3	
re	Miguel Bosé featuring Ximena Sariñana	"Aire Soy"	September 22, 2012	3	
47	Psy	"Gangnam Style"	October 13, 2012	9	
48	Jesse & Joy	"¿Con Quién Se Queda El Perro?"	December 8, 2012	1	
49	Thalía	"Manías"	December 15, 2012	3	
2013
50	Pitbull featuring TJR	"Don't Stop the Party"	January 5, 2013	1	
re	Psy	"Gangnam Style"	January 12, 2013	2	
51	Bruno Mars	"Locked Out of Heaven"	January 26, 2013	5	
52	Swedish House Mafia featuring John Martin	"Don't You Worry Child"	March 2, 2013	1	
53	Jesse & Joy featuring Mario Domm	"Llorar"	March 9, 2013	1	
re	Bruno Mars	"Locked Out of Heaven"	March 16, 2013	2	
54	Calvin Harris featuring Florence Welch	"Sweet Nothing"	March 30, 2013	1	
re	Bruno Mars	"Locked Out of Heaven"	April 6, 2013	3	
55	Pitbull featuring Christina Aguilera	"Feel This Moment"	April 27, 2013	1	
56	Banda Sinaloense MS de Sergio Lizárraga	"Mi Razón de Ser"	May 4, 2013	4	
57	Daft Punk featuring Pharrell Williams	"Get Lucky"	June 1, 2013	9	
58	La Arrolladora Banda el Limón de René Camacho	"El Ruido de Tus Zapatos"	August 3, 2013	4	
59	Robin Thicke featuring T.I. and Pharrell Williams	"Blurred Lines"	August 31, 2013	1	
60	Romeo Santos	"Propuesta Indecente"	September 7, 2013	4	
61	Avicii	"Wake Me Up!"	October 5, 2013	1	
62	Katy Perry	"Roar"	October 12, 2013	2	
re	Avicii	"Wake Me Up!"	October 26, 2013	1	
63	Prince Royce	"Darte un Beso"	November 2, 2013	5	
64	Marco Antonio Solís	"Tres Semanas"	December 7, 2013	3	
65	Alejandra Guzmán	"Mi Peor Error"	December 28, 2013	1	
2014
66	Banda Sinaloense MS de Sergio Lizárraga	"Hermosa Experiencia"	January 4, 2014	2	
67	One Direction	"Story of My Life"	January 18, 2014	2	
68	Pitbull featuring Ke$ha	"Timber"	February 1, 2014	1	
69	OneRepublic	"Counting Stars"	February 8, 2014	5	
70	Shakira featuring Rihanna	"Can't Remember to Forget You"	March 15, 2014	1	
re	OneRepublic	"Counting Stars"	March 22, 2014	1	
71	Pharrell Williams	"Happy"	March 29, 2014	7	
72	Banda El Recodo de Cruz Lizárraga	"Consecuencia de Mis Actos"	May 17, 2014	1	
73	American Authors	"Best Day of My Life"	May 24, 2014	1	
re	Pharrell Williams	"Happy"	May 31, 2014	1	
74	Camila	"Decidiste Dejarme"	June 7, 2014	2	
75	Enrique Iglesias featuring Descemer Bueno and Gente de Zona	"Bailando"	June 21, 2014	1	
re	Camila	"Decidiste Dejarme"	June 28, 2014	1	
re	Enrique Iglesias featuring Descemer Bueno and Gente de Zona	"Bailando"	June 28, 2014	13	
76	Magic!	"Rude"	September 20, 2014	4	
77	Lilly Wood and the Prick and Robin Schulz	"Prayer in C"	October 10, 2014	1	
78	Meghan Trainor	"All About That Bass"	October 25, 2014	2	
79	Taylor Swift	"Shake It Off"	November 8, 2014	1	
80	Calvin Harris featuring John Newman	"Blame"	November 15, 2014	1	
re	Taylor Swift	"Shake It Off"	November 22, 2014	1	
re	Meghan Trainor	"All About That Bass"	November 29, 2014	1	
re	Calvin Harris featuring John Newman	"Blame"	December 6, 2014	1	
re	Taylor Swift	"Shake It Off"	December 13, 2014	1	
re	Calvin Harris featuring John Newman	"Blame"	December 20, 2014	1	
81	Banda Sinaloense MS de Sergio Lizárraga	"Háblame de Ti"	December 27, 2014	1	
2015
re	Calvin Harris featuring John Newman	"Blame"	January 3, 2015	1	
82	Mark Ronson featuring Bruno Mars	"Uptown Funk"	January 10, 2015	1	
re	Calvin Harris featuring John Newman	"Blame"	January 17, 2015	1	
re	Mark Ronson featuring Bruno Mars	"Uptown Funk"	January 24, 2015	9	
83	Maroon 5	"Sugar"	March 28, 2015	3	
84	Nicky Jam and Enrique Iglesias	"El Perdón"	April 18, 2015	1	
re	Mark Ronson featuring Bruno Mars	"Uptown Funk"	April 25, 2015	1	
re	Maroon 5	"Sugar"	May 2, 2015	1	
85	Banda Sinaloense MS de Sergio Lizárraga	"A Lo Mejor"	May 9, 2015	1	
re	Nicky Jam and Enrique Iglesias	"El Perdón"	May 16, 2015	1	
86	Wiz Khalifa featuring Charlie Puth	"See You Again"	May 23, 2015	1	
87	La Adictiva Banda San Jose de Mesillas	"Después de Ti ¿Quién?"	May 30, 2015	1	
re	Nicky Jam and Enrique Iglesias	"El Perdón"	June 6, 2015	1	
re	Wiz Khalifa featuring Charlie Puth	"See You Again"	June 13, 2015	1	
88	Calibre 50	"Aunque Ahora Estés Con Él"	June 20, 2015	1	
re	Wiz Khalifa featuring Charlie Puth	"See You Again"	June 27, 2015	2	
89	Gerardo Ortíz	"¿Por Qué Terminamos?"	July 11, 2015	1	
90	Major Lazer and DJ Snake featuring MØ	"Lean On"	July 18, 2015	1	
re	Calibre 50	"Aunque Ahora Estés Con Él"	July 25, 2015	2	
re	Major Lazer and DJ Snake featuring MØ	"Lean On"	August 8, 2015	1	
91	Fifth Harmony featuring Kid Ink	"Worth It"	August 15, 2015	1	
re	Gerardo Ortíz	"¿Por Qué Terminamos?"	August 22, 2015	1	
re	Calibre 50	"Aunque Ahora Estés Con Él"	August 29, 2015	1	
re	Major Lazer and DJ Snake featuring MØ	"Lean On"	September 5, 2015	1	
92	The Weeknd	"Can't Feel My Face"	September 12, 2015	1	
93	J Balvin	"Ginza"	September 19, 2015	6	
94	Calvin Harris and Disciples	"How Deep Is Your Love"	October 31, 2015	3	
re	J Balvin	"Ginza"	November 21, 2015	2	
95	R. City featuring Adam Levine	"Locked Away"	December 5, 2015	2	
96	Adele	"Hello"	December 19, 2015	2	
2016
97	Justin Bieber	"Sorry"	January 2, 2016	2	
re	R. City featuring Adam Levine	"Locked Away"	January 16, 2016	1	
98	Banda Sinaloense MS de Sergio Lizárraga	”Solo Con Verte"	January 23, 2016	1	
99	Coldplay	"Adventure of a Lifetime"	January 30, 2016	1	
100	Sin Bandera	"En Esta No"	February 6, 2016	1	
re	Coldplay	"Adventure of a Lifetime"	February 13, 2016	5	
101	twenty one pilots	"Stressed Out"	March 19, 2016	5	
102	Maluma	"El Perdedor"	April 23, 2016	2	
103	Enrique Iglesias featuring Wisin	"Duele el Corazón"	May 7, 2016	1	
104	Joey Montana	"Picky" (Note: Starting from the Week of May 28, 2016, the version included in the chart is the one featuring Akon & Mohombi.)	May 14, 2016	4	
105	J Balvin	"Bobo"	June 11, 2016	3	
106	Justin Timberlake	"Can't Stop the Feeling!"	July 2, 2016	5	
107	Calvin Harris featuring Rihanna	"This Is What You Came For"	August 6, 2016	1	
108	Kungs vs Cookin' on 3 Burners	"This Girl"	August 13, 2016	6	
109	DJ Snake featuring Justin Bieber	"Let Me Love You"	September 24, 2016	1	
110	Carlos Vives featuring Shakira	"La Bicicleta"	October 1, 2016	1	
re	DJ Snake featuring Justin Bieber	"Let Me Love You"	October 8, 2016	2	
111	Martin Garrix & Bebe Rexha	"In The Name of Love"	October 22, 2016	1	
re	DJ Snake featuring Justin Bieber	"Let Me Love You"	October 29, 2016	1	
112	Sia featuring Kendrick Lamar	"The Greatest"	November 5, 2016	2	
113	J Balvin featuring Pharrell Williams, BIA and Sky	"Safari"	November 19, 2016	1	
114	Ricky Martin featuring Maluma	"Vente Pa' Ca"	November 26, 2016	1	
115	Calvin Harris	"My Way"	December 3, 2016	1	
re	Ricky Martin featuring Maluma	"Vente Pa' Ca"	December 10, 2016	1	
re	J Balvin featuring Pharrell Williams, BIA and Sky	"Safari"	December 17, 2016	1	
116	Clean Bandit featuring Sean Paul and Anne-Marie	"Rockabye"	December 24, 2016	7	
2017
117	Alok and Bruno Martino featuring Zeeba	"Hear Me Now"	February 11, 2017	1	
118	Calibre 50	"Siempre Te Voy a Querer"	February 18, 2017	1	
re	Clean Bandit featuring Sean Paul and Anne-Marie	"Rockabye"	February 25, 2017	1	
119	CNCO	"Reggaetón Lento (Bailemos)"	March 4, 2017	1	
120	Luis Fonsi featuring Daddy Yankee	"Despacito"	March 11, 2017	2	
121	Christian Nodal	"Adios Amor"	March 25, 2017	1	
re	Calibre 50	"Siempre Te Voy a Querer"	April 1, 2017	1	
re	Christian Nodal	"Adios Amor"	April 8, 2017	2	
re	Luis Fonsi featuring Daddy Yankee	"Despacito"	April 22, 2017	1	
122	Enrique Iglesias featuring Descemer Bueno and Zion & Lennox	"Súbeme La Radio"	April 29, 2017	1	
re	Luis Fonsi & Daddy Yankee featuring Justin Bieber	"Despacito"	May 6, 2017	10	
123	Maluma	"Felices los 4"	July 15, 2017	1	
re	Luis Fonsi & Daddy Yankee featuring Justin Bieber	"Despacito"	July 22, 2017	1	
re	Maluma	"Felices los 4"	July 29, 2017	4	
124	J Balvin & Willy William featuring Beyoncé	"Mi Gente" (Note: Starting from the Week of October 14, 2017 (the 8th week at number-one), the version included in the chart is the one featuring Beyoncé.)	August 26, 2017	10	
125	Shakira featuring Nicky Jam	"Perro Fiel"	November 4, 2017	2	
126	Banda Sinaloense MS de Sergio Lizárraga	"El Color de Tus Ojos"	November 18, 2017	1	
re	Shakira featuring Nicky Jam	"Perro Fiel"	November 25, 2017	2	
127	Calibre 50	"Corrido de Juanito"	December 9, 2017	1	
128	Camila Cabello featuring Young Thug	"Havana"	December 16, 2017	2	
129	Maluma X Nego do Borel	"Corazón"	December 30, 2017	5	
2018
130	Luis Fonsi & Demi Lovato	"Échame la Culpa"	January 27, 2018	6	
131	Enrique Iglesias featuring Bad Bunny	"El Baño"	March 10, 2018	1	
132	Jax Jones featuring Ina Wroldsen	"Breathe"	March 17, 2018	1	
133	Reik featuring Ozuna & Wisin	"Me Niego"	March 24, 2018	5	
134	Maluma	"El Préstamo"	April 28, 2018	5	
re	Reik featuring Ozuna & Wisin	"Me Niego"	June 2, 2018	1	
135	Calvin Harris & Dua Lipa	"One Kiss"	June 9, 2018	1	
re	Reik featuring Ozuna & Wisin	"Me Niego"	June 16, 2018	1	
re	Calvin Harris & Dua Lipa	"One Kiss"	June 23, 2018	8	
136	Thalía & Natti Natasha	"No Me Acuerdo"	August 18, 2018	1	
137	Shakira & Maluma	“Clandestino”	August 25, 2018	4	
138	Reik & Maluma	“Amigos con Derechos”	September 22, 2018	4	
139	Calvin Harris & Sam Smith	"Promises"	October 20, 2018	1	
140	Dynoro & Gigi D'Agostino	"In My Mind"	October 27, 2018	1	
re	Reik & Maluma	“Amigos con Derechos”	November 3, 2018	2	
141	CNCO	"Se Vuelve Loca"	November 17, 2018	1	
142	Marshmello & Bastille	"Happier"	November 24, 2018	1	
re	Dynoro & Gigi D'Agostino	"In My Mind"	December 1, 2018	2	
re	Calvin Harris & Sam Smith	"Promises"	December 15, 2018	1	
143	Christian Nodal	"No Te Contaron Mal"	December 22, 2018	1	
144	Janet Jackson & Daddy Yankee	"Made for Now"	December 29, 2018	3	
2019
145	Ariana Grande	"Thank U, Next"	January 19, 2019	2	
146	Post Malone & Swae Lee	"Sunflower (Spider-Man: Into The Spider-Verse)"	February 2, 2019	2	
147	Pedro Capó X Farruko	"Calma" (Remix)	February 16, 2019	1	
re	Post Malone & Swae Lee	"Sunflower (Spider-Man: Into The Spider-Verse)"	February 23, 2019	1	
148	Sam Smith & Normani	"Dancing with a Stranger"	March 2, 2019	2	
149	Juanes featuring Lalo Ebratt	"La Plata"	March 16, 2019	1	
150	J Balvin	"Reggaetón"	March 23, 2019	2	
151	Daddy Yankee featuring Snow	"Con Calma"	April 6, 2019	1	
152	Maluma	"HP"	April 13, 2019	1	
re	Daddy Yankee featuring Snow	"Con Calma"	April 20, 2019	1	
153	BTS featuring Halsey	"Boy with Luv"	April 27, 2019	1	
re	Daddy Yankee & Katy Perry featuring Snow	"Con Calma"	May 4, 2019	2	
re	BTS featuring Halsey	"Boy with Luv"	May 18, 2019	1	
154	Taylor Swift featuring Brendon Urie	"ME!"	May 25, 2019	1	
155	Jesse & Joy featuring J Balvin	"Mañana es Too Late"	June 1, 2019	1	
156	Ed Sheeran & Justin Bieber	"I Don't Care"	June 8, 2019	3	
157	Rosalía, J Balvin, and El Guincho	"Con Altura"	June 29, 2019	1	
158	Maluma	"11 PM"	July 6, 2019	3	
159	Los Ángeles Azules, Belinda & Lalo Ebratt featuring Horacio Palencia	"Amor a Primera Vista"	July 27, 2019	11	
160	Anuel AA, Daddy Yankee and Karol G featuring Ozuna and J Balvin	"China"	October 12, 2019	2	
161	Maluma featuring Ricky Martin	"No Se Me Quita"	October 26, 2019	1	
162	J Balvin & Bad Bunny	"La Canción"	November 2, 2019	2	
163	Camilo + Pedro Capó	"Tutu"	November 16, 2019	1	
164	Alejandro Fernández	"Caballero"	November 23, 2019	2	
165	Ozuna	"Hasta Que Salga el Sol"	December 7, 2019	1	
166	Tones and I	"Dance Monkey"	December 14, 2019	4	
2020
167	Post Malone	"Circles"	January 11, 2020	1	
re	Tones and I	"Dance Monkey"	January 18, 2020	6	
168	Juanes & Christian Nodal	"Tequila"	February 29, 2020	1	
169	The Weeknd	"Blinding Lights"	March 7, 2020	1	
170	Alejandro Fernández	"Te Olvidé"	March 14, 2020	1	
171	Ozuna	"Fantasía"	March 21, 2020	1	
172	Carlos Rivera, Becky G and Pedro Capó	"Perdiendo la Cabeza"	March 28, 2020	1	
173	J Balvin	"Morado"	April 4, 2020	2	
174	Doja Cat	"Say So"	April 18, 2020	3	
re	The Weeknd	"Blinding Lights"	May 9, 2020	2	
re	Doja Cat	"Say So"	May 23, 2020	3	
175	Maluma	"AMDV"	June 13, 2020	1	
176	Raymix and Paulina Rubio	"Tú y Yo"	June 20, 2020	1	
re	Maluma	"AMDV"	June 27, 2020	2	
177	Manuel Turizo	"Quiéreme Mientras Se Pueda"	July 11, 2020	1	
178	Conkarah featuring Shaggy	"Banana"	July 18, 2020	1	
179	BENEE featuring Gus Dapperton	"Supalonely"	July 25, 2020	1	
re	Conkarah featuring Shaggy	"Banana"	August 1, 2020	2	
180	Jawsh 685 x Jason Derulo	"Savage Love (Laxed – Siren Beat)"	August 15, 2020	1	
re	Conkarah featuring Shaggy	"Banana"	August 22, 2020	1	
re	Jawsh 685 x Jason Derulo	"Savage Love (Laxed – Siren Beat)"	August 29, 2020	1	
181	Maluma	"Hawái"	September 5, 2020	3	
182	Natti Natasha	"Que Mal Te Fue"	September 26, 2020	1	
183	BTS	"Dynamite"	October 3, 2020	4	
184	David Guetta & Sia	"Let's Love"	October 31, 2020	2	
185	Sech, Daddy Yankee & J Balvin featuring Rosalía & Farruko	"Relación"	November 14, 2020	1	
re	David Guetta & Sia	"Let's Love"	November 21, 2020	1	
186	Maluma & The Weeknd	"Hawái"	November 28, 2020	2	
187	Christian Nodal & Ángela Aguilar	"Dime Cómo Quieres"	December 12, 2020	1	
188	Manuel Turizo, Myke Towers & Rauw Alejandro	"La Nota"	December 19, 2020	1	
re	Christian Nodal & Ángela Aguilar	"Dime Cómo Quieres"	December 26, 2020	4	
2021
189	Carlos Rivera & Maluma	"100 Años"	January 23, 2021	1	
re	Christian Nodal & Ángela Aguilar	"Dime Cómo Quieres"	January 30, 2021	1	
190	Los Legendarios, Wisin & Myke Towers	"Mi Niña"	February 6, 2021	1	
re	Christian Nodal & Ángela Aguilar	"Dime Cómo Quieres"	February 13, 2021	1	
191	CNCO	"Tan Enamorados"	February 20, 2021	1	
192	Daddy Yankee & Marc Anthony	"De Vuelta Pa'La Vuelta"	February 27, 2021	1	
193	The Weeknd	"Save Your Tears"	March 6, 2021	6	
194	Dua Lipa	"We're Good"	April 17, 2021	1	
195	J Balvin	"Tu Veneno"	April 24, 2021	1	
196	Silk Sonic (Bruno Mars & Anderson .Paak)	"Leave the Door Open"	May 1, 2021	1	
re	The Weeknd	"Save Your Tears"	May 8, 2021	2	
re	Silk Sonic (Bruno Mars & Anderson .Paak)	"Leave the Door Open"	May 22, 2021	1	
197	Manuel Turizo & Maluma	"Amor en Coma"	May 29, 2021	1	
198	Doja Cat featuring SZA	"Kiss Me More"	June 5, 2021	1	
199	BTS	"Butter"	June 12, 2021	1	
200	Gera MX + Christian Nodal	"Botella Tras Botella"	June 19, 2021	1	
re	BTS	"Butter"	June 26, 2021	1	
re	Doja Cat featuring SZA	"Kiss Me More"	July 3, 2021	1	
re	Gera MX + Christian Nodal	"Botella Tras Botella"	July 10, 2021	4	
201	Reik + Maluma	"Perfecta"	August 7, 2021	1	
202	Enrique Iglesias featuring Farruko	"Me Pasé"	August 14, 2021	1	
203	Ed Sheeran	"Bad Habits"	August 21, 2021	4	
204	Tiësto & Karol G	"Don't Be Shy"	September 18, 2021	2	
re	Ed Sheeran	"Bad Habits"	October 2, 2021	1	
re	Tiësto & Karol G	"Don't Be Shy"	October 9, 2021	2	
205	Mario Bautista	"Brindo"	October 16, 2021	5	
206	Omar Chaparro featuring Joey Montana	"Las Locuras Mías"	November 20, 2021	1	
207	Elton John and Dua Lipa	"Cold Heart (Pnau remix)"	November 27, 2021	1	
208	Matisse and Carin Leon	"Como Lo Hice Yo"	December 4, 2021	2	
209	Maná and Alejandro Fernández	"Mariposa Traicionera"	December 18, 2021	2	
2022
210	Daddy Yankee	"Métele al Perreo"	January 1, 2022	1	
re	Maná and Alejandro Fernández	"Mariposa Traicionera"	January 8, 2022	2	
211	Los Ángeles Azules and Nicki Nicole	"Otra Noche"	January 22, 2022	1	
212	Maluma featuring Rayvanny	"Mama Tetema"	January 29, 2022	1	
re	Elton John and Dua Lipa	"Cold Heart (Pnau remix)"	February 5, 2022	1	
213	Adele	"Oh My God"	February 12, 2022	1	
214	Zzoilo	"Mon Amour"	February 19, 2022	3	
215	Maná and Christian Nodal	"Te Lloré Un Río"	March 12, 2022	3	
re	Zzoilo	"Mon Amour"	April 2, 2022	1	
216	Gayle	"ABCDEFU"	April 9, 2022	1	
217	Harry Styles	"As It Was"	April 16, 2022	14	
218	Lizzo	"About Damn Time"	July 23, 2022	3	
219	Natti Natasha, Daddy Yankee and Wisin & Yandel	"Mayor Que Usted"	August 13, 2022	1	
220	Manuel Turizo	"La Bachata"	August 20, 2022	2	
221	Harry Styles	"Late Night Talking"	September 3, 2022	1	

== Artist records ==
=== Most number-one singles ===
Artist	Number-one hits
Maluma	16
J Balvin	11
Calvin Harris	8
Camila	7
Enrique Iglesias	7
Banda Sinaloense MS de Sergio Lizárraga	6
Maná	6
Jesse & Joy	5
Maná	6
Shakira	5
Justin Bieber	4
Alejandro Fernández	4
Ozuna	4
Pitbull	4
Rihanna	4
The Weeknd	4
Pharrell Williams	4
Calibre 50	3

=== Most weeks at number-one ===
Artist	Weeks at number-one
Maluma	46
Calvin Harris	31
Camila	30
J Balvin	27
Enrique Iglesias	25
Bruno Mars	21
Justin Bieber	20
Luis Fonsi	20
Pharrell Williams	20
Daddy Yankee	17
Descemer Bueno	15
Rihanna	15
Gente de Zona	14
Maroon 5	13
Reik	13
Los Ángeles Azules	12
Jesse & Joy	12
Paulina Rubio	12
Harry Styles	12
Belinda	11
Lalo Ebratt	11
PSY	11
Horacio Palencia	11
Mark Ronson	11
Banda Sinaloense MS de Sergio Lizárraga	10
Christina Aguilera	10
Shakira	10
Tones and I	10
Willy William	10
