= Premios Oye! 2010 =

9th Gala Premios Oye!
- Date: November 4, 2010
- Location: Auditorio Banamex, Monterrey, Nuevo León
- Hosted by: Yuri and Javier Poza

Television/radio coverage
- Network: Televisa

The ninth Premios Oye! took place at the new Auditorio Banamex in Monterrey, Nuevo León on November 4, 2010. The nominees were announced on September 3 with Alejandro Fernández receiving 8 nominations. The voting process is certified by PricewaterhouseCoopers.

== Performers ==
- Alejandro Fernández - Cuando Digo Tu Nombre
- Ana Torroja - Sonrisa
- Banda El Recodo - Dime Que Me Quieres
- Banda Los Recoditos - Ando Bien Pedo
- Benny Ibarra - Perder Para Encontra
- Jotdog - Las Pequeñas Cosas
- Koko - Valiente
- Lucero - Indispensable
- Marco Di Mauro - Nada De Nada
- OV7 - Prohibido Quererme
- Pedro Fernández - Amarte A La Antigua
- Playa Limbo - Los Amantes
- Sandoval - Loco Extrano
- Sasha Sokol - Dulce Veneno
- Victor García - Maldita Luna
- Yuri - Tu Eres Para Mi
- Jorge Alejandro Fernández - Creo En Ti

== Presenters ==
- Fernando Colunga
- Paty Cantú
- Kika Edgar
- Alejandro Garza
- Ely Guerra
- Benny Ibarra
- Lisette
- Lisardo
- Mauricio Martínez
- Vielka Valenzuela
- Yurem

== Nominees and winners ==
Winners in Bold

== General Field ==
=== Spanish Album of the Year ===
- (Mexico) **Dejarte De Amar — Camila**
  - Mario Domm, producer.
- (Mexico) Dos Mundos / Evolución — Alejandro Fernández
  - Aureo Baqueiro, Kike Santander & Julio Reyes, producers.
- (Mexico) Métodos De Placer Instantáneo — Aleks Syntek
  - Aleks Syntek, producer.
- (Colombia) Loba — Shakira
  - Shakira, producer.
- (Mexico) Primera Fila — Thalía
  - Aureo Baqueiro, producer.
- (Mexico) Mi destino — Jorge Alejandro Fernández
  - Jorge Alejandro Fernández, producer.

=== Spanish Record of the Year ===
- (Mexico) "Se Me Va la Voz" — Roy Tabare, songwriter (Alejandro Fernández)
- (Mexico) "Aléjate de Mi" - Mario Domm, songwriter (Camila)
- (Mexico) "Mientes" — Mario Domm, Mónica Velez, songwriters (Camila)
- (Venezuela) (Spain) **"Colgando En Tus Manos" — Carlos Baute, songwriter (Carlos Baute featuring Marta Sánchez)**
- (Spain) (Dominican Republic) "Cuando Me Enamoro" — Enrique Iglesias & Descemer Bueno, songwriters (Enrique Iglesias featuring Juan Luis Guerra)

=== Spanish Breakthrough of the Year ===
- (Venezuela) Mi Niña Bonita — Chino & Nacho
- (Mexico) **JotDog — JotDog**
- (Chile) Valiente — Koko
- (Italy) Marco Di Mauro — Marco Di Mauro
- (Mexico) Lo Que Soñamos Siempre Ser — Sandoval

== Pop Field ==
=== Best Male Pop ===
- (Mexico) **Dos Mundos / Evolución — Alejandro Fernández**
- (Mexico) Métodos De Placer Instantáneo — Aleks Syntek
- (Venezuela) De Mi Puño y Letra — Carlos Baute
- (Puerto Rico) No Hay Imposibles — Chayanne
- (Spain) Euphoria — Enrique Iglesias

=== Best Female Pop ===
- (Mexico) Único — Alejandra Guzmán
- (Colombia) Loba — Shakira
- (Mexico) **Primera Fila — Thalía**
- (Mexico) Inusual — Yuri
- (Mexico) Nada es Color de Rosa — Yuridia

=== Best Pop Solo or Duo/Group ===
- (Mexico) **Dejarte De Amar — Camila**
- (Mexico) Electricidad — Jesse & Joy
- (Mexico) JotDog — JotDog
- (Mexico) Año Perfecto — Playa Limbo
- (Mexico) Lo Que Soñamos Siempre Ser — Sandoval

== Rock Field ==
=== Best Rock Solo or Duo/Group ===
- (Spain) Las Consecuencias — Bunbury
- (Mexico) El Tri 4 Décadas En Vivo — El Tri
- (Argentina) **Fuerza Natural — Gustavo Cerati**
- (Mexico) Otra Cosa — Julieta Venegas
- (Mexico) Poetics — Panda

== English ==
=== English Album of the Year ===
- (United States) The Element of Freedom — Alicia Keys
  - Jeff Bhasker, Kerry "Krucial" Brother, Peter Edge, Alicia Keys, Noah "40" Shebib, Swizz Beatz & Al Shux, producers.
- (United States) The E.N.D. — The Black Eyed Peas
  - will.i.am, producer.
- (France) One Love — David Guetta
  - David Guetta, producer.
- (United States) **The Fame Monster — Lady Gaga**
  - Vincent Herbert, producer.
- (United States) Sticky & Sweet Tour — Madonna
  - Madonna, producers.

=== English Record of the Year ===
- (United States) **"I Gotta Feeling" — will.i.am, Allan Pineda, Jaime Gómez & Stacy Ferguson, songwriters (The Black Eyed Peas)**
- (France) (United States) "When Love Takes Over" — Kelly Rowland, Miriam Nervo, Olivia Nervo, David Guetta & Frédéric Riesterer, songwriters (David Guetta featuring Kelly Rowland)
- (United States) "Alejandro" — Lady Gaga & RedOne, songwriters (Lady Gaga)
- (United States) "Bad Romance" — Lady Gaga & RedOne, songwriters (Lady Gaga)
- (United States) "This Is It" — Michael Jackson & Paul Anka, songwriters (Michael Jackson)

=== English Breakthrough of the Year ===
- (United States) 'B.o.B
- (Canada) Justin Bieber
- (United States) Ke$ha
- (United Kingdom) Susan Boyle
- (United States) Glee Cast

== Popular ==
=== Popular Album of the Year ===
- (Mexico) **Dos Mundos / Tradición — Alejandro Fernández**
  - Jorge Alejandro Fernández, producer.
- (Mexico) Me Gusta Todo de Ti — (Banda el Recodo)
  - Alfonso Lizárraga, Joel Lizárraga & María de Jesús Lizárraga, producers.
- (United States) Clásico — Intocable
  - Ramón Ayala, producer.
- (Mexico) La Gran Señora — Jenni Rivera
  - Jenni Rivera, producer.
- (Mexico) Amarte A La Antigua — Pedro Fernández
  - Homero Patrón, producer.

=== Popular Record of the Year ===
- (Mexico) Bandida — Joan Sebastian, songwriter (Alejandro Fernández)
- (Mexico) Estuve - Joan Sebastian, songwriter (Alejandro Fernández)
- (Mexico) Me Gusta Todo De Ti — Horacio Palencia, songwriter (La Arrolladora Banda El Limón)
- (Mexico) Ando Bien Pedo — Zapata, songwriter (Banda Los Recoditos)
- (Mexico) **Amarte A La Antigua — Yoel Enríquez & José Francisco Lugo Leal, songwriters (Pedro Fernández)**

=== Popular Breakthrough of the Year ===
- (Mexico) **Indispensable — Ángel Fresnillo**
- (Mexico) Up! Norteño — Grupo Pisteador
- (Mexico) Evolución Total — Payabrothers
- (Mexico) Con Ganas De Ti — Selecto

=== Best Norteño Solo or Duo/Group ===
- (Mexico) La Jefa — Alicia Villarreal
- (United States) Solamente Tú — Duelo
- (United States) Clásico — Intocable
- (Mexico) **La Granja — Los Tigres del Norte**
- (Mexico) Desde La Cantina Volúmen 1 — Pesado

=== Best Grupero Solo or Duo/Group ===
- (Mexico) Empaca Tus Cosas — Conjunto Primavera
- (Mexico) Pienso En Ti — Grupo Laberinto
- (Mexico) Momentos Y Coincidencias — La Firma
- (Mexico) Raíces — Liberación
- (Mexico) **Cuando Amar Duele — Víctor García**

=== Best Ranchero Solo or Duo/Group ===
- (Mexico) Dos Mundos / Tradición — Alejandro Fernández
- (Mexico) La Gran Señora — Jenni Rivera
- (Mexico) Juan Gabriel — Juan Gabriel
- (Mexico) **Amarte A La Antigua — Pedro Fernández**
- (Mexico) Necesito De Ti — Vicente Fernández

=== Best Banda/Duranguense Solo or Duo/Group ===
- (Mexico) **Me Gusta Todo de Ti — (Banda el Recodo)**
- (Mexico) ¡Ando Bien Pedo! — (Banda Los Recoditos)
- (Mexico) Ni Lo Intentes — Julión Álvarez y Su Norteño Banda
- (Mexico) Sold Out Desde Los Angeles, CA. — La Arrolladora Banda El Limón
- (Mexico) Soy Tu Maestro — La Original Banda El Limón

=== Best Tropical Solo or Duo/Group ===
- (Mexico) Embrujados de Amor y Cumbia — Aarón Y Su Grupo Ilusión
- (Mexico) Rompiendo Cadenas — Ana Bárbara
- (Dominican Republic) **The Last — Aventura**
- (Mexico) Sin Fecha De Caducidad — Celso Piña
- (Colombia) Me Quedo Contigo — Margarita 'La Diosa De La Cumbia'

== Video ==
=== Spanish Video of the Year ===
- (Mexico) **¿Por Qué No Estás Aqui? — Alejandra Guzmán**
  - Fausto Terán, video director; Fausto Terán, video producer
- (Mexico) **Se Me Va la Voz — Alejandro Fernández**
  - Gustavo Garzón, video director; Cecilia Sagredo, video producer
- (Mexico) Aléjate de Mí — Camila
  - Ricardo Calderón, video director
- (Mexico) Mientes — Camila
  - Ricardo Calderón, video director
- (Venezuela) (Spain) "Colgando En Tus Manos" — Carlos Baute featuring Marta Sánchez
  - Luis Álvarez, video director; Luis Álvarez, video producer

Tie between Alejandra Guzmán & Alejandro Fernández.

== Theme from a Telenovela, Movie or T.V. Series ==
=== Spanish Theme of the year ===
- (Mexico) Hasta Que El Dinero Nos Separe — Yoel Enríquez & José Francisco Lugo Leal, songwriters (Pedro Fernández)
  - Emilio Larrosa, producer (Hasta que el dinero nos separe)
- (Spain) (Dominican Republic) **"Cuando Me Enamoro" — Enrique Iglesias & Descemer Bueno, songwriters (Enrique Iglesias featuring Juan Luis Guerra)**
  - Carlos Moreno Laguillo, producer (Cuando Me Enamoro)
- (Mexico) Loca — Aleks Syntek, songwriter (Aleks Syntek)
  - José Alberto Castro, producer (Los Exitosos Perez)
- (Puerto Rico) Me Enamoré De Ti — Ángel L. López, Carlos Celles, EFA, Javier Díaz & Paolo Tondo, songwriters (Chayanne)
  - Salvador Mejía Andrade, producer (Corazón Salvaje)
- (Mexico) "Yo Soy Tu Amigo Fiel" — Aleks Syntek, songwriter (Aleks Syntek featuring Danna Paola)
  - Disney Pixar, producer (Toy Story 3)
- (Mexico) Que Bonito Amor — Vincente Fernández & Jorge Alejandro Fernández, songwriters (Jorge Alejandro Fernández)

== Audience Award ==
- (Mexico) **Alejandro Fernández**

== Best Song with a Message ==
- (Mexico) **Tatiana**

== Tribute to the artistic ==
- (Mexico) **Lucero**

== Special Tribute ==
- (Chile) **Lucho Gatica**
