= Premio Lo Nuestro 2011 =

Latin Music awards show

23rd Lo Nuestro Awards
- Date: February 17, 2011
- Location: American Airlines Arena
- Country: US
- Hosted by: Angélica Vale and Jaime Camil

Television/radio coverage
- Network: Univision

Premio Lo Nuestro 2011 was held on Thursday February 17, 2011 at The American Airlines Arena and was broadcast live on the Univision Network. The nominees were announced on December 2, 2010 during a live televised show "Gala de Nominados", hosted by Lourdes Stephen from Sal y Pimienta and Poncho de Anda from ¡Despierta América! on Univision Network.

== Hosts ==
- Angélica Vale
- Jaime Camil

== Performers ==
Presentations
Artist	Songs
Pitbull	Bon, Bon (opening act)
Camila	Aléjate de mi Bésame with Gloria Trevi; Mientes
Gloria Trevi	Me Río de Tí
Juanes	Regalito
La Arrolladora Banda El Limón	Niña de Mi Corazón
Dyland & Lenny	Quiere Pa' Que Te Quieran
Ricky Martin	Lo Mejor De Mi Vida Eres Tú
Cristian Castro	Various songs from José José
Chino & Nacho	Tu Angelito
Los Tucanes de Tijuana	Soy Todo Tuyo
Alex, Jorge y Lena	Estar Contigo
Tony Dize with RKM & Ken-Y	El Doctorado
Maná	Arde el Cielo; Labios compartidos
Wisin & Yandel with Pitbull and Tego Calderón	Estoy Enamorado; Zun Zun Rompiendo Caderas
Jenni Rivera	Él
Tito El Bambino	Llueve el Amor
Lucero	Indispensable
Prince Royce	El Amor Que Perdimos
Intocable	Robarte Un Beso
Fuego Y Omega	Super Estrella/Que Buena Tu Ta

== Presenters ==
Ninel Conde
Roselyn Sánchez
Javier Poza
Bárbara Bermudo
Jose Luis Terrazas Sr
Jose Luis Terrazas Jr
Guy Ecker
Vanessa Villela
Goyo
Carlos Baute
Ednita Nazario
Gerardo Ortíz
Adamari López
Belinda
J-King & Maximan
Olga Tañón

Juan Luis Guerra
Andrea Legarreta
Zion & Lennox
Diana Reyes
Luis Enrique
Héctor "El Torito" Acosta
Debi Nova
Rodrigo Lombardi
Lili Estefan
Ilia Calderón
Valentino Lanús
Don Francisco
Blanca Soto
Julian Gil
Carolina la O
Larry Hernandez

== Special awards ==
Lifetime Achievement Award (Premio Lo Nuestro a la Excelencia)

- Maná

Special Career Achievement Award (Trayectoria Artista del año)

- Lucero

World Icon Award (Premio Ícono Mundial)

- Ricky Martin

== Pop ==
Category	Winner	Nominees
Album of the Year	Camila — Dejarte de Amar	Carlos Baute — De Mi Puño y Letra; Enrique Iglesias — Euphoria; Chayanne — No Hay Imposibles; Alejandro Sanz — Paraíso Express
Song of the Year	Camila — "Mientes"	Enrique Iglesias featuring Juan Luis Guerra — "Cuando Me Enamoro"; Shakira — "Lo Hecho Está Hecho"; Chayanne — "Me Enamoré de Ti"; Alejandro Fernández — "Se Me Va la Voz"
Best Male Artist	Enrique Iglesias	Alejandro Fernández; Alejandro Sanz; Carlos Baute; Chayanne
Best Female Artist	Shakira	Kany García; Nelly Furtado; Paulina Rubio; Thalía
Best Group or Duo	Camila	Jesse & Joy; La 5ª Estación; Playa Limbo; Tercer Cielo
Breakout Artist of the Year	Jencarlos Canela	Alex, Jorge y Lena; Debi Nova

== Rock ==
Category	Winner	Nominees
Album of the Year	Draco — Amor Vincit Omnia	Vivanativa — Evidencia; Bunbury — Las Consecuencias; El Canto del Loco — Radio Lacolifata presenta: El Canto del Loco
Artist of the Year	Juanes	Vivanativa; Bunbury; El Canto del Loco; Draco
Song of the Year	Juanes — Yerbatero	Draco — Esto es Vida; Bunbury — Frente a Frente; El Canto del Loco — Un millón de cicatrices

== Tropical ==
Category	Winner	Nominees
Album of the Year	Chino & Nacho — Mi Niña Bonita	Huey Dunbar — Huey Dunbar IV; Prince Royce — Prince Royce; Juan Luis Guerra — A Son de Guerra; El Gran Combo de Puerto Rico — Sin Salsa No Hay Paraíso
Song of the Year	Prince Royce - "Stand by Me"	Juan Luis Guerra - "Bachata en Fukuoka"; La India - "Estupida"; Huey Dunbar - "Te Amaré"; Tito El Bambino - "Te Comencé a Querer"
Male Artist of the Year	Prince Royce	Héctor "El Torito" Acosta; Juan Luis Guerra; Luis Enrique; Tito El Bambino
Female Artist of the Year	Olga Tañón	Margarita La Diosa de la Cumbia; Carolina la O; Alexandra; La India
Group or Duo of the Year	Aventura	Carlos & Alejandra; Chino & Nacho; El Gran Combo de Puerto Rico; Grupo Manía
Breakout Artist or Group of the Year	Prince Royce	Bachata Heightz; J'Martin; La Morena; Los Aviadores
Merengue Artist of the Year	Juan Luis Guerra	Grupo Manía; Limi-T 21; Omar Enrique
Tropical Salsa Artist of the Year	Luis Enrique	El Gran Combo de Puerto Rico; Limi-T 21; Huey Dunbar
Tropical Traditional Artist of the Year	Aventura	Carlos & Alejandra; Prince Royce; Héctor "El Torito" Acosta

== Regional Mexican ==
Category	Winner	Nominees
Album of the Year	Banda El Recodo — Me Gusta Todo De Ti	La Original Banda El Limón — Soy Su Maestro (45 Aniversario); Banda Sinaloense MS de Sergio Lizárraga — En Preparación; Banda Los Recoditos — ¡Ando Bien Pedo!; Intocable — Classic
Song of the Year	Banda El Recodo - "Me Gusta Todo De Ti"	La Original Banda El Limon - "Al Menos"; Banda Los Recoditos - "Ando Bien Pedo"; Los Titanes De Durango - "El Enamorado"; Banda Sinaloense MS de Sergio Lizarraga - "Sin Evidencias"
Male Artist of the Year	Espinoza Paz	Joan Sebastian; Julión Álvarez; Larry Hernandez; Pedro Fernández
Female Artist of the Year	Jenni Rivera	Diana Reyes; Graciela Beltrán; Isabela; Paquita la del Barrio
Group or Duo of the Year	Banda El Recodo	El Trono de Mexico; Intocable; La Arrolladora Banda El Limón; La Original Banda El Limón
Breakout Artist or Group of the Year	Gerardo Ortiz	Angel Fresnillo; José Alonso El Plebe; Los Reyes de Arranque; Voz de Mando
Duranguense Artist of the Year	Grupo Montéz de Durango	Conjunto Atardecer; El Trono de Mexico; La Apuesta
Banda of the Year	Espinoza Paz	Banda El Recodo; La Arrolladora Banda El Limón; La Original Banda El Limón
Norteño Artist of the Year	Los Tigres del Norte	Intocable; Los Titanes de Durango; Los Tucanes de Tijuana
Grupera Artist of the Year	Joan Sebastian	Marco Antonio Solís; La Mar-K de Tierra Caliente; Tierra Cali
Ranchera Artist of the Year	Jenni Rivera	Alejandro Fernández; Juan Gabriel; Pedro Fernández

== Urban ==
Category	Winner	Nominees
Album of the Year	Wisin & Yandel — La Revolucion: Evolucion	Angel & Khriz — Da' Take Over; Tony Dize — La Melodía De La Calle: Updated; Daddy Yankee — Daddy Yankee Mundial; Dyland & Lenny — My World
Song of the Year	Wisin & Yandel — Te Siento	Angel & Khriz — Ayer La Vi; Daddy Yankee — Descontrol; Don Omar — Hasta Abajo; Dyland & Lenny - Quiere Pa' Que Te Quieran
Artist of the Year	Pitbull	Daddy Yankee; Don Omar; Tony Dize; Wisin & Yandel
Revelation of the Year	Dyland & Lenny	Cosculluela; Fuego; J-King & Maximan

== Video ==
Category	Winner	Nominees
Video of the Year	Belinda — Egoista ft Pitbull	Choc Quib Town — De Donde Vengo Yo; Ricardo Arjona — Puente; Aleks Syntek — Loca; Jotdog — Hasta Contar a Mil
Premio Lo Nuestro Artist of the Year	Wisin & Yandel	Aventura; Banda el Recodo; Juanes; Shakira
Collaboration of the Year	Enrique Iglesias y Juan Luis Guerra - Cuando Me Enamoro	Alejandro Sanz y Alicia Keys - Looking for Paradise; Carlos Baute y Marta Sanchez - Colgando en tus Manos; Tito el Bambino y Zion y Lennox - Mi Cama Huele a Ti; Wisin & Yandel y Enrique Iglesias - Gracias a Ti
