= Jotdog =

Mexican pop band

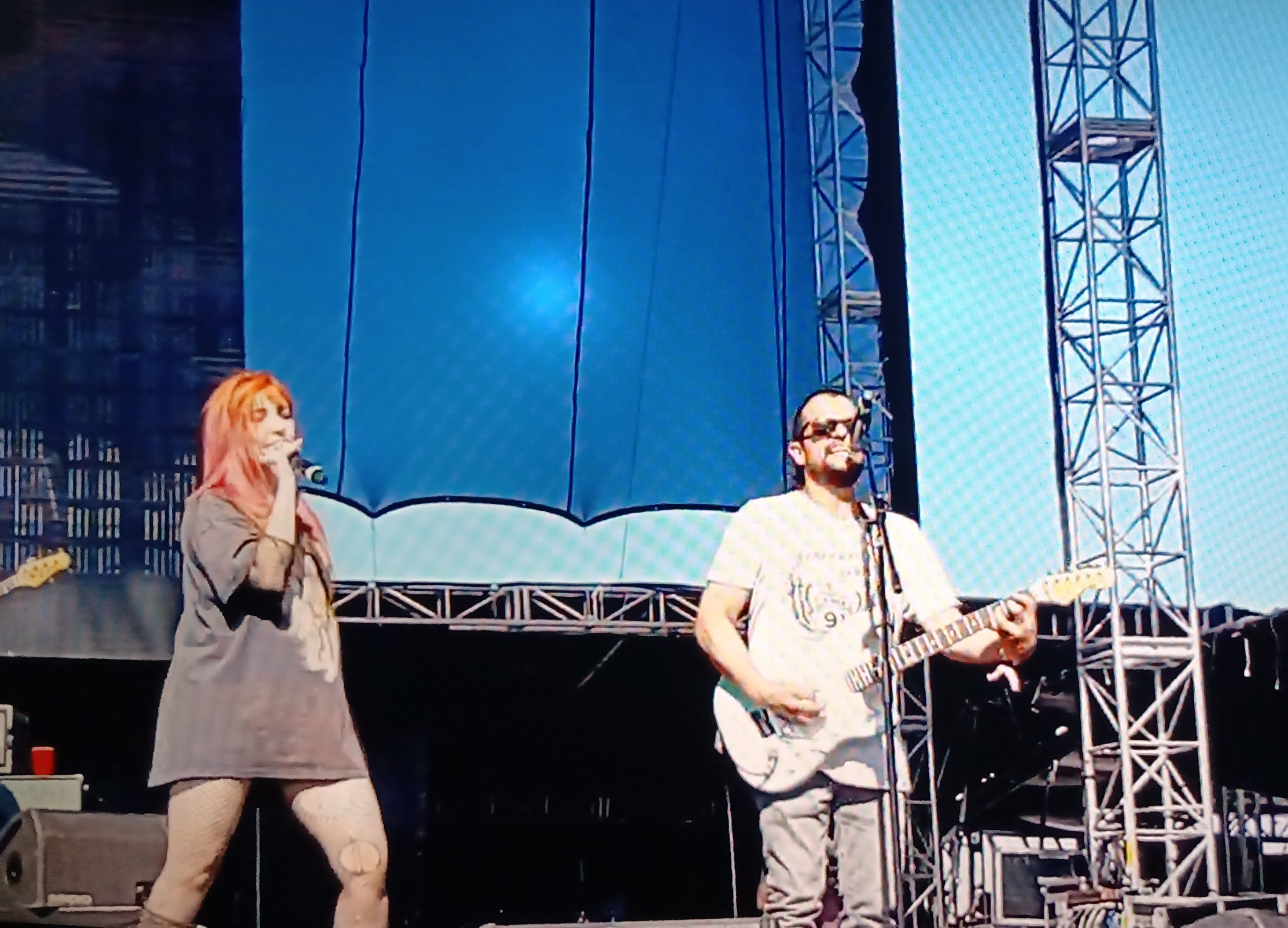
- Jotdog at a concert in 2017.

Background information
- Origin: Mexico, Distrito Federal, Mexico
- Genres: Pop; synthpop
- Years active: 2009–present
- Label: Ocesa Seitrack
- Members: María Barracuda; Jorge "Chiquis" Amaro
- Past members: Alejandro "Midi" Ortega
- Website: jotdog.com.mx

Jotdog (stylized as JotDog) is a Mexican pop band formed in Mexico City in 2009. The group consists of María Barracuda, born Maricela Morales Rodríguez (vocals and lyrics), and Jorge "La Chiquis" Amaro (guitar, bass, keyboards, drums and vocals); formerly Jotdog's sound is indebted to the electronic era but eventually grew to incorporate influences from many genres of popular music. They have maintained a recognisable sound built on melodic instrumentals, highlighted by Amaro's music and Barracuda's expressive vocals. Their lyrics focus on personal themes such as unrequited love.

Their debut album was released in 2009, with 11 songs written by the band members. "Hasta Contar a Mil" was their first single, followed by "Resistir" and "Las Pequeñas Cosas". Jotdog has received nominations for the MTV Video Music Awards Latinoamérica, Premios Oye! and the Latin Grammy Awards.

== Background ==
=== Band members ===
Jotdog is a Mexican pop band formed by María Barracuda, Jorge "Chiquis" Amaro, Their music style is defined as melodic pop, "with surreal messages to leave a festive atmosphere, with smart, clear and urban messages." The band members also had recording careers on their own before forming the band. Jorge "Chiquis" Amaro has been a member of the Mexican bands Fobia, Neon, Rostros Ocultos and Kenny y Los Eléctricos, and also a producer, sound engineer and arranger for Natalia Lafourcade, Maná, Ricardo Arjona, Timbiriche, and Víctimas del Doctor Cerebro; María Barracuda had a solo career;. "From the beginning we thought of Mary [Barracuda] and me as members of the band, because since we met we knew we had chemistry working together in the musical field."

=== Recording process ===
Amaro and Barracuda got together in 2005 to develop songs for other artists, since they worked on Barracuda's debut album. Their musical style was under the pop wave. On those work sessions they wrote "Lo que digo yo", "El Beso" y "I Love You", which they liked and decide to keep to themselves, to later include it on their debut album. To let people know these songs Amaro and Barracuda started a MySpace account without saying their names, "so they [people] would listen without prejudice." After that, they started playing in bars and invite friends to play along, Ivan Gonzalez of Maná, and Midi of Moenia. The tracks were produced by Amaro and the lyrics wrote by him and Barracuda. The name of the band, as stated by Barracuda, was chosen since they wanted to relate to something that sounded very pop and a hot dog is something that may resemble the pop art of Andy Warhol, which clung an element of general culture and turned it into art, "so we take the hot dog and changed it." About forming Jotdog, Amaro said: "We are doing it because we really needed, for that need to take new partners with whom you fall in love to see them in rehearse and you're not sick of playing with them.

Their eponymous debut album was released in 2009, with 11 songs, including a cover version of "True Colors", originally performed by Cyndi Lauper. About performing the song, Barracuda told: "Is a song I always liked it and was part of the same accident. There were several songs that we had prepared for other artist and we kept the best and develop this project." "Hasta Contar a Mil" was chosen as their first single. followed by "Resistir" and "Las Pequeñas Cosas". Jotdog received a Latin Grammy Award nomination for Best Pop Vocal Album, Duo or Group, while the band was nominated for Best New Artist. While reviewing the nominees for this category, Billboard magazine columnist Leila Cobo declared Jotdog as the early favorite to win, along Alex Cuba, since they were "popular in Mexico and with an alternative following built from years in other bands." Alex Cuba won the award, while fellow Mexican band Camila received the award for Best Pop Vocal Album, Duo or Group.

== Second album and collaborations ==
Barracuda said about the second Jotdog album that they want to keep their electronic style, "but we want to experiment with other genres such as cumbia and what we did with my debut album, since Jotdog is in fact María Barracuda in disguise." Jotdog joined Noel Schajris, León Polar, Natalia Lafourcade, Playa Limbo, Pambo, Amandititita, Ha*Ash, Kany García, Moenia, Nikki Clan, Los Leftlovers, Varana, Elis Paprika, and Smitten in a Tribute album to Spanish band Mecano. The band performed the track "Maquillaje".

== Musical style ==
The Jotdog' musical style has generally been described as pop and synthpop.

== Awards and nominations ==
Award	Date of ceremony	Category	Recipients and nominees	Result
Los Premios MTV Latinoamérica	Oct 15, 2009	Best New Artist – North	Jotdog	Nominated
Premios Oye!	Nov 4, 2010	Best New Artist	Jotdog	Won
Premios Oye!	Nov 4, 2010	Best Pop Album by a Duo/Group	Jotdog	Nominated
Latin Grammy Awards	Nov 11, 2010	Best New Artist	Jotdog	Nominated
Latin Grammy Awards	Nov 11, 2010	Best Pop Vocal Album, Duo or Group	Jotdog	Nominated
Telehit Awards	17 November 2010	Breakthrough Artist	Jotdog	Won
Lo Nuestro Awards	Feb 17, 2011	Best Music Video	"Hasta Contar a Mil"	Nominated
Premios Oye!	2012 February 9, 2012	Mejor Grupo Pop	Jotdog	Nominated
Latin Grammy Awards	Nov 15, 2012	Best Pop/Rock Album	Turista del Amor	Nominated
Latin Grammy Awards	Nov 22, 2013	Short Form Music Video	"Corazón de Metal"	Nominated
Latin Grammy Awards	Nov 22, 2015	Best Rock Song	"Celebración"	Nominated
Latin Grammy Awards	Nov 17, 2016	Best Pop/Rock Album	Universos Paralelos	Nominated

== Discography ==
Jotdog discography
- Studio albums: 3
- Singles: 10
- Music videos: 8
- Promotional singles: 1

- Jotdog (2009)
- Turista del Amor (2011)
- Universos Paralelos (2015)

Singles

Year	Title
2009	"Hasta Contar a Mil"
2009	"Resistir"
2010	"Las Pequeñas Cosas"
2011	"Lluvia de Estrellas"
2012	"Turista del Amor"
2012	"Corazón de Metal"
2013	"Sucedeme"
2015	"Celebración"
2016	"Wannabe"
2016	"Universos Paralelos"
