= Las Pequeñas Cosas =

Las Pequeñas Cosas (English: The Little Things) may refer to:

- "Las Pequeñas Cosas", a song by Amanda Miguel, 1984, later covered by Las Chicas del Can and Gloria Trevi
- "Las Pequeñas Cosas", a song by Jotdog from their eponymous album, 2009

== See also ==
- "Las Cosas Pequeñas", a song by Prince Royce, 2012
