= List of number-one Billboard Latin Pop Airplay songs of 2011 =

The Billboard Latin Pop Airplay chart ranks the best-performing Spanish-language pop music singles in the United States. Published by Billboard magazine, the data are compiled by Nielsen SoundScan based on the audience impressions of each single's weekly airplay.

== Chart history ==
Issue date	Song	Artist	Ref
January 1	"Loca"	Shakira featuring El Cata	
January 8	"Loca"	Shakira featuring El Cata	
January 15	"Loca"	Shakira featuring El Cata	
January 22	"Bésame"	Camila	
January 29	"Lo Mejor De Mi Vida Eres Tú"	Ricky Martin featuring Natalia Jiménez	
February 5	"Lo Mejor De Mi Vida Eres Tú"	Ricky Martin featuring Natalia Jiménez	
February 12	"Lo Mejor De Mi Vida Eres Tú"	Ricky Martin featuring Natalia Jiménez	
February 19	"Lo Mejor De Mi Vida Eres Tú"	Ricky Martin featuring Natalia Jiménez	
February 26	"No Me Digas Que No"	Enrique Iglesias featuring Wisin & Yandel	
March 5	"No Me Digas Que No"	Enrique Iglesias featuring Wisin & Yandel	
March 12	"No Me Digas Que No"	Enrique Iglesias featuring Wisin & Yandel	
March 19	"No Me Digas Que No"	Enrique Iglesias featuring Wisin & Yandel	
March 26	"No Me Digas Que No"	Enrique Iglesias featuring Wisin & Yandel	
April 2	"Lluvia al Corazón"	Maná	
April 9	"Lluvia al Corazón"	Maná	
April 16	"Lluvia al Corazón"	Maná	
April 23	"Lluvia al Corazón"	Maná	
April 30	"Lluvia al Corazón"	Maná	
May 7	"Lluvia al Corazón"	Maná	
May 14	"Lluvia al Corazón"	Maná	
May 21	"Lluvia al Corazón"	Maná	
May 28	"Lluvia al Corazón"	Maná	
June 4	"Lluvia al Corazón"	Maná	
June 11	"Lluvia al Corazón"	Maná	
June 18	"Ven a Bailar"	Jennifer Lopez featuring Pitbull	
June 25	"Ven a Bailar"	Jennifer Lopez featuring Pitbull	
July 2	"Ven a Bailar"	Jennifer Lopez featuring Pitbull	
July 9	"Ven a Bailar"	Jennifer Lopez featuring Pitbull	
July 16	"Ven a Bailar"	Jennifer Lopez featuring Pitbull	
July 23	"Give Me Everything"	Pitbull featuring Ne-Yo, Afrojack and Nayer	
July 30	"Give Me Everything"	Pitbull featuring Ne-Yo, Afrojack and Nayer	
August 6	"Give Me Everything"	Pitbull featuring Ne-Yo, Afrojack and Nayer	
August 13	"Give Me Everything"	Pitbull featuring Ne-Yo, Afrojack and Nayer	
August 20	"Amor Clandestino"	Maná	
August 27	"Amor Clandestino"	Maná	
September 3	"Give Me Everything"	Pitbull featuring Ne-Yo, Afrojack and Nayer	
September 10	"Give Me Everything"	Pitbull featuring Ne-Yo, Afrojack and Nayer	
September 17	"Give Me Everything"	Pitbull featuring Ne-Yo, Afrojack and Nayer	
September 24	"Rain Over Me"	Pitbull featuring Marc Anthony	
October 1	"Rain Over Me"	Pitbull featuring Marc Anthony	
October 8	"Rain Over Me"	Pitbull featuring Marc Anthony	
October 15	"Rain Over Me"	Pitbull featuring Marc Anthony	
October 22	"Rain Over Me"	Pitbull featuring Marc Anthony	
October 29	"El Amor"	Ricardo Arjona	
November 5	"Promise"	Romeo Santos featuring Usher	
November 12	"Promise"	Romeo Santos featuring Usher	
November 19	"Promise"	Romeo Santos featuring Usher	
November 26	"El Verdadero Amor Perdona"	Maná featuring Prince Royce	
December 3	"El Verdadero Amor Perdona"	Maná featuring Prince Royce	
December 10	"El Verdadero Amor Perdona"	Maná featuring Prince Royce	
December 17	"El Verdadero Amor Perdona"	Maná featuring Prince Royce	
December 24	"El Verdadero Amor Perdona"	Maná featuring Prince Royce	
December 31	"Promise"	Romeo Santos featuring Usher	
