= Hacia Adentro =

Studio album by Camila
- Released: May 21, 2019
- Recorded: 2018–2019
- Genre: Latin
- Label: Sony Music Latin
- Producer: Mario Domm, Pablo Hurtado

Camila chronology
Elypse (2014)	Hacia Adentro (2019)	Regresa (2024)

Singles from Hacia Adentro
- 1. "Cianuro y miel" Released: November 29, 2018; 2. "Te Confieso" Released: January 24, 2019; 3. "Sobreviviendo" Released: April 10, 2019; 4. "Energia" Released: April 25, 2019

Hacia Adentro (Into) is the fourth studio album by the Mexican band Camila.

The album marks the reappearance of the band after a five-year hiatus due to personal problems suffered by both Mario Domn and Pablo Hurtado. Camila released their unreleased album "Hacia Adentro" with which they defend the romanticism of pop.

From this album, some singles are released such as: «Cianuro y miel», «Te Confieso», «Sobreviviendo» and «Energía», which has two video clips.

It was nominated for "Best Traditional Pop Vocal Album" at the 20th Annual Latin Grammy Awards 2019. One of the album's music producers and co-songwriter is Venezuelan artist Reggi El Autentico.

== Track listing ==
1. "Te confieso"
2. "Energia"
3. "Sobreviviendo"
4. "Hacia Adentro"
5. "Click"
6. "No por compromiso"
7. "Nueve meses"
8. "Cianuro y miel"
9. "Absurda gravedad"
10. "Me dijiste aquella vez"
