= Jotdog (album) =

Studio album by Jotdog
- Released: 2009
- Recorded: 2008–2009; Chicken Station Studios
- Genre: Latin pop, synthpop
- Language: Spanish
- Label: Sei Track
- Producer: Jorge "La Chiquis" Amaro

Jotdog chronology
Jotdog (2009)	Turista Del Amor (2011-2012)

Singles from Jotdog
- 1. "Hasta Contar a Mil"; 2. "Resistir"; 3. "Las Pequeñas Cosas"; 4. "El Beso"

Jotdog is the debut studio album by Mexican group Jotdog. It was released on 2009 by Sei Track. The album is produced and arranged by Jorge "Chiquis" Amaro, with lead vocals by María Barracuda. The songs are mostly inspired by unrequited love, and deals with romantic relationships from different points of view. Musically, the album drew inspiration from '80s electropop and synthpop while incorporating dance music and clear hooks. The album received positive reviews, with critics commending Amaro's production and Barracuda's lyrics, and comparing their lineup and musical style to the bands Garbage and Mecano. The singles from Jotdog, "Hasta Contar a Mil", "Resistir" and "Las Pequeñas Cosas", were well received by the audience. Jotdog promoted the album by performing the songs in a number of live appearances. Jotdog was re-released with a bonus DVD with additional features and received nominations for the Premios Oye! and the Latin Grammy Awards.

== Background ==
Jotdog is a Mexican pop band formed by María Barracuda, Jorge "Chiquis" Amaro, and originally by Alejandro "Midi" Ortega. Their music style is defined as melodic pop, "with surreal messages to leave a festive atmosphere, with smart, clear and urban messages." The band members also had recording careers on their own before forming the band. Amaro has been a member of the Mexican bands Fobia, Neon, Rostros Ocultos and Kenny y Los Eléctricos, and also a producer, sound engineer and arranger for Natalia Lafourcade, Maná, Ricardo Arjona, Timbiriche, and Víctimas del Doctor Cerebro; Barracuda had a solo career; and Ortega played synthesizers on the band Moenia.

== Recording process ==
Amaro and Barracuda got together in 2005 to develop songs for other artists, since they worked on Barracuda's debut album. Their musical style was under the pop wave. On those work sessions they wrote "Lo que digo yo", "El Beso" y "I Love You", which they liked and decide to keep to themselves, to later include it on the album. To let people know these songs Amaro and Barracuda started a MySpace account without saying their names, "so they [people] would listen without prejudice." After that, they started playing in bars and invite friends to play along, Ivan Gonzalez of Maná, and Midi of Moenia. The tracks were produced by Amaro and the lyrics wrote by him and Barracuda. The album includes 11 original songs and a cover version of "True Colors", originally performed by Cyndi Lauper. About performing the song, Barracuda said: "Is a song I always liked it and was part of the same accident. There were several songs that we had prepared for other artist and we kept the best and develop this project." "Hasta Contar a Mil" was chosen as the first single. followed by "Resistir" and "Las Pequeñas Cosas".

== Critical reception and accolades ==
Professional ratings
Review scores
Source	Rating
Allmusic	4/5 stars

Mariano Prunes of Allmusic gave the album four stars (out of five), naming the album "an astutely designed pop concoction by a savvy multi-instrumentalist-producer and an alluring chanteuse", praising their choice to replace alternative punk/edge with '80s synth pop, with "Hasta Contar a Mil", "El Beso" and "Piensa en Mí" mentioned as the highlights of the album. Prunes also referred to Jotdog as the Mexican answer to American band Garbage and also stated that Spanish band Mecano was the group "most obvious influence." He also said that the dance-oriented tracks such as "Baila Sin Parar" were emotionally flat and lame.

Jotdog received a Latin Grammy Award nomination for Best Pop Album by a Duo or Group with Vocals, which was awarded to Mexican band Camila. The album received the same nomination at the Mexican Premios Oye! 2010.

== Track listing ==
- Information adopted from Billboard magazine and album liner notes.

No.	Title	Writer(s)	Length
1.	"I Love You"	María Barracuda, Jorge "Chiquis" Amaro	3:34
2.	"Lo Que Digo Yo"	Barracuda, Amaro	3:13
3.	"Hasta Contar a Mil"	Amaro	3:26
4.	"El Beso"	Barracuda, Amaro	3:40
5.	"Las Pequeñas Cosas"	Barracuda, Amaro	3:54
6.	"Vives en Mis Sueños"	Barracuda, Amaro	3:30
7.	"Pobrecito"	Barracuda, Amaro	3:50
8.	"Piensa en Mí (Alt. Version)"	Barracuda, Amaro, I. Glez	3:51
9.	"Resistir"	Amaro	3:35
10.	"Colores"	Tom Kelly, Billy Steinberg, Barracuda	3:55
11.	"Mírame! Mírate! (Invencible)"	Barracuda, Amaro	3:49
12.	"Baila Sin Parar"	Barracuda, Amaro	3:49
13.	"Corazón Violento"	Barracuda, Amaro	3:27
14.	"Las Pequeñas Cosas (Sweet Suite Version by PGG)"	Barracuda, Amaro	6:25
15.	"Piensa en Mí"	Barracuda, Amaro, I. Glez	3:51

Deluxe edition CD/DVD (DVD)
No.	Title	Length
1.	"Hasta Contar a Mil (Video)"
2.	"Hasta Contar a Mil (Making of)"
3.	"Resistir (Video)"
4.	"Resistir (Making of)"
5.	"Las Pequeñas Cosas (Making of)"
6.	"Piensa en Mí (Alt. Version) (Making of)"

American edition
No.	Title	Length
1.	"Hasta Contar a Mil"
2.	"Lo Que Digo Yo"
3.	"El Beso"
4.	"Las Pequeñas Cosas"
5.	"Piensa En Mí"
6.	"Resistir"
7.	"Pobrecito"
8.	"Colores"
9.	"Mírame! Mírate!"
10.	"Baila Sin Parar"
11.	"Vives en Mis Sueños"

== Personnel ==
- María Barracuda – lead vocals, lyrics
- Jorge "Chiquis" Amaro – programming, producer, bass, synthesizer, keyboard, guitar, drums, backing vocals
- Daniel Aceves – drums
- Alejandro "Midi" Ortega – programming, synthesizer
- I. Glez – piano
- G. Bronfman – cello
- Tony Peluso – backing vocals
- Sergio Santacruz – backing vocals
- Sociedad Anonima – graphic design

== Charts ==
The album debuted at number 87 on the Mexican albums chart, climbing to number 52 after nine weeks.

=== Weekly charts ===
Chart (2010)	Peak position
Mexican Album Chart	52
