= Bésame (Camila song) =

Single by Camila

from the album Dejarte de Amar
- Released: August 2, 2010
- Recorded: 2009
- Genre: Latin pop · pop rock
- Length: 4:12
- Label: Sony Music Latin
- Songwriters: Mario Domm, Monica Véléz
- Producer: Mario Domm

Camila singles chronology
"Aléjate de Mi" (2010)	"Bésame" (2010)	"Entre Tus Alas" (2011)

"Bésame" (English: "Kiss Me") is a song by Mexican pop/rock group Camila, released on August 2, 2010, as the third single from their second album, Dejarte de Amar (2010). "Bésame" was written by Mario Domm, Mónica Vélez and produced by Domm. The song reached number one on the US Billboard Latin Pop Airplay charts.

== Charts ==
Chart (2010)	Peak position
Mexico Top General (Monitor Latino)	1
US Hot Latin Songs (Billboard)	9
US Latin Pop Airplay (Billboard)	1

=== Certifications ===
Region	Certification	Certified units/sales
Mexico (AMPROFON)	Diamond+2× Platinum	420,000^{‡}
^{‡} Sales+streaming figures based on certification alone.

== Release history ==
Region	Date	Label	Format
United States	August 2, 2010	Sony Music Latin	CD single
United States	August 2, 2010	Sony Music Latin	Digital download

== See also ==
- List of number-one songs of 2010 (Mexico)
- List of number-one Billboard Hot Latin Pop Airplay of 2011
