= Banana (Conkarah song) =

2019 single by Conkarah

Single by Conkarah featuring Shaggy
- Released: 16 August 2019
- Recorded: 2019
- Genre: Reggae
- Label: S-Curve Records / BMG Rights
- Songwriters: Original: Traditional, arranged: Harry Belafonte, William Attaway, Lord Burgess; 2019 adaptation: Orville Burrell (aka Shaggy), Dwayne Shippy, Nicholas Murray, Shane Hoosong, Simon Pipe
- Producers: Shaggy, Dwayne Shippy, Shane Hoosong, Simon Pipe

Conkarah singles chronology
"My Love" (2019)	"Banana" (2019)

Shaggy singles chronology
"You" (2019)	"Banana" (2019)	"Bromance (2k18 Remix)" (2019)

Music video
- "Banana" on YouTube

"Banana [DJ FLe - Minisiren Remix]"

Single by Conkarah featuring Shaggy
- Released: 17 July 2020
- Recorded: 2020
- Genre: Reggae
- Label: S-Curve Records / BMG Rights

Conkarah singles chronology
"Better" (2020)	"Banana [DJ FLe - Minisiren Remix]" (2020)

Shaggy singles chronology
"Please Pickup the Phone" (2020)	"Banana [DJ FLe - Minisiren Remix]" (2020)

Music video
- "Banana" [DJ FLe - Minisiren Remix] on YouTube

Banana Remix EP

EP by Conkarah
- Released: 17 July 2020
- Recorded: 2020
- Length: 22:12
- Label: S-Curve Records

Singles from Banana Remix EP
- 1. "Banana (DJ FLe – Minisiren Remix)" Released: 17 July 2020

"Banana" is a song by the Jamaican reggae artist Conkarah featuring the Jamaican international artist Shaggy. The song released in 2019 by S-Curve Records samples largely and is an adaptation of a famous song by Harry Belafonte called "Day-O (The Banana Boat Song)" released in 1956. The Belafonte original is a work song, from the point of view of dock workers working the night shift loading bananas onto ships. The lyrics describe how daylight has come, their shift is over, and they want their work to be counted up so that they can go home.

== Dj FLe – Sick Wit it Crew Minisiren Remix ==
Conkarah's song trended after the popularity of the "banana drop challenge" in the spring of 2020, where TikTok users utilized a particular version of "Banana" which was remixed and produced by DJ FLe of Sick Wit it Crew. The challenge is as follows: As one is dancing, his or her glasses or more prominently sunglasses are propped on top of the dancer's head. After a few frenetic dance and hand moves, the glasses drop over the dancer's eyes at the exact right time in the song where the lyrics say "Sick Wit it Crew Drop" before the siren solo comes in.

== Performance ==
"Banana" became an international hit and topped the Dutch Top 40 chart for 5 consecutive weeks starting the week ending 27 June 2020 until 25 July 2020. It also charted in a great number of European and international charts. The DJ FLe Minisiren Remix has also become one of the most-used songs on TikTok, accumulating over 26 million video creations as of March 2026, ranking 18th among the most-used songs on the platform worldwide.

== Track listing ==
Banana Remix EP (released 17 July 2020)

1. "Banana" (featuring Shaggy) [DJ FLe – Minisiren Remix] – 3:30
2. "Banana" (featuring Shaggy) [Dave Audé Remix] – 3:21
3. "Banana" (featuring Shaggy) [Lady Bee Remix] – 2:25
4. "Banana" (featuring Shaggy) [Faustix Remix] – 2:40
5. "Banana" (featuring Shaggy) [Dinaire + Bissen Remix] – 5:49
6. "Banana" (featuring Shaggy) [James Anthony's Big Room Remix] – 4:37

== Charts ==
=== Weekly charts ===
Chart (2019–2020)	Peak position
Austria (Ö3 Austria Top 40)	67
Belgium (Ultratop 50 Flanders)	7
Belgium (Ultratop 50 Wallonia)	37
Canada Hot 100 (Billboard)	61
France (SNEP)	46
Germany (GfK)	72
Italy (FIMI)	97
Netherlands (Dutch Top 40)	1
Netherlands (Single Top 100)	3
Norway (VG-lista)	22
Poland Airplay (ZPAV)	31
Portugal (AFP)	145
Suriname (Nationale Top 40)	1
Switzerland (Schweizer Hitparade)	61

2025 weekly chart performance for "Banana"
Chart (2025)	Peak position
North Macedonia Airplay (Radiomonitor)	10

2026 weekly chart performance for "Banana"
Chart (2026)	Peak position
North Macedonia Airplay (Radiomonitor)	16

=== Year-end charts ===
Chart (2020)	Position
Belgium (Ultratop Flanders)	62
Netherlands (Dutch Top 40)	19
Netherlands (Single Top 100)	32

== Certifications ==
Region	Certification	Certified units/sales
Belgium (BRMA)	Gold	20,000^{‡}
Brazil (Pro-Música Brasil)	2× Platinum	80,000^{‡}
Canada (Music Canada)	Platinum	80,000^{‡}
France (SNEP)	Gold	100,000^{‡}
Italy (FIMI)	Gold	35,000^{‡}
Netherlands (NVPI)	Gold	40,000^{‡}
Norway (IFPI Norway)	Gold	30,000^{‡}
Poland (ZPAV)	Gold	25,000^{‡}
Spain (Promusicae)	Gold	20,000^{‡}
Streaming
Sweden (GLF)	Gold	4,000,000^{†}
^{‡} Sales+streaming figures based on certification alone.^{†} Streaming-only figures based on certification alone.
