= Elypse =

Studio album by Camila
- Released: June 3, 2014
- Genre: Latin
- Length: 47:17
- Label: Sony Music Latin
- Producer: Mario Domm, Pablo Hurtado

Camila chronology
Dejarte de Amar (2010)	Elypse (2014)	Hacia Adentro (2019)

Singles from Elypse
- 1. "Decidiste Dejarme" Released: March 24, 2014; 2. "Perdón" Released: May 29, 2014; 3. "Quédate" Released: January 13, 2015

Elypse is the third studio album released by Camila on June 3, 2014. The album was the first released by the band as a duo, after the departure of singer Samo. The song "Perdón" was featured in the novela La Malquerida starring Victoria Ruffo, Christian Meier, and Ariadne Díaz. The album was nominated for Album of the Year and won for Best Contemporary Pop Vocal Album at the 2014 Latin Grammy Awards. At the Grammy Awards of 2015 it was nominated for Best Latin Pop Album.

== Track listing ==
No.	Title	Writer(s)	Length
1.	"Decidiste Dejarme"	Lauren Evans, Mario Domm, Mónica Vélez	3:31
2.	"Perdón"	Mario Domm, Mónica Vélez	4:25
3.	"Quédate"	Mario Domm, Mónica Vélez	3:32
4.	"Este Momento"	Mario Domm, Mónica Véle, Vincente Garcia	4:10
5.	"De Venus"	Carlos Murguía, Edgar Oceransky, Mario Domm, Paulyna Carraz	3:42
6.	"Tu Tiempo Ya Se Fue"	Mario Domm, Mónica Vélez, Vincente Garcia	4:06
7.	"Me Enseñaste a Odiar"	Mario Dommm Mónica Vélez	3:40
8.	"La Vida Entera"	Mario Domm	3:49
9.	"No Hay Vuelta Atrás"	Pablo Hurtado	3:21
10.	"Adicto al Dolor"	Mario Domm, Mónica Vélez	3:34
11.	"Lágrimas"	Mario Domm, Mónica Vélez	4:09
12.	"Tú"	Mario Domm, Mónica Vélez	5:33
Total length:			47:17

== Charts ==
=== Weekly charts ===
Chart (2014)	Peak position
Argentine Albums (CAPIF)	3
Mexican Albums (AMPROFON)	3
Spanish Albums (PROMUSICAE)	17
US Billboard 200	152
US Latin Pop Albums (Billboard)	3
US Top Latin Albums (Billboard)	5

=== Year-end charts ===
Chart (2014)	Position
US Latin Albums	36
US Latin Pop Albums	12

=== Certifications ===
Region	Certification	Certified units/sales
Mexico (AMPROFON)	2× Platinum+Gold	150,000^{‡}
^{‡} Sales+streaming figures based on certification alone.
