= Todo Cambió =

Studio album by Camila
- Released: May 9, 2006
- Recorded: 2005–2006
- Studio: Studio 19; Mamita Studio (Mexico City, Mexico); Henson Studios; Conway Recording Studios (Hollywood, California)
- Genre: Latin pop · pop rock · alternative rock
- Length: 37:01
- Label: Sony BMG Norte
- Producer: Mario Domm

Camila chronology
Todo Cambió (2006)	Dejarte de Amar (2010)

Singles from Todo Cambió
- 1. "Abrázame" Released: March 13, 2006; 2. "Coleccionista de Canciones" Released: July 31, 2006; 3. "Todo Cambió" Released: December 11, 2006; 4. "Yo Quiero" Released: March 12, 2007; 5. "Sólo Para Ti" Released: May 7, 2007; 6. "Sin Tu Amor" Released: October 8, 2007; 7. "Me Da Igual" Released: February 11, 2008; 8. "Perderte de Nuevo" Released: March 31, 2008

Todo Cambió (English: Everything Changed) is the debut studio album recorded by Mexican pop rock band Camila. It was released by Sony BMG Norte on May 9, 2006. The album was mainly written and composed by the band members: Samo, Pablo Hurtado, and Mario Domm, and includes a blend of Spanish rock and Latin pop.

It was released in Mexico on April 18, 2006, where it was eventually certified three-times platinum with sales over 300,000 units. In the United States, the release date was set on May 9, 2006 and the album received a platinum certification by the Latin field of the Recording Industry Association of America on July 24, 2007. In Spain the album was released on May 13, 2008.

This album yielded eight singles, including: "Abrázame", "Coleccionista de Canciones", "Todo Cambió", "Sin Tu Amor", "Sólo Para Tí", "Yo Quiero", "Me Da Igual" and "Perderte de Nuevo". For the album's release in Spain, "Todo Cambió" was chosen as the lead single.

== Album recording ==
About the album composing and recording, the band declared: "We came out from a garage, the living room and the closet, not to compete, only to show little fragments of our lives through the music we make." While producing Reyli Barba's album, Mario Domm asked Samo to participate on backing vocals, and on those recording sessions decided to make a band. Pablo Hurtado had to make an audition for the gig of guitar player, and after that, they wrote the songs for the album. Regarding the song style and inspiration, Mario Domm wanted to let people hear the music they were creating in their living rooms and to express how much joy they had performing together. Samo (a former church performer) found his inspiration watching television, singing along with other performers, stating: "Everything I learned is on these lyrics." Pablo Hurtado, the youngest member of the band, dedicates his lyrics to "weekend love affairs" and about the track "Me Da Igual" he says: "I wrote it on a very hard moment of my life, it is about a love that never happened."

== Awards and recognition ==
The title track has been the recipient of many awards and nominations, including a Latin Grammy Award nomination for Song of the Year in 2007 and the Best Song award at the Premios Lo Nuestro 2008, where the band also won in the Group or Duo of the year field. For the Premios Juventud of 2008 the group received the following nominations: Red Hot Artist, Catchiest Tune ("Todo Cambió"), CD to die for (Todo Cambió: Special Edition), and won for Best Ballad ("Todo Cambió") and Favorite Pop Star. At the 2007 Latin Billboard Music Awards, the band won for Duo or Group of the Year and Latin Pop Airplay Song of the Year ("Todo Cambió"). The album was also nominated for Latin Album of the Year. Camila also won two awards at Los Premios MTV Latinoamérica for Best New Artist - North and Breakthrough Artist.

== Track listing ==
=== U.S. track listing ===
The track listing from Billboard.

No.	Title	Writer(s)	Length
1.	"Abrázame"	Mario Domm	3:51
2.	"U Got My Love"	Mario Domm· Xuan Long	3:14
3.	"Me Bastó"	Mario Domm · Samo · Pablo Hurtado	3:13
4.	"Todo Cambió"	Mario Domm · José Luis Ortega	3:14
5.	"Coleccionista de Canciones"	Mario Domm · Paulyna Carraz	5:07
6.	"Yo Quiero"	Mario Domm · Etore Grenci	3:27
7.	"Me Da Igual"	Pablo Hurtado	3:38
8.	"Va Para Ti"	Mario Domm	2:59
9.	"Sin Tu Amor"	Mario Domm · Samo	2:43
10.	"Perderte de Nuevo"	Mario Domm · María Bernal · Samo	3:00
11.	"Nanga Ti Feo"	Demetrio López	2:39

=== Special edition CD/DVD ===
On August 14, 2007, a Special edition of the album was released. It includes the track listing from the original release, with 3 acoustic tracks and a new song, "Sólo Para Ti", which was recorded for the soundtrack of the Mexican film "Cansada de Besar Sapos". A DVD was also included with the 4 music videos.

CD

No.	Title	Writer(s)	Length
12.	"Abrázame [Acoustic]"	Mario Domm	3:51
13.	"Coleccionista de Canciones [Acoustic]"	Mario Domm · Paulyna Carraz ·	4:36
14.	"U Got My Love [Acoustic]"	Mario Domm · Xuan Long	2:54
15.	"Sólo Para Ti"	Mario Domm	3:08

DVD

No.	Title	Writer(s)	Length
1.	"Abrázame"	Mario Domm	3:51
2.	"Coleccionista de Canciones"	Mario Domm · Paulyna Carraz	5:20
3.	"Todo Cambió"	Mario Domm · José Luis Ortega	3:15
4.	"Sólo Para Ti"	Mario Domm	3:05
5.	"Esto Es De Verdad "La Historia De Camila" (Documental)"
6.	"Galería De Fotos"

=== Spain track listing ===
This information from La Higuera.

No.	Title	Writer(s)	Length
1.	"Abrázame"	Mario Domm	3:33
2.	"Me Bastó"	Mario Domm · Samo· Pablo Hurtado	3:20
3.	"Todo Cambió"	Mario Domm · José Luis Ortega	3:18
4.	"Coleccionista de Canciones"	Mario Domm · Paulyna Carraz	5:15
5.	"Yo Quiero"	Mario Domm · Etore Grenci	3:30
6.	"Me Da Igual"	Pablo Hurtado	3:40
7.	"Va Para Ti"	Mario Domm	3:05
8.	"Sin Tu Amor"	Mario Domm · Samo	2:50
9.	"Perderte de Nuevo"	Mario Domm · Samo · María Bernal	2:55
10.	"U Got My Love"	Mario Domm · Xuan Long	3:30
11.	"Nanga Ti Feo"	Demetrio López	2:40
12.	"Sólo Para Ti"	Mario Domm	3:02
13.	"Yo Soy Quien"	Mario Domm	3:07

=== Brazilian version ===
For the Brazilian release, the same track listing as in Spain was included, but instead of the track "Yo Soy Quien", a re-recording of the single "Abrázame" with Brazilian singer Wanessa Camargo (who also wrote verses in Portuguese for the song), retitled as "Abrázame/Me Abrace", is track 13.

No.	Title	Writer(s)	Length
13.	"Abrázame/Me Abrace [Duet with Wanessa Camargo]"	Mario Domm · José Luis Ortega · Wanessa Camargo	3:33

== Personnel ==
- Mario Domm — Piano, arranger, hammond organ, programming, vocals, didjeridu, Rhodes piano, realization, recording
- Samo - Voice, Gospel Arrangements
- Pablo Hurtado — Guitar, pedal steel, arranger, slide guitar, electronics, vocals, editing assistant
- Freddy Cañedo — Arranger, bass
- Gabriel Castañón — Digital editing, mixing, recording
- Daniel Castillo — Vocals, assistant
- Benny Faccone — Recording
- Paul Forat — Executive producer, A&R
- Carlos García — A&R
- Bernie Grundman — Mastering
- Jorge Juárez — Percussion
- Peter Mokran — Mixing
- Daniel Parra — Adaptation
- Edy Vega — Arranger, drums
- David West — Percussion
- Seth Waldmann — Assistant
- Ricardo Calderon — Photography

== Charts and certifications ==
=== Charts ===
Chart (2006/2008)	Peak position
Mexican Albums Chart	2
US Billboard 200	76
US Billboard Top Latin Albums	1
US Billboard Latin Pop Albums	1
US Billboard Top Heatseekers	38

=== Certifications ===
Region	Certification	Certified units/sales
Argentina (CAPIF)	Gold	20,000^{^}
Argentina (CAPIF) CD+DVD Edition	Gold	20,000^{^}
Mexico (AMPROFON)	Diamond+Platinum	600,000^{‡}
United States (RIAA)	Platinum (Latin)	100,000^{^}
^{^} Shipments figures based on certification alone.^{‡} Sales+streaming figures based on certification alone.
