= Mientes =

Single by Camila

from the album Dejarte de Amar
- Released: November 16, 2009
- Recorded: 2009
- Genre: Latin pop
- Length: 3:25
- Label: Sony Music Latin
- Songwriter: Mario Domm · Mónica Vélez
- Producer: Mario Domm

Camila singles chronology
"Me Da Igual" (2008)	"Mientes" (2009)	"Aléjate de Mí" (2010)

"Mientes" (English: You Lie) is a song by Mexican pop group Camila released as the lead single from their second studio album, Dejarte de Amar (2010) released on November 16, 2009 through Sony Music, the song was written by Mario Domm and Mónica Vélez. The song was also part of the soundtrack of Mexican telenovela Corazón Salvaje (2009-2010). The song received two Latin Grammy Awards for Song of the Year and Record of the Year.

== Commercial performance ==
The song peaked at number four on the Hot Latin Tracks, number one on the Top Latin Pop Songs and number 21 on the Tropical Songs, becoming on their most successful single to date on the US Billboard charts. The song also topped the Mexican Airplay Chart and peaked at number 11 on the Spanish Singles Chart, where was certified Gold, more than 20.000 copies, on March 15, 2014.

== Music video ==
The music video was directed by Ricardo Calderón and filmed at colonia San Rafael in Mexico City. The video features the group playing the theme and in parallel the story of a couple living misunderstandings, disappointments and lies that lead to loss. A set of infidelity and indifference between a model and a rockstar.

== Accolades ==
Year	Ceremony	Award	Result
2010	Latin Grammy	Record of the Year	Won
2010	Latin Grammy	Song of the Year	Won
2010	Los Premios 40 Principales	Best Latin Song	Won

== Track listing ==
iTunes Digital download

1. "Mientes" (Mario Domm, Mónica Vélez) - 3:25

== Charts ==
=== Weekly charts ===
Chart (2009–2010)	Peak position
Mexico Top General (Monitor Latino)	1
Spain (Promusicae)	11
Spain Airplay Chart	8
US Hot Latin Songs (Billboard)	4
US Latin Pop Airplay (Billboard)	1
US Tropical Airplay (Billboard)	21

=== Year-end charts ===
Chart (2010)	Position
US Hot Latin Songs (Billboard)	15

=== Certifications ===
Region	Certification	Certified units/sales
Mexico (AMPROFON)	3× Diamond+Platinum+Gold	990,000^{‡}
Spain (Promusicae)	Platinum	100,000^{‡}
^{‡} Sales+streaming figures based on certification alone.

== Release history ==
Region	Date	Format	Label
Mexico	November 16, 2009	Radio impact	Sony
United States	November 17, 2009	Digital download	Columbia

== See also ==
- List of number-one songs of 2010 (Mexico)
