= Dejarte de Amar =

Studio album by Camila
- Released: February 9, 2010
- Recorded: June – September 2009
- Studios: Estudio 19, Mexico City, Mexico; Mamita Studio, Mexico City, Mexico; Henson, Hollywood, California; Conway, Hollywood, California
- Genres: Latin pop; pop rock; emo; alternative rock; Latin rock
- Length: 41:59
- Label: Sony Music Latin
- Producer: Mario Domm (also executive)

Camila chronology
Todo Cambió (2006)	Dejarte de Amar (2010)	Elypse (2014)

Singles from Dejarte de Amar
- 1. "Mientes" Released: November 16, 2009; 2. "Aléjate de Mí" Released: April 9, 2010; 3. "Bésame" Released: August 2, 2010; 4. "Entre Tus Alas" Released: February 5, 2011; 5. "De Mí" Released: June 20, 2011; 6. "¿De Qué Me Sirve La Vida?" Released: October 31, 2011

Dejarte de Amar (English: Stop Loving You) is the second studio album recorded by Mexican pop rock band Camila, It was released by Sony Music Latin on February 9, 2010 (see 2010 in music) Produced by band leader Mario Domm and mostly written by Domm and Mónica Velez, the album became a success in the United States and Mexico. The album was certified Disco Platino in the United States by the RIAA and 4× Platinum in Mexico by AMPROFON. It was recorded in Mexico at Mamita Studio with theme about love, loneliness and lies. The album spawned three singles: "Mientes", "Aléjate de Mi", and "Bésame", all of which reached number-one on the Billboard Latin Pop Airplay chart. The album received generally positive reviews for its arrangements and compositions.

The album reached number-one on the Billboard Top Latin Albums and Latin Pop Albums in the United States and number-one on the Mexican Albums Chart. It received a Latin Grammy award for Best Pop Vocal Album by a Duo or Group and a nomination for Album of the Year. The lead single, "Mientes", received two Latin Grammy awards for Song of the Year and Record of the Year. The album is currently nominated a Lo Nuestro award for "Latin Pop Album of the Year". Mientes was featured in the telenovela Corazón Salvaje (2009-2010) starring Eduardo Yáñez and Aracely Arámbula. Bésame was also featured in the telenovela Triunfo del Amor (2010-2011).

== Background ==
On May 9, 2006, the group released their debut album, Todo Cambió, which reached number-one on both the Billboard Latin Albums and Billboard Latin Pop Albums charts. The album was certified Platinum (Latin) in the United States and 3× platinum in Mexico. For Dejarte de Amar, Mario Domm that "We worked very hard for this, the first album showed us the way, so we wanted to achieve something similar with the follow-up." Allegedly, Domm wrote "Mientes" and "Bésame" for Mexican singer Yuridia.

== Singles ==
"Mientes" (You Lie) was the lead single from the album. Released two months before the album, the single peaked at number-four on the Top Latin Songs chart. The single became the group's song to reach number-one on the Latin Pop Airplay chart, where it spent ten weeks on top. "Alejate de Mi" (Get Away from Me) was the second single from the album, released on April 12, 2010; it reached number-three on Top Latin Songs. The song became their second number-one single on the Latin Pop Airplay where it spent six weeks on top. The third single "Bésame" (Kiss Me), was released on July 12, 2010, where it peaked at number-nine on the Top Latin Songs and number-one on the Latin Pop Airplay. The music videos for "Mientes" and "Aléjate de Mi" were directed by Mario Domm and filmed in the Hyperlab Studios. The fourth single, "Entre Tus Alas", debuted at number thirty-three on the Latin Pop Songs chart.

== Critical reception ==
Professional ratings
Review scores
Source	Rating
Allmusic	3.5/5 stars
Billboard	(Favorable)

David Jeffries of Allmusic gave the album a three-half out of five stars who felt that the album arrangements were improved in comparison to the previous album. Jeffries also commented that the "heart-wrenching songs have evolved from a Maroon 5 size to a larger -- and arguably better -- sound that’s Coldplay big, filling the speakers with layers of strings, rock guitars, and full-bodied piano." Leila Cobo of Billboard gave the album a positive who felt it "continues the path that Camila crafted on its 2006 self-titled debut, but multiplied". At the 11th Latin Grammy Awards, the album received an award for "Best Pop Album by a Duo or Group" as well as a nomination for "Album of the Year which it lost to Juan Luis Guerra's A Son de Guerra. The single, "Mientes", received two Latin Grammies for "Record of the Year and Latin Grammy Award for Song of the Year. Domm responded by saying that "we wanted people to know that our first Latin Grammy wasn't an accident. We wanted them to know we're three people who give a lot of harmony to the universe; harmony that contrasts with the chaos of the world." Domm also thanked his mother for "putting up with so much noise" while the band recorded the album. In Mexico, the album won two "Oye! award for "Album of the Year" and "Album of the Year by Group". The album is currently a Lo Nuestro nominee for "Pop Album of the Year".

=== Accolades ===
Year	Ceremony	Award	Nominated	Result
2010	Latin Grammy	Record of the Year	"Mientes"	Won
2010	Latin Grammy	Song of the Year	"Mientes"	Won
2010	Latin Grammy	Album of the Year	Dejarte de Amar	Nominated
2010	Latin Grammy	Best Pop Album by a Duo or Group	Dejarte de Amar	Won
2010	Premios Oye!	Album of the Year	Dejarte de Amar	Won
2010	Premios Oye!	Album of the Year by Group	Dejarte de Amar	Won
2011	Premios Juventud	Best Ballad	"Aléjate de Mi"	Won
2011	Premios Juventud	Best Ballad	"Bésame"	Nominated
2011	Premio Lo Nuestro	Album of the Year	Dejarte de Amar	Won
2011	Premio Lo Nuestro	Song of the Year	"Mientes"	Won

== Commercial performance ==
In the United States, Dejarte de Amar debuted at number-one on the Billboard Top Latin Albums and Latin Pop Albums chart., On the Top Latin Albums chart, the album spent two weeks at number-one and eight nonconsecutive weeks at number-one at the Latin Pop Albums chart. The album also charted on the Billboard 200 where it peaked at number sixty-four. The album certified "Disco Platino" for sales of 100,000 copies in the United States. In Mexico the album has spent eight weeks at number-one and 82 weeks within the top ten. The album was certified Diamond, 2× Platinum and Gold by AMPROFON for sales of 450,000 copies. In Argentina, the album peaked at number-eight and number twenty-seven in Spain.,

== Track listing ==
No.	Title	Writer(s)	Length
1.	"Mientes"	Mario Domm · Mónica Vélez	3:25
2.	"Entre Tus Alas"	Mario Domm · Paulyna Carraz	4:06
3.	"Bésame"	Mario Domm · Monica Vélez	4:13
4.	"Maya"	Mario Domm · Mónica Vélez	2:57
5.	"Dejarte de Amar"	Mario Domm · Mónica Vélez · Xuan Long	3:36
6.	"Aléjate de Mí"	Mario Domm	4:18
7.	"Me Voy"	Pablo Hurtado	3:39
8.	"Nada"	Mario Domm · Mónica Vélez	2:56
9.	"¿De Qué Me Sirve La Vida?"	Samo	4:08
10.	"Restos de Abril"	Mario Domm · Mónica Vélez	3:58
11.	"De Mí"	Mario Domm	4:41

== Personnel ==
Adapted from Allmusic.

=== Performers ===
- Ken Yerke - Concert Master
- Denyse Buffum - Viola
- Alma Fernández - Viola
- Stefanie Fife - Cello
- Samuel Formicola - Viola
- Maurice Grants - Cello
- Rudolph Stein - Cello
- Marielos Labias - Coros
- Bárbara Muñóz - Coros
- Natalia Sosa - Coros
- David Stenske Viola
- Rubén Pérez - Ocarina
- Miguel Martínez - Cello
- Jeanie Lim - Viola
- Carole Kleister-Castillo - Viola
- Mario Domm Arreglos, Coros, Dirigida, Group Member, Piano
- Samo Arreglos, Coros, Group Member

=== Technical ===
- Paul Forat - A&R
- Emmanuel Garduño - Arreglos
- Édgar "Chicarcas" Hernández - Guitar Technician
- Pablo Hurtado - Arreglos, Dirigida, Group Member
- Paul Jamieson - Drum Technician
- Suzie Katayama - String Contractor
- Peter Mokran - Mezcla
- Rodrigo Ortega - Arreglos, Bateria
- Paco Pérez - Sintetizador
- Toño Dehesa Sánchez - Guitar Technician
- Rosino Serrano - Arreglos

== Charts ==
=== Weekly charts ===
Chart (2010)	Peak position
Argentinian Albums (CAPIF)	8
Mexican Albums (AMPROFON)	1
Spanish Albums (Promusicae)	27
US Billboard 200	64
US Top Latin Albums (Billboard)	1
US Latin Pop Albums (Billboard)	1
Venezuelan Albums (Recordland)	1

=== Year-end charts ===
Chart (2010)	Position
US Top Latin Albums (Billboard)	4
Chart (2011)	Position
US Top Latin Albums (Billboard)	7
Chart (2012)	Position
US Top Latin Albums (Billboard)	13

=== Certifications ===
Region	Certification	Certified units/sales
Central America (CFC)	Platinum	10,000
Mexico (AMPROFON)	2× Diamond+3× Platinum	780,000^{‡}
United States (RIAA)	Platinum (Latin)	100,000^{^}
^{^} Shipments figures based on certification alone.^{‡} Sales+streaming figures based on certification alone.

== See also ==
- List of number-one albums of 2010 (Mexico)
- List of number-one Billboard Latin Albums of 2010
- List of number-one Billboard Latin Pop Albums of 2010

== Release history ==
Region	Date	Label
United States	February 9, 2010	Sony Music Latin
