= Aléjate de mí =

"Aléjate de Mí"

Single by Camila

from the album Dejarte de Amar
- Released: April 9, 2010
- Recorded: 2009
- Genre: Latin pop
- Length: 4:19
- Label: Sony Music Latin
- Songwriter: Mario Domm
- Producer: Mario Domm

Camila singles chronology
"Mientes" (2009)	"Aléjate de Mí" (2010)	"Bésame" (2010)

Alternative covers
- iTunes promo cover

"Aléjate de Mí" (English: Get Away From Me) is a pop/rock ballad song by Mexican pop/rock group Camila released as the second single from their second studio album, Dejarte de Amar released officially on April 9, 2010, through Sony Music Latin. The song is also their third Mexican number-one single.

== Background and release ==
The song is written and produced by Mario Domm. The song was released as the last promotional single, before to release the album on February 1, 2010, and later selected as second single. The music video was released on May 12, 2010, directed by Ricardo Calderón, was also released for sale on May 31, 2010. The song was used as the lead theme of the protagonists Pilar and Gonzalo in the Chilean TV series La familia de al lado aired by TVN (Chile) in 2010–2011.

== Awards ==
Year	Ceremony	Award	Result
2011	Premios Juventud	Canción Corta-Venas	Won

== Versions ==
Claudia Leitte recorded a live version of the song call "Afaste-se de mim" for her 2012 album Negalora: Íntimo.

== Charts ==
Chart (2010)	Peak position
Mexican Singles Chart	1
US Hot Latin Songs	3
US Latin Tropical Songs	20

=== Year-end charts ===
Chart (2010)	Position
US Latin Songs Year End 2010	23
US Latin Pop Songs Year End 2010	7

=== Certifications ===
Region	Certification	Certified units/sales
Mexico (AMPROFON)	2× Diamond+Platinum+Gold	690,000^{‡}
^{‡} Sales+streaming figures based on certification alone.

== Release history ==
Region	Date	Format	Label
United States	February 1, 2010	Digital download (iTunes promo release only)	Sony
Mexico	May 3, 2010	Digital download (Official release)	Sony

== See also ==
- List of number-one songs of 2010 (Mexico)
