= Se Me Va la Voz =

Single by Alejandro Fernández

from the album Dos Mundos: Evolucion
- Released: October 5, 2009
- Recorded: 2009
- Genre: Latin pop
- Length: 4:00
- Songwriter: Roy Tavaré
- Producer: Áureo Baqueiro

Alejandro Fernández singles chronology
"Estuve" (2009)	"Se Me Va la Voz" (2009)	"Me Hace Tanto Bien" (2010)

Tito el Bambino singles chronology
"Mi Cama Huele a Ti" (2009)	"Se Me Va la Voz (Remix)" (2009)	"Feliz Navidad" (2010)

Hector Acosta "el Torito" singles chronology
"Tu Primera Vez" (2009)	"Se Me Va la Voz (Bachata version)" (2009)	"No Me Lloren" (2010)

"Se Me Va la Voz" (English: Losing My Voice) is a Spanish language song by Mexican singer Alejandro Fernández released as the lead single from his seventh studio album, Dos Mundos: Evolucion. The music video of the song was released on YouTube in December 2009. The song reached number-one on February 6 on the Billboard Hot Latin songs chart.

== Song information ==
The song was written by Roy Tavaré and produced by Áureo Baqueiro, whom Alejandro has worked with in the past with his two previous albums. It was released on December 8 in physical, mobile and digital formats. The song was released simultaneously with the single "Estuve" from "Dos Mundos: Tradicion".

== Music video ==
Fernandez singing while his on-screen ex-girlfriend and her boyfriend are on the back.

The video was produced and directed by Gustavo Garzón. It is a continuation of "Estuve", where the story of a love triangle emphasizes the concept of karma, where each action has a reaction, its own effect equal or worse in magnitude, and this video entails the consequences of the betrayal. The final result is a video that narrates two stories in a different time. The videos had the participation of the Puerto Rican actor Luis Roberto Guzmán and Mexican actress Aislinn Derbez, who gives life to Alejandro's woman according to the script. Adriana Ontiveros, a model from Jalisco also participated in the video.

The state of Jalisco served as the set for the two videos. The first day was filmed in a Hacienda located 30 minutes from Guadalajara, hidden between nature and panoramic views to the ‘barranca of Hentitan’, birthplace of Don Vicente Fernández, Alejandro's father. Other shots were filmed in the city; in a very modern residence, a night club and in the streets of ‘la perla tapatia’.

To shoot the videos, a High Definition Red One edition camera was used. The total duration for filming both videos was for more than 50 hours, with the staff support of 85 people approximately. Over a period of two days of filming more than 100 extras participated all natives of Guadalajara and the collaboration of 30 elements of security including, an ambulance, a crane, and several patrol cars. Pre-production, filming and post-production of both videos would take more than four weeks to finalize, including: editing, color correction and the review of all the details.

== Track listing ==
- CD Single
1. "Se Me Va la Voz" [Album Version] - 4:00

== Covers ==
- "Se Me Va la Voz" (Remix) feat. Tito El Bambino
- "Se Me Va la Voz" (Bachata Version) feat. Hector Acosta "el Torito"

== Chart performance ==
Chart (2009)	Peak position
Spanish Singles Chart	10
U.S. Billboard Hot Latin Songs	1
U.S. Billboard Tropical Songs	1
Venezuelan Singles Chart	8

== Release history ==
Region	Date	Format	Label
United States	December 9, 2009	Radio impact	Universal Music Latino
Worldwide	October 20, 2009	Digital download	Universal Music Latino
Mexico	October 5, 2009	Digital download	Fonovisa
