= Mario Domm =

Mexican singer and songwriter

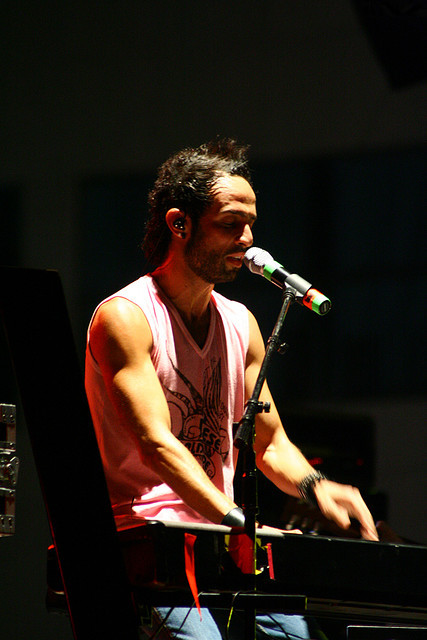

Background information
- Born: Mario Alberto Domínguez Zarzar; 22 January 1977 (age 49)
- Origin: Torreón, Coahuila, Mexico
- Genres: Latin; soul; pop
- Occupations: Singer; songwriter; record producer
- Instruments: Vocals; piano; drums; guitar; bass
- Years active: 1993–present
- Label: Sony Latin
- Member of: Camila
- Website: www.camila.tv

Mario Alberto Domínguez Zarzar (born 22 January 1977), known as Mario Domm, is a Mexican singer, songwriter and record producer. A founding member of the pop rock band Camila, he has won four Latin Grammy Awards; four Billboard Awards; 11 Premios Lo Nuestro; 14 SACM awards; five Juventud Awards, five Telehit awards, four MTV Awards, eight ASCAP Awards, three Gaviotas de Plata Awards and three Gaviotas de Oro Awards, seven Monitor Latino Awards, two Los 40 Principales Awards, one Orgullosamente Latino Award, and a recognition as a musical genius by Telehit.

During his career, Domm has placed 14 singles at the top position of the Mexican charts as well as on other countries.

Domm has sold more than three million records, more than four million tickets and has given more than 500 concerts in 21 countries in America, Europe and Asia.

The Elypse Tour is one of the most extensive tours a Latin artist has done in the United States.

Domm has collaborated with the likes of Marco Antonio Solís, Alejandro Sanz, Alejandro Fernández, Wisin, Kenny G, Abraham Mateo, Julio Iglesias, Ricky Martin, Romeo Santos, Fito Páez, Rosana, Colbie Caillat, Pepe Aguilar, Alejandra Guzmán, Thalía, Jesse & Joy, Sin Bandera, Reik, Reyli, Kalimba, The Sacados, Carlos Rivera, Alessandra Amoroso, Wanessa Camargo, and OV7.

== Biography ==
He was born in Torreón, where he grew up and spent his adolescence. At age 17, he moved to Mexico City where he undertook his musical studies. He studied at Mexico's National Music School (singing, piano, music theory and harmony) in 2002 he signed his first record contract with Sony Music Mexico where he released his first solo record called Mexi-Funky-Music.

He continued his career as singer and composer and produced successful records by the like of Kalimba, Aerosoul; and Reyli Barba, Reily en la luna.

Produced popular songs such as "Desde que Llegate "(main theme from the movie Ladies Night) with vocals from Reyli Barba and "Si tu no estas aqui" by Sin Bandera.

He returned to the musical scene in 2006 with the pop rock group Camila, formed by Pablo Hurtado and Samo with whom he recorded 2 records:

Todo Cambió, produced by Mario was one of the most important releases of 2006. That same year he was awarded with the Exito SACM award for the song "Tocando Fondo" as one of the most listened songs in 2005 sang by Kalimba. And Camila was nominated for a Grammy for the Single "Todo Cambió".

In 2007 the songs "Coleccionista de canciones" & "Quiero estar Contigo" also received an Exito SACM Award. In 2008 another two songs composed by Mario: "Todo Cambió" and "Solo para Ti" from the Todo Cambió album, received the same award

In 2009 he received another Éxito SACM Award for the song "Yo Quiero" and in 2009 another one for "Causa y Efecto" co-written by Mónica Velez). sang by Paulina Rubio.

In 2009 the first single for their second album, Dejarte de Amar (released in 2010) is released; the song "Mientes" immediately reached the top of the radio charts national and internationally giving Mario in the years 2010-2011, a number of awards and recognitions as a composer, singer and producer.

In 2014 Camila released their third record titled Elypse, transforming themselves from a Trio to a Duo. Today Mario Domm and Pablo Hurtado the only members of Camila.

== Outstanding awards and achievements with Camila ==
In 2010, Dejarte Amar was the Highest Selling Album in Mexico; selling more than any other record in any language that year (top 10 Amprofon).Dejarte Amar earned a Diamond Record for selling more than 300,000 copies.

Further, in Mexico the album has spent eight weeks at number-one and 70 non-consecutive weeks within the top ten. At the Latin Grammy Awards of 2010, the band earned three awards, Record of the Year and Song of the Year for the song "Mientes" and Best Pop Vocal Album by a Group.

Since her first three releases, Camila has sold more than 3 million records and has had nearly 500 shows in 21 countries (during three tours with each record in America, Europe, Asia).

The Elypse Tour has been one of the most extensive for a Latin American artist.

In 2012 they sold out Foro Sol in a memorable concert; during that tour they sold after out multiple shows in the main venues in Mexico (Auditorio Nacional, Palacio de los Deportes, Guadalajara's Teatro Telmex and Arena Monterrey).

Multiple platinum and Gold Awards in Mexico, Latin America and United States.

4 Latin American Grammy Awards: including Best album, Song of the year and Record of the year and Best Contemporary Pop vocal Record.

4 Latin Billboard Award: Top Latin Albums – Artist Of The Year, Latin Pop Airplay – Artist of the Year, Latin Pop Album Duo or Group and Latin Pop Song of the year "Decidiste Dejarme".

2 Los 40 Principales Awards (Spain) Best Mexican Group and Best song "Mientes".

7 Monitor Latino Awards: Album Of The Year, Hot Song Of The Year "Mientes" Album group of the year, Song of the Year, Group of the Year, Composer of the Year, Camila was the most awarded artist by Monitor Latino band of the year.

Two Telehit Awards: Best Pop Group and Best Song "Mientes".

1 Orgullosamente Latino Award (Ritmosón Latino): Group of the Year.2 Oye Awards: Album of the Year and Group of the Year.

3 Lo Nuestro Awards Best Album Pop: Best Song "Mientes" and Best pop Group.

Juventud Awards: Best Melodramatic Song "Mientes".

== Elypse ==
4 nominations to Latin Grammy Awards for Elypse: Recording of the Year for the song "Decidiste Dejarme"; Album of the Year Elypse Song of the Year "Decidiste Dejarme"; Best contemporary vocal Pop Album Elypse.

Won Latin Grammy for Best Contemporary Vocal Pop album Elypse.

2015 for the Grammy Awards – Best Latin Album.

Nominated for Lo Nuestro Awards 2015: Pop Rock Duo or Group of the year; Pop Song of the Year "Decidiste Dejarme".

Won Lo Nuestro Awards 2015 Duo Or Group of the Year.

Nominated for the 2015 Billboard Awards: Latin Pop Song of the year "Decidiste Dejarme"; Duo or Group artist of the Year; Latin Pop Album of the Year.

Won 2015 Billboard Award: Latin Pop Song of the Year "Decidiste Dejarme".

Won Juventud Award Best Melodramatic Song with "Perdon".

Won Billboard 2015 en la categoría Latin Pop Song del Año "Decidiste Dejarme".

Won 2015 Latin American Music Awards: favorite pop or rock duo or Group.

Nominated Latin Grammy Awards 2015 for Recording of the Year for the song "La Vida Entera FT. Marco Antonio Solis".

- More than 1.77M subscribers on VEVO@YT
- More than 1,461Million views on VEVO@YT
- More than 9.4 million fans on Facebook.
- More than 3.42 million Followers on Twitter.
- More than 393k Followers on Instagram

== Discography ==
=== As a solo artist ===
- Mexi-Funky-Music (2002)

=== With Camila ===
- Todo Cambió (2006)
- Dejarte de Amar (2010)
- Elypse (2014)
- Hacia adentro (2019)
