= Camila (band) =

Mexican band

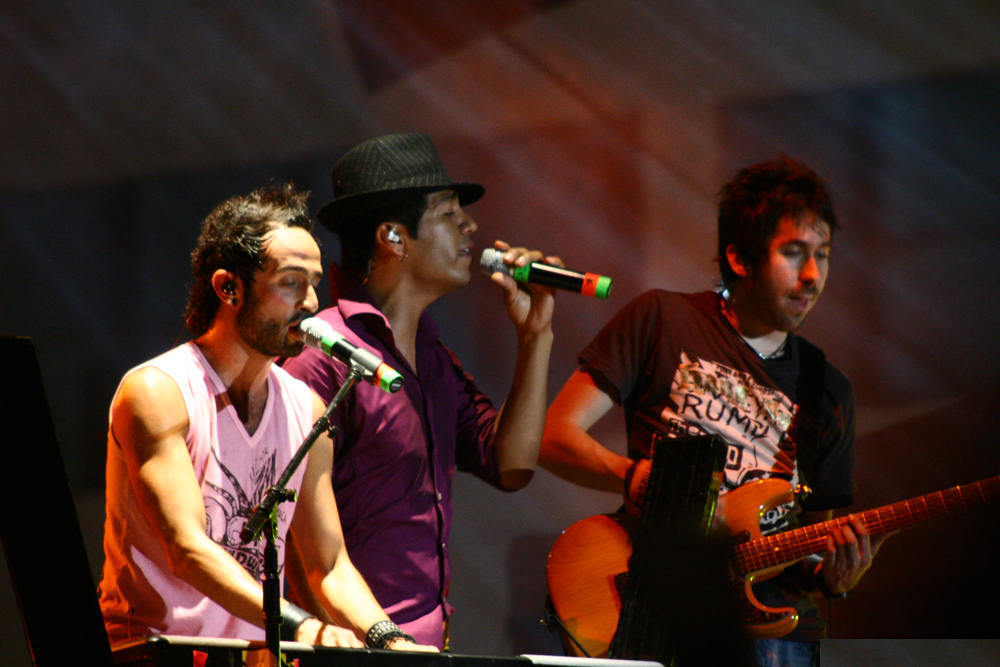
- Camila during the 3er Festival de la Música Latina in Managua in 2007

Background information
- Origin: Mexico City, Mexico
- Genres: Latin pop; pop rock; rock en español
- Years active: 2005–present
- Label: Sony Latin
- Members: Mario Domm; Pablo Hurtado; Samuel "Samo" Parra

Camila is a Mexican pop rock group formed in 2005 by Mario Domm, Pablo Hurtado and Samuel "Samo" Parra.

== Biographies ==
Founded by the award-winning composer, singer and producer Mario Domm (Coahuila, Mexico), Camila made its official debut in 2005 when Domm signed his first record contract with Sony BMG Norte, together with his friends and colleagues guitarist Pablo Hurtado (San Luis Potosí) and Veracruz native Samo. Camila made Todo Cambió (2006) and Dejarte de amar (2010), which gained them success in Latin America.

Songs like “Abrázame,” “Coleccionista de canciones,” “Todo cambió,” “Mientes,” “Aléjate de mí” and “Bésame,” have gained them three Latin Grammy Awards, three Billboard Awards, Diamond and Platinum certifications, and more than two million albums sold worldwide.

Additionally, they have performed in major venues, such as New York's and Los Angeles’ NOKIA, El Coliseo in Puerto Rico, in Barquisimeto, Venezuela (a concert with a hundred thousand people in attendance), el Gran Rex de Buenos Aires, Argentina and Viña del Mar, Chile, and Mexico. The band has also worked with international stars, such as Colbie Caillat, Kenny G, Alejandro Sanz, Alejandra Guzman, Reyli, Chambao, Aleks Syntek, and Wanessa Camargo.

In 2014, Camila launched a third studio album, Elypse. It was the first album released as a duo since Samo left the group. “Decidiste dejarme,” was the leading single for the album.

Their fourth studio album, Hacia adentro, was released in 2019.

On March 31, 2023, the band released their single "Fugitivos". This is their first material to feature Samo since their second album Dejarte de Amar.

== Band members ==
=== Mario Domm ===
Composer, singer, and producer born in Torreon, Coahuila, Mario Domm commands multiple musical instruments, such as: drums, piano, guitar, and bass.

He has worked with artists Alejandro Sanz, Taboo (of the Black Eyed Peas), Alejandra Guzmán, Kalimba, Reyli, Sin Bandera, Rosana, Jesse and Joy, Romeo, Alejandro Fernández and Thalía.

Domm lives in Los Angeles, California, where he works in his own recording studio named Pop The Cherry Studios.

=== Pablo Hurtado ===
Guitarist and co-producer of Camila, Pablo Hurtado joined the project shortly before graduating in music production and audio engineer at the Fermatta Music School. He was born in Mexico City and grew up in San Luis Potosí in a family with artistic sensibilities.

He began playing the piano at the age of five and when he turned seven his father introduced him to classical guitar. As a teenager he tried the electric guitar. He began to play with several rock bands, and later became interested in musical theatre and progressive music. At the age of 20, he returned to Mexico City and began his audio engineering studies, which opened his mind to other musical genres such as jazz, blues, funk and pop.

At present, sponsored by the guitar brand PRS, Pablo has acquired knowledge and refinement and shows a fresh perspective whether playing acoustic music or intricate solos, sweet ballads or daring ones. He is the co-author of several songs in all three of Camila's albums (“Todo cambió”, “Dejarte de amar”, “Elypse”), which has allowed him to come in contact with giants of world music. He lives in Los Angeles, California, where he has his own recording studio, Cypress Overdrive Studios.

=== Samuel "Samo" Parra ===
Choir member at a church from the time he was five-years-old, Samo saw how each Sunday that space of Veracruz transformed into his very own Auditorio Nacional. Pushed by his parents and siblings, he later aimed to become an opera singer, and finally was recognized as one of the 100 Best Voices of Mexico in a talent contest. As such he arrived in DF. He was back-up singer for artists like Reyli, which he met Mario Domm through. Presently he is vocal figure and he is evolving as a composer:

“My career as an author is on the rise,” he explains, “The first tracks I have ever coauthored have been professionally recorder with Camila, yet there are other singers that are recording my songs. The fact that Ednita Nazario in Puerto Rico and the United States; and Diego Schoening in Mexico selected tracks that I wrote, not only for the repertoire of each of their latest albums, but also that as first singles, they have had a favorable response from the public, gives me the clear proof that I am doing things right. Also, the fact that Gloria Trevi, Christian Chávez and Yuri worked with me to choose songs written by me is another indication that I have all the talent to become a more well rounded artist for the public."

In 2013 was separated from the band to form his solo career, he would return to record clarifying the fourth single from the band.

== Discography ==
- 2006: Todo Cambió
- 2010: Dejarte de Amar
- 2014: Elypse
- 2019: Hacia Adentro
- 2024: Regresa
