= List of top 20 songs for 2011 in Mexico =

This is a list of the General Top 20 songs of 2011 in Mexico according to Monitor Latino. Monitor Latino also issued separate year-end charts for Regional Mexican, Pop and Anglo songs.

№	Title	Artist(s)
1	"Golpes en el corazón"	Los Tigres del Norte & Paulina Rubio
2	"Nada iguales"	La Adictiva Banda San José de Mesillas
3	"El tierno se fue"	Calibre 50
4	"Entre tus alas"	Camila
5	"Día de suerte"	Alejandra Guzmán
6	"Vestida de azúcar"	Gloria Trevi
7	"The Time (Dirty Bit)"	Black Eyed Peas
8	"Dí que regresarás"	La Original Banda El Limón
9	"A partir de hoy"	Maite Perroni & Marco Di Mauro
10	"Tan sólo tú"	Franco De Vita & Alejandra Guzmán
11	"Rabiosa"	Shakira
12	"Sale el sol"	Shakira
13	"Olvídame"	Julión Álvarez y su Norteño Banda
14	"On the Floor"	Jennifer López ft. Pitbull
15	"Me río de tí"	Gloria Trevi
16	"Impermeable"	Ha*Ash
17	"Te dejo en libertad"	Ha*Ash
18	"Te miré partir"	Conjunto Primavera
19	"Peligro"	Reik
20	"Al fin te encontré"	Río Roma

== See also ==
- List of number-one songs of 2011 (Mexico)
- List of number-one albums of 2011 (Mexico)
