= Amore Mio =

Amore mio (Italian "my love") may refer to:

- Amore Mio (album), a 2014 album by Thalía
- "Amore Mio" (song), by Thalía from Amore Mio, 2015
- "Amore mio", song by Mina from Del mio meglio n. 3, 1975
- "Amore mio", song by Umberto Balsamo, 1973
- "Amore mio", song by Enzo Malepasso, 1981
- "Do Lafzon Ki Kahani" or "Amore Mio", a song by R. D. Burman, Asha Bhosle and Sharad Kumar Bader from the 1979 Indian film The Great Gambler

== See also ==
- Amore (disambiguation)
- Amor mío (disambiguation)
