= Sólo Parecía Amor =

Single by Thalía

from the album Amore Mío
- Released: April 14, 2015
- Recorded: 2014
- Genre: Latin pop
- Length: 4:27
- Label: Sony Music Latin
- Songwriters: José Luis Ortega, Armando Ávila
- Producer: Armando Avila

Thalía singles chronology
| "Como Tú No Hay Dos" (2015) | "Sólo Parecía Amor" (2015) | "Si Alguna Vez" (2015) |

Music video
- "Sólo Parecía Amor" on YouTube

"Sólo Parecía Amor" (English: It Only Seemed Like Love) is a song by Mexican singer-songwriter Thalía from her twelfth studio album Amore Mío (2014). The song was written by José Luis Ortega and Armando Avila and produced by Armando Avila. It was released by Sony Music Latin as the third single from the album in the Mexican territory and fourth overall on April 14, 2015.

== Release and reception ==
On February 20, 2015 Thalía announced on her social media that she was on her way to film the music video for the song. The song was released as an official single on April 14, 2015. The song debuted in Mexico's general airplay chart, gaining moderate success. In the pop chart, published by Monitor Latino, the song peaked at #1.

== Music video ==
The official video for the song was released on Thalía's official YouTube channel on April 28, 2015. The video shows Thalía in different rooms reflecting on a failed relationship.

== Charts ==
| Chart (2015) | Peak position |
|---|---|
| Mexico (Billboard Mexican Airplay) | 28 |
| Mexico (Billboard Espanol Airplay) | 5 |
| Mexico Pop (Monitor Latino) | 1 |

== Awards and nominations ==
The song was nominated for Best Pop Video at the 2015 Quiero Awards.

| Year | Awards Ceremony | Category | Result |
|---|---|---|---|
| 2015 | Quiero Awards | Best Pop Video | Nominated |
