= Por Lo Que Reste De Vida =

"Por Lo Que Reste de Vida"

Single by Thalía

from the album Amore Mío
- Released: September 9, 2014
- Recorded: 2014
- Genre: Latin pop
- Length: 3:38
- Label: Sony Music Latin
- Songwriter: Ricky Montaner
- Producer: Armando Avila

Thalía singles chronology
| "Sino a Ti" (2014) | "Por Lo Que Reste de Vida" (2014) | "Amore Mio" (2015) |

"Por Lo Que Reste de Vida" (English: For What's Left Of Life) is a song by Mexican singer-songwriter Thalía from her twelfth studio album Amore Mío (2014). The song was written by Ricky Montaner and produced by Armando Avila and was released by Sony Music Latin as the lead single from the album on September 9, 2014. A bachata version of the song was released to digital download on October 14, 2014. "Por Lo Que Reste de Vida" is a Latin pop ballad that lyrically talks about unconditional and everlasting love.

Upon its release, "Por Lo Que Reste de Vida" received generally favorable reviews from music critics, who considered the song an "all-out pop anthem" with simple but lovely lyrics. The song attained success on the charts, reaching the top-three on both Dominican Republic and Mexico charts, while reaching moderate impact on the US Hot Latin Songs and Latin Pop Airplay charts. A music video for the song was released on October 14, 2014, and it tells a tale about an eternal and immortal love.

== Background and release ==
After releasing the successful Habítame Siempre (2012), her eleventh studio album, which was certified 3× platinum, becoming her first album since Arrasando (2000) to receive a platinum certification in Mexico, Thalía embarked on her Viva! Tour (2013) and later released its live album the same year. In 2014, she released first children's album, "Viva Kids", and while promoting it, she confirmed she was recording her twelfth studio album, stating that, "I'm actively writing, co-writing, producing and co-producing. I'm doing everything. This album, I find, is a little bit more sexy."

Thalía also revealed that the album's first single would be released by the end of 2014, and the album at the beginning of 2015. On September 9, 2014, Sony Music Latin released "Por Lo Que Reste de Vida" as the album's first single via digital download through iTunes and Amazon. The same day the song's audio was also uploaded to Thalía's VEVO account on YouTube. The song reached the number one spot on the iTunes charts in Mexico in less than 24 hours. A bachata version of "Por Lo Que Reste de Vida" was released on October 14, 2015.

== Composition and lyrics ==
"Por Lo Que Reste de Vida" was written by Ricky Montaner; son of the Venezuelan singer Ricardo Montaner, whom Thalía paid homage with the cover of his song “Bésame” on Habítame Siempre (2012). Mexican producer Armando Ávila produced the track; Ávila worked secretly with Thalía during a year and a half on the production of "Amore Mio". The song starts with a spare arrangement with voice and piano, being followed by musical drama, with the track quickly crescendos to a passionate, full-band climax. Lyrically, "Por Lo Que Reste de Vida" talks about unconditional love and surrendering to someone in the most romantic way, with the promise of having an everlasting love. According to Thalía, "Ever since they presented me the song, I fell in love completely for IT and knew I had to sing it and bring it to life. We have to live passionately, totally devoted to love."

== Critical reception ==
"Por Lo Que Reste de Vida" received generally favorable reviews from music critics. While reviewing Amore Mio, Thom Jurek of Allmusic picked the song among the album's best tracks, calling it "an all-out pop anthem." Ryan Buck of Music Times called it "elegant", writing that it has "our attention and we can understand the message without a translation." Lety Zárate of Monitor Latino called its poetry "simple, but very passionate," while Judy Cantor-Navas of Rhapsody noted that the song "spotlights a stripped-down Thalia." Janet Madrigal Béjar of Esmas wrote that the song is "undoubtedly one of the standout tracks of the album."

== Track listings ==
- Digital download
1. "Por Lo Que Reste de Vida" – 3:38
- Bachata version digital download
1. "Por Lo Que Reste de Vida" – 3:38

== Charts ==
=== Weekly charts ===
| Chart (2014) | Peak position |
|---|---|
| Colombia Pop (Monitor Latino) | 9 |
| Dominican Republic Pop (Monitor Latino) | 3 |
| Mexico (Billboard Mexican Airplay) | 9 |
| Mexico (Billboard Espanol Airplay) | 2 |
| US Hot Latin Songs (Billboard) | 50 |
| US Latin Airplay (Billboard) | 49 |
| US Latin Pop Airplay (Billboard) | 19 |
| US Latin Tropical Airplay (Billboard) | 18 |

=== Year-end charts ===
| Chart (2015) | Position |
|---|---|
| Colombia Pop (Monitor Latino) | 18 |
| Dominican Republic Pop (Monitor Latino) | 15 |
