= Como tú no hay dos =

Como tú no hay dos may refer to:

- Como tú no hay 2, a 2020 Spanish-language TV series originally written as Como tú no hay dos
- "Como tú no hay dos" (song), a 2015 single by Thalía and Becky G
- "Como tú no hay dos", a song by Proyecto Uno
