= Sale el Sol (song) =

Single by Shakira

from the album Sale el Sol
- Released: 4 January 2011
- Studio: Rodeo Recordings (New York, NY); Electric Lady Studios (New York, NY); Sonic Projects Studios (Miami, FL); Aurha Studios (Barcelona, Spain)
- Genre: Alternative rock
- Length: 3:20
- Label: Epic; Sony Music Latin
- Composers: Shakira; Luis Fernando Ochoa
- Lyricist: Shakira
- Producers: Shakira; Luis Fernando Ochoa

Shakira singles chronology
"Loca" (2010)	"Sale el Sol" (2011)	"Rabiosa" (2011)

Music video
- "Sale el Sol" on YouTube

"Sale el Sol" (English: "The Sun Comes Out", Spanish: [ˌsa.le el ˈsol]) is a song by Colombian singer-songwriter Shakira for her ninth studio album of the same name. The song was written and produced by the singer and her frequent collaborator Luis Fernando Ochoa and belongs to the "very rock and roll" direction of the album. Musically, "Sale el Sol" is a folk and Latin music-influenced alternative rock track. Its lyrics encourage one to be optimistic during difficult times. Epic Records released "Sale el Sol" as the second single from the album on 4 January 2011.

Critical reception towards the song was positive, with many critics praising its composition and placement as the opening track of the album. Although it appeared on only a few record charts, "Sale el Sol" performed well in Mexico and Spain, peaking at numbers one and eight on the Monitor Latino and Spanish Singles Chart, respectively. It was certified gold in both the countries. In the United States, it reached number ten on the Billboard Hot Latin Songs chart.

An accompanying music video for "Sale el Sol" was directed by Jaume de Laiguana, and features Shakira and her band performing the song in a snow-decked forest. Spanish Cava wine producer Freixenet used the video as their Christmas season commercial. "Sale el Sol" was also included on the set list of The Sun Comes Out World Tour in 2010 and 2011. At the Rock in Rio concert show in May 2010, Shakira sang the song as a tribute to Argentine singer-songwriter Gustavo Cerati, who had fallen into a coma earlier that month.

== Background and composition ==
Shakira "Sale el Sol" 2010
18 second sample of the alternative rock song's chorus, highlighting its guitar instrumentation.

In 2010, Shakira began work on ninth studio album Sale el Sol. The singer split the album into three musical "directions," one of which is "very rock and roll." Shakira, who was a rock artist at the beginning of her career but later took on a more pop-influenced approach, said it had been "fun to re-encounter that side of my artistic personality." The title track is an alternative rock song, with additional influences of folk and Latin music. Written and produced by Shakira and her frequent collaborator Luis Fernando Ochoa, "Sale el Sol" is a call for "optimism through difficult times." The words "Sale el Sol" are Spanish for "The Sun Comes Out," and Shakira explained why she chose the motif of the rise of the sun, saying:

"I was a little bit down at the end of last year, but as soon as this year started, the sun started shining for me. I find myself smiling more often, I feel more free and liberated. You go through difficult moments, everybody does, but there's always the sun inside of us that never extinguishes, and it has come out for me. And, hopefully, it will be a long day in the sun."

== Release and reception ==
=== Commercial performance ===
"Sale el Sol" was globally released as the second single from the album on 4 January 2011. The song was made available for digitally downloading on the iTunes Store on the same day. It was a moderate commercial success, performing well in Latin American countries. It reached number one on the Monitor Latino airplay chart in Mexico. The Asociación Mexicana de Productores de Fonogramas y Videogramas (AMPROFON) certified "Sale el Sol" gold for shipping 30,000 units in the country. It debuted and peaked at number eight on the Spanish Singles Chart and charted for a total of 23 weeks. The Productores de Música de España (PROMUSICAE) too certified "Sale el Sol" gold for achieving sales of 20,000 units in Spain.

In the United States, "Sale el Sol" was a hit on the Latin Billboard charts. The song peaked at number ten on the Billboard Hot Latin Songs chart and appeared on it for 38 weeks in total. It was more successful on the airplay chart, peaking at number two on the Latin Pop Airplay chart.

=== Critical response ===
"Sale el Sol" received positive reviews from critics. Stephen Thomas Erlewine from AllMusic highlighted its rock influences and deemed it "anthemic." Billboard commended its lyrics, calling them "evocative and hopeful" and found it emotionally appealing, saying "Wistful and beautiful, it highlights a more pared-down Shakira." Jesus Yanez-Reyes from Northern Arizona News complimented Shakira's vocal delivery and songwriting, and felt the combination of rock and Latin music in the song made it "reminiscent" of Shakira's earlier work. Reyes also praised its placement as the opening track of the album and commented: "Undoubtedly, this song starts the album off on the right track, with only higher expectations to come." The instrumentation of the song reminded Carlos Macias from Terra Music of Shakira's work in her sixth studio album Fijación Oral, Vol. 1 (2005) and called it a "good welcome" to the album.

At the Premio Lo Nuestro awards ceremony in 2012, "Sale el Sol" was nominated for "Canción Pop del Año" ("Pop Song of the Year"), but lost to another song by Shakira, "Rabiosa".

== Promotion ==
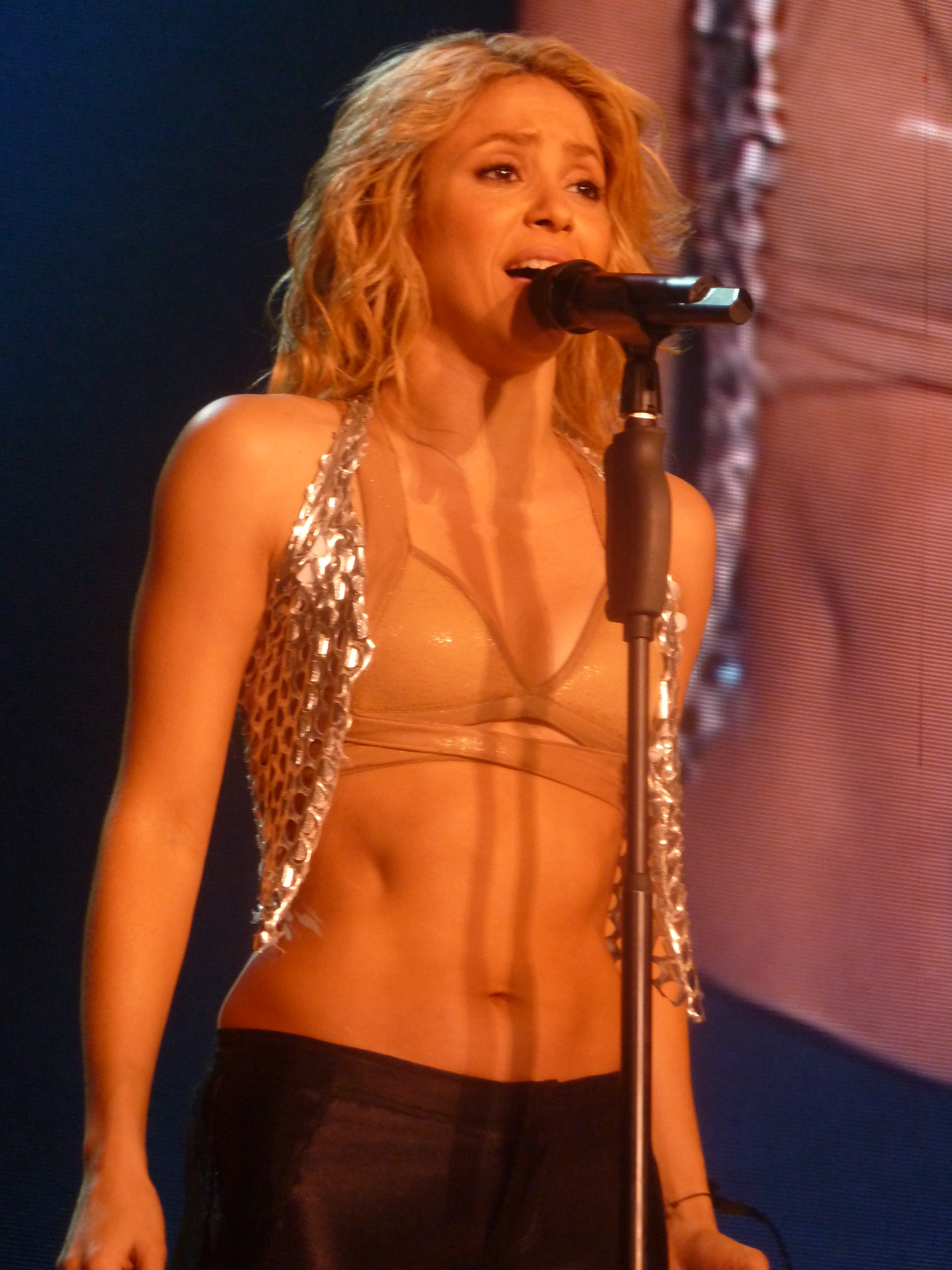
Shakira performing the song during The Sun Comes Out World Tour show in Paris, France

=== Music video ===
The accompanying music video for "Sale el Sol" was directed by Shakira's frequent collaborator Jaume de Laiguana. Parts of the video also served as a Christmas season commercial for Spanish Cava wine producer Freixenet, who donated an estimated amount of 500,000 euros to Shakira's charity Barefoot Foundation. The singer's official website announced the music video on 9 February 2011. It was made available to digitally download from the iTunes Store a day earlier.

It begins with the title of the song being shown on a black background, with a bright sun-like circle in place of the letter "o". Dressed in an entirely black attire, Shakira then appears singing the song with a mic stand in a snowy forest setting. She is backed by a four-piece band of musicians, who are also wearing black costumes. As the first chorus of the song ends, it start to snow. In a maze-like structure, Shakira is shown running in a large golden frock, trying to find her way. Changing back to the forest setting, the camera pans upward to reveal that the maze is built behind the wall in front of which Shakira and her band are performing. The song's bridge co-indices with the occurrence of a storm and culminates with Shakira tearing her top open, after which the sun rises and the intensity of the lighting increases. The video ends with Shakira opening a door that leads her out of the maze. Scenes from Laiguana's short documentary film Hagamos Que Salga el Sol (Let the Sun Rise), which was filmed in Colombia, are interspersed in the video.

Robbie Daw from Idolator called the music video "sunny" and commented: "What more do you want from a Shakira video than the sizzling hot singer in a beautiful frock, wandering through a long maze while making her way out of the cold and into the sun-drenched scenery."

=== Live performances ===
"Sale el Sol" was included as the thirteenth song on the set list of Shakira's The Sun Comes Out World Tour (2010–11). In May 2010, Shakira sang the song at the Rock in Rio concert show in Madrid, Spain, as a tribute to Argentine singer-songwriter Gustavo Cerati, her frequent-collaborator and close friend who had suffered a stroke earlier in the month and had fallen into a coma.

== Formats and track listing ==
- Digital download
1. "Sale el Sol" - 3:20

== Charts and certifications ==
=== Weekly charts ===
Chart (2011)	Peak position
Belgium (Ultratip Bubbling Under Wallonia)	15
Mexico (Monitor Latino)	1
Mexico (Mexico Airplay)	4
South Korea (Circle Chart)	90
Spain (PROMUSICAE)	8
US Hot Latin Songs (Billboard)	10
US Latin Pop Airplay (Billboard)	2

=== Year-end charts ===
Chart (2011)	Position
Spain (PROMUSICAE)	38
US Hot Latin Songs (Billboard)	54

=== Certifications ===
Region	Certification	Certified units/sales
Brazil (Pro-Música Brasil)	Gold	30,000^{‡}
Mexico (AMPROFON)	Gold	30,000^{*}
Spain (Promusicae)	Gold	20,000^{*}
United States (RIAA)	Platinum (Latin)	60,000^{‡}
^{*} Sales figures based on certification alone.^{‡} Sales+streaming figures based on certification alone.

== See also ==
- List of number-one songs of 2011 (Mexico)
