= List of number-one songs of 2011 (Mexico) =

This is a list of the Monitor Latino number-one songs of 2011. Chart rankings are based on airplay across radio states in Mexico utilizing the Radio Tracking Data, LLC in real time. Charts are ranked from Monday to Sunday. Besides the General chart, Monitor Latino published "Pop", "Regional Mexican" and "Anglo" charts.

== Chart history ==
=== General ===
In 2011, fourteen songs reached number one on the General chart. Of these, thirteen songs were entirely in Spanish, and only one was in English. Ten acts achieved their first number-one song in Mexico: Gloria Trevi, Alejandra Guzmán, La Adictiva Banda San José de Mesillas, Los Tigres del Norte, Reyli, Yuridia, Calibre 50, Maroon 5, Christina Aguilera and Jenni Rivera.

"Golpes en el corazón" by Los Tigres del Norte & Paulina Rubio was the longest-running General number-one of the year, staying at the top position for sixteen consecutive weeks, which remains the longest number of weeks that a song has stayed at #1 since the General chart was founded in 2007. (Note: In 2017, "Despacito" topped the General chart for 16 non-consecutive weeks. However, that is the combined number of weeks that two versions of the song led the chart: the original version by Luis Fonsi and Daddy Yankee topped the General chart for 7 weeks, and later the remix featuring Justin Bieber topped it for 9 weeks.) "Golpes en el corazón" was also the best-performing song of the year in Mexico according to Monitor Latino's Annual chart for 2011.

"Moves like Jagger" by Maroon 5 ft. Christina Aguilera was the first English-language song to reach #1 since the General chart was first published in 2007.

The yellow background indicates the best-performing song of 2011.

Issue date	Song	Artist(s)	Ref.
January 2	"Tú sabes quién"	Alejandro Fernández	
January 9	"Tú sabes quién"	Alejandro Fernández	
January 16	"Bésame"	Camila	
January 23	"Bésame"	Camila	
January 30	"Bésame"	Camila	
February 6	"Sale el sol"	Shakira	
February 13	"Sale el sol"	Shakira	
February 20	"Sale el sol"	Shakira	
February 27	"Sale el sol"	Shakira	
March 6	"Sale el sol"	Shakira	
March 13	"Me río de ti"	Gloria Trevi	
March 20	"Me río de ti"	Gloria Trevi	
March 27	"Me río de ti"	Gloria Trevi	
April 3	"Me río de ti"	Gloria Trevi	
April 10	"Me río de ti"	Gloria Trevi	
April 17	"Me río de ti"	Gloria Trevi	
April 24	"Me río de ti"	Gloria Trevi	
May 1	"Me río de ti"	Gloria Trevi	
May 8	"Día de suerte"	Alejandra Guzmán	
May 15	"Entre tus alas"	Camila	
May 22	"Nada iguales"	La Adictiva Banda San José de Mesillas	
May 29	"Golpes en el corazón"	Los Tigres del Norte & Paulina Rubio	
June 5	"Golpes en el corazón"	Los Tigres del Norte & Paulina Rubio	
June 12	"Golpes en el corazón"	Los Tigres del Norte & Paulina Rubio	
June 19	"Golpes en el corazón"	Los Tigres del Norte & Paulina Rubio	
June 26	"Golpes en el corazón"	Los Tigres del Norte & Paulina Rubio	
July 3	"Golpes en el corazón"	Los Tigres del Norte & Paulina Rubio	
July 10	"Golpes en el corazón"	Los Tigres del Norte & Paulina Rubio	
July 17	"Golpes en el corazón"	Los Tigres del Norte & Paulina Rubio	
July 24	"Golpes en el corazón"	Los Tigres del Norte & Paulina Rubio	
July 31	"Golpes en el corazón"	Los Tigres del Norte & Paulina Rubio	
August 7	"Golpes en el corazón"	Los Tigres del Norte & Paulina Rubio	
August 14	"Golpes en el corazón"	Los Tigres del Norte & Paulina Rubio	
August 21	"Golpes en el corazón"	Los Tigres del Norte & Paulina Rubio	
August 28	"Golpes en el corazón"	Los Tigres del Norte & Paulina Rubio	
September 4	"Golpes en el corazón"	Los Tigres del Norte & Paulina Rubio	
September 11	"Golpes en el corazón"	Los Tigres del Norte & Paulina Rubio	
September 18	"¿Qué nos pasó?"	Reyli ft. Yuridia	
September 25	"¿Qué nos pasó?"	Reyli ft. Yuridia	
October 2	"¿Qué nos pasó?"	Reyli ft. Yuridia	
October 9	"De mí"	Camila	
October 16	"Te dejo en libertad"	Ha*Ash	
October 23	"De mí"	Camila	
October 30	"Moves like Jagger"	Maroon 5 ft. Christina Aguilera	
November 6	"¡Basta ya!"	Jenni Rivera ft. Marco Antonio Solís	
November 20	"¡Basta ya!"	Jenni Rivera ft. Marco Antonio Solís	
November 27	"¡Basta ya!"	Jenni Rivera ft. Marco Antonio Solís	
December 4	"¡Basta ya!"	Jenni Rivera ft. Marco Antonio Solís	
December 11	"¡Basta ya!"	Jenni Rivera ft. Marco Antonio Solís	
December 18	"¡Basta ya!"	Jenni Rivera ft. Marco Antonio Solís	
December 25	"La noche"	Gloria Trevi	

=== Pop ===
Issue date	Song	Artist(s)	Ref.
January 2	"Bésame"	Camila	
January 9	"Bésame"	Camila	
January 16	"Bésame"	Camila	
January 23	"Bésame"	Camila	
January 30	"Bésame"	Camila	
February 6	"Sale el sol"	Shakira	
February 13	"Sale el sol"	Shakira	
February 20	"Sale el sol"	Shakira	
February 27	"Sale el sol"	Shakira	
March 6	"Sale el sol"	Shakira	
March 13	"Me río de ti"	Gloria Trevi	
March 20	"Me río de ti"	Gloria Trevi	
March 27	"Me río de ti"	Gloria Trevi	
April 3	"Me río de ti"	Gloria Trevi	
April 10	"Me río de ti"	Gloria Trevi	
April 17	"Me río de ti"	Gloria Trevi	
April 24	"Me río de ti"	Gloria Trevi	
May 1	"Me río de ti"	Gloria Trevi	
May 8	"Día de suerte"	Alejandra Guzmán	
May 15	"Entre tus alas"	Camila	
May 22	"Entre tus alas"	Camila	
May 29	"Impermeable"	Ha*Ash	
June 5	"Impermeable"	Ha*Ash	
June 12	"Impermeable"	Ha*Ash	
June 19	"Vestida de azúcar"	Gloria Trevi	
June 26	"Vestida de azúcar"	Gloria Trevi	
July 3	"Vestida de azúcar"	Gloria Trevi	
July 10	"Peligro"	Reik	
July 17	"Vestida de azúcar"	Gloria Trevi	
July 24	"Vestida de azúcar"	Gloria Trevi	
July 31	"Vestida de azúcar"	Gloria Trevi	
August 7	"Vestida de azúcar"	Gloria Trevi	
August 14	"Vestida de azúcar"	Gloria Trevi	
September 4	"Vestida de azúcar"	Gloria Trevi	
September 11	"¿Qué nos pasó?"	Reyli ft. Yuridia	
September 18	"¿Qué nos pasó?"	Reyli ft. Yuridia	
September 25	"¿Qué nos pasó?"	Reyli ft. Yuridia	
October 2	"¿Qué nos pasó?"	Reyli ft. Yuridia	
October 9	"Te dejo en libertad"	Ha*Ash	
October 16	"Te dejo en libertad"	Ha*Ash	
November 27	"De mí"	Camila	
December 4	"De mí"	Camila	
December 11	"De mí"	Camila	
December 18	"La noche"	Gloria Trevi	
December 25	"La noche"	Gloria Trevi	

=== Regional ===
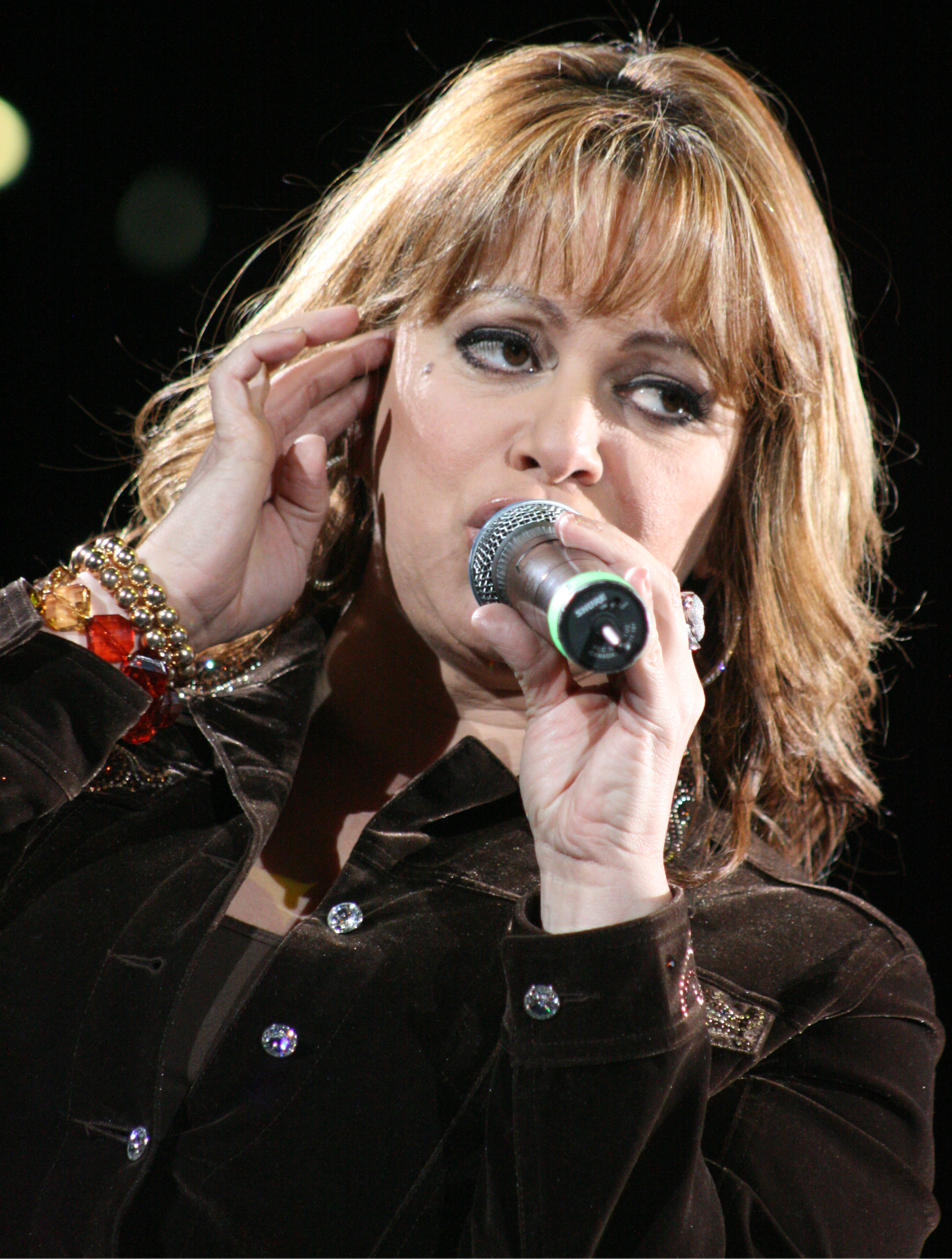
Mexican-American singer Jenni Rivera (pictured) was the first female singer to have topped the Regional chart.

Issue date	Song	Artist(s)	Ref.
January 2	"Disponible para mí"	La Arrolladora Banda El Limón	
January 9	"Te amo y te amo"	La Adictiva Banda San José de Mesillas	
January 16	"Disponible para mí"	La Arrolladora Banda El Limón	
January 23	"Disponible para mí"	La Arrolladora Banda El Limón	
January 30	"Disponible para mí"	La Arrolladora Banda El Limón	
February 13	"Te amo y te amo"	La Adictiva Banda San José de Mesillas	
February 20	"Disponible para mí"	La Arrolladora Banda El Limón	
February 27	"Disponible para mí"	La Arrolladora Banda El Limón	
March 6	"Disponible para mí"	La Arrolladora Banda El Limón	
March 13	"Te amo y te amo"	La Adictiva Banda San José de Mesillas	
March 20	"El tierno se fue"	Calibre 50	
April 10	"El tierno se fue"	Calibre 50	
April 17	"El tierno se fue"	Calibre 50	
April 24	"El tierno se fue"	Calibre 50	
May 1	"El tierno se fue"	Calibre 50	
May 8	"El tierno se fue"	Calibre 50	
May 15	"El tierno se fue"	Calibre 50	
May 22	"Nada iguales"	La Adictiva Banda San José de Mesillas	
May 29	"Nada iguales"	La Adictiva Banda San José de Mesillas	
June 5	"Nada iguales"	La Adictiva Banda San José de Mesillas	
June 12	"Nada iguales"	La Adictiva Banda San José de Mesillas	
June 19	"Nada iguales"	La Adictiva Banda San José de Mesillas	
June 26	"Nada iguales"	La Adictiva Banda San José de Mesillas	
July 3	"Nada iguales"	La Adictiva Banda San José de Mesillas	
July 10	"Nada iguales"	La Adictiva Banda San José de Mesillas	
July 17	"Nada iguales"	La Adictiva Banda San José de Mesillas	
July 24	"Dí que regresarás"	La Original Banda El Limón	
July 31	"Dí que regresarás"	La Original Banda El Limón	
August 7	"Dí que regresarás"	La Original Banda El Limón	
August 14	"Nada iguales"	La Adictiva Banda San José de Mesillas	
September 4	"Nada iguales"	La Adictiva Banda San José de Mesillas	
September 11	"Nada iguales"	La Adictiva Banda San José de Mesillas	
October 2	"¡Basta ya!"	Jenni Rivera	
October 9	"¡Basta ya!"	Jenni Rivera	
October 16	"¡Basta ya!"	Jenni Rivera	
November 27	"El pasado es pasado"	La Adictiva Banda San José de Mesillas	
December 4	"El pasado es pasado"	La Adictiva Banda San José de Mesillas	
December 11	"Mujer de todos, mujer de nadie"	Calibre 50	
December 18	"Mujer de todos, mujer de nadie"	Calibre 50	

=== English ===
Issue date	Song (Audience)	Song (Spins)	Ref
January 2	"The Time (Dirty Bit)"^{The Black Eyed Peas}	"The Time (Dirty Bit)"^{The Black Eyed Peas}	
January 9	"The Time (Dirty Bit)"^{The Black Eyed Peas}	"The Time (Dirty Bit)"^{The Black Eyed Peas}	
January 16	"The Time (Dirty Bit)"^{The Black Eyed Peas}	"The Time (Dirty Bit)"^{The Black Eyed Peas}	
January 23	"The Time (Dirty Bit)"^{The Black Eyed Peas}	"The Time (Dirty Bit)"^{The Black Eyed Peas}	
January 30	"The Time (Dirty Bit)"^{The Black Eyed Peas}	"Sale el Sol"^{Shakira}	
February 6	"The Time (Dirty Bit)"^{The Black Eyed Peas}	"Sale el Sol"^{Shakira}	
February 13	"The Time (Dirty Bit)"^{The Black Eyed Peas}	"Sale el Sol"^{Shakira}	
February 20	"The Time (Dirty Bit)"^{The Black Eyed Peas}	"Sale el Sol"^{Shakira}	
February 27	"The Time (Dirty Bit)"^{The Black Eyed Peas}	"Sale el Sol"^{Shakira}	
March 6	"The Time (Dirty Bit)"^{The Black Eyed Peas}	"Sale el Sol"^{Shakira}	
March 13	"The Time (Dirty Bit)"^{The Black Eyed Peas}	"Sale el Sol"^{Shakira}	
March 20	"The Time (Dirty Bit)"^{The Black Eyed Peas}	"Sale el Sol"^{Shakira}	
March 27	"The Time (Dirty Bit)"^{The Black Eyed Peas}	"Sale el Sol"^{Shakira}	
April 3	"The Time (Dirty Bit)"^{The Black Eyed Peas}	"Sale el Sol"^{Shakira}	
April 10	"The Time (Dirty Bit)"^{The Black Eyed Peas}	"Sale el Sol"^{Shakira}	
April 17	"The Time (Dirty Bit)"^{The Black Eyed Peas}	"Born This Way"^{Lady Gaga}	
April 24	"The Time (Dirty Bit)"^{The Black Eyed Peas}	"Born This Way"^{Lady Gaga}	
May 1	"Born This Way"^{Lady Gaga}	"Born This Way"^{Lady Gaga}	
May 8	"Born This Way"^{Lady Gaga}	"Born This Way"^{Lady Gaga}	
May 15	"Born This Way"^{Lady Gaga}	"On the Floor"^{Jennifer López featuring Pitbull}	
May 22	"Born This Way"^{Lady Gaga}	"On the Floor"^{Jennifer López featuring Pitbull}	
May 29	"On the Floor"^{Jennifer López featuring Pitbull}	"On the Floor"^{Jennifer López featuring Pitbull}	
June 5	"On the Floor"^{Jennifer López featuring Pitbull}	"On the Floor"^{Jennifer López featuring Pitbull}	
June 12	"On the Floor"^{Jennifer López featuring Pitbull}	"On the Floor"^{Jennifer López featuring Pitbull}	
June 19	"Hello"^{Martin Solveig}	"On the Floor"^{Jennifer López featuring Pitbull}	
June 26	"Hello"^{Martin Solveig}	"On the Floor"^{Jennifer López featuring Pitbull}	
July 3	"Hello"^{Martin Solveig}	"On the Floor"^{Jennifer López featuring Pitbull}	
July 10	"Hello"^{Martin Solveig}	"Party Rock Anthem"^{LMFAO}	
July 17	"Hello"^{Martin Solveig}	"Hello"^{Martin Solveig}	
July 24	"Hello"^{Martin Solveig}	"Hello"^{Martin Solveig}	
July 31	"Party Rock Anthem"^{LMFAO}	"Party Rock Anthem"^{LMFAO}	
August 7	"Party Rock Anthem"^{LMFAO}	"Party Rock Anthem"^{LMFAO}	
August 14	"Party Rock Anthem"^{LMFAO}	"Party Rock Anthem"^{LMFAO}	
August 21	"Party Rock Anthem"^{LMFAO}	"Party Rock Anthem"^{LMFAO}	
August 28	"Party Rock Anthem"^{LMFAO}	"Party Rock Anthem"^{LMFAO}	
September 4	"Party Rock Anthem"^{LMFAO}	"Party Rock Anthem"^{LMFAO}	
September 11	"Party Rock Anthem"^{LMFAO}	"Party Rock Anthem"^{LMFAO}	
September 18	"Party Rock Anthem"^{LMFAO}	"Party Rock Anthem"^{LMFAO}	
September 25	"Party Rock Anthem"^{LMFAO}	"Party Rock Anthem"^{LMFAO}	
October 2	"Party Rock Anthem"^{LMFAO}	"Party Rock Anthem"^{LMFAO}	
October 9	"Party Rock Anthem"^{LMFAO}	"Party Rock Anthem"^{LMFAO}	
October 16	"Party Rock Anthem"^{LMFAO}	"Party Rock Anthem"^{LMFAO}	
October 23	"Party Rock Anthem"^{LMFAO}	"Party Rock Anthem"^{LMFAO}	
October 30	"Party Rock Anthem"^{LMFAO}	"Party Rock Anthem"^{LMFAO}	
November 6	"Party Rock Anthem"^{LMFAO}	"Party Rock Anthem"^{LMFAO}	
November 13	"Party Rock Anthem"^{LMFAO}	"Party Rock Anthem"^{LMFAO}	
November 20	"Party Rock Anthem"^{LMFAO}	"Party Rock Anthem"^{LMFAO}	
November 27	"Party Rock Anthem"^{LMFAO}	"Party Rock Anthem"^{LMFAO}	
December 4	"Moves like Jagger"^{Maroon 5 featuring Christina Aguilera}	"Moves like Jagger"^{Maroon 5 featuring Christina Aguilera}	
December 11	"Moves like Jagger"^{Maroon 5 featuring Christina Aguilera}	"Party Rock Anthem"^{LMFAO}	
December 18	"Moves like Jagger"^{Maroon 5 featuring Christina Aguilera}	"Moves like Jagger"^{Maroon 5 featuring Christina Aguilera}	
December 25	"Moves like Jagger"^{Maroon 5 featuring Christina Aguilera}	"Moves like Jagger"^{Maroon 5 featuring Christina Aguilera}	

== See also ==
- List of Top 20 songs for 2011 in Mexico
- List of number-one albums of 2011 (Mexico)
