= Amor mío =

Amor mío may refer to:

- Amor mío (Argentine TV series), a 2005 telenovela
- Amor mío (Mexican TV series), a 2006–2008 adaptation of the Argentine series
- Amor mío (Venezuelan TV series), a 1997 telenovela
- "Amor mio" (song), by Mina, 1971

== See also ==
- Amore Mio (disambiguation)
