= A Solas Con Chayanne =

2012 live album by Chayanne

Live album by Chayanne
- Released: February 7, 2012
- Recorded: June 9–10, 2011 at Auditorio Nacional, Mexico D.F., Mexico
- Genre: Latin pop
- Length: 63:06
- Label: Sony Music Latin

Chayanne chronology
No Hay Imposibles (2010)	A Solas Con Chayanne (2012)	En Todo Estaré (2014)

A Solas Con Chayanne (transl. One on One with Chayanne) is the second live album by Puerto Rican singer Chayanne. It was recorded during his concert at Auditorio Nacional in Mexico as part of the tour No Hay Imposibles.

Like his previous live album Chayanne: Vivo, the album will be released in CD/DVD format. It's also Chayanne's first Blu-ray Disc release.

== CD track listing ==
1. Provocame 5:38
2. Lola 4:09
3. Un Siglo Sin Ti 6:41
4. Si No Estas 4:36
5. Caprichosa 3:19
6. Tu Boca 3:58
7. Baila, Baila 3:58
8. Dejaria Todo 5:19
9. Salome 4:35
10. Besos En La Boca (Bejiar Na Boca) 5:15
11. Tiempo de Vals 4:50
12. Me Enamore de Ti 4:55
13. Torero 6:19
14. Amorcito Corazon 2:54

== DVD track listing ==
1. Provócame 5:38
2. Lola 4:09
3. Un Siglo Sin Ti 6:41
4. Si No Estás 4:36
5. Caprichosa 3:19
6. Y Tú Te Vas 5:00
7. Tu Boca 3:58
8. Atado a Tu Amor 4:53
9. Tu Pirata Soy Yo/Completamente Enamorados Medley 4:51
10. Baila, Baila 3:58
11. Si Nos Quedara Poco Tiempo 8:01
12. Dejaría Todo 5:19
13. Salomé 4:35
14. Besos En La Boca (Beijar Na Boca) 5:15
15. Tiempo De Vals 4:50
16. Me Enamoré De Ti 4:55
17. Torero 6:19

== Charts ==
Chart (2012)	Peak position
US Top Latin Albums (Billboard)	10
US Latin Pop Albums (Billboard)	2

== Sales and certifications ==
Region	Certification	Certified units/sales
Mexico (AMPROFON)	Platinum+Gold	90,000^{‡}
Venezuela (AVINPRO)	Gold	5,000
^{‡} Sales+streaming figures based on certification alone.
