= De mí =

Single by Camila

from the album Dejarte de Amar
- Released: June 20, 2011
- Genre: Latin pop
- Length: 4:41
- Label: Sony Music Latin
- Songwriter: Mario Domm
- Producer: Mario Domm

Camila singles chronology
"Entre Tus Alas" (2011)	"De mí" (2011)	"De que me sirve la vida" (2011)

"De mí" (English: "From Me") is a song by Mexican pop group Camila, released on June 20, 2011 as the four single from their second album, Dejarte de Amar (2010). "Entre tus alas" was written by Mario Domm and produced by Domm. The song reached number three on the US Billboard Latin Pop Airplay charts. A video for the song, which was recorded in the Riviera Maya of Quintana Roo in Mexico, premiered in September 2011. The song was part of the soundtrack of the telenovela Teresa.

== Music video ==
The music video was directed by Pedro Torres and filmed at Riviera Maya of Quintana Roo, Mexico. The video features the group playing the theme and touring the Riviera, while one member is being purified by what seems to be the healer of the tribe.

== Charts ==
Chart (2011)	Peak position
Mexico (Monitor Latino)	1
Mexican Espanol Airplay (Billboard)	1
US Hot Latin Songs (Billboard)	18
US Latin Pop Airplay (Billboard)	3

=== Certifications ===
Region	Certification	Certified units/sales
Mexico (AMPROFON)	Platinum	60,000^{‡}
^{‡} Sales+streaming figures based on certification alone.

== Release history ==
Region	Date	Label	Format
United States	June 20, 2011	Sony Music Latin	CD single
United States	June 20, 2011	Sony Music Latin	Digital download

== See also ==
- List of number-one songs of 2011 (Mexico)
