= Humanos a Marte =

Single by Chayanne

from the album En Todo Estaré
- Released: April 20, 2014
- Genre: Latin pop
- Length: 3:45 (Album Version); 3:34 (Urbano Remix feat. Yandel)
- Label: Sony Music Latin
- Songwriters: Fernando Montesinos; Elmer Figueroa

Chayanne singles chronology
"Si No Estas" (2010)	"Humanos a Marte" (2014)	"Tu Respiración" (2014)

"Humanos a Marte" (English: Humans to Mars) is a song performed by Puerto Rican singer Chayanne, released as the lead single from his upcoming fifteenth studio album En Todo Estaré, by Sony Music Latin on April 20, 2014. The song was written by Chayanne and Fernando Montesinos. On June 17, Chayanne released a remix urban version of the song, featuring the Puerto Rican singer Yandel.

== Track listing ==
- Digital download
1. "Humanos a Marte" - 3:45

== Official versions ==
- Album version (3:45)
- Urbano Remix feat. Yandel (3:34)
- Duet with Brazilian singer Paula Fernandes, a Portuñol version (3:45)

== Charts ==
=== Weekly charts ===
Chart (2014)	Peak position
Dominican Republic Pop (Monitor Latino)	2
Mexico (Billboard Mexican Espanol Airplay)	1
Mexico (Monitor Latino)	2
Spain (PROMUSICAE)	8
US Hot Latin Songs (Billboard)	9
US Latin Airplay (Billboard)	3
US Latin Pop Airplay (Billboard)	3
Venezuela (Record Report)	62

Chart (2020)	Peak position
Nicaragua Pop (Monitor Latino)	6

=== Year-end charts ===
Chart (2014)	Position
Ecuador (Soprofon)	3
Spain (PROMUSICAE)	47
US Latin Songs	31
US Latin Pop Songs	10

Chart (2015)	Position
Dominican Republic Pop (Monitor Latino)	7

Chart (2016)	Position
Dominican Republic Pop (Monitor Latino)	46
Ecuador Pop (Monitor Latino)	69
Panama Pop (Monitor Latino)	20
Venezuela Pop (Monitor Latino)	92

== Certifications ==
Region	Certification	Certified units/sales
Mexico (AMPROFON)	Diamond+Gold	330,000^{‡}
Spain (Promusicae)	Platinum	60,000^{‡}
^{‡} Sales+streaming figures based on certification alone.
