= Mexico Español Airplay =

Chart for Spanish language music singles

Mexico Español Airplay is a record chart published weekly by Billboard magazine for Spanish language singles released in Mexico. According to Billboard's electronic database, the first chart was published on January 17, 2009, with the track "Lo Que Yo Sé de Ti" by Mexican band Ha*Ash. In 2011, fellow Mexican duo Jesse & Joy reached the top of the chart with their single "¡Corre!", the first of their eight number-one singles in the chart, the most for any band. "¡Corre!" also won the Latin Grammy Awards for Record of the Year and Song of the Year in 2012. Starting on December 1, 2012, Mexican singer Thalía spent 10 non-consecutive weeks at number-one with "Manías", the first single from the album Habítame Siempre, which won the Lo Nuestro Award for Pop Album of the Year. "Hoy Tengo Ganas de Ti" by Mexican artist Alejandro Fernández and American singer Christina Aguilera reached number-one in 2013, and also peaked at number four in Spain.

In 2014, seven songs related to telenovelas reached number-one in the chart; "No Querías Lastimarme" by Mexican singer Gloria Trevi was included in the Colombian series ¿Quién mató a Patricia Soler?. "Corazones Invencibles" by Mexican singer-songwriter Aleks Syntek was featured as the main theme for the Mexican telenovela Lo que la vida me robó. Two songs by Mexican band Camila from their third studio album Elypse, were also used in telenovelas: "Decidiste Dejarme", for the Argentinian Telefe's Camino al amor, and "Perdón", for the Mexican Televisa's La malquerida. Chayanne's "Tu Respiración" was the music theme for the telenovela Lo imperdonable. Spanish singer Enrique Iglesias peaked at number one with the single "Bailando", which was featured in Telemundo's telenovela Reina de Corazones. The track also spent 41 consecutive weeks at the top of the Billboard Latin Songs chart in the United States and won the Latin Grammy Award for Song of the Year. The last number-one song of 2014, "Perdón, Perdón" by Mexican duo Ha*Ash, was Rastros de Mentiras main theme in Argentina.

In 2015, two songs reached number-one on both the Mexican Airplay Chart and the Latin Songs chart in the United States, "Ginza" by Colombian performer J Balvin and "El Perdón" by American artist Nicky Jam featuring and Enrique Iglesias.

== Number ones ==
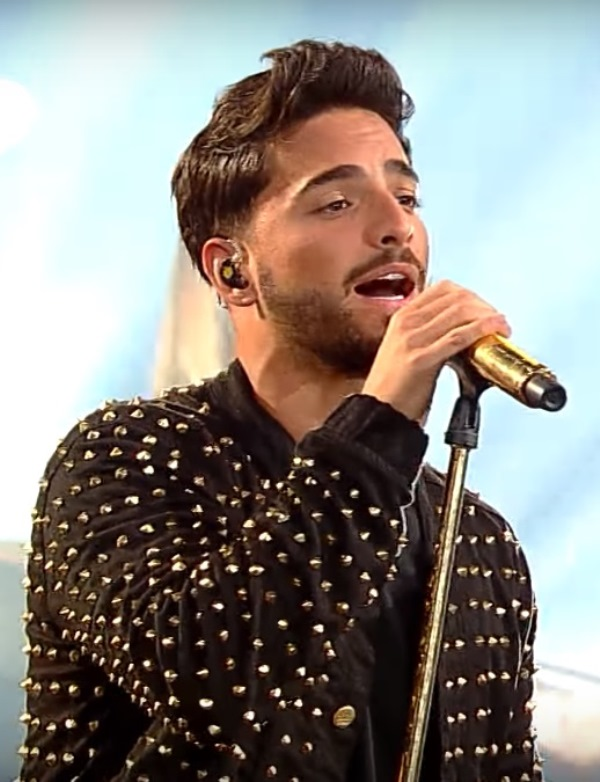
Colombian artist Maluma (pictured in 2017), has reached number-one fourteen times, the most for any solo performer.

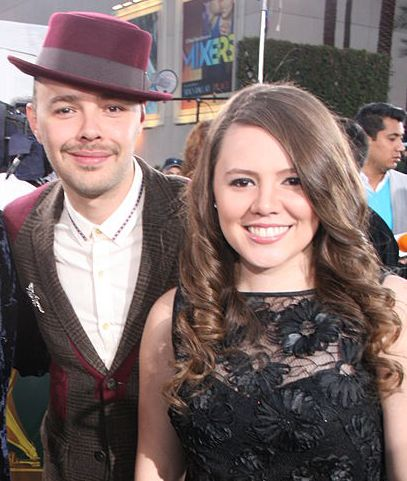
Mexican duo Jesse & Joy (pictured in 2012), has reached number-one thirteen times, the most for any band.

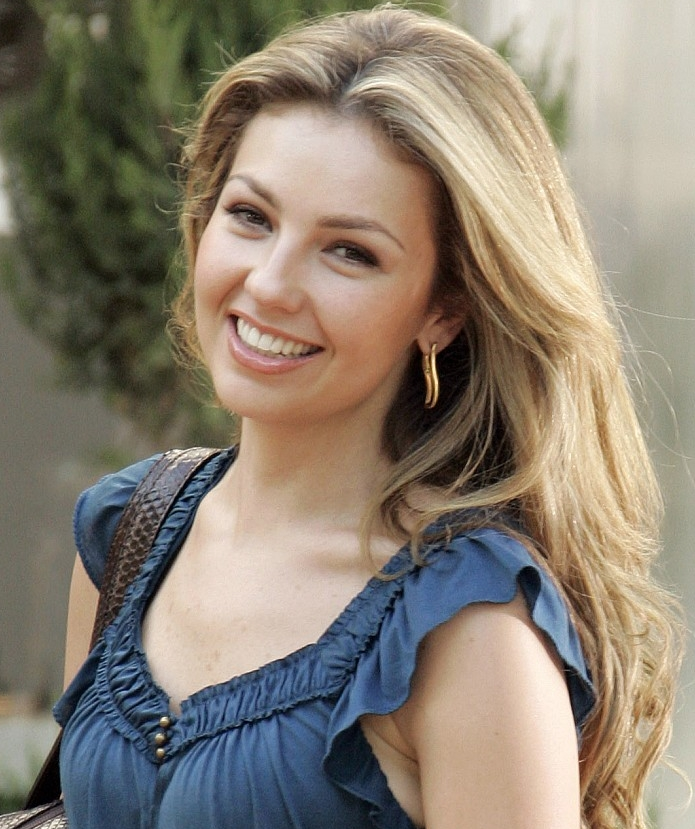
Mexican singer Thalía (pictured in 2012), reached number-one with the songs "Manías", "Te Perdiste Mi Amor", "Amore Mio", and "No Me Acuerdo".

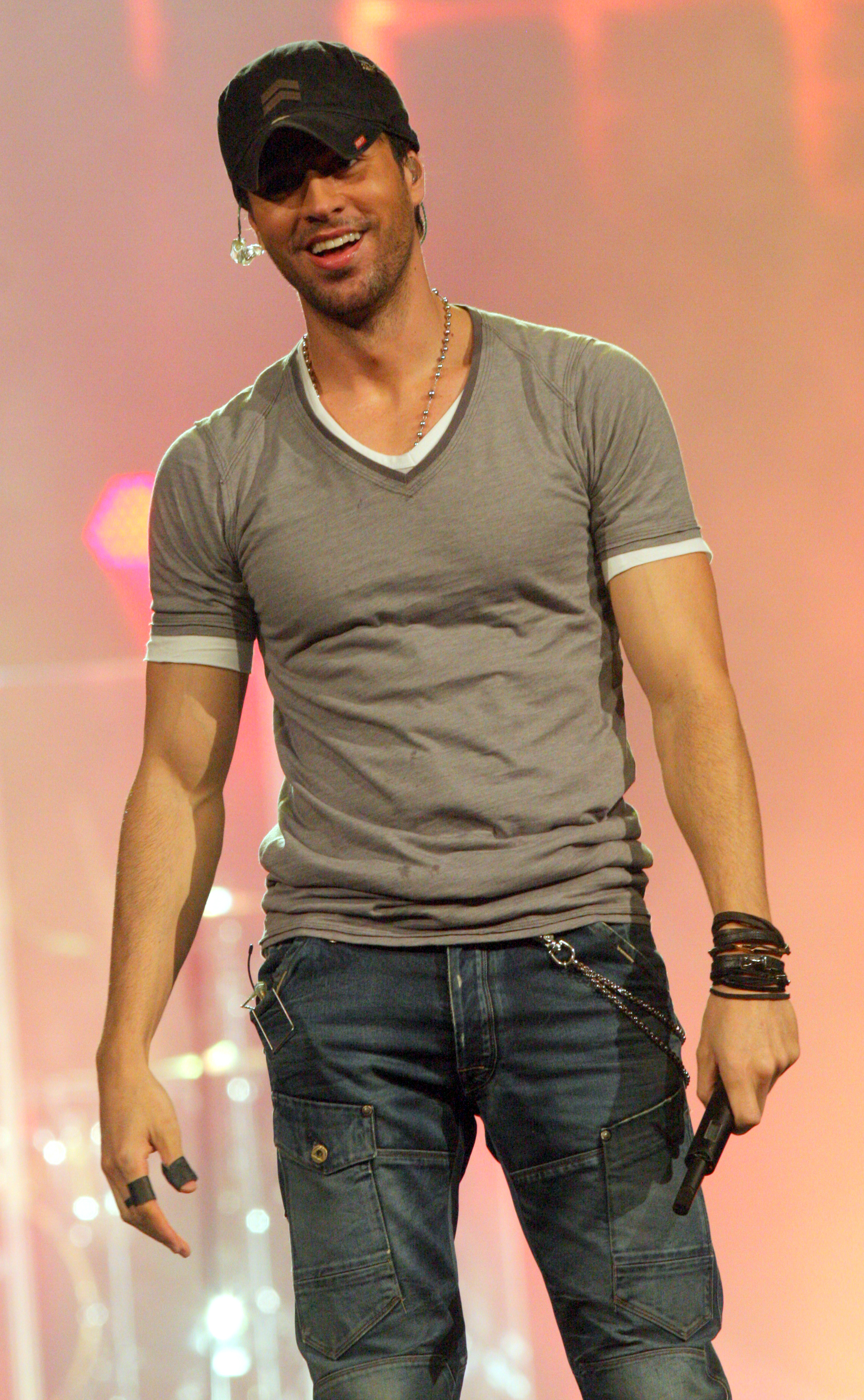
Spanish singer-songwriter Enrique Iglesias (pictured in 2011), peaked at number-one with the songs "Bailando", "El Perdón", "Duele el Corazón" and "Súbeme La Radio".

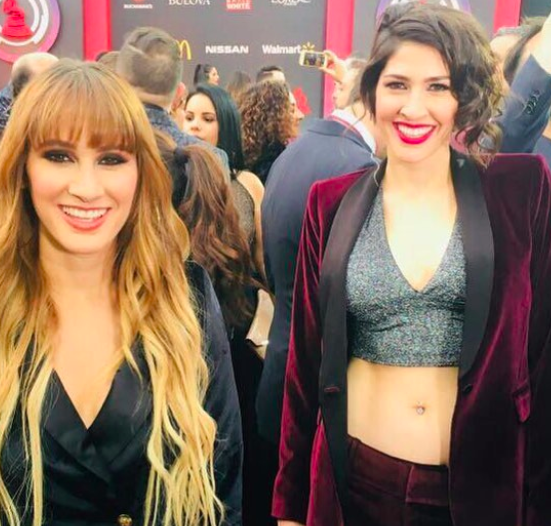
Mexican duo Ha*Ash (pictured in 2017), reached number-one with the songs "Impermeable", "Te Dejo en Libertad", "Perdón, Perdón", "Lo Aprendí de Ti", "100 Años", and "Eso No Va a Suceder".

Key
| No. | nth song to top the Mexico Espanol Airplay Chart |
| re | Return of a song to number one |

| No. | Artist | Single | Reached number one | Weeks at number one | Ref. |
2009
| 1 | Ha*Ash | "Lo Que Yo Sé de Ti" | 17 January 2009 | 4 | |
| 2 | Kalimba | "Se Te Olvidó" | 14 February 2009 | 4 | |
| 3 | Laura Pausini | "En Cambio No" | 14 March 2009 | 1 | |
| 4 | Gloria Trevi | "El Favor de la Soledad" | 21 March 2009 | 6 | |
| 5 | La Oreja de Van Gogh | "Jueves" | 2 May 2009 | 1 | |
| 6 | La 5ª Estación | "Que te Quería" | 9 May 2009 | 4 | |
| 7 | Paulina Rubio | "Causa y Efecto" | 6 June 2009 | 11 | |
| 8 | Shakira | "Loba" | 22 August 2009 | 6 | |
| 9 | Sandoval | "A Quien Tú Decidiste Amar" | 3 October 2009 | 1 | |
| 10 | Alejandro Sanz featuring Alicia Keys | "Looking for Paradise" | 10 October 2009 | 1 | |
| re | Sandoval | "A Quien Tú Decidiste Amar" | 17 October 2009 | 1 | |
| re | Alejandro Sanz featuring Alicia Keys | "Looking for Paradise" | 24 October 2009 | 3 | |
| 11 | Alejandro Fernández | "Se Me Va la Voz" | 14 November 2009 | 2 | |
| 12 | David Bisbal | "Esclavo de Sus Besos" | 28 November 2009 | 1 | |
| re | Alejandro Fernández | "Se Me Va la Voz" | 5 December 2009 | 8 | |
2010
| 13 | Camila | "Mientes" | 30 January 2010 | 7 | |
| 14 | Alejandro Sanz | "Desde Cuándo" | 20 March 2010 | 1 | |
| re | Camila | "Mientes" | 27 March 2010 | 3 | |
| re | Alejandro Sanz | "Desde Cuándo" | 17 April 2010 | 2 | |
| re | Camila | "Mientes" | 1 May 2010 | 1 | |
| 15 | Shakira | "Gitana" | 8 May 2010 | 3 | |
| 16 | Camila | "Aléjate de Mí" | 29 May 2010 | 10 | |
| 17 | Enrique Iglesias featuring Juan Luis Guerra | "Cuando Me Enamoro" | 7 August 2010 | 11 | |
| 18 | Shakira featuring El Cata | "Loca" | 23 October 2010 | 1 | |
| 19 | Camila | "Bésame" | 30 October 2010 | 17 | |
2011
| 20 | Marco Di Mauro and Maite Perroni | "A Partir de Hoy" | 26 February 2011 | 4 | |
| 21 | Gloria Trevi | "Me Río de Ti" | 26 March 2011 | 1 | |
| 22 | Maná | "Lluvia al Corazón" | 2 April 2011 | 1 | |
| 23 | Camila | "Entre Tus Alas" | 9 April 2011 | 3 | |
| 24 | Alejandra Guzmán | "Día de Suerte" | 30 April 2011 | 6 | |
| re | Maná | "Lluvia al Corazón" | 11 June 2011 | 1 | |
| 25 | Ha*Ash | "Impermeable" | 18 June 2011 | 1 | |
| 26 | Luis Fonsi | "Gritar" | 8 June 2011 | 1 | |
| 27 | Jennifer Lopez featuring Pitbull | "Ven a Bailar" | 2 July 2011 | 1 | |
| 28 | Reik | "Peligro" | 9 July 2011 | 1 | |
| 29 | Shakira featuring Pitbull or El Cata | "Rabiosa" | 9 July 2011 | 1 | |
| 30 | Maná | "Amor Clandestino" | 23 July 2011 | 12 | |
| 31 | Camila | "De Mi" | 15 October 2011 | 2 | |
| 32 | Ha*Ash | "Te Dejo en Libertad" | 29 October 2011 | 2 | |
| re | Camila | "De Mi" | 12 November 2011 | 1 | |
| re | Ha*Ash | "Te Dejo en Libertad" | 19 November 2011 | 2 | |
| re | Camila | "De Mi" | 3 December 2011 | 1 | |
| re | Ha*Ash | "Te Dejo en Libertad" | 10 December 2011 | 1 | |
| re | Camila | "De Mi" | 17 December 2011 | 1 | |
| 33 | Jesse & Joy | "¡Corre!" | 24 December 2011 | 1 | |
| re | Ha*Ash | "Te Dejo en Libertad" | 31 December 2011 | 1 | |
2012
| re | Jesse & Joy | "¡Corre!" | 7 January 2012 | 11 | |
| 34 | Camila | "De Qué Me Sirve la Vida" | 24 March 2012 | 5 | |
| 35 | Reik | "Creo en Ti" | 28 April 2012 | 2 | |
| 36 | Jesse & Joy | "La de la Mala Suerte" | 12 May 2012 | 12 | |
| 37 | Miguel Bosé & Ximena Sariñana | "Aire Soy" | 4 August 2012 | 14 | |
| 38 | Jesse & Joy | "¿Con Quién Se Queda El Perro?" | 10 November 2012 | 3 | |
| 39 | Thalía | "Manías" | 1 December 2012 | 1 | |
| re | Jesse & Joy | "¿Con Quién Se Queda El Perro?" | 8 December 2012 | 1 | |
| re | Thalía | "Manías" | 15 December 2012 | 9 | |
2013
| 40 | Jesse & Joy featuring Mario Domm | "Llorar" | 9 February 2013 | 8 | |
| 41 | Sasha, Benny y Erik | "Sin Ti" | 6 April 2013 | 3 | |
| 42 | Reik | "Con la Cara en Alto" | 27 April 2013 | 3 | |
| re | Jesse & Joy featuring Mario Domm | "Llorar" | 4 May 2013 | 1 | |
| re | Reik | "Con la Cara en Alto" | 11 May 2013 | 2 | |
| 43 | Sergio Dalma featuring Leire Martínez | "La Cosa Más Bella" | 25 May 2013 | 1 | |
| re | Reik | "Con la Cara en Alto" | 1 June 2013 | 1 | |
| re | Sergio Dalma featuring Leire Martínez | "La Cosa Más Bella" | 8 June 2013 | 1 | |
| 44 | Alejandro Fernández and Christina Aguilera | "Hoy Tengo Ganas de Ti" | 15 June 2013 | 3 | |
| 45 | Thalía featuring Prince Royce | "Te Perdiste Mi Amor" | 15 June 2013 | 6 | |
| 46 | Samo | "Sin Ti" | 17 August 2013 | 1 | |
| 47 | Yahir featuring Yuridia | "El Alma en Pie" | 24 August 2013 | 10 | |
| 48 | Cristian Castro featuring Reik | "Es Mejor Así" (live) | 2 November 2013 | 2 | |
| 49 | Alejandra Guzmán | "Mi Peor Error" | 16 November 2013 | 11 | |
2014
| 50 | Gloria Trevi | "No Querías Lastimarme" | 1 February 2014 | 4 | |
| 51 | Aleks Syntek | "Corazones Invencibles" | 1 March 2014 | 10 | |
| 52 | Camila | "Decidiste Dejarme" | 10 May 2014 | 6 | |
| 53 | Enrique Iglesias featuring Descemer Bueno and Gente de Zona | "Bailando" | 21 June 2014 | 1 | |
| re | Camila | "Decidiste Dejarme" | 28 June 2014 | 3 | |
| re | Enrique Iglesias featuring Descemer Bueno and Gente de Zona | "Bailando" | 19 July 2014 | 2 | |
| 54 | Chayanne | "Humanos a Marte" | 2 August 2014 | 1 | |
| re | Enrique Iglesias featuring Descemer Bueno and Gente de Zona | "Bailando" | 9 August 2014 | 1 | |
| re | Chayanne | "Humanos a Marte" | 16 August 2014 | 1 | |
| re | Enrique Iglesias featuring Descemer Bueno and Gente de Zona | "Bailando" | 23 August 2014 | 4 | |
| 55 | Río Roma | "Mi Persona Favorita" | 20 September 2014 | 1 | |
| 56 | Camila | "Perdón" | 27 September 2014 | 3 | |
| 57 | Chayanne | "Tu Respiración" | 18 October 2014 | 5 | |
| 58 | Ricky Martin | "Adiós" | 22 November 2014 | 1 | |
| 59 | Ha*Ash | "Perdón, Perdón" | 29 November 2014 | 9 | |
2015
| 60 | Camila | "De Venus" | 31 January 2015 | 2 | |
| 61 | Thalía | "Amore Mio" | 14 February 2015 | 6 | |
| 62 | Ha*Ash | "Lo Aprendí de Ti" | 28 March 2015 | 5 | |
| 63 | Nicky Jam and Enrique Iglesias | "El Perdón" | 2 May 2015 | 10 | |
| 64 | Aleks Syntek | "Tan Cerquita" | 11 July 2015 | 1 | |
| re | Nicky Jam and Enrique Iglesias | "El Perdón" | 18 July 2015 | 3 | |
| 65 | Kalimba | "Estrellas Rotas" | 8 August 2015 | 3 | |
| 66 | Maluma | "Carnaval" | 29 August 2015 | 1 | |
| 67 | Jesse & Joy | "Ecos de Amor" | 5 September 2015 | 5 | |
| 68 | J Balvin | "Ginza" | 10 October 2015 | 1 | |
| re | Jesse & Joy | "Ecos de Amor" | 17 October 2015 | 4 | |
| re | Maluma | "Carnaval" | 14 November 2015 | 1 | |
| re | Jesse & Joy | "Ecos de Amor" | 21 November 2015 | 1 | |
| 69 | Paty Cantú | "Valiente" | 28 November 2015 | 1 | |
| re | Jesse & Joy | "Ecos de Amor" | 5 December 2015 | 1 | |
| re | Paty Cantú | "Valiente" | 12 December 2015 | 1 | |
| 70 | Jesse & Joy featuring Alejandro Sanz | "No Soy Una de Esas" | 19 December 2015 | 7 | |
2016
| 71 | Sin Bandera | "En Esta No" | 6 February 2016 | 1 | |
| re | Jesse & Joy featuring Alejandro Sanz | "No Soy Una de Esas" | 13 February 2016 | 4 | |
| re | Sin Bandera | "En Esta No" | 12 March 2016 | 1 | |
| re | Jesse & Joy featuring Alejandro Sanz | "No Soy Una de Esas" | 19 March 2016 | 5 | |
| 72 | Maluma | "El Perdedor" | 23 April 2016 | 1 | |
| 73 | Joey Montana | "Picky" | 30 April 2016 | 1 | |
| 74 | Enrique Iglesias featuring Wisin | "Duele el Corazón" | 7 May 2016 | 1 | |
| re | Joey Montana | "Picky" | 14 May 2016 | 2 | |
| re | Joey Montana featuring Akon & Mohombi | "Picky" | 28 May 2016 | 1 | |
| re | Enrique Iglesias featuring Wisin | "Duele el Corazón" | 4 June 2016 | 13 | |
| 75 | Carlos Vives and Shakira | "La Bicicleta" | 3 September 2016 | 6 | |
| 76 | Ricky Martin featuring Maluma | "Vente Pa' Ca" | 15 October 2016 | 13 | |
2017
| 77 | CNCO | "Reggaetón Lento (Bailemos)" | 14 January 2017 | 2 | |
| re | Ricky Martin featuring Maluma | "Vente Pa' Ca" | 28 January 2017 | 1 | |
| 78 | Shakira featuring Maluma | "Chantaje" | 4 February 2017 | 5 | |
| 79 | Luis Fonsi featuring Daddy Yankee | "Despacito" | 11 March 2017 | 2 | |
| 80 | Enrique Iglesias featuring Descemer Bueno and Zion & Lennox | "Súbeme La Radio" | 25 March 2017 | 1 | |
| re | Luis Fonsi featuring Daddy Yankee | "Despacito" | 1 April 2017 | 2 | |
| re | Enrique Iglesias featuring Descemer Bueno and Zion & Lennox | "Súbeme La Radio" | 15 April 2017 | 1 | |
| re | Luis Fonsi featuring Daddy Yankee | "Despacito" | 22 April 2017 | 1 | |
| re | Enrique Iglesias featuring Descemer Bueno and Zion & Lennox | "Súbeme La Radio" | 29 April 2017 | 1 | |
| re | Luis Fonsi & Daddy Yankee featuring Justin Bieber | "Despacito" | 6 May 2017 | 6 | |
| 81 | CNCO & Yandel | "Hey DJ" | 17 June 2017 | 3 | |
| 82 | Shakira | "Me Enamoré" | 8 July 2017 | 1 | |
| re | CNCO & Yandel | "Hey DJ" | 15 July 2017 | 3 | |
| re | Shakira | "Me Enamoré" | 5 August 2017 | 1 | |
| 83 | Maluma | "Felices Los 4" | 12 August 2017 | 1 | |
| re | Shakira | "Me Enamoré" | 19 August 2017 | 1 | |
| 84 | J Balvin & Willy William | "Mi Gente" | 26 August 2017 | 7 | |
| re | J Balvin & Willy William featuring Beyoncé | "Mi Gente" | 14 October 2017 | 1 | |
| 85 | Shakira featuring Nicky Jam | "Perro Fiel" | 21 October 2017 | 1 | |
| 86 | Jesse & Joy featuring Gente de Zona | "3 A.M." | 28 October 2017 | 1 | |
| re | Shakira featuring Nicky Jam | "Perro Fiel" | 4 November 2017 | 2 | |
| re | Jesse & Joy featuring Gente de Zona | "3 A.M." | 18 November 2017 | 1 | |
| re | Shakira featuring Nicky Jam | "Perro Fiel" | 25 November 2017 | 4 | |
| 87 | Ha*Ash & Prince Royce | "100 Años" | 23 December 2017 | 1 | |
| 88 | Maluma X Nego do Borel | "Corazón" | 30 December 2017 | 1 | |
2018
| 89 | Luis Fonsi & Demi Lovato | "Échame la Culpa" | 3 January 2018 | 4 | |
| re | Maluma X Nego do Borel | "Corazón" | 27 January 2018 | 1 | |
| re | Luis Fonsi & Demi Lovato | "Échame la Culpa" | 3 February 2018 | 7 | |
| 90 | Reik featuring Ozuna & Wisin | "Me Niego" | 24 March 2018 | 13 | |
| 91 | Carlos Rivera | "Me Muero" | 23 June 2018 | 1 | |
| 92 | Thalía & Natti Natasha | "No Me Acuerdo" | 30 June 2018 | 7 | |
| 93 | Morat | "Cuando Nadie Ve" | 18 August 2018 | 1 | |
| 94 | Shakira & Maluma | “Clandestino” | 25 August 2018 | 4 | |
| 95 | Ha*Ash | “Eso No Va a Suceder” | 22 September 2018 | 1 | |
| re | Shakira & Maluma | “Clandestino” | 29 September 2018 | 1 | |
| 96 | Reik & Maluma | “Amigos con Derechos” | 6 October 2018 | 10 | |
| 97 | Piso 21 | “Puntos Suspensivos” | 15 December 2018 | 1 | |
| 98 | Jesse & Joy | “Te Esperé” | 22 December 2018 | 9 | |
2019
| 99 | Piso 21 & Micro TDH | “Te Vi” | 23 February 2019 | 1 | |
| 100 | Camila | “Te Confieso” | 2 March 2019 | 5 | |
| 101 | Sebastián Yatra & Reik | “Un Año” | 6 April 2019 | 2 | |
| 102 | Daddy Yankee featuring Snow | “Con Calma” | 20 April 2019 | 1 | |
| 103 | Jesse & Joy featuring J Balvin | “Mañana es Too Late” | 27 April 2019 | 1 | |
| re | Daddy Yankee featuring Snow | “Con Calma” | 4 May 2019 | 2 | |
| re | Jesse & Joy featuring J Balvin | “Mañana es Too Late” | 18 May 2019 | 4 | |
| 104 | ROSALÍA, J Balvin & El Guincho | “Con Altura” | 15 June 2019 | 2 | |
| 105 | Maluma | “11 PM” | 29 June 2019 | 5 | |
| 106 | Sebastián Yatra, Daddy Yankee, Jonas Brothers and Natti Natasha | “Runaway” | 3 August 2019 | 2 | |
| 107 | Juanes featuring Alessia Cara | “Querer Mejor” | 17 August 2019 | 2 | |
| 108 | Los Ángeles Azules, Belinda & Lalo Ebratt featuring Horacio Palencia | "Amor a Primera Vista" | 31 August 2019 | 3 | |
| 109 | Camilo + Pedro Capó | "Tutu" | 28 September 2019 | 4 | |
| 110 | Anuel AA, Daddy Yankee and Karol G featuring Ozuna and J Balvin | "China" | 19 October 2019 | 1 | |
| 111 | Maluma featuring Ricky Martin | "No Se Me Quita" | 26 October 2019 | 2 | |
| 112 | Jesse & Joy and Luis Fonsi | "Tanto" | 9 November 2019 | 1 | |
| re | Camilo + Pedro Capó | "Tutu" | 16 November 2019 | 1 | |
| re | Jesse & Joy and Luis Fonsi | "Tanto" | 23 November 2019 | 6 | |
2020
| re | Camilo + Pedro Capó | "Tutu" | 4 January 2020 | 2 | |
| 113 | The Black Eyed Peas x J Balvin | "Ritmo (Bad Boys for Life)" | 18 January 2020 | 1 | |
| 114 | Maná & Sebastian Yatra | "No Ha Parado de Llover" | 25 January 2020 | 2 | |
| 115 | Karol G & Nicki Minaj | "Tusa" | 8 February 2020 | 3 | |
| 116 | Carlos Rivera, Becky G and Pedro Capó | "Perdiendo la Cabeza" | 29 February 2020 | 6 | |
| 117 | J Balvin | "Morado" | 11 April 2020 | 1 | |
| 118 | Danna Paola | "Sodio" | 18 April 2020 | 1 | |
| 119 | Jesse & Joy | "Lo Nuestro Vale Más" | 25 April 2020 | 2 | |
| 120 | Mau y Ricky | "Me Enamora" | 9 May 2020 | 2 | |
| 121 | Camilo | "Favorito" | 23 May 2020 | 1 | |
| re | Mau y Ricky | "Me Enamora" | 30 May 2020 | 1 | |
| 122 | J Balvin | "Rojo" | 6 June 2020 | 1 | |
| 123 | Maluma | "AMDV" | 13 June 2020 | 4 | |
| 124 | Manuel Turizo | "Quiéreme Mientras Se Pueda" | 11 July 2020 | 1 | |
| re | Maluma | "AMDV" | 18 July 2020 | 1 | |
| 125 | Jesse & Joy | "Alguien Más" | 25 July 2020 | 1 | |
| re | Manuel Turizo | "Quiéreme Mientras Se Pueda" | 1 August 2020 | 1 | |
| 126 | Anitta featuring Arcángel & De La Ghetto | "Tócame" | 8 August 2020 | 1 | |
| 127 | Morat & Sebastián Yatra | "Bajo la Mesa" | 15 August 2020 | 1 | |
| 128 | Piso 21 & Feid | "Querida" | 22 August 2020 | 1 | |
| 129 | Maluma | "Hawái" | 29 August 2020 | 8 | |
| 130 | Camilo | "Vida de Rico" | 24 October 2020 | 6 | |
| re | Maluma & The Weeknd | "Hawái" | 5 December 2020 | 1 | |
| 131 | Guaynaa & Sebastián Yatra | "Chica Ideal" | 12 December 2020 | 1 | |
| 132 | Manuel Turizo, Myke Towers & Rauw Alejandro | "La Nota" | 19 December 2020 | 1 | |
| 133 | Piso 21 & Maluma | "Más de la Una" | 26 December 2020 | 1 | |
2021
| 134 | Alejandro Sanz and TINI | "Un Beso en Madrid" | 2 January 2021 | 1 | |
| re | Piso 21 & Maluma | "Más de la Una" | 9 January 2021 | 3 | |
| 135 | RBD | "Siempre He Estado Aquí" | 30 January 2021 | 1 | |
| 136 | CNCO | "Tan Enamorados" | 6 February 2021 | 1 | |
| 137 | Danna Paola | "Calla Tu" | 13 February 2021 | 1 | |
| re | CNCO | "Tan Enamorados" | 20 February 2021 | 1 | |
| re | Danna Paola | "Calla Tu" | 27 February 2021 | 2 | |
| 138 | Camilo | "Ropa Cara" | 13 March 2021 | 1 | |
| re | Danna Paola | "Calla Tu" | 20 March 2021 | 1 | |
| 139 | Sebastián Yatra | "Adiós." | 27 March 2021 | 1 | |
| 140 | Piso 21 | "Tan Bonita" | 3 April 2021 | 2 | |
| 141 | Nicky Jam and Romeo Santos | "Fan de Tus Fotos" | 17 April 2021 | 1 | |
| re | Piso 21 | "Tan Bonita" | 24 April 2021 | 1 | |
| 142 | Camilo | "Millones" | 1 May 2021 | 2 | |
| re | Piso 21 | "Tan Bonita" | 15 May 2021 | 1 | |
| 143 | Maná + Joy | "Eres Mi Religión" | 22 May 2021 | 5 | |
| 144 | Rauw Alejandro | "Todo de Ti" | 26 June 2021 | 6 | |
| 146 | Reik and Maluma | "Perfecta" | 7 August 2021 | 1 | |
| 147 | Enrique Iglesias featuring Farruko | "Me Pasé" | 14 August 2021 | 1 | |
| 148 | LAGOS and Danny Ocean | "Monaco" | 21 August 2021 | 2 | |
| 149 | Lunay & Anitta | "Todo o Nada" | 4 September 2021 | 1 | |
| 150 | Tommy Torres | "Marea" | 11 September 2021 | 1 | |
| re | LAGOS and Danny Ocean | "Monaco" | 18 September 2021 | 2 | |
| 151 | Mario Bautista | "Brindo" | 2 October 2021 | 6 | |
| 152 | Camilo and Evaluna | "Índigo" | 13 November 2021 | 5 | |
| 153 | Maná and Alejandro Fernández | "Mariposa Traicionera" | 18 December 2021 | 4 | |
2022
| 154 | LAGOS featuring Lasso | "Julia" | 15 January 2022 | 1 | |
| 155 | Jesse & Joy | "Llórale a Tu Madre" | 22 January 2022 | 1 | |
| 156 | Piso 21 | "Mató Mi Corazón" | 29 January 2022 | 1 | |
| 157 | Sebastián Yatra | "Tacones Rojos" | 5 February 2022 | 1 | |
| 158 | Natti Natasha and Maluma | "Imposible Amor" | 12 February 2022 | 1 | |
| 159 | Ricky Martin | "Otra Noche en L.A." | 19 February 2022 | 1 | |
| 160 | Zzoilo | "Mon Amour" | 26 February 2022 | 1 | |
| re | Ricky Martin | "Otra Noche en L.A." | 5 March 2022 | 2 | |
| 161 | Maná and Christian Nodal | "Te Lloré Un Río" | 19 March 2022 | 2 | |
| 162 | Gloria Trevi featuring Timo Nuñez | "La Recaída" | 2 April 2022 | 2 | |
| 163 | Mau y Ricky and Eladio Carrion | "No Puede Ser" | 16 April 2022 | 2 | |
| 164 | Ha*Ash | "Lo Que Un Hombre Debería Saber" | 30 April 2022 | 1 | |
| 165 | Anitta | "Envolver" | 7 May 2022 | 1 | |
| re | Ha*Ash | "Lo Que Un Hombre Debería Saber" | 14 May 2022 | 1 | |
| 166 | Shakira and Rauw Alejandro | "Te Felicito" | 21 May 2022 | 1 | |
| re | Ha*Ash | "Lo Que Un Hombre Debería Saber" | 28 May 2022 | 1 | |
| re | Shakira and Rauw Alejandro | "Te Felicito" | 4 June 2022 | 1 | |
| 167 | Jesse & Joy | "Imagina" | 11 June 2022 | 1 | |
| re | Shakira and Rauw Alejandro | "Te Felicito" | 18 June 2022 | 3 | |
| re | Jesse & Joy | "Imagina" | 9 July 2022 | 2 | |
| 168 | Becky G | "Bailé Con Mi Ex" | 23 July 2022 | 1 | |
| re | Jesse & Joy | "Imagina" | 30 July 2022 | 2 | |
| 169 | Mau y Ricky and Carin León | "Llorar y Llorar" | 13 August 2022 | 1 | |
| 170 | Manuel Turizo | "La Bachata" | 20 August 2022 | 1 | |
| 171 | Chayanne | "Te Amo y Punto" | 27 August 2022 | 1 | |
| 172 | Rosalía | "Despechá" | 3 September 2022 | 1 | |

=== Artists with most number-one singles ===
| Artist | Number-one hits |
|---|---|
| Maluma | 15 |
| Jesse & Joy | 14 |
| Camila | 10 |
| Shakira | 9 |
| Ha*Ash | 8 |
| Camilo | 6 |
| Reik | 6 |
| J Balvin | 5 |
| Enrique Iglesias | 5 |
| Maná | 5 |
| Thalía | 4 |
| Gloria Trevi | 4 |

=== Artists by total number of weeks at number one ===
| Artist | Weeks at number-one |
|---|---|
| Jesse & Joy | 89 |
| Camila | 67 |
| Maluma | 52 |
| Enrique Iglesias | 49 |
| Shakira | 37 |
| Reik | 35 |
| Thalía | 29 |
| Luis Fonsi | 24 |
| Ha*Ash | 22 |
| Maná | 22 |
| Camilo | 17 |
| J Balvin | 17 |
| Ricky Martin | 17 |
| Alejandro Sanz | 16 |
| Miguel Bosé | 14 |
| Ximena Sariñana | 14 |
| Nicky Jam | 13 |
| Daddy Yankee | 12 |
| Alejandra Guzmán | 11 |
| Aleks Syntek | 11 |
| Yahir | 10 |
| Yuridia | 10 |
