= En Todo Estaré =

Studio album by Chayanne
- Released: August 25, 2014
- Genre: Latin pop
- Length: 39:59
- Language: Spanish
- Label: Sony Music Latin
- Producer: Marcello Azevedo; Hal Batt; Estéfano; Guillermo Lefeld; Pedro Namerow; José Luis Pagán; Antonio Rayo; Yotuel Romero; Afo Verde

Chayanne chronology
A Solas Con Chayanne (2012)	En Todo Estaré (2014)	Bailemos Otra Vez (2023)

Alternative covers
- Deluxe Edition Cover

Singles from En Todo Estaré
- 1. "Humanos a Marte" Released: April 20, 2014; 2. "Tu Respiración" Released: August 11, 2014; 3. "Madre Tierra (Oye)" Released: August 25, 2014

En Todo Estaré (transl. I'll Be In Everything) is the 15th studio album by Puerto Rican performer Chayanne. This album was released on August 25, 2014.

== Track list ==
No.	Title	Writer(s)	Length
1.	"Madre Tierra (Oye)"	René Touzet	3:25
2.	"Humanos a Marte"	Chayanne; Fernando Montesinos	3:45
3.	"Tu Respiración"	Chayanne; Fernando Rossi; Pablo Durand	4:10
4.	"Bailando Dos Corazones"	Estéfano	4:10
5.	"Mareaito Con Tu Amor"	Chayanne; Emiliano Vásquez; José Ariel Fernández; Vladimir Dotel	3:18
6.	"En Todo Estaré"	Estéfano; Julio C. Reyes	3:44
7.	"Quiero Bailar Contigo"	Chayanne; Antonio González; Emiliano Vásquez; José Ariel Fernández; Vladimir Dotel	3:43
8.	"Dímelo"	Chayanne; Franco De Vita; José Luis Pagán; Patty Vega	3:40
9.	"De Todas"	Chayanne; Kany García	2:22
10.	"Infinita Tú"	Estéfano; Julio C. Reyes	4:02
11.	"Tubuduru"	Estéfano	3:38

Deluxe Edition
No.	Title	Writer(s)	Length
12.	"Tu Respiración" (Acoustic Version)	Chayanne; Fernando Rossi; Pablo Durand	4:09
13.	"Dímelo" (Acoustic Version)	Chayanne; Franco De Vita; José Luis Pagán; Patty Vega	3:37
14.	"Humanos a Marte" (Urban Remix - featuring Yandel)	Chayanne; Yandel; Fernando Montesinos	3:31
Total length:			51:19

== Reception ==
Professional ratings
Review scores
Source	Rating
Allmusic	3.5/5 stars

The album was well received by critics on AllMusic where it got a 3.5 star rating. It also received gold and platinum certifications in several countries in America such as Mexico and Chile.

== Charts ==
=== Weekly charts ===
Chart (2014)	Peak position
Argentinian Albums (CAPIF)	1
Mexican Albums (AMPROFON)	1
Spanish Albums (PROMUSICAE)	1
Uruguayan Albums (CUD)	18
US Billboard 200	23
US Top Latin Albums (Billboard)	1
US Latin Pop Albums (Billboard)	1

=== Year-end charts ===
Chart (2014)	Position
US Top Latin Albums (Billboard)	13
Chart (2015)	Position
US Top Latin Albums (Billboard)	51

== Sales and certifications ==
Region	Certification	Certified units/sales
Argentina (CAPIF)	Platinum	40,000^{^}
Chile (IFPI)	Platinum	15,000
Mexico (AMPROFON)	2× Platinum	120,000^{‡}
United States (RIAA)	Gold (Latin)	30,000^{^}
Venezuela (AVINPRO)	Gold	5,000
^{^} Shipments figures based on certification alone.^{‡} Sales+streaming figures based on certification alone.

== See also ==
- List of number-one Billboard Latin Albums from the 2010s
- List of number-one albums of 2014 (Spain)
