= Amore Mio (song) =

Single by Thalía

from the album Amore Mío
- Released: January 20, 2015
- Recorded: 2014
- Genre: Latin pop
- Length: 3:47
- Label: Sony Music Latin
- Songwriter: José Luis Ortega
- Producer: Armando Avila

Thalía singles chronology
"Por Lo Que Reste De Vida" (2014)	"Amore Mio" (2015)	"Como Tú No Hay Dos" (2015)

Lyric video
- "Amore Mio" on YouTube

"Amore Mio" (English: My Love) is a song by Mexican singer-songwriter Thalía from her twelfth studio album of the same name (2014). The song was written by José Luis Ortega and produced by Armando Avila and was released by Sony Music Latin as the second single from the album in the Mexican territory on January 20, 2015.

== Release and reception ==
In the Mexican territory, the song was officially announced by Sony Music as the second single of the album. Thalía has mentioned that she dedicated the song to her husband Tommy Mottola. The song debuted in Mexico's general airplay chart, gaining even more airplay than the album's first single and peaking at #1. In the pop chart, published by Monitor Latino, the song also peaked at #1.

== Video ==
Though the song does not have an official music video, Thalía did release an official lyric video for the song on her YouTube channel. The video is made up of images from the promotional photo session for the album and short video recordings in Thalía's studio.

== Charts ==
=== Weekly charts ===
Chart (2015)	Peak position
Mexico (Billboard Mexican Airplay)	6
Mexico (Billboard Espanol Airplay)	1
Mexico (Monitor Latino)	10
Mexico Pop (Monitor Latino)	1

=== Year-end charts ===
Chart (2015)	Position
Mexico Pop (Monitor Latino)	6
