= Como Tú No Hay Dos (song) =

Single by Thalía featuring Becky G

from the album Amore Mío
- English title: "Like You There Ain't Two"
- Released: January 20, 2015
- Recorded: 2014
- Genre: Latin pop
- Length: 4:12
- Label: Sony Music Latin
- Songwriters: A. Matheus; Andy Clay; Rassel Marcano; Rebbeca Marie Gomez
- Producer: Armando Avila

Thalía singles chronology
"Amore Mio" (2015)	"Como Tú No Hay Dos" (2015)	"Sólo Parecía Amor" (2015)

Becky G singles chronology
"Can't Stop Dancin'" (2014)	"Como Tú No Hay Dos" (2015)	"Lovin' So Hard" (2015)

Music video
- "Como Tú No Hay Dos" on YouTube

"Como Tú No Hay Dos" (Like You There Ain't Two) is a song by Mexican singer-songwriter Thalía featuring American singer and rapper Becky G, from the former's twelfth studio album Amore Mío (2014). The song, written by A. Matheus, Andy Clay, Rassel Marcano and Gomez, and produced by Armando Avila, was released by Sony Music Latin as the second single from the album in the United States on January 20, 2015.

== Background and release ==
The song was released on January 20, 2015. The track features Spanglish vocals by both singers, with Thalía leaning more towards Spanish compared to Becky G's Spanish-sprinkled English verses. The fact that the song was in Spanglish was received as a surprise since Thalía rarely sings in English.

== Live performance ==
Thalía and Becky G performed the song at the Premio Lo Nuestro 2015 in gold dresses with several backup dancers. The performance drew attention because of two incidents: at the end of the performance, Becky G turned her head away as Thalía was going to kiss her forehead, and the second was when Thalía messed up the choreography and accidentally placed her hand on Becky G's private area.

== Music video ==
The music video was released on March 19, 2015, on Thalía's official YouTube channel. One day after its release, the video reached number one on the digital downloaded videos chart in the U.S. and Mexico. The video shows Thalía and Becky G singing and dancing in a rave-like setting with dancers and in solo shots. It received comparisons to the video of "On the Floor" by American singer-actress Jennifer Lopez featuring American rapper Pitbull due to its scenery and clothing. As of September 2024, the video has over 21 million views.

== Charts ==
Chart (2015)	Peak position
US Latin Pop Digital Songs Sales (Billboard)	24
US Latin Pop Airplay (Billboard)	20
US (Monitor Latino)	10
