= Amore Mio (album) =

Studio album by Thalía
- Released: November 4, 2014
- Recorded: 2014
- Genre: Latin pop; dance-pop
- Length: 46:17
- Language: Spanish
- Label: Sony Music Latin
- Producer: Armando Ávila; Thalía

Thalía chronology
| Viva Kids Vol. 1 (2014) | Amore Mio (2014) | Latina (2016) |

Alternative cover
- Deluxe edition album cover

Singles from Amore Mio
- 1. "Por Lo Que Reste De Vida" Released: September 9, 2014; 2. "Amore Mio" Released: January 20, 2015 (Mexico); 3. "Como Tú No Hay Dos" Released: January 20, 2015 (US); 4. "Sólo Parecía Amor" Released: April 14, 2015

Amore Mio (stylized as AMOREMIO) (English: My Love) is the fourteenth studio album by Mexican recording artist Thalía, released on November 4, 2014 by Sony Music Latin on both standard and deluxe editions. The deluxe edition consists of 14 tracks, including collaborations with rappers Fat Joe and Becky G. It is also Thalía's first studio album since 2012's Habítame Siempre.

The album's lead single was "Por Lo Que Reste De Vida", a romantic ballad written by Ricky Montaner. It was released on September 9, 2014 and gained moderate airplay success. Thalía chose to release two singles simultaneously on January 20, 2015. The duet with Becky G, "Como Tú No Hay Dos" was released as the official single for the United States and the rest of Latin America, while the homonymous song "Amore Mio", written by Jose Luis Roma, was announced as the official second single in the Mexican territory where it reached #10. "Solo Parecia Amor" was released as the third single in both territories and fourth single overall.

The album received generally positive reviews by music critics and fans and it reached the #1 position in both the Top Latin and Latin Pop album charts, published by Billboard. It also reached #1 in Mexico, where it was certified platinum.

== Background and composition ==
The album has two songs called "Tú y Yo" and "Olvídame", which are different from the same titled songs from Thalía's seventh and ninth studio albums Thalía (2002) and El Sexto Sentido (2005) respectively. The album includes collaborations with songwriters such as Marcela de la Garza and Ricky Montaner, son of the Argentine-born Venezuelan singer and songwriter Ricardo Montaner.

== Promotion ==
=== Singles ===
Thalía released the lead single "Por Lo Que Reste De Vida" on September 9, 2014. The music video of the song premiered on Primer Impacto on October 13, 2014. One day later, it was uploaded on Thalia's official VEVO account on YouTube. The single gained moderate success in the charts, especially in Mexico, where it reached the #2 position in the Spanish Airplay chart, published by Billboard. The song also reached #19 in the US Latin Pop chart. The song was praised by both fans and critics, especially for its powerful lyrics written by Ricardo Montaner, and Thalia's vocals. However, it was labeled as a weak choice for a first single, leading to the album's first week moderate sales in the United States, where it debuted at the #1 position in both the Latin Pop and Top Latin albums charts, but failed to become a big seller for that week or at least maintain its success.

The second US single of the album is "Como Tú No Hay Dos", a duet with Becky G. The song was sent to Spanish contemporary radio format in the US on January 20, 2015. The music video of the song was filmed in New York on February 9, 2015. Thalia performed the song alongside Becky G at the Lo Nuestro awards on February 19, 2015. On March 19, 2015 the official video premiered on Thalia's VEVO Channel. After its release, the music video had some controversy as it was being compared to the music video "On The Floor" by American singer Jennifer Lopez for some similarities.

In the Mexican territory, the homonymous song of the album ("Amore Mio") was officially announced by Sony Music as the second single of the album. The song debuted in Mexico's general airplay chart, gaining even more airplay than the album's first single and peaking at #1. In the pop chart, published by Monitor Latino, the song peaked at #1.

On February 10, 2015 Thalía announced that "Sólo Parecía Amor" will be the album's official third single, and on the same day she filmed the song's music video. The song also peaked at #1 in Mexico.

=== Tour ===
Thalía has mentioned in many of the promotion interviews that she plans to further support and promote the album with a tour that would coincide with the celebration of the 25th anniversary of her career as a solo artist. She said: "It's something big and we should celebrate it as it deserves. I hope to have an Amore Mio Tour after the new songs become more familiar in the public".

== Reception ==
=== Critical response ===
The album was praised by the majority of music critics, and fans as well. Thom Jurek of AllMusic rated the album with 3.5 out of 5 stars, stating that "Amore Mio attempts to walk the balance between the organic and the synthetic". He also praised the two collaborations of the album, "Tranquila" because it "features stacked, nearly flamenco-styled vocals and skittering hip-hop beats as Fat Joe offers shouted crew support", and "Como Tú No Hay Dos" for its "dramatic acoustic guitars, accordion, and four-on-the-floor beats". He also mentioned that "the spoken word that introduces "Tú Puedes Ser" frames one of the most uplifting and sincere performances on the disc".

Judy Cantor-Navas of Rhapsody also gave a favorable review, mentioning that "the ballad "Por Lo Que Reste de Vida" spotlights a stripped-down Thalia, starting with a spare arrangement with voice and piano with musical drama following as the track quickly crescendos to a passionate, full-band climax".

=== Chart performance ===
The album debuted at the top position on the Mexican charts and the U.S. Latin and Latin Pop albums chart. The album also peaked at number 173 on the Billboard 200 and 55 on the Spanish albums chart.

== Track listing ==
Standard edition
| No. | Title | Writer(s) | Producer(s) | Length |
|---|---|---|---|---|
| 1. | "Amore Mio" | José Luis Ortega | A. Ávila, Thalía, T. Mottola | 3:47 |
| 2. | "Por Lo Que Reste De Vida" | Ricky Montaner | A. Ávila, Thalía, T. Mottola | 3:38 |
| 3. | "Más" | Thalía, Marcela de la Garza | A. Ávila, Thalía, T. Mottola | 3:52 |
| 4. | "Cerveza en México" | Kenny Chesney (Spanish adaptation by Marcela de la Garza) | A. Ávila, Thalía, T. Mottola | 3:38 |
| 5. | "Lo Más Bonito de Ti" | José Luis Ortega, Armando Ávila | A. Ávila, Thalía, T. Mottola | 4:05 |
| 6. | "Contigo Quiero Estar" | Marcus Lomax, Jordan Johnson, Clarence Coffee, Stefan Johnson, Michael Biancaniello (Spanish adaptation by Thalía) | A. Ávila, Thalía, T. Mottola | 3:52 |
| 7. | "Cómete Mi Boca" | Thalía, Marcela de la Garza | A. Ávila, Thalía, T. Mottola | 3:23 |
| 8. | "Tranquila" (featuring Fat Joe) | Thalía, Marcela de la Garza, Armando Ávila, Andrés Guardado (rap part written by Joseph Antonio Cartagena) | Armando Ávila | 3:32 |
| 9. | "Tú y Yo" | Marcela de la Garza, Baltazar Hinojosa, Orlando Vitto | A. Ávila, Thalía, T. Mottola | 3:48 |
| 10. | "Como Tú No Hay Dos" (featuring Becky G) | A. Matheus10, Andy Clay, Rassel Marcano | Armando Ávila | 4:12 |
| 11. | "Sólo Parecía Amor" | José Luis Ortega, Armando Ávila | A. Ávila, Thalía, T. Mottola | 4:27 |
| 12. | "Olvídame" | Carlos Macías | A. Ávila, Thalía, T. Mottola | 4:03 |
| Total length: | | | | 46:17 |

Deluxe edition (bonus tracks)
| No. | Title | Writer(s) | Producer(s) | Length |
|---|---|---|---|---|
| 13. | "Tú Puedes Ser" | Thalía, José Luis Ortega | A. Ávila, Thalía, T. Mottola | 3:37 |
| 14. | "Gracias" | Thalía, Marcela de la Garza | A. Ávila, Thalía, T. Mottola | 4:48 |
| Total length: | | | | 54:42 |

== Personnel ==
- Armando Ávila - Arreglos, Composer
- Michael Biancaniello - Composer
- Kenny Chesney - Composer
- Andy Clay - Composer
- Clarence Coffee, Jr. - Composer
- Marcela de la Garza - Adaptation, Composer
- Fat Joe - Featured Artist
- Paul Forat - A&R
- Becky G - Featured Artist
- Andres "Chano" Guardado - Composer
- Baltazar Hinojosa - Composer
- Jordan Johnson - Composer
- Stefan Johnson - Composer
- Marcus Lomax - Composer
- Carlos Macias - Composer
- Rassel Marcano - Composer
- Ricky Montaner - Composer
- José Luis Roma - Composer
- Thalía Sodi - Adaptation, Composer
- Thalía - Primary Artist
- Orlando Vitto - Composer

== Charts ==
=== Weekly charts ===
| Chart (2014–2015) | Peak position |
|---|---|
| Mexican Albums (AMPROFON) | 1 |
| Spanish Albums (PROMUSICAE) | 55 |
| US Top Latin Albums (Billboard) | 1 |
| US Latin Pop Albums (Billboard) | 1 |
| US Billboard 200 | 173 |

=== Year-end charts ===
| Chart (2014) | Position |
|---|---|
| Mexico (Mexican Albums Chart) | 35 |

| Chart (2015) | Position |
|---|---|
| Mexico (Mexican Albums Chart) | 51 |
| US Top Latin Albums | 63 |
| US Latin Pop Albums | 18 |

== Certifications and sales ==
| Region | Certification | Certified units/sales |
|---|---|---|
| Mexico (AMPROFON) | Platinum | 60,000^{^} |
^{^} Shipments figures based on certification alone.

== Release history ==
| Country | Date | Format(s) | Edition(s) | Label |
|---|---|---|---|---|
| Worldwide | November 4, 2014 | Digital download | Standard, Deluxe | Sony Music Latin |
| United States | November 17, 2014 | CD, digital download | Standard, Deluxe | Sony Music Latin |
| Mexico | November 4, 2014 | CD | Deluxe | Sony Music Mexico |
| Spain | November 4, 2014 | CD | Standard | Sony Music Spain |
| Belgium | November 4, 2014 | CD | Standard | Sony Music Distribution |
| Hungary | November 11, 2014 | CD | Deluxe | Sony Music Distribution |
| Argentina | November 21, 2014 | CD | Deluxe | Sony Music Argentina |
| Taiwan | December 2, 2014 | CD | Deluxe | Sony Music Taiwan |
| Greece | February 5, 2015 | CD | Standard | Feelgood Records |
| Brazil | February 28, 2015 | CD | Deluxe | Sony Music Brazil |
