= List of number-one albums of 2011 (Mexico) =

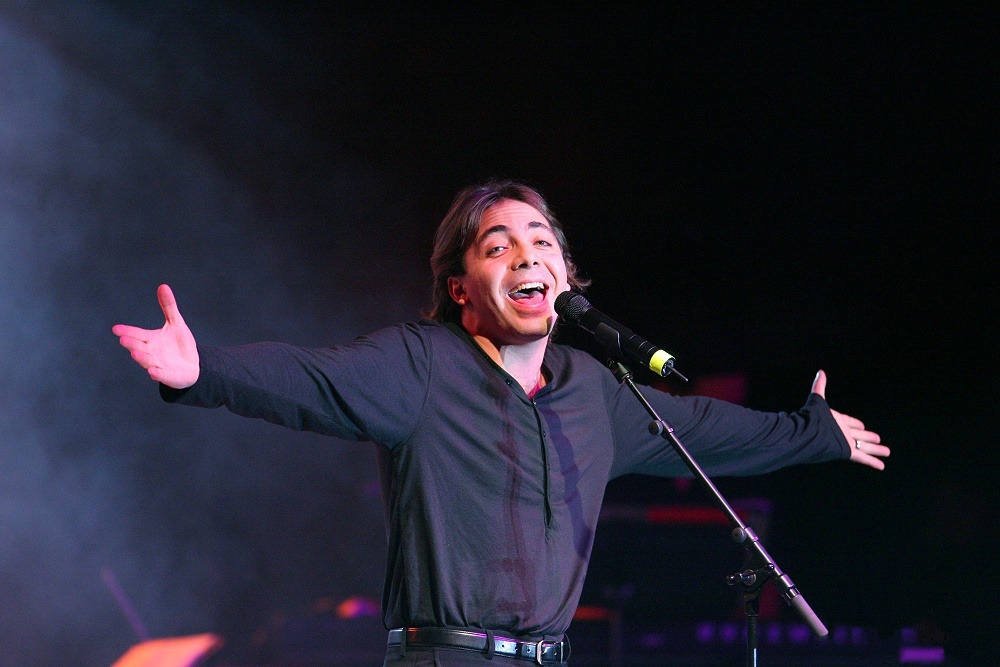
Mexican singer Cristian Castro stayed at number-one for 15 weeks in 2010 and 2011 with his thirteenth studio album Viva el príncipe.

Top 100 Mexico is a record chart published weekly by AMPROFON (Asociación Mexicana de Productores de Fonogramas y Videogramas), a non-profit organization composed by Mexican and multinational record companies. This association tracks record sales (physical and digital) in Mexico.

== Chart history ==
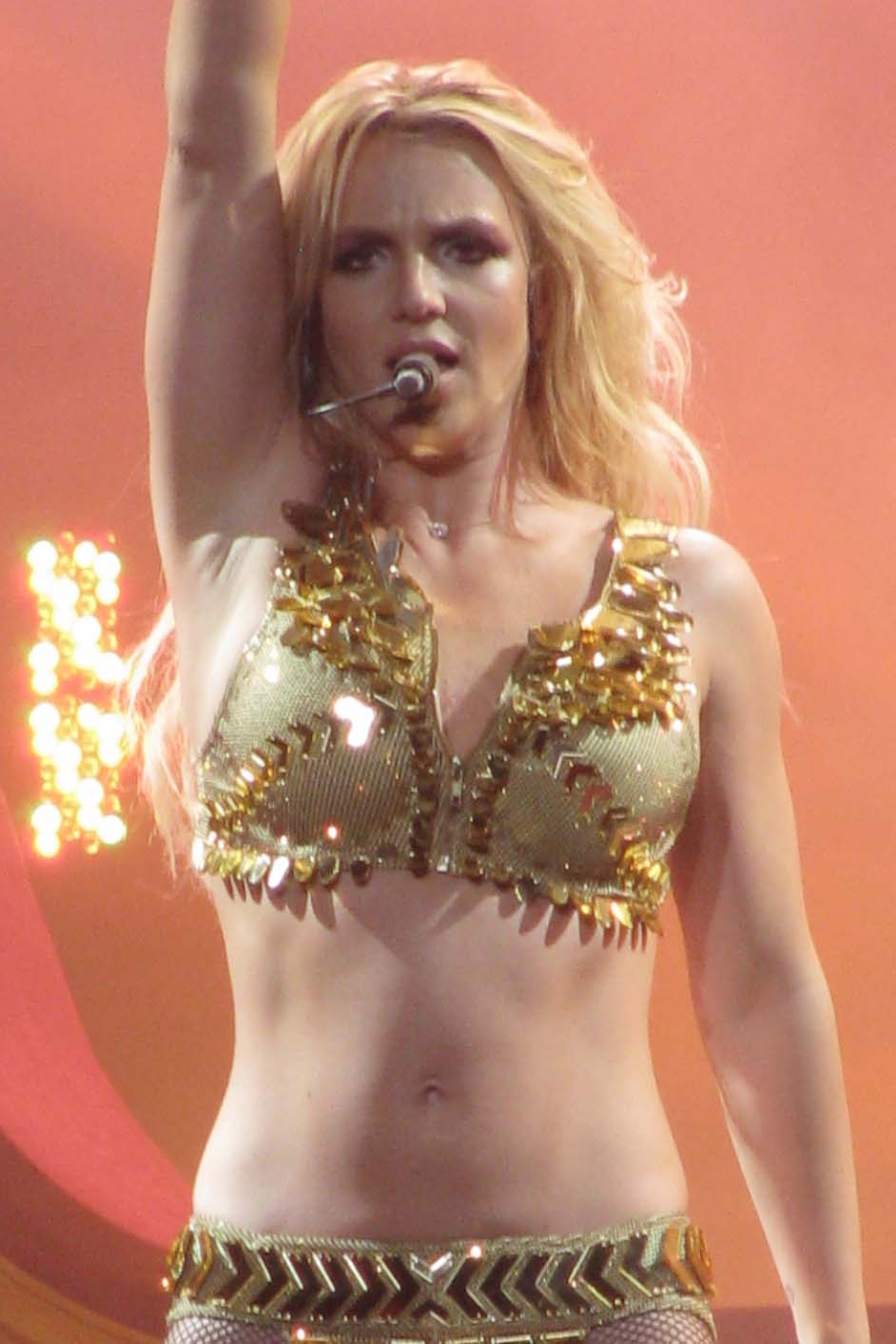
Femme Fatale by Britney Spears was the first English album to debut at No. 1 in 2011

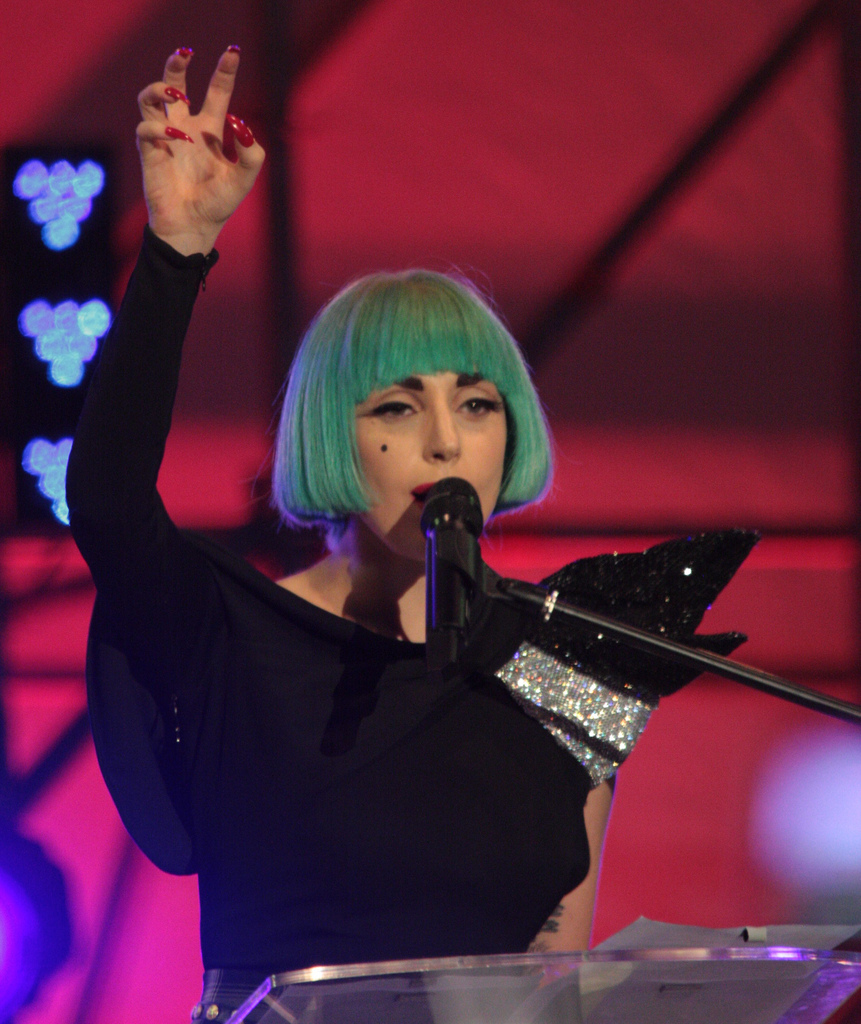
Lady Gaga's album, Born This Way, debuted at No. 1 with platinum sales.

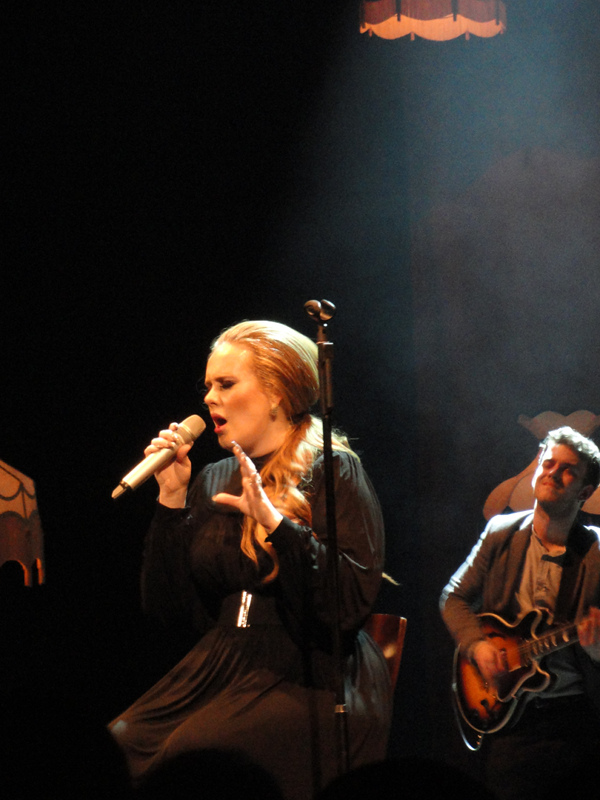
21 by Adele initially entered into the position 97 and later reached No. 1 seven months after its Mexican release.

The yellow background indicates the best-performing album of 2011.

Chart date	Album	Artist	Reference
January 2	Viva el príncipe	Cristian Castro	
January 9	Viva el príncipe	Cristian Castro	
January 16	Viva el príncipe	Cristian Castro	
January 23	Viva el príncipe	Cristian Castro	
January 30	Los Vaqueros: El Regreso	Wisin & Yandel	
February 6	Viva el príncipe	Cristian Castro	
February 13	Viva el príncipe	Cristian Castro	
February 20	Viva el príncipe	Cristian Castro	
February 27	Viva el príncipe	Cristian Castro	
March 6	Viva el príncipe	Cristian Castro	
March 13	Viva el príncipe	Cristian Castro	
March 20	MTV Unplugged/Música de Fondo	Zoé	
March 27	Gloria	Gloria Trevi	
April 3	MTV Unplugged/Música de Fondo	Zoé	
April 10	Femme Fatale	Britney Spears	
April 17	Drama y Luz	Maná	
April 24	MTV Unplugged/Música de Fondo	Zoé	
May 1	MTV Unplugged/Música de Fondo	Zoé	
May 8	MTV Unplugged/Música de Fondo	Zoé	
May 15	Viva el príncipe	Cristian Castro	
May 22	MTV Unplugged/Música de Fondo	Zoé	
May 29	Born This Way	Lady Gaga	
June 5	MTV Unplugged: Los Tigres del Norte and Friends	Los Tigres del Norte	
June 12	MTV Unplugged: Los Tigres del Norte and Friends	Los Tigres del Norte	
June 19	MTV Unplugged: Los Tigres del Norte and Friends	Los Tigres del Norte	
June 26	MTV Unplugged: Los Tigres del Norte and Friends	Los Tigres del Norte	
July 3	MTV Unplugged: Los Tigres del Norte and Friends	Los Tigres del Norte	
July 10	MTV Unplugged: Los Tigres del Norte and Friends	Los Tigres del Norte	
July 17	MTV Unplugged: Los Tigres del Norte and Friends	Los Tigres del Norte	
July 24	MTV Unplugged: Los Tigres del Norte and Friends	Los Tigres del Norte	
July 31	MTV Unplugged: Los Tigres del Norte and Friends	Los Tigres del Norte	
August 7	MTV Unplugged: Los Tigres del Norte and Friends	Los Tigres del Norte	
August 14	MTV Unplugged: Los Tigres del Norte and Friends	Los Tigres del Norte	
August 21	MTV Unplugged: Los Tigres del Norte and Friends	Los Tigres del Norte	
August 28	MTV Unplugged: Los Tigres del Norte and Friends	Los Tigres del Norte	
September 4	MTV Unplugged: Los Tigres del Norte and Friends	Los Tigres del Norte	
September 11	MTV Unplugged: Los Tigres del Norte and Friends	Los Tigres del Norte	
September 18	MTV Unplugged: Los Tigres del Norte and Friends	Los Tigres del Norte	
September 25	MTV Unplugged: Los Tigres del Norte and Friends	Los Tigres del Norte	
October 2	Mi Tributo al Festival	Yuri	
October 9	Independiente	Ricardo Arjona	
October 16	Canciones Que Duelen	Espinoza Paz	
October 23	Desde el Palacio de los Deportes	OV7	
October 30	Mylo Xyloto	Coldplay	
November 6	Under the Mistletoe	Justin Bieber	
November 13	Under the Mistletoe	Justin Bieber	
November 20	21	Adele	
November 27	21	Adele	
December 4	21	Adele	
December 11	Para Mi	Yuridia	
December 18	Para Mi	Yuridia	
December 25	Para Mi	Yuridia	

== See also ==
- List of number-one songs of 2011 (Mexico)
