= Premio Lo Nuestro 2012 =

Latin Music awards show

24th Lo Nuestro Awards
- Date: February 16, 2012
- Location: American Airlines Arena
- Country: USA
- Hosted by: Eduardo Santamarina and Jacqueline Bracamontes

Television/radio coverage
- Network: Univision

Premio Lo Nuestro 2012 was held on Thursday February 16, 2012 at the American Airlines Arena and was broadcast live on the Univision Network. The nominees were announced on December 1, 2011, during a live televised show "Gala de Nominados", hosted by Raúl De Molina and Lili Estefan from El Gordo y la Flaca on Univision Network.

== Special awards ==
Lifetime Achievement Award (Premio Lo Nuestro a la Excelencia)

- Pepe Aguilar

Special Career Achievement Award (Trayectoria Artista del año)

- Don Francisco

== Nominees and winners ==
=== General ===
Category	Winner	Nominees
Premio Lo Nuestro Artist of the Year	Shakira	Don Omar; Larry Hernández; Maná; Tito El Bambino
Collaboration of the Year	Daddy Yankee featuring Prince Royce - "Ven Conmigo"	Alejandra Guzmán featuring Moderatto - "Día de Suerte"; Calibre 50 featuring Gerardo Ortíz - "Culiacán vs Mazatlán"; Ricky Martin featuring Natalia Jiménez - "Lo Mejor De Mi Vida Eres Tu"; Shakira featuring Pitbull - "Rabiosa"

=== Pop ===
Category	Winner	Nominees
Album of the Year	"Sale el Sol" - Shakira	Carlos Baute - Amarte Bien; Gloria Trevi - Gloria; Ricky Martin - Música + Alma + Sexo; Reik - Peligro
Song of the Year	Shakira featuring El Cata- "Rabiosa"	Ricky Martin featuring Natalia Jiménez - "Lo Mejor De Mi Vida Eres Tu"; Gloria Trevi - "Me Río De Ti"; Reik - "Peligro"; Shakira - "Sale el Sol"
Best Male Artist	Enrique Iglesias	Carlos Baute; Chayanne; Ricky Martin
Best Female Artist	Shakira	Gloria Trevi; Natalia Jiménez; Norka
Best Group or Duo	Camila	Alex, Jorge y Lena; Belanova; Reik
Breakout Artist or Duo of the Year	Natalia Jimenez- "Natalia Jimenez"	Christopher Uckermann - Somos; Dulce María - Extranjera Primera Parte

== Rock ==
Category	Winner	Nominees
Album of the Year	Maná - Drama y Luz	Alejandra Guzmán with Moderatto - 20 Años de Éxitos En Vivo con Moderatto; Rita Indiana y los Misterios - El Juidero; Zoé - MTV Unplugged/Música de Fondo; Juanes - P.A.R.C.E.
Song of the Year	Alejandra Guzmán featuring Moderatto - "Día de Suerte"	Maná — Amor Clandestino; Maná — Lluvia al Corazón; Zoé — Soñé; Juanes — Y No Regresas
Artist of the Year	Maná	Alejandra Guzmán; Zoé; Juanes

== Tropical ==
Category	Winner	Nominees
Album of the Year	Tito El Bambino — Invencible	Elvis Crespo — Indestructible; Héctor "El Torito" Acosta — Oblígame; Charlie Cruz — Sigo Aquí; Luis Enrique — Soy y Seré
Song of the Year	Prince Royce - "El Amor Que Perdimos"	Joey Montana - "La Melodía"; Tito El Bambino - "Llama el Sol"; Tito El Bambino - "Llueve el Amor"; Romeo Santos - "You"
Male Artist of the Year	Prince Royce	Juan Luis Guerra; Romeo Santos; Tito El Bambino
Female Artist of the Year	Olga Tanon	La India; Santaye; Sohanny
Group or Duo of the Year	Chino & Nacho	24 Horas; Limi-T 21; Los Aviadores
Breakout Artist or Group of the Year	Monchy y Nathalia- "En Blanco y Negro"	A & C La Banda - En Blanco y Negro; Loisaidas - Loisaidas; Monchy y Nathalia - Monchy y Nathalia; Yunel Cruz - Something Different
Merengue Artist of the Year	Elvis Crespo	Limi-T 21; Los Hermanos Rosario; Sohanny
Tropical Salsa Artist of the Year	Luis Enrique	Charlie Cruz; Gilberto Santa Rosa; Jerry Rivera
Tropical Traditional Artist of the Year	Prince Royce	Juan Luis Guerra; Romeo Santos; Tito El Bambino

== Regional Mexican ==
Category	Winner	Nominees
Album of the Year	Intocable - Intocable 2011	Voz de Mando — Con La Mente En Blanco; Violento — Gracias a Dios; Joan Sebastian — Huevos Rancheros; Chuy Lizarraga y su Banda Tierra Sinaloense — Pistear, Pistear
Song of the Year	Joan Sebastian - El Padrino	La Arrolladora Banda El Limón - "Cuánto Me Cuesta"; Larry Hernández - "El Ardido"; Violento - "Gracias a Dios"; La Addictiva Banda San José de Mesillas - "Te Amo y Te Amo"
Male Artist of the Year	Espinoza Paz	Gerardo Ortíz; Julión Alvarez; Larry Hernández
Female Artist of the Year	Jenni Rivera	Diana Reyes; Ely Quintero; Shaila Dúrcal
Group or Duo of the Year	Intocable	Banda Los Recoditos; La Arrolladora Banda El Limón; La Original Banda el Limón de Salvador Lizarraga; Voz de Mando
Breakout Artist or Group of the Year	Calibre 50 - Renovar o Morir	Alex Rivera - Dime la Razón; Alx Villareal - Regresa; El Bebeto y su Banda Patria Chica - Quiero Que Seas Tu
Duranguense Artist of the Year	K-Paz de la Sierra	Conjunto Atardecer; El Trono de Mexico; Grupo Montéz de Durango
Banda of the Year	Larry Hernández	Julión Alvarez; La Arrolladora Banda El Limón; La Original Banda el Limón de Salvador Lizarraga
Norteño Artist of the Year	Intocable	Gerardo Ortíz; Roberto Tapia; Voz de Mando
Grupera Artist of the Year	Marco Antonio Solís	Grupo Bryndis; La Mar-k de Tierra Caliente; Tierra Cali
Ranchera Artist of the Year	Jenni Rivera	Joan Sebastian; Pedro Fernández; Vicente Fernández

== Urban ==
Category	Winner	Nominees
Album of the Year	Pitbull — Armando	Don Omar — Don Omar Presents: Meet the Orphans; Wisin & Yandel — Los Vaqueros: El Regreso; Gocho — Mi Música; Alexis & Fido — Perreología
Song of the Year	Don Omar - Taboo	Alexis & Fido — Contéstame El Telefono; RKM y Ken-Y - Mi Corazón Esta Muerto; Daddy Yankee featuring Prince Royce — Ven Conmigo; Wisin & Yandel — Zun Zun Rompiendo Caderas
Artist of the Year	Pitbull	Daddy Yankee; Don Omar; Wisin & Yandel

== Video ==
Category	Winner	Nominees
Video of the Year	Wisin & Yandel - Tu Olor	Laura Pausini — Bienvenido; Beatriz Luengo — Como Tu No Hay 2; Belinda — Dopamina; Luis Fonsi — Respira; Sie7e — Tengo Tu Love
