= Día de Suerte =

Single by Alejandra Guzmán

from the album 20 Años de Éxitos En Vivo con Moderatto
- Released: 2 February 2010
- Genre: Latin pop; Pop rock; Rock en español
- Length: 3:32
- Label: EMI
- Songwriters: Alejandra Guzmán; José Luis Ortega
- Producer: Armando Avila

Alejandra Guzmán singles chronology
"Por Qué No Estás Aquí" (2010)	"Día de Suerte" (2010)	"Tan Sólo Tú" (2011)

"Día de Suerte" ("Lucky Day") is a song by Mexican recording artist Alejandra Guzmán. Written by Guzmán and José Luis Ortega and produced by Armando Avila, the track was released on 2 February 2010 as the main theme for the Mexican telenovela Una Familia con Suerte. The song was included in the setlist of Guzmán's live album 20 Años de Éxitos En Vivo con Moderatto (2011) and was performed by the singer and Moderatto. The studio version is featured on the album as a bonus track.

"Día de Suerte" became the sixth top-ten single for Guzmán on Billboard's Latin Pop Songs chart and also peak atop the Mexican Airplay charts. Guzmán won three out of five nominations between the 30th TVyNovelas Awards, the Premio Lo Nuestro 2012 ceremony, and the Premios Oye! for the song.

== Background ==
"Día de Suerte" was written by Mexican singer-songwriter Alejandra Guzmán and José Luis Ortega, produced by Armando Avila, and performed by Guzmán. The song is featured as the main theme for the Mexican telenovela Una Familia con Suerte, produced by Juan Osorio and starring Arath de la Torre, Mayrín Villanueva and Luz Elena González. The telenovela began its broadcasting on February 14, 2011 and featured Guzmán in a supporting role named Viridiana, in honor of her late sister Viridiana Alatriste. The song was released during the accusations made to the singer of having participated in a narcofiesta circa 2006, to which the singer responded: "I do not care about that [the accusations]."

== Recording and release ==
Guzmán found inspiration for the song in the middle of one night and immediately called Juan Osorio with the news. "It was a song I felt, I gave the best of me, but you never know if the audience would like it." Guzmán said. The song was co-written by José Luis Ortega and produced under the guidance of Armando Avila. During the recording of the live album 20 Años de Éxitos En Vivo con Moderatto, Guzmán performed the song for the first time along the band Moderatto who joined her on stage. On the release of 20 Años de Éxitos the studio version of "Día de Suerte" is included as a bonus track.

== Accolades ==
The song won the TVyNovelas Award for Best Musical Theme at the 30th TVyNovelas Awards. Due to Guzmán's absence, Osorio received the award in her name. The track won for Rock Song of the Year at the Premio Lo Nuestro 2012, while the live version, featuring Moderatto, was nominated for Collaboration of the Year. "Día de Suerte" was also nominated for Song of the Year and won for Best Song for Telenovela, Series or Movies at the Mexican Premios Oye!.

== Covers ==
Mexican singer and actress Carmen Sarahí, known for portraying Queen Elsa from Frozen in Latin America, performed a cover of the song on La Voz... México! in 2013, in which Guzmán was her coach.

== Chart performance ==
"Día de Suerte" reached the top of the Billboard Mexico Airplay chart, and peaked at number nine in the Billboard Latin Songs and number two in the Latin Pop Songs charts, becoming Guzmán's sixth top-ten single in the latter chart. For the week of September 24, 2011, Guzmán had two top-ten singles in the Latin Pop Songs chart simultaneously, at number nine "Tan Sólo Tú" (a featured performance with Franco De Vita) and "Día de Suerte" climbing to number two.

== Track listing and formats ==
- Digital download
1. "Día de Suerte" – 3:32
- Mexican iTunes EP
1. "Día de Suerte" – 3:32
2. "Día de Suerte (featuring Moderatto)" – 4:02
3. "Día de Suerte (Giuseppe D Radio Remix)" – 3:20

== Charts ==
=== Weekly charts ===
Chart (2011)	Peak position
Mexico (Monitor Latino)	1

== See also ==
- List of number-one songs of 2011 (Mexico)
