= Entre Tus Alas =

Single by Camila

from the album Dejarte de Amar
- Released: February 5, 2011
- Recorded: 2010
- Genre: Latin pop
- Length: 4:06
- Label: Sony Music Latin
- Songwriters: Mario Domm, Paulyna Carraz
- Producer: Mario Domm

Camila singles chronology
"Bésame" (2010)	"Entre Tus Alas" (2011)	"De mí" (2011)

"Entre tus alas" (English: "Between Your Wings") is a song by Mexican pop group Camila, released on February 5, 2011 as the four single from their second album, Dejarte de Amar (2010). "Entre tus alas" was written by Mario Domm, Paulyna Carraz and produced by Domm. The song reached number two on the US Billboard Latin Pop Airplay charts. This song is also performed a duet with American singer Colbie Caillat.

== Charts ==
Chart (2010)	Peak position
Mexico Top General (Monitor Latino)	1
US Hot Latin Songs (Billboard)	23
US Latin Pop Airplay (Billboard)	2

== Release history ==
Region	Date	Label	Format
United States	February 5, 2011	Sony Music Latin	CD single
United States	February 5, 2011	Sony Music Latin	Digital download

== See also ==
- List of number-one songs of 2011 (Mexico)
