= Héroes del Silencio discography =

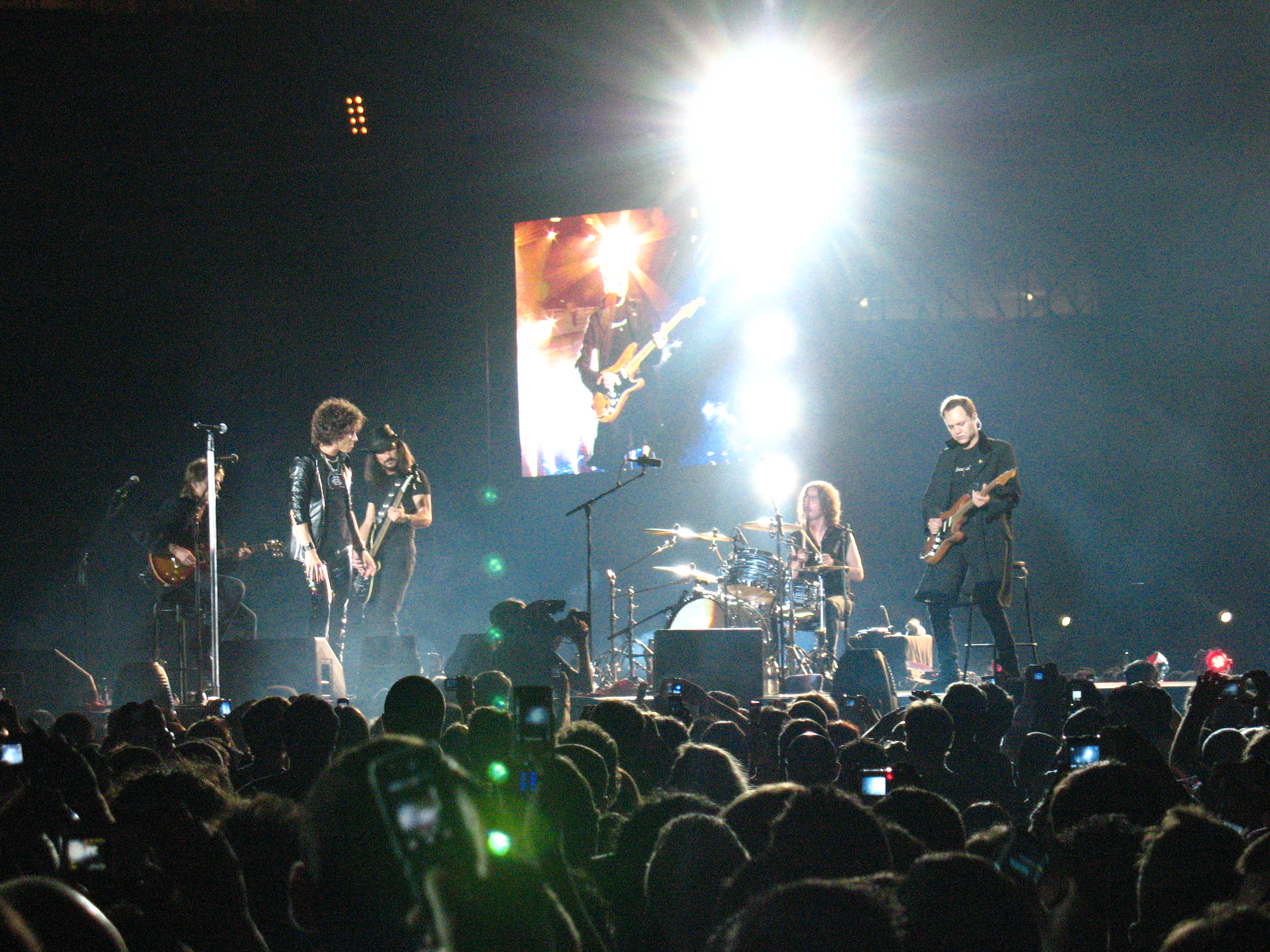
- Studio albums: 4
- Extended plays: 1
- Live albums: 6
- Compilation albums: 7
- Singles: 6
- Box sets: 2

Héroes del Silencio was a Spanish rock band from Zaragoza (Aragon, Spain) formed by Juan Valdivia in 1984. In 1988 they released their official first studio album, El Mar No Cesa, then in 1990 they released their second album Senderos de Traición, El Espíritu del Vino was their third album released in 1993 and in 1995 they released their last studio album to date, the often praised Avalancha.

== Albums ==
=== Studio albums ===
Year	Album details	Peak chart positions				Certifications (sales thresholds)
Year	Album details	SPA	AUT	GER	SWI	Certifications (sales thresholds)
1988	El Mar No Cesa: Released: October 31, 1988; Label: EMI	36	—	—	—	SPA: Platinum
1990	Senderos de traición: Released: December 4, 1990; Label: EMI	1	—	17	40	SPA: 3× Platinum; GER: Platinum; SWI: Platinum
1993	El Espíritu del Vino: Released: June 14 (Spain, Switzerland, and Germany) September 27 (US, Latin America, and Japan); Label: EMI	1	14	9	5	SPA: Platinum; SWI: Gold
1995	Avalancha: Released: September 18, 1995; Label: EMI/IRS	1	25	23	8	SPA: 2× Platinum
"—" denotes releases that did not chart

=== Live albums ===
Year	Album	Peak chart positions		Certifications (sales thresholds)
Year	Album	SPA	MEX	Certifications (sales thresholds)
1989	En Directo	—	—	—
1991	Senda '91	—	—	—
1996	Parasiempre	2	—	SPA:Platinum
2005	El Ruido y la Furia	1	—	SPA: Gold
2007	Tour 2007	3	1	SPA: Gold; MEX: Platinum
2011	Live in Germany	5	—	—
"—" denotes releases that did not chart

=== Compilation albums ===
Year	Album	Peak chart positions	Certifications (sales thresholds)
Year	Album	SPA	Certifications (sales thresholds)
1998	Rarezas	3	SPA:Gold
2000	Canciones 1984-1996	—	SPA:Platinum
2004	Antología Audiovisual	44	SPA: Gold
2006	The Platinum Collection	8	SPA: Gold
2007	Fundamentales	59	—
2013	4 álbumes	82	—
2021	Héroes: Silence and Rock & Roll		
"—" denotes releases that did not chart

== Singles ==
Year	Title	Peak positions			Certifications	Album
Year	Title	SPA	GER	SWI	Certifications	Album
1987	"Heroe de Leyenda"	—	—	—	SPA: Gold	Heroe de Leyenda
1990	"Entre dos tierras"	34	25	40	SPA: Platinum	Senderos de Traición
1990	"Maldito Duende"	—	—	—	SPA: Platinum	Senderos de Traición
1993	"Nuestros nombres"	1	40	—		El Espíritu del Vino
1993	"Los Placeres de la Pobreza"	—	—	—		El Espíritu del Vino
1993	"Flor De Loto"	—	—	—		El Espíritu del Vino
1993	"Sirena Varada"	—	—	—		El Espíritu del Vino
1993	"La Herida"	—	—	—		El Espíritu del Vino
"—" denotes releases that did not chart

== Box sets ==
- Edición del Milenio (1999)
- Tour 2007 Deluxe Box Set (2007)

== Extended plays ==
- Héroe de Leyenda (1987)
