= El Espíritu del Vino =

Studio album by Heroes Del Silencio
- Released: June 14, 1993
- Recorded: 1993 Gallery studio, Chertsey
- Genre: Rock, hard rock
- Length: 71:47
- Language: Spanish
- Label: EMI
- Producer: Phil Manzanera

Heroes Del Silencio chronology
Senda ´91 (1991)	El Espíritu del Vino (1993)	Avalancha (1995)

Japanese Edition Cover

El Espíritu del Vino (Spanish for "The Spirit of Wine") is the third studio album by the Spanish rock band Héroes del Silencio, released in 1993. A double disc special edition was released in December 2006 on EMI. A 20th anniversary edition was released in 2013 with remixed versions of the original tracks including a documentary of the band during their recordings.

== History ==
After a hiatus (vacation) from the long exhausting tour of the Senda tour, the group would return in December 1992. The group would work with producer with Phil Manzanera once again, Manzanera would set the group with a house in Chertsey, England and would begin to write material. Bunbury decided to make it a double album which was above the average compared to their other albums. During this time the group would struggle with drugs and substances and was the starting point where Bunbury and Valdivia would have tension.

It is said that Bunbury first thought and wrote the song, "Sirena Varada" while he was high.

It was also there that Valdivia was playing "Brazos de la fiebre" which would eventually release in Avalancha

Recorded in 1993, the album contains hard rock songs and the lyrics were written by Enrique Bunbury.

The album had five singles: "Nuestros Nombres", "Los Placeres de la Pobreza", "Flor de Loto", "Sirena Varada" and "La Herida". In August 1993, 150,000 copies had been sold on the Spanish market. Due to their success in Germany, the band released one of their festival performances on DVD. The song "Nuestros Nombres" got to first position in the Spanish charts and was a success in other countries as well.

This was the first album to include the first 2 songs of the Bendecida series, the 3rd song being "La chispa adecuada"

After recording and releasing the album, they would commence on a one year tour, "El camino del exceso" tour. Taking them throughout Europe and Latin America

== Track listing ==
All tracks are written by Enrique Bunbury, Joaquin Cardiel, Juan Valdivia, Pedro Andreu.

Original release
No.	Title	Length
1.	"Nuestros nombres" (Our names)	5:57
2.	"Tesoro" (Treasure)	2:19
3.	"Los placeres de la pobreza" (The pleasures of poverty)	4:59
4.	"La herida" (The wound)	6:54
5.	"La sirena varada" (The Stranded Mermaid)	4:15
6.	"La apariencia no es sincera" (The appearance is not sincere)	7:03
7.	"Z"	0:51
8.	"Culpable" (Guilty)	6:04
9.	"El camino del exceso" (The road of excess)	5:36
10.	"Flor de loto" (Lotus flower)	6:15
11.	"El refugio interior" (The internal shelter)	1:34
12.	"Sangre hirviendo" (Boiling blood)	5:12
13.	"Tumbas de sal" (Salt tombs)	4:33
14.	"Bendecida 2" (Blessed 2)	0:36
15.	"Bendecida" (Blessed)	5:59
16.	"La alacena" (The cupboard)	3:40
Total length:		71:47

Special Edition Bonus Disc
No.	Title	Length
1.	"El camino del exceso" (Live From Parasiempre)	5:54
2.	"Sirena varada" (Live From Parasiempre)	4:26
3.	"Nuestros nombres" (Live From Parasiempre)	7:06
4.	"Flor de Loto" (Live From Parasiempre)	6:19
5.	"La herida" (Live From Parasiempre)	4:32
6.	"Apuesta por el Rock ’n’ Roll"	3:51
7.	"Acústica"	3:00
8.	"Nuestros nombres" (Noel Harris Mix)	9:00
9.	"La herida" (Edit)	4:39
10.	"Tesoro" (New Mix)	2:21
11.	"Flor de loto" (Edit)	4:27
12.	"Nuestros nombres" (Edit)	4:01
13.	"El camino del exceso" (New Mix)	4:23
14.	"Nuestros nombres" (Live version 1995 From El Ruido y la Furia)	8:04
Total length:		72:03

== Personnel ==
- Enrique Bunbury - vocalist
- Joaquin Cardiel - Bass guitar
- Juan Valdivia - Guitar
- Pedro Andreu - Drums

=== Additional personnel ===
- Copi Corellano - Organ, piano
- Phil Manzanera - Guitar

== Chart positions ==
Chart	Peak position
Spanish Albums (PROMUSICAE)	1
Austrian Albums (Ö3 Austria)	14
German Albums (Offizielle Top 100)	9
Swiss Albums (Schweizer Hitparade)	5
