= Pequeño (album) =

Pequeño (Little)

Studio album by Enrique Bunbury
- Released: 1999
- Genre: Rock en español
- Label: EMI

Enrique Bunbury chronology
Radical Sonora (1997)	Pequeño (Little) (1999)	Flamingos (2002)

Pequeño is the second album of the solo artist Enrique Bunbury made in 1999. The word pequeño means "little" in Spanish.

== Track listing ==
1. Algo en común (Something in common)
2. Infinito (Infinite)
3. El Extranjero (The foreigner)
4. Solo si me perdonas (Only if you forgive me)
5. El viento a favor (The right wind)
6. Lejos de la tristeza (Far from sadness)
7. Dudar, quizás (Doubt? Maybe)
8. Demasiado tarde (Too late)
9. De mayor (When I'm older)
10. Bailando con el enemigo (Dancing with the enemy)
11. Robinson
12. Contradictorio (Contradictory)

== See also ==
- Enrique Bunbury
- Heroes Del Silencio, Bunbury's band during the 1990s.
