= En Directo =

En Directo may refer to:

- En Directo (EP), a 1989 EP by Héroes Del Silencio
- En Directo (Patricio Rey y sus Redonditos de Ricota album), 1992
