= Radical Sonora =

Studio album by Enrique Bunbury
- Released: 1997
- Genre: Electronic rock, industrial rock
- Label: Chrysalis
- Producer: Phil Manzanera

Enrique Bunbury chronology
Radical Sonora (1997)	Pequeño (1999)

Radical Sonora is Enrique Bunbury's first solo album after his involvement with Heroes Del Silencio. It is an electronic rock album. It was distributed by Chrysalis Records.

== Track listing ==
1. Big-bang
2. Negativo
3. Encadenados
4. Contracorriente
5. Planeta sur
6. Alicia (expulsada al país de las maravillas)
7. Salomé
8. Servidor de nadie
9. Despacio
10. Polen
11. Nueve
12. Alfa

The edition for America does not include track 11, Nueve.

== Charts ==
Chart performance for Radical Sonora
Chart (2024)	Peak position
Spanish Albums (PROMUSICAE)	15

== Certifications ==
Region	Certification	Certified units/sales
Spain (PROMUSICAE)	Platinum	100,000^{^}
^{^} Shipments figures based on certification alone.
