= Tour 2007 =

Live album by Héroes del Silencio
- Released: December 18, 2007
- Recorded: September and October, 2007
- Genre: Spanish rock, hard rock
- Label: EMI

Héroes del Silencio chronology
The Platinum Collection (2006)	Tour 2007 (2007)	Live in Germany (2011)

Tour 2007 is a live album released in 2007 by the Spanish rock band Héroes del Silencio. It was recorded during their 2007 Reunion Tour. Although their last performance, Live in Germany would be their latest release until 2021 with Héroes: Silence and Rock & Roll.

The album contains two CDs and two DVDs, autographed drum-sticks and picks, official backstage passes and a 60 cm x 40 cm poster. Fifth Hero guitarist Alan Boguslavsky was replaced on this tour by Juan Valdivia's younger brother Gonzalo Valdivia.

== Reception ==
Professional ratings
Review scores
Source	Rating
AllMusic	3.5/5 stars

The album peaked at position three on the Spanish albums chart and was a top hit in the Mexican charts. AllMusic's reviewer praised the sound quality of the recording, and found that the album "serves well as a greatest-hits retrospective." The album received a Latin Grammy nomination for Best Rock Album by a Duo or Group with Vocal.

== Track listing ==
=== CDs ===
Disc 1
No.	Title	Length
1.	"El Estanque"	4:40
2.	"Deshacer El Mundo"	5:33
3.	"Mar Adentro"	4:10
4.	"La Carta"	3:13
5.	"Agosto"	4:31
6.	"La Sirena Varada"	4:26
7.	"Opio"	6:01
8.	"La Herida"	4:56
9.	"Flor Venenosa"	4:20
10.	"Despertar"	3:48
11.	"Apuesta Por El Rock ´n´ Roll"	3:57
12.	"Héroe De Leyenda"	5:13
13.	"Con Nombre De Guerra"	4:21
14.	"No Más Lagrimas"	6:30

Disc 2
No.	Title	Length
1.	"Nuestros Nombres"	6:16
2.	"El Mar No Cesa"	3:17
3.	"Entre Dos Tierras"	6:02
4.	"Maldito Duende"	5:13
5.	"Iberia Sumergida"	5:32
6.	"Avalancha"	6:30
7.	"Bendecida"	5:09
8.	"Tumbas De Sal"	5:35
9.	"Oración"	4:32
10.	"Tesoro"	2:52
11.	"Malas Intenciones"	4:28
12.	"La Chispa Adecuada"	5:24
13.	"Fuente Esperanza"	4:51
14.	"En Brazos De La Fiebre"	5:48

=== DVDs ===
Disc 1

1. "El Estanque"
2. "Deshacer El Mundo"
3. "Mar Adentro"
4. "La Carta"
5. "La Sirena Varada"
6. "Opio"
7. "Presentación"
8. "La Herida"
9. "Apuesta Por El Rock ´n´ Roll"
10. "Héroe De Leyenda"
11. "Con Nombre De Guerra"
12. "No Más Lágrimas"
13. "Nuestros Nombres"
14. "El Mar No Cesa"
15. "Entre Dos Tierras"
16. "Maldito Duende"
17. "Iberia Sumergida"
18. "Avalancha"
19. "Oración"
20. "La Chispa Adecuada"
21. "Tesoro"
22. "En Brazos De La Fiebre"

Disc 2

1. Vuelo Privado (Documentary)
2. GUATEMALA: "Agosto"
3. BUENOS AIRES: "Fuente Esperanza"
4. MONTERREY: "Flor Venenosa"
5. LOS ANGELES: "Bendecida"
6. ZARAGOZA: "Malas Intenciones"
7. SEVILLA: "Tumbas De Sal"
8. VALENCIA: "Despertar"
9. MEXICO DF: "Iberia Sumergida" (Easter Egg)

== Personnel ==
- Enrique Bunbury - vocalist
- Joaquin Cardiel - Bass
- Gonzalo Valdivia - Rhythm guitar
- Juan Valdivia - Lead guitar
- Pedro Andreu - Drums

== Chart performance ==
Chart (2007)	Peak position
Spanish Albums (PROMUSICAE)	3
Mexican Albums (Top 100 Mexico)	1
