= List of number-one songs of 2010 (Mexico) =

This is a list of the songs that reached number one in Mexico in 2010, according to Monitor Latino.

Monitor Latino's chart rankings are based on airplay across radio states in Mexico utilizing the Radio Tracking Data, LLC in real time. Charts are ranked from Monday to Sunday. Besides the General chart, Monitor Latino published "Pop", "Regional Mexican" and "Anglo" charts.

== Chart history ==
=== General ===
In 2010, nine songs reached number one on the General chart; all of these songs were entirely in Spanish. Four acts achieved their first number-one song in Mexico: Camila, Enrique Iglesias, Juan Luis Guerra and Marco Antonio Solís.

"Mientes" by Camila and "Cuando me enamoro" by Enrique Iglesias & Juan Luis Guerra were the longest-running General number-ones of the year, both staying at the top position for thirteen consecutive weeks each. "Cuando me enamoro" was also the best-performing song of the year.

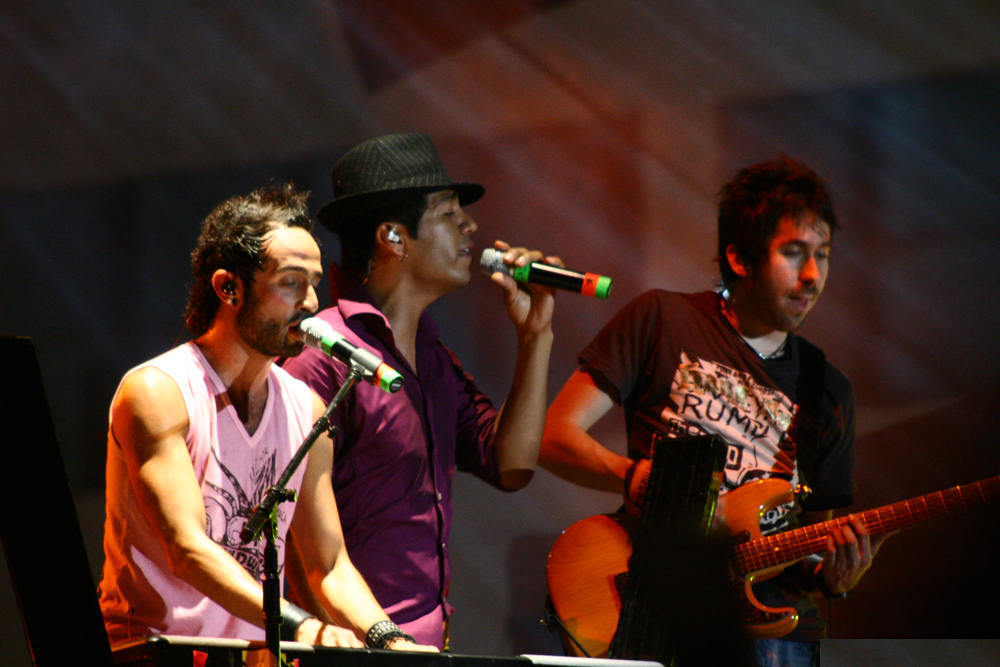
Mexican pop rock band Camila (pictured) had three number-one songs throughout the year. They spent 25 weeks at the #1 position, surpassing Javier Solís' 21 weeks at the top of the charts in 1962.

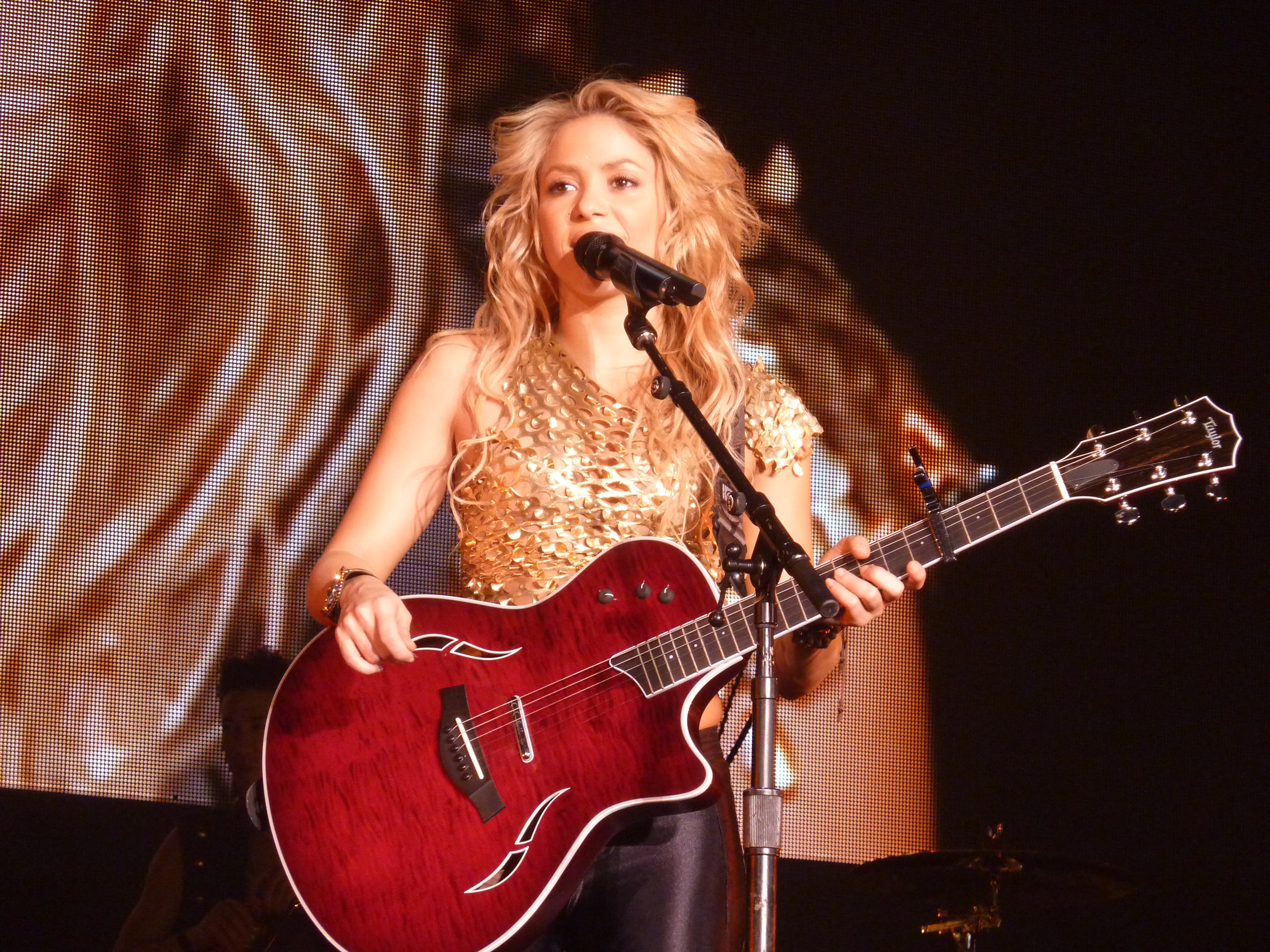
Colombian singer-songwriter Shakira (pictured) earned her second #1 song with "Gitana".

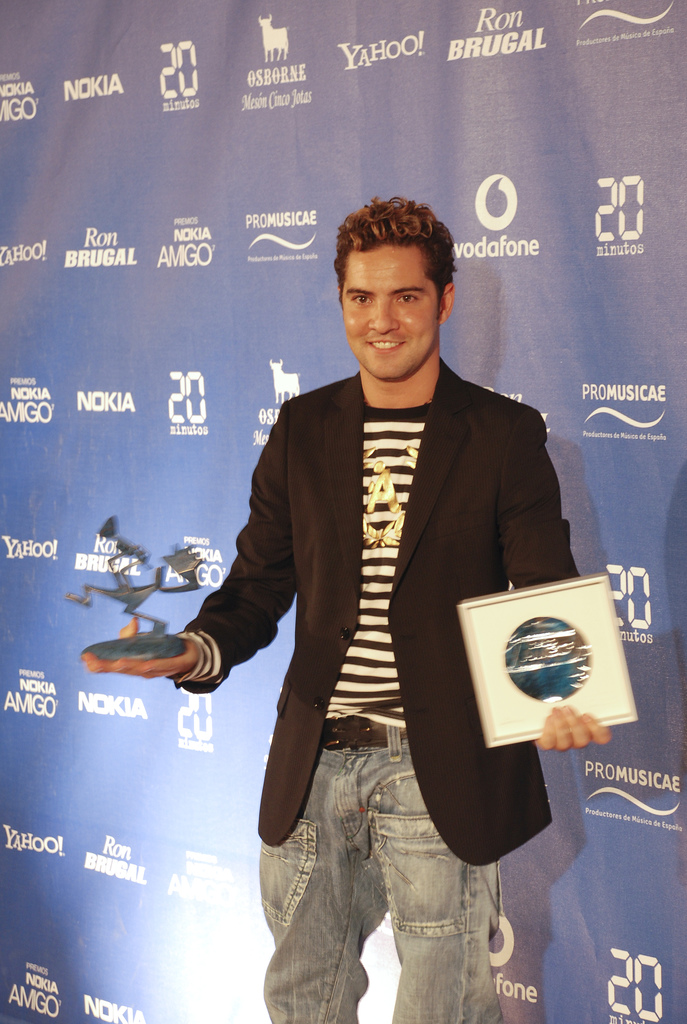
Spanish singer David Bisbal (pictured) earned his second #1 song with "Mi princesa".

The yellow background indicates the best-performing song of 2010.

| Issue date | Song | Artist(s) | Ref. |
|---|---|---|---|
| January 3 | "Estuve" | Alejandro Fernández | |
| January 10 | "Mientes" | Camila | |
| January 17 | "Mientes" | Camila | |
| January 24 | "Mientes" | Camila | |
| January 31 | "Mientes" | Camila | |
| February 7 | "Mientes" | Camila | |
| February 14 | "Mientes" | Camila | |
| February 21 | "Mientes" | Camila | |
| February 28 | "Mientes" | Camila | |
| March 7 | "Mientes" | Camila | |
| March 14 | "Mientes" | Camila | |
| March 21 | "Mientes" | Camila | |
| March 28 | "Mientes" | Camila | |
| April 4 | "Mientes" | Camila | |
| April 11 | "Gitana" | Shakira | |
| April 18 | "Gitana" | Shakira | |
| April 25 | "Gitana" | Shakira | |
| May 2 | "Mi princesa" | David Bisbal | |
| May 9 | "Mi princesa" | David Bisbal | |
| May 16 | "Mi princesa" | David Bisbal | |
| May 23 | "Gitana" | Shakira | |
| May 30 | "Aléjate de mí" | Camila | |
| June 6 | "Aléjate de mí" | Camila | |
| June 13 | "Aléjate de mí" | Camila | |
| June 20 | "Aléjate de mí" | Camila | |
| June 27 | "Aléjate de mí" | Camila | |
| July 4 | "Cuando me enamoro" | Enrique Iglesias & Juan Luis Guerra | |
| July 11 | "Cuando me enamoro" | Enrique Iglesias & Juan Luis Guerra | |
| July 18 | "Cuando me enamoro" | Enrique Iglesias & Juan Luis Guerra | |
| July 25 | "Cuando me enamoro" | Enrique Iglesias & Juan Luis Guerra | |
| August 1 | "Cuando me enamoro" | Enrique Iglesias & Juan Luis Guerra | |
| August 8 | "Cuando me enamoro" | Enrique Iglesias & Juan Luis Guerra | |
| August 15 | "Cuando me enamoro" | Enrique Iglesias & Juan Luis Guerra | |
| August 22 | "Cuando me enamoro" | Enrique Iglesias & Juan Luis Guerra | |
| August 29 | "Cuando me enamoro" | Enrique Iglesias & Juan Luis Guerra | |
| September 5 | "Cuando me enamoro" | Enrique Iglesias & Juan Luis Guerra | |
| September 12 | "Cuando me enamoro" | Enrique Iglesias & Juan Luis Guerra | |
| September 19 | "Cuando me enamoro" | Enrique Iglesias & Juan Luis Guerra | |
| September 26 | "Cuando me enamoro" | Enrique Iglesias & Juan Luis Guerra | |
| October 3 | "¿A donde vamos a parar?" | Marco Antonio Solís | |
| October 10 | "¿A donde vamos a parar?" | Marco Antonio Solís | |
| October 17 | "Bésame" | Camila | |
| October 24 | "Bésame" | Camila | |
| October 31 | "Bésame" | Camila | |
| November 7 | "Bésame" | Camila | |
| November 14 | "Bésame" | Camila | |
| November 21 | "Bésame" | Camila | |
| November 28 | "Bésame" | Camila | |
| December 5 | "Bésame" | Camila | |
| December 12 | "Bésame" | Camila | |
| December 19 | "Tú sabes quién" | Alejandro Fernández | |
| December 26 | "Tú sabes quién" | Alejandro Fernández | |

=== Pop ===
| Issue date | Song | Artist(s) | Ref. |
|---|---|---|---|
| January 31 | "Mientes" | Camila | |
| February 14 | "Mientes" | Camila | |
| March 14 | "Mientes" | Camila | |
| March 21 | "Mientes" | Camila | |
| April 4 | "Mientes" | Camila | |
| April 11 | "Gitana" | Shakira | |
| April 18 | "Gitana" | Shakira | |
| April 25 | "Gitana" | Shakira | |
| May 2 | "Gitana" | Shakira | |
| May 9 | "Gitana" | Shakira | |
| May 16 | "Aléjate de mí" | Camila | |
| May 23 | "Aléjate de mí" | Camila | |
| May 30 | "Aléjate de mí" | Camila | |
| June 6 | "Aléjate de mí" | Camila | |
| June 13 | "Aléjate de mí" | Camila | |
| June 20 | "Aléjate de mí" | Camila | |
| June 27 | "Aléjate de mí" | Camila | |
| July 4 | "Aléjate de mí" | Camila | |
| September 5 | "Cuando me enamoro" | Enrique Iglesias & Juan Luis Guerra | |
| September 12 | "Cuando me enamoro" | Enrique Iglesias & Juan Luis Guerra | |
| September 26 | "Tu voz" | Erik Rubín | |
| October 3 | "Tu voz" | Erik Rubín | |
| October 17 | "Bésame" | Camila | |
| October 24 | "Bésame" | Camila | |
| November 7 | "Bésame" | Camila | |
| November 14 | "Bésame" | Camila | |
| December 19 | "Bésame" | Camila | |
| December 26 | "Bésame" | Camila | |

=== Regional ===
| Issue date | Song | Artist(s) | Ref. |
|---|---|---|---|
| January 31 | "Me gusta todo de ti" | Banda el Recodo | |
| February 7 | "Me gusta todo de ti" | Banda el Recodo | |
| February 14 | "Me gusta todo de ti" | Banda el Recodo | |
| March 14 | "Me gusta todo de ti" | Banda el Recodo | |
| March 21 | "Más adelante" | La Arrolladora Banda El Limón | |
| March 28 | "Bandida" | Alejandro Fernández | |
| April 4 | "Bandida" | Alejandro Fernández | |
| April 11 | "Bandida" | Alejandro Fernández | |
| April 18 | "Bandida" | Alejandro Fernández | |
| April 25 | "Bandida" | Alejandro Fernández | |
| May 2 | "Bandida" | Alejandro Fernández | |
| May 9 | "Dime que me quieres" | Banda el Recodo | |
| May 16 | "Dime que me quieres" | Banda el Recodo | |
| May 23 | "Dime que me quieres" | Banda el Recodo | |
| June 20 | "Dime que me quieres" | Banda el Recodo | |
| June 27 | "Dime que me quieres" | Banda el Recodo | |
| July 4 | "Dime que me quieres" | Banda el Recodo | |
| September 5 | "Niña de mi corazón" | La Arrolladora Banda El Limón | |
| September 12 | "¿A donde vamos a parar?" | Marco Antonio Solís | |
| September 26 | "¿A donde vamos a parar?" | Marco Antonio Solís | |
| October 3 | "¿A donde vamos a parar?" | Marco Antonio Solís | |
| October 24 | "¿A donde vamos a parar?" | Marco Antonio Solís | |
| November 14 | "¿A donde vamos a parar?" | Marco Antonio Solís | |
| December 19 | "Te amo y te amo" | La Adictiva Banda San José de Mesillas | |
| December 26 | "Disponible para mí" | La Arrolladora Banda El Limón | |

=== English ===
| Issue date | Song | Artist(s) | Ref. |
|---|---|---|---|
| January 31 | "Bad Romance" | Lady Gaga | |
| February 7 | "Bad Romance" | Lady Gaga | |
| February 14 | "Bad Romance" | Lady Gaga | |
| March 14 | "Bad Romance" | Lady Gaga | |
| March 21 | "Bad Romance" | Lady Gaga | |
| March 28 | "Bad Romance" | Lady Gaga | |
| April 4 | "Tik Tok" | Kesha | |
| April 11 | "Tik Tok" | Kesha | |
| April 18 | "Tik Tok" | Kesha | |
| April 25 | "Tik Tok" | Kesha | |
| May 2 | "Telephone" | Lady Gaga ft. Beyoncé | |
| May 9 | "Telephone" | Lady Gaga ft. Beyoncé | |
| May 16 | "Telephone" | Lady Gaga ft. Beyoncé | |
| May 23 | "Telephone" | Lady Gaga ft. Beyoncé | |
| June 20 | "Telephone" | Lady Gaga ft. Beyoncé | |
| June 27 | "Telephone" | Lady Gaga ft. Beyoncé | |
| July 4 | "Gettin' Over You" | David Guetta & Chris Willis ft. Fergie & LMFAO | |
| September 5 | "Alejandro" | Lady Gaga | |
| September 12 | "Alejandro" | Lady Gaga | |
| October 3 | "Alejandro" | Lady Gaga | |
| October 24 | "Alejandro" | Lady Gaga | |
| November 7 | "Alejandro" | Lady Gaga | |
| November 14 | "Love the Way You Lie" | Eminem | |
| December 19 | "The Time (Dirty Bit)" | The Black Eyed Peas | |
| December 26 | "The Time (Dirty Bit)" | The Black Eyed Peas | |

== See also ==
- List of number-one albums of 2010 (Mexico)
- List of top 20 songs for 2010 in Mexico
