= List of top 20 songs for 2010 in Mexico =

This is a list of the top 20 songs of 2010 in Mexico according to Monitor Latino. Monitor Latino also issued separate year-end charts for Regional Mexican, Pop and Anglo songs.

№	Title	Artist(s)
1	"Cuando me enamoro"	Enrique Iglesias & Juan Luis Guerra
2	"Aléjate de mí"	Camila
3	"Mientes"	Camila
4	"Colgando en tus manos"	Carlos Baute ft. Marta Sánchez
5	"Tu voz"	Erik Rubín
6	"Dime que me quieres"	Banda el Recodo
7	"Niña de mi corazón"	La Arrolladora Banda El Limón
8	"Loca"	Shakira
9	"Qué será de tí"	Thalía
10	"Me enamoré de tí"	Chayanne
11	"Niña bonita"	Chino & Nacho
12	"La María"	Julión Álvarez y su Norteño Banda
13	"Mi princesa"	David Bisbal
14	"Bad Romance"	Lady Gaga
15	"El enamorado"	Los Titanes de Durango
16	"¿Quién de los dos será?"	Diego Verdaguer
17	"Aún pienso en tí"	Playa Limbo
18	"Meet Me Halfway"	Black Eyed Peas
19	"¿A dónde vamos a parar?"	Marco Antonio Solís
20	"Equivocada"	Thalía

== See also ==
- List of number-one songs of 2010 (Mexico)
- List of number-one albums of 2010 (Mexico)
