= List of number-one albums of 2010 (Mexico) =

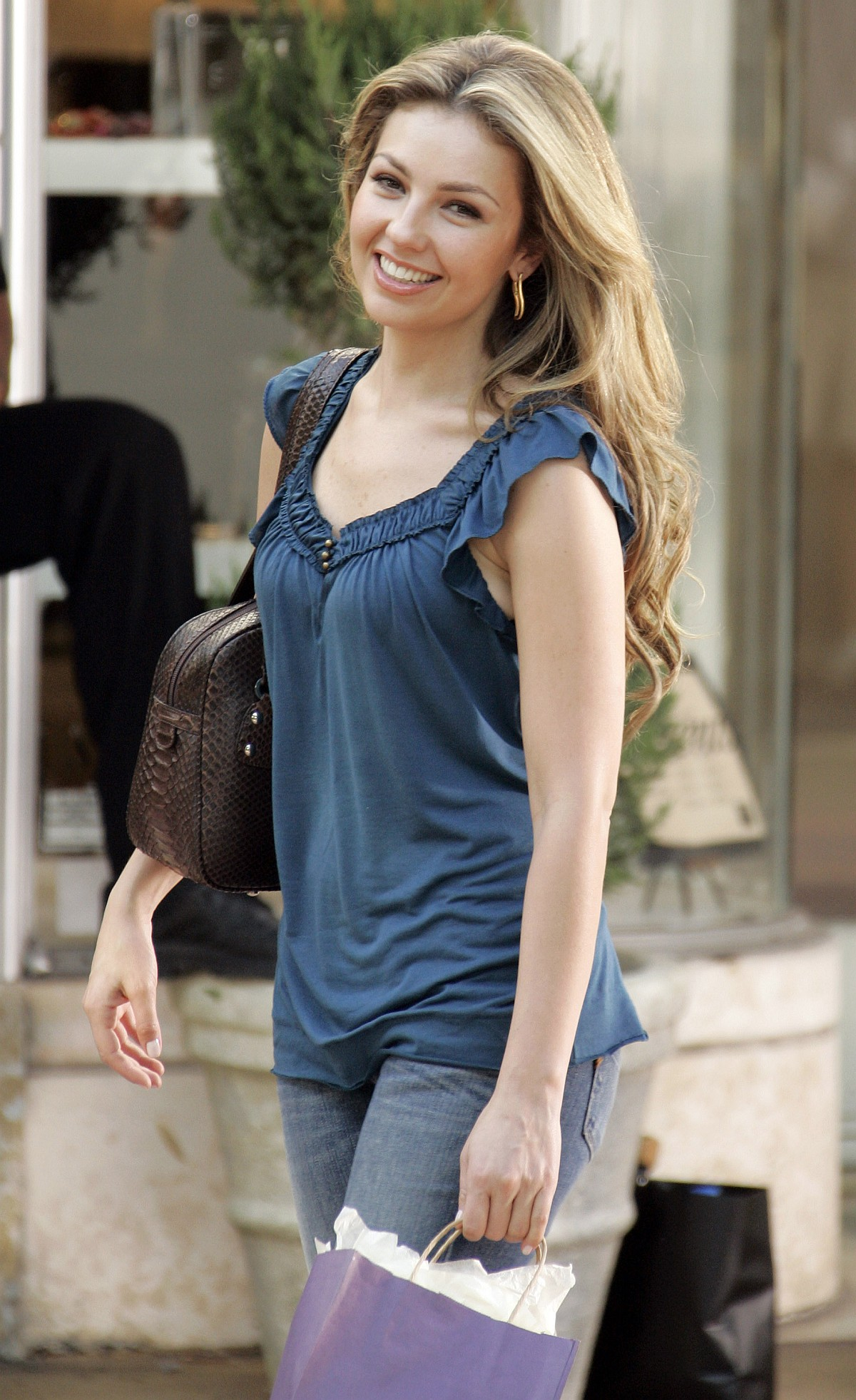
Mexican singer Thalía peaked at number-one with her album Primera Fila in 2009 and 2010.

Top 100 Mexico is a record chart published weekly by AMPROFON (Asociación Mexicana de Productores de Fonogramas y Videogramas), a non-profit organization composed by Mexican and multinational record companies. This association tracks record sales (physical and digital) in Mexico.

In 2010, nineteen albums reached number-one. Dos Mundos: Evolución by Alejandro Fernández and Primera Fila, a live album recorded by Thalía, both reached the top spot of the chart in 2009. Dos Mundos is also the first number-one album of 2010. Amar y Querer: Homenaje a las Grandes Canciones by Kalimba, a cover album with music standards received a Gold certification in Mexico. The album includes songs previously recorded by José José, Raphael, Emmanuel and Frank Sinatra. Who I Am, by Nick Jonas and the Administration debuted at number 3 in the Billboard 200 in the United States with first week sales of 82,000 units. The album also debuted at number 3 in the Mexican chart, reaching the top the following week. The second studio album released by Mexican band Camila, Dejarte de Amar, debuted at number-one in the Billboard Top Latin Songs chart in the United States and also on this chart. The album was awarded with a Gold certification in Mexico on the first day of sales, with 30,000 units sold. Camila's album was replaced at number-one with the debut of the sixth studio album by Spanish singer-songwriter Bunbury titled Las consecuencias. The album also debuted at the top of the charts in Spain. Las consecuencias was awarded with a Platinum certification in Mexico.

== Albums ==
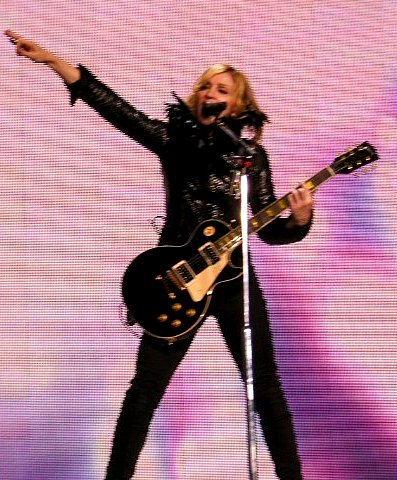
The Sticky & Sweet Tour by Madonna reached number 1 in the spring

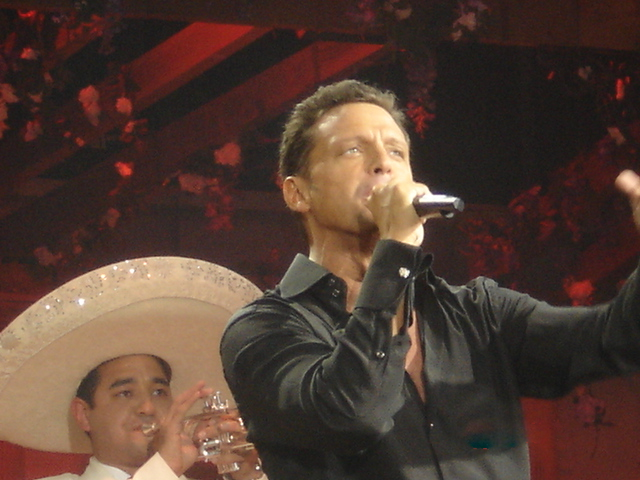
Luis Miguel's album was the highest debut with 240,000 copies in first week

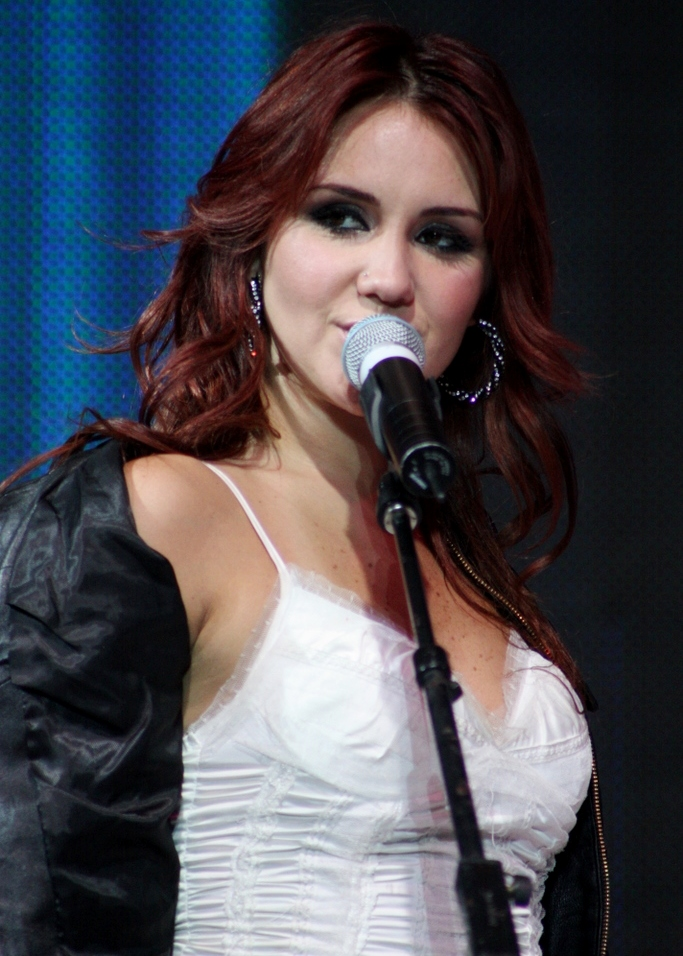
Dulce María's album, Extranjera, made Mexican chart history by registering the largest drop in chart positions for a number-one album by falling 23 places to number 24.

The yellow background indicates the best-performing album of 2010.

Chart date	Album	Artist	Reference
January 4	Dos Mundos: Evolución	Alejandro Fernández	
January 11	Dos Mundos: Evolución	Alejandro Fernández	
January 18	Primera Fila	Thalía	
January 25	Amar y Querer: Homenaje a las Grandes; Canciones	Kalimba	
February 1	Amar y Querer: Homenaje a las Grandes; Canciones	Kalimba	
February 8	Who I Am	Nick Jonas & the Administration	
February 15	Dejarte de Amar	Camila	
Febrero 22	Las consecuencias	Enrique Bunbury	
March 1	Dejarte de Amar	Camila	
March 8	No Hay Imposibles	Chayanne	
March 15	Dejarte de Amar	Camila	
March 21	Dejarte de Amar	Camila	
March 28	Dejarte de Amar	Camila	
April 4	Sticky & Sweet Tour	Madonna	
April 11	Dejarte de Amar	Camila	
April 18	Dejarte de Amar	Camila	
April 25	Primera Fila	Thalía	
May 2	Primera Fila	Thalía	
May 9	Primera Fila	Thalía	
May 16	Primera Fila	Thalía	
May 23	Primera Fila	Thalía	
May 30	Primera Fila	Thalía	
June 6	Primera Fila	Thalía	
June 13	Desde La Cantina Vol. 2	Pesado	
June 20	Desde La Cantina Vol. 2	Pesado	
June 27	Desde La Cantina Vol. 2	Pesado	
July 4	Desde La Cantina Vol. 2	Pesado	
July 11	Euphoria	Enrique Iglesias	
July 18	Euphoria	Enrique Iglesias	
July 25	Euphoria	Enrique Iglesias	
August 1	Dejarte de Amar	Camila	
August 8	Euphoria	Enrique Iglesias	
August 15	Euphoria	Enrique Iglesias	
August 22	The Final Frontier	Iron Maiden	
August 29	Poquita Ropa	Ricardo Arjona	
September 5	Poquita Ropa	Ricardo Arjona	
September 12	Luis Miguel	Luis Miguel	
September 19	Luis Miguel	Luis Miguel	
September 26	Luis Miguel	Luis Miguel	
October 3	Primera Fila	OV7	
October 10	Primera Fila	OV7	
October 17	Primera Fila	OV7	
October 24	Sale el Sol	Shakira	
October 31	Sale el Sol	Shakira	
November 7	Sale el Sol	Shakira	
November 14	Extranjera	Dulce María	
November 21	Amante de lo Bueno	María José	
November 28	Panda MTV Unplugged	PXNDX	
December 5	Viva el príncipe	Cristian Castro	
December 12	Viva el príncipe	Cristian Castro	
December 19	Viva el príncipe	Cristian Castro	
December 26	Viva el príncipe	Cristian Castro	

== See also ==
- List of number-one songs of 2010 (Mexico)
