= Senderos de traición =

Studio album by Héroes del Silencio
- Released: 4 December 1990
- Recorded: 1990
- Studios: Kirios Studios (Madrid, Spain)
- Genres: Gothic rock, hard rock
- Length: 45:46
- Language: Spanish
- Label: EMI
- Producer: Phil Manzanera

Héroes del Silencio chronology
| En Directo (1989) | Senderos de traición (1990) | Senda ´91 (1991) |

Senderos de traición (Spanish: Paths of Betrayal) is the second studio album by the Spanish rock band Héroes del Silencio, released the December 4 1990. The album was especially successful in Spain and Germany. In August 1993, 750,000 copies had been sold worldwide, half of which were sales in Spain.

== Track listing ==
All tracks are written by Enrique Bunbury, Juan Valdivia, Joaquin Cardiel, and Pedro Andreu.

| No. | Title | Length |
|---|---|---|
| 1. | "Entre dos tierras [Between two lands]" | 6:09 |
| 2. | "Maldito duende [Damned goblin]" | 4:13 |
| 3. | "La carta [The letter]" | 3:07 |
| 4. | "Malas intenciones [Bad intentions]" | 3:50 |
| 5. | "Sal [Salt]" | 0:11 |
| 6. | "Senda [Path]" | 3:59 |
| 7. | "Hechizo [Spell]" | 4:37 |
| 8. | "Oración [Prayer]" | 4:09 |
| 9. | "Despertar [Awakening]" | 2:59 |
| 10. | "Decadencia [Decline]" | 4:17 |
| 11. | "Con nombre de guerra [With a war name]" | 4:17 |
| 12. | "El cuadro II [The painting II]" | 4:07 |

- The Latin American release includes the song Héroe De Leyenda (originally released in the album El Mar No Cesa as the final track (track 11 in vinyl and track 13 in CD)), in track 7 between the songs Senda and Hechizo, but also excluding El Cuadro II
- This edition was released in 1992, when the band carried out the tour in Latin America
- In both the cassette and vinyl editions Héroe De Leyenda and El Cuadro II were excluded, leaving these editions with only 11 songs.

== Chart performance and certifications ==
| Charts | Peak position | Certifications | Sales |
|---|---|---|---|
| Spain | 1 | 3× Platinum | 500,000 |
| Germany | 17 | 1× Gold, 1× Platinum | |
| Switzerland | 40 | 1× Gold, 1× Platinum | |

== Personnel ==
- Enrique Bunbury - vocalist
- Joaquin Cardiel - bass
- Juan Valdivia - guitar
- Pedro Andreu - drums

== Usage in media ==
The songs "Maldito duende", "Entre dos tierras" and "Hechizo" were played in the 2017 Spanish horror film Véronica.

The song "Entre dos tierras" was used in the American professional wrestling company Extreme Championship Wrestling by the tag team Blue World Order International (TAKA Michinoku, Men's Teioh and Dick Togo) at the ECW Barely Legal event
