= Héroes: Silencio y Rock & Roll =

Héroes: Silencio and Rock & Roll

Compilation album by Héroes del Silencio
- Released: 30 April 2021
- Recorded: 1987–1996, 2007, 2021
- Genre: Rock, pop
- Label: Warner Music Spain

Héroes del Silencio chronology
Live in Germany (2011)	Héroes: Silencio and Rock & Roll (2021)

Héroes: Silencio y Rock & Roll is a compilation album by Héroes del Silencio that was released in April 2021 alongside the Netflix documentary Heroes: Silence and Rock & Roll. The album includes the band's greatest hits, new mixes of songs from 2000, live performances of "El Mar no Cesa" and "Decadencia" from Senda '91, live performance of "Iberia sumergida" from the 1996 MTV Rock am ring, live performance of "La chispa adecuada" from Tour 2007, and ripped audio clips from the documentary.

The album was released on two CDs and double vinyl.

== Track listing ==
=== Disc 1 ===
1. "Héroe de leyenda" (New mix)
2. "El mar no cesa" (Live, 1991 - Senda 91')
3. "Mar adentro"
4. "Hace tiempo"
5. "El estanque"
6. "Flor venenosa"
7. "Juan Valdivia y Entre dos tierras - Interludio" (Documentary Audio)
8. "Entre dos tierras" (Edited)
9. "Malidito Duende"
10. "Hechizo"
11. "Despertar"
12. "Con nombre de guerra"

=== Disc 2 ===
1. "Malas intenciones"
2. "Oración"
3. "Flor de loto"
4. "Nuestros nombres"
5. "La herida"
6. "La sirena varada"
7. "Los placeres de la pobreza"
8. "Decadencia" (Live, 1991 - Senda 91')
9. "¿Por qué Avalancha? - Interludio" (Documentary Audio)
10. "Avalancha"
11. "En brazos de la fiebre"
12. "Iberia Sumergida" (Live, 1996 - MTV Rock am ring)
13. "Vuelven - Interludio" (Documentary Audio)
14. "La chispa adecuada" (Live, 2007 - Tour 2007)
15. "¡Hėroes, hėroes! - Interludio" (Documentary Audio)
16. "Apuesta por el R'n'R (Rock 'n' roll) (cover of Mas Birras)

NOTE: Vinyl has the same list but without the documentary audio

== Charts ==
Chart (2021)	Peak position
Spanish Albums (PROMUSICAE)	87
