= Avalancha =

Studio album by Héroes del Silencio
- Released: 18 September 1995
- Recorded: Various Locations; Los Angeles, California
- Genre: Hard rock, rock
- Length: 58:35
- Language: Spanish
- Label: EMI
- Producer: Bob Ezrin

Héroes del Silencio chronology
El Espíritu del Vino (1993)	Avalancha (1995)	Parasiempre (1996)

Professional ratings
Review scores
Source	Rating
Allmusic	3/5 stars

Avalancha (Spanish for "Avalanche") is the fourth and final studio album released by Spanish rock band Héroes del Silencio in 1995. It is the only album in which Mexican guitarist Alan Bogulavsky plays as a full-time member of the band. It is considered a turning point in the Rock en Español movement of the 90's and a classic in its own right. It was produced by Bob Ezrin (Lou Reed, Pink Floyd, Peter Gabriel, Alice Cooper, Kansas, Kiss, etc.) and recorded mostly in different studios in the Los Angeles area. It was followed by a very successful 18-month world tour after which the band went on hiatus until the announcement of a 10 date world tour in early 2007.

== Reception ==
The album reached the top position in the Spanish album charts and scored positions among the top 20 in three other European countries. The video for the single "La Chispa Adecuada" was chosen as 'video of the year' at the 1996 Billboard Latin Music Awards.

== In other media ==
The title track appears as a bonus song in the game Guitar Hero III: Legends of Rock and in the European version of Guitar Hero: On Tour.

In 2016 Mexican electro act Moenia interpolate fragments of the song "La Chispa Adecuada (Bendecida III)" for their track "Todo mal" featured on their latest release "Fantom".

== Track listing ==
All tracks are written by Enrique Bunbury, Juan Valdivia, Joaquin Cardiel, Pedro Andreu, Alan Boguslavsky.

No.	Title	Length
1.	"Derivas" (Drifts)	0:59
2.	"¡Rueda, Fortuna!" (Roll, Fortune!)	4:09
3.	"Deshacer el Mundo" (Undo The World)	4:47
4.	"Iberia Sumergida" (Submerged Iberia)	5:17
5.	"Avalancha" (Avalanche)	5:56
6.	"En Brazos de la Fiebre" (In the Arms of Fever)	4:45
7.	"Parasiempre" (Forever)	4:05
8.	"La Chispa Adecuada (Bendecida III)" (The Suitable Spark) (Blessed III)	5:28
9.	"Días de Borrasca (Víspera de Resplandores)" (Days of Storm) (Eve of Splendors)	6:24
10.	"Morir Todavía" (To Die Yet)	4:14
11.	"Opio" (Opium)	6:18
12.	"La Espuma de Venus" (Venus' Foam)	6:13

== Personnel ==
- Alan Boguslavsky - Rhythm guitar
- Enrique Bunbury - vocalist
- Joaquin Cardiel - Bass
- Juan Valdivia - Lead guitar
- Pedro Andreu - Drums

== Charts ==
Chart	Peak position
Spanish Albums (PROMUSICAE)	1
Austrian Albums (Ö3 Austria)	25
German Albums (Offizielle Top 100)	23
Swiss Albums (Schweizer Hitparade)	8

== Sales ==
Region	Certification	Certified units/sales
Spain Sales as of 1995	—	100,000
