= Las Consecuencias =

Studio album by Bunbury
- Released: 16 February 2010
- Genre: Rock in Spanish, Acoustic, Folk-rock
- Length: 52:53
- Label: EMI Music Spain

Bunbury chronology
Hellville de Luxe (2008)	Las Consecuencias (2010)

Las Consecuencias ("The Consequences") is an album by former Heroes Del Silencio front-man and lead vocalist, Enrique Bunbury.

== Track listing ==
The album comprises 11 songs.

No.	Title	Length
1.	"Las Consecuencias (Asustar un Poco)"	5:37
2.	"Ella Me Dijo Que No"	4:18
3.	"El Boxeador"	5:49
4.	"Frente a Frente"	3:54
5.	"21 de Octubre"	4:43
6.	"Lo Que Más Te Gustó de Mi"	3:55
7.	"Los Habitantes"	5:44
8.	"Es Hora de Hablar"	4:31
9.	"De Todo el Mundo"	4:59
10.	"Nunca Se Convence del Todo a Nadie de Nada"	5:20
11.	"Los Amantes"	4:02

== Certifications ==
Region	Certification	Certified units/sales
Mexico (AMPROFON)	Platinum	60,000^{^}
^{^} Shipments figures based on certification alone.
