= Parasiempre =

Live album by Héroes del Silencio
- Released: 28 September 1996
- Recorded: 8 June 1996 Zaragoza; 7 June 1996 Madrid
- Genre: Hard rock, Latin rock
- Label: EMI

Héroes del Silencio chronology
Avalancha (1995)	Parasiempre (1996)	Rarezas (1998)

Professional ratings
Review scores
Source	Rating
AllMusic	4/5 stars

Parasiempre is a live album by the Spanish rock band Héroes del Silencio issued after the "Avalancha Tour" in 1996, where the group performed in Europe, South America and North America. The title is taken from a song of the album Avalancha. The first part of the album was recorded on June 8, 1996 in Zaragoza and the second part on 7 June 1996 in Madrid. On this album the song Decadencia is 11 minutes long and is fully improvised in the last concert of the "Avalancha Tour", in the last minutes the band says: "Nos vemos en la gira del próximo milenio", promising to do a tour in the new millennium like the one in September 2007.

After being originally issued on CD in September 1996, Parasiempre was released as a triple vinyl set on 12 May 2023.

== Track listing ==
Disc 1

1. "Deshacer el Mundo" - 5:24
2. "Iberia Sumergida" - 5:08
3. "Días de Borrasca (Víspera de Resplandores)" - 5:57
4. "Parasiempre" - 4:07
5. "El Camino del Exceso" - 5:50
6. "Sirena Varada" - 4:26
7. "Maldito Duende" - 5:18
8. "La Chispa Adecuada (Bendecida III)" - 5:20
9. "Oración" - 4:00
10. "Nuestros Nombres" - 7:10

Disc 2

1. "Hechizo" - 3:27
2. "Entre Dos Tierras" - 5:54
3. "Avalancha" - 6:42
4. "Flor de Loto" - 6:19
5. "Flor Venenosa" - 4:19
6. "La Herida" - 4:43
7. "Mar adentro" - 4:36
8. "Opio" - 5:51
9. "La Decadencia" (Medley) - 11:03

The edition for Mexico does not contain the songs "Parasiempre" in disc 1 and "Hechizo" in disc 2.

== Personnel ==
- Alan Boguslavsky - Rhythm guitar
- Enrique Bunbury - Vocalist
- Joaquin Cardiel - Bass
- Juan Valdivia - Lead guitar
- Pedro Andreu - Drums

== Charts ==
=== Weekly charts ===
2023 weekly chart performance for Parasiempre
Chart (2023)	Peak position
Spanish Albums (PROMUSICAE)	6

== Certifications ==
Region	Certification	Certified units/sales
Spain (PROMUSICAE)	Platinum	100,000^{^}
^{^} Shipments figures based on certification alone.
