= The Platinum Collection (Héroes del Silencio album) =

Compilation album by Héroes del Silencio
- Released: November 20, 2006
- Recorded: 1988–1996
- Genre: Rock en español
- Length: 3 hours and 15 minutes
- Label: EMI, Parlophone Music Spain

Héroes del Silencio chronology
El Ruido y la Furia (2005)	The Platinum Collection (2006)	Tour 2007 (2007)

The Platinum Collection is a compilation album by Héroes del Silencio that was released on November 20, 2006. The album included many of the band's greatest hits and also included a live performance of "El Mar No Cesa" from Senda '91, an unreleased live performance of "El Estanque", two live performances from the 1996 MTV Rock am Ring, and tracks from the unreleased album Acoustic.

The album was released with a DVD titled Platinum Collection: Los Videos

The album was rereleased for their 2007 World Tour and included a T-shirt with the purchase of the album called Edicion Especial Tour 2007.

== Track listing ==
Disc 1

1. "Entre dos tierras" - 6:08
2. "Mar Adentro" - 4:01
3. "Maldito duende" - 4:13
4. "Iberia sumergida" - 5:21
5. "La sirena varada" - 4:17
6. "Apuesta por el rock 'n' roll - 3:51 (cover of Mas Birras)
7. "Deshacer el mundo" - 4:47
8. "La herida" - 6:54
9. "Flor venenosa" - 4:08
10. "La chispa adecuada (Bendecida 3)" - 5:27
11. "Despertar" - 2:52
12. "Avalancha" - 5:58
13. "Opio" - 6:18
14. "Tesoro" - 2:19
15. Los placeres de la pobreza" - 4:59

Disc 2

1. "Nuestros nombres" - 5:57
2. "Héroe de leyenda" - 4:08
3. "Con nombre de guerra" - 4:16
4. "En brazos de la fiebre" - 4:45
5. "Fuente esperanza" - 4:30
6. "Flor de loto" - 6:19
7. "Oración" - 4:08
8. No más lágrimas" - 3:32
9. "La carta" - 3:07
10. "Malas intenciones" - 3:49
11. "El camino del exceso" - 5:36
12. "Agosto" - 4:20
13. "Hace tiempo" - 4:29
14. "Virus" - 4:36
15. "Senda" - 3:53

Disc 3

1. "Héroe de leyenda - Versión acústica" - 5:14
2. "Con nombre de guerra - Versión acústica" - 4:19
3. "Deshacer el mundo - En directo" - 5:04
4. "La sirena varada - Versión acústica" (MTV 1994) - 4:18
5. "La herida - Versión acústica" - 4:47
6. "El mar no cesa - Versión Platinum - En directo" - 3:21
7. "La carta - Versión acústica" - 3:22
8. "El estanque - Versión acústica" - 4:24
9. "La sirena varada - Versión acústica" (1996) - 4:21
10. "Iberia sumergida" - Versión acústica" - 5:12
11. "Iberia sumergida - En directo Rock'am'Ring" - 5:30
12. "El camino del exceso - En directo Rock'am'Ring" - 5:55

== Charts ==
Chart (2006)	Peak position
Spanish Albums (PROMUSICAE)	8
