= Flamingos (album) =

Studio album by Enrique Bunbury
- Released: May 21, 2002
- Recorded: 2001–2002
- Genre: Rock en español
- Label: Hispavox
- Producer: Enrique Bunbury

Enrique Bunbury chronology
Pequeño (1999)	Flamingos (2002)	El Viaje A Ninguna parte (2004)

Professional ratings
Review scores
Source	Rating
Allmusic	4.5/5 stars

Flamingos is Enrique Bunbury's third studio album.

== Track listing ==
All tracks are written by Enrique Bunbury, except where noted.

No.	Title	Writer(s)	Length
1.	"El club de los imposibles"		4:46
2.	"Sí"	Adrià Puntí	3:20
3.	"Contar contigo"		4:52
4.	"Sácame de aquí""		4:30
5.	"Enganchado a ti""		3:56
6.	"Lady Blue"		5:30
7.	"San Cosme y San Damián"		3:52
8.	"Un bastón Para Tu Corazón"		2:12
9.	"No Se Fíe"		3:39
10.	"Ciudad de Bajas Pasiones"		3:53
11.	"Hermosos y Malditos"		4:12
12.	"One, Two, Three"		4:50
13.	"Hoy No Estoy Para Nadie"		7:28
14.	"Mundo Feliz"		4:42
15.	"...Y al final"		4:18
