= En Directo (EP) =

EP by Héroes Del Silencio
- Released: 1989
- Genre: Rock en español
- Label: EMI

Héroes Del Silencio chronology
El mar no cesa (1988)	En Directo (1989)	Senderos de Traición (1990)

En Directo is a live EP by the spanish rock band Héroes Del Silencio, released in 1989, after the "El Mar No Cesa" tour. This is their first live album and these songs would also be included in other albums like the Special Edition of El Mar No Cesa, Rarezas, and Canciones '84-'96.

== Track listing ==
1. "Mar adentro"
2. "No más lágrimas"
3. "La visión de vuestras almas"
4. "El estanque"
5. "Olvidado"
