= List of number-one hits of 1962 (Mexico) =

This is a list of the songs that reached number one in Mexico in 1962, according to Billboard magazine with data provided by Audiomusica.

== Chart history ==
Issue date	Song	Artist(s)	Ref.
January 6	"Popotitos"	Los Teen Tops	
January 13	"Popotitos"	Los Teen Tops	
January 20	"Popotitos"	Los Teen Tops	
January 27	"Popotitos"	Los Teen Tops	
February 3	"Popotitos"	Los Teen Tops	
February 10	"El loco"	Javier Solís	
February 17	"El loco"	Javier Solís	
February 24	"El loco"	Javier Solís	
March 3	"El loco"	Javier Solís	
March 10	"El loco"	Javier Solís	
March 17	"El loco"	Javier Solís	
March 24	"El loco"	Javier Solís	
March 31	"El loco"	Javier Solís	
April 7	"El loco"	Javier Solís	
April 14	"El loco"	Javier Solís	
April 21	"El loco"	Javier Solís	
April 28	"El loco"	Javier Solís	
May 5	"El loco"	Javier Solís	
May 12	"El loco"	Javier Solís	
May 19	"El loco"	Javier Solís	
May 26	"El loco"	Javier Solís	
June 2	"El loco"	Javier Solís	
June 9	"El loco"	Javier Solís	
June 16	"Susie la coqueta" / "El gran Tomás"	Mayté Gaos	
June 23	"El gran Tomás"	Mayté Gaos	
June 30	"El gran Tomás"	Mayté Gaos	
July 7	"El gran Tomás"	Mayté Gaos	
July 14	"El gran Tomás"	Mayté Gaos	
July 21	"Triángulo"	Los Tres Reyes	
July 28	"Triángulo"	Los Tres Reyes	
August 4	"El gran Tomás"	Mayté Gaos	
August 11	"El gran Tomás"	Mayté Gaos	
August 18	"El gran Tomás"	Mayté Gaos	
August 25	"Triángulo"	Los Tres Reyes	
September 1	"Ven, que te quiero"	Los Impala	
September 8	"Ven, que te quiero"	Los Impala	
September 15	"Ven, que te quiero"	Los Impala	
September 22	"Ven, que te quiero"	Los Impala	
September 29	"Ven, que te quiero"	Los Impala	
October 6	"El nido"	Sonora Santanera	
October 13	"El nido"	Sonora Santanera	
October 20	"Que se mueran de envidia"	Javier Solís	
October 27	"El nido"	Sonora Santanera	
November 3	"El nido"	Sonora Santanera	
November 10	"Que se mueran de envidia"	Javier Solís	
November 17	"Que se mueran de envidia"	Javier Solís	
November 24	"Muchacha bonita"	Miguel Aceves Mejía & Marco Antonio Muñiz / José Alfredo Jiménez	
December 1	"Muchacha bonita"	Miguel Aceves Mejía & Marco Antonio Muñiz / José Alfredo Jiménez	
December 8	"Muchacha bonita"	Miguel Aceves Mejía & Marco Antonio Muñiz / José Alfredo Jiménez	
December 15	"El nido"	Sonora Santanera	
December 22	"Muchacha bonita"	Miguel Aceves Mejía & Marco Antonio Muñiz / José Alfredo Jiménez	
December 29	"El ladrón"	Sonora Santanera	

=== By country of origin ===
Number-one artists:

Country of origin	Number of artists	Artists
Mexico	7	Los Teen Tops
Mexico	7	Javier Solís
Mexico	7	Los Tres Reyes
Mexico	7	Los Impala
Mexico	7	Sonora Santanera
Mexico	7	Miguel Aceves Mejía & Marco Antonio Muñiz
Mexico	7	José Alfredo Jiménez
Spain	1	Mayté Gaos

Number-one compositions (it denotes the country of origin of the song's composer[s]; in case the song is a cover of another one, the name of the original composition is provided in parentheses):

Country of origin	Number of compositions	Compositions
Mexico	5	"El loco"
Mexico	5	"Ven, que te quiero"
Mexico	5	"El nido"
Mexico	5	"Muchacha bonita"
Mexico	5	"El ladrón"
United States	3	"Popotitos" ("Bony Moronie")
United States	3	"Susie la coqueta" ("Runaround Sue")
United States	3	"El gran Tomás" ("Norman")
Puerto Rico	1	"Triángulo"

== See also ==
- 1962 in music

== Sources ==
- Print editions of the Billboard magazine from January 6 to December 29, 1962.
