= Live in Germany (Héroes del Silencio album) =

Live album by Héroes del Silencio
- Released: November 22, 2011
- Label: EMI

Héroes del Silencio chronology
Tour 2007 (2007)	Live in Germany (2011)	Héroes: Silence and Rock & Roll (2021)

Live in Germany is a live album by Héroes del Silencio released on November 22, 2011. The album was recorded on October 2, 1993, in Koblenz, Germany during the "El camino del exceso" tour.

This would be their first release after their actual last performance in the 2007 World Tour.

The album was released on vinyl and CD. A special edition of the album included a DVD that has a video of the performance.

== Track listing ==
1. "Nuestros Nombres"
2. "Maldito Duende"
3. "La Sirena Varada"
4. "El Camino del Exceso"
5. "Hechizo"
6. "Olvidado"
7. "Flor de Loto"
8. "Oración"
9. "La Herida"
10. "Entre Dos Tierras"
11. "Decadencia"
12. "Los Placeres de la Pobreza"
13. "Con Nombre de Guerra"
14. "Hace Tiempo"

Note: DVD does not include tracks 13 and 14.

== Charts ==
Chart (2011)	Peak position
Spanish Albums (PROMUSICAE)	5
