= Hellville de Luxe =

Studio album by Enrique Bunbury
- Released: October 7, 2008
- Genre: Latin rock
- Label: EMI Music

Enrique Bunbury chronology
| El Viaje a Ninguna Parte (2004) | Hellville de Luxe (2008) | Las Consecuencias (2010) |

Professional ratings
Review scores
| Source | Rating |
|---|---|
| AllMusic | 3.5/5 stars |

Hellville de Luxe is the fifth studio album recorded by Spanish singer-songwriter Enrique Bunbury released on October 7, 2008, in three formats; Vinyl, CD and Digital audio. The album was produced by Phil Manzanera, remixed in the Music Lan studios in Avinyonet de Puigventós and mastered in Sterling Sound in New York City.

== Track listing ==
All songs written by Enrique Bunbury. This information adapted from Allmusic.

| No. | Title | Length |
|---|---|---|
| 1. | "El Hombre Delgado Que No Flaqueará Jamás" | 6:52 |
| 2. | "Porque las Cosas Cambian" | 4:17 |
| 3. | "Bujías Para el Dolor" | 5:37 |
| 4. | "Si No Fuera por Tí" | 4:52 |
| 5. | "Hay Muy Poca Gente" | 4:45 |
| 6. | "El Porqué de Tus Silencios" | 5:00 |
| 7. | "Doscientos Huesos y un Collar de Calaveras" | 4:22 |
| 8. | "Irremediablemente Cotidiano" | 4:52 |
| 9. | "Canción Cruel" | 4:09 |
| 10. | "Todos lo Haremos Mejor en el Futuro" | 4:40 |
| 11. | "Aquí" | 5:20 |

Digital edition bonus tracks
| No. | Title | Length |
|---|---|---|
| 12. | "La Herida Secreta" | 4:36 |

Vinyl edition bonus tracks
| No. | Title | Length |
|---|---|---|
| 12. | "La Herida Secreta" | 4:36 |
| 13. | "Bobby Perú" | 4:58 |
| 14. | "Esto Se Hace, Esto No Se Hace" | 4:57 |
| 15. | "Ven y Camina Conmigo" | 4:24 |

== Certifications ==
| Region | Certification | Certified units/sales |
|---|---|---|
| Mexico (AMPROFON) | Gold | 40,000^{^} |
| Spain (PROMUSICAE) | Gold | 40,000^{^} |
^{^} Shipments figures based on certification alone.
