= El Mar No Cesa =

Studio album by Héroes del Silencio
- Released: 31 October 1988
- Recorded: 1988
- Genre: Pop rock, post-punk, gothic rock,
- Language: Spanish
- Label: EMI
- Producer: Gustavo Montesano, Roberto Azorin

Héroes del Silencio chronology
Héroe de Leyenda (1988)	El Mar No Cesa (1988)	En Directo (1989)

El Mar No Cesa (Spanish: The Sea Won't Stop) is the debut album of Spanish rock band Héroes del Silencio, released on October 31 1988. It went platinum quickly, and made them one of the greatest rock bands of Spain.

== Track listing ==
=== LP edition ===
1. "Mar Adentro" (Into the Sea) - 4:00
2. "Hace Tiempo" (It's Been a While) - 4:31
3. "Fuente Esperanza" (Hope Fountain) - 4:46
4. "No Más Lágrimas" (No More Tears) - 3:30
5. "La Lluvia Gris" (The Grey Rain) - 4:20
6. "Flor Venenosa" (Poisonous Flower) - 4:10
7. "Agosto" (August) - 4:22
8. "El Estanque" (The Pond) - 4:14
9. "La Isla de Las Iguanas" (Island of the Iguanas) - 3:18
10. "... 16" - 3:52
11. "Héroe de Leyenda" (Hero of Legend) - 4:07

=== CD edition ===
1. "Mar Adentro" - 4:00
2. "Hace Tiempo" - 4:31
3. "Fuente Esperanza" - 4:46
4. "No Más Lagrimas" - 3:30
5. "Olvidado" (Forgotten) - 4:26
6. "La Lluvia Gris" - 4:20
7. "Flor Venenosa" - 4:10
8. "Agosto" - 4:22
9. "El Estanque" - 4:14
10. "La Visión de Vuestras Almas" (Vision of Thy Souls) - 4:10
11. "La Isla de Las Iguanas" - 3:18
12. "... 16" - 3:52
13. "Héroe de Leyenda" - 4:07
