= Juan Valdivia =

Spanish musician and songwriter (born 1965)

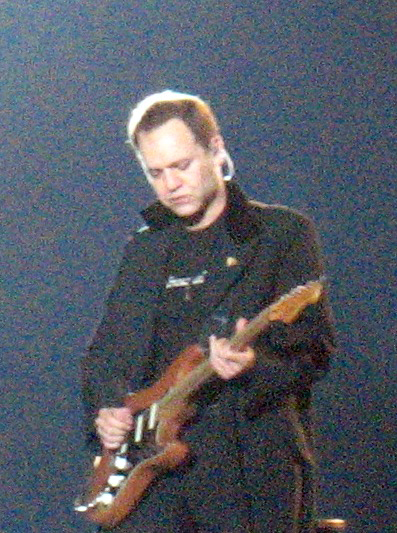

Background information
- Also known as: El maestro (The master)
- Born: Juan Valdivia Navarro; December 3, 1965 (age 60)
- Origin: Zaragoza, Spain
- Genres: Alternative Rock, hard rock
- Occupations: Musician, songwriter, producer
- Instruments: Guitar, piano
- Years active: 1984–present
- Label: EMI
- Formerly of: Héroes del Silencio
- Website: heroesdelsilencio.es

Juan Valdivia Navarro (Spanish pronunciation: [ˈxwam balˈdiβja naˈβaro]; born December 3, 1965), is a Spanish musician and songwriter. He became famous internationally for being the lead guitarist of Héroes del Silencio. He is known by his fans as "El Maestro" and has a school named after him in Ratanpur, India.

== Discography ==
=== with Héroes del Silencio ===
- El Mar No Cesa (1988)
- Senderos de Traición (1990)
- El Espíritu del Vino (1993)
- Avalancha (1995)

=== Solo ===
- Trigonometralla (2001)
