= El Ruido y la Furia =

Live album by Héroes del Silencio
- Released: June 2005
- Recorded: 20–21 November 1995
- Venue: Sala La Riviera, Madrid, Spain
- Genre: Rock en español, hard rock
- Label: EMI Latin

Héroes del Silencio chronology
Antología Audiovisual (2004)	El Ruido y la Furia (2005)	The Platinum Collection (2006)

El Ruido y la Furia (Spanish for The Sound and the Fury, after William Faulkner's homonymous novel) is a live album by the Latin rock group Héroes del Silencio, recorded on 20–21 November 1995 at the Sala La Riviera in Madrid. Released in 2005, it peaked at the top of the Spanish album charts.

A DVD is included with the album.

== Track listing ==
1. "Iberia Sumergida" - 5:16
2. "¡Rueda, Fortuna!" - 3:58
3. "Sirena Varada" - 4:41
4. "Parasiempre" - 3:59
5. "Maldito Duende" - 5:44
6. "Oración" - 4:23
7. "Nuestros Nombres" - 8:00
8. "Entre Dos Tierras" - 5:58
9. "Avalancha" - 6:24
10. "Mar Adentro" - 4:04
11. "Decadencia" - 2:16

== Charts ==
Chart (2005)	Peak position
Spanish Albums (PROMUSICAE)	1
