= Senda '91 =

Live album by Héroes Del Silencio
- Released: 1991
- Recorded: 26 September 1991
- Venue: Las Rozas de Madrid, Spain
- Genre: Rock en Español
- Length: 37 minutes
- Label: EMI
- Producer: Keith Bessey, Heroes del Silencio

Héroes Del Silencio chronology
Senderos de Traición (1990)	Senda '91 (1991)	El Espíritu del Vino (1993)

Senda '91 is a live album by the Spanish rock band Héroes del Silencio. It was released after the "Tour Senda" tour, which highlighted music from their new album Senderos de Traición, songs from El Mar no Cesa, as well as new songs that wouldn't be released until their 1998 album Rarezas. The tour would last until October 1992 and would take a hiatus. The songs were recorded at a concert in Madrid, Spain.

== Track listing ==
1. "Hace tiempo" - 4:47
2. "Maldito duende" - 5:05
3. "Decadencia" - 8:02
4. "Con nombre de guerra" - 4:20
5. "Oración" - 4:10
6. "El mar no cesa" - 3:10
7. "El cuadro III" - 2:53
8. "Hologramas" - 2:29
