= Héroes del Silencio =

Spanish rock band

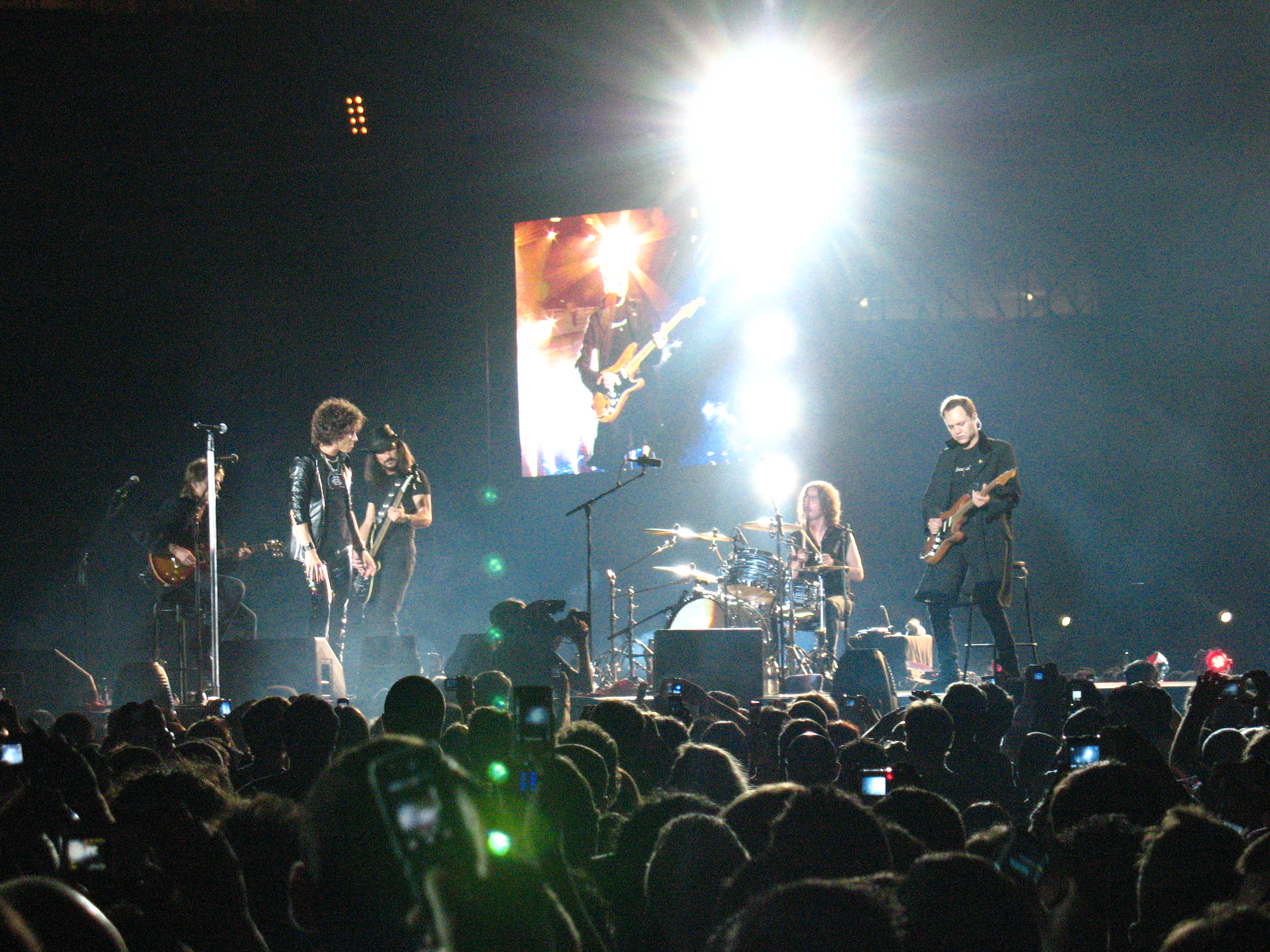
- Héroes del Silencio during the World Tour 2007 in Sevilla, Spain

Background information
- Also known as: Héroes, HDS
- Origin: Zaragoza, Spain
- Genres: Rock, hard rock, gothic rock, post-punk
- Years active: 1984–1996, 2007
- Label: EMI
- Past members: Enrique Bunbury; Juan Valdivia; Joaquin Cardiel; Pedro Andreu; Alan Boguslavsky

Héroes del Silencio (Spanish: Heroes of Silence) (well known as Héroes or HDS) was a Spanish rock band from Zaragoza, formed by guitarist Juan Valdivia and singer Enrique Bunbury. The lineup was completed by bassist Joaquín Cardiel and drummer Pedro Andreu. During the 1980s they experienced success around Spain and the Americas, and in various European countries including Germany, Belgium, Switzerland, France, Yugoslavia, and Portugal. They established themselves as one of the major contributors to the Rock en español scene and are considered to be one of the all-time best bands in that genre. Their trademarks are their intricate lyrics, complicated arrangements and precise rhythm. After twelve years and multiple albums, the band broke up in 1996. When the lead singer Enrique Bunbury started a solo project, other members of the band also followed a different musical path. In 2007, as part of a 20-year anniversary celebration and 11 years after their break-up, they organized a 10-concert world tour.

The band's distinctiveness was a characteristic image with a particular iconography and symbology, and a music characterized by ambiguous and transcendental lyrics, complicated arpeggios and a solid rhythmic base. Among its influences are William Blake, Charles Baudelaire, Led Zeppelin, and The Cult. AllMusic described them as "the very definition of rock en español."

In 2021 Netflix premiered the documentary "Heroes: Silencio and Rock & Roll" which covers the entire history of the band as told by the members.

== History ==
=== Overview ===
Héroes del Silencio was formed in 1984 under the name Zumo de Vidrio (Spanish: Glass Juice) by Juan Valdivia, his brother Pedro Valdivia and their cousin Javier Guajardo Valdivia. Enrique Bunbury joined the line-up as a bassist, but became the band's full-time vocalist after Juan Valdivia heard him sing a David Bowie song.

The band changed their name in 1985 to Héroes del Silencio. At first they played in public places and made demo recordings but their breakthrough came when they placed second in a music contest in Salamanca. An EMI producer, Gustavo Montesano, saw the band in the contest and signed the band at a later concert in Sala En Bruto.

Their first EP, Héroe de Leyenda, was released in 1987 and sold 30,000 copies. The following year, the album El Mar No Cesa was released, featuring the songs "Mar Adentro", "Agosto" and "El Estanque", and sold 100,000 copies. The supporting tour followed in 1989, documented on the limited edition live album En Directo.

On 10 December 1990, they released Senderos de Traición, their best-selling album with 2 million copies sold, including 400,000 copies in the first two weeks in Spain alone. The following year they started the Senda 91 tour and released another live album, Senda '91. In 1993 the band released El Espíritu del Vino. 600,000 copies of this album, which was played throughout the Americas, were sold. They followed this with a tour for El Espíritu del Vino. In 1993, Alan Boguslavsky joined the band.

Due to tensions within the band, Héroes del Silencio took a hiatus and went to Benasque to take a vacation and heal the rifts within the group. After this break they acquired a new producer, Bob Ezrin (Lou Reed, Pink Floyd, Peter Gabriel, Alice Cooper, Kiss, etc.) and in 1995 released Avalancha. Avalancha had a sound closer to hard rock than the previous albums, with songs like "Avalancha", "Deshacer el Mundo" and "Iberia Sumergida". The album was followed by the Avalancha tour in 1995 and 1996, which produced the live album "Para siempre".

The band split in 1996, but two more albums were released after this: the compilation Rarezas in 1998 and the live album El Ruido y la Furia in 2005.

=== Albums and tours ===
In 1988 Héroes recorded their first full-length album. El Mar No Cesa was a limited edition and all copies (30,000) were sold. The album was more pop-oriented than the band had originally wished, which made them perform live in a slightly more aggressive way so as to show the real potential of the band. A limited live album En Directo was later released capturing the energy of their concerts. In 1990 they went into the studio once again to work with producer Phil Manzanera on their second album, Senderos de Traición.

In 1990 Senderos de Traición was a successful second release for Héroes, "combining Celtic guitars [and] metal rhythms." The songs "Entre Dos Tierras" and "Maldito Duende" are still among the band's most popular. The album was recorded in London, including English versions of "Entre Dos Tierras" and "Maldito Duende". It was decided though to not publish them. The tour for this album was called Senda after the song of the same name. It took the band to the Americas and to various European countries including Germany and Belgium, winning several gold discs on the way. According to Bunbury, the tour represented the golden times of the band. The live album Senda '91 was produced on this tour. When the band played a concert in Mexico, they met Alan Boguslavsky, who would later join the band. Senderos de Traición stayed on the album charts of countries like Spain, Switzerland and Germany.

In 1993, after the success of Senderos de Traición, the band recorded their third album called El Espíritu del Vino which was produced by Phil Manzanera. The singles from the release were "Nuestros Nombres", "Flor de Loto", "Los Placeres De La Pobreza", "La Sirena Varada" and "La Herida" The album features hard rock and has a style similar to rock bands like Led Zeppelin, The Cult, The Mission, Fields of the Nephilim and Guns N' Roses. The songs "Nuestros Nombres" and "La Herida" reached the #1 position on several European charts. Alan Boguslavsky joined the band on the El Camino Del Exceso tour, during which they played in countries including Germany, Austria, Portugal, Italy, Mexico, Argentina, U.S.A., Chile, Finland and Hungary. The song "Nuestros Nombres" reached the top spot on the "40 Principales", being the first song of the band in the number one position. "La Sirena Varada" was the second song of Héroes del Silencio in "Los 40 Principales". The rest of the songs on the album got in the Top 10 of "Los 40 Principales" and on MTV.

"El Camino Del Exceso" meant in a number of ways the loss of compatibility between Bunbury and Valdivia.

In 1995 Héroes met Bob Ezrin, who produced the album Avalancha. This album was a new commercial success for the Héroes. Alan Boguslavsky, baptized "el Azteca de oro" (Spanish: The Golden Aztec), became an official member of the band, being credited as co-writer of several songs although he did not appear in the promotional photos for the album. The album has a stronger rock style than the previous ones. Songs like "Iberia Sumergida" and "La Chispa Adecuada" topped the charts. The title track, "Avalancha", topped charts like MTV. The tour was the band's most extensive. The final concert of Héroes del Silencio was meant to take place in Los Angeles but it was canceled because the crowd was angry at the band after rumors of their split. Héroes said goodbye in Spain with the mythical phrase: "Nos vemos en la gira del proximo milenio. Hasta Siempre [See you on tour in the next millennium. Farewell].".

== Breakup and reunion ==
At the Avalancha tour, the band participated in the Monsters of Rock of Brasil in 1996 as headliners. The concert was not recorded. The Héroes also got a special in MTV, like Unplugged and Gustock.

The "Tour macrogira Avalancha" from July 1995 to October 1996 led them to give 152 concerts in Europe and America. The coexistence during that time was difficult, and fatigue lead to increased internal conflicts. During this development, Bunbury started his own compositions and recorded new songs, hinting that his future was already far from Héroes del Silencio. Their last concert was in Los Angeles on 6 October 1996.

Before concluding the tour, and in a press conference in Lima, Peru, Héroes del Silencio reported their temporary separation. Apart from its environment, the news was surprising, but eventually came to transcend some of the reasons that had led to such a situation. The musical differences, especially between Juan and Enrique, became personal. The deaths of two persons very close to the group as well influenced the band's morale: their road manager Martin Druille in 1993, and Enrique's brother, Rafael, in 1994. As remarked by Bunbury, the last months of the tour were an ordeal for him.

=== 2007 reunion tour ===
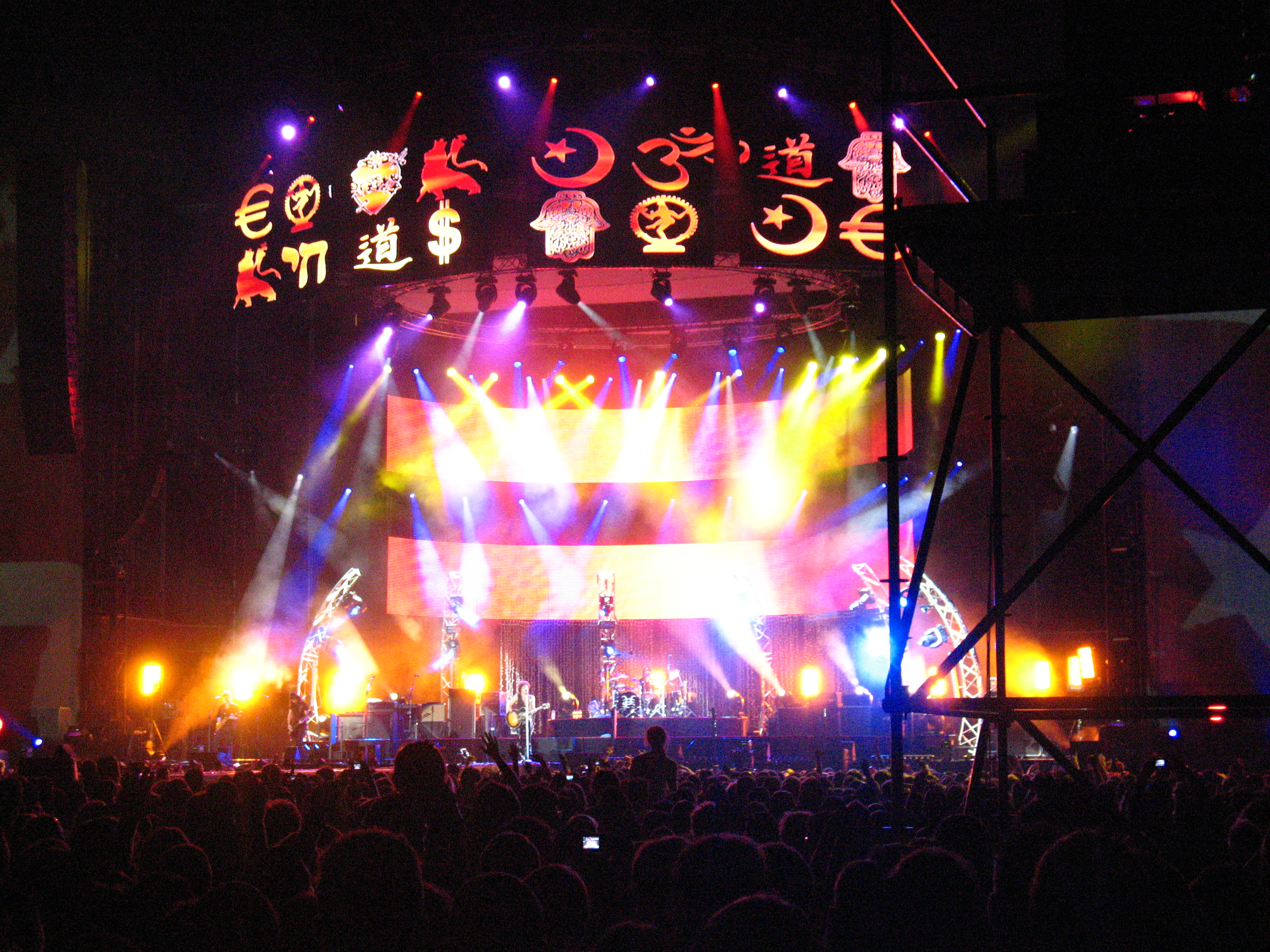
Héroes playing in Sevilla in October 2007

Twenty years after their first album, and eleven years after they split up, the band announced a ten-day reunion tour that would take them to Guatemala City, Buenos Aires, Monterrey, Ciudad de México, Los Angeles, Sevilla, Zaragoza and Valencia. For this tour guitarist Gonzalo Valdivia (Juan Valdivia's brother) replaced former band member Alan Boguslavsky. More than 20,000 people attended each concert and some of the concerts saw as many as 90,000 fans (e.g. in Valencia, Ricardo Tormo's Stadium). The tour was followed by another live album, Tour 2007. The album came with two DVD's that showed the concert at Ciudad de Mexico as well as showing some songs from other concerts like "Bendecida" in Los Angeles and "Flor Venenosa" in Monterrey. The other DVD contained a documentary of the group as they traveled through every city during the tour. The deluxe box set included both DVD and CD as well as a backstage pass, some drumsticks, a t-shirt, and two posters.

After the tour, singer-songwriter Enrique Bunbury announced his new album, focusing in his solo career.

== Band members ==
- Enrique Bunbury – lead vocals, acoustic guitar, harmonica (1984–1996; 2007) bass (1984)
- Juan Valdivia – guitars (1984–1996; 2007)
- Joaquin Cardiel – bass, backing vocals (1984–1996; 2007)
- Pedro Andreu – drums, percussion (1984–1996; 2007)
- Alan Boguslavsky – guitar, backing vocals (1993–1996)

=== Touring members ===
- Gonzalo Valdivia – guitar, backing vocals (2007)

== Discography ==
=== Studio albums ===
- El Mar No Cesa (1988)
- Senderos de traición (1990)
- El Espíritu del Vino (1993)
- Avalancha (1995)

A special edition of each album was released in 2006 by EMI. Each album includes an additional disc that includes remixes, live versions, and unreleased material

=== Live recordings ===
- En Directo (1989)
- Senda '91 (Las Rozas (Madrid), 26 September 1991)
- Parasiempre (Disc one: Zaragoza, 8 June 1996; Disc two: Madrid, 7 June 1996)
- El Ruido y la Furia La Riviera Madrid, Spain, 20 November 1996 (2005)
- Tour 2007 (2007)
- Live in Germany (2011)

=== Compilations ===
- Rarezas (outtakes and rare versions) (1998)
- Edición del Milenio (4-CD boxset) (1999)
- Canciones 1984–1996 (2-CD set) (2000)
- Antología Audiovisual (2004)
- The Platinum Collection (3 CD, 2 DVD) (2006)
- Héroes: Silence and Rock & Roll (2 CD) (2021)

=== Singles ===
- La Lluvia Gris (1988) From El Mar No Cesa
- Flor Venenosa (1988) From El Mar No Cesa
- Mar Adentro (1989) From El Mar No Cesa
- No Mas Lagrimas (1989) From El Mar No Cesa
- Fuente Esperanza (1989) From El Mar No Cesa
- Agosto (1989) From El Mar No Cesa
- Entre Dos Tierras (1990) From Senderos de traición
- Maldito Duende (1990) From Senderos de traición
- Oración (1991) From Senderos de tración
- Despertar (1991) From Senderos de traición
- Con Nombre De Guerra (1991) From Senderos de traición
- La Sirena Varada (1993) From El Espíritu del Vino
- La Herida (1993) From El Espíritu del Vino
- Nuestros Nombres (1993) From El Espíritu del Vino
- Sangre Hirviendo (1993) From El Espíritu del Vino
- Flor De Loto (1993) From El Espíritu del Vino
- Iberia Sumergida (1995) From Avalancha
- Deshacer El Mundo (1995) From Avalancha
- La Chispa Adecuada (1995) From Avalancha
- Apuesta Por El Rock'n'Roll (1998) From Rarezas(Cover of Más Birras)
- Morir Todavia (1998) From Rarezas and Avalancha

=== Extended plays ===
- Héroe de Leyenda (EP) (1987)

=== Unreleased albums ===
Many of the unreleased albums were live performances

- MTV Unplugged (1993)
- La Primera Avalancha (1996)
- Rock am Ring MTV (1996)
- Acoustic (1996)
- Tour 2007 – Estadio De la Romareda (2007)

=== In other media ===
- The song "Avalancha" is a bonus song in the video game Guitar Hero III: Legends of Rock.
- The song "Hechizo" is featured in the 2017 Netflix horror film, Verónica, and has since gained the band recognition and new fans as a result.

== Films ==
Music Videos

Mar Adentro – Music Video (1988)

Entre dos Tierras – Music Video (1991)

Maldito Duende – Music Video (1991)

Con nombre de guerra – Music Video (1991)

Nuestros nombres – Music Video (1993)

La Herida – Music Video (1993)

Los placeres de la pobreza – Music Video (1993)

La Sirena Varada – Music Video (1993)

Flor de Loto – Music Video (1993)

Iberia Sumergida – Music Video (1995)

Avalancha – Music Video (1995)

La chispa adecuada – Music Video (1995)

Maldito Duende (Live) – Music Video (1996)

Maldito Duende (Live 1996) is from Parasiempre album

- All the music videos are also included in the compilation album "Antologia Audiovisual"

Documental Gira 96'

- The documentary in "Antologia Audiovisual"

Tour 2007 (2007) (2 DVD)

- Mexico D.F concert including encores from other shows, 2nd DVD is documentary

Heroes del Silencio: Estadio de la Romareda (2007)

- Zaragoza Day 1 Show from 2007 World Tour – LIMITED EDITION

Tesoro: El ultimo silencio (2007)

- Recorded during the last concert in Valencia as part of the 2007 World Tour – LIMITED EDITION

Documental El Espiritu del Vino 20th anniversary (2013)

- Recorded in 1993 and released along 20th anniversary remixed album

Heroes: Silencio and Rock & Roll (2021)

- Netflix Documentary and Released along the 2 CD & 2 Vinyl Album

== See also ==
- Enrique Bunbury
- Joaquín Cardiel
- Juan Valdivia
- Spanish rock
- Rock en Español
