= Rarezas =

Compilation album by Heroes del Silencio
- Released: July 28, 1998
- Recorded: 1988–1995
- Genre: Rock en espanol
- Label: EMI

Heroes del Silencio chronology
Parasiempre (1996)	Rarezas (1998)	Canciones '84-'96 (2000)

Rarezas (Spanish: Rarities) is the first compilation album released by Héroes del Silencio on July 28, 1998. This was the band's first release since their disbandment in 1996. The album is a compilation of unreleased music, remixes, a cover, rare versions of released songs, and two live performances. The album was released on the label EMI and the songs were selected by drummer Pedro Andreu and bass player Joaquin Cardiel. These songs would be re-released for future compilation albums and the special edition of every studio album.

== Track listing ==
All tracks are written by Héroes del Silencio, except where noted.

No.	Title	Writer(s)	Length
1.	"Apuesta por el rock 'n' roll (Bet on rock and roll)"	Mauricio Aznar; Gabriel Sopeña	3:50
2.	"Virus"		4:35
3.	"Babel" (unreleased track)		4:24
4.	"...Y parasiempre (...and forever)" (Rare Version)		3:44
5.	"Medicina húmeda (Humid Medicine)"		3:01
6.	"El cuadro (The painting)" (Rare Version)		2:37
7.	"No más lágrimas" (No more tears)" (en directo)		3:36
8.	"La chispa adecuada (The right spark)" (Rare Version)		4:16
9.	"Acústica (Acoustic)"		3:00
10.	"Opio" (Ganges Vals Version)		6:07
11.	"Morir todavía (Still die)" (Rare Version)		4:06
12.	"Hologramas"		2:17
13.	""Nuestros nombres" (Our Names)" (Noel Harris Remix)		8:58
14.	"Héroe de leyenda" (en directo)		5:13

== Charts and certifications ==
- Peak chart positions: 3
- Certification: SPA:Gold
