= Enrique Bunbury =

Spanish singer and songwriter

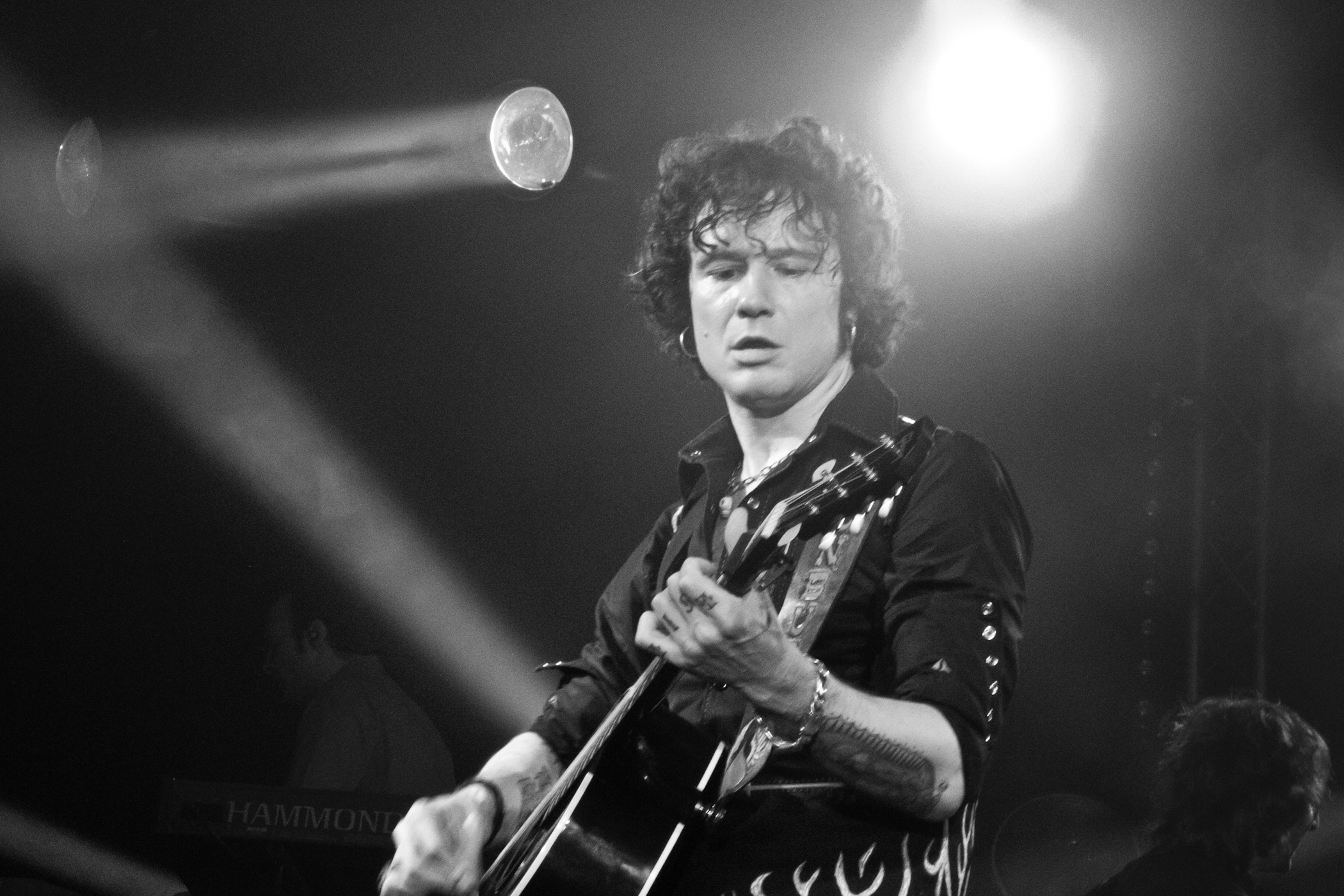
- Bunbury in 2012

Background information
- Born: 11 August 1967 (age 58)
- Origin: Zaragoza, Aragon, Spain
- Genres: Hard rock; Latin rock; indie pop
- Instruments: Vocals; guitar; harmonica; bass; drums
- Years active: 1984–present
- Website: Official website

Enrique Ortiz de Landázuri Izarduy (born 11 August 1967), best known as Enrique Bunbury, is a Spanish singer and songwriter. He has been described as "by far the most international star of Spanish rock" and by Billboard as "one of the greatest figures in the Spanish-speaking world." He was propelled to fame as lead singer of Héroes del Silencio. After the band disbanded in 1996, Bunbury gradually developed a solo career. His "tessitura" singing style would be in the baritone range. The Latin Recording Academy would describe Bunbury as "not only one of the most visionary rock stars ever to emerge from Spain, but also a 21st century master when it comes to crafting transcendent songs in the Spanish language."

== Career ==
Bunbury got involved in music in the early 1980s, making his debut in a high school band called Apocalipsis, and later played along with Proceso Entrópico. In 1984, Bunbury joined a group called Zumo de Vidrio, debuting as a lead vocalist. After adopting the nickname of Bunbury, taken from the Oscar Wilde stage play The Importance of Being Earnest, the musician founded the band Héroes del Silencio, becoming a major player in the Spanish rock scene. The band eventually broke up in 1996 and Bunbury embarked on his solo career in 1997 by launching an electro-rock album, Radical Sonora with his new band: Copi (piano), Del Moran (bass), Ramon Garcias (drums) and former Héroes del Silencio guitarist Alan Boguslavsky.

Known for reinventing himself, in 1999 Bunbury released the album Pequeño (Small), which sounded very different from anything he had ever done before. His band also underwent changes, Boguslavsky was replaced by Rafa Dominguez, and new faces came on board: Ana Belén Estaje (violin), Luis Miguel Romero (percussion), Javier Iñigo, Javier Garcia Vega & Antonio Ríos on the metal instruments.

This band was known as the "Huracán Ambulante" ("Wandering Hurricane"); they had great energy onstage and performed with tremendous gusto. In 2005 after 8 years together, Bunbury dissolved the band due to a series of events that caused him to feel frustrated with the record label and his future. Bunbury took a trip to disconnect and clear his thoughts by spending some time in Cuba. After some time he connected with Spanish singer songwriter Nacho Vegas. They agreed to record a new album titled "El Tiempo De Las Cerezas". The album was released in 2006 with a small tour. This led to the release of a live DVD performance at The Gran Teatre del Liceu in Barcelona.

In 2007, Héroes del Silencio agreed to take part in an exclusive worldwide tour consisting of ten concerts to be performed in ten cities worldwide, which bore the name "Tour 2007" and marked the 20th anniversary of their first performances and the ten years that had elapsed since their dissolution as a band in 1996. The first concert took place in Guatemala City on 15 September, followed by Buenos Aires (21 September), Monterrey, Mexico (25 September), Los Angeles (28 September), Mexico City (4 & 6 October), Zaragoza, Spain (10 & 12 October), Seville, Spain (20 October) and Valencia, Spain (27 October), which wrapped up the '07 Tour.

Bunbury went on to ensemble a new band which goes by the name "Los Santos Inocentes" (The Innocent Saints). Bunbury has recorded eight studio albums with Los Santos Inocentes. Helville De Luxe (2008), Las Consecuencias (2010), Licenciado Cantinas (2011), Palosanto (2013), MTV Unplugged: El Libro De Las Mutaciones (2015), Expectativas (2017), Posible (2020), and Curso De Levitación Intensivo (2020).

Unlike Héroes del Silencio, Bunbury's solo career has been very different in terms of musical sound but managed to keep the essence of rock, while experimenting with various rhythms from electronic music and Middle Eastern sounds in the early stages of his solo career to cabaret music, rancheras, blues, flamenco and tango, or to salsa, milonga, boleros and cumbia in one of his latest works which pays tribute to Latin America. According to La Banda Elastica, "Rock gods do exist... and Enrique Bunbury is definitely one of them." He is renowned for his powerful, operatic voice which can range from F2-A5 with the ability to hit C3. Bunbury is a baritone. The SESAC Latina Music Awards honoured him with the Icon Award in 2019. He will receive a Lifetime Achievement Award by The Latin Recording Academy in 2025 as a "pioneering, musically omnivorous and intensely poetic" musical legend.

A documentary directed by Alexis Morante was released in 2016 entitled El camino más largo (The Longest Way), which chronicles the 2010 tour Bunbury did of the United States.

He is a vegan.

== Discography ==
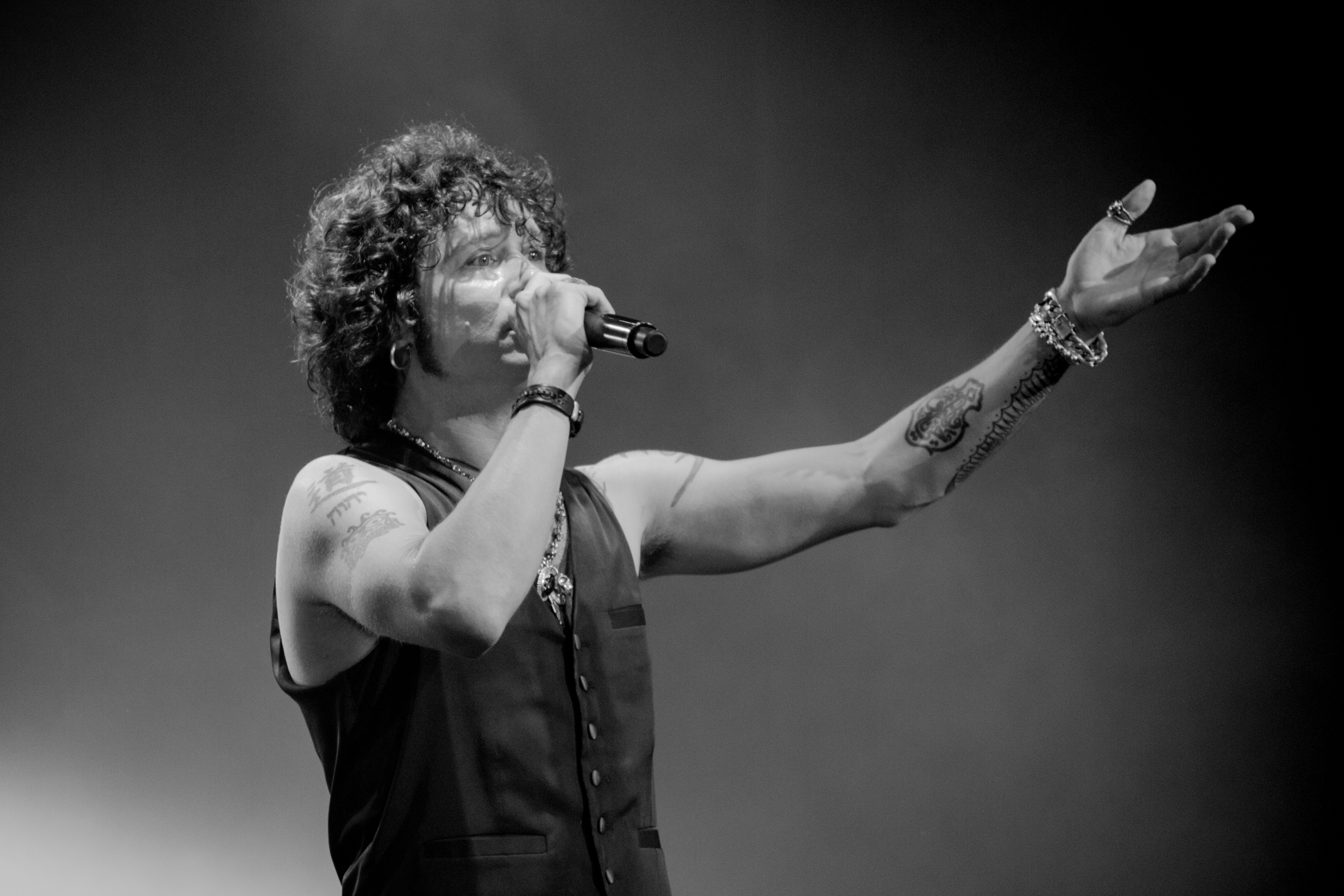
Enrique Bunbury performing in 2010

=== Studio albums ===
| Year | Album | Peak chart positions | |
| Year | Album | SPA | ARG |
|---|---|---|---|
| 1997 | Radical Sonora | 15 | — |
| 1999 | Pequeño | 10 | — |
| 2002 | Flamingos | 11 | — |
| 2004 | El Viaje a Ninguna Parte | 39 | — |
| 2008 | Hellville de Luxe | 1 | — |
| 2010 | Las Consecuencias | 1 | — |
| 2011 | Licenciado Cantinas | 2 | — |
| 2013 | Palosanto | 2 | — |
| 2017 | Expectativas | 1 | 3 |
| 2020 | Posible | 16 | — |
| 2020 | Curso de Levitación intensivo | 3 | — |
| 2023 | Greta Garbo | 1 | — |
| 2025 | Cuentas Pendientes | 1 | — |
"—" denotes releases that did not chart

=== Live albums ===
| Year | Album | Peak chart positions | |
| Year | Album | SPA | MX |
|---|---|---|---|
| 2000 | Pequeño Cabaret Ambulante | — | — |
| 2003 | Una Cita en Flamingos | — | — |
| 2005 | Freak Show | 3 | — |
| 2011 | Gran Rex | 1 | 3 |
| 2012 | De Cantina en Cantina. On Stage 2011–12 Live | — | — |
| 2013 | Cualquier Tiempo Pasado... Live 2011–2012 | — | — |
| 2015 | MTV Unplugged: El Libro De Las Mutaciones | — | 1 |
| 2019 | California Live!!! | — | 6 |
"—" denotes releases that did not chart

== Awards and nominations ==
=== Latin Grammy Awards ===
| Year | Category | Nominated work | Result | Ref. |
|---|---|---|---|---|
| 2000 | Best Male Rock Vocal Performance | "El Extranjero" | Nominated | |
| 2005 | Best Rock Solo Vocal Album | El Viaje a Ninguna Parte | Nominated | |
| 2009 | Best Rock Solo Vocal Album | Hellville de Luxe | Nominated | |
| 2009 | Best Rock Song | "Hay Muy Poca Gente" | Nominated | |
| 2012 | Best Long Form Music Video | Licenciado Cantinas, The Movie | Nominated | |
| 2014 | Best Rock Album | Palosanto | Nominated | |
| 2014 | Best Rock Song | "Despierta" | Nominated | |
| 2018 | Best Rock Song | "La Actitud Correcta" | Nominated | |
| 2018 | Best Rock Album | Expectativas | Won | |
| 2021 | Best Rock Album | Curso de Levitación Intensivo | Nominated | |
| 2022 | Best Rock Song | "Esperando una Señal" | Nominated | |

Note: Two other songs performed by Bunbury but not written by him have been nominated for the Latin Grammy Award for Best Rock Song, "Gozilla" with Leiva and Ximena Sariñana in 2019 and "El Sur" with Love of Lesbian in 2021, both nominations went to the songwriters of each song; Leiva for the former and Santi Balmes & Julián Saldarriaga for the latter.

=== MTV Europe Music Awards ===
| Year | Category | Nominated work | Result | Ref. |
|---|---|---|---|---|
| 2002 | Best Spanish Act | Himself | Nominated | |
| 2004 | Best Spanish Act | Himself | Won | |
| 2016 | Best Spanish Act | Himself | Won | |
