= ¿Con Quién Se Queda el Perro? =

Studio album by Jesse & Joy
- Released: December 6, 2011
- Recorded: 2010–2011
- Genres: Latin rock, Latin pop, pop rock
- Length: 51:24
- Label: Warner Music Mexico
- Producer: Martin Terefe

Jesse & Joy chronology
Electricidad (2009)	¿Con Quién Se Queda el Perro? (2011)	Soltando al Perro (2014)

Singles from ¿Con Quién Se Queda el Perro?
- 1. "Me Voy" Released: September 5, 2011; 2. "¡Corre!" Released: October 4, 2011; 3. "La de la Mala Suerte" Released: March 13, 2012; 4. "¿Con Quién Se Queda el Perro?" Released: July 9, 2012; 5. "Llorar" Released: October 10, 2012; 6. "Me Quiero Enamorar" Released: August 19, 2013

Professional ratings
Review scores
Source	Rating
Allmusic	3.5/5 stars

¿Con Quién Se Queda el Perro? (English: Who does the dog stay with?) is the third studio album by Mexican pop rock duo Jesse & Joy, released on December 6, 2011 through Warner Music Mexico.

The album and its songs won four Latin Grammy Awards at the Latin Grammy Awards of 2012, including Record of the Year and Song of the Year for "¡Corre!", and Best Contemporary Pop Vocal Album. The album was nominated for the Best Latin Pop Album category at the 55th Annual Grammy Awards. "Llorar" was nominated for the Latin Grammy Award for Song of the Year at the Latin Grammy Awards of 2013. The album was further nominated for Pop Album of the Year at the Premio Lo Nuestro 2013. "¡Corre!" was featured in the novela La que no podía amar. "Llorar" was also featured in the telenovela Corona de lágrimas.

== Track listing ==
Following, the track list of ¿Con Quién Se Queda El Perro?. All songs were written by Jesse & Joy, with additional writing noted. All songs produced by Martin Terefe.

No.	Title	Writer(s)	Length
1.	"Aquí Voy"	Tommy Torres	3:07
2.	"¿Con Quién Se Queda el Perro?"	Torres	3:08
3.	"Como No"	Martin Terefe	3:36
4.	"¡Corre!"	Torres	4:49
5.	"Gotitas de Amor"		3:13
6.	"La de la Mala Suerte"		4:11
7.	"Quiero Que Me Quieras"		3:02
8.	"Me Llora el Cielo"		3:47
9.	"Tú Mi Poesía"		4:00
10.	"Veneno"		3:51
11.	"Me Voy"		3:30
12.	"Me Quiero Enamorar"		4:00

The deluxe edition was released December 4, 2012. It includes a DVD with five music videos and two documentary films. All songs written by Jesse and Joy Huerta, except for "Imagine"; additional writing is noted. All songs produced by Jesse, additional producing is noted.

Deluxe edition
No.	Title	Writer(s)	Producer	Length
10.	"Veneno [B-side]"		Milo Froideval	5:11
13.	"Perfecta"		Terefe	3:12
14.	"Una en un Millón"		Terefe	3:40
15.	"Llorar" (featuring Mario Domm)	Hanna Huerta, Domm		3:47
16.	"¡Corre! (The Warner Sound)"			4:46
17.	"La de la Mala Suerte (The Warner Sound)"			4:09
18.	"¿Con Quién Se Queda el Perro? (The Warner Sound)"			3:10
19.	"Nuevos Recuerdos"			3:08
20.	"Imagine"	John Lennon		3:11

DVD
No.	Title	Director	Length
1.	"Me Voy / Movie version"	Carlos López Estrada	3:36
2.	"¡Corre! / Extended version"	Pedro Torres, Fausto Terán (sequel)	6:32
3.	"La de la Mala Suerte"	Gustavo Garzón	4:16
4.	"¿Con Quién Se Queda el Perro?"	Garzón	3:48
5.	"Llorar"	P. Torres	5:00
6.	"Dos Hermanos, Un Camino"	Paco Ibarra, J. Huerta	26:24
7.	"CQSQEP Tour 2012 Día 1"	Ibarra	6:59

== Charts ==
=== Weekly charts ===
Chart (2011–2012)	Peak position
Mexican Albums (Top 100 Mexico)	3
Spain (PROMUSICAE)	19
US Latin Pop Albums (Billboard)	2
US Top Latin Albums (Billboard)	8

=== Year-end charts ===
Chart (2012)	Position
US Top Latin Albums (Billboard)	29
Chart (2013)	Position
US Top Latin Albums (Billboard)	40

=== Sales and certifications ===
Region	Certification	Certified units/sales
Argentina (CAPIF)	2× Platinum	80,000^{^}
Chile	—	5,000
Mexico (AMPROFON)	3× Platinum	180,000^{^}
United States (RIAA)	4× Platinum (Latin)	240,000^{‡}
^{^} Shipments figures based on certification alone.^{‡} Sales+streaming figures based on certification alone.

== Awards and nominations ==
Year	Ceremony	Award	Nominated	Result
2012	Premios Juventud	Best Ballad	"¡Corre!"	Nominated
2012	Premios Juventud	My Favorite Video	"¡Corre!"	Nominated
2012	Latin Grammy Awards	Record of the Year	"¡Corre!"	Won
2012	Latin Grammy Awards	Song of the Year	"¡Corre!"	Won
2012	Latin Grammy Awards	Best Short Form Music Video	"Me Voy"	Won
2012	Latin Grammy Awards	Album of the Year	¿Con Quién Se Queda El Perro?	Nominated
2012	Latin Grammy Awards	Best Contemporary Pop Album	¿Con Quién Se Queda El Perro?	Won
2013	Grammy Awards	Best Latin Pop Album	¿Con Quién Se Queda El Perro?	Nominated
2013	Latin Billboard Music Awards	Latin Pop Airplay Song of the Year	"¡Corre!"	Nominated
2013	Premios Juventud	Best Theme Novelero	"Llorar"	Nominated
2013	Premios Juventud	The Perfect Combination	"Llorar"	Won
2013	Premios Juventud	Best Ballad	"Llorar"	Won
2013	Latin Grammy Awards	Song of the Year	"Llorar"	Nominated
