= List of top 20 songs for 2012 in Mexico =

This is a list of the General Top 20 songs of 2012 in Mexico according to Monitor Latino. Monitor Latino also issued separate year-end charts for Regional Mexican, Pop and Anglo songs.

№	Title	Artist(s)
1	"Creo en ti"	Reik
2	"La de la mala suerte"	Jesse & Joy
3	"Gente batallosa"	Calibre 50 ft. Banda Carnaval
4	"¿De qué me sirve la vida?"	Camila
5	"Llamada de mi ex"	La Arrolladora Banda El Limón
6	"Cabecita dura"	La Arrolladora Banda El Limón
7	"La mejor de todas"	Banda El Recodo
8	"¡Corre!"	Jesse & Joy
9	"Addicted to You"	Shakira
10	"Aire soy"	Miguel Bosé & Ximena Sariñana
11	"Lo que son las cosas"	Yuridia
12	"We Found Love"	Rihanna
13	"Ai Se Eu Te Pego"	Michel Teló
14	"Inténtalo"	3Ball MTY ft. El Bebeto & América Sierra
15	"Aguaje activado"	Calibre 50
16	"Te fuiste de aquí"	Reik
17	"Rival"	Romeo Santos ft. Mario Domm
18	"10 segundos"	La Adictiva Banda San José de Mesillas
19	"El mejor perfume"	La Original Banda El Limón
20	"Mujer de todos, mujer de nadie"	Calibre 50

== See also ==
- List of number-one songs of 2012 (Mexico)
- List of number-one albums of 2012 (Mexico)
