= List of number-one songs of 2012 (Mexico) =

This is a list of the Monitor Latino number-one songs of 2012. Chart rankings are based on airplay across radio states in Mexico utilizing the Radio Tracking Data, LLC in real time. Charts are ranked from Monday to Sunday. Besides the General chart, Monitor Latino published "Pop", "Regional Mexican" and "Anglo" charts.

== Chart history ==
=== General ===
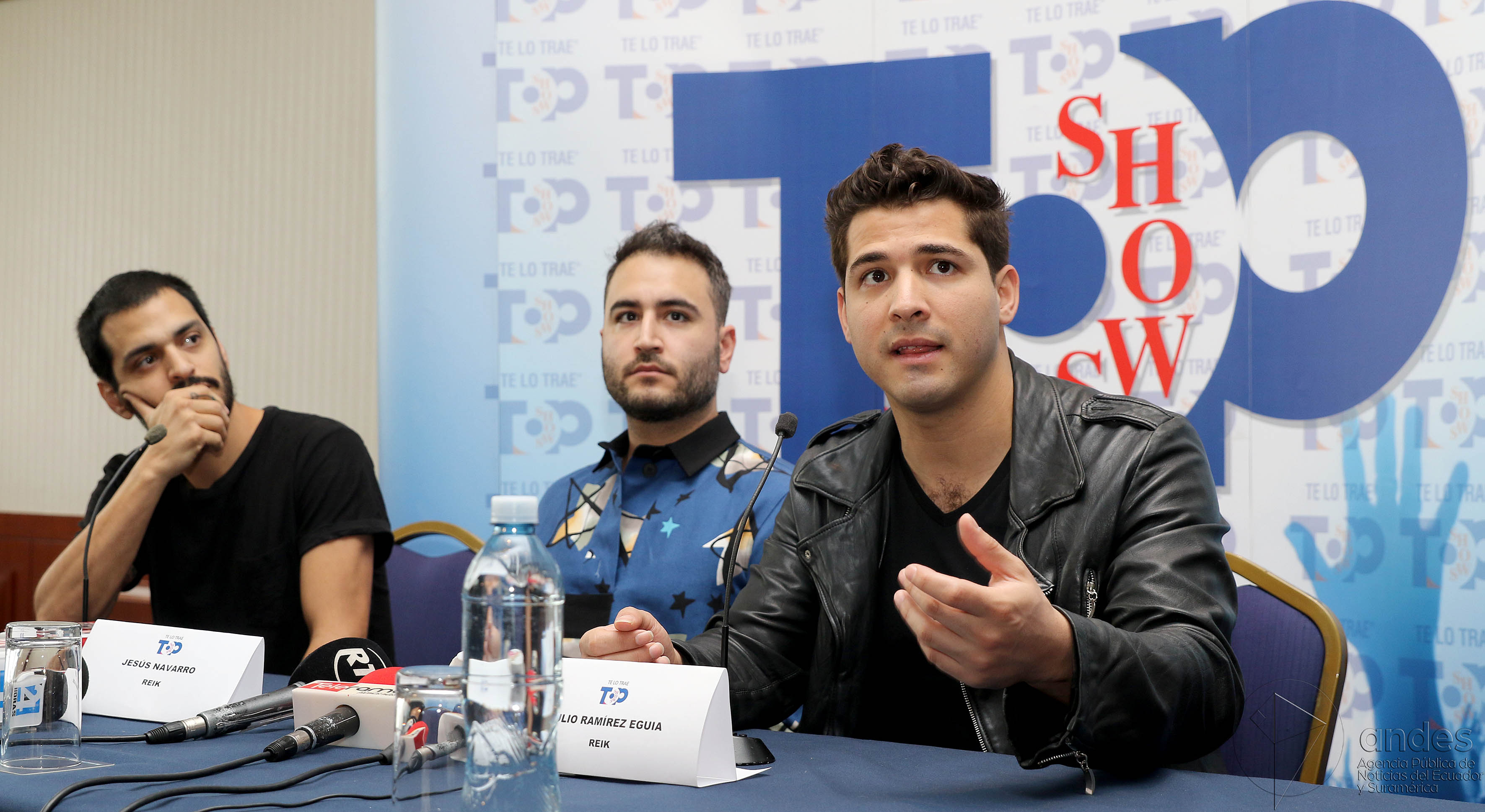
"Creo en ti" by Mexican band Reik (pictured) was the most successful song of the year in Mexico.

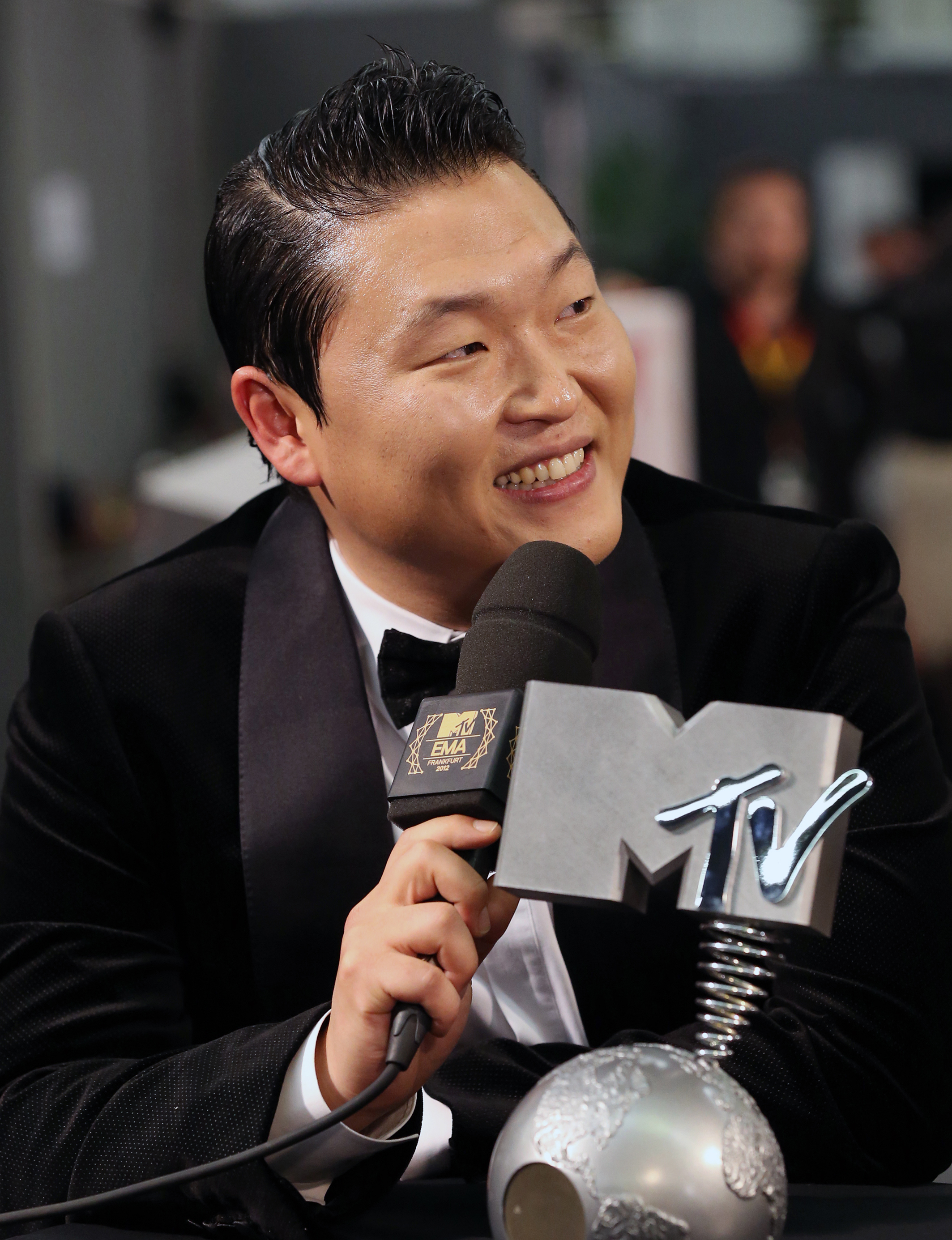
With his song "Gangnam Style", singer-songwriter Psy (pictured) was the first Korean artist to have a No. 1 hit in Mexico.

Issue date	Song	Artist(s)	Ref.
January 1	"Mujer de todos, mujer de nadie"	Calibre 50	
January 8	"¡Corre!"	Jesse & Joy	
January 15	"Llamada De Mi Ex"	La Arrolladora Banda El Limón	
January 22	"Mujer de todos, mujer de nadie"	Calibre 50	
January 29	"Mujer de todos, mujer de nadie"	Calibre 50	
February 5	"Inténtalo"	3Ball MTY ft. El Bebeto & América Sierra	
February 12	"Llamada de mi ex"	La Arrolladora Banda El Limón	
February 19	"Llamada de mi ex"	La Arrolladora Banda El Limón	
February 26	"Llamada de mi ex"	La Arrolladora Banda El Limón	
March 4	"Llamada de mi ex"	La Arrolladora Banda El Limón	
March 11	"Llamada de mi ex"	La Arrolladora Banda El Limón	
March 18	"Llamada de mi ex"	La Arrolladora Banda El Limón	
March 25	"¿De qué me sirve la vida?"	Camila	
April 1	"10 segundos"	La Adictiva Banda San José de Mesillas	
April 8	"10 segundos"	La Adictiva Banda San José de Mesillas	
April 15	"10 segundos"	La Adictiva Banda San José de Mesillas	
April 22	"La señal"	Juanes	
April 29	"La señal"	Juanes	
May 6	"La señal"	Juanes	
May 13	"La señal"	Juanes	
May 20	"La de la Mala Suerte"	Jesse & Joy	
May 27	"La de la Mala Suerte"	Jesse & Joy	
June 3	"La de la Mala Suerte"	Jesse & Joy	
June 10	"La de la Mala Suerte"	Jesse & Joy	
June 17	"La de la Mala Suerte"	Jesse & Joy	
June 24	"La de la Mala Suerte"	Jesse & Joy	
July 1	"La de la Mala Suerte"	Jesse & Joy	
July 8	"Un Hombre Normal"	Espinoza Paz	
July 15	"Un Hombre Normal"	Espinoza Paz	
July 22	"No me compares"	Alejandro Sanz	
July 29	"No me compares"	Alejandro Sanz	
August 5	"No me compares"	Alejandro Sanz	
August 12	"Uno más uno"	Andrés Cuervo	
August 19	"Uno más uno"	Andrés Cuervo	
August 26	"Uno más uno"	Andrés Cuervo	
September 2	"Uno más uno"	Andrés Cuervo	
September 9	"Uno más uno"	Andrés Cuervo	
September 16	"Uno más uno"	Andrés Cuervo	
September 23	"Uno más uno"	Andrés Cuervo	
September 30	"Uno más uno"	Andrés Cuervo	
October 7	"Aguaje activado"	Calibre 50	
October 14	"Aguaje activado"	Calibre 50	
October 21	"Gangnam Style"	Psy	
October 28	"Gangnam Style"	Psy	
November 4	"Gangnam Style"	Psy	
November 11	"Aguaje activado"	Calibre 50	
November 18	"Aguaje activado"	Calibre 50	
November 25	"Volví a Nacer"	Carlos Vives	
December 2	"Volví a Nacer"	Carlos Vives	
December 9	"Volví a Nacer"	Carlos Vives	
December 16	"Aguaje activado"	Calibre 50	
December 23	"Te extraño"	Andrés Cuervo	
December 30	"Te extraño"	Andrés Cuervo	

=== Pop ===
Issue date	Song	Artist(s)	Ref.
January 1	"La noche"	Gloria Trevi	
January 8	"¡Corre!"	Jesse & Joy	
January 15	"¡Corre!"	Jesse & Joy	
January 22	"¡Corre!"	Jesse & Joy	
February 12	"¡Corre!"	Jesse & Joy	
February 19	"¡Corre!"	Jesse & Joy	
February 26	"¡Corre!"	Jesse & Joy	
March 18	"¿De qué me sirve la vida?"	Camila	
March 25	"¿De qué me sirve la vida?"	Camila	
April 22	"Creo en ti"	Reik	
May 13	"La de la Mala Suerte"	Jesse & Joy	
May 20	"La de la Mala Suerte"	Jesse & Joy	
May 27	"La de la Mala Suerte"	Jesse & Joy	
June 3	"La de la Mala Suerte"	Jesse & Joy	
June 10	"La de la Mala Suerte"	Jesse & Joy	
June 17	"La de la Mala Suerte"	Jesse & Joy	
June 24	"La de la Mala Suerte"	Jesse & Joy	
July 1	"La de la Mala Suerte"	Jesse & Joy	
July 8	"La de la Mala Suerte"	Jesse & Joy	
July 15	"La de la Mala Suerte"	Jesse & Joy	
July 22	"La de la Mala Suerte"	Jesse & Joy	
July 29	"No me compares"	Alejandro Sanz	
August 5	"No me compares"	Alejandro Sanz	
August 12	"No me compares"	Alejandro Sanz	
August 19	"No me compares"	Alejandro Sanz	
August 26	"No me compares"	Alejandro Sanz	
September 23	"Te fuiste de aquí"	Reik	
September 30	"Te fuiste de aquí"	Reik	
October 7	"Te fuiste de aquí"	Reik	
November 11	"¿Con quién se queda el perro?"	Jesse & Joy	
November 18	"Manías"	Thalía	
November 25	"Manías"	Thalía	
December 2	"Manías"	Thalía	
December 9	"Manías"	Thalía	
December 16	"Manías"	Thalía	
December 23	"Manías"	Thalía	
December 30	"Manías"	Thalía	

=== Regional ===
Issue date	Song	Artist(s)	Ref.
January 1	"Mujer de todos, mujer de nadie"	Calibre 50	
January 8	"Mujer de todos, mujer de nadie"	Calibre 50	
January 15	"Llamada De Mi Ex"	La Arrolladora Banda El Limón	
January 22	"Mujer de todos, mujer de nadie"	Calibre 50	
February 19	"Llamada de mi ex"	La Arrolladora Banda El Limón	
February 26	"Llamada de mi ex"	La Arrolladora Banda El Limón	
March 11	"Llamada de mi ex"	La Arrolladora Banda El Limón	
March 18	"Llamada de mi ex"	La Arrolladora Banda El Limón	
March 25	"10 segundos"	La Adictiva Banda San José de Mesillas	
April 15	"10 segundos"	La Adictiva Banda San José de Mesillas	
April 22	"10 segundos"	La Adictiva Banda San José de Mesillas	
May 6	"Gente batallosa"	Calibre 50 ft. Banda Carnaval	
May 13	"Gente batallosa"	Calibre 50 ft. Banda Carnaval	
May 20	"Gente batallosa"	Calibre 50 ft. Banda Carnaval	
May 27	"Gente batallosa"	Calibre 50 ft. Banda Carnaval	
June 3	"Gente batallosa"	Calibre 50 ft. Banda Carnaval	
June 10	"Gente batallosa"	Calibre 50 ft. Banda Carnaval	
June 17	"Gente batallosa"	Calibre 50 ft. Banda Carnaval	
June 24	"Gente batallosa"	Calibre 50 ft. Banda Carnaval	
July 1	"Gente batallosa"	Calibre 50 ft. Banda Carnaval	
July 8	"Se te está acabando el tiempo"	La Adictiva Banda San José de Mesillas	
July 15	"Cabecita dura"	La Arrolladora Banda El Limón	
July 22	"Cabecita dura"	La Arrolladora Banda El Limón	
July 29	"Se te está acabando el tiempo"	La Adictiva Banda San José de Mesillas	
August 5	"Cabecita dura"	La Arrolladora Banda El Limón	
August 12	"Cabecita dura"	La Arrolladora Banda El Limón	
August 19	"Se te está acabando el tiempo"	La Adictiva Banda San José de Mesillas	
August 26	"Se te está acabando el tiempo"	La Adictiva Banda San José de Mesillas	
September 2	"Se te está acabando el tiempo"	La Adictiva Banda San José de Mesillas	
September 9	"Se te está acabando el tiempo"	La Adictiva Banda San José de Mesillas	
September 16	"Aguaje activado"	Calibre 50	
September 23	"Aguaje activado"	Calibre 50	
September 30	"Aguaje activado"	Calibre 50	
October 7	"Aguaje activado"	Calibre 50	
October 14	"Aguaje activado"	Calibre 50	
October 21	"Aguaje activado"	Calibre 50	
October 28	"Aguaje activado"	Calibre 50	
November 4	"Aguaje activado"	Calibre 50	
November 11	"Aguaje activado"	Calibre 50	
November 18	"Aguaje activado"	Calibre 50	
November 25	"Aguaje activado"	Calibre 50	
December 2	"Aguaje activado"	Calibre 50	
December 9	"Aguaje activado"	Calibre 50	
December 16	"Aguaje activado"	Calibre 50	
December 23	"Aguaje activado"	Calibre 50	
December 30	"Aguaje activado"	Calibre 50	

=== English ===
Issue date	Song (Audience)	Song (Spins)	Ref
January 1	"Moves like Jagger"^{Maroon 5 featuring Christina Aguilera}	"Moves like Jagger"^{Maroon 5 featuring Christina Aguilera}	
January 8	"Moves like Jagger"^{Maroon 5 featuring Christina Aguilera}	"Moves like Jagger"^{Maroon 5 featuring Christina Aguilera}	
January 15	"Party Rock Anthem"^{LMFAO}	"Moves like Jagger"^{Maroon 5 featuring Christina Aguilera}	
January 22	"Moves like Jagger"^{Maroon 5 featuring Christina Aguilera}	"Moves like Jagger"^{Maroon 5 featuring Christina Aguilera}	
January 29	"We Found Love"^{Rihanna}	"We Found Love"^{Rihanna}	
February 5	"We Found Love"^{Rihanna}	"We Found Love"^{Rihanna}	
February 12	"We Found Love"^{Rihanna}	"We Found Love"^{Rihanna}	
February 19	"We Found Love"^{Rihanna}	"We Found Love"^{Rihanna}	
February 26	"We Found Love"^{Rihanna}	"We Found Love"^{Rihanna}	
March 4	"We Found Love"^{Rihanna}	"We Found Love"^{Rihanna}	
March 11	"We Found Love"^{Rihanna}	"We Found Love"^{Rihanna}	
March 18	"We Found Love"^{Rihanna}	"We Found Love"^{Rihanna}	
March 25	"We Found Love"^{Rihanna}	"We Found Love"^{Rihanna}	
April 1	"We Found Love"^{Rihanna}	"We Found Love"^{Rihanna}	
April 8	"We Found Love"^{Rihanna}	"We Found Love"^{Rihanna}	
April 15	"Set Fire to the Rain"^{Adele}	"We Found Love"^{Rihanna}	
April 22	"We Found Love"^{Rihanna}	"We Found Love"^{Rihanna}	
April 29	"We Found Love"^{Rihanna}	"We Found Love"^{Rihanna}	
May 6	"We Found Love"^{Rihanna}	"We Found Love"^{Rihanna}	
May 13	"What Makes You Beautiful"^{One Direction}	"What Makes You Beautiful"^{One Direction}	
May 20	"What Makes You Beautiful"^{One Direction}	"What Makes You Beautiful"^{One Direction}	
May 27	"What Makes You Beautiful"^{One Direction}	"What Makes You Beautiful"^{One Direction}	
June 3	"What Makes You Beautiful"^{One Direction}	"We Are Young"^{Fun featuring Janelle Monáe}	
June 10	"We Are Young"^{Fun featuring Janelle Monáe}	"We Are Young"^{Fun featuring Janelle Monáe}	
June 17	"We Are Young"^{Fun featuring Janelle Monáe}	"We Are Young"^{Fun featuring Janelle Monáe}	
June 24	"We Are Young"^{Fun featuring Janelle Monáe}	"We Are Young"^{Fun featuring Janelle Monáe}	
July 1	"We Are Young"^{Fun featuring Janelle Monáe}	"We Are Young"^{Fun featuring Janelle Monáe}	
July 8	"We Are Young"^{Fun featuring Janelle Monáe}	"We Are Young"^{Fun featuring Janelle Monáe}	
July 15	"We Are Young"^{Fun featuring Janelle Monáe}	"We Are Young"^{Fun featuring Janelle Monáe}	
July 22	"We Are Young"^{Fun featuring Janelle Monáe}	"We Are Young"^{Fun featuring Janelle Monáe}	
July 29	"We Are Young"^{Fun featuring Janelle Monáe}	"We Are Young"^{Fun featuring Janelle Monáe}	
August 5	"Where Have You Been"^{Rihanna}	"Where Have You Been"^{Rihanna}	
August 12	"Where Have You Been"^{Rihanna}	"Where Have You Been"^{Rihanna}	
August 19	"Where Have You Been"^{Rihanna}	"Where Have You Been"^{Rihanna}	
August 26	"Where Have You Been"^{Rihanna}	"Where Have You Been"^{Rihanna}	
September 2	"Where Have You Been"^{Rihanna}	"Where Have You Been"^{Rihanna}	
September 9	"Where Have You Been"^{Rihanna}	"Where Have You Been"^{Rihanna}	
September 16	"Where Have You Been"^{Rihanna}	"Where Have You Been"^{Rihanna}	
September 23	"Where Have You Been"^{Rihanna}	"Where Have You Been"^{Rihanna}	
September 30	"Gangnam Style"^{PSY}	"Gangnam Style"^{PSY}	
October 7	"Gangnam Style"^{PSY}	"Gangnam Style"^{PSY}	
October 14	"Gangnam Style"^{PSY}	"Gangnam Style"^{PSY}	
October 21	"Gangnam Style"^{PSY}	"Gangnam Style"^{PSY}	
October 28	"Gangnam Style"^{PSY}	"Gangnam Style"^{PSY}	
November 4	"Gangnam Style"^{PSY}	"Gangnam Style"^{PSY}	
November 11	"Gangnam Style"^{PSY}	"Gangnam Style"^{PSY}	
November 18	"Gangnam Style"^{PSY}	"Gangnam Style"^{PSY}	
November 25	"Gangnam Style"^{PSY}	"Gangnam Style"^{PSY}	
December 2	"Gangnam Style"^{PSY}	"Gangnam Style"^{PSY}	
December 9	"Gangnam Style"^{PSY}	"Gangnam Style"^{PSY}	
December 16	"Gangnam Style"^{PSY}	"Gangnam Style"^{PSY}	
December 23	"Gangnam Style"^{PSY}	"Gangnam Style"^{PSY}	
December 30	"Gangnam Style"^{PSY}	"Gangnam Style"^{PSY}	

== See also ==
- List of Top 20 songs for 2012 in Mexico
- List of number-one albums of 2012 (Mexico)
