= Soltando al Perro =

Live album by Jesse & Joy
- Released: March 25, 2014
- Genre: Latin
- Label: Warner Music Mexico
- Producer: Charly García

Jesse & Joy chronology
¿Con Quién Se Queda El Perro? (2011)	Soltando al Perro (2014)	Un Besito Más (2015)

Soltando al Perro (English: Letting the Dog Go) is the first live album released by Jesse & Joy. Launched by Warner Music Mexico on March 25, 2014, it includes a DVD documenting the ¿Con Quién Se Queda El Perro? Tour, as well as the music video for the song "Me Quiero Enamorar". "Mi Tesoro" served as the opening theme for the novela Qué pobres tan ricos starring Jaime Camil and Zuria Vega.

== Track listing ==
No.	Title	Length
1.	"Aquí Voy (Live)"	3:05
2.	"Espacio Sideral (Live)"	3:43
3.	"¿Con Quién se queda el Perro? (Live)"	3:14
4.	"¡Corre! (Live)"	6:16
5.	"La de la Mala Suerte (Live)"	4:47
6.	"Me Quiero Enamorar (Live)"	4:03
7.	"Tú Mi Poesía (Live)"	3:58
8.	"Aquí Voy"	3:07
9.	"¿Con Quién Se Queda El Perro?"	3:08
10.	"¡Cómo No!"	3:36
11.	"¡Corre!"	4:49
12.	"Gotitas de Amor"	3:13
13.	"La de la Mala Suerte"	4:11
14.	"Quiero Que Me Quieras"	3:02
15.	"Me Llora el Cielo"	3:47
16.	"Tú Mi Poesia"	4:00
17.	"Veneno"	3:51
18.	"Me Voy"	3:27
19.	"Me Quiero Enamorar"	3:59

=== Additional tracks ===
No.	Title	Length
18.	"Mi Tesoro"	3:29
19.	"Corazón de Campeón"	3:38
20.	"Llorar (featuring Mario Domm)"	3:56

== DVD ==
No.	Title	Length
1.	"Tour Documentary"
2.	"Me Quiero Enamorar"
3.	"Me Quiero Enamorar (Behind The Scenes)"
