= 2013 Premios Juventud =

10th Premios Juventud
- Date: July 18, 2013
- Location: Watsco Center in Coral Gables, Florida
- Hosted by: Eduardo Yañez, Erika Buenfil
- Website: Official Page

Television/radio coverage
- Network: Univision

The 10th Annual Premios Juventud (Youth Awards) were broadcast by Univision on July 18, 2013.

== Performers ==
- Abraham Mateo — "Señorita"
- Maite Perroni — "Tú Y Yo"
- Lucero — "No Pudiste Amar Así"
- Ricky Martin — "Come With Me"
- Pitbull & Jennifer López — Medley: "On The Floor", "Don't Stop The Party", "Dance Again" And "Live It Up"
- Thalía — "Manías"
- J Álvarez — "La Pregunta"
- Jencarlos Canela — "I Love It"
- Marc Anthony — "Vivir Mi Vida"
- Eiza González & Marconi — "Me Puedes Pedir Lo Que Sea"
- El Dasa — "Mentirosa"
- Prince Royce — "Darte Un Beso"
- J Balvin — "Yo Te Lo Dije"
- Chino y Nacho — "Sin Ti"
- Pee Wee — "Duele Decirte Adiós"
- Víctor Manuelle — "Me Llamaré Tuyo"
- Yandel — "Hablé De Ti"

== Winners and nominations ==
Bold denotes winner not revealed during the ceremony.

| Category | Sub - Categories | Winner | Other Nominees |
|---|---|---|---|
| Soap Opera | ¡Está Buenísimo! (He's fine!) | **Sebastián Rulli** - (Amores Verdaderos) | Cristián de la Fuente - (Amor Bravío); Eduardo Yáñez - (Amores Verdaderos); Fernando Colunga - (Porque el Amor Manda); Jaime Camil - (Por Ella Soy Eva) |
| Soap Opera | Chica Que Me Quita el Sueño (Girl that wakes me up!) | **Blanca Soto** - (Porque el Amor Manda) | Eiza González - (Amores Verdaderos); Lucero - (Por Ella Soy Eva); Marjorie De Sousa - (Amores Verdaderos); Silvia Navarro - (Amor Bravío) |
| Soap Opera | Mejor Tema Novelero (Best Soap Opera song) | **"Me Puedes Pedir Lo Que Sea"** - Marconi & Eiza González (Amores Verdaderos) | "Cuando Manda el Corazón" - Vicente Fernández (Amor Bravío); "Llorar" - Jesse & Joy & Mario Domm (Corona de Lágrimas); "No Me Compares" - Alejandro Sanz (Amores Verdaderos); "Porque el Amor Manda" - América Sierra & 3BallMTY (Porque el Amor Manda) |
| Film | Película Más Padre (Favorite Flick) | **Girl in Progress** | End of Watch; No; Rock of Ages; Savages |
| Film | ¡Qué Actorazo! (Can He Act or What?) | **Antonio Banderas** - (Puss in Boots: The Three Diablos) | Benicio Del Toro - (Savages); Demián Bichir - (Savages); Eugenio Derbez - (Girl in Progress); Gael García Bernal - (No) |
| Film | Actriz que se Roba la Pantalla (Actress who Steals the Show) | **Jennifer Lopez** - (What to Expect When You're Expecting) | Kate del Castillo - (K-11); Salma Hayek - (Savages); Sofía Vergara - (The Three Stooges); Zoe Saldaña - (The Words) |
| Music | La Combinacion Perfecta (The Perfect Combination) | **"Llorar"** - Jesse & Joy & Mario Domm | "Algo Me Gusta De Tí" - Wisin y Yandel, Chris Brown & T-Pain; "Más y Más" - Draco Rosa & Ricky Martin; "¿Por Qué Les Mientes?" - Tito el Bambino & Marc Anthony; "Te Perdiste Mi Amor" - Thalía & Prince Royce |
| Music | ¡Qué Rico se Mueve! (Best Moves) | **Shakira** | Chayanne; Pitbull; Ricky Martin; Romeo Santos; Shakira |
| Music | Voz del Momento (Voice of the Moment) | **Prince Royce** | Gerardo Ortíz; Jesse & Joy; Pitbull; Romeo Santos |
| Music | La Más Pegajosa (Catchiest Tune) | **"Incondicional"** - Prince Royce | "Contigo En La Cama" - Christian Pagán & Gigi; "Es Un Drama" - Dulce María; "Limbo" - Daddy Yankee; "Llévame Contigo" - Romeo Santos |
| Music | Lo Toco Todo (Song that speaks about everything) | **Phase II** - Prince Royce | El Primer Ministro - Gerardo Ortíz; Habítame Siempre - Thalía; La Fórmula - Varios Artistas; Prestige - Daddy Yankee |
| Music | El Súper Tour (The Super Tour) | **Mi Despedida Tour** - Vicente Fernández | Líderes World Tour - Wisin y Yandel; Phase II Tour - Prince Royce; Planet Pit World Tour - Pitbull; The King Stays King Tour - Romeo Santos |
| Music | Canción Corta-venas (Best Ballad) | **"Llorar"** - Jesse & Joy & Mario Domm | "Desde Que Se Fue" - Christian Pagán; "Incondicional" - Prince Royce; "Llévame Contigo" - Romeo Santos; "No Me Compares" - Alejandro Sanz |
| Music | Mi Video Favorito (My favorite Video) | **"Incondicional"** - Prince Royce | "Amor Confuso" - Gerardo Ortíz; "Es Un Drama" - Dulce María; "Limbo" - Daddy Yankee; "Más y Más" - Draco Rosa & Ricky Martin |
| Music | Mi Ringtone (My Ringtone) | **"La Misma Gran Señora"** - Jenni Rivera | "Es En Drama" - Dulce María; "Incondicional" - Prince Royce; "La Misma Gran Señora" - Jenni Rivera; "Limbo" - Daddy Yankee; "Llévame Contigo" - Romeo Santos |
| Music | Mi Artista Regional Mexicano (Favorite Regional Mexican Artist) | **Jenni Rivera** | Banda el Recodo; Gerardo Ortíz; La Arrolladora Banda El Limón de René Camacho; Larry Hernández |
| Music | Mi Artista Rock (Favorite Rock Artist) | **Maná** | Beto Cuevas; Juanes; Moderatto; Molotov |
| Music | Mi Artista Pop (Favorite Pop Artist) | **Jenni Rivera** | Dulce María; Jesse & Joy; Matt Hunter; Thalía |
| Music | Mi Artista Tropical (Favorite Tropical Artist) | **Prince Royce** | Gremal Maldonado; Olga Tañón; Romeo Santos; Víctor Manuelle |
| Music | Mi Artista Urbano (Favorite Urban Artist) | **Pitbull** | Daddy Yankee; Don Omar; Lápiz Conciente; Wisin y Yandel |
| Music | Favorite HitMaker | **Bruno Mars** | Adele; Justin Bieber; Rihanna; Usher |
| Music | Favorite Hit | **"When I Was Your Man"** - Bruno Mars | "Diamonds" - Rihanna; "Feel This Moment" - Pitbull & Christina Aguilera; "Gangnam Style" - PSY; "Locked Out of Heaven" - Bruno Mars |
| Music | Revelacion Juvenil (Revelation Young) | **Kevin Ortiz** | Abraham Mateo; Becky G; El Dasa; Jonathan Moly; Kat Dahlia; Sonus; Valentino |
| Music | Canción del Verano (Song of Summer) | **I Love It** - Jencarlos Canela | |
| Sports | El Deportista de Alto Voltaje (Most Electrifying Guy Jock) | **Javier Hernández** | Javier Hernández; Javier Culson; JJ Barea; Lionel Messi; Robinson Canó |
| Sports | La nueva Promesa (The New Pledge) | **Félix "El Diamante" Verdejo** | Félix "El Diamante" Verdejo; Javier Aquino; Neymar Da Silva Santos Júnior; Raúl Alonso Jiménez; Tommy Ramos |
| Pop Culture | Siganme Los Buenos (Follow me The Good) | **Jenni Rivera** | Larry Hernández; Prince Royce; Ricky Martin; Thalía |
| Pop Culture | Mi DJ Favorito | **Argelia Atilano** | Amos Morales; Raúl Brindis; Rodolfo "El Chamo" Soules |

== Special awards ==
- Supernova: Eugenio Derbez
- The Best Dressed Award: Marjorie De Sousa, Gerardo Ortíz
- Icono Mundial: Jennifer Lopez
