= Esto Es lo Que Soy =

EP by Jesse & Joy
- Released: 2008
- Genre: Pop
- Length: 19:03
- Label: Warner Music México
- Producer: Jesse Huerta

Jesse & Joy chronology
Esta Es Mi Vida Sesiones (2007)	Esto Es lo Que Soy (2008)	Electricidad (2009)

Singles from Esto Es lo Que Soy
- 1. "Esto Es lo Que Soy" Released: 2008

Professional ratings
Review scores
Source	Rating
Allmusic	[Not Rated] Link

Esto Es Lo Que Soy (English: This Is What I Am) is the first extended play (EP) released by Jesse & Joy. It was launched in early 2008, and it contains all of their singles from Esta Es Mi Vida, excepting for "Somos lo Que Fue". It also contains a self-titled song, which served as the theme song for the Mexican soap opera Las Tontas No Van al Cielo.

== Track listing ==
1. "Esto Es lo Que Soy" – 3:32
2. "Espacio Sideral" – 3:43
3. "Ya No Quiero" – 3:27
4. "Volveré" - 3:50
5. "Llegaste Tú" - 4:06

== Credits ==
- Produced by Jesse Huerta.
- Joy Huerta - Lead vocals.
- Jesse Huerta - Guitars, bass and background vocals.
- Tomas - Drums and tambourine.
- Raal - Recorder and engineered.
- Benny Faccone - Mixer

== Charts ==
Chart	Peak position
Mexican Albums Chart	51
