= Me voy =

Me Voy (English: I'm Leaving) may refer to:

- "Me Voy" (Aventura song), later covered by Héctor Acosta
- "Me Voy" (Gloria Estefan song)
- "Me Voy" (Jesse & Joy song)
- "Me Voy" (Julieta Venegas song)
- "Me Voy" (Paulina Rubio song)
- "Me Voy", a song by Camila, included on their album Dejarte de Amar (2010)
- "Me Voy", a song by RBD, Spanish language cover of Kelly Clarkson's "Gone", included on their album Nuestro Amor
- "Me Voy", 2024 song by Tini from Un Mechón de Pelo

== See also ==
- "Hoy Me Voy", a song by Juanes from the album La Vida... Es Un Ratico (2007)
- "Hoy Ya Me Voy", a song by Kany García from the album Cualquier Día (2007)
