= Esta Es Mi Vida =

2006 album by Jesse & Joy

Studio album by Jesse & Joy
- Released: August 22, 2006
- Recorded: 2005–2006
- Genre: Pop
- Length: 44:00
- Label: Warner Music Mexico
- Producer: Kiko Cibrián

Jesse & Joy chronology
Esta Es Mi Vida (2006)	Esta Es Mi Vida Sesiones (2007)

Singles from Esta Es Mi Vida
- 1. "Espacio Sideral" Released: 2007; 2. "Ya No Quiero" Released: 2007; 3. "Volveré" Released: 2007; 4. "Llegaste Tú" Released: 2008; 5. "Somos Lo Que Fue" Released: 2008

Esta Es Mi Vida Sesiones

Studio album by Jesse & Joy
- Released: March 27, 2007
- Recorded: 2007
- Genre: Pop
- Length: 50:29
- Label: Warner Music Mexico
- Producer: Kiko Cibrián

Jesse & Joy chronology
Esta Es Mi Vida (2006)	Esta Es Mi Vida Sesiones (2007)	Esto Es lo Que Soy (2008)

Esta Es Mi Vida (English: This Is My Life) is the debut album by duo Jesse & Joy, consisting of siblings Jesse and Joy Huerta. The album was released by Warner Music Mexico on August 22, 2006. The album debuted at number 22 on Mexican Top 100 Album Chart and peaked at number 7. The Asociación Mexicana de Productores de Fonogramas y Videogramas (AMPROFON) certified the album as Platinum for selling more than 100,000 copies in Mexico. They promoted their album in Puerto Rico, Spain and Latin America.

Five singles were released from the album: "Espacio Sideral", "Ya No Quiero", "Volveré", "Llegaste Tú" and "Somos Lo Que Fue". "Espacio Sideral" reached the number 35 on the Billboard Hot Latin Songs chart, and was certified as Gold in Mexico by the AMPROFON. "Ya No Quiero" reached the number 40 in the Hot Latin Songs, while "Llegaste Tú" the number 32. An acoustic "sessions" version was released in March 2007, titled Esta Es Mi Vida Sesiones. It includes songs by Jesse & Joy and a cover of "Ironic" (1995) by Alanis Morissette. On August 29, 2007 the album received a Latin Grammy nomination for Best Pop Album by a Duo/Group with Vocals. In 2008 an extended play, titled Esto Es Lo Que Soy, was released. It includes the singles released from Esta Es Mi Vida (excepting "Somos Lo Que Fue"), and a new single called "Esto Es Lo Que Soy".

== Track listing ==
All songs written by Jesse and Joy Huerta, except where noted.

No.	Title	Writer(s)	Length
1.	"Dulce Melodía"		3:46
2.	"Nadie Podrá"		3:46
3.	"Espacio Sideral"		3:42
4.	"Llegaste Tú"		4:05
5.	"Cielo Azul"		2:58
6.	"Ya No Quiero"		3:28
7.	"Mi Sol"		3:31
8.	"Quiero Conocerte"		4:03
9.	"Volveré"		3:50
10.	"Esta Es Mi Vida"		3:18
11.	"Somos Lo Que Fue" (featuring Noel Schajris)	Jesse Huerta, Joy Huerta, Noel Schajris	4:11
12.	"Ser o Estar (Si Tú No Estás)" (featuring Leonel García)		3:22
Total length:			44:00

Esta Es Mi Vida (Edición Espacial)
No.	Title	Length
13.	"Espacio Sideral (Versión Espacial)"	4:19
14.	"Ya No Quiero (Versión Espacial)"	3:45
15.	"Volveré (Versión Espacial)"	4:13
16.	"Llegaste Tú (Versión Espacial)"	4:13
Total length:		56:17

Esta Es Mi Vida Sesiones track listing
No.	Title	Writer(s)	Length
1.	"Esto Es Lo Que Soy (En Estudio)"		3:47
2.	"Sapo Azul (En Estudio)"		3:29
3.	"Ser o Estar (En Estudio)"		2:54
4.	"U Rock (En Estudio)"		3:56
5.	"Ironic (En Estudio)"	Alanis Morissette, Glen Ballard	4:15
6.	"Espacio Sideral (En Vivo)"		4:34
7.	"Ya No Quiero (En Vivo)"		4:33
8.	"Llegaste Tú (En Vivo)"		4:31
9.	"Somos Lo Que Fue (En Vivo)"		5:56
10.	"Esta Es Mi Vida (En Vivo)"		4:09
11.	"Volveré - Esto Es Lo Que Soy (En Estudio)"		8:25
Total length:			50:29

== Credits and personnel ==
Credits adapted from Esta Es Mi Vida album notes.

- Lead vocals: Joy Huerta
- Background vocals: Jesse Huerta, Joy Huerta
- Guitar, bass and piano: Jesse Huerta
- Bass in "Nadie Podrá": Kiko Cibrián
- Additional guitar in "Espacio Sideral": James Harrat
- Drums: Ilan Rubin
- Hammond B3: Rob Whitlock
- Piano and chorus in "Somos Lo Que Fue": Noel Schajris
- Chorus in "Ser O Estar (Si Tú No Estás)": Leonel García
- Recorded by: Kiko Cibrián, Ben Moore and Julian Tydelski

== Charts ==
Chart (2006–07)	Peak position
Mexican Album Charts	17
US Latin Pop Albums	17

== Certifications ==
Region	Certification	Certified units/sales
Mexico (AMPROFON)	Platinum	100,000^{^}
United States (RIAA)	Platinum (Latin)	60,000^{‡}
^{^} Shipments figures based on certification alone.^{‡} Sales+streaming figures based on certification alone.
