= Que Pena Me Da =

Que Pena Me Da may refer to:

- "Que Pena Me Da", a song by Andy Montañez
- "Que Pena Me Da", a song by Beny Moré
- "Que Pena Me Da", a song by Jesse & Joy from Un Besito Más
- "Que Pena Me Da", a song by Marco Antonio Muñiz
- "Que Pena Me Da", a song by Machito
- "Que Pena Me Da", a song by Oscar D'León
- "Que Pena Me Da", a song by Pandora (band)
- "Que Pena Me Da", a song by Tito Rodríguez
