= Carlos López Estrada =

Mexican music video director (born 1988)

- Born: September 12, 1988 (age 37); Mexico City, Mexico
- Occupations: Filmmaker, music video director, commercial director, theatre director, actor
- Mother: Carla Estrada
- Musical career
- Website: lopezestrada.com

Carlos López Estrada (born September 12, 1988) is a Mexican-American filmmaker, music video director, commercial director, theatre director, and actor. Born in Mexico, he moved to the United States when he was 12 and later enrolled at Chapman University.

He made his feature film directorial debut in 2018 with Blindspotting, which premiered opening night at Sundance 2018 and was subsequently released by Lionsgate Entertainment. His second film, Summertime, premiered opening night of Sundance 2020 and was released in July 2021. Carlos' third film, Raya and the Last Dragon, was released by Disney in March 2021 and was nominated for an Academy Award for Best Animated Feature at the 94th Academy Awards. In November 2022, Carlos López Estrada founded Antigravity Academy: a production company and artist development platform dedicated to supporting emerging filmmakers and reimagining pathways into the film industry.

== Film ==
López Estrada directed a short film titled Identity Theft based on a one-act play written by Andrew Rothschild. It stars stage veterans Bill Irwin and Kate Burton. The film premiered at the 2015 Palm Springs International Festival of Short Films.

López Estrada directed his first feature film in 2017, Blindspotting, starring Daveed Diggs and Rafael Casal. The film, released in 2018, is semi-autobiographical and based on Diggs and Casal's lives in a rapidly gentrifying Oakland.

In October 2019, Walt Disney Animation Studios announced that they were developing a feature film with López Estrada. López Estrada was also set to direct a live-action/CGI remake of Disney's Robin Hood. López Estrada was confirmed to direct Raya and the Last Dragon with Don Hall. López Estrada left Disney in early 2022. In July 2022, López Estrada joined Nexus Studios.

On October 31, 2022, it was announced that López Estrada would write and direct the live-action adaptation of Your Name for Paramount Pictures and Bad Robot, replacing Marc Webb and Lee Isaac Chung.

In October 2025, López Estrada completed principal photography on DED, a silent film in which he also stars alongside Camila Mendes and Eugenio Derbez. The film is scheduled for release in 2026.

== Production company ==
Carlos López Estrada launched Antigravity Academy in November 2022 as a production company and artist development platform built to uplift emerging filmmakers and challenge traditional routes into the film industry.

Launched in 2023, Antigravity’s Screenwriters Camp, is a program that helps first-time feature filmmakers develop their debut projects, under the mentorship of industry veterans. With the intention to create new pathways for artists who have historically lacked access to traditional industry networks, the program kicks off with a week-long intensive in the spring and will then see writers go through several months of continued development of their works through additional drafts, virtual sessions, and a dedicated period of industry exposure.

In 2024, Antigravity partnered with Dolby Laboratories to launch a new studio, designed to amplify the voices of emerging filmmakers. Powered by Dolby Creator Lab, Antigravity’s Short Film Studio will provide filmmakers with access to the technologies of Dolby Vision and Dolby Atmos in the making of a short film, along with Antigravity’s hands-on development and production support. It is open to U.S.-based filmmakers over the age of 18 who have no prior feature film or television experience. Each creative participating will receive a $35,000 production grant. In their inaugural year, two films produced through the Short Film Studio were selected for major film festivals: Marga en el DF, directed by Gabriela Ortega, which premiered at the 2025 Sundance Film Festival and was also selected for the 2025 SXSW Film Festival, and Albatross, directed by Amandine Thomas, which premiered at the 2025 Sundance Film Festival.

== Experiential work ==
In 2024, López Estrada served as director for a series of immersive films created for UFC 306 at the Sphere in Las Vegas, the venue’s first live sporting event. The six-chapter film, For Mexico, For All Time, produced through his company Antigravity Academy in collaboration with Nexus Studios, was presented on the Sphere’s interior LED display as part of the event’s visual programming and incorporated themes of Mexican history and cultural identity.

== Music videos ==
López Estrada directed his first music video at just 19, when he directed a video for a song called Heaven by Spinlight City. The song went viral on MySpace and he directed a few videos for the band for 2 years. since then he directed videos for a variety of artists, including clipping., Thundercat, Flying Lotus, Hook n Sling, Goo Goo Dolls, Reptar, Passion Pit, El Sportivo & The Blooz, MYPET, Saint Motel, Maximum Balloon, Bowerbirds, Capital Cities and many more.

In 2011, López Estrada directed a music video for Mexican pop band Jesse & Joy of their song "Me Voy." The video, which uses stop motion and found the production team trimming 2900 photographs in order to create the sequences included, earned the title of Best Short Form Music Video at the 13th Annual Latin Grammy Awards in 2012. López Estrada also directed "Chocolate" from Electricidad for Jesse & Joy.

In 2013, López Estrada co-directed a music video for Capital Cities’ "Kangaroo Court" which features American actor Darren Criss and American actress Shannon Woodward.

López Estrada directed five videos for the experimental rap group clipping.’s major label debut titled CLPPNG. López Estrada came in contact with clipping. after befriending Jonathan Snipes, a member of the trio that makes up clipping., while López Estrada was in film school. “Work Work” was the first single from the album. Stereogum detailed López Estrada's work on the videos as being, “[An] inventive, memorable, and weirdly unsettling experience." This work led to many collaborations with rapper Daveed Diggs, a member of clipping.

In 2015, López Estrada directed a video for Thundercat's "Them Changes", which featured artists Flying Lotus and Kamasi Washington. The song is a part of Thundercat's The Beyond / Where the Giants Roam, which was his first collection of solo material in two years and placed the artist in collaboration with various others, such as Flying Lotus and Kamasi Washington, who each contributed keyboard and saxophone, respectively.

In 2018, López Estrada directed the music video for Billie Eilish's "When the Party's Over".

In 2021, López Estrada directed the music video for Katy Perry's "Electric" song in collaboration with the Pokémon franchise for its 25th anniversary.

== Television ==
In 2018, López Estrada directed the second episode of the final season of Legion, titled "Chapter 21". The episode was released in July 2019.

== Theatre ==
In October 2015, López Estrada starred in an original multimedia theatre show, titled Ded!. based on the Mexican Day of the Dead tradition, which he created and co-directed with Cristina Bercovitz. He and Bercovitz had previously worked together as co-directors on the music video for clipping.’s “GET UP.” The show ran at the Matrix Theatre in Los Angeles and was composed of an ensemble of musicians, actors and puppeteers. The show also featured a guest performance by Bill Irwin. Living Out Loud, Los Angeles praised López Estrada's pantomime and comedic performance in the show.

López Estrada directed a taping of #BARS, a live musical theatre and rap medley workshop in New York City, springing from the culmination of a six-week seminar by Rafael Casal, a poet, writer, rapper and co-creator of #BARS. The film features performances by a variety of artists, including Rafael Casal, rapper Daveed Diggs, poet Sarah Kay and nine more performers from New York City.

== Filmography ==
=== Film ===
Year	Title	Director	Writer	Producer	Notes
2018	Blindspotting	Yes	No	No	
2020	Summertime	Yes	No	Yes	
2021	Raya and the Last Dragon	Yes	Story	No	Co-directed with Don Hall
2023	Lil Nas X: Long Live Montero	Yes	No	No	Co-directed with Zac Manuel
2024	Dìdi	No	No	Yes	
2026	Ded	Yes	Yes	Yes	

Creative Leadership

- Frozen II (2019)
- Raya and the Last Dragon (2021)
- Encanto (2021)

=== Television ===
Director

Year	Title	Episode
2019	Legion	"Chapter 21"

Actor

Year	Title	Role	Notes
2006	Las dos caras de Ana	Lucas Sánchez	1 episode
2007	Pasión	Claudio Fernández de la Cueva	10 episodes
2026	Ded	Ded	Film
