= Llamada de Mi Ex =

Single by La Arrolladora Banda El Limón

from the album Irreversible 2012
- Released: January 2012
- Recorded: 2011
- Genre: Banda sinaloense
- Length: 3:06
- Label: Disa
- Songwriter: Ariel Barreras
- Producer: Fernando Camacho

"Llamada de Mi Ex" (English: "Call from My Ex") is a song written by Ariel Barreras and recorded by Mexican ensemble La Arrolladora Banda El Limón, released as a single from their album Irreversible 2012 (2012). It was nominated for Regional Mexican Song of the Year at the Premio Lo Nuestro 2013.

== Composition ==
"Llamada de Mi Ex" is a Banda song with a duration of three minutes and six seconds. The song is taken from the band's Irreversible 2012 album, and is meant to be a "fully danceable, romantic and ranchera" song.

== Chart performance ==
"Llamada de Mi Ex" became a commercial success for La Arrolladora Banda El Limón, reaching number one on the US Billboard Latin Regional Mexican Airplay chart, and number two at the Top Latin Songs chart. José Isidro Beltrán Cuen, second voice of the group, highlighted the success of the song as "unexpected", elaborating that "from the moment the song was recorded, we were told it was going to be a hit." The song also became a hit in Mexico, reaching number two position on the Billboard International chart.

== Trackslisting ==
- Album version
1. "Llamada de Mi Ex" — 3:06

== Charts ==
=== Weekly charts ===
Chart (2012)	Peak position
Mexico Top General (Monitor Latino)	1
Mexico (Billboard International)	2
US Hot Latin Songs (Billboard)	2
US Regional Mexican Airplay (Billboard)	1

=== Year-end charts ===
Chart (2012)	Position
US Hot Latin Songs (Billboard)	1

=== Decade-end charts ===
Chart (2010–2019)	Position
US Hot Latin Songs (Billboard)	30

== See also ==
- List of number-one songs of 2012 (Mexico)
- List of Top 20 songs for 2012 in Mexico
- Banda music
