= Joy Huerta =

Mexican singer (born 1986)

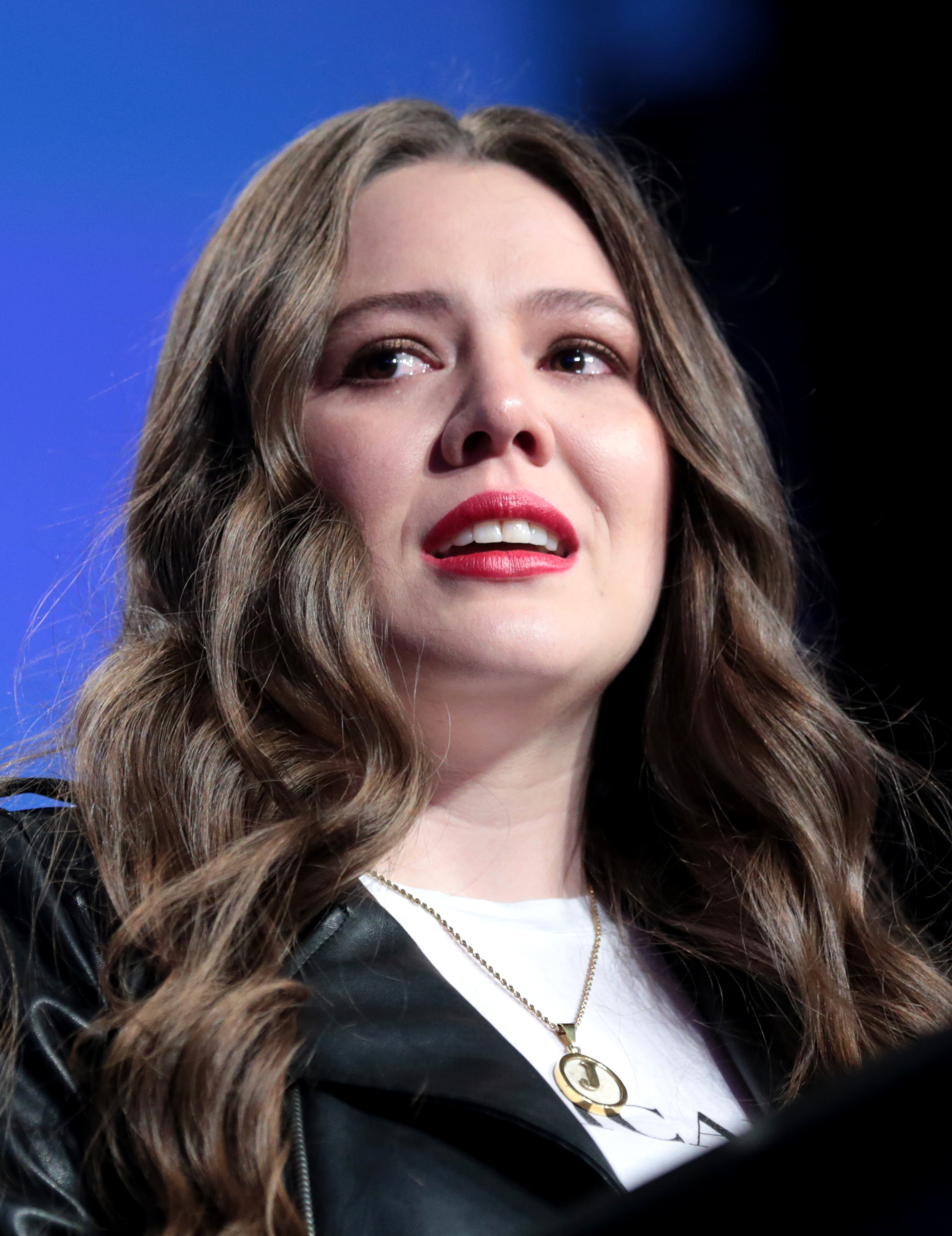
- Huerta speaking at a National Council of La Raza event in 2017

Background information
- Born: Tirzah Joy Huerta Uecke; June 20, 1986 (age 40); Mexico City, Mexico
- Genre: Latin pop
- Occupations: Singer; songwriter
- Instruments: Vocals; guitar
- Years active: 2005–present

Tirzah Joy Huerta Uecke (born June 20, 1986), known as Joy Huerta, is a Mexican singer and songwriter. Since its creation, she has served as vocalist of Jesse & Joy, a duo she forms with her older brother, Jesse Huerta.

As part of the duo, she has released seven studio albums, a live album and an EP with Warner Music Latin, toured internationally, and racked up the Grammy Award for Best Latin Album as well as six Latin Grammy Awards in various categories. "Joy's voice has been compared to Norah Jones, Alanis Morissette and, almost inevitably, Kelly Clarkson", wrote the Los Angeles Times. In 2025, Huerta was nominated for her first Tony Award nomination for Best Original Score for Real Women Have Curves.

== Early life ==
Huerta was born in Mexico City to a Mexican father, Eduardo Huerta, and an American mother, Michelle Uecke. At age 15, inspired by Aretha Franklin, James Taylor, Carole King, and Pedro Infante, as well as her parents, she began writing music and songs with her father and brother, Jesse, using instruments from the church they attended as children.

== Career ==
=== Jesse & Joy ===
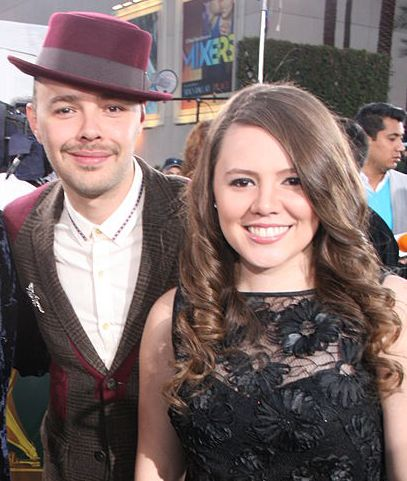
Jesse & Joy at the 13th Annual Latin Grammy Awards

The Huerta Uecke siblings signed with Warner Music Latina on April 18, 2005, and began a recording career under Jesse & Joy. In the group, he plays guitar and she is the lead vocalist.

That year, Jesse & Joy released their first single, "Espacio Sideral". The Mexican Association of Phonogram and Videogram Producers (AMPROFON) awarded the debut album Esta Es Mi Vida, a platinum record. The album reached number 20 in Mexico, and as a duo, they won the Latin Grammy Award for Best New Artist the following year. In 2009, they released a second studio album Electricidad, which received an AMPROFON gold certification.

Her next album, ¿Con Quién Se Queda el Perro?, was released in 2011, and at the 2012 Latin Grammy Awards ceremony, she and her brother won three Latin Grammy Awards: Best Contemporary Pop Album for ¿Con quién se queda el Perro?, and Song and Record of the Year for "¡Corre!". Additionally, together with Carlos López Estrada, they received the Latin Grammy Award for Best Short Form Music Video for directing "Me Voy", a single from ¿Con Quién Se Queda El Perro?.

Huerta earned her first Grammy Award for Best Latin Pop Album for the duo's fifth studio release Un Besito Más. She publicly declared her support for "all Hispanics in the United States" in her acceptance speech. Un Besito Más went to number one on the Latin Albums chart, 10 won the Latin Grammy (2016) for Best Pop Vocal Album.

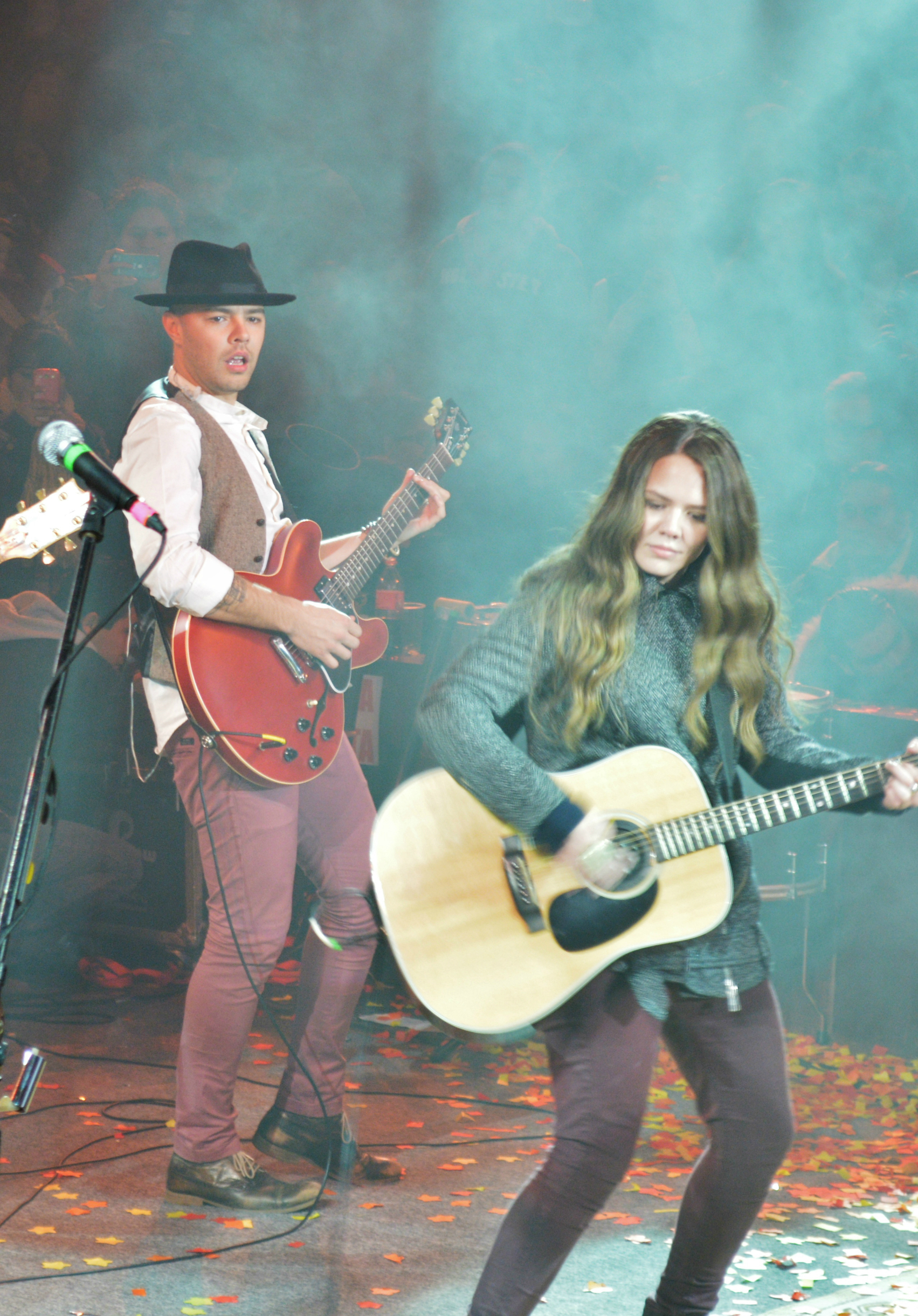
Joy and her brother performing during the ¿Con Quién Se Queda el Perro? Tour

The song "Un Besito Más" commemorates the siblings' father in a video that raised awareness about controversial deportations in the United States. The video was awarded "Best Short Narrative" and "Student Voices for Peace: Most Inspiring Story" at the Peace on Earth Festival, and "Inclusion Award" at the Wayward Festival.

In mid-2016, Jesse & Joy released of their first dual-language album, Jesse & Joy, which contained English versions of songs from their last four studio releases and major hits such as "¡Corre!" (as "Run"), "Espacio Sideral", "Ecos de Amor" (as "Echoes of Love"), among others.

Jesse & Joy collaborated with Colombian singer J Balvin for the single "Mañana Es Too Late" in April 2019 which would be the first song from his yet-to-be-titled new album. The song was written by the duo along with Poo Bear and reached number 1 in Mexico.

=== Solo work ===
In September 2018, Huerta went to Washington, D.C., to receive the Vision Award for social and humanitarian commitment at the 31st Annual Hispanic Heritage Awards, which aired on PBS. The award recognizes Latinos who have made significant contributions to music.

Huerta was recognized by the Latin Recording Academy as one of the Leading Ladies of Entertainment at a June 2019 gala in Mexico City. The recognition was directed at Latinas who "throughout their lives have continuously demonstrated enthusiasm, determination, leadership, pride in their roots and an indomitable spirit." The recognition also included Tatiana Bilboa, Martha de Bayle, Alondra de la Parra and Soumaya Slim Domit.

Huerta has participated in the reality show La Voz... México being an advisor to Aleks Syntek. The singer has also performed solo duets with the Mexican Sergio Vallin, the American duo Ha*Ash in the song "Qué más da", being part of the composition of the song, and with the singer of Cuban origin Jencarlos Canela in the song "Por algo será". Joy has lent her voice on numerous occasions in concerts that she has been invited by Ha*Ash, on songs such as "Already Home", "Lo Que Yo Sé de Ti", "Te Dejo en Libertad", "No Tiene Devolución" and "Qué más da".

In 2024, Huerta voiced Honey Bee in the Dominican animated film Captain Avispa. Huerta received her first nomination at the 78th Tony Awards for Best Original Score for her work as co-composer of the Broadway musical Real Women Have Curves, alongside co-composer Benjamin Velez.

In May 2025, Huerta collaborated with Foreigner in releasing a Spanish-language version of "I Want to Know What Love Is", titled "Quiero Saber Si es Amor".

== Philanthropy ==
Beyond her music career, Huerta focuses her efforts on improving the treatment of animals through organizations such as PETA and Animal Heroes. She worked with rescue organizations after the earthquake in Mexico City, including the Red Cross. Additionally, she has performed shows in California, Texas, and Arizona to mobilize Latinos to vote in support of Rock the Vote, Voto Latino, and Grammys the Hill. Joy maintains a partnership with UnidosUS (formerly NCLR), the Hispanic civil rights and advocacy organization, and its "Electrify Your Vote" campaign. Jesse & Joy performed acoustic shows in California, Texas, and Arizona with the intent of mobilizing Latinos to vote.

== Personal life ==
She has been friends with the duo Ha*Ash for over 10 years, sharing a house for a couple of years with her best friend Grace. In addition, they have been inspired by each other's stories to compose songs, which is why "La de la Mala Suerte" by Jesse & Joy is based on Ashley's story, while "Ex de Verdad" by the sisters, on Joy's story.

In April 2019, she came out as a lesbian and introduced her wife Diana Atri, with whom she announced that she was expecting a baby. Their first child was born in May of the same year, a girl they named Noah. In March 2021, she announced the birth of her second child, a boy they named Nour.
