= Un Besito Más =

Studio album by Jesse & Joy
- Released: December 4, 2015
- Genres: Latin rock, Latin pop, pop rock
- Length: 47:29
- Label: Warner Music Mexico
- Producers: Fraser T. Smith; Martin Terefe; Jesse Huerta; Tommy Torres; Juan Luis Guerra

Jesse & Joy chronology
Soltando al Perro (2014)	Un Besito Más (2015)	Jesse & Joy (2017)

Singles from Un Besito Más
- 1. "Ecos de Amor" Released: August 14, 2015; 2. "No Soy Una de Esas" Released: November 30, 2015; 3. "Dueles" Released: July 5, 2016; 4. "Me Soltaste" Released: February 9, 2017; 5. "Un Besito Más" Released: July 11, 2017; 6. "3 A.M." Released: August 18, 2017

Un Besito Más (One More Kiss) is the fourth studio album released by Jesse & Joy on December 4, 2015. Its lead single, "Ecos de Amor", was released on August 14, 2015. "Ecos de Amor" is also featured in the Mexican telenovela Pasión y Poder.

At the 17th Annual Latin Grammy Awards, the album received a nomination for Album of the Year and won for Best Contemporary Pop Vocal Album and "Ecos de Amor" was nominated for Song of the Year and Record of the Year. Un Besito Mas also won a Grammy Award for Best Latin Pop Album and was nominated for a Lo Nuestro Award for Pop Album of the Year.

== Track listing ==
No.	Title	Writer(s)	Producer(s)	Length
1.	"Qué Pena Me Da"	Jesse & Joy; Descemer Bueno	Jesse; Fraser T Smith	3:17
2.	"Ecos de Amor"	Jesse & Joy; Danelle Leverett; Jason Reeves; Rune Westberg	Jesse; Smith	3:35
3.	"No Soy Una de Esas" (featuring Alejandro Sanz)	Jesse & Joy; Tommy Torres; Alejandro Sanz	Jesse; Smith	3:30
4.	"Me Soltaste"	Jesse & Joy; Torres	Jesse; Smith	3:49
5.	"3 A.M." (featuring Tommy Torres and Gente de Zona)	Jesse & Joy; Torres	Jesse; Torres	3:19
6.	"¡Ay Doctor!"	Jesse & Joy	Martin Terefe; Torres	3:24
7.	"Muero de Amor"	Jesse & Joy	Terefe; Jesse	3:58
8.	"Dime Que No"	Jesse & Joy; Torres	Terefe; Jesse	4:10
9.	"More Than Amigos"	Jesse & Joy; Smith	Jesse; Smith	3:25
10.	"Un Besito Más" (featuring Juan Luis Guerra)	Jesse & Joy	Guerra; Jesse	3:12
11.	"Dueles"	Jesse & Joy; Terefe; Cass Lowe	Terefe; Jesse	4:07
12.	"Quiéreme Despacito"	Jesse & Joy; Torres	Jesse; Smith	3:46
13.	"El Malo"	Jesse & Joy; Torres	Jesse	3:51

== Charts ==
=== Weekly charts ===
Chart (2015)	Peak position
Spanish Albums (PROMUSICAE)	72
US Top Latin Albums (Billboard)	1
US Latin Pop Albums (Billboard)	1

=== Year-end charts ===
Chart (2016)	Position
US Top Latin Albums (Billboard)	30

=== Certifications ===
Region	Certification	Certified units/sales
Chile	Gold	20,000
Mexico (AMPROFON)	Platinum	60,000^{^}
United States (RIAA)	Gold (Latin)	30,000^{‡}
^{^} Shipments figures based on certification alone.^{‡} Sales+streaming figures based on certification alone.

== Awards and nominations ==
Year	Ceremony	Award	Nominated	Result	Ref.
2016	Latin Grammy Awards	Album of the Year	Un Besito Mas	Nominated	
2016	Latin Grammy Awards	Best Contemporary Pop Vocal Album	Un Besito Mas	Won	
2016	Latin Grammy Awards	Record of the Year	"Ecos de Amor"	Nominated	
2016	Latin Grammy Awards	Song of the Year	"Ecos de Amor"	Nominated	
2017	Grammy Awards	Best Latin Pop Album	Un Besito Mas	Won	
2017	Lo Nuestro Awards	Pop Album of the Year	Un Besito Mas	Nominated	
2017	Premios Juventud	Best Song For Love	"Me Soltaste"	Nominated	
