= Todo Depende de Ti =

Studio album by La Arrolladora Banda El Limón
- Released: July 27, 2010
- Genre: Banda
- Length: 38:12
- Label: Disa

La Arrolladora Banda El Limón chronology
Más Adelante (2009)	Todo Depende de Ti (2010)

Todo Depende de Ti (Everything Depends on You) is the title of a studio album released by banda music band La Arrolladora Banda El Limón on July 27, 2010. It is the follow-up to their number-one set on the Billboard Top Latin Albums chart Más Adelante.

== Track listing ==
The track listing from Allmusic.

No.	Title	Writer(s)	Length
1.	"Dos de Quince"	Oracio Ortiz	2:16
2.	"Disponible Para Mí"	Horacio Palencia	3:26
3.	"Cuánto Me Cuesta"	Milagros	3:02
4.	"Niña de Mi Corazón"	Palencia	3:08
5.	"Todo Depende de Tí"	Yoel Henriquez, Palencia	3:17
6.	"No Supe Cuidarte"	Palencia	3:20
7.	"Tu Historia Fue Conmigo"	Palencia	3:17
8.	"Volverte a Amar"	Mario Domm, Alejandra Guzmán	3:00
9.	"Ya No Te Buscaré"	Palencia	3:11
10.	"Yo Tuve la Culpa"	Palencia, José Luis Ortega	3:09
11.	"Siempre Estás Tú"	Palencia	3:57
12.	"El Diablo de Culiacán"	Mario Ibarra Castillo	3:09

== Charts ==
=== Weekly charts ===
Chart (2010)	Peak position
US Billboard 200	127
US Top Latin Albums (Billboard)	3
US Regional Mexican Albums (Billboard)	2

=== Year-end charts ===
Chart (2010)	Position
US Top Latin Albums (Billboard)	50

== Sales and certifications ==
Region	Certification	Certified units/sales
Mexico (AMPROFON)	2× Diamond+Platinum+Gold	690,000^{‡}
United States (RIAA)	Gold (Latin)	50,000^{^}
^{^} Shipments figures based on certification alone.^{‡} Sales+streaming figures based on certification alone.
