= Más Adelante =

Studio album by La Arrolladora Banda El Limón
- Released: March 24, 2009
- Genre: Banda
- Label: Disa

La Arrolladora Banda El Limón chronology
La Más Completa Colección... (2009)	Más Adelante (2009)	Todo Depende de Tí (2010)

Más Adelante (Ahead) is the title of a studio album released by the banda (music band) La Arrolladora Banda El Limón. This album became their first number-one set on the Billboard Top Latin Albums chart.

== Track listing ==
The track listing from Allmusic.

No.	Title	Writer(s)	Length
1.	"La Calabaza"	Jesús Omar Tarazón	3:24
2.	"Colgada a Mi Cuello"	Horacio Palencia	3:18
3.	"Ya Es Muy Tarde"	Palencia	3:03
4.	"Más Adelante"	Isidro Chávez	3:34
5.	"Carita de Perdón"	Chávez	3:06
6.	"Mañana en Tu Olvido"	Alberto Mercado	4:26
7.	"El Árbol de La Horca"	Paulino Vargas	3:19
8.	"Mi Error"	Tarazón	3:33
9.	"Te Estaré Esperando"	Palencia	4:06
10.	"Tu Risa"	Ricardo Valenzuela	3:41
11.	"La Balanza"	Teófilo Villa	2:54
12.	"Si Yo Te Contara"	Chávez	3:47
13.	"Como Pez en el Agua"	Palencia	3:04
14.	"Sabor al Caldo"	Tarazón	3:00
15.	"Como Perro Atropellado"	Villa	3:22

== Charts ==
=== Weekly charts ===
Chart (2009)	Peak position
US Billboard 200	66
US Top Latin Albums (Billboard)	1
US Regional Mexican Albums (Billboard)	1

=== Year-end charts ===
Chart (2009)	Position
US Top Latin Albums (Billboard)	23

== Sales and certifications ==
Region	Certification	Certified units/sales
Mexico (AMPROFON)	Platinum+Gold	120,000^{^}
^{^} Shipments figures based on certification alone.
