= Electricidad =

Studio album by Jesse & Joy
- Released: 15 September 2009
- Recorded: 2008 – 2009
- Genres: Latin pop, pop rock
- Length: 44:50 (standard edition); 54:20 (deluxe edition)
- Label: Warner Music México
- Producer: Thom Russo

Jesse & Joy chronology
| Esto Es lo Que Soy (2008) | Electricidad (2009) | ¿Con Quién Se Queda el Perro? (2011) |

Singles from Electricidad
- 1. "Adiós" Released: 20 July 2009; 2. "Electricidad" Released: 18 August 2009; 3. "Chocolate" Released: 24 November 2009; 4. "Si Te Vas" Released: 4 August 2010

Electricidad (English: Electricity) is the second studio album by Mexican duo Jesse & Joy. The album was released on 15 September 2009, by Warner Music México, and reached number twenty-one on the Mexican Albums Chart. The album was certified Gold by the Asociación Mexicana de Productores de Fonogramas y Videogramas (AMPROFON). "Adiós" became the album's lead single in July 2009. It peaked at number thirteen at the Hot Latin Songs chart and number three at Latin Pop Airplay chart. The title track was released the next month, and "Chocolate" was released as the third single. It peaked at number thirteen at the Mexican Airplay chart, as well as twenty-nine at the Latin Pop Airplay chart. "Si Te Vas" was released as the fourth and last single. Jesse & Joy promoted the album on a concert tour.

== Background ==
In an interview with Univision, Jesse commented "We're happy with how the album turned out, we're very satisfied with it, we've been experimenting for about eighteen months with sounds and everything and now here in the last five months we managed to assemble those parts in Los Angeles and from that came the single 'Adiós'".

== Track listing ==
All songs were written by Jesse and Joy Huerta.

| No. | Title | Length |
|---|---|---|
| 1. | "Electricidad" | 4:04 |
| 2. | "Adiós" | 4:09 |
| 3. | "Chocolate" | 4:08 |
| 4. | "Si Te Vas" | 3:54 |
| 5. | "Nuevo Día" | 4:46 |
| 6. | "Nada Es Mejor" | 3:16 |
| 7. | "Una Y Otra Vez" | 4:00 |
| 8. | "Invisible" | 3:39 |
| 9. | "Es Amor" | 4:21 |
| 10. | "Por Siempremente" | 4:17 |
| 11. | "Quédate" | 4:14 |
| 12. | "10 Mil Vidas" (Bonus Track)" | 3:11 |
| 13. | "Sublime" (Bonus Track)" | 2:35 |
| 14. | "Nunca Dije No" (Amazon Exclusive Bonus Track)" | 3:44 |
| 15. | "Mi Sol" (Brazilian Edition Bonus Track)" | 6:58 |
| 16. | "Dulce Melodía" (Brazilian Edition Bonus Track)" | 3:41 |

== Electricidad Tour ==
To promote the album, Jesse & Joy began the tour with a concert in the city of Houston, Texas on 25 September, also New York City's Webster Hall, along with Kinky on 30 September. Along with these dates, the tour has dates on Mexico, United States, Spain, Central America and South America.

== Credits and personnel ==
Credits adapted from Electricidad liner notes.

- Stevie Blacke – recording, string instruments
- Jon Button – bass guitar
- Randy Cooke – drums, percussion
- Matt Duane Griffin – production coordinator
- Jesse Huerta – composer, background vocals, guitar, bass guitar, piano
- Joy Huerta – composer, lead vocals
- Gavin Lurssen – mastering engineer
- Albert Mata – mastering engineer assistant
- Fernando Roldán – recording
- Thom Russo – arranger, hammond B3, keyboards, mix engineer, percussion, piano, producer, programming, recording, music director
- Maggie Wheeler – music director

== Charts ==
=== Album ===
The album debuted on the Mexican Albums Chart at number 55, and reached number 21 as its peak position.

| Chart | Peak position |
|---|---|
| Mexican Album Charts | 21 |
| US Billboard Latin Albums | 14 |
| US Billboard Latin Pop Albums | 3 |
| US Billboard Heatseekers | 22 |

=== Singles ===
| Year | Song | Mex (airplay) | U.S. Latin | U.S. Latin Pop |
|---|---|---|---|---|
| 2009 | "Electricidad" | — | — | — |
| 2009 | "Adiós" | — | 13 | 3 |
| 2010 | "Chocolate" | 13 | — | 29 |
| 2010 | "Si Te Vas" | — | — | — |

=== Year-end charts ===
| Single | Chart 2009 | Peak Position |
|---|---|---|
| Adiós | US Billboard Hot Latin Songs | 74 |

=== Certifications ===
| Region | Certification | Certified units/sales |
|---|---|---|
| Mexico (AMPROFON) | Gold | 30,000^{^} |
^{^} Shipments figures based on certification alone.
