= 13th Annual Latin Grammy Awards =

Music awards presented Nov 2012

13th Latin Grammy Awards
- Date: November 15, 2012
- Venue: Mandalay Bay Events Center, Paradise, Nevada
- Hosted by: Lucero and Cristián de la Fuente

Highlights
- Person of the Year: Caetano Veloso

Television/radio coverage
- Network: Univision

The 13th Annual Latin Grammy Awards was held on Thursday, November 15, 2012 at the Mandalay Bay Events Center in Las Vegas. It was the fifth time the awards was held at this venue and in Las Vegas. It also marks the last year in the Latin Recording Academy's contract where the Mandalay Bay Events Center hosted. It is unknown if the awards will continue to be held at this location beyond 2012.

Recordings must have been released between July 1, 2011 and June 30, 2012 in order to be eligible for the 13th Latin Grammy Awards. Nominations were announced on September 25, 2012. Juan Luis Guerra led the nominations field with six; Jesse & Joy earned five nods; Ricardo Arjona, Edgar Barrera, Juanes, Carla Morrison, Arturo Sandoval, Ivete Sangalo, and Caetano Veloso each received four nominations. The telecast was aired on Univision at 8pm/7c. Caetano Veloso was honored as the Latin Recording Academy Person of the Year on November 14, 2012.

Jesse & Joy won four awards including Record of the Year and Song of the Year for "¡Corre!", Juanes took the Album of the Year for MTV Unplugged and 3BallMTY was named Best New Artist.

== Changes to award categories ==
On May 10, 2012 the Latin Recording Academy announced that The Academy's Trustees approved changes in the general and pop fields and expanded the Rock and Tropical fields, bringing the total number of categories from 46 to 47:

- Each of the four categories in the general field (Album of the Year, Record of the Year, Song of the Year and Best New Artist) will now include 10 nominees.
- The Pop Field: The three categories (Best Female Pop Vocal Album, Best Male Pop Vocal Album and Best Pop Album by a Duo or Group with Vocals) will now be combined in two new categories: Best Contemporary Pop Vocal Album and Best Traditional Pop Vocal Album.
- The Rock Field: A new category, called Best Pop/Rock Album, was added.
- The Tropical Field: A new category, called Best Tropical Fusion Album, was added.
- The Alternative Field: Both categories (Best Alternative Music Album and Best Alternative Song) will now accept recordings in the Portuguese language.
- The Brazilian field: The category Best Native Brazilian Roots Album is now called Best Brazilian Roots Album.

== Awards ==
The following is a list of nominees:

Bold indicates winner.

=== General ===
Record of the Year

Jesse & Joy — "¡Corre!"

- Ricardo Arjona and Gaby Moreno — "Fuiste Tú"
- ChocQuibTown featuring Tego Calderón and Zully Murillo — "Calentura"
- Kany García — "Que Te Vaya Mal"
- Juan Luis Guerra — "En El Cielo No Hay Hospital"
- Juanes featuring Joaquín Sabina — "Azul Sabina"
- Maná — "Hasta Que Te Conocí"
- Ivete Sangalo — "Atrás da Porta"
- Alejandro Sanz — "No Me Compares"
- Zoé — "Bésame Mucho"

Album of the Year

Juanes — Juanes MTV Unplugged

- Ricardo Arjona — Independiente
- Bebe — Un Pokito de Rocanrol
- Chico Buarque — Chico
- ChocQuibTown — Eso Es Lo Que Hay
- Jesse & Joy — ¿Con Quién Se Queda El Perro?
- Carla Morrison — Déjenme Llorar
- Reik — Peligro
- Arturo Sandoval — Dear Diz (Every Day I Think of You)
- Caetano Veloso, Gilberto Gil and Ivete Sangalo — Especial Ivete, Gil E Caetano

Song of the Year

Jesse & Joy and Tommy Torres — "¡Corre!" (Jesse & Joy)

- Juan Luis Guerra, Juanes and Joaquín Sabina — "Azul Sabina" (Juanes featuring Joaquín Sabina)
- Kiko Cibrián, Gilberto Marín, Julio Ramírez and Mónica Vélez — "Creo en Ti" (Reik)
- Carla Morrison — "Déjenme Llorar"
- Juan Luis Guerra — "En El Cielo No Hay Hospital"
- Jose Luis Latorre, Antonio Orozco and Xavi Pérez — "Estoy Hecho de Pedacitos de Ti" (Antonio Orozco featuring Alejandro Fernández)
- Ricardo Arjona — "Fuiste Tú" (Ricardo Arjona and Gaby Moreno)
- Amaury Gutiérrez and Gian Marco — "Invisible" (Gian Marco)
- Alejandro Sanz — "No Me Compares"

Best New Artist

3Ball MTY

- Gaby Amarantos
- Deborah del Corral
- Elaín
- Ulises Hadjis
- Los Mesoneros
- Juan Magan
- Rosario Ortega
- Piso 21
- Ana Victoria

=== Pop ===
Best Contemporary Pop Album

Jesse & Joy — ¿Con Quién Se Queda El Perro?

- Pablo Alborán — En Acústico
- Chambao — Chambao
- Beatriz Luengo — Bela y Sus Moskitas Muertas
- Pamela Rodriguez — Reconocer

Best Traditional Pop Album

David Bisbal — Una Noche en el Teatro Real

- Pepe Aguilar — Negociaré con la pena
- Sergio Dalma — Vía Dalma II
- Presuntos Implicados — Banda Sonora
- Pasión Vega — Sin Compasión

=== Urban ===
Best Urban Music Album

Don Omar — Don Omar Presents MTO²: New Generation

- J Alvarez — Otro Nivel de Música Reloaded
- Tego Calderón — The Original Gallo del País
- Farruko — The Most Powerful Rookie
- Ana Tijoux — La Bala

Best Urban Song

Don Omar — "Hasta Que Salga el Sol"

- Max Deniro, Sak Noel, Pitbull, William Reyna and DJ Buddha — "Crazy People" (Sensato featuring Pitbull and Sak Noel)
- Don Omar and Milton "Alcover" Restituyo — "Dutty Love" (Don Omar featuring Natti Natasha)
- Alexis & Fido — "Energía"
- Daddy Yankee — "Lovumba"

=== Rock ===
Best Rock Album

Molotov — Desde Rusia Con Amor

- Los Mesoneros — Indeleble
- No Te Va Gustar — Público
- San Pascualito — Valiente
- Viniloversus — Cambié de Nombre

Best Pop/Rock Album

El Cuarteto de Nos — Porfiado

- Jotdog — Turista de Amor
- Leiva — Diciembre
- Los Claxons — Camino A Encontrarte
- Vega — La Cuenta Atrás

Best Rock Song

Roberto Musso — "Cuando Sea Grande" (El Cuarteto de Nos)

- Manuel Diquez — "Anti Idolo"
- Leo Felipe Campos and Ulises Hadjis — "Dónde Va" (Ulises Hadjis)
- Doctor Krápula — "Exigimos"
- Luis Jiménez — "Indeleble" (Los Mesoneros)

=== Alternative ===
Best Alternative Music Album

Carla Morrison — Déjenme Llorar

- Lisandro Aristimuño — Mundo Anfibio
- ChocQuibTown — Eso Es Lo Que Hay
- Ulises Hadjis — Cosas Perdidas
- Kinky — Sueño de la Máquina

Best Alternative Song

Carla Morrison — "Déjenme Llorar"

- Bebe — "Mi Guapo"
- Juan Campodónico and Jorge Drexler — "1987" (Campo)
- John King, Kinky and Mala Rodríguez — "Negro Día" (Kinky)
- Caetano Veloso — "Neguinho" (Gal Costa)

=== Tropical ===
Best Salsa Album

Luis Enrique — Soy y Seré

- Rubén Blades and Cheo Feliciano — Eba Say Ajá
- Mambo Legend Orchestra — Watch Out! Ten Cuidao!
- Víctor Manuelle — Busco un Pueblo
- Tito Nieves — Mi Última Grabación

Best Cumbia/Vallenato Album

Juan Piña — Le Canta A San Jacinto

- Jorge Celedón and Jimmy Zambrano — Lo Que Tú Necesitas
- Silvestre Dangond and Juancho De la Espriella — No Me Compares Con Nadie
- Diomedes Díaz and Álvaro López — Con Mucho Gusto Caray
- Omar Geles — Histórico - A Duo Con Los Grandes

Best Contemporary Tropical Album

Milly Quezada — Aquí Estoy Yo

- Elain — Volando Alto - Made on the Road
- Juan Formell and Los Van Van — La Maquinaria
- Gaitanes — Caminos
- Maía — Instinto

Best Traditional Tropical Album

Eliades Ochoa — Un Bolero Para Tí

- Miguel García — Guarachando
- Plenealo — Soy Yo
- Quinteto Criollo — La Trova de Siempre
- Son de Tikiza — Bolero

Best Tropical Fusion Album

Fonseca — Ilusión+

- Caseroloops — Afronauta
- Sergent Garcia — Una y Otra Vez
- Juan Magan — The King of Dance
- Prince Royce — Phase II

Best Tropical Song

Yoel Henríquez and Alex Puentes — "Toma Mi Vida" (Milly Quezada featuring Juan Luis Guerra)

- Tamela — "¡Acércate!" (Tamela featuring Son de Tikizia)
- Alejandro Bassi and Fonseca — "Desde Que No Estás" (Fonseca)
- Chino & Nacho and Pablo Villalobos — "El Poeta" (Chino & Nacho)
- Yoel Henríquez, Horacio Palencia and Jorge Luis Piloto — "Eres Linda" (Tito Nieves)

=== Singer-Song Writer ===
Best Singer-Song Writer Album

Gian Marco — 20 Años

- Ricardo Arjona — Independiente
- Chico Buarque — Chico
- José Luis Perales — Calle Soledad
- Rosana — ¡¡Buenos Dias, Mundo!!

=== Regional Mexican ===
Best Ranchero Album

Pepe Aguilar — Mas de Un Camino

- Shaila Dúrcal — Así
- Pedro Fernández — No Que No...
- Miguel y Miguel — Aquí En El Rancho
- Trio Ellas — Trio Ellas

Best Banda Album

La Arrolladora Banda El Limón — Irreversible... 2012

- Cristina — Golpes de Pecho
- La Adictiva Banda San José de Mesillas — Nada Iguales
- Fidel Rueda — Sinaloense Hasta Las Cachas
- Beto Zapata — Prisionero de tus Brazos

Best Tejano Album

Joe Posada — Algo Esta Pasando

- Avizo — Mas Amigos
- Los Desperadoz — Sunset Run
- Los Hermanos Farías — Back On Track
- Jay Perez — The Voice of Authority

Best Norteño Album

Los Tucanes de Tijuana — 365 Días

- Regulo Caro — Amor En Tiempos de Guerra
- Duelo — Vuela Muy Alto
- Implakable — Simplemente
- Gerardo Ortíz — Entre Dios Y El Diablo
- Siggno — Lo Que Me Dejaste

Best Regional Mexican Song

Luis Carlos Monroy and Adrian Pieragostino — "El Mejor Perfume" (La Original Banda El Limón de Salvador Lizárraga)

- Ismael Gallegos and Alberto "Beto" Jimenez Maeda — "Ay Mi México" (Mariachi Divas de Cindy Shea)
- Charlie Corona and Jesse Turner — "Como Me Acuerdo de Ti" (Siggno)
- Luis Carlos Monroy and Adrian Pieragostino — "El Día Que Me Fuí" (Shaila Dúrcal)
- Manuel Eduardo Toscano — "Vivo Contenta" (Paquita la del Barrio)

=== Instrumental ===
Best Instrumental Album

Chick Corea, Eddie Gómez and Paul Motian — Further Explorations

- Paquito D'Rivera and Berta Rojas — Día y Medio
- Guinga + Quinteto Villa-Lobos — Rasgando Seda
- Hamilton de Holanda — Brasilianos 3
- Miguel Zenón — Alma Adentro: The Puerto Rican Songbook

=== Traditional ===
Best Folk Album

Lila Downs — Pecados y Milagros

- Reynaldo Armas — Me Emborrache Pa' Olvidarla
- Eva Ayllón + Inti-Illimani — Eva Ayllón + Inti-Illimani Histórico
- Luciano Pereyra — Con Alma de Pueblo
- Chuchito Valdés and Eddy Navia — Piano y Charango

Best Tango Album

Arturo Sandoval — Tango Como Yo Te Siento

- Carlos Bosio — El Tango Lo Siento Así
- Cuartetango String Quartet — Masters of Bandoneon
- Susana Rinaldi — Experimentango
- Tango VIP — Grandes Varones del Tango

Best Flamenco Album

Paco de Lucía — En Vivo Conciertos España 2010

- Antonio Cortés — Cuando Quieras
- Niño Josele — El Mar de Mi Ventana
- Diana Navarro — Flamenco
- Various Artists — México Flamenco

=== Jazz ===
Best Latin Jazz Album

Arturo Sandoval — Dear Diz (Every Day I Think of You)

- Jerry Gonzalez and El Comando de la Clave — Jerry González and El Comando de la Clave
- Tania Maria — Tempo
- Poncho Sanchez and Terence Blanchard — Chano y Dizzy!
- Chuchito Valdes — Live in Chicago

=== Christian ===
Best Christian Album (Spanish Language)

Marcos Witt — 25 Concierto Conmemorativo

- Paulina Aguirre — Rompe El Silencio
- Carlos Carcache — Aquí En Tu Presencia
- Generasion — Yo Soy Generasion
- Jacobo Ramos — Dile Al Corazón Que Camine
- Tercer Cielo — Lo Que El Viento Me Enseñó

Best Christian Album (Portuguese Language)

Aline Barros — Aline Barros & Cia 3

- Paulo César Baruk e Banda Salluz — Eletro Acústico 3
- Cantores de Deus — Mulheres Ao Vivo
- Grupo Chamas — Inquieto Coraçao
- Ministério de Louvor Diante do Trono — Diante do Trono 14 - Sol da Justiça

=== Brazilian ===
Best Brazilian Contemporary Pop Album

Seu Jorge — Músicas Para Churrascos Vol. 1

- Céu — Caravana Sereia Bloom
- Zeila Duncan — Pelo Sabor do Gesto em Cena
- Rita Lee — Reza
- Mart'nália — Não Tente Comprender

Best Brazilian Rock Album

Beto Lee — Celebração & Sacrificío

- CPM 22 — Depois de Um Longo Inverno
- Ira! e Ultraje A Rigor — Ao Vivo no Rock in Rio
- NX Zero — Multishow ao Vivo NX Zero 10 Anos
- RPM — Elektra

Best Samba/Pagode Album

Beth Carvalho — Nosso Samba Tá na Rua
Emilio Santiago — So Danço Samba ao Vivo

- Alcione — Duas Faces ao Vivo na Mangueira
- Sorriso Maroto — 15 Anos ao Vivo
- Thiaguinho — Ousadia & Alegria

Best MPB Album

Caetano Veloso, Gilberto Gil and Ivete Sangalo — Especial Ivete, Gil e Caetano

- Maria Bethânia — Oásis de Bethânia
- João Bosco — 40 Anos Depois
- Ivan Lins — Amorágio
- Marisa Monte — O Que Você Quer Saber de Verdade
- Leila Pinheiro — Raiz
- Maria Rita — Elo

Best Sertaneja Music Album

Chitãozinho & Xororó — Chitãozinho & Xororó - 40 Anos - Sinfônico

- Daniel — Pra Ser Feliz
- Fernando & Sorocaba — Acústico na Ópera de Arame
- Paula Fernandes — Meus Encantos
- Luan Santana — Quando Chega a Noite
- Michel Teló — Michel na Balada
- Victor e Leo — Amor de Alma

Best Brazilian Roots Album

Dominguinhos — Iluminado

- Gaby Amarantos — Treme
- Oswaldinho ao Accordion — Forró Chorado
- Jammil — Jammil na Real
- Daniela Mercury — Canibália - Ritmos do Brasil (Ao Vivo)

Best Brazilian Song

Chico Buarque — "Querido Diário"

- Pretinho da Serrinha, Leandro Fab and Seu Jorge — "A Doida" (Seu Jorge)
- Antonio Dyggs and Sharon Axé Moi — "Ai Se Eu Te Pego" (Michel Teló)
- Arnaldo Antunes and Marisa Monte — "Ainda Bem" (Marisa Monte)
- Lenine and Ivan Santos — "Amor é Pra Quem Ama" (Lenine)

=== Children's ===
Best Latin Children's Album

María Teresa Chacín — María Teresa Chacín Canta Cuentos

- Miguelito — Tiempo de Navidad
- Rita Rosa y Amigos — Canciones de Agua
- Various Artists — Disney's Los Muppets Banda Sonora Original de Walt Disney Records
- Xuxa — Xuxa só para Baixinhos 11 - Sustentabilidade

=== Classical ===
Best Classical Album

Cuarteto Latinoamericano — Brasileiro: Works of Francisco Mignone

- Guillermo Figueroa, I Solisti di Zagreb and Pepe Romero — Cordero: Caribbean Concertos For Guitar and For Violin
- Javier Perianes and Josep Pons — Da Falla: Noches En Los Jardines de España
- José Serebrier — Dvorak Symphony No. 7; In Nature's Realm, Scherzo Capriccioso
- Gabriel Castagna — Fiesta Criolla: Latin-American Orchestral Works
- Quarteto Radamés Gnattali — Prelúdio 21: Quartetos das Ordas

Best Classical Contemporary Composition

Yalil Guerra — "Seducción" (Elizabeth Rebozo)

- Tania León — "Inura"
- Gustavo Casenave — "Miñoqui"
- Aurelio de la Vega — "Preludio No. 1" (Elizabeth Rebozo)
- Leo Brouwer — "Quartet No. 4 - Rem Tene Verba Sequentur (Know the Matter and the Word Will Follow)" (Havana String Quartet)
- Tim Rescala — "Quarteto Circular"
- Carlos Franzetti — "Stringazo" (Cuartetango String Quartet)

=== Recording Package ===
Best Recording Package

Miguel Masa — Cambié de Nombre (Viniloversus)

- MZK — Bixinga 70 (Bixiga70)
- Alejandro Ros — Canciones Para Aliens (Fito Páez)
- Pablo Martínez — Indeleble (Los Mesoneros)
- Mago — Ves Lo Que Quieres Ver (Bareto)

=== Production ===
Best Engineered Album

Gregg Field, Don Murray and Paul Blakemore — Dear Diz (Every Day I Think of You) (Arturo Sandoval)

- Madre Música and André Dias — Brasilianos 3 (Hamilton de Holanda)
- Bruno Giorgi and Carlos Freitas — Chão (Lenine)
- Julio Boscher, Walter Costa, Duda Mello, Leonel Pereda, Carlos Toré and Ricardo Garcia — Liebe Paradiso (Celso Fonseca e Ronaldo Bastos)
- Alexandre Gaiotto — O Canto da Sereia (Regina Benedetti)

Producer of the Year

Juan Luis Guerra

- Moogie Canazio
- Gregg Field
- Sergio George
- Martin Terefe

=== Music video ===
Best Short Form Music Video

Jesse & Joy — "Me Voy"

- Catupecu Machu — "Metrópolis Nueva"
- Georgina — "Rara"
- Nevilton — "Tempos de Maracujá"
- Rakel — "En El Tiempo"

Best Long Form Music Video

Juanes — Juanes MTV Unplugged

- Enrique Bunbury — Licenciado Cantinas, The Movie
- Manuel Galbán — Blue Cha Cha
- Shakira — Live from Paris
- Caetano Veloso, Gilberto Gil and Ivete Sangalo — Especial Ivete, Gilberto e Caetano

=== Special awards ===
Lifetime Achievement Award

- Luz Casal
- Leo Dan
- Rita Moreno
- Milton Nascimento
- Daniela Romo
- Poncho Sanchez
- Toquinho

Trustees Award

- Juan Carmona Habichuela
- Yomo Toro

Person of the Year

- Caetano Veloso

== Performers ==
- 01. — Intro — "Latin Grammy 2012" — 00:52
- 02. — Pitbull — "Don't Stop The Party" — 03:16
- 03. — Pedro Fernández — "No Que No" — 02:54
- 04. — Pablo Alborán — "Perdóname" — 03:06
- 05. — Juanes Featuring Carlos Santana — "Fíjate Bien" — 03:47
- 06. Joan Sebastian — "Diséñame" 03:20
- 07. — 3Ball MTY, Featuring El Bebeto, América Sierra And SkyBlu — "Inténtalo (Me Prende)" — 03:49
- 08. — Alejandro Sanz — "No Me Compares" — 04:37
- 09. — Michel Teló And Blue Man Group — "Ai Se Eu Te Pego" — 03:21
- 10. — Jesse & Joy — "¡Corre!" 03:46
- 11. — Juan Luis Guerra 440 — "En El Cielo No Hay Hospital" — 02:52
- 12. — Shaila Dúrcal With Mariachi Reyna De Los Angeles — "El Día Que Me Fui" — 03:31
- 13. — David Bisbal — "Lloraré Las Penas" — 02:51
- 14. — Lila Downs, Celso Piña And Totó La Momposina — "Zapata Se Queda" — 03:59
- 15. — Prince Royce Featuring Joan Sebastian — "Incondicional" — 02:49
- 16. — Víctor Manuelle — "Si Tú Me Besas" — 03:14
- 17. — Gerardo Ortíz — "Aquiles Afirmo" — 03:15
- 18. — Kany García — "Alguien" — 03:07
- 19. — Daniela Romo And Sergio Dalma — "Yo No Te Pido La Luna" — 03:37
- 20. — Juan Magan — "Se Vuelve Loca / No Sigue Modas" — 03:12
- 21. — Caetano Veloso And Arturo Sandoval — "Capullito De Alelí" — 03:38
- 22. — Sensato Featuring Pitbull and Sak Noel — "Crazy People" — 03:31

== Presenters ==
- Jaime Camil and Ninel Conde — presented Record of the Year
- Deborah del Corral and Chino & Nacho — presented Best Traditional Pop Album
- Reik — presented Best Contemporary Tropical Album
- Galilea Montijo and Sebastián Rulli — presented Best Tropical Fusion Album
- Marcelo Córdoba and Ana Victoria — presented Best Norteño Album
- ChocQuibTown — Best New Artist
- Nelly Furtado and Mark Tacher — presented Song of the Year
- Zuria Vega and Gabriel Soto — presented Best Long Form Music Video
- Anita Tijoux and Fonseca — Best Contemporary Pop Album
- Antonio Orozco and Milly Quezada — presented Best Ranchero Album
- Lucero and Cristián de la Fuente (hosts) — announced Person of the Year C
- Ana Brenda Contreras and Tommy Torres — presented Best Alternative Music Album
- Natalie Cole and Pepe Aguilar — presented Album of the Year
