= La de la Mala Suerte =

2012 single by Jesse & Joy

"La De La Mala Suerte"

Single by Jesse & Joy

from the album ¿Con Quién Se Queda El Perro?
- B-side: "¡Corre!"
- Released: 13 March 2012
- Recorded: 2011
- Genre: Latin
- Length: 4:11
- Label: Warner Music
- Songwriters: Jesse Huerta, Joy Huerta

Jesse & Joy singles chronology
| "¡Corre!" (2011) | "La De La Mala Suerte" (2012) | "¿Con Quién Se Queda El Perro?" (2012) |

"La De La Mala Suerte" (English: "The Unlucky One") is a pop song written by Mexican pop duo Jesse & Joy. The song is included on their third studio album, ¿Con Quién Se Queda El Perro? (2011), and was released as the third single from the album on 13 March 2012.

== Trackslisting ==
Digital Download
| No. | Title | Length |
|---|---|---|
| 1. | "La De La Mala Suerte" | 4:11 |
| 2. | "¡Corre!" (B-side) | 4:34 |

== Charts (Original version) ==
| Chart (2012) | Peak position |
|---|---|
| Honduras (Honduras Top 50) | 8 |
| Mexico (Billboard Mexican Airplay) | 1 |
| Mexico (Monitor Latino) | 1 |
| US Hot Latin Songs (Billboard) | 23 |
| US Latin Pop Airplay (Billboard) | 6 |

== Pablo Alborán version ==
"La de la Mala Suerte"

Single by Jesse & Joy featuring Pablo Alborán
- Released: 21 June 2013
- Length: 4:08
- Label: Warner Music Mexico
- Songwriters: Jesse Huerta, Joy Huerta

Jesse & Joy singles chronology
| "Me Quiero Enamorar" (2013) | "La de la Mala Suerte" (2013) | "Ecos de Amor" (2015) |

Pablo Alborán singles chronology
| "Quién" (2013) | "La de la Mala Suerte" (2013) | "Éxtasis" (2013) |

The song was re-released featuring Spanish singer-song writer Pablo Alborán. It was first played on 14 May 2013 and released digitally on 21 June 2013. The song peaked at number 17 on the Spanish singles chart in December 2013.

=== Charts (Duet version) ===
| Chart (2013) | Peak position |
|---|---|
| Spain (PROMUSICAE) | 17 |

== Release history ==
Digital releases
| Country | Version | Date | Format | Label |
|---|---|---|---|---|
| Mexico | Solo version | 13 March 2012 | Mainstream radio | Warner Music |
| Mexico | with Pablo Alborán | 22 June 2013 | iTunes | Warner Music |

== See also ==
- List of number-one songs of 2012 (Mexico)
