= Me Voy (Jesse & Joy song) =

Single by Jesse & Joy

from the album ¿Con Quién Se Queda El Perro?
- Released: 2 September 2011
- Recorded: 2011; Kensaltown Recording Studios (London)
- Genre: Latin music
- Length: 3:27
- Label: Warner Music Mexico
- Songwriters: Jesse Huerta, Joy Huerta
- Producer: Martin Terefe

Jesse & Joy singles chronology
"Si Te Vas" (2010)	"Me Voy" (2011)	"¡Corre!" (2011)

"Me Voy" (English: "I Am Leaving") is a song performed by Mexican recording artists Jesse & Joy, from their third studio album ¿Con Quién Se Queda El Perro? (2011). The song was written by Jesse and Joy Huerta and was released as the lead single from the album on 2 September 2011. "Me Voy" peaked on the Billboard Latin Pop Songs at thirty for the week of 24 December 2011.

The accompanying music video for "Me Voy" was released on 5 September 2011 and was directed by Carlos López Estrada, a previous collaborator with Jesse & Joy. (Animation by Cameron Clark, Production Design and Art Direction by Tyler Jensen.) The video features the band performing the song, through an assortment of scenes using a stop motion technique. After its release, the video was met with positive reception and won the Best Short Form Music Video at the 13th Annual Latin Grammy Awards.

== Background ==
"Me Voy" was written by Jesse and Joy Huerta and produced by Martin Terefe. The song was recorded in London in 2011, along with the rest of the tracks for their third studio album ¿Con Quién Se Queda El Perro?. The track was released as the lead single from the album on 2 September 2011. At the time of its release, Joy was working as a musical advisor to Aleks Syntek, a judge on La Voz... México, a reality show and singing competition based on the format of The Voice.

== Lyrics and reception ==
All the lyrics included on the album deal with the band members' personal experiences. "Me Voy" is a song about a broken heart and how you recover from that situation, feeling better and stronger when the relationship is over. Commenting on the songs included on the album, Jesse said: "[our] maturity can be heard in the lyrics, we made it as tangible, more real, more raw than ever, more visceral yet romantic, melancholic and proactive." Jon O'Brien of Allmusic described the song as "melodic Latin rock".

== Music video ==
The music video for "Me Voy" was directed by Carlos López Estrada and produced by Christian Heuer. López also directed "Chocolate", the third single from their previous album. The video uses the stop motion technique, and the production team trimmed 2900 photographs in order to create the sequences included.

The official music video is set in the 1920s. It begins with a night skyline and Joy being driven by a chauffeur to the Teatro Concordia, where a magic performance is going to take place. The magician, played by Jesse, hides a rabbit in his hat, astonishing the audience. Then, he asks Joy to go to the stage and requests her to go inside a magic box, and Jesse disappears her. As the show ends, backstage assistants discover Jesse did not return Joy back, and she makes the headlines. Jesse concerned about this, goes inside the magic box and arrives to the bottom of a sea. There he fights a sea serpent, but fails to defeat it and he is eaten. Inside, he finds Joy, who is tied to a chair, and the rabbit. To escape, he kills the sea serpent using his magic powers by penetrating its stomach and they are "ejected" from its body. They go out the box and arrive to a field, where Jesse takes out the rabbit from his back, Joy looks delighted and the rabbit winks its eye as the music video ends. Throughout the video, Jesse & Joy, with their accomplishment band, appear playing their instruments. An alternate music video was included in the deluxe edition of ¿Con Quién Se Queda El Perro?. It is titled "Me Voy / Movie version", and it does not include images of the band performing.

On the review for the music video, the website VideoStatic commented: "cut-out pieces of paper get layered into an immersive 3-D stop-motion video that's got an old-timey, yet fantastical vibe." The video earned the Best Short Form Music Video at the 13th Annual Latin Grammy Awards.

== Trackslisting ==
Digital download
No.	Title	Length
1.	"Me Voy"	3:27

== Credits and personnel ==
Credits adapted from the deluxe edition of ¿Con Quién Se Queda El Perro?.

- Ainsley Adams: recorder
- Jesse Huerta: lyrics and music
- Joy Huerta: lyrics, music, vocals
- Nikolaj Torp Larsen: Hammond organ, Wurlitzer and piano
- Andreas Olsson: keyboards and programming
- Kristoffer Sonn: drums and percussions
- Martin Terefe: record producer, guitars, bass guitar and choir

== Charts performance ==
"Me Voy" debuted at number 40 in the Billboard Latin Pop Songs in the United States the week of 10 December 2011. The song peaked at number 30 two weeks later.

Chart (2011)	Peak position
Mexico (Billboard Mexican Airplay)	7
Mexico (Monitor Latino)	8
US Latin Pop Airplay (Billboard)	30

== Release history ==
Region	Date	Format
United States	2 September 2011	Digital download
Mexico	2 September 2011	Digital download
