= ¡Corre! =

Single by Jesse & Joy

from the album ¿Con Quién Se Queda El Perro?
- Released: October 4, 2011
- Recorded: 2011
- Genre: Latin; pop
- Length: 4:48
- Label: Warner
- Songwriters: Jesse Huerta; Joy Huerta; Tommy Torres
- Producer: Martín Terefe

Jesse & Joy singles chronology
"Me Voy" (2011)	"¡Corre!" (2011)	"La De La Mala Suerte" (2012)

¡Corre! (English: "Run!") is a pop song written by Mexican duo Jesse & Joy. The song is included on their third studio album, ¿Con Quién Se Queda El Perro? (2011), and was released as the second single on October 4, 2011. The track won Song of the Year and Record of the Year at the 13th Annual Latin Grammy Awards. The song was later translated to English and released as "Run".

== Track listing ==
Digital download
No.	Title	Length
1.	"¡Corre!"	4:49

Bachata version
No.	Title	Length
1.	"¡Corre!" (featuring La Republika)	3:59

== Chart performance ==
The song debuted at No. 27 on the Latin Pop Songs chart, the week ending February 4, 2012. The following week it jumped to No. 21. The song broke the top 20 on its third week, reaching No. 18, and on its fourth week it reached No. 13. On its fifth week, the song rose to No. 8, and in its ninth week on the chart, it jumped to No. 3, becoming the duo's first song to do so. On the week ending March 31, 2012, and after two weeks at No. 5, the song jumped to No. 1, becoming the first single from the duo to reach the top. The song became a huge commercial hit in Mexico, reaching number-one position and staying there for fourteen weeks.

=== Charts ===
Chart (2012)	Peak position
Mexico (Billboard Mexican Airplay)	1
Mexico (Monitor Latino)	1
US Hot Latin Songs (Billboard)	8
US Latin Pop Airplay (Billboard)	1
US Tropical Airplay (Billboard)	34
Chart (2013)	Peak position
Spain (PROMUSICAE)	16
Spain (Spanish Airplay Chart)	21

End Of Year (2013)	Peak position
Spain (PROMUSICAE)	50

==== Other versions ====
Bachata featuring La Republika

Chart (2012)	Peak position
US Hot Latin Songs (Billboard)	4
US Latin Pop Airplay (Billboard)	1
US Tropical Airplay (Billboard)	1

== Release history ==
Digital releases
Country	Date	Format	Label	Version
Worldwide	October 4, 2011	Mainstream radio	Warner	Standard version
Worldwide	December 12, 2011	Music video	Warner	Standard version
United States	April 24, 2012	Digital download	Warner	Bachata version
Canada	April 24, 2012	Digital download	Warner	Bachata version

== Sales ==
Region	Certification	Certified units/sales
Mexico Digital downloads	—	30,000

== See also ==
- List of number-one songs of 2012 (Mexico)
