= La Arrolladora Banda El Limón =

Mexican music group

La Arrolladora Banda El Limón de René Camacho, or simply La Arrolladora, is a Mexican banda from Mazatlán, Sinaloa. In 1997 they signed with Sony Music Latin. In 2003, they switched labels and signed with Disa Records.

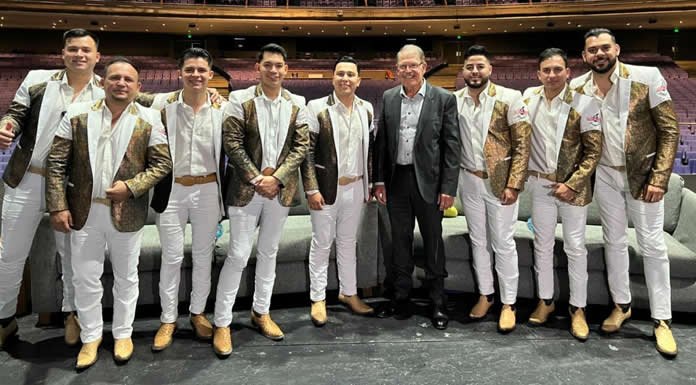
La Arrolladora Banda El Limón in 2022.

== History ==
Banda El Limón was formed in 1965 in El Limón de los Peraza, Sinaloa, by Pedro Aramburo, Encarnación Peraza, Lino Quintero, Carlos Peraza and Pedro Peraza. The banda began performing in the port of Mazatlán, and in 1976, Salvador Lizárraga assumed the direction of the banda.

In 1997, internal conflicts arose in the banda, as René Camacho assumed the temporary direction while Salvador Lizárraga was recovering from a stroke. The disputes between Camacho and Lizárraga led to the division of the banda in two: René Camacho recruited many members of the Banda and founded La Arrolladora Banda El Limón, while the members who remained with Lizárraga continued performing as La Original Banda El Limón. Since both bandas are very popular, often with the same crowd, René Camacho's banda is referred to simply as "La Arrolladora" to avoid confusion.

== Discography ==
=== Studio albums ===
- Sony Music Latin (After relaunched by La Sierra Records)
  - Se Me Cansó El Corazón (1997) (First album)
  - Corridos Arrolladores (1997)
  - Antes de Partir (1998)
  - Secretos de mi Memoria (1999)
  - Era cabron el viejo (2000)
  - simplemente...Arrolladora (2000)
  - Pa' Adoloridos (2001)
  - Valió la pena equivocarme (2001)
  - Grandes Boleros Arrolladores Homenaje a la Internacional Sonora Santanera (2002)
  - Mas allá de mí (2003) (Last album on Sony)

- Disa Records
  - Grandes Boleros Arrolladores Homenaje a la Internacional Sonora Santanera (2002) (Reissue on Disa)
  - Se Me Acabó El Amor (2003) (Reissue of "Más Allá De Mí")
  - Huele a Peligro (2004) (First album officially on Disa)
  - La Otra Cara De La Moneda (2006)
  - Y Que Quede Claro (2007)
  - Más Adelante (2009)
  - Todo Depende de Ti (2010)
  - Irreversible...2012 (2012)
  - Gracias Por Creer (2013)
  - Ojos en Blanco (2015)
  - Libre Otra Vez (2016)
  - Calidad Y Cantidad (2018)
  - Labios Mentirosos (2019)
  - En Contra De Mi Voluntad (2021)
  - Prefiero Estar Contigo (2022)
  - Prefiero Estar Contigo (Deluxe) (2022)
  - Aquí Hay Para Llevar
  - Si Las Miradas Mataran (2026)
  - Si Las Miradas Mataran (Deluxe) (2026)

=== Live albums ===
- En Vivo Desde Culiacán, Sinaloa (2004)
- Para Ti Exclusivo Desde Arandas, Jalisco (2007)
- Sold Out Desde Los Ángeles, California (2009)
- En Vivo Desde el Coloso de Reforma (2014)

=== Compilations ===
- Éxitos Arrolladores (2004)
- Los Super Éxitos (2006)
- Las Número 1 (2007)
- Lo Esencial de la Arrolladora Banda El Limón (2009)
- Corridos Arrolladores 2 (2010)

== Awards and nominations ==
=== Latin Grammy Awards ===
Year	Nominee / work	Award	Result
2011	Todo Depende De Tí	Best Banda Album	Won

=== Lo Nuestro Awards ===
Year	Nominee / work	Award	Result
2011	Todo Depende De Tí	Best Banda Album	Won
2013	La Arrolladora Banda El Limón de René Camacho	Artist of the Year	Nominated
2013	La Arrolladora Banda El Limón de René Camacho	Regional Mexican Group	Won
2013	La Arrolladora Banda El Limón de René Camacho	Banda Artist of the Year	Nominated
2013	Irreversible... 2012	Regional Mexican Album	Nominated
2013	"Llamada De Mi Ex"	Regional Mexican Song	Nominated
2014	La Arrolladora Banda El Limón de René Camacho	Regional Mexican Group	Nominated
2014	La Arrolladora Banda El Limón de René Camacho	Banda Artist	Nominated
2015	La Arrolladora Banda El Limón de René Camacho	Banda Artist of the Year	Won
