= Jesse & Joy =

Mexican pop duo

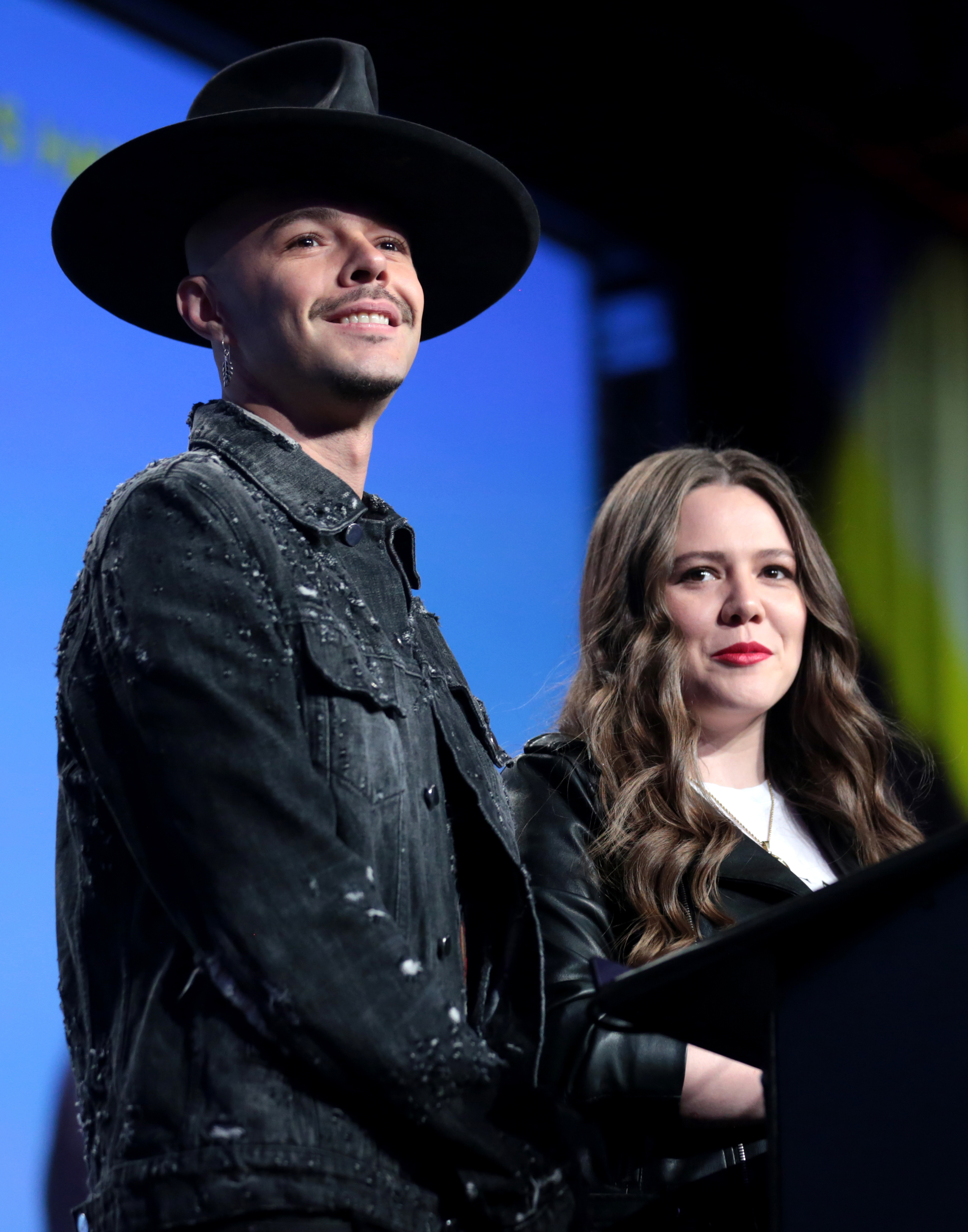
- Jesse (left) and Joy (right) in 2017

Background information
- Origin: Mexico City, Mexico
- Genres: Pop rock; Latin pop; folk
- Occupations: Singers; songwriters; multi-instrumentalists
- Years active: 2005–present
- Label: Warner
- Members: Joy Huerta
- Past members: Jesse Huerta
- Website: jesseyjoy.com

Jesse & Joy (Spanish pronunciation: [ˈɟʝesi i ˈʝoj]) is a Mexican pop duo. It was formed in 2005 in Mexico City by brother and sister Jesse and Joy Huerta.

From 2005 to 2026, the duo released seven studio albums, one live album and one EP on Warner Music Latina, toured internationally, and have accumulated a Best Latin Pop Album Grammy Award and six Latin Grammy Awards in various categories. "Jesse & Joy are probably some of the purest, most talented artists of our generation," wrote Latin Times.

In September 2026, Jesse withdrew from the project citing personal reasons amid the promotion of a new tour. Joy, who learned about the decision minutes earlier, announced that the upcoming performances would not be canceled and that she would perform with Jesse's microphone in place.

== Early lives ==
The Huerta Uecke siblings were born in Mexico City to a Mexican father and an American mother. In 2001, inspired by their parents' love for classic, rock and folk music, when they were 18 and 15 years old, respectively, they began writing music and songs with their father using instruments from his church, which they attended when they were young.

== Career ==
=== 2005–2008: Career beginnings ===
Jesse & Joy signed with the Warner Music Latina group on April 18, 2005, after a family friend working at the label heard the home-made CDs the siblings had made for recreation. Jesse plays piano and guitar, while Joy plays guitar, drums and is the lead vocalist.

Introduced by the duo Sin Bandera at the 2005 Mexican Teletón, Jesse & Joy released their debut album Esta Es Mi Vida in 2006 through Warner Music Mexico. Their debut single, "Espacio Sideral", was certified gold by the Asociación Mexicana de Productores de Fonogramas y Videogramas (AMPROFON). The album reached the top twenty on the Mexican Album Chart, was certified platinum by the AMPROFON, and helped the duo to win the Latin Grammy Award for Best New Artist the next year.

In 2008, the duo released the Esto Es Lo Que Soy EP featuring "Espacio Sideral", "Ya No Quiero", "Volveré", "Llegaste Tú", and a new song called "Esto Es Lo Que Soy".

In 2009, their second studio album, Electricidad, was released. The album was certified gold by the AMPROFON and included singles "Adiós" and "Chocolate".

=== 2009–2014: Electricidad and ¿Con Quién Se Queda El Perro? ===
¿Con Quién Se Queda El Perro? was released as their third studio album in 2011. The album was certified 2× platinum, and included singles "Me Voy", "¡Corre!" and "La de la Mala Suerte". It received six Latin Grammy Awards and five nominations, as well as the group's first Grammy Award nomination for Best Latin Pop Album.

At the 2012 Latin Grammy Awards, Jesse & Joy were nominated for four Grammy Awards, winning three of them: Best Contemporary Pop Album for ¿Con Quién Se Queda El Perro?, and Song and Record of the Year for "¡Corre!". Additionally, together with Carlos López Estrada they received the Latin Grammy Award for Best Short Form Music Video for directing "Me Voy". On December 5, 2012, ¿Con Quién Se Queda El Perro? received a Grammy Award nomination for Best Latin Pop Album.

=== 2015–2017: Un Besito Más and wider recognition ===
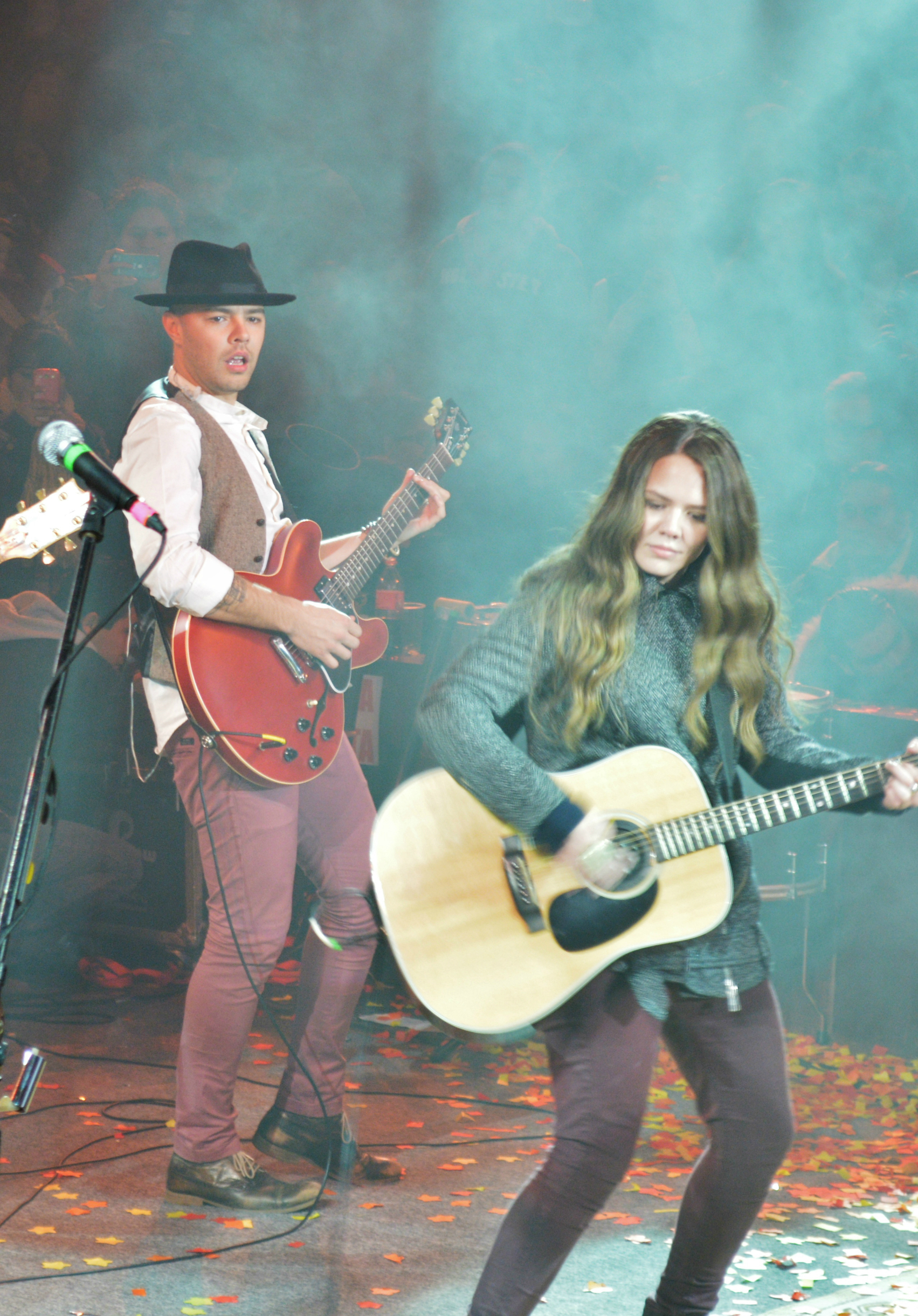
Jesse and Joy in 2013.

At the end of 2015, the pop duo released their fourth studio album titled “Un Besito Más ,” which went to Number One on the Latin Albums Chart. The group toured the United States, Latin America, and Spain to support the album, as well as solidifying their base with shows in Latin America. The album, produced by Fraser T Smith and Martin Terefe (Jason Mraz, James Morrison, and Shawn Mendes), included the song, "Un Besito Mas", which Jesse & Joy wrote after their father's death and is depicted in the video highlighting the US immigration issues.

Un Besito Mas earned four Latin Grammy Award nominations (in the categories of Record of the year, Album of the Year, Song of the Year and Best Contemporary Pop Album). That year, Jesse & Joy performed as part of the Latin Recording Academy's “Person of the Year” Gala honoring Roberto Carlos. The album, Un Besito Mas went on to win the Latin Grammy (2016) for Best Pop Vocal Album.

The release, shortly after, of their first-ever English songs, "Echoes of Love" and "More Than Amigos", extended the band's reach to the United Kingdom when the songs were playlisted on BBC Radio 1.

The Independent in the UK described album opener "Echoes of Love" as "true to their Latin/folk roots while introducing distinctly Adele-style epicness to the vocals".

In mid-2016, Jesse & Joy gained mainstream attention with the release of their first dual-language album, Jesse & Joy which contained English versions of songs from their past four studio releases and biggest hits such as "Corre! (Run!)", "Espacio Sideral (Outer Space)", "Ecos de Amor (Echoes of Love)", among others. The English/Spanish album was a logical step for the siblings, as Jesse later said: "I was blessed to be raised in a bi-cultural home. It showed me, from a young age, the beauty and power that lies in diversity, and working with my sister every day I experience the power that lies in unity: ‘Together we are stronger.’ All it takes is a little more time to understand and learn from one another."

At the 2017 American Grammy Award ceremony they received further mainstream recognition with their first-ever Grammy Award for Best Latin Pop Album honoring Un Besito Más, and in Joy's acceptance speech she dedicated the achievement to "all the Hispanics out there."

Jesse & Joy rounded out 2017 with appearances at the Latin American Music Awards, and at the Latin Grammy's "Person of the Year Gala" honoring Alejandro Sanz.

With their live Un Besito Más Tour, Jesse & Joy visited more than 15 countries and nearly 100 cities, including Buenos Aires, Madrid, Barcelona, Santiago de Chile, New York and Los Angeles.

=== 2018–2021: Touring and Aire ===
In 2018, Jesse & Joy embarked on another international tour, beginning at Chile's Viña Del Mar Festival, followed by the band’s homecoming to Mexico City's Arena Ciudad de Mexico.

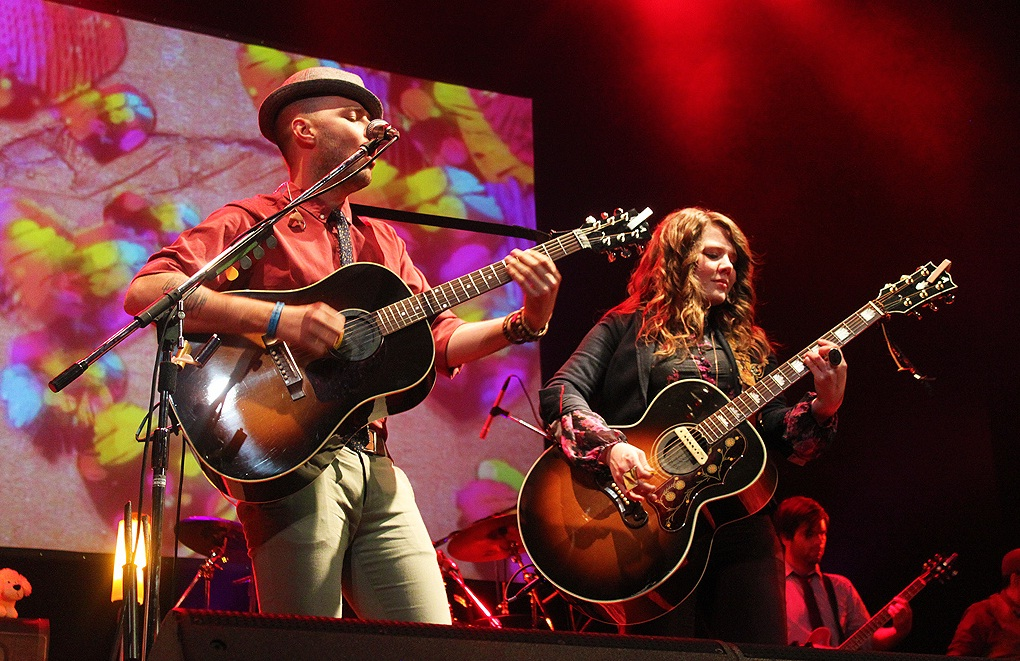
Jesse & Joy in concert in 2012

The duo received the 2018 Vision Award that September at the 31st Annual Hispanic Heritage Awards, which aired on PBS that month. The award recognizes Latinos with major contributions in music.

The two artists signed a deal with Kobalt Music for their worldwide publishing beginning with their 2018 single, "Te Esperé".

In April 2019, Jesse & Joy collaborated with Colombian singer J Balvin for the single, "Mañana es Too Late.” The song was written by the duo, along with Poo Bear (who has worked with David Guetta, Matoma, Justin Bieber, Mariah Carey, Skrillex, Juanes, Jennifer Lopez, Fifth Harmony) and produced by Jesse and Charlie Heat (Kanye West, Madonna). "Mañana es Too Late" reached #1 in Mexico.

Throughout May 2019, Jesse & Joy toured Mexico including another sold-out performance at Auditorio Nacional.

Joy was recognized by the Latin Recording Academy as one at the Leading Ladies of Entertainment at a gala June 2019 that took place in Mexico City. The honor, for Latinas who "during their lives have demonstrated enthusiasm, determination, leadership, pride in their roots and an indomitable spirit in continuous form," that included Tatiana Bilboa, Martha de Bayle, Alondra de la Parra, and Soumaya Slim Domit.

Jesse & Joy continue to tour in 2019, with shows in Latin American and the United States. Aire was released on June 5, 2020.

=== 2022–2026: Clichés, Lo Que Nos Faltó Decir, and Jesse's separation ===
On May 6, 2022, Jesse & Joy released a new album, Clichés.

On May 22, 2025, Jesse & Joy published Lo Que Nos Faltó Decir. On August 21, 2025, Jesse & Joy were featured on British singer Robbie Williams' single "Human".

In September 2026, Jesse announced splitting from the duo because he wanted some time for himself and his family. Joy said he learned about his decision only minutes earlier. The duo was amid the promotion of a new tour with Joy informing that the upcoming performances would not be canceled and that she would perform with Jesse's microphone in place. The following week, Jesse revealed his new solo project, Jesse and the Supernovas.

== Personal lives ==
In the beginning of 2019, Joy publicly came out as pansexual and announced she had been married to her wife, Diana Atri, for 7 years. In May, Atri gave birth to their daughter, Noah. In March 2021, she announced the birth of their second child, a son named Nour.

Jesse is married to his wife Monica, with whom he has two daughters: Hanna and Abby.

== Philanthropy ==
Jesse & Joy maintain an ongoing partnership with UnidosUS (formerly NCLR), the Hispanic civil rights and advocacy organization, and their “Electrify The Vote!". They performed acoustic shows in California, Texas, and Arizona intended to mobilize Latinos to vote. In addition, the musicians initiated personal recovery efforts following earthquakes in Mexico.

== Discography ==
=== Studio albums ===
List of studio albums, with selected chart positions, certifications and sales figures
Title	Album details	Peak chart positions				Certifications (sales thresholds)
Title	Album details	MEX	US Latin	US Latin Pop	US Heatseekers	Certifications (sales thresholds)
Esta Es Mi Vida	Released: August 22, 2006; Format: CD, digital download; Label: Warner Music Mexico	17	—	17	—	AMPROFON: Platinum; RIAA: Platinum (Latin)
Electricidad	Released: September 15, 2009; Format: CD, digital download; Label: Warner Music Mexico	21	14	3	22	AMPROFON: Gold
¿Con Quién Se Queda El Perro?	Released: December 6, 2011; Format: CD, digital download; Label: Warner Music Mexico	3	8	2	22	AMPROFON: 3× Platinum; RIAA: 4× Platinum (Latin)
Un Besito Más	Released: December 4, 2015; Format: CD, digital download; Label: Warner Music Mexico	5	1	1	—	AMPROFON: Platinum; RIAA: Gold (Latin)
Aire (Versión Día)	Released: May 8, 2020; Format: CD, digital download; Label: Warner Music Mexico	—	—	7	—	RIAA: Gold (Latin)
Clichés	Released: May 6, 2022; Format: CD, digital download; Label: Warner Music Mexico	—	—	—	—	
Lo Que Nos Faltó Decir	Released: May 22, 2025; Format: CD, digital download; Label: Warner Music Mexico	—	—	—	—	

=== Extended plays ===
List of extended plays, with selected chart positions
Title	Album details	Peak chart positions
Title	Album details	MEX
Esto Es Lo Que Soy	Released: March 17, 2008; Format: CD, digital download; Label: Warner Music Mexico	51

=== Live albums ===
Title	Album details	Peak chart positions
Title	Album details	MEX
Soltando al Perro	Released: March 25, 2014; Format: CD + DVD, digital download; Label: Warner Music Mexico	60

=== Singles ===
Year	Song	MEX	US LATIN	US LATIN Pop	U.S. Tropical Songs	CHI	COL	ARG	Album
2007	"Espacio Sideral"	—	35	15	—	—	23	—	Esta Es Mi Vida
2007	"Ya No Quiero"	—	—	40	—	—	41	—	Esta Es Mi Vida
2007	"Volveré"	—	—	—	—	—	—	—	Esta Es Mi Vida
2008	"Llegaste Tú"	—	32	12	—	3	22	—	Esta Es Mi Vida
2008	"Somos Lo Que Fue"	—	—	—	—	—	—	—	Esta Es Mi Vida
2008	"Esto Es Lo Que Soy"	—	30	14	—	—	—	—	Esto Es Lo Que Soy
2009	"Adiós"	—	13	3	—	8	37	—	Electricidad
2009	"Electricidad"	—	—	—	—	—	—	—	Electricidad
2010	"Chocolate"	13	—	29	—	—	—	—	Electricidad
2010	"Si Te Vas"	—	—	—	—	—	—	—	Electricidad
2011	"Me Voy"	7	—	30	—	—	58	—	¿Con Quién Se Queda El Perro?
2011	"¡Corre!"	1	4	1	34	—	20	—	¿Con Quién Se Queda El Perro?
2012	"La de la Mala Suerte"	1	23	6	6	—	33	—	¿Con Quién Se Queda El Perro?
2012	"¿Con Quién Se Queda El Perro?"	1	27	12	—	—	—	—	¿Con Quién Se Queda El Perro?
2012	"Llorar" (feat. Mario Domm)	1	9	4	37	—	13	—	¿Con Quién Se Queda El Perro?
2013	"Me Quiero Enamorar"	29	—	—	—	—	—	—	¿Con Quién Se Queda El Perro?
2013	"Dónde está el Amor" (with Pablo Alborán)	—	19	8	—	—	21	—	Tanto
2015	"Ecos de Amor"	1	33	11	—	—	25	—	Un Besito Más
2015	"No Soy Una de Esas" (with Alejandro Sanz)	1	17	3	—	—	16	—	Un Besito Más
2015	"Me Soltaste"	16	33	14	—	—	—	—	Un Besito Más
2016	"Dueles"	2	30	7	—	—	26	80	Un Besito Más
2017	"3 A.M." (featuring Gente de Zona)	1	22	6	2	1	7	3	Un Besito Más
2018	"Te Esperé"	1	9	14	—	9	10	35	Aire (Versión Día)
2019	"Mañana Es Too Late" (with J Balvin)	1	7	16	—	5	26	30	Aire (Versión Día)
2019	"Infinito" (with Andrés Cepeda)	—	—	—	—	—	27	—	TBA
2019	"Tanto" (with Luis Fonsi)	5	2	3	—	24	13	43	Aire (Versión Día)
2020	"Lo Nuestro Vale Más"	5	—	20	—	—	—	—	Aire (Versión Día)
2020	"Alguien Más"	10	—	—	—	—	—	—	Aire (Versión Día)
2022	"Respirar"	—	—	—	—	—	—	—	TBA

=== Other songs ===
Year	Song	Mexico (airplay)	U.S. Latin	U.S. Latin Pop	U.S. Tropical Songs	Album
2014	"Mi Tesoro"	—	11	3	—	Soltando al Perro
2013	"Corazón de Campeón"	—	—	—	—	Soltando al Perro
2012	"¡Corre!" (feat. La Republika)	1	4	1	1	Non-album song
2025	"Human" (Robbie Williams feat. Jesse & Joy)	—	—	—	—	Britpop

==== Year-end charts ====
Year	Song	U.S. Latin	U.S. Latin Pop
2008	"Llegaste Tú"	—	40
2009	"Adiós"	—	23
2012	La de la Mala Suerte	—	18
2012	"¡Corre!" (feat. La Republika)	26	9

==== Singles certification ====
Single	Country (provider)	Certifications (sales thresholds)
"Espacio Sideral"	Mexico (AMPROFON)	Gold (+ 30,000) Master Ringtones

== Awards and nominations ==
=== Grammy Awards ===
The Grammy Award is an accolade by the National Academy of Recording Arts and Sciences of the United States to recognize outstanding achievement on the music industry.

Year	Nominee / work	Award	Result
2013	¿Con Quién Se Queda El Perro?	Best Latin Pop Album	Nominated
2017	Un Besito Más	Best Latin Pop Album	Won

=== Latin American Music Awards ===
The Latin American Music Award is an accolade originally presented by Telemundo, and since 2023 by Univision. They are determined by a poll of the public and music buyers.

Year	Nominee / work	Award	Result
2015	Jesse & Joy	Favorite Pop/Rock Duo or Group	Nominated
2016	Jesse & Joy	Favorite Pop/Rock Duo or Group	Nominated
2016	Un Besito Más	Favorite Pop/Rock Album	Nominated
2016	"No Soy Una de Esas"	Favorite Pop/Rock Song	Nominated
2017	Jesse & Joy	Favorite Pop/Rock Duo or Group	Nominated
2023	Jesse & Joy	Favorite Duo or Group	Won

=== Latin Grammy Awards ===
A Latin Grammy Award is an accolade by the Latin Academy of Recording Arts & Sciences to recognize outstanding achievement in the music industry.

Year	Nominee / work	Award	Result
2007	Jesse & Joy	Best New Artist	Won
2007	Esta Es Mi Vida	Best Pop Album by a Duo or Group with Vocals	Nominated
2012	¿Con Quién Se Queda El Perro?	Album of the Year	Nominated
2012	¿Con Quién Se Queda El Perro?	Best Contemporary Pop Album	Won
2012	"¡Corre!"	Record of the Year	Won
2012	"¡Corre!"	Song of the Year	Won
2012	"Me Voy"	Best Short Form Music Video	Won
2013	"Llorar"	Song of the Year	Nominated
2014	"Mi Tesoro"	Song of the Year	Nominated
2014	"Dónde está el Amor"	Record of the Year	Nominated
2014	Soltando al Perro	Best Long Form Music Video	Nominated
2016	Un Besito Más	Album of the Year	Nominated
2016	Un Besito Más	Best Contemporary Pop Vocal Album	Won
2016	"Ecos de Amor"	Record of the Year	Nominated
2016	"Ecos de Amor"	Song of the Year	Nominated
