= Jesse Huerta =

Mexican musician (born 1982)

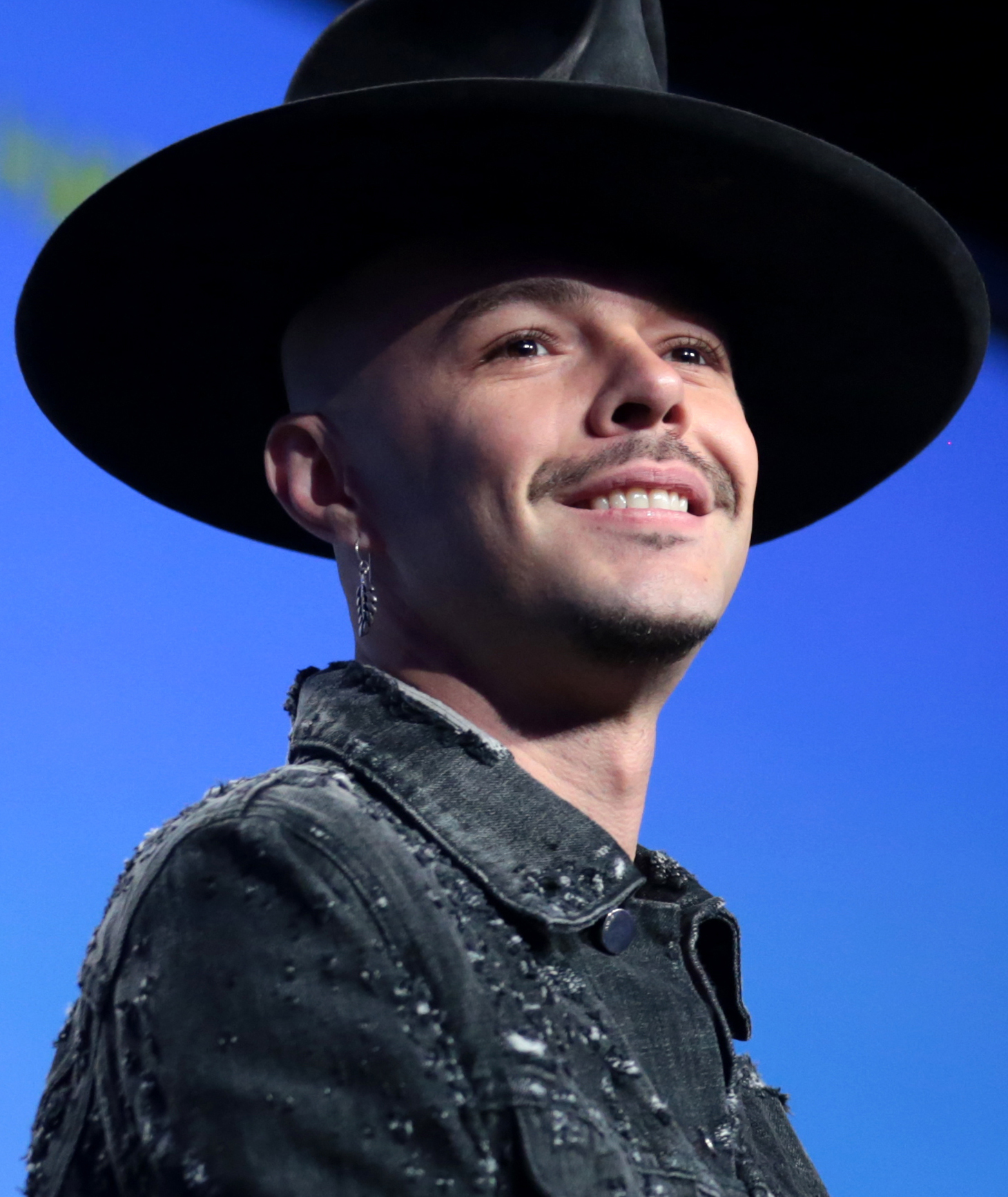
- Huerta at a National Council of La Raza event in 2017

Background information
- Born: Jesse Eduardo Huerta Uecke; December 31, 1982 (age 43); Mexico City, Mexico
- Genre: Latin pop
- Occupations: Singer; songwriter
- Instruments: Vocals; guitar; percussion
- Years active: 2005–present

Jesse Eduardo Huerta Uecke (born December 31, 1982) is a Mexican musician. He worked as the guitarist and background vocalist of Jesse & Joy, a duo he formed with his younger sister, Joy Huerta, in 2005.

With Jesse & Joy, Huerta released seven studio albums and won one Grammy Award and six Latin Grammy Awards.

In September 2026, Huerta announced he would split from the duo and begin his solo career under the band Jesse and the Supernovas. The debut single, "Interestelar", was released in October 2026.

Huerta is married and has two children.
