= List of airplay number-one hits in Uruguay =

Monitor Latino (stylised monitorLATINO) is a singles chart founded in 2003 which ranks songs on chart based on airplay across radio stations in Uruguay, as in most Latin American countries and Hispanic radio stations in the United States, using the Radio Tracking Data, LLC in real time. Monitor Latino launched in Uruguay in February 2017, providing three different charts: the Uruguay Top 20 (general airplay), the Uruguay Anglo Top 20 (music in English only), and the Uruguay Latin Top 20 (music in Spanish only).

== 2010s ==
2017 2018 2019

== 2020s ==
2020 2021 2022 2023 2024
