= List of airplay number-one singles of 2020 (Uruguay) =

Singles chart Monitor Latino ranks the songs which received the most airplay per week on radio station in Latin America, including Uruguay, since 2017. In 2020, 14 songs managed to top the chart, while "Tusa", by Karol G and Nicki Minaj, was the best-performing track of the year.

== Chart history ==
List of number-one singles
Issue date	Song	Artist(s)	Ref.
6 January	"Aguardiente"	Greeicy	
13 January	"Detente"	Mike Bahía featuring Danny Ocean	
20 January	"Detente"	Mike Bahía featuring Danny Ocean	
27 January	"Detente"	Mike Bahía featuring Danny Ocean	
3 February	"Muévelo"	Nicky Jam featuring Daddy Yankee	
10 February	"Muévelo"	Nicky Jam featuring Daddy Yankee	
17 February	"Muévelo"	Nicky Jam featuring Daddy Yankee	
24 February	"Muévelo"	Nicky Jam featuring Daddy Yankee	
2 March	"Tusa"	Karol G featuring Nicki Minaj	
9 March	"Tusa"	Karol G featuring Nicki Minaj	
16 March	"Tusa"	Karol G featuring Nicki Minaj	
23 March	"Tusa"	Karol G featuring Nicki Minaj	
30 March	"Tusa"	Karol G featuring Nicki Minaj	
6 April	"Tusa"	Karol G featuring Nicki Minaj	
13 April	"Tusa"	Karol G featuring Nicki Minaj	
20 April	"Muévelo"	Nicky Jam featuring Daddy Yankee	
27 April	"Sigo Aquí"	Al Cordaro	
4 May	"Sigo Aquí"	Al Cordaro	
11 May	"Sigo Aquí"	Al Cordaro	
18 May	"No Pidamos Perdón"	Andrés Cuervo featuring Fanny Lu	
25 May	"No Pidamos Perdón"	Andrés Cuervo featuring Fanny Lu	
1 June	"No Pidamos Perdón"	Andrés Cuervo featuring Fanny Lu	
8 June	"No Pidamos Perdón"	Andrés Cuervo featuring Fanny Lu	
15 June	"Tusa"	Karol G featuring Nicki Minaj	
22 June	"No Pidamos Perdón"	Andrés Cuervo featuring Fanny Lu	
29 June	"No Pidamos Perdón"	Andrés Cuervo featuring Fanny Lu	
6 July	"La Tentación"	Andrés Cuervo	
13 July	"La Tentación"	Andrés Cuervo	
20 July	"La Tentación"	Andrés Cuervo	
27 July	"La Tentación"	Andrés Cuervo	
3 August	"Los Consejos"	Greeicy	
10 August	"Los Consejos"	Greeicy	
17 August	"La Tentación"	Andrés Cuervo	
24 August	"Cuenta Conmigo"	Mike Bahía featuring Llane, Mozart La Para and PJ Sin Suela	
31 August	"Los Consejos"	Greeicy	
7 September	"Cuenta Conmigo"	Mike Bahía featuring Llane, Mozart la Para and PJ Sin Suela	
14 September	"Cuenta Conmigo"	Mike Bahía featuring Llane, Mozart la Para and PJ Sin Suela	
21 September	"Cuenta Conmigo"	Mike Bahía featuring Llane, Mozart la Para and PJ Sin Suela	
28 September	"Tú Me Bailas"	Alex Pompa	
5 October	"La Tentación"	Andrés Cuervo	
12 October	"Los Consejos"	Greeicy	
19 October	"Cuenta Conmigo"	Mike Bahía featuring Llane, Mozart la Para and PJ Sin Suela	
26 October	"Indecentes"	Andrés Cuervo	
2 November	"Indecentes"	Andrés Cuervo	
9 November	"Ay Amor"	Juan Y Rafa featuring Lucas Sugo	
16 November	"Indecentes"	Andrés Cuervo	
23 November	"Malditos Celos"	Ache featuring Anonimus	
30 November	"Malditos Celos"	Ache featuring Anonimus	
7 December	"Malditos Celos"	Ache featuring Anonimus	
14 December	"Malditos Celos"	Ache featuring Anonimus	
21 December	"Malditos Celos"	Ache featuring Anonimus	
28 December	Hawái (remix)	Maluma featuring The Weeknd	

== Number-one artists ==
List of number-one artists, with total weeks spent at number one shown
Position	Artist	Weeks at No. 1
1	Andrés Cuervo	15
2	Mike Bahía	8
2	Karol G	8
2	Nicki Minaj	8
3	Fanny Lu	6
4	Greeicy	5
4	Nicky Jam	5
4	Daddy Yankee	5
4	Llane	5
4	Mozart La Para	5
4	PJ Sin Suela	5
4	Ache	5
4	Anonimus	5
5	Danny Ocean	3
5	Al Cordaro	3
6	Alex Pompa	1
6	Juan Y Rafa	1
6	Lucas Sugo	1
6	Maluma	1
6	The Weeknd	1
