= List of airplay number-one singles of 2019 (Uruguay) =

Singles chart Monitor Latino ranks the songs which received the most airplay per week on radio station in Latin America, including Uruguay, since 2017. In 2019, 17 songs managed to top the chart, while "Pasarela", by Juan Y Rafa featuring Lucía, was the best-performing track of the year.

== Chart history ==
List of number-one singles
Issue date	Song	Artist(s)	Ref.
7 January	"Si Ya Te Olvidé"	Luciana	
14 January	"ABC"	Miway	
21 January	"Me Voy" (remix)	Rombai featuring Abraham Mateo and Reykon	
28 January	"Calma" (remix)	Pedro Capó featuring Farruko	
4 February	"Adán y Eva"	Paulo Londra	
11 February	"Adán y Eva"	Paulo Londra	
18 February	"Calma" (remix)	Pedro Capó featuring Farruko	
25 February	"Con Calma"	Daddy Yankee featuring Snow	
4 March	"Con Calma"	Daddy Yankee featuring Snow	
11 March	"Con Calma"	Daddy Yankee featuring Snow	
18 March	"Con Calma"	Daddy Yankee featuring Snow	
25 March	"Con Calma"	Daddy Yankee featuring Snow	
1 April	"Con Calma"	Daddy Yankee featuring Snow	
8 April	"Te Robaré"	Nicky Jam featuring Ozuna	
15 April	"Te Robaré"	Nicky Jam featuring Ozuna	
22 April	"Te Robaré"	Nicky Jam featuring Ozuna	
29 April	"Te Robaré"	Nicky Jam featuring Ozuna	
6 May	"Esclavo de tus Besos"	Manuel Turizo featuring Ozuna	
13 May	"Esclavo de tus Besos"	Manuel Turizo featuring Ozuna	
20 May	"Esclavo de tus Besos"	Manuel Turizo featuring Ozuna	
27 May	"Esclavo de tus Besos"	Manuel Turizo featuring Ozuna	
3 June	"La La"	Mike Bahía featuring Ovy on the Drums	
10 June	"Voce Voce"	Greice Santo	
17 June	"Voce Voce"	Greice Santo	
24 June	"Voce Voce"	Greice Santo	
1 July	"La La"	Mike Bahía featuring Ovy on the Drums	
8 July	"La La"	Mike Bahía featuring Ovy on the Drums	
15 July	"Bicha Mala"	Al Cordaro	
22 July	"Pasarela"	Juan y Rafa featuring Lucía	
29 July	"Pasarela"	Juan y Rafa featuring Lucía	
5 August	"Pasarela"	Juan y Rafa featuring Lucía	
12 August	"Pasarela"	Juan y Rafa featuring Lucía	
19 August	"Pasarela"	Juan y Rafa featuring Lucía	
26 August	"Pasarela"	Juan y Rafa featuring Lucía	
2 September	"Pasarela"	Juan y Rafa featuring Lucía	
9 September	"Atrevete"	Nicky Jam featuring Sech	
16 September	"Atrevete"	Nicky Jam featuring Sech	
23 September	"Atrevete"	Nicky Jam featuring Sech	
30 September	"Atrevete"	Nicky Jam featuring Sech	
7 October	"Tutu" (remix)	Camilo and Shakira featuring Pedro Capó	
14 October	"Tutu" (remix)	Camilo and Shakira featuring Pedro Capó	
21 October	"Te Quemaste"	Manuel Turizo featuring Anuel AA	
28 October	"Te Quemaste"	Manuel Turizo featuring Anuel AA	
4 November	"Te Quemaste"	Manuel Turizo featuring Anuel AA	
11 November	"Tutu" (remix)	Camilo and Shakira featuring Pedro Capó	
18 November	"Tutu" (remix)	Camilo and Shakira featuring Pedro Capó	
25 November	"Aguardiente"	Greeicy	
2 December	"Aguardiente"	Greeicy	
9 December	"Aguardiente"	Greeicy	
16 December	"Aguardiente"	Greeicy	
23 December	"Aguardiente"	Greeicy	
30 December	"Whine Up"	Nicky Jam featuring Anuel AA	

== Number-one artists ==
List of number-one artists, with total weeks spent at number one shown
Position	Artist	Weeks at No. 1
1	Nicky Jam	9
2	Ozuna	8
3	Manuel Turizo	7
3	Juan Y Rafa	7
3	Lucía	7
4	Pedro Capó	6
4	Daddy Yankee	6
4	Snow	6
5	Greeicy	5
6	Sech	4
6	Camilo	4
6	Shakira	4
6	Anuel AA	4
7	Mike Bahía	3
7	Ovy On The Drums	3
7	Greice Santo	3
8	Farruko	2
8	Paulo Londra	2
9	Luciana	1
9	Miway	1
9	Rombai	1
9	Abraham Mateo	1
9	Reikon	1
9	Al Cordaro	1
