= List of top 20 songs for 2015 in Mexico =

This is a list of the General Top 20 songs of 2015 in Mexico according to Monitor Latino. Monitor Latino issued two year-end General charts: one which ranked the songs by their number of plays on Mexican radio, and the other ranked the songs by their estimated audience. Monitor Latino also issued separate year-end charts for Regional Mexican, Pop and Anglo songs.

| № | by Audience size (estimated) | | by Plays (on radio) | |
| № | Title | Artist(s) | Title | Artist(s) |
|---|---|---|---|---|
| 1 | "Después de ti, ¿quién?" | La Adictiva Banda San José de Mesillas | "Después de ti, ¿quién?" | La Adictiva Banda San José de Mesillas |
| 2 | "Uptown Funk" | Mark Ronson ft. Bruno Mars | "Contigo" | Calibre 50 |
| 3 | "El perdón" | Nicky Jam & Enrique Iglesias | "Aunque ahora estés con él" | Calibre 50 |
| 4 | "Contigo" | Calibre 50 | "Uptown Funk" | Mark Ronson ft. Bruno Mars |
| 5 | "A lo mejor" | Banda MS | "El perdón" | Nicky Jam & Enrique Iglesias |
| 6 | "Lean On" | Major Lazer ft. DJ Snake | "Piénsalo" | Banda MS |
| 7 | "Aunque ahora estés con él" | Calibre 50 | "A lo mejor" | Banda MS |
| 8 | "Piénsalo" | Banda MS | "¿Qué tal si eres tú?" | Los Tigres del Norte |
| 9 | "Sugar" | Maroon 5 | "Lean On" | Major Lazer ft. DJ Snake |
| 10 | "Confesión" | La Arrolladora Banda El Limón | "El amor de su vida" | Julión Álvarez y su Norteño Banda |
| 11 | "Love Me like You Do" | Ellie Goulding | "Mi vicio más grande" | Banda el Recodo |
| 12 | "Cheerleader" | OMI | "Sugar" | Maroon 5 |
| 13 | "¿Por qué terminamos?" | Gerardo Ortiz | "Me interesa" | Alfredo Ríos "El Komander" |
| 14 | "See You Again" | Wiz Khalifa ft. Charlie Puth | "Confesión" | La Arrolladora Banda El Limón |
| 15 | "¿Qué tal si eres tú?" | Los Tigres del Norte | "Perdí la pose" | Espinoza Paz |
| 16 | "El amor de su vida" | Julión Álvarez y su Norteño Banda | "Te cambio el domicilio" | Banda Carnaval |
| 17 | "Thinking Out Loud" | Ed Sheeran | "Sal de mi vida" | La Original Banda El Limón |
| 18 | "Worth It" | Fifth Harmony ft. Kid Ink | "Cheerleader" | OMI |
| 19 | "Broche de oro" | Banda La Trakalosa de Monterrey | "Love Me like You Do" | Ellie Goulding |
| 20 | "Firestone" | Kygo ft. Conrad | "Tu mami" | Chuy Lizárraga y su Banda Tierra Sinaloense |

== See also ==
- List of number-one songs of 2015 (Mexico)
- List of number-one albums of 2015 (Mexico)
