= List of number-one songs of 2015 (Mexico) =

This is a list of the number-one songs of 2015 in Mexico. The airplay chart rankings are published by Monitor Latino, based on airplay across radio stations in Mexico using the Radio Tracking Data, LLC in real time. Charts are ranked from Monday to Sunday. Besides the General chart, Monitor Latino also publishes "Pop", "Popular" (Regional Mexican) and "Anglo" charts.

The streaming charts are published weekly by AMPROFON (Asociación Mexicana de Productores de Fonogramas y Videogramas).

== Chart history (Airplay) ==
Monitor Latino provides two lists for each chart: the "Audience" list ranks the songs according to the estimated number of people that listened to them on the radio during the week. The "Tocadas" (Spins) list ranks the songs according to the number of times they were played on the radio during the week.

The yellow background indicates the best-performing song of 2015.

=== General ===
Issue date	Song (Audience)	Song (Spins)	Ref
January 4	"Blame"^{Calvin Harris ft John Newman}	"Eres una niña"^{Gerardo Ortiz}	
January 11	"Uptown Funk"^{Mark Ronson ft Bruno Mars}	"Contigo"^{Calibre 50}	
January 18	"Contigo"^{Calibre 50}	"Contigo"^{Calibre 50}	
January 25	"¿Qué tal si eres tú?"^{Los Tigres del Norte}	"Contigo"^{Calibre 50}	
February 1	"Uptown Funk"^{Mark Ronson ft Bruno Mars}	"Contigo"^{Calibre 50}	
February 8	"Uptown Funk"^{Mark Ronson ft Bruno Mars}	"Contigo"^{Calibre 50}	
February 15	"Uptown Funk"^{Mark Ronson ft Bruno Mars}	"Contigo"^{Calibre 50}	
February 22	"Uptown Funk"^{Mark Ronson ft Bruno Mars}	"¿Qué tal si eres tú?"^{Los Tigres del Norte}	
March 1	"Contigo"^{Calibre 50}	"¿Qué tal si eres tú?"^{Los Tigres del Norte}	
March 8	"A lo mejor"^{Banda MS}	"¿Qué tal si eres tú?"^{Los Tigres del Norte}	
March 15	"A lo mejor"^{Banda MS}	"Culpable fui (Culpable soy)"^{Intocable}	
March 22	"Confesión"^{La Arrolladora Banda El Limón}	"¿Qué tal si eres tú?"^{Los Tigres del Norte}	
March 29	"Confesión"^{La Arrolladora Banda El Limón}	"Contigo"^{Calibre 50}	
April 5	"Después de ti, ¿quién?"^{La Adictiva Banda San José de Mesillas}	"Contigo"^{Calibre 50}	
April 12	"Después de ti, ¿quién?"^{La Adictiva Banda San José de Mesillas}	"Después de ti, ¿quién?"^{La Adictiva Banda San José de Mesillas}	
April 19	"Después de ti, ¿quién?"^{La Adictiva Banda San José de Mesillas}	"Después de ti, ¿quién?"^{La Adictiva Banda San José de Mesillas}	
April 26	"Después de ti, ¿quién?"^{La Adictiva Banda San José de Mesillas}	"Después de ti, ¿quién?"^{La Adictiva Banda San José de Mesillas}	
May 3	"Después de ti, ¿quién?"^{La Adictiva Banda San José de Mesillas}	"Contigo"^{Calibre 50}	
May 10	"Después de ti, ¿quién?"^{La Adictiva Banda San José de Mesillas}	"Después de ti, ¿quién?"^{La Adictiva Banda San José de Mesillas}	
May 17	"Después de ti, ¿quién?"^{La Adictiva Banda San José de Mesillas}	"Después de ti, ¿quién?"^{La Adictiva Banda San José de Mesillas}	
May 24	"Después de ti, ¿quién?"^{La Adictiva Banda San José de Mesillas}	"Después de ti, ¿quién?"^{La Adictiva Banda San José de Mesillas}	
May 31	"Después de ti, ¿quién?"^{La Adictiva Banda San José de Mesillas}	"Aunque ahora estés con él"^{Calibre 50}	
June 7	"Aunque ahora estés con él"^{Calibre 50}	"Aunque ahora estés con él"^{Calibre 50}	
June 14	"Tan cerquita"^{Aleks Syntek ft. Cristian Castro}	"Aunque ahora estés con él"^{Calibre 50}	
June 21	"Aunque ahora estés con él"^{Calibre 50}	"Aunque ahora estés con él"^{Calibre 50}	
June 28	"Aunque ahora estés con él"^{Calibre 50}	"Aunque ahora estés con él"^{Calibre 50}	
July 5	"Aunque ahora estés con él"^{Calibre 50}	"Aunque ahora estés con él"^{Calibre 50}	
July 12	"Aunque ahora estés con él"^{Calibre 50}	"Aunque ahora estés con él"^{Calibre 50}	
July 19	"Aunque ahora estés con él"^{Calibre 50}	"Aunque ahora estés con él"^{Calibre 50}	
July 26	"Aunque ahora estés con él"^{Calibre 50}	"Aunque ahora estés con él"^{Calibre 50}	
August 2	"Aunque ahora estés con él"^{Calibre 50}	"Aunque ahora estés con él"^{Calibre 50}	
August 9	"Aunque ahora estés con él"^{Calibre 50}	"Aunque ahora estés con él"^{Calibre 50}	
August 16	"Aunque ahora estés con él"^{Calibre 50}	"Aunque ahora estés con él"^{Calibre 50}	
August 23	"Aunque ahora estés con él"^{Calibre 50}	"Aunque ahora estés con él"^{Calibre 50}	
August 30	"Piénsalo"^{Banda MS}	"Aunque ahora estés con él"^{Calibre 50}	
September 6	"Piénsalo"^{Banda MS}	"Piénsalo"^{Banda MS}	
September 13	"La miel de su saliva"^{Banda el Recodo}	"Piénsalo"^{Banda MS}	
September 20	"Ginza"^{J Balvin}	"Ginza"^{J Balvin}	
September 27	"Ginza"^{J Balvin}	"Ginza"^{J Balvin}	
October 4	"Ginza"^{J Balvin}	"Ginza"^{J Balvin}	
October 11	"Ginza"^{J Balvin}	"Ginza"^{J Balvin}	
October 18	"Ginza"^{J Balvin}	"Ginza"^{J Balvin}	
October 25	"Ginza"^{J Balvin}	"Ginza"^{J Balvin}	
November 1	"Ginza"^{J Balvin}	"Ginza"^{J Balvin}	
November 8	"Ginza"^{J Balvin}	"¿Por qué me ilusionaste?"^{Remmy Valenzuela}	
November 15	"Ginza"^{J Balvin}	"¿Por qué me ilusionaste?"^{Remmy Valenzuela}	
November 22	"Locked Away"^{R. City ft Adam Levine}	"¿Por qué me ilusionaste?"^{Remmy Valenzuela}	
November 29	"Locked Away"^{R. City ft Adam Levine}	"La gripa"^{Calibre 50}	
December 6	"Locked Away"^{R. City ft Adam Levine}	"La gripa"^{Calibre 50}	
December 13	"Hello"^{Adele}	"La gripa"^{Calibre 50}	
December 20	"Sólo con verte"^{Banda MS}	"Pistearé"^{Banda Los Recoditos}	
December 27	"Hello"^{Adele}	"Pistearé"^{Banda Los Recoditos}	

=== Pop ===
Issue date	Song (Audience)	Song (Spins)	Ref
January 4	"Perdón, perdón"^{Ha*Ash}	"De Venus"^{Camila}	
January 11	"De Venus"^{Camila}	"Este frío"^{Kalimba}	
January 18	"De Venus"^{Camila}	"Este frío"^{Kalimba}	
January 25	"Este frío"^{Kalimba}	"Este frío"^{Kalimba}	
February 1	"Amore mio"^{Thalía}	"Este frío"^{Kalimba}	
February 8	"Amore mio"^{Thalía}	"Este frío"^{Kalimba}	
February 15	"Mi verdad"^{Maná ft. Shakira}	"Este frío"^{Kalimba}	
February 22	"Mi verdad"^{Maná ft. Shakira}	"Mi verdad"^{Maná ft. Shakira}	
March 1	"Mi verdad"^{Maná ft. Shakira}	"Mi verdad"^{Maná ft. Shakira}	
March 8	"Mi verdad"^{Maná ft. Shakira}	"Mi verdad"^{Maná ft. Shakira}	
March 15	"Mi verdad"^{Maná ft. Shakira}	"Mi verdad"^{Maná ft. Shakira}	
March 22	"Mi verdad"^{Maná ft. Shakira}	"Mi verdad"^{Maná ft. Shakira}	
March 29	"Mi verdad"^{Maná ft. Shakira}	"Mi verdad"^{Maná ft. Shakira}	
April 5	"Mi verdad"^{Maná ft. Shakira}	"Mi verdad"^{Maná ft. Shakira}	
April 12	"Mi verdad"^{Maná ft. Shakira}	"Mi verdad"^{Maná ft. Shakira}	
April 19	"Mi verdad"^{Maná ft. Shakira}	"Mi verdad"^{Maná ft. Shakira}	
April 26	"Mi verdad"^{Maná ft. Shakira}	"Mi verdad"^{Maná ft. Shakira}	
May 3	"Mi verdad"^{Maná ft. Shakira}	"Mi verdad"^{Maná ft. Shakira}	
May 10	"Mi verdad"^{Maná ft. Shakira}	"Mi verdad"^{Maná ft. Shakira}	
May 17	"El perdón"^{Nicky Jam & Enrique Iglesias}	"Mi verdad"^{Maná ft. Shakira}	
May 24	"El perdón"^{Nicky Jam & Enrique Iglesias}	"Mi verdad"^{Maná ft. Shakira}	
May 31	"El perdón"^{Nicky Jam & Enrique Iglesias}	"Un zombie a la intemperie"^{Alejandro Sanz}	
June 7	"El perdón"^{Nicky Jam & Enrique Iglesias}	"Un zombie a la intemperie"^{Alejandro Sanz}	
June 14	"Tan cerquita"^{Aleks Syntek ft. Cristian Castro}	"Un zombie a la intemperie"^{Alejandro Sanz}	
June 21	"Tan cerquita"^{Aleks Syntek ft. Cristian Castro}	"Un zombie a la intemperie"^{Alejandro Sanz}	
June 28	"Tan cerquita"^{Aleks Syntek ft. Cristian Castro}	"Tan cerquita"^{Aleks Syntek ft. Cristian Castro}	
July 5	"El perdón"^{Nicky Jam & Enrique Iglesias}	"Un zombie a la intemperie"^{Alejandro Sanz}	
July 12	"El perdón"^{Nicky Jam & Enrique Iglesias}	"Estrellas rotas"^{Kalimba}	
July 19	"El perdón"^{Nicky Jam & Enrique Iglesias}	"Estrellas rotas"^{Kalimba}	
July 26	"Estrellas rotas"^{Kalimba}	"Estrellas rotas"^{Kalimba}	
August 2	"Estrellas rotas"^{Kalimba}	"Estrellas rotas"^{Kalimba}	
August 9	"Estrellas rotas"^{Kalimba}	"Estrellas rotas"^{Kalimba}	
August 16	"Estrellas rotas"^{Kalimba}	"Estrellas rotas"^{Kalimba}	
August 23	"Ex de verdad"^{Ha*Ash}	"A que no me dejas"^{Alejandro Sanz ft. Alejandro Fernández}	
August 30	"Ecos de amor"^{Jesse y Joy}	"A que no me dejas"^{Alejandro Sanz ft. Alejandro Fernández}	
September 6	"Ecos de amor"^{Jesse y Joy}	"A que no me dejas"^{Alejandro Sanz ft. Alejandro Fernández}	
September 13	"Ecos de amor"^{Jesse y Joy}	"A que no me dejas"^{Alejandro Sanz ft. Alejandro Fernández}	
September 20	"Ecos de amor"^{Jesse y Joy}	"A que no me dejas"^{Alejandro Sanz ft. Alejandro Fernández}	
September 27	"Ginza"^{J Balvin}	"A que no me dejas"^{Alejandro Sanz ft. Alejandro Fernández}	
October 4	"Ecos de amor"^{Jesse y Joy}	"A que no me dejas"^{Alejandro Sanz ft. Alejandro Fernández}	
October 11	"Ecos de amor"^{Jesse y Joy}	"Ginza"^{J Balvin}	
October 18	"Ecos de amor"^{Jesse y Joy}	"Valiente"^{Paty Cantú}	
October 25	"Ecos de amor"^{Jesse y Joy}	"Valiente"^{Paty Cantú}	
November 1	"Carnaval"^{Maluma}	"Valiente"^{Paty Cantú}	
November 8	"Valiente"^{Paty Cantú}	"Valiente"^{Paty Cantú}	
November 15	"Valiente"^{Paty Cantú}	"Valiente"^{Paty Cantú}	
November 22	"Valiente"^{Paty Cantú}	"Valiente"^{Paty Cantú}	
November 29	"Valiente"^{Paty Cantú}	"Valiente"^{Paty Cantú}	
December 6	"Valiente"^{Paty Cantú}	"Valiente"^{Paty Cantú}	
December 13	"No soy una de esas"^{Jesse y Joy ft. Alejandro Sanz}	"Valiente"^{Paty Cantú}	
December 20	"No soy una de esas"^{Jesse y Joy ft. Alejandro Sanz}	"Las pequeñas cosas"^{Gloria Trevi}	
December 27	"No soy una de esas"^{Jesse y Joy ft. Alejandro Sanz}	"Las pequeñas cosas"^{Gloria Trevi}	

=== Popular ===
Issue date	Song (Audience)	Song (Spins)	Ref
January 4	"Háblame de ti"^{Banda MS}	"Eres una niña"^{Gerardo Ortiz}	
January 11	"Contigo"^{Calibre 50}	"Contigo"^{Calibre 50}	
January 18	"Contigo"^{Calibre 50}	"Contigo"^{Calibre 50}	
January 25	"¿Qué tal si eres tú?"^{Los Tigres del Norte}	"Contigo"^{Calibre 50}	
February 1	"¿Qué tal si eres tú?"^{Los Tigres del Norte}	"Si tuviera que decirlo"^{Pedro Fernández}	
February 8	"¿Qué tal si eres tú?"^{Los Tigres del Norte}	"Si tuviera que decirlo"^{Pedro Fernández}	
February 15	"Contigo"^{Calibre 50}	"No fue necesario"^{El Bebeto}	
February 22	"No fue necesario"^{El Bebeto}	"No fue necesario"^{El Bebeto}	
March 1	"No fue necesario"^{El Bebeto}	"No fue necesario"^{El Bebeto}	
March 8	"No fue necesario"^{El Bebeto}	"No fue necesario"^{El Bebeto}	
March 15	"A lo mejor"^{Banda MS}	"No fue necesario"^{El Bebeto}	
March 22	"Si tuviera que decirlo"^{Pedro Fernández}	"No fue necesario"^{El Bebeto}	
March 29	"Si tuviera que decirlo"^{Pedro Fernández}	"No fue necesario"^{El Bebeto}	
April 5	"Si tuviera que decirlo"^{Pedro Fernández}	"Si tuviera que decirlo"^{Pedro Fernández}	
April 12	"Si tuviera que decirlo"^{Pedro Fernández}	"Si tuviera que decirlo"^{Pedro Fernández}	
April 19	"Si tuviera que decirlo"^{Pedro Fernández}	"No fue necesario"^{El Bebeto}	
April 26	"Después de ti, ¿quién?"^{La Adictiva Banda San José de Mesillas}	"No fue necesario"^{El Bebeto}	
May 3	"Después de ti, ¿quién?"^{La Adictiva Banda San José de Mesillas}	"No fue necesario"^{El Bebeto}	
May 10	"Después de ti, ¿quién?"^{La Adictiva Banda San José de Mesillas}	"No fue necesario"^{El Bebeto}	
May 17	"Después de ti, ¿quién?"^{La Adictiva Banda San José de Mesillas}	"Después de ti, ¿quién?"^{La Adictiva Banda San José de Mesillas}	
May 24	"Después de ti, ¿quién?"^{La Adictiva Banda San José de Mesillas}	"Después de ti, ¿quién?"^{La Adictiva Banda San José de Mesillas}	
May 31	"Después de ti, ¿quién?"^{La Adictiva Banda San José de Mesillas}	"Aunque ahora estés con él"^{Calibre 50}	
June 7	"Aunque ahora estés con él"^{Calibre 50}	"Aunque ahora estés con él"^{Calibre 50}	
June 14	"Aunque ahora estés con él"^{Calibre 50}	"Aunque ahora estés con él"^{Calibre 50}	
June 21	"Aunque ahora estés con él"^{Calibre 50}	"Aunque ahora estés con él"^{Calibre 50}	
June 28	"Aunque ahora estés con él"^{Calibre 50}	"Aunque ahora estés con él"^{Calibre 50}	
July 5	"Aunque ahora estés con él"^{Calibre 50}	"Aunque ahora estés con él"^{Calibre 50}	
July 12	"Aunque ahora estés con él"^{Calibre 50}	"Aunque ahora estés con él"^{Calibre 50}	
July 19	"Aunque ahora estés con él"^{Calibre 50}	"Aunque ahora estés con él"^{Calibre 50}	
July 26	"Aunque ahora estés con él"^{Calibre 50}	"Aunque ahora estés con él"^{Calibre 50}	
August 2	"Aunque ahora estés con él"^{Calibre 50}	"Aunque ahora estés con él"^{Calibre 50}	
August 9	"Aunque ahora estés con él"^{Calibre 50}	"Aunque ahora estés con él"^{Calibre 50}	
August 16	"Aunque ahora estés con él"^{Calibre 50}	"Aunque ahora estés con él"^{Calibre 50}	
August 23	"Aunque ahora estés con él"^{Calibre 50}	"Soltero disponible"^{Regulo Caro}	
August 30	"Aunque ahora estés con él"^{Calibre 50}	"Soltero disponible"^{Regulo Caro}	
September 6	"Soltero disponible"^{Regulo Caro}	"Soltero disponible"^{Regulo Caro}	
September 13	"La miel de su saliva"^{Banda el Recodo}	"Soltero disponible"^{Regulo Caro}	
September 20	"Piénsalo"^{Banda MS}	"Soltero disponible"^{Regulo Caro}	
September 27	"Piénsalo"^{Banda MS}	"Te cambio el domicilio"^{Banda Carnaval}	
October 4	"La peda"^{Banda Los Recoditos}	"Te cambio el domicilio"^{Banda Carnaval}	
October 11	"La peda"^{Banda Los Recoditos}	"Te cambio el domicilio"^{Banda Carnaval}	
October 18	"La miel de su saliva"^{Banda el Recodo}	"Te cambio el domicilio"^{Banda Carnaval}	
October 25	"La miel de su saliva"^{Banda el Recodo}	"Te cambio el domicilio"^{Banda Carnaval}	
November 1	"El viejón"^{La Adictiva Banda San José de Mesillas}	"La gripa"^{Calibre 50}	
November 8	"¿Por qué me ilusionaste?"^{Remmy Valenzuela}	"¿Por qué me ilusionaste?"^{Remmy Valenzuela}	
November 15	"¿Por qué me ilusionaste?"^{Remmy Valenzuela}	"¿Por qué me ilusionaste?"^{Remmy Valenzuela}	
November 22	"¿Por qué me ilusionaste?"^{Remmy Valenzuela}	"¿Por qué me ilusionaste?"^{Remmy Valenzuela}	
November 29	"¿Por qué me ilusionaste?"^{Remmy Valenzuela}	"¿Por qué me ilusionaste?"^{Remmy Valenzuela}	
December 6	"¿Por qué me ilusionaste?"^{Remmy Valenzuela}	"¿Por qué me ilusionaste?"^{Remmy Valenzuela}	
December 13	"¿Por qué me ilusionaste?"^{Remmy Valenzuela}	"¿Por qué me ilusionaste?"^{Remmy Valenzuela}	
December 20	"Sólo con verte"^{Banda MS}	"Pistearé"^{Banda Los Recoditos}	
December 27	"Sólo con verte"^{Banda MS}	"Pistearé"^{Banda Los Recoditos}	

=== Anglo ===
Issue date	Song (Audience)	Song (Spins)	Ref
January 4	"Habits"^{Tove Lo}	"Habits"^{Tove Lo}	
January 11	"Habits"^{Tove Lo}	"Habits"^{Tove Lo}	
January 18	"Habits"^{Tove Lo}	"Habits"^{Tove Lo}	
January 25	"Habits"^{Tove Lo}	"Uptown Funk"^{Mark Ronson ft. Bruno Mars}	
February 1	"Uptown Funk"^{Mark Ronson ft. Bruno Mars}	"Uptown Funk"^{Mark Ronson ft. Bruno Mars}	
February 8	"Uptown Funk"^{Mark Ronson ft. Bruno Mars}	"Uptown Funk"^{Mark Ronson ft. Bruno Mars}	
February 15	"Uptown Funk"^{Mark Ronson ft. Bruno Mars}	"Uptown Funk"^{Mark Ronson ft. Bruno Mars}	
February 22	"Uptown Funk"^{Mark Ronson ft. Bruno Mars}	"Uptown Funk"^{Mark Ronson ft. Bruno Mars}	
March 1	"Uptown Funk"^{Mark Ronson ft. Bruno Mars}	"Uptown Funk"^{Mark Ronson ft. Bruno Mars}	
March 8	"Uptown Funk"^{Mark Ronson ft. Bruno Mars}	"Uptown Funk"^{Mark Ronson ft. Bruno Mars}	
March 15	"Uptown Funk"^{Mark Ronson ft. Bruno Mars}	"Uptown Funk"^{Mark Ronson ft. Bruno Mars}	
March 22	"Sugar"^{Maroon 5}	"Uptown Funk"^{Mark Ronson ft. Bruno Mars}	
March 29	"Uptown Funk"^{Mark Ronson ft. Bruno Mars}	"Uptown Funk"^{Mark Ronson ft. Bruno Mars}	
April 5	"Uptown Funk"^{Mark Ronson ft. Bruno Mars}	"Uptown Funk"^{Mark Ronson ft. Bruno Mars}	
April 12	"Uptown Funk"^{Mark Ronson ft. Bruno Mars}	"Sugar"^{Maroon 5}	
April 19	"Sugar"^{Maroon 5}	"Sugar"^{Maroon 5}	
April 26	"Sugar"^{Maroon 5}	"Sugar"^{Maroon 5}	
May 3	"Sugar"^{Maroon 5}	"Sugar"^{Maroon 5}	
May 10	"Sugar"^{Maroon 5}	"Sugar"^{Maroon 5}	
May 17	"Sugar"^{Maroon 5}	"Sugar"^{Maroon 5}	
May 24	"See You Again"^{Wiz Khalifa ft. Charlie Puth}	"See You Again"^{Wiz Khalifa ft. Charlie Puth}	
May 31	"See You Again"^{Wiz Khalifa ft. Charlie Puth}	"See You Again"^{Wiz Khalifa ft. Charlie Puth}	
June 7	"See You Again"^{Wiz Khalifa ft. Charlie Puth}	"See You Again"^{Wiz Khalifa ft. Charlie Puth}	
June 14	"See You Again"^{Wiz Khalifa ft. Charlie Puth}	"See You Again"^{Wiz Khalifa ft. Charlie Puth}	
June 21	"See You Again"^{Wiz Khalifa ft. Charlie Puth}	"Lean On"^{Major Lazer ft. DJ Snake}	
June 28	"Lean On"^{Major Lazer ft. DJ Snake}	"Lean On"^{Major Lazer ft. DJ Snake}	
July 5	"Lean On"^{Major Lazer ft. DJ Snake}	"Lean On"^{Major Lazer ft. DJ Snake}	
July 12	"Lean On"^{Major Lazer ft. DJ Snake}	"Lean On"^{Major Lazer ft. DJ Snake}	
July 19	"Lean On"^{Major Lazer ft. DJ Snake}	"Lean On"^{Major Lazer ft. DJ Snake}	
July 26	"Lean On"^{Major Lazer ft. DJ Snake}	"Lean On"^{Major Lazer ft. DJ Snake}	
August 2	"Worth It"^{Fifth Harmony ft. Kid Ink}	"Lean On"^{Major Lazer ft. DJ Snake}	
August 9	"Lean On"^{Major Lazer ft. DJ Snake}	"Lean On"^{Major Lazer ft. DJ Snake}	
August 16	"Lean On"^{Major Lazer ft. DJ Snake}	"Lean On"^{Major Lazer ft. DJ Snake}	
August 23	"Lean On"^{Major Lazer ft. DJ Snake}	"Lean On"^{Major Lazer ft. DJ Snake}	
August 30	"Lean On"^{Major Lazer ft. DJ Snake}	"Lean On"^{Major Lazer ft. DJ Snake}	
September 6	"Cheerleader"^{Omi}	"Cheerleader"^{Omi}	
September 13	"Can't Feel My Face"^{The Weeknd}	"Cheerleader"^{Omi}	
September 20	"How Deep Is Your Love"^{Calvin Harris ft. Disciples}	"Cheerleader"^{Omi}	
September 27	"How Deep Is Your Love"^{Calvin Harris ft. Disciples}	"How Deep Is Your Love"^{Calvin Harris ft. Disciples}	
October 4	"What Do You Mean?"^{Justin Bieber}	"I Can't Feel My Face"^{The Weeknd}	
October 11	"Can't Feel My Face"^{The Weeknd}	"What Do You Mean?"^{Justin Bieber}	
October 18	"Can't Feel My Face"^{The Weeknd}	"What Do You Mean?"^{Justin Bieber}	
October 25	"Can't Feel My Face"^{The Weeknd}	"What Do You Mean?"^{Justin Bieber}	
November 1	"How Deep Is Your Love"^{Calvin Harris ft. Disciples}	"Can't Feel My Face"^{The Weeknd}	
November 8	"Locked Away"^{R. City ft. Adam Levine}	"Can't Feel My Face"^{The Weeknd}	
November 15	"How Deep Is Your Love"^{Calvin Harris ft. Disciples}	"Can't Feel My Face"^{The Weeknd}	
November 22	"Locked Away"^{R. City ft. Adam Levine}	"Locked Away"^{R. City ft. Adam Levine}	
November 29	"Locked Away"^{R. City ft. Adam Levine}	"Locked Away"^{R. City ft. Adam Levine}	
December 6	"Hello"^{Adele}	"Hello"^{Adele}	
December 13	"Hello"^{Adele}	"Hello"^{Adele}	
December 20	"Sorry"^{Justin Bieber ft. J Balvin}	"Hello"^{Adele}	
December 27	"Hello"^{Adele}	"Hello"^{Adele}	

== Chart history (Streaming) ==
Issue date	Song	Artist(s)	Ref.
June 21	"Lean On"	Major Lazer & DJ Snake ft. MØ	
June 28	"Lean On"	Major Lazer & DJ Snake ft. MØ	
October 8	"Ginza"	J Balvin	
October 29	"Sorry"	Justin Bieber	
November 26	"Sorry"	Justin Bieber	
December 10	"Sorry"	Justin Bieber	

== See also ==
- List of Top 20 songs for 2015 in Mexico
- List of number-one albums of 2015 (Mexico)
