= Ginza (song) =

2015 song by J Balvin

Single by J Balvin

from the album Energía
- Released: July 17, 2015
- Genre: Reggaeton
- Length: 2:49; 6:33 (remix)
- Label: Capitol Latin; Universal
- Songwriters: José Osorio; Alejandro Ramírez; Rene Cano; Alejandro Patiño; Salomón Villada Hoyos
- Producers: Ramírez; Patiño

J Balvin singles chronology
"Tu Sombra" (2014)	"Ginza" (2015)	"Ginza (Remix)" (2015)

Music video
- "Ginza" on YouTube

"Ginza" is a song performed by Colombian singer J Balvin. It was released as the lead single from the singer's studio album Energía on July 17, 2015.

"Ginza" was commercially successful, positioning itself inside the top 10 in most Latin American markets and crossing over to European radio. It reached number one in several charts, including Balvin's native Colombia, Mexico, Spain, Italy and the Latin charts in the United States, where the song became the longest-reigning number one by a solo act, surpassing a record previously held by Juanes' "Me Enamora" and Flex's "Te Quiero".

A remix featuring well-known reggaeton singers Daddy Yankee, Farruko, Yandel, De La Ghetto, Nicky Jam, Arcángel and Zion of Zion & Lennox was released on November 27, 2015. In January 2016, an additional remix featuring Brazilian singer Anitta was released only in Brazil.

== Background ==
The name of the song came from an image filter that J Balvin constantly used on the social network Instagram. Balvin decided to put that name after his fans "took the name". According to Universal Music Group, "Ginza" represents "a city in Japan, where fashion is preeminent, showing that the title is the perfect representation of the great loves of the artist, his fans, his music and fashion."

Balvin said about "Ginza": "raised to leave my comfort zone," also said that "we took the risk of giving a new sound to the world" and "cowards never write anything."

According to "Feid" (as is known artistically Solomon Villada Hoyos), one of the composers of the song, the process of creation of the theme was worked alongside all the composers and producers: "While [Alejandro" Sky "Ramirez] was doing lyrics, in Then the sounds that were also being generated made you feel things, joy, sadness, love or mistrust. "Villada also said that "the track is different, the lyrics are rare, there are metaphors."

== Reception ==
Billboard's Leila Cobo qualified the song with three stars to five topic. Cobo said that although Balvin is known for his "infused melody of reggaeton", "Ginza" is all about "rhythm," with an arrangement "electro minimalist flourishes inspired by Calypso and low lows and unexpected tones." Cobo concluded that the track, does not have an "irresistible chorus", such as the other single from the singer "6 AM", "Goodbye to clubs, women and dance movement still wake up in you".

"Ginza" became the single most successful of the artist's career. In Colombia, "Ginza" was placed first in the general list of National Report, also received a gold record certification, of five thousand legal copies sold. In Mexico, the song also has a gold record attributed by the Asociación Mexicana de Productores de Fonogramas y Videogramas (AMPROFON), thanks to its high impact, since reaching the first position in the lists of airplay made by Billboard. In the Dominican Republic, it reached number three, while in Venezuela, the track is positioned in tenth place in the general list of Record Report. "Ginza" also has a gold certification in Chile and triple platinum in Peru.

== Charts ==
=== Weekly charts ===
Chart (2015–16)	Peak position
Colombia (National-Report)	1
Dominican Republic (Monitor Latino)	1
France (SNEP)	22
Hungary (Dance Top 40)	39
Hungary (Single Top 40)	11
Italy (FIMI)	1
Italy Airplay (EarOne)	1
Mexico (Billboard Mexican Airplay)	1
Netherlands (Dutch Top 40)	83
Panama (Monitor Latino)	12
Poland (Polish Airplay Top 100)	43
Romania (Romanian Top 100)	2
Slovakia Airplay (ČNS IFPI)	66
Spain (Promusicae)	1
Switzerland (Schweizer Hitparade)	33
US Billboard Hot 100	84
US Hot Latin Songs (Billboard)	1
US Latin Airplay (Billboard)	1
US Latin Rhythm Airplay (Billboard)	1
US Tropical Airplay (Billboard)	2
Venezuela (Record Report)	6

=== Year-end charts ===
Chart (2015)	Position
Spain (PROMUSICAE)	13
US Hot Latin Songs (Billboard)	5

Chart (2016)	Position
France (SNEP)	171
Italy (FIMI)	10
Switzerland (Schweizer Hitparade)	84
Spain (PROMUSICAE)	23
US Hot Latin Songs (Billboard)	3

=== Decade-end charts ===
Chart (2010–2019)	Position
US Hot Latin Songs (Billboard)	7

=== All-time charts ===
Chart (2021)	Position
US Hot Latin Songs (Billboard)	20

== Certifications ==
Region	Certification	Certified units/sales
Brazil (Pro-Música Brasil)	2× Diamond	500,000^{‡}
Italy (FIMI)	5× Platinum	250,000^{‡}
Mexico (AMPROFON)	6× Diamond+4× Platinum+Gold	2,070,000^{‡}
Portugal (AFP)	Platinum	20,000^{‡}
Spain (Promusicae)	4× Platinum	160,000^{‡}
United States (RIAA)	Diamond (Latin)	600,000^{‡}
^{‡} Sales+streaming figures based on certification alone.

== Ginza (Remix) ==
"Ginza ft. Anitta"

Single by J Balvin featuring Anitta
- Language: Spanish; Portuguese
- Released: February 25, 2016

J Balvin singles chronology
"Ginza (Remix)" (2015)	"Ginza ft. Anitta" (2016)	"Love Is the Name" (2016)

Anitta singles chronology
"Essa Mina é Louca" (2016)	"Ginza ft. Anitta" (2016)	"Cravo e Canela" (2016)

Two official remixes were released for various markets. One directed at the Latin American market, released on November 27, 2015, which brought the participation of Daddy Yankee, Farruko, Yandel, Nicky Jam, De La Ghetto, Arcangel and Zion. The other released in Brazil in January 2016, with the participation of singer Anitta.

== See also ==
- List of number-one songs of 2015 (Mexico)
- List of number-one singles of 2015 (Spain)
- List of number-one Billboard Hot Latin Songs of 2015
- List of number-one Billboard Hot Latin Songs of 2016
