= List of airplay number-one singles of 2022 (Uruguay) =

Singles chart Monitor Latino ranks the songs which received the most airplay per week on radio station in Latin America, including Uruguay, since 2017. In 2022, 14 songs managed to top the chart, while the John Legend remix of "Tacones Rojos", by Rauw Alejandro, was the best-performing track of the year.

== Chart history ==
List of number-one singles
Issue date	Song	Artist(s)	Ref.
3 January	"Tacones Rojos" (remix)	Sebastián Yatra featuring John Legend	
10 January	"Mon Amour (remix)	Aitana featuring Zzoilo	
17 January	"Calma"	Géminis	
24 January	"Así No Vale"	Emil featuring Ir Sais	
31 January	"Así No Vale"	Emil featuring Ir Sais	
7 February	"De 100 a 0"	Manuel Turizo	
14 February	"De 100 a 0"	Manuel Turizo	
21 February	"De 100 a 0"	Manuel Turizo	
28 February	"Mon Amour" (remix)	Aitana featuring Zzoilo	
7 March	"Así No Vale"	Emil featuring Ir Sais	
14 March	"Así No Vale"	Emil featuring Ir Sais	
21 March	"Así No Vale"	Emil featuring Ir Sais	
28 March	"Así No Vale"	Emil featuring Ir Sais	
4 April	"Deprimida"	Ozuna	
11 April	"Deprimida"	Ozuna	
18 April	"Deprimida"	Ozuna	
25 April	"Deprimida"	Ozuna	
2 May	"Deprimida"	Ozuna	
9 May	"Deprimida"	Ozuna	
16 May	"Deprimida"	Ozuna	
23 May	"La Triple T"	Tini	
30 May	"La Triple T"	Tini	
6 June	"Provenza"	Karol G	
13 June	"Te Felicito"	Shakira featuring Rauw Alejandro	
20 June	"Te Felicito"	Shakira featuring Rauw Alejandro	
27 June	"La Triple T"	Tini	
4 July	"Creo" (remix)	Amarion featuring Ozuna	
11 July	"Creo" (remix)	Amarion featuring Ozuna	
18 July	"Creo" (remix)	Amarion featuring Ozuna	
25 July	"Creo" (remix)	Amarion featuring Ozuna	
1 August	"Creo" (remix)	Amarion featuring Ozuna	
8 August	"Creo" (remix)	Amarion featuring Ozuna	
15 August	"Creo" (remix)	Amarion featuring Ozuna	
22 August	"Despechá"	Rosalía	
29 August	"Quevedo: Bzrp Music Sessions, Vol. 52"	Bizarrap featuring Quevedo	
5 September	"Quevedo: Bzrp Music Sessions, Vol. 52"	Bizarrap featuring Quevedo	
12 September	"Despechá"	Rosalía	
19 September	"Despechá"	Rosalía	
26 September	"Despechá"	Rosalía	
3 October	"Despechá"	Rosalía	
10 October	"Despechá"	Rosalía	
17 October	"Despechá"	Rosalía	
24 October	"Despechá"	Rosalía	
31 October	"Quevedo: Bzrp Music Sessions, Vol. 52"	Bizarrap featuring Quevedo	
7 November	"Monotonía"	Shakira featuring Ozuna	
14 November	"Hey Mor"	Ozuna featuring Feid	
21 November	"Hey Mor"	Ozuna featuring Feid	
28 November	"Hey Mor"	Ozuna featuring Feid	
5 December	"Hey Mor"	Ozuna featuring Feid	
12 December	"Hey Mor"	Ozuna featuring Feid	
19 December	"Hey Mor"	Ozuna featuring Feid	
26 December	"Hey Mor"	Ozuna featuring Feid	

== Number-one artists ==
List of number-one artists, with total weeks spent at number one shown
Position	Artist	Weeks at No. 1
1	Ozuna	22
2	Rosalía	8
3	Amarion	7
3	Feid	7
4	Emil	6
4	Ir Sais	6
5	Manuel Turizo	3
5	Tini	3
5	Shakira	3
5	Bizarrap	3
5	Quevedo	3
6	Aitana	2
6	Zzoilo	2
6	Rauw Alejandro	2
7	Sebastián Yatra	1
7	John Legend	1
7	Géminis	1
7	Karol G	1
