= Llane =

Colombian singer (born 1990)

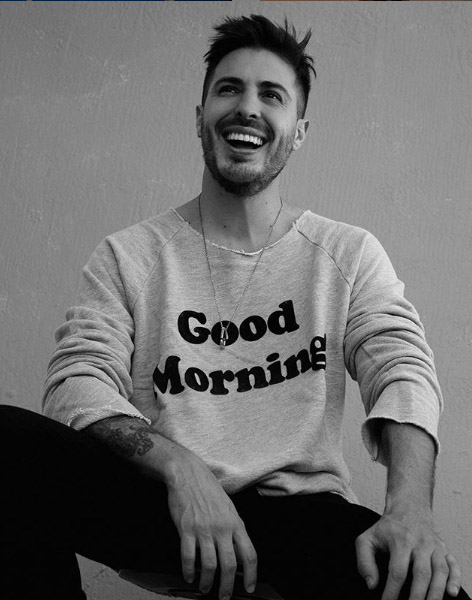

Background information
- Born: Juan David Castaño Montoya; January 20, 1990 (age 35)
- Genres: Latin; soul; pop
- Occupation: Singer

Llane (born Juan David Castaño Montoya on January 20, 1990 in Sabaneta, Colombia) is a Colombian singer, formerly a member of the group Piso 21 and now a solo artist.

== Career ==
Llane spent 12 years with the group Piso 21, enjoying success in several countries. In February 2019 he announced via YouTube that he was leaving the group to begin a solo career. On October 18, 2019, he released his first solo single, "Más de ti"., and on January 31, 2020, he released the second one, "Amor bailando". Llane also made his live debut as a solo artist at the Megaland 2019 outdoor music concert in Bogota on November 30, 2019.

Llane released his debut album titled “Fino” in 2022.

== Discography ==
=== Studio albums ===
List of studio albums, with selected details, chart positions, sales, and certifications
Title	Details	Peak chart positions
Title	Details	COL
Fino	Released: June 16, 2022; Label: Warner Music México; Formats: Digital download, streaming	

=== Extended plays ===
- Vivo Presente (En Vivo Desde Medellín, 2021) (2021)

=== Singles ===
==== As lead artist ====
Title	Year	Peak chart positions			Certifications	Album
Title	Year	COL	ECU	MEX	Certifications	Album
"Más de ti"	2019	17	11	23		Fino
"Amor bailando"	2020	—	—	—		Non-album singles
"Pa' ti"	2020	—	—	—		Non-album singles
"No Copia" (with Yera)	2020	—	—	—		Non-album singles
"Como Antes"	2020	—	—	—		Fino
"Cuenta Conmigo" (with Mike Bahía and PJ Sin Suela featuring Mozart La Para)	2020					Contento
"Será" (with Manuel Turizo)	2020					Fino
"Insisto"	2021					Non-album single
"Presente y Futuro" (with Zion and Álvaro Díaz)	2021					Fino
"Otra vez" (with Mario Bautista and Lyanno)	2021					5
"Puñales" (with Boza)	2021					Fino
"Dime (Masters en Parranda)" (with Carlos Vives and Gusi)	2021					Masters en Parranda (Colombian Pop Collection)
"Alcancía" (with Reik and Khea)	2022					Fino
"Sueño" (with Omar Montes)	2022					Fino
"Fino" (with Danny Ocean)	2022					Fino
"Parcerita"	2022					Non-album single
"Bendita" (with Las Villa)	2023					Eclipse
"Obvio"	2023					Non-album singles
"Casi"	2023					Non-album singles
"Licencia Pa Beber"	2023					Non-album singles
"No Es Suficiente" (with iZaak)	2024					Non-album singles
"Como Este Bolero" (with Cholo Valderrama)	2025					Non-album singles
"Como Este Bolero"	2025					Non-album singles
"Cómo No Voy a Decirlo"	2025					TBA

==== As featured artist ====
- "TBT (Remix)" (Sebastián Yatra, Rauw Alejandro and Manuel Turizo featuring Cosculluela, Lalo Ebratt, Llane and Dálmata) (2020)
- "Faena" (Polina featuring Llane) (2022)

=== Guest appearances ===
- "Tu Amiga" with Tainy, Justin Quiles, Dylan Fuentes and Lennox (2020)
- "Hola qué tal?" with Dvicio (2020)
- "Me haces falta" with Fonseca and Andrés Cepeda (2020)
- "Olvídala" with Nacho (2020)
- "Como No Voy a Decirlo - Special Version" with Luis Silva (2021)
- "El Aquí y el Ahora" with Ximena Sariñana (2021)
