= List of number-one songs of 2018 (Panama) =

This is a list of the number-one songs of 2018 in Panama. The charts are published by Monitor Latino, based on airplay across radio stations in Panama using the Radio Tracking Data, LLC in real time. The chart week runs from Monday to Sunday.

During 2018, twelve singles reached number one in Panama; a thirteenth single, "Mi Gente (Remix)" by J Balvin and Willy William featuring Beyoncé began its run at number one in July 2017. Of those twelve number-one singles, ten were collaborations. In total, twenty-two acts topped the chart as either lead or featured artists, with fourteen—Becky G, Bad Bunny, Demi Lovato, Nicky Jam, Will Smith, Era Istrefi, Anitta, Lalo Ebratt, Trapical, DJ Snake, Selena Gomez, Cardi B, Ozuna and Kenny Man—achieving their first number-one single in Panama.

In Panama, the best-performing single of 2018 was "Dura" by Daddy Yankee. It spent 19 non-consecutive weeks atop the charts, becoming the second longest-running number-one song in the country, behind "Despacito" by Luis Fonsi (2017). With "Dura", Daddy Yankee holds the record as the act with the most cumulative weeks at number one in Panama, with 43 weeks in total.

J Balvin once again became the only act to have multiple number-one singles in Panama. In 2018, J Balvin earned three number-one songs: "X" with Nicky Jam, "No es justo" with Zion & Lennox and "Mocca (Remix)" with Lalo Ebratt. It became the third consecutive year that J Balvin hit a number-one song in the country.

== Chart history ==
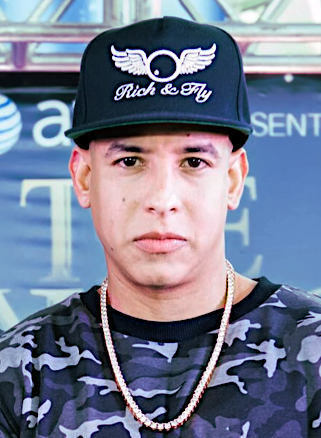
"Dura" by Daddy Yankee (pictured) became the best-performing single of 2018 in Panama, and the second longest-running number-one song spending 19 weeks topping the Panamanian charts. With that song, Daddy Yankee earned the record for the most cumulative weeks at number one in Panama, with 43 weeks in total.

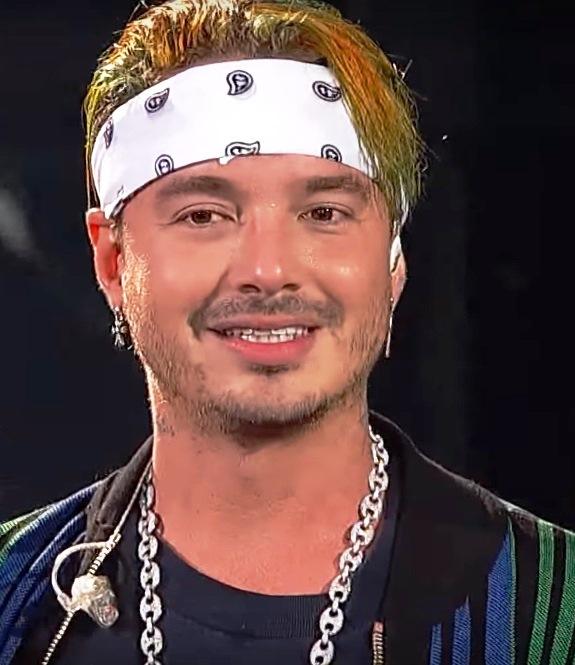
J Balvin (pictured) scored three number-one hits in Panama with "X", "No es justo" and "Mocca (Remix)", extending his own record for being the act with the most number-one singles in Panama.

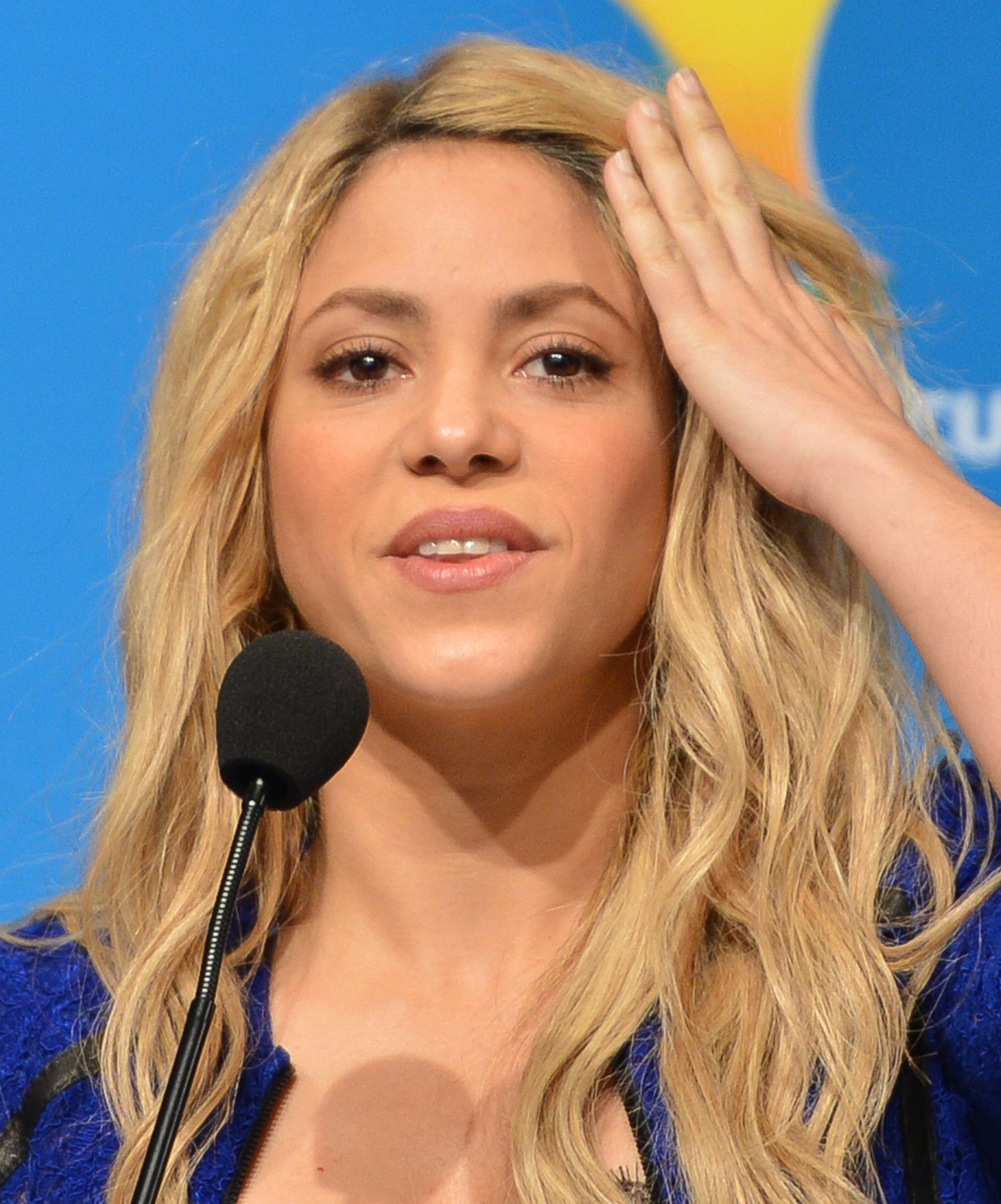
Shakira (pictured) scored her fourth number-one song in Panama with "Clandestino", and marked her first since 1999's "Inevitable".

Key
†	Indicates best-performing single of 2018

Issue date	Song	Artist	Reference
1 January	"Mi Gente (Remix)"	J Balvin and Willy William featuring Beyoncé	
8 January	"Mayores"	Becky G and Bad Bunny	
15 January	"Échame la Culpa"	Luis Fonsi and Demi Lovato	
22 January	"Échame la Culpa"	Luis Fonsi and Demi Lovato	
29 January	"Dura" †	Daddy Yankee	
5 February	"Dura" †	Daddy Yankee	
12 February	"Dura" †	Daddy Yankee	
19 February	"Dura" †	Daddy Yankee	
26 February	"Dura" †	Daddy Yankee	
5 March	"Dura" †	Daddy Yankee	
12 March	"Dura" †	Daddy Yankee	
19 March	"Dura" †	Daddy Yankee	
26 March	"Dura" †	Daddy Yankee	
2 April	"Dura" †	Daddy Yankee	
9 April	"Dura" †	Daddy Yankee	
16 April	"Dura" †	Daddy Yankee	
23 April	"Dura" †	Daddy Yankee	
30 April	"Dura" †	Daddy Yankee	
7 May	"Dura" †	Daddy Yankee	
14 May	"Dura" †	Daddy Yankee	
21 May	"Dura" †	Daddy Yankee	
28 May	"Dura" †	Daddy Yankee	
4 June	"X"	Nicky Jam and J Balvin	
11 June	"Live It Up"	Nicky Jam featuring Will Smith and Era Istrefi	
18 June	"Dura" †	Daddy Yankee	
25 June	"X"	Nicky Jam and J Balvin	
2 July	"X"	Nicky Jam and J Balvin	
9 July	"No es justo"	J Balvin and Zion & Lennox	
16 July	"No es justo"	J Balvin and Zion & Lennox	
23 July	"Clandestino"	Shakira and Maluma	
30 July	"No es justo"	J Balvin and Zion & Lennox	
6 August	"No es justo"	J Balvin and Zion & Lennox	
13 August	"No es justo"	J Balvin and Zion & Lennox	
20 August	"No es justo"	J Balvin and Zion & Lennox	
27 August	"No es justo"	J Balvin and Zion & Lennox	
3 September	"Rosas o espinas"	Joey Montana	
10 September	"Rosas o espinas"	Joey Montana	
17 September	"Rosas o espinas"	Joey Montana	
24 September	"Rosas o espinas"	Joey Montana	
1 October	"Mala Mía (Remix)"	Maluma featuring Becky G and Anitta	
8 October	"Mala Mía (Remix)"	Maluma featuring Becky G and Anitta	
15 October	"Mocca (Remix)"	Lalo Ebratt featuring J Balvin and Trapical	
22 October	"Taki Taki"	DJ Snake featuring Selena Gomez, Ozuna and Cardi B	
29 October	"Taki Taki"	DJ Snake featuring Selena Gomez, Ozuna and Cardi B	
5 November	"Taki Taki"	DJ Snake featuring Selena Gomez, Ozuna and Cardi B	
12 November	"Taki Taki"	DJ Snake featuring Selena Gomez, Ozuna and Cardi B	
19 November	"Taki Taki"	DJ Snake featuring Selena Gomez, Ozuna and Cardi B	
26 November	"Taki Taki"	DJ Snake featuring Selena Gomez, Ozuna and Cardi B	
3 December	"Taki Taki"	DJ Snake featuring Selena Gomez, Ozuna and Cardi B	
10 December	"Taki Taki"	DJ Snake featuring Selena Gomez, Ozuna and Cardi B	
17 December	"Taki Taki"	DJ Snake featuring Selena Gomez, Ozuna and Cardi B	
24 December	"Ni Gucci Ni Prada"	Kenny Man and Sebastián Yatra	
31 December	"Ni Gucci Ni Prada"	Kenny Man and Sebastián Yatra	
