= List of number-one Anglo songs of 2017 (Panama) =

Panamanian singles of 2017

This is a list of the Panamanian English number-one songs of 2017. The charts are published by Monitor Latino, based exclusively for English-language songs on airplay across radio stations in Panama using the Radio Tracking Data, LLC in real time. The chart week runs from Monday to Sunday.

== Chart history ==
Key
†	Indicates best-performing single of 2017

Issue date	Song	Artist	Reference
2 January	"Work"	Rihanna featuring Drake	
9 January	"One Dance"	Drake featuring Wizkid and Kyla	
16 January	"Trumpets"	Sak Noel and Salvi featuring Sean Paul	
23 January	"Trumpets"	Sak Noel and Salvi featuring Sean Paul	
30 January	"Let Me Love You"	DJ Snake featuring Justin Bieber	
6 February	"Let Me Love You"	DJ Snake featuring Justin Bieber	
13 February	"Rockabye"	Clean Bandit featuring Sean Paul and Anne-Marie	
20 February	"Belly Dancehall"	BK featuring Mr. Saik	
27 February	"Rockabye"	Clean Bandit featuring Sean Paul and Anne-Marie	
6 March	"24K Magic"	Bruno Mars	
13 March	"Shape of You" †	Ed Sheeran	
20 March	"Shape of You" †	Ed Sheeran	
27 March	"Shape of You" †	Ed Sheeran	
3 April	"Shape of You" †	Ed Sheeran	
10 April	"Shape of You" †	Ed Sheeran	
17 April	"Shape of You" †	Ed Sheeran	
24 April	"Shape of You" †	Ed Sheeran	
1 May	"Shape of You" †	Ed Sheeran	
8 May	"Shape of You" †	Ed Sheeran	
15 May	"Shape of You" †	Ed Sheeran	
22 May	"Shape of You" †	Ed Sheeran	
29 May	"Shape of You" †	Ed Sheeran	
5 June	"Shape of You" †	Ed Sheeran	
12 June	"Shape of You" †	Ed Sheeran	
19 June	"Shape of You" †	Ed Sheeran	
26 June	"Shape of You" †	Ed Sheeran	
3 July	"Shape of You" †	Ed Sheeran	
10 July	"Shape of You" †	Ed Sheeran	
17 July	"Shape of You" †	Ed Sheeran	
24 July	"Wild Thoughts"	DJ Khaled featuring Rihanna and Bryson Tiller	
31 July	"Shape of You" †	Ed Sheeran	
7 August	"Wild Thoughts"	DJ Khaled featuring Rihanna and Bryson Tiller	
14 August	"Shape of You" †	Ed Sheeran	
21 August	"Wild Thoughts"	DJ Khaled featuring Rihanna and Bryson Tiller	
28 August	"Wild Thoughts"	DJ Khaled featuring Rihanna and Bryson Tiller	
4 September	"Wild Thoughts"	DJ Khaled featuring Rihanna and Bryson Tiller	
11 September	"Wild Thoughts"	DJ Khaled featuring Rihanna and Bryson Tiller	
18 September	"Wild Thoughts"	DJ Khaled featuring Rihanna and Bryson Tiller	
25 September	"Wild Thoughts"	DJ Khaled featuring Rihanna and Bryson Tiller	
2 October	"Wild Thoughts"	DJ Khaled featuring Rihanna and Bryson Tiller	
9 October	"Wild Thoughts"	DJ Khaled featuring Rihanna and Bryson Tiller	
16 October	"Wild Thoughts"	DJ Khaled featuring Rihanna and Bryson Tiller	
23 October	"Wild Thoughts"	DJ Khaled featuring Rihanna and Bryson Tiller	
30 October	"Wild Thoughts"	DJ Khaled featuring Rihanna and Bryson Tiller	
6 November	"Shape of You" †	Ed Sheeran	
13 November	"Havana"	Camila Cabello featuring Young Thug	
20 November	"Havana"	Camila Cabello featuring Young Thug	
27 November	"Havana"	Camila Cabello featuring Young Thug	
4 December	"Havana"	Camila Cabello featuring Young Thug	
11 December	"Havana"	Camila Cabello featuring Young Thug	
18 December	"Havana"	Camila Cabello featuring Young Thug	
25 December	"Havana"	Camila Cabello featuring Young Thug	
