= List of number-one songs of 2021 (Mexico) =

This is a list of the number-one songs of 2021 in Mexico. The airplay chart rankings are published by Monitor Latino, based on airplay across radio stations in Mexico using the Radio Tracking Data, LLC in real time. Charts are compiled from Monday to Sunday.

== Chart history (airplay) ==
Besides the General chart, Monitor Latino publishes "Pop", "Popular" (Regional Mexican music) and "Anglo" charts. Monitor Latino provides two lists for each of these charts: the "Audience" list ranked the songs according to the estimated number of people that listened to them on the radio during the week. and "Tocadas" (Spins) list ranked the songs according to the number of times they were played on the radio during the week.

=== General ===
Issue date	Song (Audience)	Song (Spins)	Ref.
3 January	"Dime Cómo Quieres"^{Christian Nodal featuring Ángela Aguilar}	"Dime Cómo Quieres"^{Christian Nodal featuring Ángela Aguilar}	
10 January	"Dime Cómo Quieres"^{Christian Nodal featuring Ángela Aguilar}	"Dime Cómo Quieres"^{Christian Nodal featuring Ángela Aguilar}	
17 January	"100 años"^{Carlos Rivera featuring Maluma}	"Dime Cómo Quieres"^{Christian Nodal featuring Ángela Aguilar}	
24 January	"Dime Cómo Quieres"^{Christian Nodal featuring Ángela Aguilar}	"Dime Cómo Quieres"^{Christian Nodal featuring Ángela Aguilar}	
31 January	"Mi niña"^{Wisin featuring Mike Towers}	"Dime Cómo Quieres"^{Christian Nodal featuring Ángela Aguilar}	
7 February	"Dime Cómo Quieres"^{Christian Nodal featuring Ángela Aguilar}	"Dime Cómo Quieres"^{Christian Nodal featuring Ángela Aguilar}	
14 February	"Tan enamorados"^{CNCO}	"Dime Cómo Quieres"^{Christian Nodal featuring Ángela Aguilar}	
21 February	"De vuelta pa´la vuelta"^{Daddy Yankee featuring Marc Anthony}	"De vuelta pa´la vuelta"^{Daddy Yankee featuring Marc Anthony}	
