= List of number-one Anglo songs of 2021 (Panama) =

Panamanian singles of 2021

This is a list of the Anglo number-one songs of 2021 in Panama. The charts are published by Monitor Latino, based exclusively for English-language songs on airplay across radio stations in Panama using the Radio Tracking Data, LLC in real time. The chart week runs from Monday to Sunday.

== Chart history ==
Issue date	Song	Artist	Reference
4 January	"Girl Like Me"	Black Eyed Peas and Shakira	
11 January	"Girl Like Me"	Black Eyed Peas and Shakira	
18 January	"Girl Like Me"	Black Eyed Peas and Shakira	
25 January	"Girl Like Me"	Black Eyed Peas and Shakira	
1 February	"Girl Like Me"	Black Eyed Peas and Shakira	
8 February	"Girl Like Me"	Black Eyed Peas and Shakira	
15 February	"Girl Like Me"	Black Eyed Peas and Shakira	
22 February	"Girl Like Me"	Black Eyed Peas and Shakira	
1 March	"Girl Like Me"	Black Eyed Peas and Shakira	
8 March	"Girl Like Me"	Black Eyed Peas and Shakira	
15 March	"Girl Like Me"	Black Eyed Peas and Shakira	
22 March	"Girl Like Me"	Black Eyed Peas and Shakira	
29 March	"Peaches"	Justin Bieber featuring Daniel Caesar and Giveon	
5 April	"Peaches"	Justin Bieber featuring Daniel Caesar and Giveon	
12 April	"Peaches"	Justin Bieber featuring Daniel Caesar and Giveon	
19 April	"Peaches"	Justin Bieber featuring Daniel Caesar and Giveon	
26 April	"Peaches"	Justin Bieber featuring Daniel Caesar and Giveon	
3 May	"Peaches"	Justin Bieber featuring Daniel Caesar and Giveon	
10 May	"Peaches"	Justin Bieber featuring Daniel Caesar and Giveon	
17 May	"Peaches"	Justin Bieber featuring Daniel Caesar and Giveon	
24 May	"Peaches"	Justin Bieber featuring Daniel Caesar and Giveon	
