= List of number-one songs of 2020 (Panama) =

This is a list of the number-one songs of 2020 in Panama. The charts are published by Monitor Latino, based on airplay across radio stations in Panama using the Radio Tracking Data, LLC in real time. The chart week runs from Monday to Sunday.

In 2020, eleven singles reached number one in Panama; a twelfth single, "Ya No Más" by Nacho, Joey Montana and Yandel featuring Sebastián Yatra, began its run at number one in December 2019. Of those eleven number-one singles, fourteen acts topped the chart as either lead or featured artists, with nine—Karol G, Nicki Minaj, Carlos Vives, Myke Towers, CNCO, Greeicy, Cali y El Dandee, Wisin and The Weeknd—achieving their first number-one single in Panama.

"Tusa" by Karol G and Nicki Minaj was the longest-running number-one of the year, and later ranked as the best-performing single of 2020 in Panama, leading the chart for fourteen consecutive weeks, tying with "Con Calma" by Daddy Yankee featuring Snow (2018) as the fourth longest-running number-one song in Panama.

Carlos Vives is the only act to have multiple number-one songs in 2020, with three apiece.

== Chart history ==
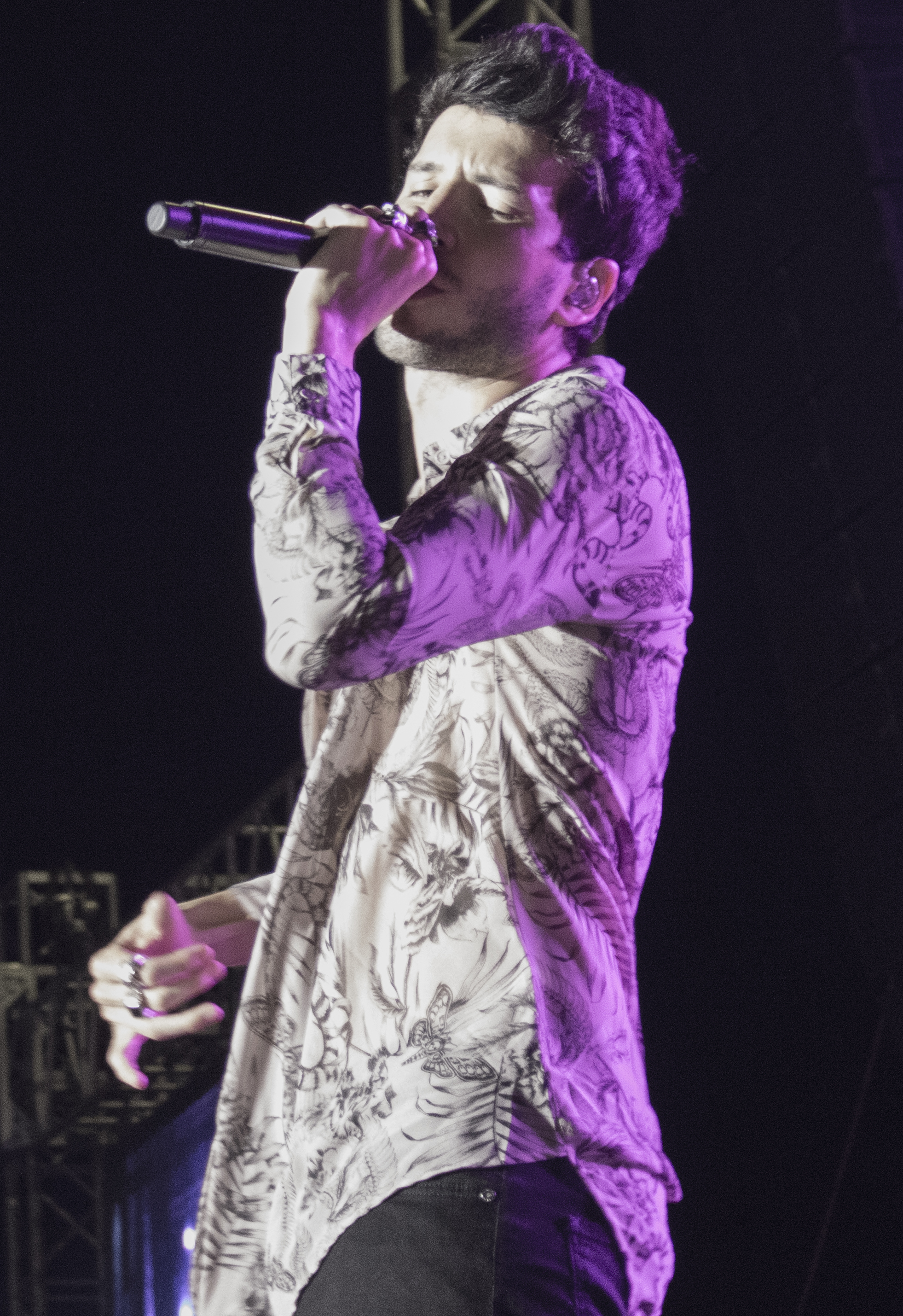
With "Ya No Más" topping the charts in 2019 and 2020, Sebastián Yatra (pictured), Joey Montana, Nacho and Yandel became the first four acts to rule the Panamanian charts in two separate decades since its inception in 2016.

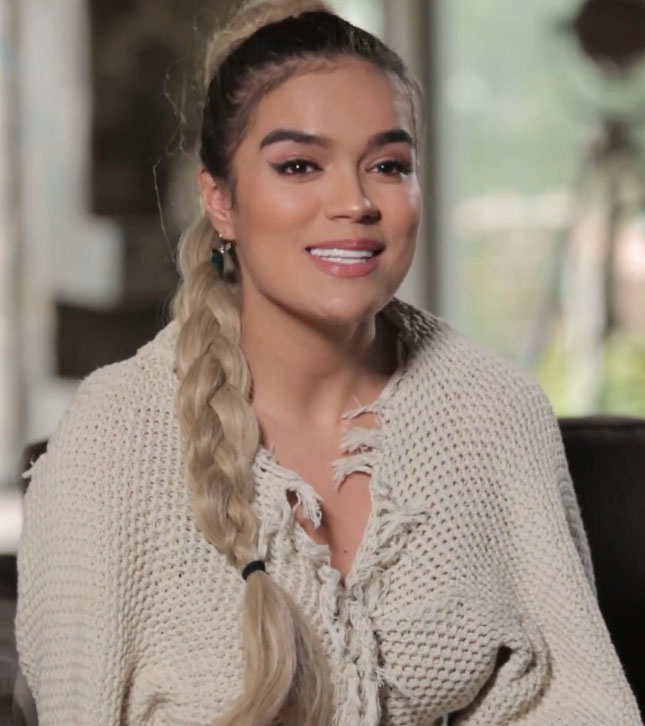
"Tusa" by Karol G (pictured) and Nicki Minaj, was the longest-running number-one song of 2020 in Panama, spending 14 consecutive weeks atop the chart. It also was ranked as the best-performing single of 2020 in Panama.

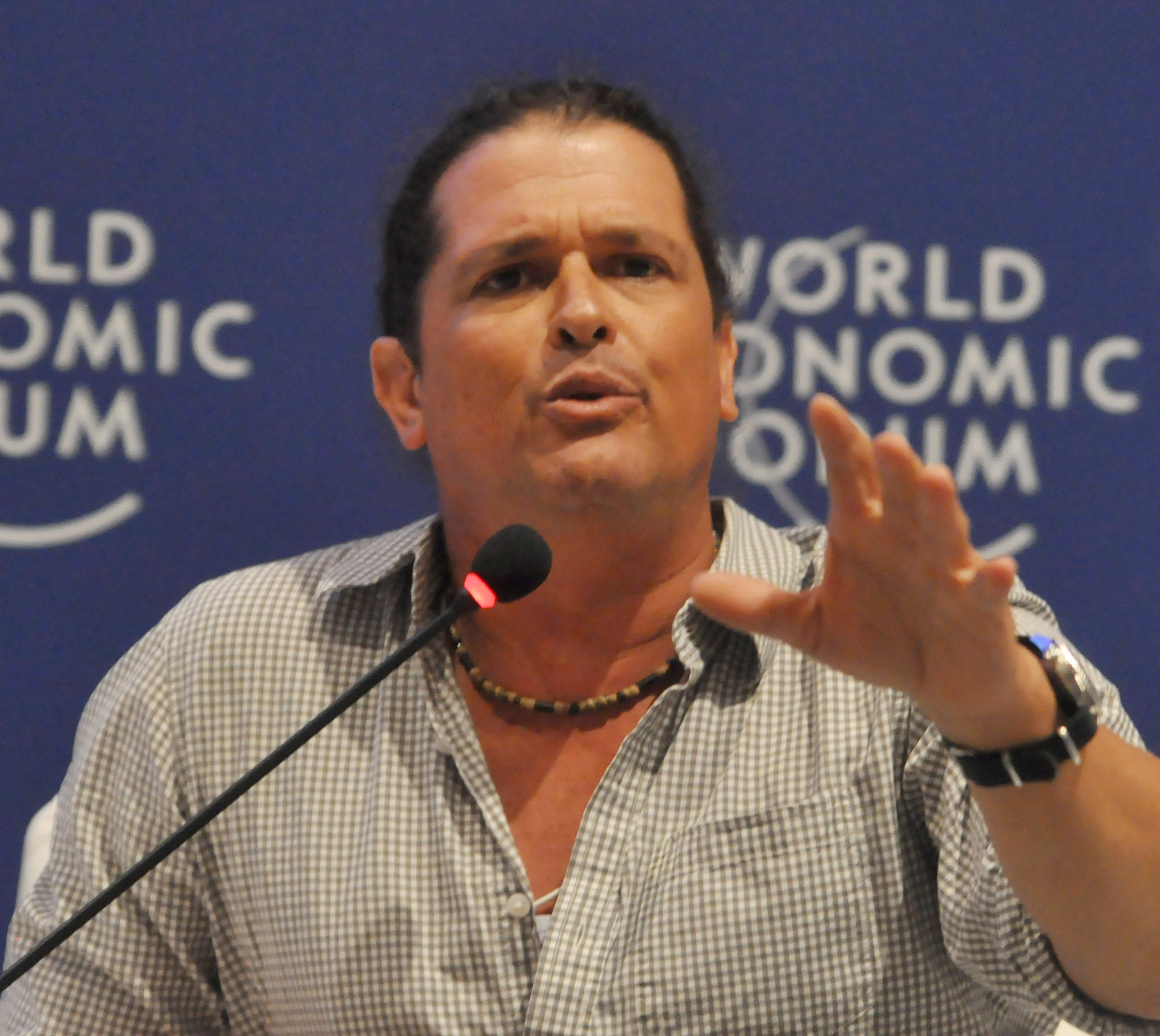
Carlos Vives (pictured), earned three number-one songs in Panama in 2020 with "No Te Vayas", "For Sale" and "Cumbiana", becoming the only act to have multiple number-one songs in 2020.

Key
| † | Indicates best-performing single of 2020 |

| Issue date | Song | Artist | Reference |
|---|---|---|---|
| 6 January | "Ya No Más" | Nacho, Joey Montana and Yandel featuring Sebastián Yatra | |
| 13 January | "Tusa" † | Karol G and Nicki Minaj | |
| 20 January | "Tusa" † | Karol G and Nicki Minaj | |
| 27 January | "Tusa" † | Karol G and Nicki Minaj | |
| 3 February | "Tusa" † | Karol G and Nicki Minaj | |
| 10 February | "Tusa" † | Karol G and Nicki Minaj | |
| 17 February | "Tusa" † | Karol G and Nicki Minaj | |
| 24 February | "Tusa" † | Karol G and Nicki Minaj | |
| 2 March | "Tusa" † | Karol G and Nicki Minaj | |
| 9 March | "Tusa" † | Karol G and Nicki Minaj | |
| 16 March | "Tusa" † | Karol G and Nicki Minaj | |
| 23 March | "Tusa" † | Karol G and Nicki Minaj | |
| 30 March | "Tusa" † | Karol G and Nicki Minaj | |
| 6 April | "Tusa" † | Karol G and Nicki Minaj | |
| 13 April | "Tusa" † | Karol G and Nicki Minaj | |
| 20 April | "No Te Vayas" | Carlos Vives | |
| 27 April | "No Te Vayas" | Carlos Vives | |
| 4 May | "No Te Vayas" | Carlos Vives | |
| 11 May | "No Te Vayas" | Carlos Vives | |
| 18 May | "No Te Vayas" | Carlos Vives | |
| 25 May | "No Te Vayas" | Carlos Vives | |
| 1 June | "Diosa" | Myke Towers | |
| 8 June | "ADMV" | Maluma | |
| 15 June | "ADMV" | Maluma | |
| 22 June | "ADMV" | Maluma | |
| 29 June | "ADMV" | Maluma | |
| 6 July | "Caramelo" | Ozuna | |
| 13 July | "Caramelo" | Ozuna | |
| 20 July | "Caramelo" | Ozuna | |
| 27 July | "For Sale" | Carlos Vives and Alejandro Sanz | |
| 3 August | "For Sale" | Carlos Vives and Alejandro Sanz | |
| 10 August | "For Sale" | Carlos Vives and Alejandro Sanz | |
| 17 August | "Hawái" | Maluma | |
| 24 August | "Hawái" | Maluma | |
| 31 August | "Hawái" | Maluma | |
| 7 September | "Hawái" | Maluma | |
| 14 September | "Hawái" | Maluma | |
| 21 September | "Beso" | CNCO | |
| 28 September | "Hawái" | Maluma | |
| 5 October | "Hawái" | Maluma | |
| 12 October | "Hawái" | Maluma | |
| 19 October | "Desesperado (Voy a Tomar)" | Joey Montana with Greeicy and Cali y El Dandee | |
| 26 October | "Mi Niña" | Wisin and Myke Towers | |
| 2 November | "Mi Niña" | Wisin and Myke Towers | |
| 9 November | "Mi Niña" | Wisin and Myke Towers | |
| 16 November | "Hawái" | Maluma featuring The Weeknd | |
| 23 November | "Hawái" | Maluma featuring The Weeknd | |
| 30 November | "Cumbiana" | Carlos Vives | |
| 7 December | "Cumbiana" | Carlos Vives | |
| 14 December | "Cumbiana" | Carlos Vives | |
| 21 December | "Cumbiana" | Carlos Vives | |
| 28 December | "Cumbiana" | Carlos Vives | |
