= List of number-one Anglo songs of 2016 (Panama) =

This is a list of the Anglo number-one songs of 2016 in Panama. The charts are published by Monitor Latino, based exclusively for English-language songs on airplay across radio stations in Panama using the Radio Tracking Data, LLC in real time. The chart week runs from Monday to Sunday.

== Chart history ==
Issue date	Song	Artist	Reference
5 December	"One Dance"	Drake featuring Wizkid and Kyla	
12 December	"Let Me Love You"	DJ Snake featuring Justin Bieber	
19 December	"One Dance"	Drake featuring Wizkid and Kyla	
26 December	"Work"	Rihanna featuring Drake	
