= List of number-one songs of 2016 (Panama) =

This is a list of the number-one songs of 2016 in Panama. The charts are published by Monitor Latino, based on airplay across radio stations in Panama using the Radio Tracking Data, LLC in real time. The chart week runs from Monday to Sunday.

Monitor Latino started monitoring radio stations in Mexico and the United States in 2003, and since then, the company expanded into other Latin American markets, and currently it monitors radio stations and issues music charts for 18 countries, including Panama.

The first weekly chart issue was dated December 5, 2016, with "Safari" by J Balvin featuring Pharrell Williams, Bia and Sky, debuting at number one and spending four consecutive weeks atop the chart, becoming their first number-one song ever in Panama.

== Chart history ==
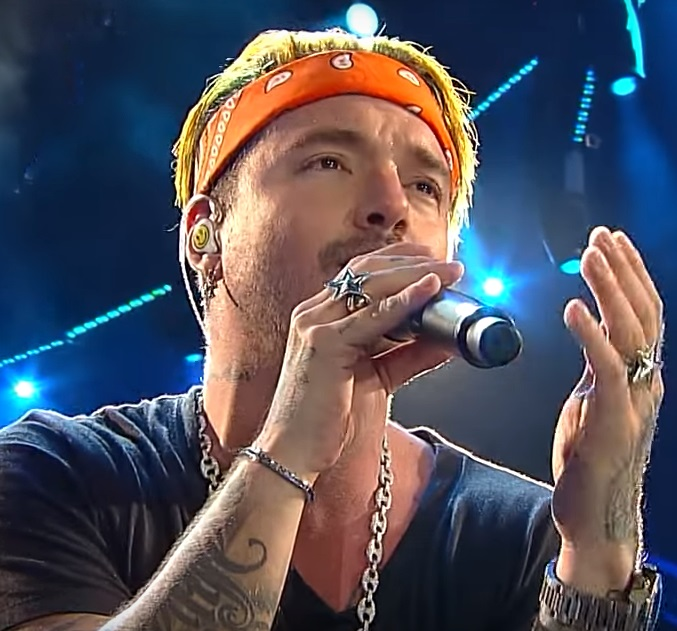
J Balvin (pictured), Pharrell Williams, Bia and Sky became the first artists in history to debut a song at number-one song in Panama.

Issue date	Song	Artist	Reference
5 December	"Safari"	J Balvin featuring Pharrell Williams, Bia and Sky	
12 December	"Safari"	J Balvin featuring Pharrell Williams, Bia and Sky	
19 December	"Safari"	J Balvin featuring Pharrell Williams, Bia and Sky	
26 December	"Safari"	J Balvin featuring Pharrell Williams, Bia and Sky	
