= Mitama =

Spirit of a kami or the soul of a dead person

The Japanese word mitama (御魂・御霊・神霊; 'honorable spirit') refers to the spirit of a kami or the soul of a dead person. It is composed of two characters, the first of which, mi (御; honorable), is simply an honorific. The second, tama (魂・霊) means "spirit". The character pair 神霊, also read mitama, is used exclusively to refer to a kami's spirit. Significantly, the term mitamashiro (御魂代; 'mitama representative') is a synonym of shintai, the object which in a Shinto shrine houses the enshrined kami.

Early Japanese definitions of the mitama, developed later by many thinkers like Motoori Norinaga, maintain it consists of several "spirits", relatively independent one from the other. The most developed is the ichirei shikon (一霊四魂), a Shinto theory according to which the spirit (霊魂, reikon) of both kami and human beings consists of one whole spirit and four sub spirits. The four sub-spirits are the ara-mitama (荒御霊・荒御魂; Wild Spirit), the nigi-mitama (和御霊・和御魂; Gentle Spirit), the saki-mitama (幸御魂; Happy Spirit) and the kushi-mitama (奇御霊・奇御魂; Wondrous Spirit).

According to the theory, each of the sub-spirits making up the spirit has a character and a function of its own; they all exist at the same time, complementing each other. In the Nihon Shoki, the deity Ōnamuchi (Ōkuninushi) actually meets his kushi-mitama and saki-mitama in the form of Ōmononushi, but does not even recognize them. The four seem moreover to have a different importance, and different thinkers have described their interaction differently.

== Ara-mitama and nigi-mitama ==
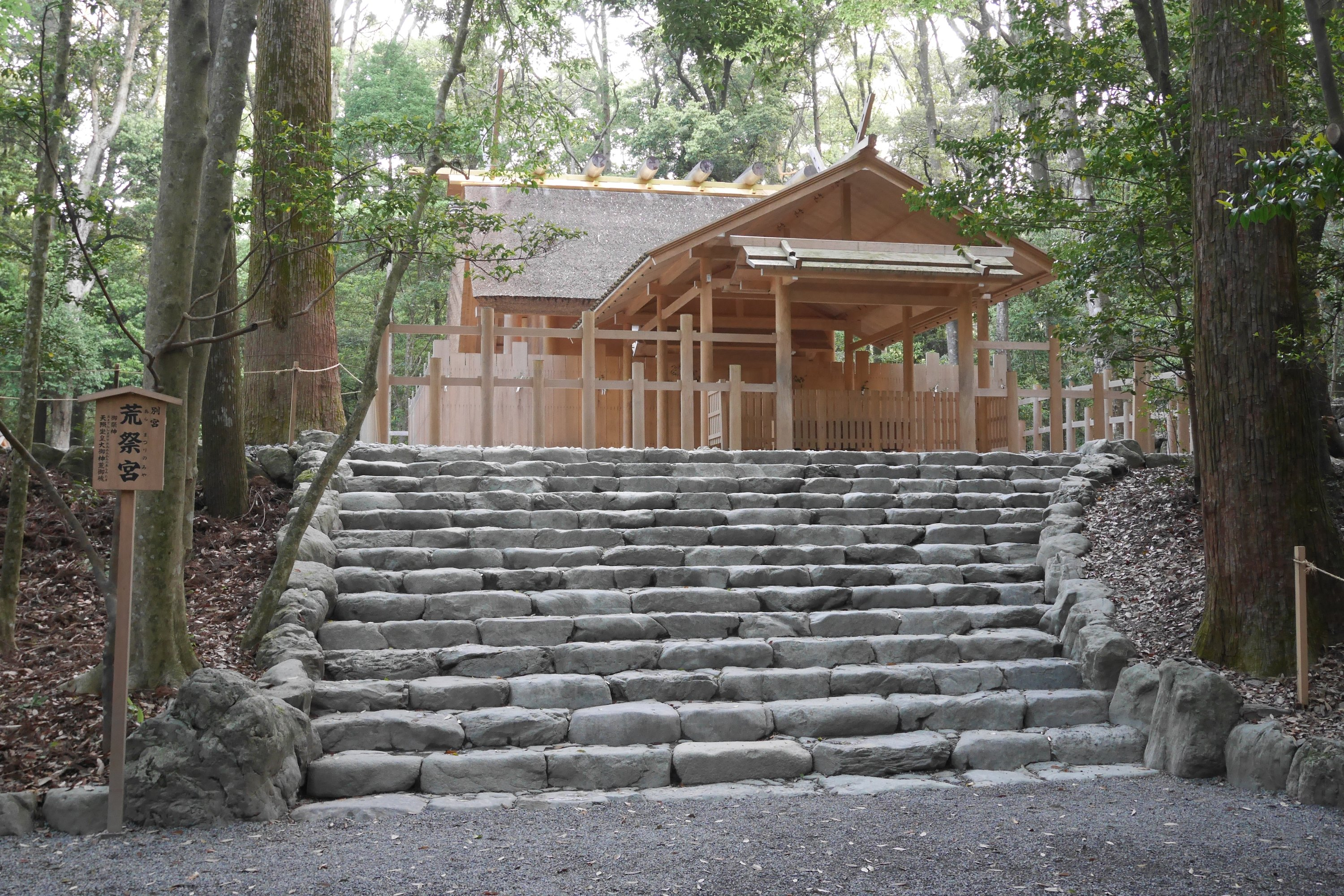
Ise Shrine's Aramatsuri-no-miya is said to enshrine Amaterasu's ara-mitama.

The Ara-Mitama (荒魂; lit. 'Wild/Rampageous Spirit') is the dynamic or rough and violent side of a spirit. A kami's first appearance is as an ara-mitama, which must be pacified with appropriate pacification rites and worship so that the nigi-mitama can appear.

The Nigi-Mitama (和魂; lit. 'Harmonious/Gentle Spirit') is the static side of a kami, while the ara-mitama appears in times of peril. These two sub-spirits are usually considered opposites, and Motoori Norinaga believed the other two to be no more than aspects of the nigi-mitama.

Ara-mitama and nigi-mitama are in any case independent agents, so much so that they can sometimes be enshrined separately in different locations and different shintai. For example, Sumiyoshi Shrine in Shimonoseki enshrines the ara-mitama of the Sumiyoshi kami, while Sumiyoshi Taisha in Osaka enshrines its nigi-mitama. Ise Shrine has a sub-shrine called Aramatsuri-no-miya enshrining Amaterasu's ara-mitama. Atsuta-jingū has a sessha called Ichi-no-misaki Jinja for her ara-mitama and a massha called Toosu-no-yashiro for her nigi-mitama. No separate enshrinement of the mitama of a kami has taken place since the rationalization and systematization of Shinto actuated by the Meiji Restoration.

== Saki-mitama ==
The Saki-Mitama (幸魂; lit. 'Happy/Lucky Spirit') - The happy and loving side of a whole, complete spirit (mitama); this is the spirit of blessing and prosperity. In a scene of the Nihon Shoki, kami Ōnamuchi is described in conversation with his own saki-mitama and kushi-mitama. Within Shinto also exists the idea that this the spirit which brings good harvests and catches. Motoori Norinaga and others however believe this to be no more than a function of the nigi-mitama.

== Kushi-mitama ==
The Kushi-mitama (奇魂; lit. 'Miraculous/Wondrous Spirit') is the wise and experienced side of a whole, complete spirit (mitama); the "wondrous spirit" which appears together with the saki-mitama, the Happy Spirit, which is the power behind the harvest. It is believed to have mysterious powers, to cause transformations and to be able to cure illnesses.

== Mitama Festival ==
A widely celebrated Shinto festival to the dead in Japan, particularly at the Yasukuni Shrine. Typically in mid-July.

== See also ==
- Chinkon
- Obon
- Reikon
- Honda Chikaatsu § Theorems of the Great Three
