= List of airplay number-one singles of 2021 (Uruguay) =

Singles chart Monitor Latino ranks the songs which received the most airplay per week on radio station in Latin America, including Uruguay, since 2017. In 2021, 15 songs managed to top the chart, while "Todo de Ti", by Rauw Alejandro, was the best-performing track of the year.

== Chart history ==
List of number-one singles
Issue date	Song	Artist(s)	Ref.
4 January	"Malditos Celos"	Ache featuring Anonimus	
11 January	"No Me Busques"	Yas Gagliardi	
18 January	"Malditos Celos"	Ache featuring Anonimus	
25 January	"Malditos Celos"	Ache featuring Anonimus	
1 February	"Malditos Celos"	Ache featuring Anonimus	
8 February	"Malditos Celos"	Ache featuring Anonimus	
15 February	"Malditos Celos"	Ache featuring Anonimus	
22 February	"Malditos Celos"	Ache featuring Anonimus	
1 March	"Malditos Celos"	Ache featuring Anonimus	
8 March	"Ropa Cara"	Camilo	
15 March	"Ropa Cara"	Camilo	
22 March	"Lo Primero"	Yas Gagliardi	
29 March	"Lo Primero"	Yas Gagliardi	
5 April	"AM"	Nio García	
12 April	"AM"	Nio García	
19 April	"AM"	Nio García	
26 April	"AM"	Nio García	
3 May	"AM"	Nio García	
10 May	"Miénteme"	Tini featuring María Becerra	
17 May	"Miénteme"	Tini featuring María Becerra	
24 May	"Miénteme"	Tini featuring María Becerra	
31 May	"Miénteme"	Tini featuring María Becerra	
7 June	"Miénteme"	Tini featuring María Becerra	
14 June	"Todo de Ti"	Rauw Alejandro	
21 June	"Pikete"	Nicky Jam featuring El Alfa	
28 June	"Dancefreak"	Domino Saints	
5 July	"Dancefreak"	Domino Saints	
12 July	"Todo de Ti"	Rauw Alejandro	
19 July	"Todo de Ti"	Rauw Alejandro	
26 July	"Todo de Ti"	Rauw Alejandro	
2 August	"Dancefreak"	Domino Saints	
9 August	"Todo de Ti"	Rauw Alejandro	
16 August	"Tus Poses"	Nio García	
23 August	"Tus Poses"	Nio García	
30 August	"Sobrio"	Maluma	
6 September	"Sobrio"	Maluma	
13 September	"Hielo"	Juan Y Rafa featuring Daneon	
20 September	"Darte"	Casper Magico featuring Nio García and Zion & Lennox	
27 September	"Darte"	Casper Magico featuring Nio García and Zion & Lennox	
4 October	"Sobrio"	Maluma	
11 October	"Sobrio"	Maluma	
18 October	"Impostora"	Vi Em	
25 October	"Sobrio"	Maluma	
1 November	"Sobrio"	Maluma	
8 November	"Hielo"	Juan Y Rafa featuring Daneon	
15 November	"Hielo"	Juan Y Rafa featuring Daneon	
22 November	"Impostora"	Vi Em	
29 November	"Impostora"	Vi Em	
6 December	"Tacones Rojos" (remix)	Sebastián Yatra featuring John Legend	
13 December	"Tacones Rojos" (remix)	Sebastián Yatra featuring John Legend	
20 December	"Tacones Rojos" (remix)	Sebastián Yatra featuring John Legend	
27 December	"Tacones Rojos" (remix)	Sebastián Yatra featuring John Legend	

== Number-one artists ==
List of number-one artists, with total weeks spent at number one shown
Position	Artist	Weeks at No. 1
1	Nio García	9
2	Ache	8
2	Anonimus	8
3	Maluma	6
4	Tini	5
4	María Becerra	5
4	Rauw Alejandro	5
5	Sebastián Yatra	4
5	John Legend	4
6	Yas Glagiardi	3
6	Domino Saints	3
6	Juan Y Rafa	3
6	Daneon	3
6	Vi Em	3
7	Camilo	2
7	Casper Magico	2
7	Zion & Lennox	2
8	Nicky Jam	1
8	El Alfa	1
