= List of airplay number-one singles of 2024 (Uruguay) =

Singles chart Monitor Latino ranks the songs which received the most airplay per week on radio station in Latin America, including Uruguay. In 2024, in that country, two songs have so far topped the chart.

== Chart history ==
List of number-one singles
Issue date	Song	Artist(s)	Ref.
1 January	"Baccarat"	Ozuna	
8 January	"La Morocha"	Luck Ra featuring BM	
15 January	"La Morocha"	Luck Ra featuring BM	
22 January	"La Morocha"	Luck Ra featuring BM	
29 January	"La Morocha"	Luck Ra featuring BM	
5 February	"La Morocha"	Luck Ra featuring BM	
12 February	"Hola Perdida"	Luck Ra featuring Khea	
19 February	"Hola Perdida"	Luck Ra featuring Khea	
26 February	"Hola Perdida"	Luck Ra featuring Khea	
4 March	"Hola Perdida"	Luck Ra featuring Khea	
11 March	"Hola Perdida"	Luck Ra featuring Khea	
18 March	"Hola Perdida"	Luck Ra featuring Khea	

== Number-one artists ==
List of number-one artists, with total weeks spent at number one shown
Position	Artist	Weeks at No. 1
1	Luck Ra	11
2	Khea	6
3	BM	5
4	Ozuna	1

== See also ==
- 2024 in music
