= List of airplay number-one singles of 2017 (Uruguay) =

Singles chart Monitor Latino ranks the songs which received the most airplay per week on radio station in Latin America, including Uruguay. Started in 2017, seven songs managed to top the chart that year.

== Chart history ==
List of number-one singles
Issue date	Song	Artist(s)	Ref.
6 February	"Chantaje"	Shakira featuring Maluma	
13 February	"Vente Pa' Ca"	Ricky Martin featuring Maluma	
20 February	"Vente Pa' Ca"	Ricky Martin featuring Maluma	
27 February	"La Bicicleta"	Carlos Vives featuring Shakira	
6 March	"Vente Pa' Ca"	Ricky Martin featuring Maluma	
13 March	"Despacito" (remix)	Luis Fonsi featuring Daddy Yankee and Justin Bieber	
20 March	"Despacito" (remix)	Luis Fonsi featuring Daddy Yankee and Justin Bieber	
27 March	"Despacito" (remix)	Luis Fonsi featuring Daddy Yankee and Justin Bieber	
3 April	"Chantaje"	Shakira featuring Maluma	
10 April	"Despacito" (remix)	Luis Fonsi featuring Daddy Yankee and Justin Bieber	
17 April	"Despacito" (remix)	Luis Fonsi featuring Daddy Yankee and Justin Bieber	
24 April	"Despacito" (remix)	Luis Fonsi featuring Daddy Yankee and Justin Bieber	
1 May	"Despacito" (remix)	Luis Fonsi featuring Daddy Yankee and Justin Bieber	
8 May	"Despacito" (remix)	Luis Fonsi featuring Daddy Yankee and Justin Bieber	
15 May	"Despacito" (remix)	Luis Fonsi featuring Daddy Yankee and Justin Bieber	
22 May	"Despacito" (remix)	Luis Fonsi featuring Daddy Yankee and Justin Bieber	
29 May	"Despacito" (remix)	Luis Fonsi featuring Daddy Yankee and Justin Bieber	
5 June	"Despacito" (remix)	Luis Fonsi featuring Daddy Yankee and Justin Bieber	
12 June	"Despacito" (remix)	Luis Fonsi featuring Daddy Yankee and Justin Bieber	
19 June	"Despacito" (remix)	Luis Fonsi featuring Daddy Yankee and Justin Bieber	
26 June	"Despacito" (remix)	Luis Fonsi featuring Daddy Yankee and Justin Bieber	
3 July	"Despacito" (remix)	Luis Fonsi featuring Daddy Yankee and Justin Bieber	
10 July	"Despacito" (remix)	Luis Fonsi featuring Daddy Yankee and Justin Bieber	
17 July	"Despacito" (remix)	Luis Fonsi featuring Daddy Yankee and Justin Bieber	
24 July	"Despacito" (remix)	Luis Fonsi featuring Daddy Yankee and Justin Bieber	
31 July	"Despacito" (remix)	Luis Fonsi featuring Daddy Yankee and Justin Bieber	
7 August	"Despacito" (remix)	Luis Fonsi featuring Daddy Yankee and Justin Bieber	
14 August	"Despacito" (remix)	Luis Fonsi featuring Daddy Yankee and Justin Bieber	
21 August	"Despacito" (remix)	Luis Fonsi featuring Daddy Yankee and Justin Bieber	
28 August	"Mi Gente" (remix)	J Balvin featuring Beyoncé and Willy William	
4 September	"Mi Gente" (remix)	J Balvin featuring Beyoncé and Willy William	
11 September	"Mi Gente" (remix)	J Balvin featuring Beyoncé and Willy William	
18 September	"Mi Gente" (remix)	J Balvin featuring Beyoncé and Willy William	
25 September	"Mi Gente" (remix)	J Balvin featuring Beyoncé and Willy William	
2 October	"Mi Gente" (remix)	J Balvin featuring Beyoncé and Willy William	
9 October	"Mi Gente" (remix)	J Balvin featuring Beyoncé and Willy William	
16 October	"Mi Gente" (remix)	J Balvin featuring Beyoncé and Willy William	
23 October	"Mi Gente" (remix)	J Balvin featuring Beyoncé and Willy William	
30 October	"Mi Gente" (remix)	J Balvin featuring Beyoncé and Willy William	
6 November	"Mi Gente" (remix)	J Balvin featuring Beyoncé and Willy William	
13 November	"Mi Gente" (remix)	J Balvin featuring Beyoncé and Willy William	
20 November	"Mi Gente" (remix)	J Balvin featuring Beyoncé and Willy William	
27 November	"Mi Gente" (remix)	J Balvin featuring Beyoncé and Willy William	
4 December	"Mi Gente" (remix)	J Balvin featuring Beyoncé and Willy William	
11 December	"Mi Gente" (remix)	J Balvin featuring Beyoncé and Willy William	
18 December	"Échame la Culpa"	Luis Fonsi featuring Demi Lovato	
25 December	"Corazón"	Maluma featuring Nego do Borel	

== Number-one artists ==
List of number-one artists, with total weeks spent at number one shown
Position	Artist	Weeks at No. 1
1	Luis Fonsi	24
2	Daddy Yankee	23
2	Justin Bieber	23
3	J Balvin	16
3	Beyoncé	16
3	Willy William	16
4	Maluma	6
5	Shakira	3
5	Ricky Martin	3
6	Carlos Vives	1
6	Demi Lovato	1
6	Nego do Borel	1
