= Monitor Latino =

Singles chart in Mexico

- Industry: Music
- Founded: 2003
- Headquarters: Los Angeles, United States
- Key people: Juan Carlos Hidalgo, Juan Carlos Ortíz, Felix García, Antonio García
- Products: Music monitoring system
- Website: www.monitorlatino.com

Monitor Latino (stylised monitorLATINO) is a singles chart founded in 2003 which ranks songs on chart based on airplay across radio stations in Latin American countries and Hispanic radio stations in the United States using the Radio Tracking Data, LLC in real time.

Monitor Latino started monitoring radio stations in Mexico and the United States in 2003. The company later expanded into other Latin American markets, and currently it monitors radio stations and issues music charts for 18 countries.

In January 2012, Monitor Latino began surveying radio stations in the Dominican Republic, Colombia, Ecuador, Venezuela, and Guatemala, publishing singles chart which were only accessible to subscribers. Since 2016, their complete charts are accessible to the general public, and an archive for their weekly charts after July 2014 is available on their website.

Monitor Latino hosts an annual award show which is held in Los Angeles, California. The company has its offices in Los Angeles and in Guadalajara, Mexico.

== Number-one songs ==
=== Argentina ===
- 2016 – present

=== Bolivia ===
- 2016
- 2017
- 2018
- 2019
- 2020
- 2021

=== Chile ===
- 2021

=== Colombia ===
- 2018

=== Guatemala ===
- 2018

=== Mexico ===
- 2002-2007
- 2008
- 2009
- 2010
- 2011
- 2012
- 2013
- 2014
- 2015
- 2016
- 2017
- 2018
- 2019
- 2020
- 2021

=== Panama ===
- 2016 (English-language songs)
- 2017 (English-language songs)
- 2018
- 2019
- 2020
- 2021 (English-language songs)

=== Puerto Rico ===
- 2020

=== Uruguay ===
- 2017
- 2018
- 2019
- 2020
- 2021
- 2022
- 2023
- 2024

=== Venezuela ===
- 2018

== Year-end charts ==
=== Latin America ===
In 2017, Monitor Latino introduced a general year-end chart for the 100 most-played songs in radio stations across Latin America. The first year-end chart measured data from 15 countries, a figure that increased to 19 as of 2019.

==== 2017 ====
Rank	Single	Artist(s)	Spins
1	"Despacito"	Luis Fonsi and Daddy Yankee featuring Justin Bieber	580,450
2	"Felices Los 4"	Maluma	370,990
3	"Mi Gente"	J Balvin and Willy William featuring Beyoncé	338,240
4	"El Amante"	Nicky Jam	308,320
5	"Shape of You"	Ed Sheeran	266,540
6	"Súbeme La Radio"	Enrique Iglesias featuring Descemer Bueno and Zion & Lennox	261,980
7	"Adiós Amor"	Christian Nodal	254,750
8	"Chantaje"	Shakira featuring Maluma	252,250
9	"Sigo Extrañándote"	J Balvin	245,910
10	"Escápate Conmigo"	Wisin featuring Ozuna	245,130

==== 2018 ====
Rank	Single	Artist(s)	Spins
1	"Dura"	Daddy Yankee	389,830
2	"X"	Nicky Jam and J Balvin	372,090
3	"Me Niego"	Reik featuring Ozuna and Wisin	363,350
4	"Échame la Culpa"	Luis Fonsi and Demi Lovato	324,050
5	"Bella"	Wolfine featuring Maluma	303,300
6	"Corazón"	Maluma featuring Nego do Borel	285,420
7	"No Es Justo"	J Balvin featuring Zion & Lennox	230,010
8	"Déjala Que Vuelva"	Piso 21 featuring Manuel Turizo	218,030
9	"Havana"	Camila Cabello featuring Young Thug	214,780
10	"Sin Pijama"	Becky G and Natti Natasha	207,620

==== 2019 ====
Rank	Single	Artist(s)	Spins
1	"Con Calma"	Daddy Yankee featuring Snow	462,880
2	"Calma"	Pedro Capó and Farruko	435,260
3	"Otro Trago"	Sech featuring Darell	254,160
4	"Un Año"	Sebastián Yatra featuring Reik	242,210
5	"Mía"	Bad Bunny featuring Drake	235,300
6	"Soltera"	Lunay featuring Daddy Yankee and Bad Bunny	234,200
7	"A Través del Vaso"	Banda Los Sebastianes	225,330
8	"Taki Taki"	DJ Snake featuring Selena Gomez, Ozuna, and Cardi B	223,640
9	"Te Vi"	Piso 21 featuring Micro TDH	219,840
10	"Con Altura"	Rosalía and J Balvin featuring El Guincho	214,320

=== Mexico ===
- 2008
- 2009
- 2010
- 2011
- 2012
- 2013
- 2014
- 2015
- 2016
- 2017
- 2018

== Charts by country ==
Monitor Latino provides a total of seventy-four Airplay charts, distributed in nineteen countries, three regions and sixteen music genres.

=== Argentina ===
- Top 20 General
- Top 20 Nacional
- Top 20 Latino
- Top 20 Anglo

=== Bolivia ===
- Top 20 General
- Top 20 Anglo
- Top 20 Latino

=== Central America ===
- Top 20 General
- Top 20 Anglo
- Top 20 Latino

=== Chile ===
- Top 20 General
- Top 20 Nacionalidad
- Top 20 Pop
- Top 20 Urbano
- Top 20 Popular
- Top 20 Tropical
- Top 20 Anglo

=== Colombia ===
- Top 20 General
- Top 20 Vallenato
- Top 20 Crossover
- Top 20 Pop
- Top 20 Tropical
- Top 20 Urbano
- Top 20 Popular
- Top 20 Anglo

=== Costa Rica ===
- Top 20 General
- Top 20 Urbano
- Top 20 Anglo

=== Dominican Republic ===
- Top 20 General
- Top 20 Bachata
- Top 20 Merengue
- Top 20 Salsa
- Top 20 Urbano
- Top 20 Pop
- Top 20 Anglo

=== Ecuador ===
- Top 20 General
- Top 20 Nacionalidad
- Top 20 Latino
- Top 20 Pop
- Top 20 Urbano
- Top 20 Tropical
- Top 20 Anglo

=== El Salvador ===
- Top 20 General
- Top 20 Pop
- Top 20 Anglo

=== Guatemala ===
- Top 20 General
- Top 20 Pop
- Top 20 Regional Mexicano
- Top 20 Anglo

=== Honduras ===
- Top 20 General
- Top 20 Pop
- Top 20 Urbano
- Top 20 Anglo

=== Latin America ===
- Top 20 Anglo
- Top 20 Popular
- Top 20 Latino
- Top 20 Tropical

=== Mexico ===
- Top 20 General
- Top 20 Pop
- Top 20 Popular
- Top 20 Anglo

=== Nicaragua ===
- Top 20 General
- Top 20 Pop
- Top 20 Urbano
- Top 20 Anglo

=== Panama ===
- Top 20 General
- Top 20 Pop
- Top 20 Latino
- Top 20 Urbano
- Top 20 Tropical
- Top 20 Anglo

=== Paraguay ===
- Top 20 General
- Top 20 Pop
- Top 20 Urbano
- Top 20 Anglo

=== Peru ===
- Top 20 General
- Top 20 Pop
- Top 20 Urbano
- Top 20 Popular
- Top 20 Tropical
- Top 20 Anglo

=== Puerto Rico ===
- Top 20 General
- Top 20 Pop
- Top 20 Anglo
- Top 20 Urbano

=== Spain ===
- Top 20 General
- Top 20 Anglo
- Top 20 Latino

=== United States ===
- Top 20 Mainstream
- Top 20 Regional Mexicano
- Top 20 Pop Rhythmic
- Top 20 Tropical
- Top 20 Anglo
- Top 20 Oldies

=== Uruguay ===
- Top 20 General
- Top 20 Anglo
- Top 20 Latino

=== Venezuela ===
- Top 20 General
- Top 20 Nacionalidad
- Top 20 Latino
- Top 20 Pop
- Top 20 Anglo
- Top 20 Urbano
- Top 20 Tradicional
- Top 20 Tropical
- Top 20 Vallenato

== Other charts ==
=== Cristiano ===
- Top 20 General

== See also ==
- Top 100 Mexico
