= List of airplay number-one singles of 2018 (Uruguay) =

Singles chart Monitor Latino ranks the songs which received the most airplay per week on radio station in Latin America, including Uruguay. In 2018, ten songs managed to top the chart, while "A Partir de Hoy", by David Bisbal and Sebastián Yatra, was the best-performing track of the year.

== Chart history ==
List of number-one singles
Issue date	Song	Artist(s)	Ref.
1 January	"Corazón"	Maluma featuring Nego do Borel	
8 January	"Corazón"	Maluma featuring Nego do Borel	
15 January	"Corazón"	Maluma featuring Nego do Borel	
22 January	"Échame la Culpa"	Luis Fonsi featuring Demi Lovato	
29 January	"Échame la Culpa"	Luis Fonsi featuring Demi Lovato	
5 February	"Échame la Culpa"	Luis Fonsi featuring Demi Lovato	
12 February	"Como Tú"	Luciano Pereyra	
19 February	"Como Tú"	Luciano Pereyra	
26 February	"Como Tú"	Luciano Pereyra	
5 March	"Como Tú"	Luciano Pereyra	
12 March	"Como Tú"	Luciano Pereyra	
19 March	"Como Tú"	Luciano Pereyra	
26 March	"Como Tú"	Luciano Pereyra	
2 April	"Como Tú"	Luciano Pereyra	
9 April	"Como Tú"	Luciano Pereyra	
16 April	"Échame la Culpa"	Luis Fonsi featuring Demi Lovato	
23 April	"Como Tú"	Luciano Pereyra	
30 April	"Como Tú"	Luciano Pereyra	
7 May	"A Partir de Hoy"	David Bisbal featuring Sebastián Yatra	
14 May	"A Partir de Hoy"	David Bisbal featuring Sebastián Yatra	
21 May	"A Partir de Hoy"	David Bisbal featuring Sebastián Yatra	
28 May	"A Partir de Hoy"	David Bisbal featuring Sebastián Yatra	
4 June	"A Partir de Hoy"	David Bisbal featuring Sebastián Yatra	
11 June	"A Partir de Hoy"	David Bisbal featuring Sebastián Yatra	
18 June	"A Partir de Hoy"	David Bisbal featuring Sebastián Yatra	
25 June	"A Partir de Hoy"	David Bisbal featuring Sebastián Yatra	
2 July	"A Partir de Hoy"	David Bisbal featuring Sebastián Yatra	
9 July	"A Partir de Hoy"	David Bisbal featuring Sebastián Yatra	
16 July	"A Partir de Hoy"	David Bisbal featuring Sebastián Yatra	
23 July	"A Partir de Hoy"	David Bisbal featuring Sebastián Yatra	
30 July	"A Partir de Hoy"	David Bisbal featuring Sebastián Yatra	
6 August	"A Partir de Hoy"	David Bisbal featuring Sebastián Yatra	
13 August	"No Me Acuerdo"	Thalía featuring Natti Natasha	
20 August	"A Partir de Hoy"	David Bisbal featuring Sebastián Yatra	
27 August	"Clandestino"	Shakira featuring Maluma	
3 September	"Clandestino"	Shakira featuring Maluma	
10 September	"Amigos Con Derechos"	Reik featuring Maluma	
17 September	"Amigos Con Derechos"	Reik featuring Maluma	
24 September	"Amigos Con Derechos"	Reik featuring Maluma	
1 October	"Amigos Con Derechos"	Reik featuring Maluma	
8 October	"Amigos Con Derechos"	Reik featuring Maluma	
15 October	"Amarte No Se Olvida"	Luana Persíncula	
22 October	"Amarte No Se Olvida"	Luana Persíncula	
29 October	"Amigos Con Derechos"	Reik featuring Maluma	
5 November	"Amigos Con Derechos"	Reik featuring Maluma	
12 November	"Amigos Con Derechos"	Reik featuring Maluma	
19 November	"Amigos Con Derechos"	Reik featuring Maluma	
26 November	"Amigos Con Derechos"	Reik featuring Maluma	
3 December	"Amigos Con Derechos"	Reik featuring Maluma	
10 December	"Si Ya Te Olvidé"	Luciana	
17 December	"Si Ya Te Olvidé"	Luciana	
24 December	"Me Voy" (remix)	Rombai featuring Abraham Mateo and Reykon	
31 December	"Si Ya Te Olvidé"	Luciana	

== Number-one artists ==
List of number-one artists, with total weeks spent at number one shown
Position	Artist	Weeks at No. 1
1	Maluma	16
2	David Bisbal	15
2	Sebastián Yatra	15
3	Luciano Pereyra	11
3	Reik	11
4	Luis Fonsi	4
4	Demi Lovato	4
5	Nego do Borel	3
5	Luciana	3
6	Shakira	2
6	Luana Persíncula	2
7	Thalía	1
7	Natti Natasha	1
7	Rombai	1
7	Abraham Mateo	1
7	Reykon	1
