= Mike Bahía =

Colombian singer

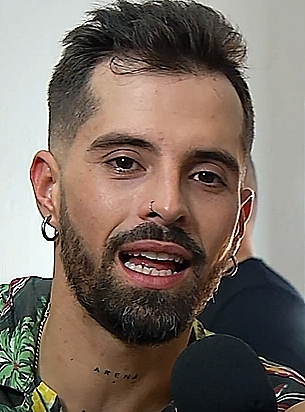
- Bahía in 2019

Background information
- Born: Michael Egred Mejía; 27 June 1987 (age 39); Cali, Colombia
- Genres: Reggaeton; Urban; Pop; Reggae
- Occupation: Singer-songwriter
- Years active: 2013–present

Michael Egred Mejía (born 27 June 1987 in Cali, Colombia), better known as Mike Bahía, is a Colombian singer and enterprise administrator. He is best known for his songs "Estar Contigo", "Buscándote", "La Muñeca", and his most recent collaboration "Amantes", with Greeicy Rendón.

== Career ==
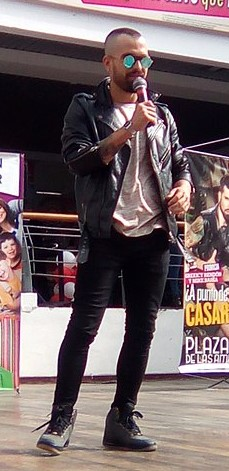
Bahía in 2017

Bahía has played guitar since he was 8 years old. He did a university degree in business administration, but does not currently exercise that title. He began his career in 2013 in the reality show La Voz Colombia (The voice Colombia) performing the song "This Love" by Maroon 5, and was selected for the first stage of the program as part of the Fanny Lu team. Later it was eliminated in the second stage of the program. During that time, he was part of Capzula, a rock band from Cali, where he worked as a vocalist performing songs as "Punto y Aparte" and "Lo Dejamos Así". In this group he was for almost seven years, until in 2014 he decided to leave he and continue his path as a soloist. In 2015, he released his first song "Buscándote", produced by Montana "The Producer", Ronny Watts and Juan Jhail. This single made it known not only in Colombia, but internationally, and marked the beginning of a great musical career. Later, he released the songs "Estar Contigo", "Tarde", and "La Muñeca", which became the most listened to on all radio and television programs dedicated to music nationwide.

In 2017, he released his first album entitled "Yo Soy", which he promoted with his single "Déjame". The album was produced by Grammy winner, Sky. Other of the singles that are part of the album is "Una Noche en Hawaii", which he performed with the Bolivian singer Bonny Lovy. And "Alguien Me Dijo" produced by Maffio and with the participation of Jamaican artist Red Rat. However, it was with the single "Amantes", in which he collaborated with Greeicy Rendón, with which he stood out. The single since its launch lasted 6 weeks in the number one spot on the National-Report charts. On television he has been guest stars in television series as The Girl (2016), and Francisco el matemático: Clase 2017 where he also composed the main theme song of the series. Later, in 2018, he participated in the reality show Mira quién baila as a competitor.

In 2021 and 2022, the Recording Industry Association of America (RIAA) certified five of his Bahía's singles. "Cuenta Conmigo" (with Llane and PJ Sin Suela, featuring Mozart La Para), "La Lá" (featuring Ovy on the Drums) and "Serenata" were certified Disco De Oro, while "Detente" (featuring Danny Ocean) and "Esta Noche" (with Greeicy) were featured "Disco De Platino".

== Awards and nominations ==
Year	Award	Category	Work	Result
2019	2019 Heat Latin Music Awards	Best Andean Artist	Himself	Won
2020	Latin Grammy Awards	Best New Artist	Himself	Won
2023	Latin Grammy Awards	Best Contemporary Tropical Album	Contigo	Pending
