= List of airplay number-one singles of 2023 (Uruguay) =

Singles chart Monitor Latino ranks the songs which received the most airplay per week on radio station in Latin America, including Uruguay, since 2017. In 2023, 11 songs managed to top the chart, while "Shakira: Bzrp Music Sessions, Vol. 53", by Bizarrap and Shakira, was the best-performing track of the year.

== Chart history ==
List of number-one singles
Issue date	Song	Artist(s)	Ref.
2 January	"La Bachata"	Manuel Turizo	
9 January	"Chao Bebe"	Ovy On The Drums featuring Ozuna	
16 January	"Chao Bebe"	Ovy On The Drums featuring Ozuna	
23 January	"Chao Bebe"	Ovy On The Drums featuring Ozuna	
30 January	"Chao Bebe"	Ovy On The Drums featuring Ozuna	
6 February	"Shakira: Bzrp Music Sessions, Vol. 53"	Bizarrap featuring Shakira	
13 February	"Shakira: Bzrp Music Sessions, Vol. 53"	Bizarrap featuring Shakira	
20 February	"Shakira: Bzrp Music Sessions, Vol. 53"	Bizarrap featuring Shakira	
27 February	"La Bachata"	Manuel Turizo	
6 March	"Shakira: Bzrp Music Sessions, Vol. 53"	Bizarrap featuring Shakira	
13 March	"Shakira: Bzrp Music Sessions, Vol. 53"	Bizarrap featuring Shakira	
20 March	"Shakira: Bzrp Music Sessions, Vol. 53"	Bizarrap featuring Shakira	
27 March	"TQG"	Karol G featuring Shakira	
3 April	"Shakira: Bzrp Music Sessions, Vol. 53"	Bizarrap featuring Shakira	
10 April	"TQG"	Karol G featuring Shakira	
17 April	"Shakira: Bzrp Music Sessions, Vol. 53"	Bizarrap featuring Shakira	
24 April	"Shakira: Bzrp Music Sessions, Vol. 53"	Bizarrap featuring Shakira	
1 May	"TQG"	Karol G featuring Shakira	
8 May	"TQG"	Karol G featuring Shakira	
15 May	"TQG"	Karol G featuring Shakira	
22 May	"El Merengue"	Marshmello featuring Manuel Turizo	
29 May	"El Merengue"	Marshmello featuring Manuel Turizo	
5 June	"El Merengue"	Marshmello featuring Manuel Turizo	
12 June	"El Merengue"	Marshmello featuring Manuel Turizo	
19 June	"Los del Espacio"	Los del Espacio (Note: Supergroup formed by Lit Killah, Tiago PZK, María Becerra, Duki, Emilia, Rusherking, FMK, and Big One.)	
26 June	"Frágil"	Yahritza y Su Esencia featuring Grupo Frontera	
3 July	"Me Enteré"	Tiago PZK featuring Tini	
10 July	"Me Enteré"	Tiago PZK featuring Tini	
17 July	"Los del Espacio"	Los del Espacio	
24 July	"Los del Espacio"	Los del Espacio	
31 July	"Los del Espacio"	Los del Espacio	
7 August	"Me Enteré"	Tiago PZK featuring Tini	
14 August	"Me Enteré"	Tiago PZK featuring Tini	
21 August	"Me Enteré"	Tiago PZK featuring Tini	
28 August	"Me Enteré"	Tiago PZK featuring Tini	
4 September	"Me Enteré"	Tiago PZK featuring Tini	
11 September	"Los del Espacio"	Los del Espacio	
18 September	"Los del Espacio"	Los del Espacio	
25 September	"Los del Espacio"	Los del Espacio	
2 October	"Los del Espacio"	Los del Espacio	
9 October	"Los del Espacio"	Los del Espacio	
16 October	"Los del Espacio"	Los del Espacio	
23 October	"Los del Espacio"	Los del Espacio	
30 October	"La Morocha"	Luck Ra featuring BM	
6 November	"La Morocha"	Luck Ra featuring BM	
13 November	"Columbia"	Quevedo	
20 November	"Columbia"	Quevedo	
27 November	"La Morocha"	Luck Ra featuring BM	
4 December	"Baccarat"	Ozuna	
11 December	"Baccarat"	Ozuna	
18 December	"Baccarat"	Ozuna	
25 December	"Baccarat"	Ozuna	

== Number-one artists ==
List of number-one artists, with total weeks spent at number one shown
Position	Artist	Weeks at No. 1
1	Shakira	14
2	Los del Espacio	11
3	Bizarrap	9
4	Ozuna	8
5	Tiago PZK	7
5	Tini	7
6	Manuel Turizo	6
7	Karol G	5
8	Ovy On The Drums	4
8	Marshmello	4
9	Luck Ra	3
9	BM	3
10	Quevedo	2
11	Yahritza y Su Esencia	1
11	Grupo Frontera	1
