= List of number-one albums of 2015 (Mexico) =

Top 100 Mexico is a record chart published weekly by AMPROFON (Asociación Mexicana de Productores de Fonogramas y Videogramas), a non-profit organization composed by Mexican and multinational record companies. This association tracks record sales (physical and digital) in Mexico. Since May 2013, some positions of the chart are published in the official Twitter account of AMPROFON including the number one position.

== Chart history ==
The yellow background indicates the best-performing album of 2015.

Chart date	Album	Artist	Reference
January 4	Confidencias Reales	Alejandro Fernández	
January 11	Confidencias Reales	Alejandro Fernández	
January 18	Confidencias Reales	Alejandro Fernández	
January 25	Confidencias Reales	Alejandro Fernández	
February 1	Confidencias Reales	Alejandro Fernández	
February 8	Ojos en Blanco	La Arrolladora Banda El Limón	
February 15	Los Dúo	Juan Gabriel	
February 22	Los Dúo	Juan Gabriel	
March 1	Los Dúo	Juan Gabriel	
March 8	Los Dúo	Juan Gabriel	
March 15	Fifty Shades of Grey	Various artists	
March 22	Los Dúo	Juan Gabriel	
March 29	Hasta la Raíz	Natalia Lafourcade	
April 5	Los Dúo	Juan Gabriel	
April 12	Los Dúo	Juan Gabriel	
April 19	Who I AM	Abraham Mateo	
April 26	Los Dúo	Juan Gabriel	
May 3	Los Dúo	Juan Gabriel	
May 10	Los Dúo	Juan Gabriel	
May 17	Los Dúo	Juan Gabriel	
May 24	Los Dúo	Juan Gabriel	
May 31	Los Dúo	Juan Gabriel	
June 7	Hoy Más Fuerte	Gerardo Ortíz	
June 14	Drones	Muse	
June 21	Los Dúo	Juan Gabriel	
June 28	Los Dúo	Juan Gabriel	
July 9	Los Dúo	Juan Gabriel	
July 16	Los Dúo	Juan Gabriel	
July 23	Lo Esencial	Joan Sebastian	
July 30	Los Dúo	Juan Gabriel	
August 6	Los Dúo	Juan Gabriel	
August 13	Los Dúo	Juan Gabriel	
August 20	Los Dúo	Juan Gabriel	
August 27	El Amor	Gloria Trevi	
September 3	El Amor	Gloria Trevi	
September 10	The Book of Souls	Iron Maiden	
September 17	En Vivo	Kabah & OV7	
September 24	En Vivo	Kabah & OV7	
October 1	Dualidad	Reyno	
October 8	En Vivo	Kabah & OV7	
October 15	6	Yuridia	
October 22	En Vivo	Kabah & OV7	
October 29	En Vivo	Kabah & OV7	
November 5	8.11.14	Zoé	
November 12	Dèjá Vu	Jeans	
November 19	Made in the A.M.	One Direction	
November 26	25	Adele	
December 3	MTV Unplugged: El Libro De Las Mutaciones	Enrique Bunbury	
December 10	Los Dúo, Vol. 2	Juan Gabriel	
December 17	Los Dúo, Vol. 2	Juan Gabriel	
December 24	Los Dúo, Vol. 2	Juan Gabriel	
December 31	Los Dúo, Vol. 2	Juan Gabriel	
