= Tacones Rojos =

2021 single by Sebastián Yatra

Single by Sebastián Yatra

from the album Dharma
- Language: Spanish
- English title: "Red High Heels"
- Released: 22 October 2021
- Length: 3:09
- Label: Universal Latino
- Songwriters: Joan Josep Monserrat Riutort; Lofty; Manuel Lara; Pablo; Sebastián Obando Giraldo
- Producers: Manuel Lara; Juanjo Monserrat; Pablo María Rousselón

Sebastián Yatra singles chronology
"Tarde" (2021)	"Tacones Rojos" (2021)	"Amor Pasajero" (2022)

Music video
- "Tacones Rojos" on YouTube

"Tacones Rojos" (transl. "Red High Heels") is a song by Colombian singer Sebastián Yatra released as the eighth single from his third studio album, Dharma (2022), released through Universal Music Latino on 22 October 2021.

In Spain, the song was certified double platinum certification for sales equivalent to 120,000 units.

A bilingual duet remix with American singer John Legend was released on 23 March 2022.

== Promotion ==
=== Music video ===
A screenshot from the music video, which shows Yatra and a girl guests eating in a dining room.

The music video was published on 22 October 2021. It features Spanish actress Clara Galle.

=== Lyric video ===
The lyric video from the song was released on 29 October 2021.

== Other versions ==
=== Tacones Rojos with John Legend ===
"Tacones Rojos"

Single by Sebastián Yatra and John Legend

from the album Dharma +
- Language: Spanish; English
- English title: "Red High Heels"
- Released: 23 March 2022
- Recorded: 2021–2022
- Length: 3:09
- Label: Universal Music Latino
- Songwriters: John Legend; Manuel Lara; Joan Josep Monserrat Riutort; Sebastián Obando Giraldo; Manuel Lorente; Pablo Rousselón de Croisoeuil
- Producers: Manuel Lara; Joan Josep Monserrat Riutort; Pablo María Rousselón de Croisoeuil Chateaurenard

Sebastián Yatra singles chronology
"Érase Una Vez (Pero Ya No)" (2022)	"Tacones Rojos" (2022)	"Until She's Gone / Tu Luz Quedó" (2022)

John Legend singles chronology
"Tomorrow" (2022)	"Tacones Rojos" (2022)	"Free" (2022)

Music video
- "Tacones Rojos (with John Legend)" on YouTube

"Tacones Rojos with John Legend" is the bilingual version of the Colombian singer Sebastián Yatra, together with the American singer John Legend, released as a single on 23 March 2022.

==== Background and release ====
Through social networks, Yatra announced the release of his new remix "Tacones Rojos" with American singer-songwriter John Legend for 23 March 2022.

==== Music video ====
The official music video was released along with the single simultaneously on 23 March 2022.

In February, the single reached number one on Billboard's Latin Airplay chart.

=== Tacones Rojos (Tiësto Remix) ===
A remix by Dutch DJ and producer Tiësto of "Tacones Rojos" was released on 28 July 2022, along with the deluxe version of Sebastián Yatra's album Dharma +.

== Charts ==
Chart performance for "Tacones Rojos"
Chart (2022)	Peak position
Argentina Hot 100 (Billboard)	7
San Marino (SMRRTV Top 50)	24
Spain (Promusicae)	2
US Bubbling Under Hot 100 (Billboard)	21
US Hot Latin Songs (Billboard)	12
US Latin Pop Airplay (Billboard)	1

== Certifications ==
Certifications for "Tacones Rojos"
Region	Certification	Certified units/sales
Mexico (AMPROFON)	Gold	70,000^{‡}
Portugal (AFP)	Platinum	10,000^{‡}
Spain (Promusicae)	10× Platinum	600,000^{‡}
United States (RIAA)	12× Platinum (Latin)	720,000^{‡}
^{‡} Sales+streaming figures based on certification alone.
