= PJ Sin Suela =

Puerto Rican–American rapper and physician (born 1989)

- PJ Sin Suela at the 2026 Latin Grammy Awards

Background information
- Born: Pedro-Juan Vazquez Bragan; 5 August 1989 (age 37); The Bronx, New York City, U.S.
- Genres: Reggaeton; hip hop; Puerto Rican hip-hop; urbano

Pedro Juan Vázquez Bragan (born August 5, 1989), known professionally as PJ Sin Suela, is a Puerto Rican rapper and doctor. Born in The Bronx, New York City and raised in Ponce, Puerto Rico, he graduated from medical school in 2015 before pursuing a musical career. He is known for his socially-conscious lyrics and his collaboration with Bad Bunny and Ñejo on the single "Cual Es Tu Plan?" reached number 13 on the Billboard Hot Latin Songs chart in August 2018. The song also reached number 17 on the Billboard Latin Digital Song Sales chart. On May 1st 2025, PJ made his debut on NPR’s Tiny Desk Concerts series making history as the first artist to ever perform with an ASL interpreter. He is also a Latin Grammy Winner.

== Life and career ==
PJ Sin Suela was born in The Bronx borough of New York City on August 5, 1989, and raised in Ponce, Puerto Rico. He developed an interest in music from his mother, who played the guitar. He gained a reputation in high school for rapping for his classmates at lunch. He started his studies at the University of Mayagüez but later transferred to Villanova University where he received his BS in Science. He later graduated with an MD degree from medical school at Universidad Central del Caribe in 2015, after which he decided to pursue music as a career. He initially began performing with the plan of only doing so for a year, but noticed that the money he generated from his performances allowed him to pay his rent. He has since stated that after the success of his career, he "doesn't see himself in a hospital" but plans to give educational classes and lectures about medicine. However, he has since returned to the medical field due to the COVID-19 pandemic, working in the Hospital San Cristóbal in Ponce.

As his career was gaining traction, PJ Sin Suela took note of the crisis in his home country and provided medical assistance to Puerto Ricans after Hurricane Maria in 2017. In August 2018, his collaboration with Bad Bunny and Ñejo on the single "Cual Es Tu Plan?" reached number 13 on the Billboard Hot Latin Songs chart and number 17 on the Billboard Latin Digital Song Sales chart. In September 2018, he served as the opening act for Puerto Rican rapper Residente. That same month, he featured along with many other Puerto Rican artists on Lin-Manuel Miranda's song "A Forgotten Spot". Billboard named him as one of "10 Latin Artists to Watch in 2019". In July 2019, he participated in protests in Puerto Rico demanding the resignation of governor Ricardo Rosselló. In August 2019, he released the remix of his single "La Pelúa" with Guaynaa, Jon Z and Rafa Pabón. In December 2019, he released the first single from his upcoming album, a collaborative single titled "Por Ti" with Beto Montenegro, the lead singer of the Venezuelan band Rawayana. In March 2020, he collaborated with Uruguayan musician Jorge Drexler on the song "Loco Loquito".

== Artistry ==
PJ Sin Suela cites Vico C, OutKast, Joaquín Sabina, Blink-182, Calle 13, and Eminem as influences. His music often discusses social and political themes, and one of his goals as an artist is to "make a positive social change in the world". His song "Mueve la Chola" denounces violence and was inspired by the rapper's experience of helping a shooting victim into an ambulance. The song's accompanying music video features 60 women lip-syncing the lyrics to the song. He is also the voice of the hair in the song written by Lin-Manuel Miranda in Season 7 of the Netflix series ”Big Mouth”.

== Discography ==
- Letra Pa' tu Coco (2015)
- De Vuelta a Casa (2021)
- Chinchorreo Vol.1 (2023)
- Toda Época Tiene Su Encanto (2024)
