= 2018 in Latin music =

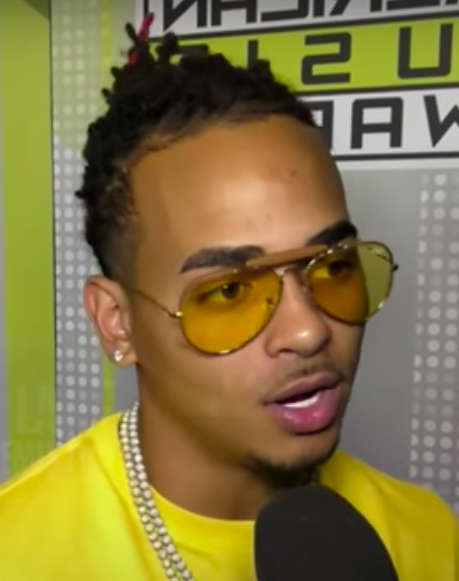
Puerto Rican singer Ozuna was named Top Latin Artist of the Year in the United States by Billboard.

The following is a list of events and releases that happened in 2018 in Latin music. The list covers events and releases from Latin regions including Spanish- and Portuguese-speaking areas of Latin America, Spain, Portugal, and the United States.

== Events ==
=== January–March ===
- January 28 – "Despacito" by Luis Fonsi and Daddy Yankee featuring Justin Bieber becomes the first Latin song to receive a diamond certification by the Recording Industry Association of America (RIAA). The RIAA measured data from the original version by Luis Fonsi featuring Daddy Yankee and the remix with Justin Bieber for the award. Luis Fonsi and Daddy Yankee become the 12th and 13th Latin artists to perform at the Grammy Awards.
- February 12 – "Despacito" by Luis Fonsi, Daddy Yankee, and Justin Bieber breaks the record for the longest-running number-one song on the Billboard Hot Latin Songs chart. The previous record was held by "Bailando" by Enrique Iglesias, Gente de Zona, and Descemer Bueno with 41 weeks.
- February 22 – The 30th Annual Lo Nuestro Awards are held at the American Airlines Arena in Miami, Florida. Nominations are absent due to being a commemorative edition. Special awards are given instead.
  - Cuban producer Emilio Estefan and Cuban singer Gloria Estefan receive the Lo Nuestro Award to Excellence.
  - Mexican singer Alejandro Fernández receives the Trajectory Award.
  - Puerto Rican singer Olga Tañón and Puerto Rican duo Wisin & Yandel receive a special award.
- March 6 – The 26th Annual ASCAP Latin Awards are held at the Marriott Marquis in New York City, New York.
  - "Despacito" by Luis Fonsi and Daddy Yankee featuring Justin Bieber wins Song of the Year. Only ASCAP members Justin Bieber, Jason "Poo Bear" Boyd, and Daddy Yankee receive the award.
  - Joss Favela is recognized as Songwriter of the Year.
- March 20 – The 25th Annual BMI Latin Awards are held at the Beverly Wilshire Hotel in Beverly Hills, California.
  - "Despacito" by Luis Fonsi and Daddy Yankee featuring Justin Bieber wins Contemporary Latin Song of the Year. Only BMI members Luis Fonsi and Marty James receive the award.
  - J Balvin is recognized as Contemporary Latin Songwriter of the Year.

=== April–June ===
- April 4 – The music video of "Despacito" by Luis Fonsi featuring Daddy Yankee becomes the first YouTube video to reach five billion views on the site.
- April 10 – "Despacito" by Luis Fonsi and Daddy Yankee featuring Justin Bieber reaches an unprecedented 50th week at number one on Billboard's Hot Latin Songs chart.
- April 23 – The Recording Industry Association of America (RIAA) reports that revenue for the Latin music market in the United States rose 37% in 2017, totaling in $243 million amounting to 2.8 percent of the market in the country. Streaming was noted as the primary factor for the rise in revenue for the Latin music market.
- April 24 – The International Federation of the Phonographic Industry (IFPI) reports that revenue for the Latin music market in Latin America increased 17.7% in 2017, denoting online streaming as the primary factor for its rise. Physical albums revenue declined 41.5%.
  - "Despacito" by Luis Fonsi and Daddy Yankee featuring Justin Bieber is the second best-selling digital single of 2017 in the world, with 24.3 million sales plus track-equivalent streams.
- April 26 – The 25th Annual Billboard Latin Music Awards are held at the Mandalay Bay Events Center in Las Vegas, Nevada.
  - Puerto Rican rapper Daddy Yankee is the biggest winner with eight awards.
  - Puerto Rican singer Ozuna wins Artist of the Year.
  - "Despacito" by Luis Fonsi and Daddy Yankee featuring Justin Bieber wins Hot Latin Song of the Year.
  - Fénix by Nicky Jam wins Top Latin Album of the Year.
- April 28 – Mexican group Calibre 50 and Colombian singer J Balvin receive an award by streaming service Pandora Radio for being the first artists to surpass a billion streams each in that platform.

=== July–September ===
- July 2 – Colombian singer J Balvin and Puerto Rican rapper Bad Bunny achieve their first number-one on the Billboard Hot 100 through "I Like It" with American rapper Cardi B. They become the first Latin artists to top the chart since Luis Fonsi and Daddy Yankee in 2017.
- July 10 – Nielsen SoundScan publishes the Latin mid-year chart for the United States and reports that streaming activity has increased in comparison to the first half of 2017, while album and digital single sales decreased.
  - Odisea by Puerto Rican singer Ozuna is the best-performing album, with 313,000 sales plus track- and stream-equivalent units.
  - CNCO by CNCO is the best-selling album, with 17,000 copies sold.
  - "Despacito" by Luis Fonsi and Daddy Yankee featuring Justin Bieber is the best-selling single, with 246,000 downloads sold; the most-streamed song, with 308,980,000 audio and video streams combined; the most-streamed audio, with 119,802,000 streams; and the most-streamed video, with 189,178,000 streams.
- July 15 – American singer Nicky Jam performs "X" and "Live It Up", the latter together with American rapper Will Smith and Kosovo Albanian singer Era Istrefi, during the FIFA World Cup closing ceremony.

=== October–December ===
- November 2 – The 13th LOS40 Music Awards take place at the WiZink Center in Madrid.
  - Prometo by Pablo Alborán wins Best Spanish Album.
  - "El Patio" by Pablo López wins Best Spanish Song.
  - "Déjala Que Baile" by Melendi and Alejandro Sanz wins Best Spanish Video.
  - Colombian band Morat wins Best Latin Artist.
- November 4 – The 25th MTV Europe Music Awards take place at the Bizkaia Arena in Bilbao.
  - Anitta wins Best Brazilian Act.
  - Ha*Ash wins Best Latin America North Act.
  - Sebastián Yatra wins Best Latin America Central Act.
  - Lali wins Best Latin America South Act.
  - Diogo Piçarra wins Best Portuguese Act.
  - Viva Suecia wins Best Spanish Act.
- November 15 – The 19th Annual Latin Grammy Awards are held at the MGM Grand Garden Arena in Las Vegas, Nevada:
  - "Telefonía" by Jorge Drexler wins the Latin Grammy Awards for Record of the Year and Song of the Year.
  - ¡México Por Siempre! by Luis Miguel wins the Album of the Year.
  - Karol G wins the Latin Grammy Award for Best New Artist
  - Mexican band Maná is honored Person of the Year, becoming the first musical ensemble to do so.

== Number-one albums and singles by country ==
- List of number-one hits of 2018 (Argentina)
- List of number-one songs of 2018 (Bolivia)
- List of Hot 100 number-one singles of 2018 (Brazil)
- List of number-one songs of 2018 (Colombia)
- List of number-one songs of 2018 (Guatemala)
- List of number-one albums of 2018 (Mexico)
- List of number-one songs of 2018 (Mexico)
- List of number-one albums of 2018 (Portugal)
- List of number-one albums of 2018 (Spain)
- List of number-one singles of 2018 (Spain)
- List of number-one Billboard Latin Albums from the 2010s
- List of number-one Billboard Hot Latin Songs of 2018
- List of number-one Billboard Regional Mexican Songs of 2018
- List of number-one songs of 2018 (Venezuela)

== Awards ==
- 2018 Premio Lo Nuestro
- 2018 Billboard Latin Music Awards
- 2018 Latin American Music Awards
- 2018 Latin Grammy Awards
- 2018 Heat Latin Music Awards
- 2018 MTV Millennial Awards

== Albums released ==
=== First-quarter ===
==== January ====
Day	Title	Artist	Genre(s)	Singles	Label
14	Dos Caminos	Samuel Serrano	Flamenco		Cebros Producciones
19	Mi Guitarra y Yo, Vol. 3	Regulo Caro	Regional Mexican		DEL
19	Alô Vila Isabeeeel!!!	Martinho da Vila	Samba		Sony Music Brasil
26	En Vida	Banda Los Sebastianes de Mazatlan, Sinaloa	Banda		Fonovisa
26	2:00 am	Raquel Sofía	Singer-songwriter		Sony Music Latin
26	Delirium Tremens	Rosario La Tremendita	Flamenco		Universal Music Spain
26	Amor E Música	Maria Rita	Samba		Universal Music

==== February ====
Day	Title	Artist	Genre(s)	Singles	Label
1	Buenos Aires Noir	Allison Brewster Franzetti and Carlos Franzetti	Classical		Amapola
2	Miro Lo Que Otros No Miran	Grupo Codiciado	Regional Mexican		Rancho Humilde
2	Miradas	Nana Mendoza	Latin pop		Nana Mendoza
2	Lebron	Tote King	Latin hip hop		Sony Music Spain
9	Musas: Un Homenaje Al Folclore Latinoamericano En Manos de Los Macorinos 2	Natalia LaFourcade	Folk		Columbia
9	Diomedizao	Elvis Crespo	Tropical		Flash
9	Un Mundo Raro: Las Canciones De José Alfredo Jiménez	Various artists			Warner Music Mexico
14	Irremplazable	Adrián Acosta	Tejano		Talentos Music, LZ
20	Ecos Del Silencio	Ofrenda	Classical		Asociación Sinfónica De Heredia
23	Mi Viaje	Danilo Montero	Latin Christian		Integrity
23	Diferentes Tipos De Luz	Sony Music			Integrity

==== March ====
Day	Title	Artist	Genre(s)	Singles	Label
1	¿Dónde Bailarán las Niñas?	Ximena Sariñana			Warner Music
2	El Wason BB	Lary Over	Latin hip-hop		Carbon Fiber Music
2	Primero Soy Mexicana	Ángela Aguilar	Mariachi, ranchera	"Tu Sangre en Mi Cuerpo (feat. Pepe Aguilar)"	Machín
2	Los Creadores del Sonido	Chiquito Team Band	Salsa		Planet
2	Al Este Del Cante	Arcángel	Flamenco		Universal Music Spain
2	Casas	Rubel	Brazilian rock		Dorileo, Tratore
4	Identidad	Miguel Siso			Guataca
8	Fuerza Arará	Telmary	Latin alternative		Sony Music
9	Ahora	Melendi	Latin pop		Sony Music
9	+AR	Almir Sater & Renato Teixeira	Brazilian roots		Universal Music
13	Tex Mex Funk	Roger Velásquez & The Latin Legendz	Tejano		VDiscos
16	Entre Botellas	Chiquis Rivera	Regional Mexican		Sweet Sound
16	Hazte Sentir	Laura Pausini	Latin pop	"Nadie Ha Dicho"	Warner Music Latina
16	Geometria del Rayo	Manolo García	Pop rock		Sony Music Spain, Perro
16	Prazer, Eu Sou Ferrugem	Ferrugem	Samba		Warner Music Brasil
23	25/7	Víctor Manuelle	Salsa	"Hasta Que Me De la Gana" "Mala y Peligrosa" "Amarte Duro"	Sony Music Latin
23	Calidad y Cantidad	La Arrolladora Banda El Limón de René Camacho	Banda		Disa
23	Nostalgias	Daniel Binelli & Nick Danielson	Tango		Bell Ville
25	Omara Siempre	Omara Portuondo	Tropical		EGREM
25	Pa'lante el Mambo!	Diego Gutiérrez	Tropical fusion		EGREM
24	Viene De Panamá (Sin Raíz No Hay País)	Afrodisíaco	Folk		Star Arsis Entertainment
26	Motivos	Maria Rivas	Tropical		Angel Falls Artists
27	Sexflix (EP)	Alex Rose			Los Oídos Fresh
28	Un Canto Nuevo	Juan Antonio Cuéllar y Luis Torres Zuleta			
30	Orquesta Akokan	Orquesta Akokan	Mambo		Daptone
30	Relax	Kassin	Brazilian rock		Lab 344

=== Second-quarter ===
==== April ====
Day	Title	Artist	Genre(s)	Singles	Label
6	CNCO	CNCO	Latin pop, reggaeton	"Hey DJ" "Reggaetón Lento (Remix)" "Mamita" "Sólo Yo" "Mi Medicina"	Sony Music Latin
6	El Sueño Americano	La Energía Norteña	Regional Mexican		Azteca
6	Porque Todavía Te Quiero	Jimmy Gonzalez y Grupo Mazz	Tejano		M Music & Entertainment Group, Freddie
6	La Alegría y El Canto	Marta Gómez	Folk		Aluna
6	Vigor Tanguero	Pedro Giraudo	Tango		Zoho Music
6	Back to the Sunset	Dafnis Prieto Big Band	Latin jazz		Dafnison Music
6	Fiero	Quinteto Bataraz			Independent
6	Ahora O Nunca	La Pegatina			
7	Legado	Formell y Los Van Van	Tropical		Formell y los Van Van
10	Cantor del Pueblo	Alexander Abreu and Havana D'Primera	Salsa		Páfata Productions
10	Enamórate Bailando	Reynier Pérez y Su Septeto Acarey	Salsa		Independent
10	Setenta Veces Siete	Alfareros	Latin Christian		Alfareros
13	Trap Capos II	Noriel	Latin trap		Sony Music Latin, Ganda Entertainment
13	Sobrenatural	Manny Cruz	Tropical fusion		Sony Music Latin, Ganda Entertainment
13	Leo Brouwer: The Book Of Signs, Paulo Bellinati: Concerto Caboclo	Brasil Guitar Duo, David Amado, and The Delaware Symphony Orchestra	Classical		Naxos
13	Alma Con Brío	La Catrina String Quartet	Classical		Rycy
14	Mind of a Master	Bobby Valentin & The Latin Jazzists	Latin jazz		Bronco
16	Magia Todo El Día	Luis Pescetti y Amigos	Children's		LMP
16	Anniversary	Spanish Harlem Orchestra	Salsa		ArtistShare
20	Pura Lumbre	Legado 7	Regional Mexican		Rancho Humilde
20	Aztlán	Zoé	Latin alternative		Universal Music Mexico
20	Bendecido	Lenin Ramírez	Regional Mexican		DEL
20	El Que A Ti Te Gusta	Voz de Mando	Norteño		Afinarte Music
20	Hamilton De Holanda Trio – Jacob 10ZZ	Hamilton de Holanda Trio			Deck
20	¡Baila Conmigo!	Yubá-Iré	Folk		Ox Lab
24	50 Años Tocando Para Ti	Bogotá Philharmonic		Orquesta Filarmónica De Bogotá	
27	Comeré Callado, Vol. 2: Con Banda	Gerardo Ortíz	Regional Mexican		Sony Music Latin
27	Tributo a la Cumbia Colombiana 4	Alberto Barros	Cumbia		Fonovisa, Universal Music
27	Los Ángeles Existen	Pesado	Norteño		Remex Music, Sony Music
27	Dona De Mim	Iza	Pop		Warner Music Brasil
27	Mágica y Misteriosa	Claudia Montero	Classical		La Cupula Music
30	La Gira	Sibilino		Dios	

==== May ====
Day	Title	Artist	Genre(s)	Singles	Label
1	Cinque	Elio Villafranca	Latin jazz		Universal Music Mexico
4	Todos Somos MAS	Various artists	Latin pop	"Si No Te Hubieras Ido" "Más Que Tu Amigo"	Universal Music Mexico
4	Solo Los Buenos Momentos	Mojito Lite	Latin pop		Mojito Lite Sinfonic
4	Tango Cosmopolita	Omar Mollo & Gran Orquesta Típica Otra	Tango		Sony Music Argentina
5	Imaginare	Claraluna	Children's		Claraluna Taller Artístico
8	Ahora Lo Sabes Todo	Los Pixel	Rock en español		Independent
11	Ubuntu	Piso 21	Latin pop, reggaeton	"Me Llamas" "Besándote" "Déjala Que Vuelva" "Tu Héroe" "Adrenalina" "Te Amo" "La Vida Sin Ti"	Warner Music Mexico
11	La Criatura	Nacho	Reggaeton	"Bailame" "Romance" "Happy Happy"	Universal Music Latino
11	Presenta: 80	Milton Salcedo	Tropical		The Entity, Mas Musica
11	Medoro Madera	Rubén Blades and Roberto Delgado & Orquesta	Tropical		Rubén Blades Productions
11	Supernova	Sheila King	Tropical fusion		Rubén Blades Productions
11	Dolce Inferno: Dolce	Proyecto Insomnio	Tejano		Promomusic
11	La Casa De Un Pianista De Jazz	Adrian Iaies Trio	Jazz		DBN
11	Contagem Regressiva	Anderson Freire	Latin Christian		MK Music
11	Lenine Em Trânsito	Lenine	Brazilian rock		Universal Music, Casa 9 Produções
11	Divas Cantan Al Principe	Mariachi Divas de Cindy Shea	Mariachi		East Side Records, Shea Records
11	Cruzando Borders	Los Texmaniacs	Regional Mexican		Smithsonian Folkways
15	Ecos Do Acaso e Casos De Caos	Jay Vaquer	Brazilian rock		Warner Music
18	FAME	Maluma	Latin pop, Latin trap	"El Prestamo" "Felices los 4" "Corazón"(ft. Nego do Borel)	Sony Music Latin
18	MANTRA	Sebastián Yatra	Latin pop	"Devuélveme el Corazón" "Como Mirarte" "Traicionera" "Por Perro"	Universal Music Latino
18	Soy Yo	Kany García	Latin pop	"Para Siempre" "Soy Yo"	Sony Music Latin
18	Encanto Tropical	Monsieur Periné	Latin pop		Sony Music Colombia, M3 Music
18	Pensacola Radio	Lucas and The Woods	Pop rock		Independent
18	Cuerpo y Alma	Beatriz Luengo	Latin pop		Sony Music Latin
18	21	Dani de Morón	Flamenco		Universal Music Spain
18	Amor é Isso	Erasmo Carlos	Pop		Som Livre
18	Deus é Mulher	Elza Soares	MPB		Deck
22	Nível Do Céu	Cassiane	Latin Christian		MK Music
24	Más de Mi	Tony Succar	Salsa		Unity Entertainment
25	Vibras	J Balvin	Pop, reggaeton	"Mi Gente "Machika" "Ahora" "Ambiente"	Universal Music Latino
25	El OG	Miky Woodz	Reggaeton		Gold2 Latin Music
25	Herencia de La Tierra Mia	Mariachi Herencia de Mexico	Mariachi		Mariachi Heritage Foundation
25	Sin Miedo	ChocQuibTown	Urban		Sony Music Latin
25	Coastcity	Coastcity	Urban		Empire
25	De Parranda	Jean Carlos Centero and Ronal Urbina	Vallenato		Codiscos
25	Momentos de Cine	Daniel Santacruz	Bachata		Penluis Music
25	A Mí Qué	José Alberto "El Canario" and El Septeto Santiaguero	Tropical		Los Canarios Music
25	Brindemos	Jerry Demara	Banda		Casa Nacional
25	Tú Primero	Andy Alemany	Latin Christian		Independent
25	Edu, Dori & Marcos	Edu Lobo, Dori Caymmi, e Marcos Valle	MPB		Biscoito Fino
25	Mariza	Mariza	Fado		Warner Music Portugal
25	Gourmet	Orishas	Urban		Sony Music Latin
29	Esto Es Vida	Silvestre Dangond	Vallenato		Sony Music
30	Claroscura	Aterciopelados	Latin alternative		Sony Music Colombia
30	Compositores	Claudia Prieto	Singer-songwriter		440 Portátil
30	Próximo Nivel	Grupo Alamo	Tejano		Ro'

==== June ====
Day	Title	Artist	Genre(s)	Singles	Label
1	Chaconnerie	Silvia Márquez	Classical		Ibs Classical
1	Heart of Brazil	Eddie Daniels	Latin jazz		
1	Hermeto Pascoal e Sua Visão Original do Forró	Hermeto Pascoal	Forró		Scubidu Music]
8	Esto Sí Es Cumbia	Los Ángeles Azules	Cumbia		OCESA Seitrack
8	Rosa	Camila Gallardo	Latin pop		Universal Music Chile
8	De Outro Lugar	Joana Marte	Alternative rock, psychedelic rock, progressive rock	"Inimigos" / "Valsa"	Urtiga
8	Nuestro Hogar	Quintero's Salsa Project	Salsa		Quintero's
30	Leyendas De Mi Pueblo	Mariachi Sol de México de José Hernández	Mariachi		Serenata

=== Third-quarter ===
==== July ====
Day	Title	Artist	Genre(s)	Singles	Label
2	Francis & Felipe	Francis & Felipe	Música sertenaja		Independente
4	West Side Story Reimagined	Bobby Sanabria Multiverse Big Band	Latin jazz		Jazzheads
11	Encontros	Antonio Adolfo featuring Orquestra Atlantica			Aam Music
13	Ares	Arcángel	Reggaeton		Pina
17	Real Hasta La Muerte	Anuel AA	Reggaeton, Latin trap		Real Hasta La Muerte
18	Guarda Meu Coração	Delino Marçal	Latin Christian		Universal Music Christian Group
20	Mitad y Mitad	Calibre 50	Norteño		Disa
20	Sagrado	Adriana Arydes	Latin Christian		Universal Music
27	La Oscuridad	Bryant Myers	Reggaeton, Latin trap		Entertainment One

==== August ====
Day	Title	Artist	Genre(s)	Singles	Label
3	BACH	Bandalos Chinos	Latin alternative		Casete
3	O Tempo É Agora	Anavitória	Brazilian pop		Universal Music
10	Brava	Lali	Latin pop	"Una Na" "Tu Novia" "100 Grados" "Besarte Mucho"	Sony Argentina
10	Más Romantico Que Nunca	Vicente Fernández	Bolero, ranchera	"Hablame"	Columbia
10	Para Dias Ruins	Mahmundi	Brazilian pop		Universal Music
17	¿Quién Contra Nosotros?	Alex Zurdo	Latin Christian		Az Music
17	OK OK OK	Gilberto Gil	MPB		Biscoito Fino
23	MTV Unplugged: El Desconecte	Molotov	Rock en español		Universal Music Mexico
24	Aura	Ozuna	Reggaeton	"La Modelo" "Única" "Vaina Loca"	VP
24	Señalado por Costumbre	Adriel Favela	Regional Mexican		Gerencia 360 Music
24	Mi Tributo a Juan Gabriel	Cristian Castro	Latin pop	"He Venido a Pedirte Perdón"	Sony Music Mexico
24	MTV Unplugged: El Desconecte	Molotov	Rock en español		Universal Music Group
24	Nego Alvaro Canta Sereno e Moa	Nego Álvaro	Samba		Biscoito Fino
30	Lição #2: Dorival	Quartabê			Risco

==== September ====
Day	Title	Artist	Genre(s)	Singles	Label
7	Mar de Colores	Álvaro Soler	Latin pop		Sony Music
7	Ponle Actitud	Felipe Peláez	Tropical		Sony Music
7	Folia de Treis	Edu Ribeiro, Fábio Peron, Toninho Ferragutti			Blaxtream
11	Un Solo Movimiento: El Album	Various artists	Reggaeton		Alofoke Music
12	Madame Ayahuasca	Taburete	Pop rock		Voltereta
13	Prender un Fuego	Marilina Bertoldi	Latin alternative		Pelo Music
14	Con Todas Las Fuerzas	Banda Sinaloense MS de Sergio Lizárraga	Banda		Sony Music Latin
14	Sentimientos	Pavel Núñez	Latin pop		Pavel Corredor Music Group
14	O Céu Sobre a Cabeça	Chal	Brazilian rock		Pavel Corredor Music Group
14	Live Móvel	Luan Santana	Som Livre		Pavel Corredor Music Group
21	Así o Más Claro	Jorge Medina	Regional Mexican		Universal Music Mexico
21	En Buena Compañía	Gilberto Santa Rosa, Víctor García and La Sonora Sanjuanera	Salsa	"Amor de los Amores" "Quiéreme"	Duars Entertainment
21	Yo Soy La Tradición	Miguel Zenón featuring Spektral Quartet	Latin jazz		
21	Oxígeno	Malú			
25	Back to the Game	Tempo	Urban		Free Music
27	A Través Del Vaso	Banda Los Sebastianes	Banda		Fonovisa
28	Mi Movimiento	De La Ghetto	Urban		Free Music, Warner Music Latina
28	Más Grande (En Vivo)	Gateway	Latin Christian		Gateway Music
28	Sincera	Claudia Brant	Latin pop		Brantones
28	Checo Acosta 30	Checo Acosta	Cumbia		Codiscos
28	Tributo al Sol	La Explosiva Banda De Maza	Banda		Warner Music Mexico
28	Fandango at the Wall: A Soundtrack for the United States, Mexico and Beyond	Arturo O'Farrill & The Afro-Latin Jazz Orchestra			

=== Fourth-quarter ===
==== October ====
Day	Title	Artist	Genre(s)	Singles	Label
4	Não Para Não	Pabllo Vittar	Pop		
5	Dolor y Amor	El Fantasma	Regional Mexican		Afinarte
5	Intuición	Gian Marco	Latin pop		Enjoymusic
5	De Todos Os Tempos	Monarco	Samba		Biscoito Fino
5	¡Alegría!	Sonia de los Santos	Latin children's		Golondrina
12	80 Años de Musica Entre Amigos	Banda El Recodo	Banda		Fonovisa
12	El Favorito	Chuy Lizarraga & Su Banda Tierra Sinaloense	Banda		Fonovisa
12	Quiero Volver	Tini	Pop, Latin pop	"Te Quiero Más" "Princesa" "Consejo de Amor "Quiero Volver" "Por Que Te Vas"	Hollywood Records
12	Latinoamerica	Álex Anwandter	Latin alternative		Nacional
12	Discutible	Babasónicos	Latin alternative		Sony Music Mexico
12	Volver	Plácido Domingo and Pablo Sáinz Villegas			
19	Una Noche Con Rubén Blades	Jazz at Lincoln Center Orchestra with Wynton Marsalis and Ruben Blades	Latin jazz		Blue Engine
19	Barrios de Mi Tierra (Canciones de Rubén Blades)	Iván Barrios	Tropical		Hb Music
19	Vulcão	The Baggios	Brazilian rock		Toca Discos
25	Balas perdidas	Morat	Latin pop	"Besos en Guerra"	Universal Music Spain
26	Monte Sagrado	Draco Rosa	Rock en español		Sony Music Latin
27	Atípico	Bernardo Monk	Tango		Independiente
29	El Plan	Siete	Tejano		Indepe Music
29	48 Años	Eva Ayllón	Folk		Aylloncito Producciones

==== November ====
Day	Title	Artist	Genre(s)	Singles	Label
2	El mal querer	Rosalía	Flamenco nuevo	"Malamente" "Pienso en tu mirá" "Di mi nombre"	Sony Music
2	El Hombre	El Alfa	Urban		El Jefe
2	Amo	La Maquinaria Norteña	Norteño		Fonovisa
2	Mulamba	Mulamba	Rock music, MPB	"P.U.T.A.", "Desses Nadas"	Máquina Discos
2	Cargar la surte	Andrés Calamaro	Pop rock	"Verdades Afiladas"	Universal Music Group
2	Manual De Viaje A Un Lugar Lejano	Jumbo	Pop rock		Universal Music Group, Discos Valiente
2	Esto Que Dice!	Carlos Rueda and Diego Daza	Vallenato		ONErpm
8	Gente	Priscilla Alcântara	Latin Christian		Sony Music
9	Norma	Mon Laferte	Latin pop Tropical Fusion	"El Beso" "Por qué me fui a enamorar de ti" "El Mambo" "Caderas Blancas"	Universal Music
9	Valiente	Thalía	Latin pop, Reggaeton, trap	"No me acuerdo" "Me Oyen, Me Escuchan" "Lento" "Lindo Pero Bruto"	Sony Music Latin
9	Agustín	Fonseca	Latin pop		Sony Music Latin
9	Norma	Mon Laferte	Latin alternative		Universal Music Group, Discos Valiente
9	Revolucionario	Quinteto Astor Piazzolla	Tango		East 54 Entertainment
9	Todxs	Ana Cañas	Brazilian pop		
15	Raíces	Various artists	Vallenato		Babel Discos
16	The Green Trip	Tr3r Elemento	Regional Mexican		DEL
16	Colores	Elida Reyna y Avante	Tejano		Freddie
16	Jazz Batá 2	Chucho Valdés	Latin jazz		Mack Avenue Music Group
16	Astronauta	Zahara			G.O.Z.Z.
18	Amor Presente	Leonel García			Sony Music Mexico
23	Va por México	Luis Cobos with The Royal Philharmonic Orchestra and El Mariachi Juvenil Tecalitlán	Folk		Independiente
23	Elemental	Jimmy Branly, Jimmy Haslip, and Otmaro Ruiz	Latin jazz		Blue Canoe
23	Rio - São Paulo	André Marques	Latin jazz		Blaxtream
23	Anaí Rosa Atraca Geraldo Pereira	Anaí Rosa	Samba		Selo Sesc
23	Do Avesso	António Zambujo	Fado		Universal Music Portugal
30	Una Razón para Seguir	A.N.I.M.A.L.	Rock en español		Sony Music
30	25 Años Vol. 1	El Mimoso	Banda		Cielo Music
30	O Ouro do Pó da Estrada	Elba Ramalho	Brazilian roots		Deckdisc

==== December ====
Day	Title	Artist	Genre(s)	Singles	Label
1	Vereda Tropical	Olga Cerpa and	Tropical		Edicciones Mestisay, EGREM
7	Mi Luz Mayor	Eddie Palmieri	Salsa		Uprising Music
7	Tu Príncipe	Lucky Joe	Tejano		Freddie
7	Ao Vivo Em São Paulo	Mano Walter	Música sertaneja		Som Livre
12	Todo Pasa	Juan Delgado	Latin Christian		Pristine Music
Tu Príncipe	Lucky Joe	Tejano		Freddie	
14	Los Campeones del Pueblo (The Big Leagues)	Wisin & Yandel	Reggaeton		Sony Music Latin
14	Una Historia Musical	Tito Nieves and Sergio George	Salsa	"Viva la Música"	Sony Music Latin
14	Pa' Los Recuerdos, Vol. 2	El Fantasma	Regional Mexican		Afinarte Music
14	Nunca Te Rindas	Grupo Vidal	Tejano		Freddie
18	Tercer Viaje	Hugo Fattoruso and Yahiro Tomohiro	Latin jazz		Montevideo Music Group
21	En Vivo con Tololoche	Legado 7	Norteño		Rancho Humilde
21	Em Sua Direção	Péricles	Samba		Onerpm
24	X 100pre	Bad Bunny	Latin trap, hip hop, reggaeton	"Estamos Bien" "Mia" "Solo de Mi"	Rimas

=== Unknown dates ===
Title	Artist	Genre(s)	Singles	Label
VIII & IX	Timbiriche	Latin Pop		Melody Internacional, Melody Internacional
Son Verdad	Xiomara Fortuna			
Mercado de los Corotos	Augusto Bracho			

== Best-selling records ==
=== Best-selling albums ===
The following is a list of the top 10 best-selling Latin albums (including album-equivalent units) in the United States in 2018, according to Billboard.

Rank	Album	Artist
1	Ozuna	Ozuna
2	Aura	Ozuna
3	Vibras	J Balvin
4	Golden	Romeo Santos
5	El Dorado	Shakira
6	Fénix	Nicky Jam
7	Todavía Me Amas: Lo Mejor De Aventura	Aventura
8	Me Dejé Llevar	Christian Nodal
9	Real Hasta La Muerte	Anuel AA
10	FAME	Maluma

=== Best-performing songs ===
The following is a list of the top 10 best-performing Latin songs in the United States in 2018, according to Billboard.

Rank	Single	Artist
1	"Despacito"	Luis Fonsi and Daddy Yankee featuring Justin Bieber
2	"Mi Gente"	J Balvin and Willy William featuring Beyoncé
3	"Dura"	Daddy Yankee
4	"X"	Nicky Jam and J Balvin
5	"Te Boté"	Casper Mágico, Nio García, Darell, Nicky Jam, Ozuna, and Bad Bunny
6	"El Farsante"	Ozuna and Romeo Santos
7	"Échame la Culpa"	Luis Fonsi and Demi Lovato
8	"La Modelo"	Ozuna and Cardi B
9	"Sin Pijama"	Becky G and Natti Natasha
10	"Me Niego"	Reik featuring Ozuna and Wisin

== Deaths ==
- January 8 – Cuco Del Cid, 73, Mariachi musical director
- January 9 – Joel Alanís (47), rock músician; sclerosis.
- January 13 – Francisco Jesús Pérez Cuevas, 48, Spanish musician
- January 15 – Carlos Puig Premión, 64, Cuban orchestra director
- January 16 – Madalena Iglésias, 78, Portuguese actress and singer.
- January 17:
  - Augusto Polo Campos, 85, Peruvian composer.
  - Tony Taño, Cuban orchestra director
- January 18 – Perico Lino, 86, Spanish singer and member of Los Gofiones
- March 2 – Jesús López Cobos, 78, Spanish conductor, cancer.
- March 7 – Mayra Mayra, 54, Puerto Rican merengue singer
- March 10 – Lena Villarreal, 38, Nicaraguan American event producer
- March 14 – Pijuán, 75, Puerto Rican pianist.
- March 24 – José Antonio Abreu, 78, Venezuelan conductor and founder of El Sistema and recipient of the Latin Grammy Trustees Award
- April 16 – Dona Ivone Lara, 97, Brazilian singer and composer.
- April 19 – Graciela Agudelo, 72, Mexican pianist and composer.
- April 28 – Roberto Angleró, 88, Puerto Rican music composer and singer.
- May 14 – Gustavo Márquez, Venezuelan bassist for C4 Trio
- May 18 – Anthony Cruz, Puerto Rican-American salsa singer ("Dile a Él" and "No le Temas a Él").
- May 28
  - María Dolores Pradera, 93, Spanish singer and actress, recipient of the Latin Grammy Lifetime Achievement Award.
  - Evio di Marzo, 64, Venezuelan singer-songwriter (Adrenalina Caribe), shot.
- May 31 – Joseíto Mateo, 98, Dominican merengue singer, recipient of the Latin Grammy Lifetime Achievement Award.
- June 6 – Jimmy Gonzalez, 67, American Tejano singer, fronted Grupo Mazz and a four-time Grammy Award winner.
- June 15 – Santos Blanco, 46, Spanish musician, dancer, and actor
- June 19
  - Efrén Echeverría, 86, Paraguayan musician, composer, and record collector
- June 24
  - Ángel Medardo Luzuriaga, 82, Ecuadorian Andean cumbia musician
  - Xiomara Alfaro, 88, Cuban opera singer
- July 2 – Daniel Sais, 55, Argentine keyboardist for Soda Stereo
- July 9 – Jorge Valenzuela, 22, Regional Mexican singer
- July 28 – Carlos Moreán, 70, Mexican Venezuelan singer and composer
- August 7 – Carlos Almenar Otero, 92, Venezuelan singer and songwriter.
- August 15 – Fabio Melannitto, 32, Venezuelan singer and member of Uff!
- September 7 – Wilson Moreira, 81, Brazilian singer
- September 9 – Mr. Catra, 49, Brazilian musician (stomach cancer)
- September 14 – Carlos Rubira Infante, 96, Ecuadorian pasillo and pasacalle singer-songwriter
- September 18 – Carmencita Lara, 91, Peruvian singer
- September 24
  - Alfredo Ábalos, 80, Argentine folk singer
  - Vicente Bianchi, 98, Chilean conductor, composer and pianist
- September 26 – Tito Madi, 89, Brazilian singer and composer
- September 30 – Ângela Maria, 89, Brazilian singer
- October 1 – Jerry González, 69, American bandleader and trumpeter (heart attack)
- October 6 – Montserrat Caballé, 85, Spanish opera singer, Grammy winner (1968), gallbladder infection.
- October 8 – Gretchen G, 28, Venezuelan singer
- October 18 – Raúl Marrero, 92, Puerto Rican salsa musician and composer
- October 19 – José Capel, Spanish singer and composer
- October 22 – Al Hurricane, 81, American singer and songwriter, complications from prostate cancer.
- October 27 – Enrique "Neto" Gonzalez, Mexican indie producer and sound engineer, auto accident
- November 2 – Roy Hargrove, 49, American jazz trumpeter, Grammy winner (1997, 2002), cardiac arrest.
- November 13
  - Lucho Gatica, 90, Chilean bolero singer and actor
  - Arthur Maia, 56, Brazilian composer and musician (heart attack)
- November 23 – Misi, Colombian composer and musical theatre director
- December 13 – Samurai, 33, Colombian rapper
- December 16 – Chiquetete, 70, Spanish flamenco and ballad singer, heart attack ("Esta Cobardía", "Volveré").
- December 24 – Jaime Torres, 80, Argentine charango player.
- December 25 – Guto Barros, 61, Brazilian guitarist and songwriter (Blitz).
- December 27 – Miúcha, 81, Brazilian singer and composer
