= Esperándote =

Esperándote may refer to:

- Esperándote (TV series), a 1985 Mexican telenovela
- Esperándote (Tito Rojas song), 1995
- Esperándote (Manuel Turizo song), 2017
