= Besándote =

Single by Piso 21

from the album Ubuntu
- Released: 21 April 2017
- Length: 3:01
- Label: Warner Music Mexico
- Songwriters: Juan David Castaño; David Escobar Gallego; Salomón Villada Hoyos; Juan David Huertas; Pablo Mejia; Alejandro Patiño; Anne-Marie Rose Nicholson (Remix); Jeniffer Declive (Remix)

Piso 21 singles chronology
"Me Llamas" (2016)	"Besándote" (2017)	"El Rehén" (2017)

Anne-Marie singles chronology
"Either Way" (2017)	"Besándote (Remix)" (2017)	"Heavy" (2017)

Remix cover

Music video
- "Besándote" on YouTube

"Besándote" (transl. "Kissing you") is a song by Colombian band Piso 21, from their second studio album Ubuntu (2018). It was released on 21 April 2017 by the Mexican division of Warner Music Group as the album's second single. On 1 September 2017, a remix featuring English singer Anne-Marie was released. The official lyric video for the remix was released on August 31, 2017 on Piso 21's YouTube account.

== Music video ==
The music video for "Besándote" premiered on 20 April 2017 on Piso 21's YouTube account. Recorded in Mar del Plata, Argentina, it was directed by David Bohórquez and has been viewed over 100 million times.

== Track listing ==
Digital download
No.	Title	Length
1.	"Besándote"	3:01

Digital download – Anne-Marie Remix
No.	Title	Length
1.	"Besándote" (Anne-Marie remix)	3:21

== Charts ==
Weekly chart performance for "Besándote"
Chart (2017)	Peak position
Argentina (Monitor Latino)	9
Chile (Monitor Latino)	8
Colombia (National-Report)	11
Ecuador (National-Report)	18
Mexico Airplay (Billboard)	39
Paraguay (Monitor Latino)	3
Spain (Promusicae)	39
US Latin Pop Airplay (Billboard)	24

=== Year-end charts ===
2017 year-end chart performance for "Besándote"
Chart (2017)	Position
Spain (PROMUSICAE)	81

== Certifications ==
Certifications and sales for "Besándote"
Region	Certification	Certified units/sales
Mexico (AMPROFON)	2× Platinum	120,000^{‡}
Spain (Promusicae)	Platinum	40,000^{‡}
United States (RIAA)	2× Platinum (Latin)	120,000^{‡}
^{‡} Sales+streaming figures based on certification alone.
