= Lento (Thalía song) =

Single by Thalía featuring Gente de Zona

from the album Valiente
- Released: 27 September 2018
- Length: 3:36
- Label: Sony Latin
- Songwriters: Julio Reyes Copello; Andrés Castro; Édgar Barrera; Alexander Delgado; Jorge Luis Chacín; Jon Leone; Omar Alfanno; Randy Malcolm; Sergio George
- Producer: Sergio George

Thalía singles chronology
"Me Oyen, Me Escuchan" (2018)	"Lento" (2018)	"Lindo Pero Bruto" (2019)

Gente de Zona singles chronology
"Stop Me from Falling" (2018)	"Lento" (2018)	"Nadie Como Yo" (2019)

Music video
- "Lento" on YouTube

"Lento" (English: "Slow") is a song by Mexican singer Thalía and Cuban duo Gente de Zona, from Thalía's fourteenth studio album, Valiente. It was released by Sony Music Latin as the album's third single on September 27, 2018.

== Music video ==
The video for Lento was released on the same day as the song. It shows Thalía escaping the paparazzi and dancing at a beach party with Gente de Zona. The video was filmed in the beaches in Miami.

== Commercial performance ==
The song peaked at number 5 on the Billboard Latin Digital Songs charts becoming Thalía's highest peak on that chart. The song also topped the Tropical Digital Song Sales chart in Billboard. The song entered charts in several countries in Latin America, Spain, the U.S., and Hungary.

== Charts ==
=== Weekly charts ===
Chart (2018–19)	Peak position
Bolivia (Monitor Latino)	10
Chile (Monitor Latino)	18
El Salvador (Monitor Latino)	5
Guatemala Pop (Monitor Latino)	16
Honduras Pop (Monitor Latino)	5
Hungary (Single Top 40)	17
Mexico (Billboard Mexican Airplay)	39
Mexico (Monitor Latino)	15
Spain (PROMUSICAE)	88
US Tropical Digital Song Sales (Billboard)	1
US Tropical Airplay (Billboard)	4
US Latin Pop Airplay (Billboard)	30

=== Year-end charts ===
Chart (2018)	Position
Mexico Pop (Monitor Latino)	86
US Tropical Digital Song Sales (Billboard)	20

Chart (2019)	Position
Chile (Monitor Latino)	96
Honduras Pop (Monitor Latino)	18
Perú Pop (Monitor Latino)	47
US Tropical Airplay (Billboard)	26
