= André Marques (pianist) =

Brazilian jazz pianist

André Marques (born 1975) is a Brazilian jazz pianist working with the Hermeto Pascoal group since joining in the mid-1990s as a teenager.

Born and raised in São Paulo, Marques had already been an established professional pianist by his early teens. Aside from the Hermeto Pascoal group, Marques is known for his work with the jazz trio, Trio Curupira along with Cleber Almeida and Fábio Gouvêa. Marques is a multi-instrumentalist; including piano, Marques also plays flute, piccolo, accordion, and melodica.
