= Me Oyen, Me Escuchan =

Thalía song

Single by Thalía

from the album Valiente
- Released: 31 August 2018
- Genre: Latin pop
- Length: 2:42
- Label: Sony Latin
- Songwriter: Thalía Sodi
- Producer: Chuy Nuñez

Thalía singles chronology
"No Me Acuerdo" (2018)	"Me Oyen, Me Escuchan" (2018)	"Lento" (2018)

Audio video
- "Me Oyen, Me Escuchan" on YouTube

Me Oyen, Me Escuchan (They Hear Me, They Listen to Me) is a song by Mexican singer Thalía from Thalía's fourteenth studio album, Valiente. It was released by Sony Music Latin as the album's second single on August 31, 2018.

== Background and Composition ==
On August 2, 2018 Thalía did a Facebook Live video to thank her fans for her previous video No Me Acuerdo reaching 200 million views on YouTube. At the beginning of the video she says "Hello! Estan ahi mis vidas? Estan ahi? Me oyen? Me escuchan?" and then begins to sing and dance "Me escuchan? Me oyen? Me escuchan, me oyen, me sienten? Yo estoy felíz felíz felíz. Felíz de que los tengo! De que los tengo, tengo, tengo!". At the end of the video she said "Gracias, gracias. Tiki tiki tin, tiki tiki tin tin tin, taka taka tan. Los amo! Bye, bye, bye, bye, bye, bye, bye. Como le apago?". The way she said all those things went viral for being very funny to a lot of people that they started recording themselves saying the same things in the same way, thus starting a new meme called the Thalía Challenge. As more people posted their Thalía Challenge videos online, even several celebrities, the video got more attention that a YouTuber named Chuy Nuñez did an autone remix of the video and uploaded it to his Facebook and YouTube channel on August 22, 2018. On August 31, 2018 Thalía released a studio recorded version of the song on all digital platforms.

== Release and reception ==
The song became the most surprising hit of the year so Thalía decided to include it in the album as a bonus track.

== Live performance ==
Thalía performed the song at the charity concert Las Que Mandan, where she was the one to open the show and came onto the stage singing the song from in between the crowd.

== Video ==
Though the song does not have an official video, a lot of people consider the Chuy Nuñez remix video to be the song's video and Thalía released an audio video on her official YouTube channel the same day of the song. On September 3, 2018 Thalía shared an official choreography video for the song on her social media. The video shows a group of teenagers dancing to the song. The video received 1.2 million views on Instagram just a few hours after its release.

== Charts ==
Chart (2018)	Peak position
Mexico (Billboard Espanol Airplay)	31
Spain Physical/Digital (PROMUSICAE)	26
