= No Me Acuerdo =

Single by Thalía and Natti Natasha

from the album Valiente
- Language: Spanish
- English title: "I Don't Remember"
- Released: June 1, 2018
- Recorded: 2017
- Genre: Latin pop; reggaeton
- Length: 3:38
- Label: Sony Latin
- Songwriters: Natalia Gutiérrez; Yasmil Marrufo; Rafael Pina; Frank Santofimio; Mario Cáceres; Jon Leone; Germán Hernández; Oscar Hernández; Juan G. Rivera
- Producers: Yasmil Marrufo; Frank Santofimio; Mario Cáceres; Oscarcito; Jon Leone

Thalía singles chronology
"Triángulo" (2017)	"No Me Acuerdo" (2018)	"Me Oyen, Me Escuchan" (2018)

Natti Natasha singles chronology
"Sin Pijama" (2018)	"No Me Acuerdo" (2018)	"Quién Sabe" (2018)

Music video
- "No Me Acuerdo" on YouTube

"No Me Acuerdo" (I Don't Remember) is a song by Mexican singer Thalía and Dominican singer Natti Natasha. It was released on June 1, 2018 as the lead single from Thalía's fifteenth studio album, Valiente (2018). The track was written by Natasha, Rafael Pina, Gaby Music, Germán Hernández, Yasmil Marrufo, Frank Santofimio, Mario Cáceres, Jon Leone and Oscarito, and produced by the latter five. Thalía became the first Mexican artist to hit one billion views on YouTube with "No Me Acuerdo". "No Me Acuerdo" is also one of the best-selling Latin singles in the United States and was certified with 14× Platinum (Latin).

== Commercial performance ==
The song performed well in charts all over the world and it was the most listened song of the summer of 2018 in Latin America. It was certified gold and platinum in Brazil, Mexico, Spain, and the United States.

== Music video ==
The accompanying music video was filmed in Manhattan, New York; it is about a girl having a crazy fun night out with her friends, possibly cheating on her partner, and then the next day pretending not to remember anything of what happened the day before. The video went viral and accumulated more than 1 billion views on YouTube, making her the first Mexican artist to reach that milestone on a single video while also becoming Natasha's third video to achieve this. As of March 2026, the video has over 1.6 billion views on YouTube.

== Live performances ==
Thalía and Natti Natasha first performed the song together during the K Love Live special concert "Las Que Mandan" where they had a mishap with the audio when it shut off. They performed the song again at the 2019 Premios Lo Nuestro Awards but this time in a remix version with Lali after performing Lindo Pero Bruto.

== Charts ==
=== Weekly charts ===
Weekly chart performance for "No Me Acuerdo"
Chart (2018–20)	Peak position
Argentina (Argentina Hot 100)	2
Argentina (Monitor Latino)	2
Bolivia (Monitor Latino)	1
Chile (Monitor Latino)	1
Colombia (National-Report)	90
Costa Rica (Monitor Latino)	2
Dominican Republic (Monitor Latino)	7
Dominican Republic (SODINPRO)	31
Ecuador (Monitor Latino)	1
Ecuador (National-Report)	1
El Salvador (Monitor Latino)	1
Guatemala (Monitor Latino)	1
Honduras (Monitor Latino)	14
Latin America (Monitor Latino)	2
Mexico (Billboard Mexican Airplay)	1
Mexico (Monitor Latino)	1
Nicaragua (Monitor Latino)	2
Panama (Monitor Latino)	4
Paraguay (Monitor Latino)	8
Perú (Monitor Latino)	2
Perú (UNIMPRO)	10
Puerto Rico (Monitor Latino)	5
Spain (PROMUSICAE)	5
Uruguay (Monitor Latino)	1
US Hot Latin Songs (Billboard)	14
US Latin Airplay (Billboard)	19
US Latin Rhythm Airplay (Billboard)	13
Venezuela (National-Report)	1

=== Year-end charts ===
2018 year-end chart performance for "No Me Acuerdo"
Chart (2018)	Position
Argentina (Monitor Latino)	19
Bolivia (Monitor Latino)	11
Chile (Monitor Latino)	10
Costa Rica (Monitor Latino)	23
Dominican Republic (Monitor Latino)	43
Ecuador (Monitor Latino)	9
Ecuador (Soprofon)	8
El Salvador (Monitor Latino)	16
Guatemala (Monitor Latino)	18
Honduras (Monitor Latino)	75
Latin America (Monitor Latino)	21
México (Monitor Latino)	15
Nicaragua (Monitor Latino)	47
Panama (Monitor Latino)	52
Paraguay (Monitor Latino)	33
Perú (Monitor Latino)	20
Puerto Rico (Monitor Latino)	13
Spain (PROMUSICAE)	35
Uruguay (Monitor Latino)	12
US Hot Latin Songs (Billboard)	42
Venezuela (Monitor Latino)	84

2019 year-end chart performance for "No Me Acuerdo"
Chart (2019)	Position
Argentina (Monitor Latino)	46
Bolivia (Monitor Latino)	16
Chile (Monitor Latino)	14
Costa Rica (Monitor Latino)	88
Dominican Republic Pop (Monitor Latino)	14
Ecuador (Monitor Latino)	79
El Salvador (Monitor Latino)	79
Guatemala (Monitor Latino)	58
Honduras Pop (Monitor Latino)	16
Latin America (Monitor Latino)	60
Nicaragua Pop (Monitor Latino)	28
Panama (Monitor Latino)	44
Paraguay Pop (Monitor Latino)	57
Perú (Monitor Latino)	55
Venezuela (Monitor Latino)	68

2020 year-end chart performance for "No Me Acuerdo"
Chart (2020)	Position
Bolivia (Monitor Latino)	96
Chile Pop (Monitor Latino)	42
Dominican Republic Pop (Monitor Latino)	50
Honduras Pop (Monitor Latino)	65
Panama Pop (Monitor Latino)	41
Perú Pop (Monitor Latino)	70
Puerto Rico Pop (Monitor Latino)	86
Venezuela Pop (Monitor Latino)	51

2021 year-end chart performance for "No Me Acuerdo"
Chart (2021)	Position
Chile Pop (Monitor Latino)	42
Honduras Pop (Monitor Latino)	72
Panama Pop (Monitor Latino)	85
Venezuela Pop (Monitor Latino)	100

2022 year-end chart performance for "No Me Acuerdo"
Chart (2022)	Position
Chile Pop (Monitor Latino)	89

== Certifications and sales ==
Certifications and sales for "No Me Acuerdo"
Region	Certification	Certified units/sales
Brazil (Pro-Música Brasil)	Platinum	40,000^{‡}
Mexico (AMPROFON)	Diamond+Platinum	360,000^{‡}
Spain (Promusicae)	3× Platinum	180,000^{‡}
United States (RIAA)	14× Platinum (Latin)	840,000^{‡}
^{‡} Sales+streaming figures based on certification alone.

== Covers ==
In November 2020, the South Korean girl group Purple Kiss covered the song as part of their international medley of covers of the top female vocalist from each country.
