= Heart of Brazil =

Studio album by Eddie Daniels
- Released: 2018

Heart of Brazil is an album by Eddie Daniels, released in 2018.

== Track listing ==
1. "Lôro (Parrot)" (5:08)
2. "Baião Malandro (Badass Baião)" (5:51)
3. "Água e Vinho (Water and Wine)" (6:07)
4. "Ciranda (Folk Dance)" (5:11)
5. "Folia (Revelry)" (4:23)
6. "Maracatú (Sacred Rhythm)" (5:52)
7. "Adágio" 5:59
8. "Tango Nova (New Tango)" (5:45)
9. "Chôro" (6:02)
10. "Tango" (4:40)
11. "Cigana (Gypsy Woman)" (7:36)
12. "Trem Noturno (Night Train)" (7:44)
13. "Auto-Retrato (Self-Portrait)" (6:44)
