= Joana Marte =

Brazilian rock band

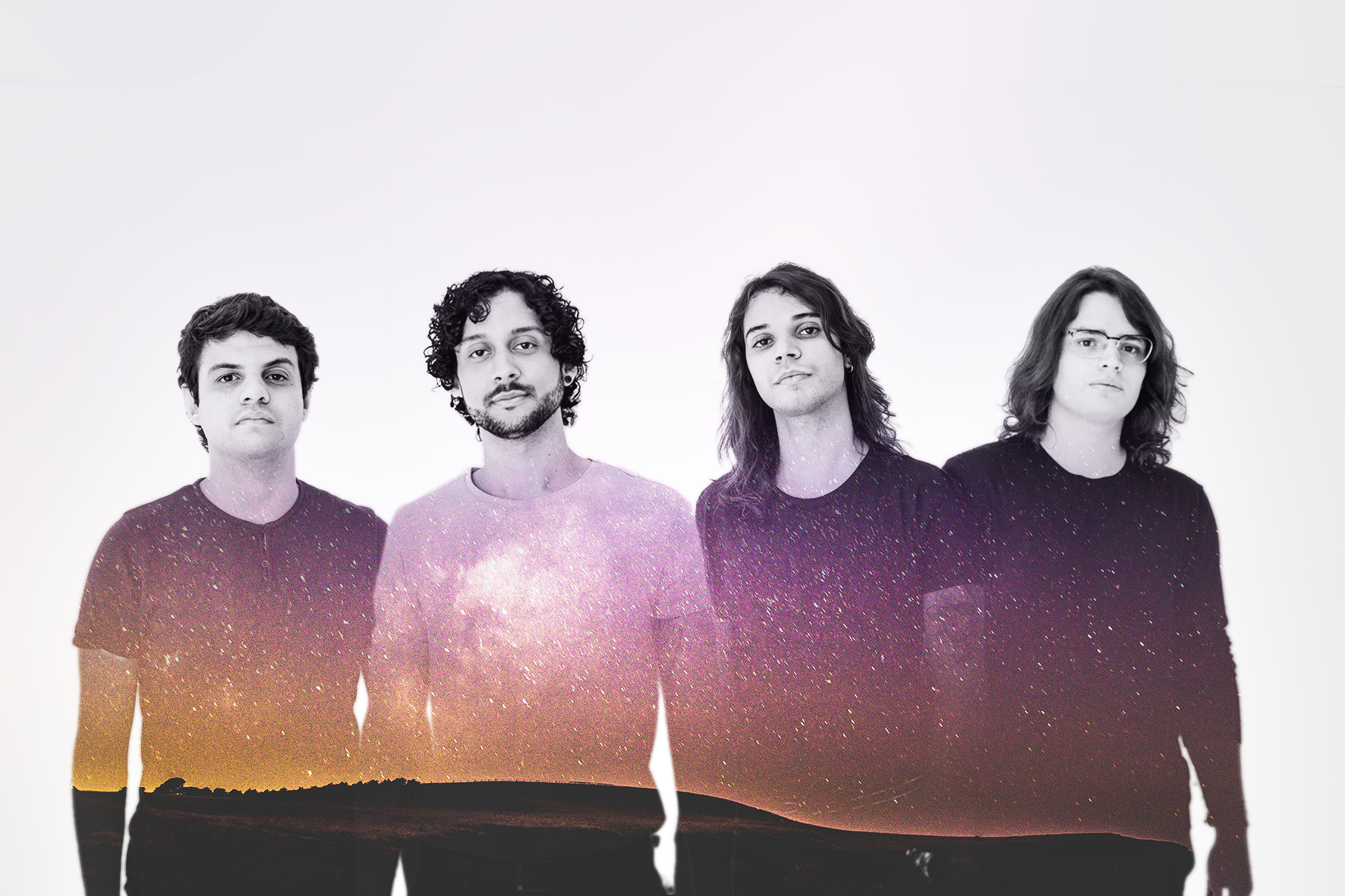
- Promotional picture of the De Outro Lugar time

Background information
- Origin: Belém, Pará, Brazil
- Genres: Alternative rock, psychedelic rock, progressive rock
- Years active: 2015–present
- Labels: Urtiga
- Members: Rubens Guilhon; Bruno Azevedo; Leo Chaves
- Past members: Davi Cosme; João Pedro Normando
- Website: www.joanamarte.com

Joana Marte (Portuguese pronunciation: [ʒuˈɐnɐ ˈmaʁtʃi]) is a Brazilian rock band founded in 2015 in Belém, Pará, by vocalist/guitarist Rubens Guilhon and drummer Bruno Azevedo. They consider themselves to be an alternative rock band, but they're also considered a psychedelic and progressive rock act.

== History ==
The band was founded in 2015 in Belém, capital of the state of Pará by Rubens Guilhon (vocals, guitar) and Bruno Azevedo (drums, percussion). The first bassist, Davi Cosme, who named the band, performed with them for only one show before moving to the United States to study. He was replaced by Leo Chaves. The band's first live performances were far from their hometown, in a tour in São Paulo and Avaré (São Paulo state).

On 8 June 2018, they released their debut album, De Outro Lugar, with keyboardist João Pedro Normando as a fourth member. The release was preceded by the double single "Inimigos"/"Valsa", released in May.

On 29 August 2019, they released the single "Egresso". In February 2020, no longer having Normando in the line-up, they released "Tempinho", which would be part of their sophomore album, then expected for the first semester of the year. The single, as did "Egresso", had elements of Brazilian music, signalizing a different direction from their first album.

In March, it was announced that they were running for a spot at Lollapalooza Brasil, which would take place in April de 2020, but the event was postponed to December and, later, to September 2021. In May, they were selected to receive an emergency fund organized by Itaú Cultural in order to assist artists financially affected by the COVID-19 pandemic. The second album is expected for the first semester of 2021.

== Musical style ==
The band defines itself as an alternative rock band in their official website, while recognizing elements of jazz, samba, classical music, psychedelic music, baião and waltz in its music, besides progressive and psychedelic rock themselves. The group is influenced by Tame Impala, Pink Floyd, Os Mutantes and Radiohead.

== Members ==
=== Current members ===
- Rubens Guilhon — vocals, guitar (2015–present)
- Leo Chaves — bass (2015–present)
- Bruno Azevedo — drums and percussion (2015–present)

=== Former members ===
- João Pedro Normando — keyboards (?)
- Davi Cosme — bass (2015)

== Discography ==
=== EPs ===
- Distante do Irreal (2017)

=== Albums ===
- De Outro Lugar (2018)

=== Singles ===
- "Inimigos" / "Valsa" (2018)
- "Egresso" (2019)
- "Tempinho" (2020)
