= Xiomara Fortuna =

Dominican singer and composer (born 1956)

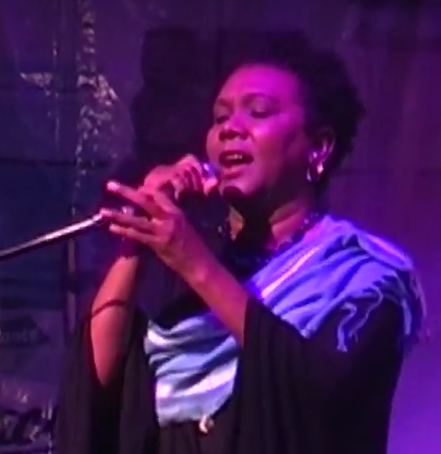
- Fortuna in 2011

Background information
- Born: 1959 (age 66–67); Monte Cristi Province
- Origin: Dominican Republic
- Years active: 1985–present

Xiomara Fortuna (born 1959, Monte Cristi, Dominican Republic) is a Dominican singer and composer. She is known for her deep voice and her work in the genres of world music, música raíz (a Dominican style combining rock, jazz and afro-Dominican rhythms), jazz and contemporary music.

== Biography ==
Xiomara Fortuna was born in the province of Monte Cristi, in the northwest region of the Dominican Republic, at the border with Haiti

Her mother introduced her to music. Her first exposure to music was Dominican folk music, including vocal and dance. As a youth, she was interested in Trova and social justice-themed music. She wrote her first songs as a teenager.

After high school, she enrolled in the Universidad Autónoma de Santo Domingo (UASD). She began performing live in Santo Domingo. She performed in Kaliumbe, where she honed her musical style inspired by traditional Caribbean music, specifically the music of the Dominican Republic and Haiti. She lives in Santo Domingo and at Rancho Ecológico El Campeche she founded In 2010, a group from Gettysburg College visited her ranch.

She has performed in Switzerland, Cuba, Russian and France. She has collaborated with Archie Shepp and performed with Miriam Makeba and Toure Kunda.

== Discography ==
- De la Loma al Llano (1985)
- Balbuceos (1996)
- Pan Music and Música Raíces (1997)
- Kumbajei (2001)
- Ella ta' í (2002)
- Tonada para un Querer (2004)
- La Calle Será La Calle(2009)
- Paseando (2010)
- Pa Cantarte a tí (2010)

== In popular culture ==
Xiomara Fortuna is mentioned in Elizabeth Acevedo's young adult novel Clap When You Land: "Tía puts her bag away, turns on the kitchen radio / Xiomara Fortuna's voice bellows out, & soon / we are both singing along" (p. 313)

== Sources ==
- Article on Xiomara Fortuna (in English)
