= Piso 21 =

Colombian Latin pop group

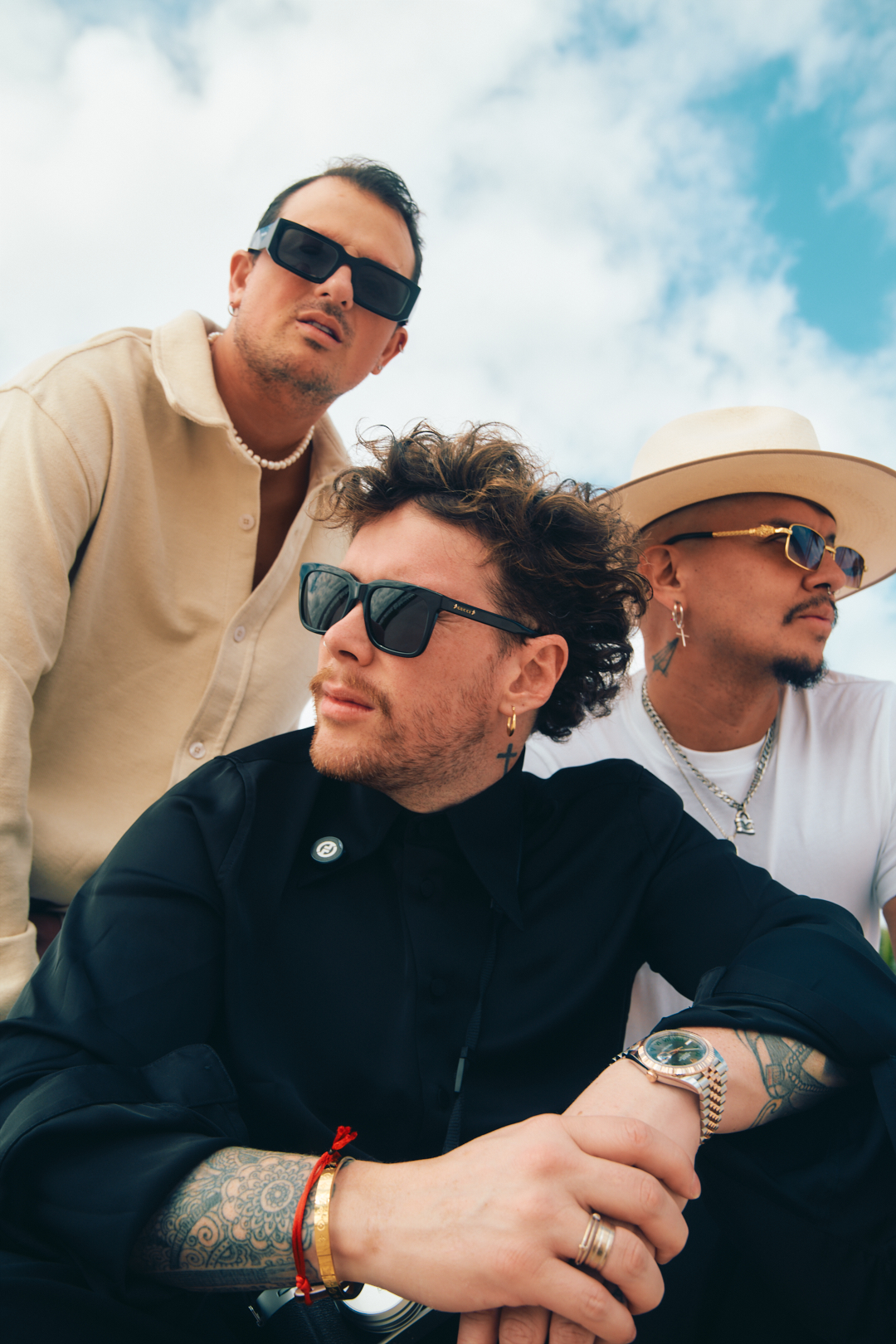

Background information
- Origin: Medellín, Colombia
- Genres: Latin pop; reggaeton
- Years active: 2007–present
- Labels: Warner Latina; Tres Sietes LLC; Warner Mexico; Warner Colombia; Interscope
- Members: Juan David Huertas Clavijo; Pablo Mejía Bermúdez; David Escobar Gallego
- Past members: David Lorduy Hernández; Juan David M. Castaño
- Website: piso-21.com

Piso 21 is a Colombian Latin pop group. Their singles "Me Llamas", "Besándote" and "Déjala Que Vuelva" were hits in their home country, Latin America and Spain.

== Career ==
Piso 21 is a Colombian group composed of Pablo Mejía (Pablito), Juan David Huertas (El Profe), and David Escobar (Dim), with Colombian artists Juan David Castaño (El Llane) and David Lorduy Hernández (Lorduy) having been members of the group in past throughout two different time durations. The name Piso 21 derives from an elevator in a building in Medellín, Colombia, which had 21 floors. The group has toured extensively in South America and overseas.

=== 2007–2013: Formation and debut ===
The group formed in 2007, but it was not until 2012 that the group started receiving widespread recognition. With songs like: "Vagones Vacíos", "Ángel Mortal" and "Correr El Riesgo", the group's fame in Colombia steadily grew. Later in 2012, thanks to the success of their debut studio album Piso 21. The group was nominated for Best New Artist in the Latin Grammy Awards that same year.

=== 2014–2015: Transition to urban music ===
In 2014, Piso 21 released the single "Suele Suceder" featuring Puerto Rican singer Nicky Jam. The song was a commercial success in Latin America and reached the top 20 in the Colombian Monitor Latino charts. The song also became the group's first charting single in the US charts built for Latin audiences by Billboard, where it peaked at number 29 on the Tropical Songs chart. The following year in 2015, the group released the singles: "Quítate La Pena", "Delicia" and "Hoy" featuring Chilean singer Florencia Arenas.

=== 2016–2018: Warner Music Latina and Ubuntu ===
In 2016, Piso 21 signed with Warner Music Latina, and later on in the year, released the single "Me Llamas", which ended up reaching the top 40 in several countries throughout Latin America and became their most successful single to date at the time. On 2 December 2016, an official remix featuring Colombian singer Maluma was released. The remix helped further add to the song's momentum.

In 2016, they became one of the most popular groups in Mexico, having 4 concerts fully sold out.

In early 2017, they released the single "Besándote" which like their previous single, ended up becoming a widespread commercial success, reaching the top 40 in several countries in Latin America. On 1 September 2017, the group released an official remix featuring British singer Anne-Marie to celebrate their YouTube channel surpassing over a million subscribers. On 19 October 2017, they released the single "Déjala Que Vuelva" featuring Manuel Turizo. The song became an instant success across Latin America, where it topped multiple Spotify charts in the region and became certified Gold in Colombia just merely two weeks after its release. On 10 November 2017, they released the single "Tu Héroe". Which later ended up peaking at number seven on the Paraguayan Monitor Latino charts. The song was then followed by the single "Adrenalina" on 1 December 2017, which featured Spanish rapper Maikel Delacalle.

In early 2018, Piso 21 collaborated with Argentinian singer Paulo Londra on the single "Te Amo", which was released on 15 March 2018. On 11 May 2018 the group released the single "La Vida Sin Ti" to coincide with the release of their second studio album Ubuntu. Later in the year, on 14 September 2018, they released the song "Punto Suspensivos", as the eighth single from their second studio album Ubuntu. The group then released the single "Te Vi" with Venezuelan singer Micro TDH on 14 December 2018.

=== 2019–2024: Lorduy era ===
In early 2019, on the 3 February, one of the founding members of the group Juan David Castaño (El Llane), announced his departure from the group to pursue a career as a solo artist. He was subsequently replaced by the up-and-coming Colombian artist David Lorduy Hernández (Lorduy).

In April 2020, the group released the compilation album Canciones Que Nos Marcaron, featuring ten songs from their early years, including "Suele Suceder", "Quítate La Pena" and "Delicia".

In March 2021, the group released their fourth album, El Amor en los Tiempos del Perreo, whose title references Gabriel García Márquez's novel Love in the Time of Cholera. The album compiled singles released since 2019, including "Una Vida Para Recordar" with Myke Towers, "Mami" with Black Eyed Peas, "Pa' Olvidarme De Ella" with Christian Nodal, "Dulcecitos" with Zion & Lennox and "Más De La Una" with Maluma.

On October 13, 2022, Piso 21 released their fifth album "777". Although relatively new, this album is just as popular as their others. The 16-track album featured collaborations with Manuel Turizo, Carín León, Danny Ocean, Ñejo, Santa Fe Klan, Totoy El Frío and Gigolo y La Exce, and entered the top 10 of Spotify's global album debut chart.

In September 2023, the group made its first tour of the United States, the Los Muchachos Tour, with dates in New York City, Miami, Orlando, Houston and Dallas. On 9 November 2023, they released Los Muchachos, featuring Nicky Jam, Maluma, Ryan Castro, Gabito Ballesteros, Elena Rose, Tezzel and Fainal & Shako.

In October 2024, they released 2.1, a 14-track album recorded over the course of a year in Colombia and the United States, with guest appearances by Ozuna and Wisin. It was accompanied by El Camino al 2.1, a 27-minute documentary short about the making of the record. Its single "La Misión", with Wisin, reached number one on the Billboard Latin Pop Airplay chart in 2024.

=== 2025–2026: Trio and Trescender ===
In January 2025, Lorduy announced his departure from the group, and the remaining members confirmed they would continue as a trio without a replacement. On 6 February 2025, they released "Volver" with Marc Anthony and Beéle, their first release as a trio. The song won Best Pop/Rhythmic Song at the 2025 Premios Juventud and was nominated for Song/Composition of the Year at the 2026 Premios Nuestra Tierra. In July 2025, the group performed "Más Casa, Más Fama", the official theme song of the third season of La casa de los famosos México.

Ahead of their next album, they released the singles "Como El Sol" with Bacilos (October 2025), "Por Si Mañana No Estoy", a bolero with Andrés Cepeda (December 2025), "Te Elijo" with Yami Safdie (February 2026) and "Nunca Me Lo Esperé" with Lasso (March 2026).

On 12 March 2026, Piso 21 released Trescender, their eighth album and their first as a trio. The title blends tres ("three"), for the number of members, with trascender ("to transcend"). The 12-track album features Marc Anthony, Beéle, Lasso, Yami Safdie, Juan Duque, Bacilos, Fonseca and Andrés Cepeda, and was the group's first release on its own label, Tres Sietes, distributed by Warner Music México.

=== 2026–present: Interscope Records ===
On 14 September 2026, Piso 21 signed a global distribution deal with Interscope Records, under which the group continues to release music through Tres Sietes. On 18 September 2026, they released "Segunda Cita" with Micro TDH and Gangsta, a follow-up to their 2018 collaboration "Te Vi", which surpassed one billion streams on Spotify.

== Discography ==
=== Albums ===
==== Studio albums ====
List of studio albums, with selected details, chart positions, sales, and certifications
Title	Studio album details	Peak chart positions			Certifications
Title	Studio album details	US Latin	US Latin Pop	SPA	Certifications
Piso 21	Released: 12 July 2012; Label: Star Arsis Entertainment Group; Formats: CD, digital download	—	—	—	
Ubuntu	Released: 11 May 2018; Label: Warner Music Latina; Formats: CD, digital download	13	5	27	RIAA: Platinum (Latin); AMPROFON: 3× Platinum
El Amor en los Tiempos del Perreo	Released: 19 March 2021; Label: Warner Music Latina; Formats: CD, digital download	—	9	88	RIAA: Gold (Latin)
777	Released: 13 October 2022; Label: Warner Music México; Formats: CD, digital download	—	12	—	RIAA: Gold (Latin)
Los Muchachos	Released: 9 November 2023; Label: Warner Music México; Formats: CD, digital download	—	—	—	
2.1	Released: 18 October 2024; Label: Warner Music México; Formats: Digital download, streaming	—	—	—	
Trescender	Released: 12 March 2026; Label: Tres Sietes / Warner Music México; Formats: Digital download, streaming	—	—	—	

==== Compilation albums ====
List of compilation albums, with selected details, chart positions, sales, and certifications
Title	Studio album details	Peak chart positions	
Title	Studio album details	US Latin	US Latin Pop
Canciones Que Nos Marcaron	Released: 14 April 2020; Label: Star Arsis Entertainment Group; Formats: CD, digital download	—	—

=== Singles ===
==== As lead artist ====
List of singles as lead artist, with selected chart positions and certifications, showing year released and album name
Title	Year	Peak chart positions							Certifications	Album
Title	Year	COL	ARG	MEX	SPA	US Latin	US Latin Airplay	US Latin Pop	Certifications	Album
"Dame Tu Corazon (Uh - Uh)"	2013	—	—	—	—	—	—	—		Canciones Que Nos Marcaron
"Suele Suceder" (featuring Nicky Jam)	2014	—	—	—	—	—	—	—		Canciones Que Nos Marcaron
"Hoy" (with Florencia Arenas)	2015	—	—	—	—	—	—	—		Non-album single
"Quítale La Pena"	2015	—	—	—	—	—	—	—		Canciones Que Nos Marcaron
"Delicia"	2015	—	—	—	—	—	—	—		Canciones Que Nos Marcaron
"Me Llamas" (solo or featuring Maluma)	2016	9	12	37	18	32	39	14	AMPROFON: Diamond+4× Platinum; CAPIF: 2× Platinum; FIMI: Gold; PROMUSICAE: 4× Platinum; RIAA: 6× Platinum (Latin)	Ubuntu
"Besándote" (solo or featuring Anne-Marie)	2017	11	9	39	39	—	—	24	AMPROFON: 2× Platinum; CAPIF: Gold; PROMUSICAE: Platinum; RIAA: 2× Platinum (Latin)	Ubuntu
"Déjala Que Vuelva" (featuring Manuel Turizo)	2017	7	7	3	13	16	8	6	ASINCOL: 2× Platinum; AMPROFON: Diamond+3× Platinum; PROMUSICAE: 2× Platinum; RIAA: 11× Platinum (Latin)	Ubuntu
"Tu Héroe"	2017	—	—	—	—	—	—	—		Ubuntu
"Adrenalina" (featuring Maikel Delacalle)	2017	—	—	—	—	—	—	—		Ubuntu
"Te Amo" (with Paulo Londra)	2018	7	8	25	46	—	—	—	ASINCOL: Platinum; PROMUSICAE: Gold	Ubuntu
"La Vida Sin Ti"	2018	14	13	14	57	44	25	11	RIAA: Platinum (Latin)	Ubuntu
"Puntos Suspensivos"	2018	48	25	9	—	—	—	—	AMPROFON: 2× Platinum	Ubuntu
"Te Vi" (with Micro TDH)	2018	5	18	10	28	28	32	17	AMPROFON: 3× Platinum; PROMUSICAE: Platinum; RIAA: 12× Platinum (Latin)	Non-album single
"Una Vida Para Recordar" (with Myke Towers)	2019	8	85	10	69	46	28	15	ASINCOL: Platinum; RIAA: Platinum (Latin)	El Amor en los Tiempos del Perreo
"Mami" (with Black Eyed Peas)	2019	33	—	— (Note: "Mami" did not enter the Billboard Mexico Airplay chart, but peaked at number 45 on the Mexico Espanol Airplay chart.)	—	—	—	—	ASINCOL: Gold; RIAA: Gold (Latin)	El Amor en los Tiempos del Perreo
"Pa' Olvidarme De Ella" (with Christian Nodal)	2019	83	—	12	—	—	—	—	ASINCOL: Platinum; RIAA: 7× Platinum (Latin)	El Amor en los Tiempos del Perreo
"Dulcecitos" (with Zion & Lennox)	2020	—	—	47	—	—	—	—	RIAA: Gold (Latin)	El Amor en los Tiempos del Perreo
"Tomar Distancia"	2020	—	—	9	—	—	—	—		Non-album single
"Querida" (with Feid)	2020	—	—	13	—	—	—	12		El Amor en los Tiempos del Perreo
"Más De La Una" (with Maluma)	2020	11	74	8	—	34	13	3	RIAA: Gold (Latin)	El Amor en los Tiempos del Perreo
"Tan Bonita"	2021	—	48	11	—	—	—	—		El Amor en los Tiempos del Perreo
"Nadie La Controla"	2021	—	—	—	—	—	—	—		777
"Equivocado" (with Santa Fe Klan)	2022	—	—	—	—	—	—	—		777
"Los Cachos" (with Manuel Turizo)	2022	—	—	—	85	—	—	—	* RIAA: 3× Platinum (Latin)	777
"La Misión" (with Wisin)	2024	—	—	—	—	—	—	1		2.1
"Me Siento High"	2024	—	—	—	—	—	—	—		2.1
"Fichaje del Año" (with Ozuna)	2024	—	—	—	—	—	—	—		2.1
"Volver" (with Marc Anthony and Beéle)	2025	—	—	—	54	—	—	—		
"Más Casa, Más Fama"	2025	—	—	—	—	—	—	—		Non-album single
"Como El Sol" (with Bacilos)	2025									
"Por Si Mañana No Estoy" (with Andrés Cepeda)	2025									
"Te Elijo" (with Yami Safdie)	2026	—	—	—	—	—	—	—		Trescender
"Nunca Me Lo Esperé" (with Lasso)	2026	—	—	—	—	—	—	—		Trescender
"Regalito" (with Juan Duque)	2026	—	—	—	—	—	—	—		Trescender
"Segunda Cita" (with Micro TDH and Gangsta)	2026	—	—	—	—	—	—	—		Non-album single
"—" denotes a recording that did not chart or was not released in that territory.

==== As featured artist ====
List of singles as featured artist, with selected chart positions and certifications, showing year released and album name
Title	Year	Peak chart positions									Certifications	Album
Title	Year	COL	ARG	AUT	GER	MEX	SPA	SWI	US Dance	US Latin Pop	Certifications	Album
"Ando Buscando" (Carlos Baute featuring Piso 21)	2016	65	—	—	—	40	17	—	—	—	PROMUSICAE: 2× Platinum	Non-album singles
"Bailame Despacio" (Remix) (Xantos featuring Dynell and Piso 21)	2017	—	—	—	—	—	—	—	—	—		Non-album singles
"El Rehén" (Xantos featuring Piso 21)	2017	69	—	—	—	—	—	—	—	—		Non-album singles
"La Llave" (Pablo Alborán featuring Piso 21)	2018	71	—	—	—	14	42	—	—	36	PROMUSICAE: Gold	Prometo
"Oh Child" (Robin Schulz featuring Piso 21)	2018	—	—	20	19	— (Note: "Oh Child" did not enter the Billboard Mexico Airplay chart, but peaked at number 18 on the Billboard Mexico Ingles Airplay chart.)	—	84	46	—	BVMI: Gold; IFPI AUT: Gold	Non-album single
"Voy Por Ti" (Cali & El Dandee featuring Piso 21)	2019	—	—	—	—	—	—	—	—	—	RIAA: Gold (Latin)	Colegio
"Luna Llena" (Lyanno Junto and Jerry Di featuring Piso 21)	2020	—	—	—	—	—	—	—	—	—		Non-album single
"Dónde Estas (Remix)" (Khea featuring Piso 21)	2020	—	45	—	—	—	—	—	—	—		Non-album single
"—" denotes a recording that did not chart or was not released in that territory.

== Awards and nominations ==
Year	Award	Category	Nominated work	Result	Ref.
2025	Premios Juventud	Best Pop/Rhythmic Song	"Volver" (with Marc Anthony and Beéle)	Won	
2026	Premios Nuestra Tierra	Song/Composition of the Year	"Volver" (with Marc Anthony and Beéle)	Nominated	
2026	Premios Nuestra Tierra	Pop Duo or Group	Piso 21	Nominated	
