= List of number-one songs of 2018 (Venezuela) =

This is a list of the number-one songs of 2018 in Venezuela. The airplay charts are published by Monitor Latino, based on airplay across radio stations in Venezuela utilizing the Radio Tracking Data, LLC in real time. Charts are compiled from Monday to Sunday. Besides the General chart, Monitor Latino publishes "Nacional", "Latino", "Pop", "Anglo", "Urbano", "Tradicional", "Tropical" and "Vallenato" charts.

== Chart history (Monitor Latino) ==
Issue Date	Song	Artist(s)	Ref.
January 7	"Algo loco"	Rafa Ribeiro	
January 14	"Mi persona favorita"	Calle Ciega	
January 21	"Aquella noche"	Kent James	
January 28	"Habibi"	Gustavo Elis	
February 4	"A mi manera (Remix)"	Chucho Flash ft. Farruko & Sixto Rein	
February 11	"Mercedes"	Omar Acedo	
February 18	"Corazón"	Maluma ft. Nego do Borel	
February 26	"Cásate conmigo"	Silvestre Dangond ft. Nicky Jam	
March 4	"Chama"	Dani Baron ft. Omar Koonze	
March 11	"Hasta el ombligo"	Chyno Miranda ft. Zion & Lennox	
March 18	"Todo comienza en la Disco"	Wisin ft. Daddy Yankee ft. Yandel	
March 25	"Besas tan bien"	Nelson Arrieta	
April 1	"Lárgate"	Alta Tensión	
April 8	"Ay amor"	Los Muchachos	
April 15	"Cherry"	Arán One	
April 22	"Tu boquita"	EstoeSPosdata ft. Chyno Miranda	
April 29	"El préstamo"	Maluma	
May 6	"Cherry"	Arán One	
May 13	"Como en Las Vegas"	Olga Tañón ft. Chyno Miranda	
May 20	"El préstamo"	Maluma	
May 27	"No tengas miedo"	OBS	
June 3	"Como yo"	Sanluis ft. Silvestre Dangond	
June 10	"El préstamo"	Maluma	
June 17	"Natural y loco"	Fabián ft. Gustavo Elis & Kent	
June 24	"Como en Las Vegas"	Olga Tañón ft. Chyno Miranda	
July 1	"Hoy tengo tiempo"	Carlos Vives	
July 8	"Déjame verte"	Shey	
July 15	"Tú sabes que te quiero"	Chucho Flash ft. Arcángel	
July 22	"Verano"	Víctor David	
July 29	"Chama"	Dani Baron ft. Omar Koonze	
August 5	"Quisiera alejarme"	Wisin ft. Ozuna	
August 12	"Pecar contigo"	Aran One	
August 19	"El culpable"	Alta Tensión ft. Los Boys	
August 26	"Justicia"	Silvestre Dangond ft. Natti Natasha	
September 2	"Pa tras"	Chucho Flash	
September 9	"Si tú me miras"	EstoeSPosdata ft. La Melodia Perfecta	
September 16	"Tapita borrá"	Sixto Rein	
September 23	"Me provoca"	Chyno Miranda	
September 30	"Prácticamente"	Omar Koonze	
October 6	"Prácticamente"	Omar Koonze	
October 13	"Prácticamente"	Omar Koonze	
October 20	"Prácticamente"	Omar Koonze	
October 27	"El peor"	Chyno Miranda ft. J Balvin	

== Chart history (Record Report) ==
Issue Date	Song	Artist(s)	Ref.
February 10	"Mercedes"	Omar Acedo	
February 17	"Mercedes"	Omar Acedo	
February 24	"Te haré feliz"	A Distancia	
March 3	"Abre los ojos"	Dani Baron	
March 10	"Me enamoré"	Roberto Antonio	
March 17	"Muévete como las olas"	AnnyBell	
March 24	"Besas tan bien"	Nelson Arrieta	
March 31	"Besas tan bien"	Nelson Arrieta	
April 7	"Cherry"	Arán One	
April 14	"Zoom Zoom"	Juan Miguel ft. La Melodía Perfecta	
April 21	"Destrozo"	Porfi Baloa	
April 28	"Pa' que te enamores"	Bitoqueao	
May 5	"Bipolar"	2020 Music	
May 12	"Hasta el ombligo"	Chyno Miranda, Zion & Lennox	
May 19	"Eres tan bonita"	Jesus & Yorky	
May 26	"Amigos con beneficios"	Juan Miguel	
June 2	"Como yo"	Sanluis y Silvestre Dangond	
June 9	"Si esto no es amor"	Sergioandré	
June 16	"Buum Buum"	Melodía Perfecta	
June 23	"Como en Las Vegas"	Olga Tañón & Chyno Miranda	
June 30	"Parcera"	Thomas the Latin Boy & Farina	
July 7	"Yo tengo la llave"	Stefan & Juan Miguel	
July 14	"Tú sabes que te quiero"	Chucho Flash & Arcángel	
