= Déjala Que Vuelva =

Single by Piso 21 featuring Manuel Turizo

from the album Ubuntu
- Language: Spanish
- English title: "Let Her Come Back"
- Released: 20 October 2017
- Length: 3:40
- Label: Warner Mexico
- Songwriters: Juan Diego Medina; Juan David Castaño; Julián Turizo; Eq the Equaliser; Juan David Huertas; Jhonny Sánchez Olivera; Mosty; David Escobar Gallego; Pablo MeijaErick Andres Celis Marin
- Producers: Mosty; Eq the Equaliser; ErickAnt

Piso 21 singles chronology
""El Rehén"" (2017)	"Déjala Que Vuelva" (2017)	""Tu Héroe"" (2017)

Manuel Turizo singles chronology
"Bésame" (2017)	"Déjala Que Vuelva" (2017)	"Esperándote" (2017)

Music video
- "Déjala Que Vuelva" on YouTube

"Déjala Que Vuelva" (transl. "Let Her Come Back") is a song by Colombian band Piso 21 featuring Colombian singer Manuel Turizo, from their second studio album Ubuntu (2018). It was released on 20 October 2017 by the Mexican division of the Warner Music Group as the album's third single. The song was written by the band, Juan Diego Medina, Julián Turizo, Manuel Turizo, and its producers Mosty and Eq the Equaliser. It became an instant success across Latin America, where it reached the top 10 in many countries and was certified gold in Colombia two weeks after its release.

== Music video ==
The music video for "Déjala Que Vuelva" premiered on 19 October 2017 on Piso 21's YouTube account. Filmed in Medellín, Colombia, it was directed by JP Valencia of 36 Grados. As of October 2025, the song has been viewed over 2.2 billion times on YouTube.

== Track listing ==
Digital download
No.	Title	Writer(s)	Producer(s)	Length
1.	"Déjala Que Vuelva" (featuring Manuel Turizo)	Juan Diego Medina; Juan David Castaño; Julián Turizo; Eq the Equaliser; Juan David Huertas; Mosty; David Escobar Gallego; Pablo Meija; Manuel Turizo; Erick Andres Celis Marin	Mosty; Eq the Equaliser; ErickAnt	3:40

== Charts ==
Chart (2017–18)	Peak position
Argentina (Monitor Latino)	7
Bolivia (Monitor Latino)	1
Chile (Monitor Latino)	1
Colombia (Monitor Latino)	5
Colombia (National-Report)	7
Costa Rica (Monitor Latino)	2
Ecuador (National-Report)	6
El Salvador (Monitor Latino)	2
Guatemala (Monitor Latino)	4
Mexico (Billboard)	3
Nicaragua (Monitor Latino)	5
Panama (Monitor Latino)	4
Paraguay (Monitor Latino)	1
Peru (Monitor Latino)	7
Spain (PROMUSICAE)	13
Uruguay (Monitor Latino)	6
US Hot Latin Songs (Billboard)	16
US Tropical Airplay (Billboard)	1
US Latin Airplay (Billboard)	8
US Latin Rhythm Airplay (Billboard)	7
Venezuela (National-Report)	68

=== Year-end charts ===
Chart (2018)	Position
Argentina (Monitor Latino)	16
Spain (PROMUSICAE)	37
US Hot Latin Songs (Billboard)	46

== Certifications ==
Region	Certification	Certified units/sales
Colombia (ASINCOL)	2× Platinum	
Mexico (AMPROFON)	Diamond+3× Platinum	480,000^{‡}
Spain (Promusicae)	3× Platinum	180,000^{‡}
United States (RIAA)	11× Platinum (Latin)	660,000^{‡}
Streaming
Chile (Profovi)	Diamond	52,000,000
^{‡} Sales+streaming figures based on certification alone.
