= De Outro Lugar =

Studio album by Joana Marte
- Released: 8 June 2018
- Studio: Rubens Guilhon home studio Estúdio Jungle (all drums and parts of the bass)
- Genre: Alternative rock, progressive rock, psychedelic rock
- Length: 29:56
- Language: Portuguese
- Label: Urtiga/Trattore
- Producer: Rubens Guilhon

Joana Marte chronology
Distante do Irreal (2017)	De Outro Lugar (2018)

Singles from De Outro Lugar
- 1. "Inimigos" / "Valsa" Released: May 2018

De Outro Lugar ([di outɾu luɡaʁ]) (From Another Place) is the debut album by Brazilian rock band Joana Marte, released on 8 June 2018 and produced by their vocalist and guitarist Rubens Guilhon, who also wrote most of the songs. When the album was already recorded and almost entirely mixed, it was re-recorded and remixed a second time.

The release was preceded by the double single "Inimigos"/"Valsa", released in May; the name of the album is taken from the lyrics of the former.

== Song information ==
"Pobre Menino" is the oldest song in the album, and the one that had the most versions between the first and the final ones. Its lyrics express the belief that we don't live in a true democracy. "De Ré", created around a guitar riff in drop D, features Renan Chady on vocals since Guilhon wanted "a harsher voice" and "more aggressiveness in the song's sound".

"Novo Lar" is the most recent song and is a tribute to Guilhon's late father. "Retrato de Nós", which made it to the album with a different structure and lyrics than those of its previous versions, features saxophonist Felipe Ricardo. "Lucidez" was created around a jam done by the band and was inspired by works of Josh Klinghoffer and John Frusciante (around that time the current and former guitarists of Red Hot Chili Peppers, respectively; nowadays they have switched places). It features Maria Rosa Lima on vocals. The closing track "Desconexão" is a compilation of "almost entirely unconnected sentences" that actually compose a dialogue that could be between two people or between a person and their own mind.

== Track listing ==
All tracks are written by Rubens Guilhon, except for "Valsa", by Bruno Azevedo

No.	Title	Length
1.	"Pobre Menino" (Poor Boy)	4:38
2.	"Inimigos" (Enemies)	4:43
3.	"De Ré (Note: It's a word play with "ré", which can mean both the D note and reversing.)"	4:10
4.	"Novo Lar (Janela)" (New Home (Window))	3:27
5.	"Retrato de Nós" (Portrait of Us)	5:36
6.	"Lucidez" (Lucidity)	3:12
7.	"Valsa" (Waltz)	4:28
8.	"Desconexão" (Disconnection)	0:49
Total length:		29:56

== Personnel ==
- Rubens Guilhon — vocals, guitar, production
- Leo Chaves — bass
- João Pedro Normando — keyboard
- Bruno Azevedo — drums

=== Guest performances ===
- Renan Chady — vocals on "De Ré"
- Maria Rosa Lima — vocals on "Lucidez"
- Felipe Ricardo — saxophone on "Retrato de Nós"

=== Technical personnel ===
- Paulo Rosa — recording of drums and parts of the bass
- Kleber Chaar — mastering
