= Ubuntu (album) =

Studio album by Piso 21
- Released: May 11, 2018
- Recorded: 2016–2018
- Genre: Reggaeton; trap; urban pop; Latin pop; pop rock
- Length: 43:17
- Language: Spanish
- Label: Warner Music Latina
- Producer: Sky; Ovy On The Drums; Tainy; ICON Music; Mosty

Piso 21 chronology
Piso 21 (2012)	Ubuntu (2018)	Canciones Que Nos Marcaron (2020)

Singles from Ubuntu
- 1. "Me Llamas" Released: 8 July 2016; 2. "Besándote" Released: 21 April 2017; 3. "Déjala Que Vuelva" Released: 19 October 2017; 4. "Tu Héroe" Released: 10 November 2017; 5. "Adrenalina" Released: 1 December 2017; 6. "Te Amo" Released: 15 March 2018; 7. "La Vida Sin Ti" Released: 11 May 2018; 8. "Puntos Suspensivos" Released: 14 September 2018

Ubuntu is the second studio album by Colombian group Piso 21. It was released on May 11, 2018 through Warner Music Latina. It is the most successful album of the band being Sky the general producer the production.

The album is characterized by the consolidation of the group based on its new urban style, while retaining its romantic essence as it was on their first album. There is a fusion with other rhythms such as trap and the use of African, folk and urban music as variety.

Was supported by eight singles: "Me Llamas", "Besándote", "Déjala Que Vuelva", "Tu Héroe", "Adrenalina", "Te Amo", "La Vida Sin Ti" and "Puntos Suspensivo". It is the last album by the group to fully have Juan David Castaño (El Llane) as lead vocalist. The special guests of Manuel Turizo, Paulo Londra, Maikel Delacalle, Fonseca, Zion & Lennox and Xantos are included.

== Promotion ==
=== Singles ===
On 8 July 2016, the album's lead single, "Me Llamas", was released digitally on music stores and streaming services. A notable remix of the song featuring fellow Colombian singer Maluma was released on 2 December 2016. The song peaked at number 32 on the Billboard Hot Latin Songs chart. Where it became the group's first charting single on the chart. The song peaked in the top ten of various Monitor Latino charts in Latin America.

"Besándote" was released digitally on music stores and streaming services on 21 April 2017, as the album's second single. A notable remix featuring British singer Anne-Marie was released on 1 September 2017. The song peaked at number 24 on the Billboard Latin Pop Songs chart. The song peaked in the top ten of various Monitor Latino charts in Latin America.

"Déjala Que Vuelva" was released digitally on music stores and streaming services on 19 October 2017, as the album's third single. The song peaked at number 16 on the US Hot Latin Songs chart. It also notably peaked at number one on the Billboard Tropical Songs chart where it became their first number one on any Billboard chart. The song peaked in the top ten of various Monitor Latino charts in Latin America.

"Tu Héroe" was released digitally on music stores and streaming services on 10 November 2017, as the album's fourth single. The song peaked at number seven on the Paraguayan Monitor Latino charts.

"Adrenalina" was released digitally on music stores and streaming services on 1 December 2017, as the album's fifth single.

"Te Amo" was released digitally on music stores and streaming services on 15 March 2018, as the album's sixth single. The song peaked in the top ten of various Monitor Latino charts in Latin America.

"La Vida Sin Ti" was released alongside the album digitally on music store and to streaming services on 11 May 2018, as the album's seventh single The song peaked at number 44 on the US Hot Latin Songs chart.

"Puntos Suspensivos" was released on 14 September 2018, as the album's eighth single. The song peaked within top 40 of several Latin charts.

== Track listing ==
Songwriting credits taken from Tidal

No.	Title	Writer(s)	Producer(s)	Length
1.	"La Vida Sin Ti"	Juan David Castaño; David Escobar Gallego; Alejandro Rengifo; Pablo Mejía B.; Andres Torres; Mauricio Rengifo; Juan David Huertas	Juan Diego Arteaga; Mauricio Rengifo; Andrés Torres	3:14
2.	"Te Amo" (featuring Paulo Londra)	OvyOnTheDrums; Juan David Huertas; David Escobar G.; Juan D. Medina; Pablo Mejía B.; Paulo Londra	OvyOnTheDrums	3:21
3.	"Besándote"	Juan David Castaño; Juan David Huertas Clavijo; Pablo Mejia; Alejandro Patiño; Salomon Villada Hoyos; David Escobar Gallego	Sky	3:01
4.	"Adrenalina" (featuring Maikel Delacalle)	Maikel Delacalle; David Escobar Gallego; Pablo Mejía; Juan David Huertas; Alejandro Ramírez; Juan David Castaño	Sky	3:21
5.	"Frenesí" (featuring Zion & Lennox)	Juan Pablo Vega; Gabriel Pizarro; Felix Ortiz; Juan David Castaño; Juan David Huertas; Alejandro Patiño; Manuel Medrano; Rafael Regginalds Aponte; David Escobar G.; Pablo Mejía B.	Juan Pablo Vega; Mosty	3:33
6.	"Cada Noche"	Alejandro Patiño; Andres Restrepo; Juan David Castaño; Juan David Huertas; Pablo Mejia; David Escobar G.	Mosty	3:38
7.	"Tiempo"	Juan Pablo Vega; David Escobar Gallego; Juan David Castaño; Juan David Huertas; Pablo Mejía B.; Alejandro Patiño	Juan Pablo Vega	3:24
8.	"Déjala Que Vuelva" (featuring Manuel Turizo)	Juan Luis Londoño Arias; Édgar Barrera; Kevin Mauricio Jiménez Londoño; Bryan Snaider Lezcano	Juan Pablo Vega	3:40
9.	"Así No Se Hace"	Juan David Castaño; Juan David Huertas; Claudia Brant; Rafa Arcaute; David Escobar G.; Pablo Mejía B.; Alejandro Patiño	Rafa Arcaute	2:47
10.	"Puntos Suspensivos"	Juan David Huertas; Andy Clay; Juan David Castaño; Alejandro Patiño; David Escobar G.; Pablo Mejia; Ben Billions	Mosty; Ben Billions	3:06
11.	"Tu Héroe"	Juan David Castaño; Juan David Huertas; Landa Freak; David Escobar Castaño; Pablo Mejia	Mosty	3:15
12.	"Versos de Neruda" (featuring Xantos and Fonseca)	Pablo Mejía B.; David Escobar Gallego; Fonseca; Juan David Castaño; Juan David Huertas; Tainy; Xantos	Tainy	3:49
13.	"Me Llamas"	David Escobar G.; Pablo Mejía B.; Nick Rivera Caminero; Juan D. Medina; Juan David Castaño; Juan David Huertas; Gabriel A. Cruz; Cristhian Mena	Andrés Torres; Mauricio Rengifo	3:08
Total length:				43:17

== Charts ==
=== Weekly charts ===
Chart (2018)	Peak position
US Top Latin Albums (Billboard)	13
US Latin Pop Albums (Billboard)	5

=== Year-end charts ===
Chart (2018)	Position
US Top Latin Albums (Billboard)	42
Chart (2019)	Position
US Top Latin Albums (Billboard)	65

== Certifications ==
Region	Certification	Certified units/sales
Mexico (AMPROFON)	3× Platinum	180,000^{‡}
United States (RIAA)	Platinum (Latin)	60,000^{‡}
^{‡} Sales+streaming figures based on certification alone.

== Release history ==
List of regions, release dates, formats, labels and references
Region	Date	Formats	Label	Ref.
United States	11 May 2018	CD; Digital download; streaming	Warner Music Latina	
