= Valiente (album) =

Studio album by Thalía
- Released: November 9, 2018
- Genre: Reggaeton; trap; pop
- Label: Sony Music Latin
- Producer: Andrés Castro; Armando Ávila; Chuy Nuñez; DalePlay; Edgar Barrera; Jowan; Mario Cáceres; Mosty; Oscarcito; Patrick Ingunza; Sergio George; Servando Moriche Primera Mussett; Thalía; Tommy Mottola; Yasmil Marrufo

Thalía chronology
Latina (2016)	Valiente (2018)	Viva Kids Vol. 2 (2020)

Singles from Valiente
- 1. "No Me Acuerdo" Released: June 1, 2018; 2. "Me Oyen, Me Escuchan" Released: August 31, 2018; 3. "Lento" Released: September 27, 2018; 4. "Lindo Pero Bruto" Released: January 29, 2019; 5. "Qué Ironía" Released: May 15, 2019; 6. "Ahí" Released: June 28, 2019; 7. "Vikingo" Released: November 9, 2019; 8. "Por Amor Al Arte" Released: June 17, 2020

Valiente (English: Brave) is the sixteenth studio album by Mexican recording artist Thalía, released on November 9, 2018, by Sony Music Latin. The album brings the hit single No Me Acuerdo, that peaked number one across Latin America. "Lento" was released as the second single, which peaked top 10 in several countries. "Lindo Pero Bruto" is the third single, the song gained attention with its music video. The song "Me Oyen, Me Escuchan" was also released as a promotional single for the "Thalia's challenge" that became popular from a Facebook live video.

Valiente was certified Latin double Platinum in the US by the RIAA and Platinum in Mexico by AMPROFON.

== Singles ==
"No Me Acuerdo": It was released on June 1, 2018, as the lead single of the album. Thalía became the first Mexican artist to hit one billion views on YouTube with "No Me Acuerdo". The song performed well in charts all over the world and it was the most listened song of the summer of 2018 in Latin America.

"Me Oyen, Me Escuchan" the song became a hit before the album was released and then it was add as a bonus track. the song does not have an official video, a lot of people consider the Chuy Nuñez remix video to be the song's video and Thalía released an audio video on her official YouTube channel the same day of the song.

"Lento: third single of the album released on September 27, 2018. The video was filmed in the beaches in Miami. The song peaked at number 5 on the Billboard Latin Digital Songs charts becoming Thalía's highest peak on that chart.

"Lindo Pero Bruto": fourth single of the album the song caused controversy thanks to its feminist lyrics that defy the machismo culture that still thrives in many countries. The music video was directed by Daniel Duran, and its official premiere was on American television show ¡Despierta América! on the morning of January 29, 2019. The single was certified Gold by RIAA.

"Que Ironia": Thalía continues her tradition of collaborating with also rising stars, this time with the Mexican singer and previous winner of the reality competition La Academia Carlos Rivera. Thalia published the lyric video of "Qué Ironia" on Sunday, 12 May 2019. The song was considered as the third single from the album, after "No Me Acuerdo" and "Lento", but ended up being “shelved” in the promotional project. The recordings took place in Mexico, their birthplace, in November of last year.

"Ahí" the single was released in June 28 and is a collaboration with Ana Mena. The song has an urban rhythm and the video was released in the 8D format. In a few hours since its publication, Thalía's video already has more than 100,000 reproductions.

"Vikingo": the single was released on November 9, 2019, and its video was directed by one of the singer's fans, Marios, of Greek origin. In the video Thalía wears a radiant outfit that reveals her exquisite hips, in which Thalía has decided to look like a Greek goddess.

"Por Amor Al Arte" was the last single of the album. The lyrics of the song talk about a love between two women. A lyric video was made to promote the song.

== Commercial performance ==
The album debuted in 34 countries within all 5 continents and topped the iTunes charts in 13 of them on its first week. The album entered the top 20 in Argentina and Spain while in her native Mexico it reached number 2. In the U.S. the album debuted at number 7 on the Billboard Latin Album Chart with 2,000 pure copies sold in its first week and the rest from streaming equivalent sales while it debuted at the top position on the Latin Pop Album chart becoming her 7th album to top that chart and tying her with Shakira as the female artist with the most number ones on that list. The album also topped the Top Latin Album Sales chart in the U.S. on its debut week and stayed on the list for 14 weeks. The first four singles from the album reached the Mexican airplay charts. In 2021, the album was crowned as the Best Latin Album by a Female Artist in a fan poll by Billboard.

== Track listing ==
All credits adapted from Tidal.

No.	Title	Writer(s)	Producer(s)	Length
1.	"No Me Acuerdo" (with Natti Natasha)	Rafael Pina; Yasmil Marrufo; Mario Cáceres; Jon Leone; Frank Santofimio; Natalia Gutiérrez; Óscar Hernández; Juan G. Rivera Vázquez; Germán Hernández	Santofimio; Leone; Caceres; Oscarcito; Marrufo	3:37
2.	"Lindo Pero Bruto" (with Lali)	Édgar Barrera; Hernández; Jesús "DalePlay" Herrera; Andrés Castro; Patrick Ingunza	Thalía Sodi; Barrera; Castro; Armando Ávila; Oscarcito; Tommy Mottola; DalePlay; Patrick Romantik	2:57
3.	"Lento" (with Gente de Zona)	Castro; Julio Reyes Copello; Barrera; Leone; Alexander Delgado; Jorge Luis Chacín; Omar Alfanno; Randy Malcolm; Sergio George	George	3:36
4.	"Sube, Sube" (featuring Fonseca)	Servando Primera; Marrufo; Andrés Castro; Andy Clay	Primera; Marrufo	3:32
5.	"Tú Me Sientas Tan Bien" (featuring DABRUK)	José Luis de la Peña; Liza Quintana; María Josefa Fernández; Bruno Nicolás Fernández "DABRUK"; David Augustave	Dabruk	3:04
6.	"Vamos Órale"	Thalía Sodi; Primera; Mario Cáceres; George	Andy Clay	3:02
7.	"Ahí" (featuring Ana Mena)	Daniel Echavarría Oviedo	Ovy on the Drums	2:48
8.	"Corazón Valiente"	Daniel Giraldo; Sodi; Salomón Villada Hoyos; Andrés Restrepo; Johan Esteban Espinosa; Alejandro Patiño	Alejandro Patiño "Mosty"; Johan Esteban Espinosa "Jowan"	3:03
9.	"Qué Ironía" (with Carlos Rivera)	Primeira; Sodi; Marrufo; Cáceres	Mottola; Cáceres; Marrufo; Sodi; Ávila; Primera	4:11
10.	"Por Amor Al Arte"	Iván Guevara Lozano	Ávila	3:55
11.	"Ay Amor" (featuring El Micha)	Bigram Zayas; Sodi; Jorge Gómez; José C. García; Michael Fernando Sierra Miranda; Bilal Hajji; George; Yulien Oviedo	DVLP; Gómez; IAmChino; George	3:09
12.	"Vikingo"	Espinosa; Restrepo; Hoyos; Sodi; Giraldo; Patiño	Mosty; Jowan	3:11
13.	"Me Oyen, Me Escuchan"	Sodi	Chuy Nuñez	2:42

== Charts ==
=== Weekly charts ===
Chart (2018)	Peak position
Argentine Albums (CAPIF)	12
Mexican Albums (AMPROFON)	2
Mexican Spanish Albums (AMPROFON)	2
Spanish Albums (PROMUSICAE)	20
US Top Latin Albums (Billboard)	7
US Latin Pop Albums (Billboard)	1

=== Year-end charts ===
Chart (2018)	Position
Mexican Albums (AMPROFON)	85

Chart (2019)	Position
US Top Latin Albums (Billboard)	85

== Certifications and sales ==
Region	Certification	Certified units/sales
Mexico (AMPROFON)	Platinum	60,000^{‡}
United States (RIAA)	2× Platinum (Latin)	120,000^{‡}
^{‡} Sales+streaming figures based on certification alone.
