= Graciela Agudelo =

Mexican pianist and composer (1945–2018)

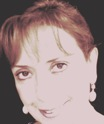
- Born: Graciela Agudelo Murguía; December 7, 1945
- Died: April 19, 2018 (aged 72)
- Occupations: pianist and composer
- Era: Contemporary

Graciela Agudelo (December 7, 1945 – April 19, 2018) was a Mexican pianist and composer.

== Life and career ==
Graciela Agudelo studied piano at the Universidad Nacional Autónoma de México and composition at the Conservatorio Nacional de Música with Héctor Quintanar and Mario Lavista. She received a scholarship from the Internationales Musikinstitu Darmstadt in Germany.

Agudelo is the founder of the chamber ensemble group Onix Ensamble and was a founding member of the Mexican Society of New Music. Agudelo has published a number of articles and essays and headed the official journal of the National School of Music of the Universidad Nacional Autónoma de México. She is the author of the Musical Initiation GAM Method for Children (ENM / UNAM, 1998) and Man and Music (Patria, 1998). In 2002 she received the Xochipilli award for outstanding creativity in the field of music in Mexico.

Though some of her music is didactic in nature (she wrote instructional books and music for students), she is best known for her "solo, chamber and orchestral works in an avant-garde style enlivened by an individualistic approach to national identity that avoids folkloristic clichés".

== Works and discography ==
Agudelo has composed for symphony orchestra, chamber ensemble, strings and theater, television and educational productions. Her works that have been issued on CD include:

- Navigators of twilight, for clarinet, bassoon and piano. CD: TRIO NEOS. Mexican Contemporary Music CNA/INBA/CENIDIM.
- Arabesque, for two recorders. CD: HORACIO FRANCO/Mexican Music for recorder. CNA/INBA/CENIDIM
- Invocation for Cello. CD: Solos - Duos. José Luis Gálvez, vc. Far from Heaven/SMMN/FONCA GLPD 21
- Toccata for harpsichord. CD: CONTEMPORARY MEXICAN Harpsichord. Lidia Guerberof clv. FONCA
- Meditations on Abya-Yala, for flute CD: Salvador Torre.
- Edges of the millennium. Far from Heaven/FONCA GLPD 34
- You came yesterday, for wind quintet. CD: Accademia Filarmonica di Bologna. Rasseggna Seconda Internazionale "Alpheus Gigli" Octandre Assembly. Gianpaolo Salbego, Director.
- Meditations on Abya-Yala, for flute. CD: World Music Days 2000. Carlo Jans/PROLIMA AV Studios. Luxembourg
- Seven Latino pieces for piano CD: THE TWENTIETH CENTURY IN MEXICO. María Teresa Frenk. ntología Piano. Quindecim/FONCA 38 QPO
- Meditations on Abya-Yala, for flute. CD: Jade night. Alejandro Escuer. Quindecim/FOUNDATION BANCOMER 71 QPO
- Arabesque, for two recorders. CD: HORACIO FRANCO (Reissue). INBA/ CENIDIM CONACULTA/Quindecim 55 QPO
- Lullaby, for voice and piano. CD: Songs of the moon. María Encarnación Vázquez.EURAMRECORDS/CONACULTA/FONCA
- Prisma, for clarinet, bassoon, percussion, piano, cello. CD: Songs from the edge/FONCA/EURAM RECORDS EURO 092-5
- Arquéfona, piano. CD: Songs from the edge
- You came yesterday, for wind quintet. CD: Songs from the edge
- A minstrel, for percussion. CD: Songs from the edge
- Toccata, for piano. CD: IEDM.
- Mirage, for clarinet, bassoon, violin, cello. CD. Id.
- Songs from the border, for flute, mezzo-soprano, percussion, piano, cello. CD:
- At midnight, arrangement for piano duet CD: An Encounter with the Music/ACADEMY DOREMI
- The Rorro. CD:
- Three Mexican folk songs, arranged for children's choir and chamber orchestra. CD:
- Adventures Suite, version for piano CD: Adventure / Ana Maria Tradatti, piano/Quindecim QP140
- Play the piano. CD:
- The children's carnival. CD:
- A while Iñaki born. CD:
- Three models of the twentieth century. CD:
- Merry Christmas, for piano four hands. Ana Maria Tradatti and Marta García-Renart. CD:
- Latinblue partita for piano. CD:
- Songs and music for kindergarten, for female voice, piano and percussion. CD: My box of honey/STANDARD EDITION SA Grupo Carvajal.
- Celebration of wine, for flute. CD: Songs For Backlight/CONACULTA /FONCA GA001
- Navigators of twilight, for clarinet, bassoon, piano. CD: *Aluxes tale, for percussion quartet. CD:
- Delirious in the estuary, for guitar. CD:
- Travel notes, for string quartet. CD:
- Nebularia, for flute, trombone, vibraphone, guitar, piano. CD:
- Mystic Quintet for string quartet with percussion and voice-CD:
