= Lindo Pero Bruto =

Single by Thalía and Lali

from the album Valiente
- Language: Spanish
- English title: "Cute But Dumb"
- Released: January 25, 2019
- Genre: Latin pop; reggaeton
- Length: 2:57
- Label: Sony Latin
- Songwriters: Andrés Castro; Edgar Barrera; Jesús Herrera; Oscar Hernández; Patrick Ingunza
- Producers: Andrés Castro; Edgar Barrera; DalePlay; Oscarcito; Patrick Romantik

Thalía singles chronology
"Lento" (2018)	"Lindo Pero Bruto" (2019)	"Qué Ironía" (2019)

Lali singles chronology
"Caliente" (2018)	"Lindo Pero Bruto" (2019)	"Somos Amantes" (2019)

Music video
- "Lindo Pero Bruto" on YouTube

"Lindo Pero Bruto" (English: "Cute But Dumb") is a song by Mexican singer Thalía and Argentine singer Lali, from Thalía's fourteenth studio album, Valiente (2018). Written and produced by Andrés Castro, Edgar Barrera, DalePlay, Oscarcito and Patrick Romantik, it was released by Sony Music Latin as the album's fourth single on January 25, 2019.

In 2020, the song was named by Billboard magazine as one of the best all-female collaborations in Latin music.

== Background ==
Rumors of a collaboration between the two singers started in March 2018, while Lali was promoting her single "100 Grados" in Mexico. There, she posted a video to her Instagram Stories in which she acknowledged Thalía, saying: "This story is particularly for Thalía, who followed me some time ago and got me so excited. So, while I am in Mexico, I want to send you a huge kiss and to tell you that you are the best." In October, 2018, previous to the release of Valiente, the song got leaked, which made Lali confirm the rumors, saying: "After what happened, I can confirm that I'm singing a song with Thalía!", adding that "[it] is the greatest honor in the world and I'm just telling you one thing: #LPB, Lindo Pero Bruto. A worldwide hit with queen Thalía is coming!" Thalía admitted that while gossiping on Instagram, she came across a photo of Lali in Mexico and sent her a direct message, saying: "Let's do a worldwide hit!"

"Lindo Pero Bruto" is a song dedicated to those men who talk the talk but don't walk the walk, don't offer much, or are only good for one thing. The song has been described as "reggaeton meets pop music, very dance-ready and surely something that Latin radios and Latin clubs will love equally to play." Jeff Benjamin of Forbes magazine described the song as "a playful-yet-powerful reggaeton throbber."

== Music video ==
Directed by Daniel Duran, the music video made its official premiere on American television show ¡Despierta América! on the morning of January 29, 2019. In the "candy-colored" music video for "Lindo Pero Bruto", both singers give life to a Barbie-inspired world filled with many neon colors, sweet treats, and dolls. Thalía and Lali play two female thinkers who are in a laboratory creating a futuristic machine to build a male prototype — in other words, the perfect man. However, they are the ones who become dolls. Described as "colorful, light-hearted and fun," the music video was inspired by the 1985 film Weird Science.

Thalía and Lali celebrated the success of the music video on YouTube through a Facebook live stream, which debuted at no. 2 on the January issue of the Billboard Top Facebook Live Videos Chart with 368 thousand views. It was also the most commented live stream of the month, with 14 thousand comments.

The music video received a nomination for Best Video at the 2020 Heat Latin Music Awards.

=== Background ===
The shooting took around 15 hours and it took place in New York City. According to the singers, it was freezing in the city and Lali had to film in shorts and a tee. In an interview with Forbes magazine, Thalía said: "I had [the idea] for a long time and I always wanted to do a video inspired by the '80s movie Weird Science and I always wanted to create my own doll and bring it to a plastic-fantastic, neon-pink-blue-world candyland. When I heard this song, I thought "boom!" the idea for so many years has landed! And I asked Lali, she said yes, and that completed the circle. As of January 2020, the video has been viewed around 75 million times on YouTube, and streamed more than 25 million times on Spotify.

== Live performances ==
Thalía and Lali performed the song together for the first time at the 31st edition of Premios Lo Nuestro, where Natti Natasha joined them to perform "No me acuerdo". Alejandra Torres of Hola! magazine chose the "explosive" performance as one of the most memorable moments of the night.

== Controversy ==
As the title suggests ("pretty, but dumb"), the song's feminist lyrics defy the machismo culture that still thrives in many countries, causing a bit of controversy in those places. Some people have interpreted the single as containing an anti-male message. However, Thalía admitted it's really a song about empowering anyone who listens to it – especially women. In an interview with ¡Despierta America!, when asked what would happen if a man told a woman she was "cute but dumb", the Mexican singer responded: "How many centuries, how many years have gone by for a song like this to exist. We've truly, as women, lived so many decades in which the roles have been the complete opposite, and it's now a time in which things are said as they are, there's no filter. I think women today, we're more united, more solid than ever in all aspects: political, artistic, religious, social. And I think it's time to have fun – to speak our minds."

== Personnel ==
Credits adapted from Tidal.

- Thalía Sodi – vocals, executive producer
- Lali Espósito – vocals
- Edgar Barrera – producer, songwriting
- Andrés Castro – producer, songwriting
- Oscarcito – producer, songwriting
- DalePlay – producer, songwriting
- Patrick Romantik – producer, songwriting
- Armando Ávila – executive producer, engineer, recording engineer
- Tommy Mottola – executive producer
- Karina Pagán – A&R coordinator
- Alex Gallardo – A&R director
- Isabel De Jesús – A&R Director
- Adriana Muñoz – assistant producer
- Pablo Arraya – engineer
- Emilio Ávila – executive director
- Felipe Tichauer – mastering engineer, recording engineer
- Luis Barrera – mixing engineer

== Charts ==
=== Weekly charts ===
Chart (2019)	Peak position
Argentina Hot 100 (Billboard)	21
Argentina Airplay (Monitor Latino)	11
Bolivia (Monitor Latino)	10
Ecuador (National-Report)	64
El Salvador Pop (Monitor Latino)	13
Honduras Pop (Monitor Latino)	5
Mexico (Billboard Espanol Airplay)	14
Mexico Pop (Monitor Latino)	15
Puerto Rico Pop (Monitor Latino)	16
US Latin Pop Airplay (Billboard)	32
Venezuela Pop (Monitor Latino)	18

=== Year-end charts ===
Chart (2019)	Position
Argentina (Monitor Latino)	36
Honduras Pop (Monitor Latino)	26
Puerto Rico Pop (Monitor Latino)	78
Venezuela Pop (Monitor Latino)	62

== Certifications and sales ==
Region	Certification	Certified units/sales
United States (RIAA)	Gold (Latin)	30,000^{‡}
^{‡} Sales+streaming figures based on certification alone.
