= Esperándote (Manuel Turizo song) =

2017 single by Manuel Turizo

Single by Manuel Turizo

from the album ADN
- Released: December 6, 2017
- Genre: Reggaeton
- Songwriters: Juan Diego Medina; Manuel Turizo Zapata; Julian Turizo; Santiago Mesa; Carlos Cossio; Cristhian Mena "Saga WhiteBlack"
- Producer: KZO

Manuel Turizo singles chronology
"Déjala Que Vuelva" (2017)	"Esperándote" (2018)	"Vaina Loca" (2018)

Esperándote (English title: Waiting for you) is a song by Colombian singer Manuel Turizo released in 2017.

== Background ==
"Esperándote" was written by Juan Diego Medina, Manuel Turizo, Julian Turizo, Santiago Mesa, Carlos Cossio, Christian Mesa and his producer KZO.

== Commercial performance ==
In Colombia, "Esperándote" peaked the number seven.

In Mexico, the song peaked the number 17.

In Spain, the song peaked the number 43.

In United States, the song peaked the number 39 at Hot Latin Songs, the number 21 at Latin Airplay and the number thirteen at Latin Pop Airplay.

"Esperándote" was certified 4× Platinum by Asociación Mexicana de Productores de Fonogramas y Videogramas (AMPROFON), gold by Productores de Música de España (PROMUSICAE) and double platinum by Recording Industry Association of America (RIAA).

== Charts ==
Chart (2017–18)	Peak position
Colombia (National-Report)	7
Mexico (Mexico Airplay)	17
Spain (PROMUSICAE)	43
US Hot Latin Songs (Billboard)	39
US Latin Airplay (Billboard)	21
US Latin Rhythm Airplay (Billboard)	13

== Certifications ==
Region	Certification	Certified units/sales
Mexico (AMPROFON)	4× Platinum	240,000^{‡}
Spain (Promusicae)	Gold	20,000^{‡}
United States (RIAA)	2× Platinum (Latin)	120,000^{‡}
^{‡} Sales+streaming figures based on certification alone.
