= Me Llamas =

Single by Piso 21

Single by Piso 21

from the album Ubuntu
- Released: 8 July 2016
- Genre: Latin pop; reggaeton
- Length: 3:08
- Label: Warner Music Mexico
- Songwriters: Juan David Castaño; Gabriel Cruz; Yoel Damas; David Escobar; Juan David Huertas; Nick Rivera Caminero; Juan Diego Medina; Pablo Mejia; Cristhian Mena
- Producers: Andrés Torres, Mauricio Rengifo, Max Borghetti

Piso 21 singles chronology
"Hoy" (2015)	"Me Llamas" (2016)	"Ando Buscando" (2016)

Music video
- "Me Llamas" on YouTube

"Me Llamas (Remix)"

Single by Piso 21 featuring Maluma
- Released: 2 December 2016
- Genre: Latin pop; reggaeton
- Length: 3:30
- Label: Warner Music Mexico
- Songwriters: Juan David Castaño; Gabriel Cruz; Yoel Damas; David Escobar; Juan David Huertas; Nick Rivera Caminero; Juan Diego Medina; Pablo Mejia; Cristhian Mena
- Producers: Andrés Torres, Mauricio Rengifo, Max Borghetti

Maluma singles chronology
"Chantaje" (2016)	"Me Llamas (Remix)" (2016)	"Felices los 4" (2017)

Music video
- "Me Llamas (Maluma Remix)" on YouTube

"Me Llamas" (transl. "You Call Me") is a song by Colombian band Piso 21, from their second studio album Ubuntu (2018). It was released on 8 July 2016, by the Mexican division of Warner Music Group as the album's lead single. On 2 December 2016, a remix featuring Colombian singer Maluma was released. The remix helped improve the song's overall chart performance and lead to the single having more success in Spain and various Latin American countries. The official music video for the remix was released on 1 December 2016 on Piso 21's YouTube account and has received over 520 million views.

The song is part of the soundtrack of the first season of the Colombian telenovela La ley del corazón.

== Lyric video ==
The lyric video for "Me Llamas" premiered on 7 July 2016 on Piso 21's YouTube account and has been viewed over 90 million times.

== Music video ==
The music video for "Me Llamas" premiered on 2 September 2016 on Piso 21's YouTube account. The music video was directed by David Bohórquez and has been viewed over 92 million times.

== Track listing ==
Digital download
No.	Title	Length
1.	"Me Llamas"	3:08

Digital download – Maluma Remix
No.	Title	Length
1.	"Me Llamas" (Maluma remix)	3:30

== Charts ==
=== Weekly charts ===
Chart (2016–17)	Peak position
Argentina (Monitor Latino)	12
Chile (Monitor Latino)	15
Colombia (National-Report)	9
Ecuador (National-Report)	30
Mexico (Billboard Mexican Airplay)	37
Paraguay (Monitor Latino)	12
Spain (Promusicae)	18
US Hot Latin Songs (Billboard)	32
US Latin Airplay (Billboard)	39
US Tropical Airplay (Billboard)	1
US Latin Rhythm Airplay (Billboard)	7

=== Year-end charts ===
Chart (2017)	Position
Spain (PROMUSICAE)	18
US Hot Latin Songs (Billboard)	89

== Certifications ==
Region	Certification	Certified units/sales
Argentina (CAPIF)	2× Platinum	40,000^{*}
Italy (FIMI)	Gold	25,000^{‡}
Mexico (AMPROFON)	Diamond+4× Platinum	540,000^{‡}
Spain (Promusicae)	4× Platinum	160,000^{‡}
Spain (Promusicae) Remix	3× Platinum	120,000^{‡}
United States (RIAA)	Platinum (Latin)	60,000^{‡}
United States (RIAA) Remix	6× Platinum (Latin)	360,000^{‡}
Streaming
Chile (Profovi)	Platinum	8,000,000
^{*} Sales figures based on certification alone.^{‡} Sales+streaming figures based on certification alone.
