= List of top 100 songs for 2018 in Mexico =

These are the lists of the top 100 songs of 2018 in Mexico according to Monitor Latino. Monitor Latino issued two year-end General charts: one which ranked the songs by their number of Spins (Tocadas) on the Mexican radio, and the other ranked the songs by their estimated audience. Monitor Latino also issued separate year-end charts for Regional Mexican, Pop and Anglo songs.

== Spins ==
№	Title	Artist(s)
1	"Tu postura"	Banda MS
2	"Antecedentes de culpa"	Alfredo Olivas
3	"Me niego"	Reik featuring Ozuna & Wisin
4	"En peligro de Extinción"	La Adictiva Banda San José de Mesillas
5	"Calidad y cantidad"	La Arrolladora Banda El Limón
6	"Segunda opción"	Banda Carnaval
7	"Mi sorpresa fuiste tú"	Calibre 50
8	"Mitad y mitad"	Calibre 50
9	"Échame la culpa"	Luis Fonsi featuring Demi Lovato
10	"X"	Nicky Jam & J Balvin
11	"One Kiss"	Calvin Harris & Dua Lipa
12	"Oye Mujer"	Raymix featuring Juanes
13	"Me dejé llevar"	Christian Nodal
14	"Al cien y pasadito"	Jorge Medina
15	Cuando nadie ve"	Morat
16	"Te fallé"	Christian Nodal
17	"Para sacarte de mi vida"	Alejandro Fernández featuring Los Tigres del Norte
18	"No hay nadie más (My Only One)"	Sebastián Yatra & Isabela Moner
19	"Tu eres la razón"	La Arrolladora Banda El Limón
20	"Buscabamos lo mismo"	Los Plebes Del Rancho De Ariel Camacho
21	"Te invito"	Remmy Valenzuela
22	"La sonrisa obligatoria"	Julión Álvarez Y Su Norteño Banda
23	"Íntimamente"	Banda El Recodo
24	"Bella"	Wolfine featuring Maluma
25	"Según tus labios"	Los Plebes Del Rancho De Ariel Camacho
26	"Anywhere"	Rita Ora
27	"En eso no quedamos"	Banda Los Sebastianes
28	"Esta es tu canción"	La Adictiva Banda San José de Mesillas
29	"Tres recuerdos"	Banda Los Recoditos
30	"To my love"	Bomba Estereo
31	"No es justo"	J Balvin featuring Zion Y Lennox
32	"The Middle"	Zedd, Grey & Maren Morris
33	"Donde estarás"	Raymix
34	"Sentimientos"	Alicia Villarreal featuring María José
35	"No me acuerdo"	Thalía & Natti Natasha
36	"Entre beso y beso"	La Arrolladora Banda El Limón
37	"Contigo"	Los Elementos De Culiacán
38	"Clandestino"	Shakira & Maluma
39	"A partir de hoy"	David Bisbal featuring Sebastián Yatra
40	"Necesitaría"	Lucero
41	"El pisto es primero"	Chuy Lizárraga
42	"Tenemos que hablar"	Banda Tierra Sagrada
43	"Calypso"	Luis Fonsi & Stefflon Don
44	"Dura"	Daddy Yankee
45	"Mi meta contigo"	Banda Los Sebastianes
46	"Havana"	Camila Cabello featuring Young Thug
47	"No Tears Left to Cry"	Ariana Grande
48	"La mejor de las historias"	Alfredo Olivas
49	"Breathe"	Jax Jones featuring Ina Wroldsen
50	"Fijate que sí"	Edwin Luna y la Trakalosa de Monterrey
51	"Hola mi amor"	El Chapo de Sinaloa
52	"Déjala Que Vuelva"	Piso 21 featuring Manuel Turizo
53	"No te contaron mal"	Christian Nodal
54	"El Préstamo"	Maluma
55	"Yo te lo estoy afirmando"	Julión Álvarez Y Su Norteño Banda
56	"Ya tiene novio mi ex"	Cristian Jacobo
57	"Corazón"	Maluma
58	"Mejor me alejo"	Banda MS
59	"Para morir feliz"	Los Inquietos del Norte
60	"Por perro"	Sebastián Yatra featuring Lary Over & Luis Figueroa
61	"1, 2, 3"	Sofía Reyes featuring De La Ghetto & Jason Derulo
62	"Seremos"	El Bebeto
63	"El corrido de Nano"	El Fantasma
64	"Me hubieras dicho"	Joss Favela
65	"Vengo a aclarar"	El Fantasma
66	"Zapateado endemoniado"	Marco Flores y la Jerez
67	"Si Dios me lleva con él"	Los Alegres de la Sierra
68	"De nuevo la perdí"	Beto Peña
69	"Girls Like You"	Maroon 5 featuring Cardi B
70	"Esperándote"	Manuel Turizo
71	"Te darán ganas de verme"	Banda Los Recoditos
72	"El aroma de tu piel"	Gerardo Ortiz
73	"Does It Matter"	Janieck Devy
74	"Besos en guerra"	Morat featuring Juanes
75	"Princesa"	TINI & Karol G
76	"Nunca es suficiente"	Los Ángeles Azules featuring Natalia Lafourcade
77	"Feel It Still"	Portugal. The Man
78	"Fiebre"	Ricky Martin featuring Wisin & Yandel
79	"El Baño"	Enrique Iglesias featuring Bad Bunny
80	"A las cuantas decepciones"	Los de la Noria featuring Calibre 50
81	"No pasa nada"	Ha*Ash
82	"El color de tus ojos"	Banda MS
83	"Un adiós es de dos"	Lamafia featuring Ricky Muñoz
84	"Merezco mucho más"	Victoria la mala
85	"Azul"	Zoé
86	"Dime que sí"	Edwin Luna y la Trakalosa de Monterrey
87	"Hielo"	Zoé
88	"Voy a quererte tanto"	Los de la noria
89	"Amigos con derechos"	Reik & Maluma
90	"Me muero"	Carlos Rivera
91	"Pa dentro"	Juanes
92	"Fiesta"	Kalimba
93	"Tiempo"	Banda Los Recoditos
94	"Amando demasiado"	Simón Leon
95	"Sorry"	Impacto Sinaloense
96	"Never Be The Same"	Camila Cabello
97	"Ya me vi"	Impacto Sinaloense
98	"Que tonteria"	La Séptima Banda
99	"Se vuelve loca"	CNCO
100	"Déjate llevar"	Juan Magan featuring B Case, Belinda, Manuel Turizo & Snova

== See also ==
- List of number-one songs of 2018 (Mexico)
- List of number-one albums of 2018 (Mexico)
