= List of number-one songs of 2018 (Bolivia) =

This is a list of the number-one songs of 2018 in Bolivia. The airplay charts are published by Monitor Latino, based on airplay across radio stations in Bolivia using the Radio Tracking Data, LLC in real time. Charts are compiled from Monday to Sunday.

== Chart history ==
Issue Date	Song	Artist (s)	Ref.
January 7	"Échame la culpa"	Luis Fonsi featuring Demi Lovato	
January 14	"Échame la culpa"	Luis Fonsi featuring Demi Lovato	
January 21	"Échame la culpa"	Luis Fonsi featuring Demi Lovato	
January 28	"Corazón"	Maluma featuring Nego do Borel	
February 4	"Échame la culpa"	Luis Fonsi featuring Demi Lovato	
February 11	"Megamix"	Los Ronisch	
February 18	"Corazón"	Maluma featuring Nego do Borel	
February 26	"Corazón"	Maluma featuring Nego do Borel	
March 4	"Dura"	Daddy Yankee	
March 11	"Dura"	Daddy Yankee	
March 18	"Déjala que vuelva"	Piso 21 featuring Manuel Turizo	
March 25	"Bella"	Wolfine	
April 1	"Dura"	Daddy Yankee	
April 8	"Me niego"	Reik featuring Ozuna & Wisin	
April 15	"Me niego"	Reik featuring Ozuna & Wisin	
April 22	"Dura"	Daddy Yankee	
April 29	"1, 2, 3"	Sofía Reyes featuring Jason Derulo & De La Ghetto	
May 6	"X"	Nicky Jam & J Balvin	
May 13	"Cumbia lenta"	Fabio Zambrana featuring Iciar Díaz	
May 20	"Cumbia lenta"	Fabio Zambrana featuring Iciar Díaz	
May 27	"Cumbia lenta"	Fabio Zambrana featuring Iciar Díaz	
June 3	"Cumbia lenta"	Fabio Zambrana featuring Iciar Díaz	
June 10	"Por perro"	Sebastián Yatra featuring Lary Over & Luis Figueroa	
June 17	"La Player"	Zion & Lennox	
June 24	"Sin pijama"	Becky G featuring Natti Natasha	
July 1	"Sin pijama"	Becky G featuring Natti Natasha	
July 8	"Piensa"	Kudai	
July 15	"Cumbia lenta"	Fabio Zambrana featuring Iciar Díaz	
July 22	"No me acuerdo"	Thalía featuring Natti Natasha	
July 29	"No me acuerdo"	Thalía featuring Natti Natasha	
August 5	"No me acuerdo"	Thalía featuring Natti Natasha	
August 12	"No me acuerdo"	Thalía featuring Natti Natasha	
August 19	"No me acuerdo"	Thalía featuring Natti Natasha	
August 26	"No me acuerdo"	Thalía featuring Natti Natasha	
September 2	"Ella me persigue"	Alkilados featuring Bonny Lovy	
September 9	"7 mares"	Alan Rocco	
September 16	"Clandestino"	Shakira & Maluma	
September 23	"Ella me persigue"	Alkilados featuring Bonny Lovy	
September 30	"Ella me persigue"	Alkilados featuring Bonny Lovy	
October 7	"Ella me persigue"	Alkilados featuring Bonny Lovy	
October 14	"Ella me persigue"	Alkilados featuring Bonny Lovy	
October 21	"Ella me persigue"	Alkilados featuring Bonny Lovy	
October 28	"Ella me persigue"	Alkilados featuring Bonny Lovy	
November 4	"No es justo"	J Balvin featuring Zion & Lennox	
November 11	"Taki Taki"	DJ Snake featuring Cardi B, Ozuna & Selena Gomez	
