= List of number-one songs of 2018 (Guatemala) =

This is a list of the number-one songs of 2018 in Guatemala. The airplay chart rankings are published by Monitor Latino, based on airplay across radio stations in Guatemala using the Radio Tracking Data, LLC in real time. Charts are compiled from Monday to Sunday.

== Chart history ==
Besides the General chart, Monitor Latino publishes "Pop", "Regional Mexican" and "Anglo" charts for Guatemala. Monitor Latino provides two lists for each of these charts: the "Audience" list ranks the songs according to the number of people that listened to them on the radio during the week. The "Tocadas" (Spins) list ranks the songs according to the number of times they were played on the radio during the week. Beginning in the June 17 week, Monitor Latino ceased to publish the separate Audience and Spins charts, instead publishing a combined chart.

=== General ===
Issue Date	Audience		Spins		Ref.
Issue Date	Song	Artist(s)	Song	Artist(s)	Ref.
January 7	"Échame la culpa"	Luis Fonsi ft. Demi Lovato	"Échame la culpa"	Luis Fonsi ft. Demi Lovato	
January 14	"Échame la culpa"	Luis Fonsi ft. Demi Lovato	"Échame la culpa"	Luis Fonsi ft. Demi Lovato	
January 21	"Échame la culpa"	Luis Fonsi ft. Demi Lovato	"Échame la culpa"	Luis Fonsi ft. Demi Lovato	
January 28	"Échame la culpa"	Luis Fonsi ft. Demi Lovato	"Échame la culpa"	Luis Fonsi ft. Demi Lovato	
February 4	"Échame la culpa"	Luis Fonsi ft. Demi Lovato	"Échame la culpa"	Luis Fonsi ft. Demi Lovato	
February 11	"Échame la culpa"	Luis Fonsi ft. Demi Lovato	"Échame la culpa"	Luis Fonsi ft. Demi Lovato	
February 18	"Échame la culpa"	Luis Fonsi ft. Demi Lovato	"Échame la culpa"	Luis Fonsi ft. Demi Lovato	
February 25	"Échame la culpa"	Luis Fonsi ft. Demi Lovato	"Bella"	Wolfine	
March 4	"Échame la culpa"	Luis Fonsi ft. Demi Lovato	"Dura"	Daddy Yankee	
March 11	"Dura"	Daddy Yankee	"Bella"	Wolfine	
March 18	"Dura"	Daddy Yankee	"Dura"	Daddy Yankee	
March 25	"Dura"	Daddy Yankee	"Dura"	Daddy Yankee	
April 1	"Dura"	Daddy Yankee	"Dura"	Daddy Yankee	
April 8	"Dura"	Daddy Yankee	"Dura"	Daddy Yankee	
April 15	"Bella"	Wolfine	"Bella"	Wolfine	
April 22	"Dura"	Daddy Yankee	"Dura"	Daddy Yankee	
April 29	"Bella"	Wolfine	"Dura"	Daddy Yankee	
May 6	"Me niego"	Reik ft. Ozuna & Wisin	"Dura"	Daddy Yankee	
May 13	"Me niego"	Reik ft. Ozuna & Wisin	"Dura"	Daddy Yankee	
May 20	"Me niego"	Reik ft. Ozuna & Wisin	"Dura"	Daddy Yankee	
May 27	"Bella"	Wolfine ft. Maluma	"Bella"	Wolfine ft. Maluma	
June 3	"Bella"	Wolfine ft. Maluma	"Bella"	Wolfine ft. Maluma	
June 10	"Me niego"	Reik ft. Ozuna & Wisin	"Bella"	Wolfine ft. Maluma	

Issue date	Song	Artist(s)	Ref.
June 17	"Bella"	Wolfine ft. Maluma	
June 24	"Bella"	Wolfine ft. Maluma	
July 1	"Mi cama"	Karol G	
July 8	"Calypso"	Luis Fonsi ft. Stefflon Don	
July 15	"Calypso"	Luis Fonsi ft. Stefflon Don	
July 22	"Calypso"	Luis Fonsi ft. Stefflon Don	
July 29	"Calypso"	Luis Fonsi ft. Stefflon Don	
August 5	"En peligro de extinción"	La Adictiva Banda San José de Mesillas	
August 12	"Calypso"	Luis Fonsi ft. Stefflon Don	
August 19	"Ya tiene novio mi ex"	Cristian Jacobo	
August 26	"Calypso"	Luis Fonsi ft. Stefflon Don	
September 2	"Tú sin mí"	Grupo Montez de Durango	
September 9	"Tú sin mí"	Grupo Montez de Durango	
September 16	"Yo no me enamoro"	Alex Ruiz	
September 23	"Yo no me enamoro"	Alex Ruiz	
September 30	"Calypso"	Luis Fonsi ft. Stefflon Don	
October 7	"Calypso"	Luis Fonsi ft. Stefflon Don	
October 14	"Yo te lo estoy afirmando"	Julión Álvarez y su Norteño Banda	
October 21	"Taki Taki"	DJ Snake ft. Cardi B, Ozuna and Selena Gomez	
October 28	"Taki Taki"	DJ Snake ft. Cardi B, Ozuna and Selena Gomez	

=== Pop ===
This chart ranks Spanish-language songs from all genres, except for Regional Mexican music.

Issue Date	Audience		Spins		Ref.
Issue Date	Song	Artist(s)	Song	Artist(s)	Ref.
January 7	"Échame la culpa"	Luis Fonsi ft. Demi Lovato	"Échame la culpa"	Luis Fonsi ft. Demi Lovato	
January 14	"Échame la culpa"	Luis Fonsi ft. Demi Lovato	"Échame la culpa"	Luis Fonsi ft. Demi Lovato	
January 21	"Échame la culpa"	Luis Fonsi ft. Demi Lovato	"Échame la culpa"	Luis Fonsi ft. Demi Lovato	
January 28	"Échame la culpa"	Luis Fonsi ft. Demi Lovato	"Échame la culpa"	Luis Fonsi ft. Demi Lovato	
February 4	"Échame la culpa"	Luis Fonsi ft. Demi Lovato	"Échame la culpa"	Luis Fonsi ft. Demi Lovato	
February 11	"Échame la culpa"	Luis Fonsi ft. Demi Lovato	"Échame la culpa"	Luis Fonsi ft. Demi Lovato	
February 18	"Échame la culpa"	Luis Fonsi ft. Demi Lovato	"Échame la culpa"	Luis Fonsi ft. Demi Lovato	
February 25	"Échame la culpa"	Luis Fonsi ft. Demi Lovato	"Bella"	Wolfine	
March 4	"Échame la culpa"	Luis Fonsi ft. Demi Lovato	"Dura"	Daddy Yankee	
March 11	"Dura"	Daddy Yankee	"Bella"	Wolfine	
March 18	"Dura"	Daddy Yankee	"Dura"	Daddy Yankee	
March 25	"Dura"	Daddy Yankee	"Dura"	Daddy Yankee	
April 1	"Dura"	Daddy Yankee	"Dura"	Daddy Yankee	
April 8	"Dura"	Daddy Yankee	"Dura"	Daddy Yankee	
April 15	"Bella"	Wolfine	"Bella"	Wolfine	
April 22	"Dura"	Daddy Yankee	"Dura"	Daddy Yankee	
April 29	"Bella"	Wolfine	"Dura"	Daddy Yankee	
May 6	"Me niego"	Reik ft. Ozuna & Wisin	"Dura"	Daddy Yankee	
May 13	"Me niego"	Reik ft. Ozuna & Wisin	"Dura"	Daddy Yankee	
May 20	"Me niego"	Reik ft. Ozuna & Wisin	"Dura"	Daddy Yankee	
May 27	"Bella"	Wolfine ft. Maluma	"Bella"	Wolfine ft. Maluma	
June 3	"Bella"	Wolfine ft. Maluma	"Bella"	Wolfine ft. Maluma	
June 10	"Me niego"	Reik ft. Ozuna & Wisin	"Bella"	Wolfine ft. Maluma	

Issue date	Song	Artist(s)	Ref.
June 17	"Bella"	Wolfine ft. Maluma	
June 24	"Bella"	Wolfine ft. Maluma	

=== Regional Mexican ===
Issue Date	Audience		Spins		Ref.
Issue Date	Song	Artist(s)	Song	Artist(s)	Ref.
January 7	"No me friegues la vida"	Espinoza Paz	"Masoquista"	Pipe Bueno	
January 14	"Masoquista"	Pipe Bueno	"Masoquista"	Pipe Bueno	
January 21	"El paciente"	Alfredo Olivas	"El paciente"	Alfredo Olivas	
January 28	"El paciente"	Alfredo Olivas	"No me friegues la vida"	Espinoza Paz	
February 4	"El color de tus ojos"	Banda MS	"No me friegues la vida"	Espinoza Paz	
February 11	"No me friegues la vida"	Espinoza Paz	"No me friegues la vida"	Espinoza Paz	
February 18	"El color de tus ojos"	Banda MS	"No me friegues la vida"	Espinoza Paz	
February 25	"El color de tus ojos"	Banda MS	"No me friegues la vida"	Espinoza Paz	
March 4	"50 mentadas"	Claudio Alcaraz y su Banda La Mundial	"50 mentadas"	Claudio Alcaraz y su Banda La Mundial	
March 11	"50 mentadas"	Claudio Alcaraz y su Banda La Mundial	"50 mentadas"	Claudio Alcaraz y su Banda La Mundial	
March 18	"Me dejé llevar"	Christian Nodal	"Me dejé llevar"	Christian Nodal	
March 25	"Me dejé llevar"	Christian Nodal	"Me dejé llevar"	Christian Nodal	
April 1	"Antecedentes de culpa"	Alfredo Olivas	"Antecedentes de culpa"	Alfredo Olivas	
April 8	"Antecedentes de culpa"	Alfredo Olivas	"Antecedentes de culpa"	Alfredo Olivas	
April 15	"Antecedentes de culpa"	Alfredo Olivas	"Durmiendo en el lugar equivocado"	La Adictiva	
April 22	"Durmiendo en el lugar equivocado"	La Adictiva	"Durmiendo en el lugar equivocado"	La Adictiva	
April 29	"Durmiendo en el lugar equivocado"	La Adictiva	"Durmiendo en el lugar equivocado"	La Adictiva	
May 6	"Antecedentes de culpa"	Alfredo Olivas	"Durmiendo en el lugar equivocado"	La Adictiva	
May 13	"Te amo mamá"	Los Bukis	"Durmiendo en el lugar equivocado"	La Adictiva	
May 20	"Durmiendo en el lugar equivocado"	La Adictiva	"Durmiendo en el lugar equivocado"	La Adictiva	
May 27	"Antecedentes de culpa"	Alfredo Olivas	"Antecedentes de culpa"	Alfredo Olivas	
June 3	"Antecedentes de culpa"	Alfredo Olivas	"Antecedentes de culpa"	Alfredo Olivas	
June 10	"¿En dónde está tu amor?"	Virlan García	"¿En dónde está tu amor?"	Virlan García	

Issue date	Song	Artist(s)	Ref.
June 17	"¿En dónde está tu amor?"	Virlan García	
June 24	"¿En dónde está tu amor?"	Virlan García	

=== Anglo ===
This chart ranks English-language songs from all genres.

Issue Date	Audience		Spins		Ref.
Issue Date	Song	Artist(s)	Song	Artist(s)	Ref.
January 7	"Havana"	Camila Cabello ft. Young Thug	"Havana"	Camila Cabello ft. Young Thug	
January 14	"Havana"	Camila Cabello ft. Young Thug	"Havana"	Camila Cabello ft. Young Thug	
January 21	"Havana"	Camila Cabello ft. Young Thug	"Havana"	Camila Cabello ft. Young Thug	
January 28	"Havana"	Camila Cabello ft. Young Thug	"Havana"	Camila Cabello ft. Young Thug	
February 4	"Havana"	Camila Cabello ft. Young Thug	"Havana"	Camila Cabello ft. Young Thug	
February 11	"Havana"	Camila Cabello ft. Young Thug	"Havana"	Camila Cabello ft. Young Thug	
February 18	"Havana"	Camila Cabello ft. Young Thug	"Havana"	Camila Cabello ft. Young Thug	
February 25	"Havana"	Camila Cabello ft. Young Thug	"Havana"	Camila Cabello ft. Young Thug	
March 4	"Havana"	Camila Cabello ft. Young Thug	"Havana"	Camila Cabello ft. Young Thug	
March 11	"Havana"	Camila Cabello ft. Young Thug	"Havana"	Camila Cabello ft. Young Thug	
March 18	"Havana"	Camila Cabello ft. Young Thug	"Havana"	Camila Cabello ft. Young Thug	
March 25	"Havana"	Camila Cabello ft. Young Thug	"Havana"	Camila Cabello ft. Young Thug	
April 1	"Mad Love"	Sean Paul ft. Becky G & David Guetta	"Mad Love"	Sean Paul ft. Becky G & David Guetta	
April 8	"Mad Love"	Sean Paul ft. Becky G & David Guetta	"Mad Love"	Sean Paul ft. Becky G & David Guetta	
April 15	"Mad Love"	Sean Paul ft. Becky G & David Guetta	"Mad Love"	Sean Paul ft. Becky G & David Guetta	
April 22	"Mad Love"	Sean Paul ft. Becky G & David Guetta	"Tu Pum Pum"	Karol G ft. El Capitaan, Sekuence & Shaggy	
April 29	"Perfect"	Ed Sheeran	"Perfect"	Ed Sheeran	
May 6	"Havana"	Camila Cabello ft. Young Thug	"Mad Love"	Sean Paul ft. Becky G & David Guetta	
May 13	"No Tears Left to Cry"	Ariana Grande	"No Tears Left to Cry"	Ariana Grande	
May 20	"Havana"	Camila Cabello ft. Young Thug	"Familiar"	Liam Payne & J Balvin	
May 27	"Move to Miami"	Enrique Iglesias ft. Pitbull	"Familiar"	Liam Payne & J Balvin	
June 3	"Move to Miami"	Enrique Iglesias ft. Pitbull	"Familiar"	Liam Payne & J Balvin	
June 10	"Havana"	Camila Cabello ft. Young Thug	"Familiar"	Liam Payne & J Balvin	
