= List of number-one songs of 2018 (Mexico) =

This is a list of the number-one songs of 2018 in Mexico. The airplay chart rankings are published by Monitor Latino, based on airplay across radio stations in Mexico using the Radio Tracking Data, LLC in real time. Charts are compiled from Monday to Sunday.

The streaming charts are published by AMPROFON (Asociación Mexicana de Productores de Fonogramas y Videogramas).

== Chart history (Airplay) ==
Besides the General chart, Monitor Latino publishes "Pop", "Popular" (Regional Mexican music) and "Anglo" charts. Monitor Latino provided two lists for each of these charts: the "Audience" list ranked the songs according to the estimated number of people that listened to them on the radio during the week. The "Tocadas" (Spins) list ranked the songs according to the number of times they were played on the radio during the week.

=== General ===
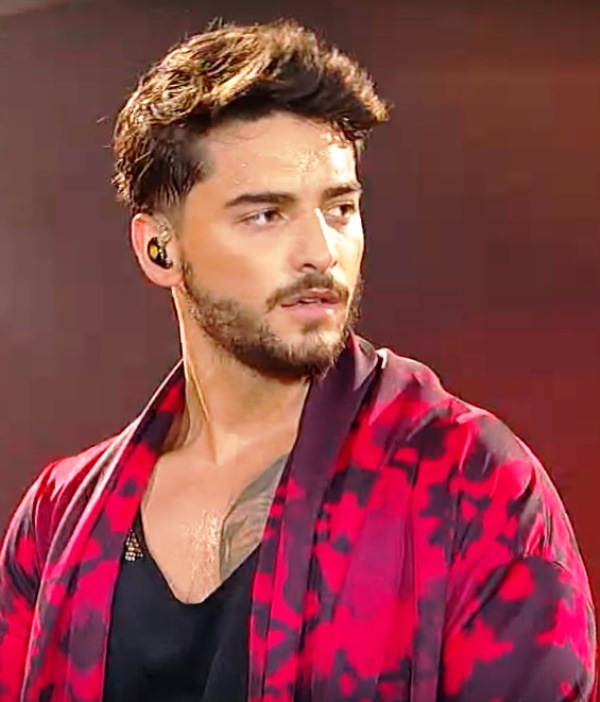
Colombian singer Maluma (pictured) earned four General number-one songs in 2018.

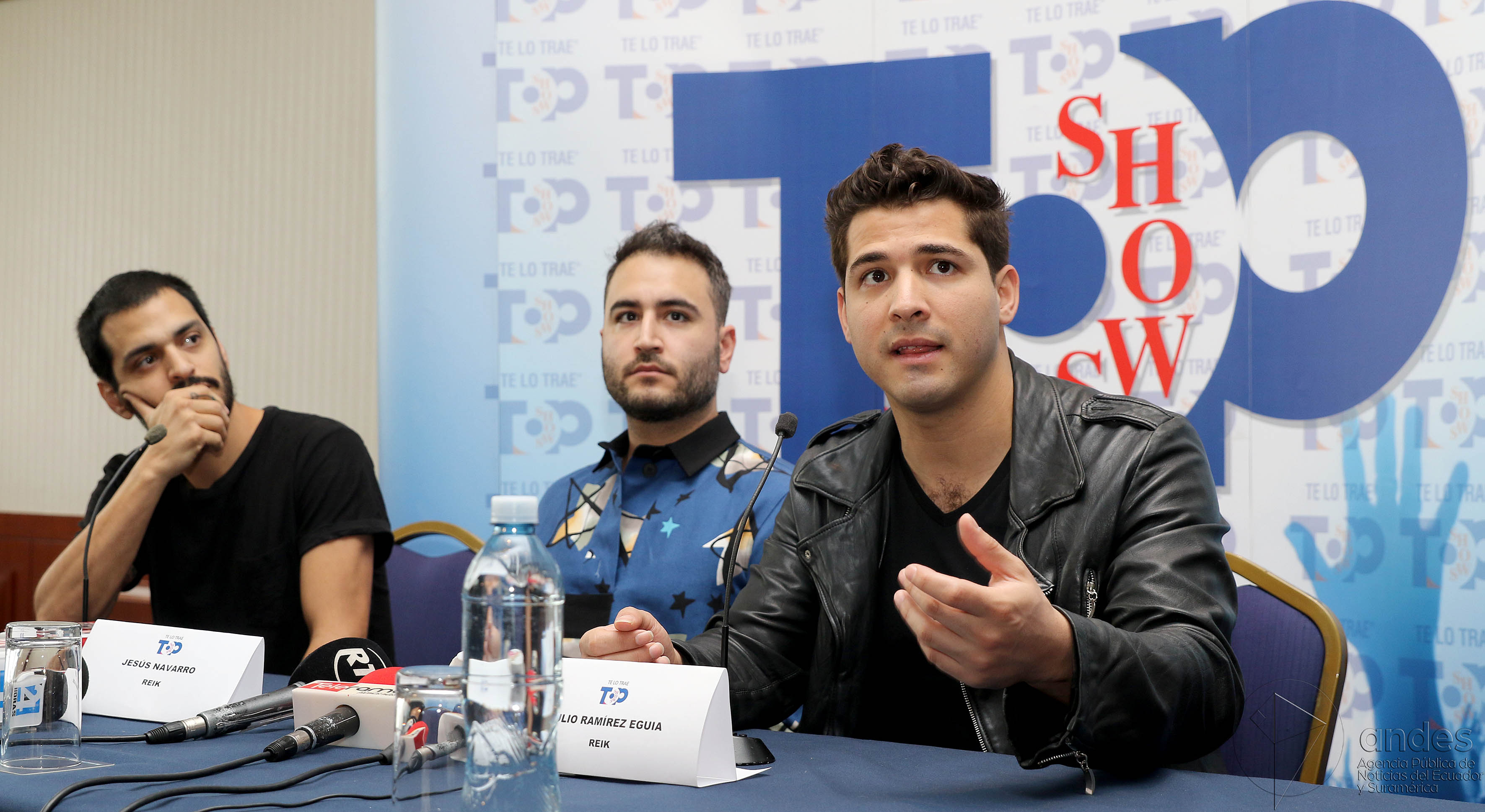
Mexican band Reik (pictured) earned their second General #1 song with "Me niego", and their first General number-one since 2008.

"Tu postura" by Banda MS was the best performing song of the year, both by estimated audience and number of spins.

| Issue date | Song (Audience) | Song (Spins) | Ref. |
|---|---|---|---|
| January 7 | "Corazón"^{Maluma featuring Nego do Borel} | "Seremos"^{El Bebeto} | |
| January 14 | "Corazón"^{Maluma featuring Nego do Borel} | "Entre beso y beso"^{La Arrolladora Banda El Limón} | |
| January 21 | "Échame la culpa"^{Luis Fonsi featuring Demi Lovato} | "Esta es tu canción"^{La Adictiva Banda San José de Mesillas} | |
| January 28 | "Échame la culpa"^{Luis Fonsi featuring Demi Lovato} | "Esta es tu canción"^{La Adictiva Banda San José de Mesillas} | |
| February 4 | "Échame la culpa"^{Luis Fonsi featuring Demi Lovato} | "Échame la culpa"^{Luis Fonsi featuring Demi Lovato} | |
| February 11 | "Échame la culpa"^{Luis Fonsi featuring Demi Lovato} | "Échame la culpa"^{Luis Fonsi featuring Demi Lovato} | |
| February 18 | "El baño"^{Enrique Iglesias featuring Bad Bunny} | "Échame la culpa"^{Luis Fonsi featuring Demi Lovato} | |
| February 25 | "El baño"^{Enrique Iglesias featuring Bad Bunny} | "Échame la culpa"^{Luis Fonsi featuring Demi Lovato} | |
| March 4 | "El baño"^{Enrique Iglesias featuring Bad Bunny} | "Antecedentes de culpa"^{Alfredo Olivas} | |
| March 11 | "Antecedentes de culpa"^{Alfredo Olivas} | "Me dejé llevar"^{Christian Nodal} | |
| March 18 | "Me niego"^{Reik featuring Ozuna & Wisin} | "Me dejé llevar"^{Christian Nodal} | |
| March 25 | "Me niego"^{Reik featuring Ozuna & Wisin} | "Me dejé llevar"^{Christian Nodal} | |
| April 1 | "Me niego"^{Reik featuring Ozuna & Wisin} | "Me dejé llevar"^{Christian Nodal} | |
| April 8 | "Me niego"^{Reik featuring Ozuna & Wisin} | "Para sacarte de mi vida"^{Alejandro Fernández featuring Los Tigres del Norte} | |
| April 15 | "Me niego"^{Reik featuring Ozuna & Wisin} | "Para sacarte de mi vida"^{Alejandro Fernández featuring Los Tigres del Norte} | |
| April 22 | "El préstamo"^{Maluma} | "Para sacarte de mi vida"^{Alejandro Fernández featuring Los Tigres del Norte} | |
| April 29 | "Me niego"^{Reik featuring Ozuna & Wisin} | "Para sacarte de mi vida"^{Alejandro Fernández featuring Los Tigres del Norte} | |
| May 6 | "El préstamo"^{Maluma} | "Para sacarte de mi vida"^{Alejandro Fernández featuring Los Tigres del Norte} | |
| May 13 | "El préstamo"^{Maluma} | "Para sacarte de mi vida"^{Alejandro Fernández featuring Los Tigres del Norte} | |
| May 20 | "El préstamo"^{Maluma} | "Para sacarte de mi vida"^{Alejandro Fernández featuring Los Tigres del Norte} | |
| May 27 | "Me niego"^{Reik featuring Ozuna & Wisin} | "Necesitaría"^{Lucero} | |
| June 3 | "Me niego"^{Reik featuring Ozuna & Wisin} | "Te fallé"^{Christian Nodal} | |
| June 10 | "Me niego"^{Reik featuring Ozuna & Wisin} | "Te fallé"^{Christian Nodal} | |
| June 17 | "Calidad y cantidad"^{La Arrolladora Banda El Limón} | "Te fallé"^{Christian Nodal} | |
| June 24 | "Calidad y cantidad"^{La Arrolladora Banda El Limón} | "Te fallé"^{Christian Nodal} | |
| July 1 | "Calidad y cantidad"^{La Arrolladora Banda El Limón} | "Te fallé"^{Christian Nodal} | |
| July 8 | "Te fallé"^{Christian Nodal} | "Te fallé"^{Christian Nodal} | |
| July 15 | "Te fallé"^{Christian Nodal} | "Te fallé"^{Christian Nodal} | |
| July 22 | "No me acuerdo"^{Thalía featuring Natti Natasha} | "En peligro de extinción"^{La Adictiva Banda San José de Mesillas} | |
| July 29 | "No me acuerdo"^{Thalía featuring Natti Natasha} | "En peligro de extinción"^{La Adictiva Banda San José de Mesillas} | |
| August 5 | "No me acuerdo"^{Thalía featuring Natti Natasha} | "En peligro de extinción"^{La Adictiva Banda San José de Mesillas} | |
| August 12 | "No me acuerdo"^{Thalía featuring Natti Natasha} | "Oye Mujer"^{Raymix featuring Juanes} | |
| August 19 | "Clandestino"^{Shakira & Maluma} | "Oye Mujer"^{Raymix featuring Juanes} | |
| August 26 | "Oye mujer"^{Raymix featuring. Juanes} | "Oye Mujer"^{Raymix featuring Juanes} | |
| September 2 | "Clandestino"^{Shakira & Maluma} | "Oye Mujer"^{Raymix featuring Juanes} | |
| September 9 | "Clandestino"^{Shakira & Maluma} | "Oye Mujer"^{Raymix featuring Juanes} | |
| September 16 | "Amigos con derechos"^{Reik & Maluma} | "Segun tus labios"^{Los Plebes del Rancho de Ariel Camacho} | |
| September 23 | "Amigos con derechos"^{Reik & Maluma} | "Segun tus labios"^{Los Plebes del Rancho de Ariel Camacho} | |
| September 30 | "Amigos con derechos"^{Reik & Maluma} | "No te contaron mal"^{Christian Nodal} | |
| October 7 | "Amigos con derechos"^{Reik & Maluma} | "No te contaron mal"^{Christian Nodal} | |
| October 14 | "Amigos con derechos"^{Reik & Maluma} | "No te contaron mal"^{Christian Nodal} | |
| October 21 | "Amigos con derechos"^{Reik & Maluma} | "No te contaron mal"^{Christian Nodal} | |
| October 28 | "Amigos con derechos"^{Reik & Maluma} | "No te contaron mal"^{Christian Nodal} | |
| November 4 | "Amigos con derechos"^{Reik & Maluma} | "No te contaron mal"^{Christian Nodal} | |
| November 11 | "Se vuelve loca"^{CNCO} | "No te contaron mal"^{Christian Nodal} | |
| November 18 | "El beso"^{Mon Laferte} | "No te contaron mal"^{Christian Nodal} | |
| November 25 | "El beso"^{Mon Laferte} | "No te contaron mal"^{Christian Nodal} | |
| December 2 | "El beso"^{Mon Laferte} | "Con todo incluido"^{La Adictiva Banda San José de Mesillas} | |
| December 9 | "Te amaré"^{Alex Fernández} | "Con todo incluido"^{La Adictiva Banda San José de Mesillas} | |
| December 16 | "Te amaré"^{Alex Fernández} | "Con todo incluido"^{La Adictiva Banda San José de Mesillas} | |
| December 23 | "Made for Now"^{Janet Jackson & Daddy Yankee} | "Con todo incluido"^{La Adictiva Banda San José de Mesillas} | |
| December 30 | "Made for Now"^{Janet Jackson & Daddy Yankee} | "Con todo incluido"^{La Adictiva Banda San José de Mesillas} | |

=== Pop ===
This chart ranks Spanish-language songs from all genres, except for Regional Mexican music (which is listed under the "Popular" chart).

The blue background indicates the best-performing Pop song of 2018.

| Issue date | Song (Audience) | Song (Spins) | Ref. |
|---|---|---|---|
| January 7 | "Échame la culpa"^{Luis Fonsi featuring Demi Lovato} | "Échame la culpa"^{Luis Fonsi featuring Demi Lovato} | |
| January 14 | "Échame la culpa"^{Luis Fonsi featuring Demi Lovato} | "Échame la culpa"^{Luis Fonsi featuring Demi Lovato} | |
| January 21 | "Échame la culpa"^{Luis Fonsi featuring Demi Lovato} | "Échame la culpa"^{Luis Fonsi featuring Demi Lovato} | |
| January 28 | "Échame la culpa"^{Luis Fonsi featuring Demi Lovato} | "Échame la culpa"^{Luis Fonsi featuring Demi Lovato} | |
| February 4 | "Échame la culpa"^{Luis Fonsi featuring Demi Lovato} | "Échame la culpa"^{Luis Fonsi featuring Demi Lovato} | |
| February 11 | "Échame la culpa"^{Luis Fonsi featuring Demi Lovato} | "Échame la culpa"^{Luis Fonsi featuring Demi Lovato} | |
| February 18 | "Échame la culpa"^{Luis Fonsi featuring Demi Lovato} | "Échame la culpa"^{Luis Fonsi featuring Demi Lovato} | |
| February 25 | "Échame la culpa"^{Luis Fonsi featuring Demi Lovato} | "Échame la culpa"^{Luis Fonsi featuring Demi Lovato} | |
| March 4 | "Échame la culpa"^{Luis Fonsi featuring Demi Lovato} | "Échame la culpa"^{Luis Fonsi featuring Demi Lovato} | |
| March 11 | "Échame la culpa"^{Luis Fonsi featuring Demi Lovato} | "Échame la culpa"^{Luis Fonsi featuring Demi Lovato} | |
| March 18 | "Me niego"^{Reik featuring Ozuna & Wisin} | "Échame la culpa"^{Luis Fonsi featuring Demi Lovato} | |
| March 25 | "Me niego"^{Reik featuring Ozuna & Wisin} | "No hay nadie más"^{Sebastián Yatra} | |
| April 1 | "Me niego"^{Reik featuring Ozuna & Wisin} | "No hay nadie más"^{Sebastián Yatra} | |
| April 8 | "Me niego"^{Reik featuring Ozuna & Wisin} | "No hay nadie más"^{Sebastián Yatra} | |
| April 15 | "Me niego"^{Reik featuring Ozuna & Wisin} | "No hay nadie más"^{Sebastián Yatra} | |
| April 22 | "Me niego"^{Reik featuring Ozuna & Wisin} | "Me niego"^{Reik featuring Ozuna & Wisin} | |
| April 29 | "Me niego"^{Reik featuring Ozuna & Wisin} | "Me niego"^{Reik featuring Ozuna & Wisin} | |
| May 6 | "Me niego"^{Reik featuring Ozuna & Wisin} | "No hay nadie más"^{Sebastián Yatra} | |
| May 13 | "Me niego"^{Reik featuring Ozuna & Wisin} | "Me niego"^{Reik featuring Ozuna & Wisin} | |
| May 20 | "Me niego"^{Reik featuring Ozuna & Wisin} | "Me niego"^{Reik featuring Ozuna & Wisin} | |
| May 27 | "Me niego"^{Reik featuring Ozuna & Wisin} | "Me niego"^{Reik featuring Ozuna & Wisin} | |
| June 3 | "Me niego"^{Reik featuring Ozuna & Wisin} | "Me niego"^{Reik featuring Ozuna & Wisin} | |
| June 10 | "Me niego"^{Reik featuring Ozuna & Wisin} | "Me niego"^{Reik featuring Ozuna & Wisin} | |
| June 17 | "Me muero"^{Carlos Rivera} | "X"^{Nicky Jam & J Balvin} | |
| June 24 | "Me muero"^{Carlos Rivera} | "X"^{Nicky Jam & J Balvin} | |
| July 1 | "Me muero"^{Carlos Rivera} | "Cuando nadie ve"^{Morat} | |
| July 8 | "Me muero"^{Carlos Rivera} | "Cuando nadie ve"^{Morat} | |
| July 15 | "Me muero"^{Carlos Rivera} | "Cuando nadie ve"^{Morat} | |
| July 22 | "Cuando nadie ve"^{Morat} | "Cuando nadie ve"^{Morat} | |
| July 29 | "Cuando nadie ve"^{Morat} | "Cuando nadie ve"^{Morat} | |
| August 5 | "Cuando nadie ve"^{Morat} | "Cuando nadie ve"^{Morat} | |
| August 12 | "Cuando nadie ve"^{Morat} | "Cuando nadie ve"^{Morat} | |
| August 19 | "Clandestino"^{Shakira featuring Maluma} | "Cuando nadie ve"^{Morat} | |
| August 26 | "Clandestino"^{Shakira featuring Maluma} | "Cuando nadie ve"^{Morat} | |
| September 2 | "Clandestino"^{Shakira featuring Maluma} | "Cuando nadie ve"^{Morat} | |
| September 9 | "Clandestino"^{Shakira featuring Maluma} | "Cuando nadie ve"^{Morat} | |
| September 16 | "Eso no va a suceder"^{Ha*Ash} | "No es justo"^{J Balvin featuring Zion & Lennox} | |
| September 23 | "Eso no va a suceder"^{Ha*Ash} | "No es justo"^{J Balvin featuring Zion & Lennox} | |
| September 30 | "Amigos con derechos"^{Reik featuring Maluma} | "No es justo"^{J Balvin featuring Zion & Lennox} | |
| October 7 | "Amigos con derechos"^{Reik featuring Maluma} | "Amigos con derechos"^{Reik featuring Maluma} | |
| October 14 | "Amigos con derechos"^{Reik featuring Maluma} | "Amigos con derechos"^{Reik featuring Maluma} | |
| October 21 | "Amigos con derechos"^{Reik featuring Maluma} | "Amigos con derechos"^{Reik featuring Maluma} | |
| October 28 | "Amigos con derechos"^{Reik featuring Maluma} | "Amigos con derechos"^{Reik featuring Maluma} | |
| November 4 | "Amigos con derechos"^{Reik featuring Maluma} | "Amigos con derechos"^{Reik featuring Maluma} | |
| November 11 | "Amigos con derechos"^{Reik featuring Maluma} | "Amigos con derechos"^{Reik featuring Maluma} | |
| November 18 | "Amigos con derechos"^{Reik featuring Maluma} | "Amigos con derechos"^{Reik featuring Maluma} | |
| November 25 | "Amigos con derechos"^{Reik featuring Maluma} | "El beso"^{Mon Laferte} | |
| December 2 | "El beso"^{Mon Laferte} | "El beso"^{Mon Laferte} | |
| December 9 | "Amigos con derechos"^{Reik & Maluma} | "El beso"^{Mon Laferte} | |
| December 16 | "Te esperé"^{Jesse & Joy} | "El beso"^{Mon Laferte} | |
| December 23 | "Te esperé"^{Jesse & Joy} | "Me lloras"^{Gloria Trevi featuring Charly Black} | |
| December 30 | "Te esperé"^{Jesse & Joy} | "Desconocidos"^{Mau y Ricky with Camilo Echeverry & Manuel Turizo} | |

=== Popular ===
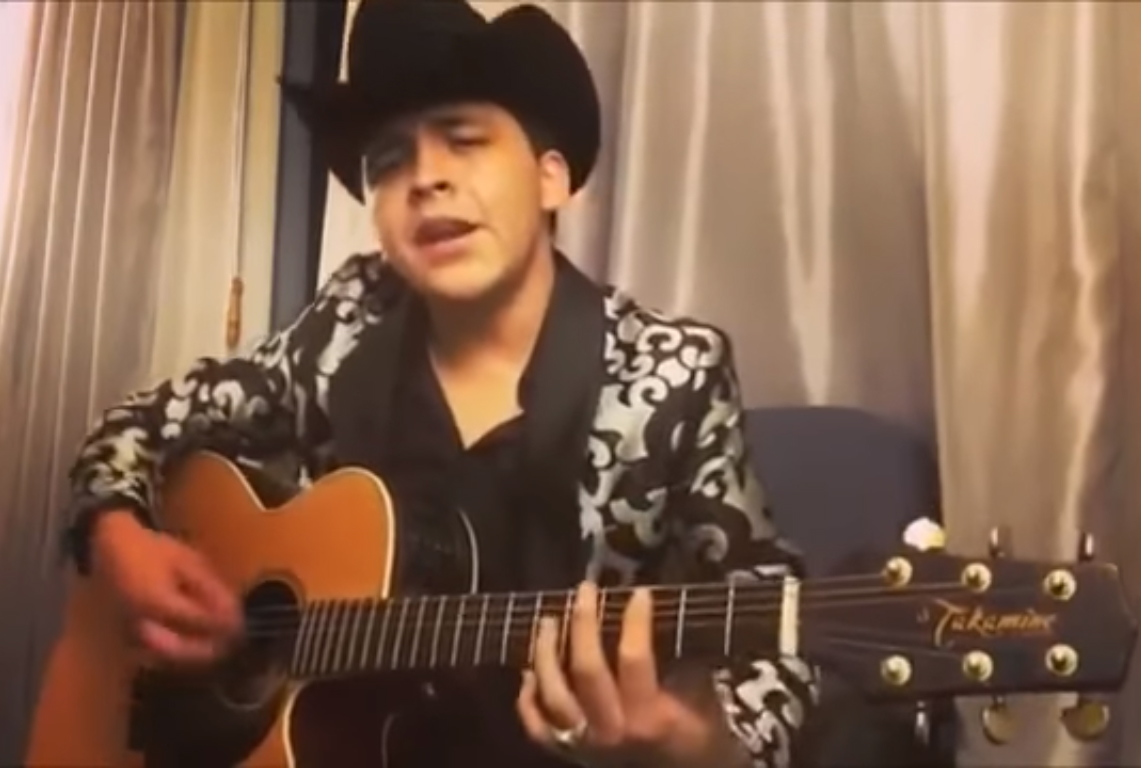
Singer-songwriter Christian Nodal (pictured) has earned three Popular number-one songs in 2018.

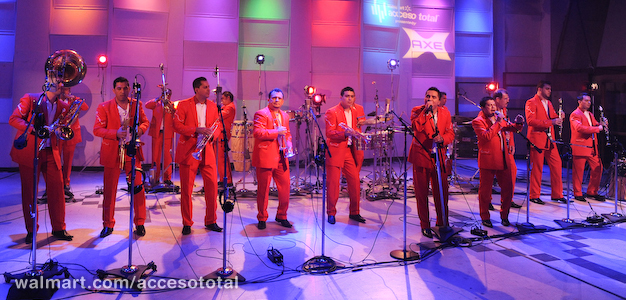
La Arrolladora Banda El Limón (pictured) have earned three Popular number-one songs in 2018.

This chart ranks songs that fall under the Regional Mexican category.

The yellow background indicates the best-performing Popular song of 2018.

| Issue date | Song (Audience) | Song (Spins) | Ref. |
|---|---|---|---|
| January 7 | "Entre beso y beso"^{La Arrolladora Banda El Limón} | "Seremos"^{El Bebeto} | |
| January 14 | "Entre beso y beso"^{La Arrolladora Banda El Limón} | "Entre beso y beso"^{La Arrolladora Banda El Limón} | |
| January 21 | "Entre beso y beso"^{La Arrolladora Banda El Limón} | "Esta es tu canción"^{La Adictiva Banda San José de Mesillas} | |
| January 28 | "Entre beso y beso"^{La Arrolladora Banda El Limón} | "Esta es tu canción"^{La Adictiva Banda San José de Mesillas} | |
| February 4 | "Entre beso y beso"^{La Arrolladora Banda El Limón} | "Esta es tu canción"^{La Adictiva Banda San José de Mesillas} | |
| February 11 | "Antecedentes de culpa"^{Alfredo Olivas} | "Entre beso y beso"^{La Arrolladora Banda El Limón} | |
| February 18 | "Entre beso y beso"^{La Arrolladora Banda El Limón} | "Antecedentes de culpa"^{Alfredo Olivas} | |
| February 25 | "Entre beso y beso"^{La Arrolladora Banda El Limón} | "Antecedentes de culpa"^{Alfredo Olivas} | |
| March 4 | "Entre beso y beso"^{La Arrolladora Banda El Limón} | "Antecedentes de culpa"^{Alfredo Olivas} | |
| March 11 | "Antecedentes de culpa"^{Alfredo Olivas} | "Me dejé llevar"^{Christian Nodal} | |
| March 18 | "Antecedentes de culpa"^{Alfredo Olivas} | "Me dejé llevar"^{Christian Nodal} | |
| March 25 | "Antecedentes de culpa"^{Alfredo Olivas} | "Me dejé llevar"^{Christian Nodal} | |
| April 1 | "Antecedentes de culpa"^{Alfredo Olivas} | "Me dejé llevar"^{Christian Nodal} | |
| April 8 | "Mitad y mitad"^{Calibre 50} | "Mitad y mitad"^{Calibre 50} | |
| April 15 | "Calidad y cantidad"^{La Arrolladora Banda El Limón} | "Mitad y mitad"^{Calibre 50} | |
| April 22 | "Tu postura"^{Banda MS} | "Mitad y mitad"^{Calibre 50} | |
| April 29 | "Tu postura"^{Banda MS} | "Buscábamos lo mismo"^{Los Plebes del Rancho de Ariel Camacho} | |
| May 6 | "Calidad y cantidad"^{La Arrolladora Banda El Limón} | "Mitad y mitad"^{Calibre 50} | |
| May 13 | "Calidad y cantidad"^{La Arrolladora Banda El Limón} | "Mitad y mitad"^{Calibre 50} | |
| May 20 | "Calidad y cantidad"^{La Arrolladora Banda El Limón} | "Mitad y mitad"^{Calibre 50} | |
| May 27 | "Calidad y cantidad"^{La Arrolladora Banda El Limón} | "Necesitaría"^{Lucero} | |
| June 3 | "Calidad y cantidad"^{La Arrolladora Banda El Limón} | "Te fallé"^{Christian Nodal} | |
| June 10 | "Calidad y cantidad"^{La Arrolladora Banda El Limón} | "Te fallé"^{Christian Nodal} | |
| June 17 | "Calidad y cantidad"^{La Arrolladora Banda El Limón} | "Te fallé"^{Christian Nodal} | |
| June 24 | "Calidad y cantidad"^{La Arrolladora Banda El Limón} | "Te fallé"^{Christian Nodal} | |
| July 1 | "Calidad y cantidad"^{La Arrolladora Banda El Limón} | "Te fallé"^{Christian Nodal} | |
| July 8 | "Te fallé"^{Christian Nodal} | "Te fallé"^{Christian Nodal} | |
| July 15 | "Te fallé"^{Christian Nodal} | "Te fallé"^{Christian Nodal} | |
| July 22 | "Calidad y cantidad"^{La Arrolladora Banda El Limón} | "En peligro de extinción"^{La Adictiva Banda San José de Mesillas} | |
| July 29 | "Mi sorpresa fuiste tú"^{Calibre 50} | "En peligro de extinción"^{La Adictiva Banda San José de Mesillas} | |
| August 5 | "Mi sorpresa fuiste tú"^{Calibre 50} | "En peligro de extinción"^{La Adictiva Banda San José de Mesillas} | |
| August 12 | "En peligro de extinción"^{La Adictiva Banda San José de Mesillas} | "En peligro de extinción"^{La Adictiva Banda San José de Mesillas} | |
| August 19 | "Mi sorpresa fuiste tú"^{Calibre 50} | "Mi sorpresa fuiste tú"^{Calibre 50} | |
| August 26 | "Mi sorpresa fuiste tú"^{Calibre 50} | "Mi sorpresa fuiste tú"^{Calibre 50} | |
| September 2 | "La mejor de las historias"^{Alfredo Olivas} | "Según tus labios"^{Los Plebes del Rancho de Ariel Camacho} | |
| September 9 | "Mi sorpresa fuiste tú"^{Calibre 50} | "Según tus labios"^{Los Plebes del Rancho de Ariel Camacho} | |
| September 16 | "Mi sorpresa fuiste tú"^{Calibre 50} | "Según tus labios"^{Los Plebes del Rancho de Ariel Camacho} | |
| September 23 | "Mi sorpresa fuiste tú"^{Calibre 50} | "Según tus labios"^{Los Plebes del Rancho de Ariel Camacho} | |
| September 30 | "Tu eres la razón"^{La Arrolladora Banda El Limón} | "No te contaron mal"^{Christian Nodal} | |
| October 7 | "La mejor de las historias"^{Alfredo Olivas} | "No te contaron mal"^{Christian Nodal} | |
| October 14 | "Tu eres la razón"^{La Arrolladora Banda El Limón} | "No te contaron mal"^{Christian Nodal} | |
| October 21 | "No te contaron mal"^{Christian Nodal} | "No te contaron mal"^{Christian Nodal} | |
| October 28 | "No te contaron mal"^{Christian Nodal} | "No te contaron mal"^{Christian Nodal} | |
| November 4 | "No te contaron mal"^{Christian Nodal} | "No te contaron mal"^{Christian Nodal} | |
| November 11 | "No te contaron mal"^{Christian Nodal} | "No te contaron mal"^{Christian Nodal} | |
| November 18 | "No te contaron mal"^{Christian Nodal} | "No te contaron mal"^{Christian Nodal} | |
| November 25 | "No te contaron mal"^{Christian Nodal} | "No te contaron mal"^{Christian Nodal} | |
| December 2 | "No te contaron mal"^{Christian Nodal} | "Con todo incluido"^{La Adictiva Banda San José de Mesillas} | |
| December 9 | "No te contaron mal"^{Christian Nodal} | "Con todo incluido"^{La Adictiva Banda San José de Mesillas} | |
| December 16 | "Con todo incluido"^{La Adictiva Banda San José de Mesillas} | "Con todo incluido"^{La Adictiva Banda San José de Mesillas} | |
| December 23 | "Con todo incluido"^{La Adictiva Banda San José de Mesillas} | "Con todo incluido"^{La Adictiva Banda San José de Mesillas} | |
| December 30 | "Con todo incluido"^{La Adictiva Banda San José de Mesillas} | "Con todo incluido"^{La Adictiva Banda San José de Mesillas} | |

=== Anglo ===
This chart ranks English-language songs from all genres.

The green background indicates the best-performing Anglo song of 2018.

| Issue date | Song (Audience) | Song (Spins) | Ref. |
|---|---|---|---|
| January 7 | "Havana"^{Camila Cabello featuring Young Thug} | "Havana"^{Camila Cabello featuring Young Thug} | |
| January 14 | "Havana"^{Camila Cabello featuring Young Thug} | "Havana"^{Camila Cabello featuring Young Thug} | |
| January 21 | "Havana"^{Camila Cabello featuring Young Thug} | "Havana"^{Camila Cabello featuring Young Thug} | |
| January 28 | "Havana"^{Camila Cabello featuring Young Thug} | "Havana"^{Camila Cabello featuring Young Thug} | |
| February 4 | "Anywhere"^{Rita Ora} | "Anywhere"^{Rita Ora} | |
| February 11 | "Anywhere"^{Rita Ora} | "Anywhere"^{Rita Ora} | |
| February 18 | "Breathe"^{Jax Jones featuring Ina Wroldsen} | "Havana"^{Camila Cabello featuring Young Thug} | |
| February 25 | "Breathe"^{Jax Jones featuring Ina Wroldsen} | "Anywhere"^{Rita Ora} | |
| March 4 | "Breathe"^{Jax Jones featuring Ina Wroldsen} | "Anywhere"^{Rita Ora} | |
| March 11 | "Breathe"^{Jax Jones featuring Ina Wroldsen} | "Anywhere"^{Rita Ora} | |
| March 18 | "Breathe"^{Jax Jones featuring Ina Wroldsen} | "Anywhere"^{Rita Ora} | |
| March 25 | "Anywhere"^{Rita Ora} | "Anywhere"^{Rita Ora} | |
| April 1 | "Breathe"^{Jax Jones featuring Ina Wroldsen} | "Anywhere"^{Rita Ora} | |
| April 8 | "Breathe"^{Jax Jones featuring Ina Wroldsen} | "Anywhere"^{Rita Ora} | |
| April 15 | "Breathe"^{Jax Jones featuring Ina Wroldsen} | "Anywhere"^{Rita Ora} | |
| April 22 | "Breathe"^{Jax Jones featuring Ina Wroldsen} | "The Middle"^{Zedd, Maren Morris & Grey} | |
| April 29 | "One Kiss"^{Calvin Harris & Dua Lipa} | "The Middle"^{Zedd, Maren Morris & Grey} | |
| May 6 | "One Kiss"^{Calvin Harris & Dua Lipa} | "One Kiss"^{Calvin Harris & Dua Lipa} | |
| May 13 | "One Kiss"^{Calvin Harris & Dua Lipa} | "One Kiss"^{Calvin Harris & Dua Lipa} | |
| May 20 | "One Kiss"^{Calvin Harris & Dua Lipa} | "One Kiss"^{Calvin Harris & Dua Lipa} | |
| May 27 | "One Kiss"^{Calvin Harris & Dua Lipa} | "One Kiss"^{Calvin Harris & Dua Lipa} | |
| June 3 | "One Kiss"^{Calvin Harris & Dua Lipa} | "One Kiss"^{Calvin Harris & Dua Lipa} | |
| June 10 | "One Kiss"^{Calvin Harris & Dua Lipa} | "One Kiss"^{Calvin Harris & Dua Lipa} | |
| June 17 | "One Kiss"^{Calvin Harris & Dua Lipa} | "One Kiss"^{Calvin Harris & Dua Lipa} | |
| June 24 | "One Kiss"^{Calvin Harris & Dua Lipa} | "One Kiss"^{Calvin Harris & Dua Lipa} | |
| July 1 | "One Kiss"^{Calvin Harris & Dua Lipa} | "One Kiss"^{Calvin Harris & Dua Lipa} | |
| July 8 | "One Kiss"^{Calvin Harris & Dua Lipa} | "One Kiss"^{Calvin Harris & Dua Lipa} | |
| July 15 | "One Kiss"^{Calvin Harris & Dua Lipa} | "One Kiss"^{Calvin Harris & Dua Lipa} | |
| July 22 | "One Kiss"^{Calvin Harris & Dua Lipa} | "One Kiss"^{Calvin Harris & Dua Lipa} | |
| July 29 | "One Kiss"^{Calvin Harris & Dua Lipa} | "One Kiss"^{Calvin Harris & Dua Lipa} | |
| August 5 | "One Kiss"^{Calvin Harris & Dua Lipa} | "One Kiss"^{Calvin Harris & Dua Lipa} | |
| August 12 | "One Kiss"^{Calvin Harris & Dua Lipa} | "One Kiss"^{Calvin Harris & Dua Lipa} | |
| August 19 | "One Kiss"^{Calvin Harris & Dua Lipa} | "One Kiss"^{Calvin Harris & Dua Lipa} | |
| August 26 | "One Kiss"^{Calvin Harris & Dua Lipa} | "One Kiss"^{Calvin Harris & Dua Lipa} | |
| September 2 | "One Kiss"^{Calvin Harris & Dua Lipa} | "One Kiss"^{Calvin Harris & Dua Lipa} | |
| September 9 | "In My Feelings"^{Drake} | "In My Feelings"^{Drake} | |
| September 16 | "Promises"^{Calvin Harris & Sam Smith} | "In My Feelings"^{Drake} | |
| September 23 | "Promises"^{Calvin Harris & Sam Smith} | "Promises"^{Calvin Harris & Sam Smith} | |
| September 30 | "Promises"^{Calvin Harris & Sam Smith} | "Promises"^{Calvin Harris & Sam Smith} | |
| October 7 | "Promises"^{Calvin Harris & Sam Smith} | "Promises"^{Calvin Harris & Sam Smith} | |
| October 14 | "Promises"^{Calvin Harris & Sam Smith} | "Promises"^{Calvin Harris & Sam Smith} | |
| October 21 | "Promises"^{Calvin Harris & Sam Smith} | "Promises"^{Calvin Harris & Sam Smith} | |
| October 28 | "Promises"^{Calvin Harris & Sam Smith} | "Promises"^{Calvin Harris & Sam Smith} | |
| November 4 | "In My Mind"^{Dynoro & Gigi D'Agostino} | "Promises"^{Calvin Harris & Sam Smith} | |
| November 11 | "Happier"^{Marshmello & Bastille} | "Promises"^{Calvin Harris & Sam Smith} | |
| November 18 | "Happier"^{Marshmello & Bastille} | "Promises"^{Calvin Harris & Sam Smith} | |
| November 25 | "In My Mind"^{Dynoro & Gigi D'Agostino} | "Happier"^{Marshmello & Bastille} | |
| December 2 | "Promises"^{Calvin Harris & Sam Smith} | "Happier"^{Marshmello & Bastille} | |
| December 9 | "Happier"^{Marshmello & Bastille} | "Happier"^{Marshmello & Bastille} | |
| December 16 | "Happier"^{Marshmello & Bastille} | "Happier"^{Marshmello & Bastille} | |
| December 23 | "Made for Now"^{Janet Jackson & Daddy Yankee} | "Made for Now"^{Janet Jackson & Daddy Yankee} | |
| December 30 | "Made for Now"^{Janet Jackson & Daddy Yankee} | "Made for Now"^{Janet Jackson & Daddy Yankee} | |

== Chart history (Streaming) ==
The orange background indicates the best-performing Streaming song of 2018.

| Issue date | Song | Artist(s) | Ref. |
|---|---|---|---|
| January 18 | "Bella" | Wolfine | |
| January 25 | "Bella" | Wolfine | |
| February 1 | "Bella" | Wolfine | |
| February 8 | "Bella" | Wolfine | |
| February 15 | "Bella" | Wolfine | |
| March 1 | "Amorfoda" | Bad Bunny | |
| March 8 | "Amorfoda" | Bad Bunny | |
| March 15 | "Bella" | Wolfine | |
| March 22 | "X (Equis)" | Nicky Jam & J Balvin | |
| April 5 | "X (Equis)" | Nicky Jam & J Balvin | |
| April 12 | "X (Equis)" | Nicky Jam & J Balvin | |
| April 19 | "X (Equis)" | Nicky Jam & J Balvin | |
| April 26 | "X (Equis)" | Nicky Jam & J Balvin | |
| May 3 | "X (Equis)" | Nicky Jam & J Balvin | |
| May 10 | "X (Equis)" | Nicky Jam & J Balvin | |
| May 17 | "Te boté" | Nio García featuring Darell, Ozuna & Nicky Jam | |
| May 31 | "Te boté" | Nio García featuring Darell, Ozuna & Nicky Jam | |
| June 7 | "Te boté" | Nio García featuring Darell, Ozuna & Nicky Jam | |
| June 14 | "Te boté" | Nio García featuring Darell, Ozuna & Nicky Jam | |
| June 21 | "Te boté" | Nio García featuring Darell, Ozuna & Nicky Jam | |
| June 28 | "Te boté" | Nio García featuring Darell, Ozuna & Nicky Jam | |
| July 5 | "Te boté" | Nio García featuring Darell, Ozuna & Nicky Jam | |
| July 19 | "Te boté" | Nio García featuring Darell, Ozuna & Nicky Jam | |
| August 2 | "Te boté" | Nio García featuring Darell, Ozuna & Nicky Jam | |
| August 9 | "Te boté" | Nio García featuring Darell, Ozuna & Nicky Jam | |
| August 16 | "Te boté" | Nio García featuring Darell, Ozuna & Nicky Jam | |
| August 23 | "No es justo" | J Balvin featuring Zion & Lennox | |
| August 30 | "Vaina loca" | Ozuna & Manuel Turizo | |
| December 6 | "Calma" | Pedro Capó featuring Farruko | |
| December 12 | "Calma" | Pedro Capó featuring Farruko | |

== See also ==
- List of number-one albums of 2018 (Mexico)
