= Antecedentes de culpa =

Single by Alfredo Olivas
- Language: Spanish
- English title: "History of Guilt"
- Released: 17 November 2017
- Genre: Norteño
- Length: 3:16
- Label: Sony Music Entertainment U.S. Latin
- Songwriter(s): Alfredo Olivas

Alfredo Olivas singles chronology
| "El problema" (2017) | "Antecedentes de culpa" (2017) |

"Antecedentes de culpa" ("History of guilt") is a song written and recorded by Mexican singer-songwriter Alfredo Olivas. It was released on 17 November 2017 as the third single of his album "La Rueda de la Fortuna".

== Composition ==
"Antecedentes de culpa" is a norteño song written by Olivas; the song describes a man feeling guilty after a heated argument with his girlfriend while he was drunk.

== Music video ==
The music video for the song was produced by Manuel Gayosso Films and was released on February 13, 2018, three months after the single was released on Digital download and Radio. The video contains footage of Olivas' performance at the Feria de Querétaro on December 8, 2017. Upon its release, the video reached #6 on the Mexico YouTube Trends (Tendencias) list. The video has gained more than 90 million of views on YouTube.

== Charts ==
| Chart (2018) | Peak position |
|---|---|
| Guatemala General (Monitor Latino) | 3 |
| Guatemala Regional Mexicano (Monitor Latino) | 1 |
| Mexico General (Monitor Latino) | 1 |
| Mexico Popular (Monitor Latino) | 1 |

== See also ==
- List of number-one songs of 2018 (Guatemala)
- List of number-one songs of 2018 (Mexico)
