= List of number-one songs of 2018 (Colombia) =

This is a list of the number-one songs of 2018 in Colombia according to National-Report and Monitor Latino. Both charts are based on airplay across radio stations in Colombia; Monitor Latino uses the Radio Tracking Data, LLC in real time, whereas National-Report uses a system by Media-Scanner. Monitor Latino's charts are compiled from Monday to Sunday, while National-Report's charts are compiled from Friday to Thursday.

Besides the General chart, Monitor Latino also publishes "Vallenato", "Crossover", "Pop", "Tropical", "Urbano", "Popular" and "Anglo" charts for Colombia. National-Report also provides charts with those names, with the addition of "Latino" and "Rock" charts. Beginning in the June 17 week, Monitor Latino ceased to publish the separate Audience and Spins charts, instead publishing a combined chart.

== Chart history (Monitor Latino) ==
Issue Date	Audience		Spins		Ref.
Issue Date	Song	Artist(s)	Song	Artist(s)	Ref.
January 7	"Robarte un Beso"	Carlos Vives ft. Sebastián Yatra	"Robarte un beso"	Carlos Vives ft. Sebastián Yatra	
January 14	"Robarte un Beso"	Carlos Vives ft. Sebastián Yatra	"Robarte un beso"	Carlos Vives ft. Sebastián Yatra	
January 21	"Amantes"	Greeicy Rendón ft. Mike Bahía	"Robarte un beso"	Carlos Vives ft. Sebastián Yatra	
January 28	"Amantes"	Greeicy Rendón ft. Mike Bahía	"Machika"	J Balvin ft. Jeon & Anitta	
February 4	"Machika"	J Balvin ft. Jeon & Anitta	"Machika"	J Balvin ft. Jeon & Anitta	
February 11	"Corazón"	Maluma ft. Nego do Borel	"Machika"	J Balvin ft. Jeon & Anitta	
February 18	"Nuestro secreto"	Carlos Vives	"Machika"	J Balvin ft. Jeon & Anitta	
February 25	"Nuestro secreto"	Carlos Vives	"Nuestro secreto"	Carlos Vives	
March 4	"Nuestro secreto"	Carlos Vives	"Nuestro secreto"	Carlos Vives	
March 11	"Nuestro secreto"	Carlos Vives	"Me niego"	Reik ft. Ozuna & Wisin	
March 18	"Me niego"	Reik ft. Ozuna & Wisin	"Me niego"	Reik ft. Ozuna & Wisin	
March 25	"Me niego"	Reik ft. Ozuna & Wisin	"Me niego"	Reik ft. Ozuna & Wisin	
April 1	"Dura"	Daddy Yankee	"Me niego"	Reik ft. Ozuna & Wisin	
April 8	"Me niego"	Reik ft. Ozuna & Wisin	"Me niego"	Reik ft. Ozuna & Wisin	
April 15	"Me niego"	Reik ft. Ozuna & Wisin	"Me niego"	Reik ft. Ozuna & Wisin	
April 22	"Me niego"	Reik ft. Ozuna & Wisin	"Me niego"	Reik ft. Ozuna & Wisin	
April 29	"Me niego"	Reik ft. Ozuna & Wisin	"Me niego"	Reik ft. Ozuna & Wisin	
May 6	"Me niego"	Reik ft. Ozuna & Wisin	"Me niego"	Reik ft. Ozuna & Wisin	
May 13	"Me niego"	Reik ft. Ozuna & Wisin	"Me niego"	Reik ft. Ozuna & Wisin	
May 20	"Me niego"	Reik ft. Ozuna & Wisin	"Me niego"	Reik ft. Ozuna & Wisin	
May 27	"Me niego"	Reik ft. Ozuna & Wisin	"Me niego"	Reik ft. Ozuna & Wisin	
June 3	"Me niego"	Reik ft. Ozuna & Wisin	"Me niego"	Reik ft. Ozuna & Wisin	
June 10	"Me niego"	Reik ft. Ozuna & Wisin	"Me niego"	Reik ft. Ozuna & Wisin	
Issue Date	Audience				Ref.
Issue Date	Song		Artist(s)		Ref.
June 17	"Hoy tengo tiempo"		Carlos Vives		
June 24	"Hoy tengo tiempo"		Carlos Vives		
July 1	"Hoy tengo tiempo"		Carlos Vives		
July 8	"Hoy tengo tiempo"		Carlos Vives		
July 15	"Hoy tengo tiempo"		Carlos Vives		
July 22	"Hoy tengo tiempo"		Carlos Vives		
July 29	"Hoy tengo tiempo"		Carlos Vives		
August 5	"Hoy tengo tiempo"		Carlos Vives		
August 12	"Justicia"		Silvestre Dangond ft. Natti Natasha		
August 19	"Justicia"		Silvestre Dangond ft. Natti Natasha		
August 26	"Justicia"		Silvestre Dangond ft. Natti Natasha		
September 2	"Justicia"		Silvestre Dangond ft. Natti Natasha		
September 9	"Justicia"		Silvestre Dangond ft. Natti Natasha		
September 16	"Justicia"		Silvestre Dangond ft. Natti Natasha		
September 23	"Justicia"		Silvestre Dangond ft. Natti Natasha		
September 30	"Justicia"		Silvestre Dangond ft. Natti Natasha		
October 7	"Confesión"		Pipe Bueno		
October 14	"Confesión"		Pipe Bueno		
October 21	"Amigos con derechos"		Reik ft. Maluma		
October 28	"Amigos con derechos"		Reik ft. Maluma		
November 4	"Amigos con derechos"		Reik ft. Maluma		
November 11	"Amigos con derechos"		Reik ft. Maluma		
Issue Date	Audience		Spins		Ref.
Issue Date	Song	Artist(s)	Song	Artist(s)	Ref.
November 18	"Taki Taki"	DJ Snake ft. Selena Gomez, Ozuna, Cardi B	"Amigos con Derechos"	Maluma ft. Reik	
November 25	"Taki Taki"	DJ Snake ft. Selena Gomez, Ozuna, Cardi B	"Amigos con Derechos"	Maluma ft. Reik	
December 2	"Taki Taki"	DJ Snake ft. Selena Gomez, Ozuna, Cardi B	"Pa Olvidarte"	Chocquibtown	
December 8	"Taki Taki"	DJ Snake ft. Selena Gomez, Ozuna, Cardi B	"Pa Olvidarte"	Chocquibtown	
Issue Date	Audience				Ref.
Issue Date	Song		Artist(s)		Ref.
December 15	"Pa Olvidarte"		Chocquibtown		
December 22	"Calma"		Pedro Capó		
December 29	"Calma"		Pedro Capó		

== Chart history (National Report) ==
Issue Date	Audience		Spins		Ref.
Issue Date	Song	Artist(s)	Song	Artist(s)	Ref.
February 2	"Machika"	J Balvin ft. Jeon & Anitta	"Machika"	J Balvin ft. Jeon & Anitta	
February 9	"Machika"	J Balvin ft. Jeon & Anitta	"Machika"	J Balvin ft. Jeon & Anitta	
February 16	"Corazón"	Maluma ft. Nego do Borel	"Machika"	J Balvin ft. Jeon & Anitta	
February 23	"Nuestro secreto"	Carlos Vives	"Nuestro secreto"	Carlos Vives	
March 2	"Nuestro secreto"	Carlos Vives	"Nuestro secreto"	Carlos Vives	
March 9	"Nuestro secreto"	Carlos Vives	"Nuestro secreto"	Carlos Vives	
March 16	"Nuestro secreto"	Carlos Vives	"Nuestro secreto"	Carlos Vives	
March 23	"Nuestro secreto"	Carlos Vives	"Nuestro secreto"	Carlos Vives	
March 30	"Nuestro secreto"	Carlos Vives	"Nuestro secreto"	Carlos Vives	
April 6	"Me niego"	Reik ft. Ozuna & Wisin	"Me niego"	Reik ft. Ozuna & Wisin	
April 13	"Me niego"	Reik ft. Ozuna & Wisin	"Me niego"	Reik ft. Ozuna & Wisin	
April 20	"Me niego"	Reik ft. Ozuna & Wisin	"Me niego"	Reik ft. Ozuna & Wisin	
April 27	"Me niego"	Reik ft. Ozuna & Wisin	"Me niego"	Reik ft. Ozuna & Wisin	
May 4	"Me niego"	Reik ft. Ozuna & Wisin	"Me niego"	Reik ft. Ozuna & Wisin	
May 11	"Me niego"	Reik ft. Ozuna & Wisin	"Me niego"	Reik ft. Ozuna & Wisin	
May 18	"Me niego"	Reik ft. Ozuna & Wisin	"Me niego"	Reik ft. Ozuna & Wisin	
May 25	"Me niego"	Reik ft. Ozuna & Wisin	"Me niego"	Reik ft. Ozuna & Wisin	
June 1	"Me niego"	Reik ft. Ozuna & Wisin	"Me niego"	Reik ft. Ozuna & Wisin	
June 8	"Hoy tengo tiempo"	Carlos Vives	"Me niego"	Reik ft. Ozuna & Wisin	
June 15	"Hoy tengo tiempo"	Carlos Vives	"Hoy tengo tiempo"	Carlos Vives	
June 22	"Hoy tengo tiempo"	Carlos Vives	"Hoy tengo tiempo"	Carlos Vives	
June 29	"Hoy tengo tiempo"	Carlos Vives	"Hoy tengo tiempo"	Carlos Vives	
July 6	"Hoy tengo tiempo"	Carlos Vives	"Hoy tengo tiempo"	Carlos Vives	
July 13	"Hoy tengo tiempo"	Carlos Vives	"Hoy tengo tiempo"	Carlos Vives	
July 20	"Hoy tengo tiempo"	Carlos Vives	"Hoy tengo tiempo"	Carlos Vives	
July 27	"Hoy tengo tiempo"	Carlos Vives	"Hoy tengo tiempo"	Carlos Vives	
August 3	"No es justo"	J Balvin ft. Zion & Lennox	"Clandestino"	Shakira & Maluma	
August 10	"No es justo"	J Balvin ft. Zion & Lennox	"Clandestino"	Shakira & Maluma	
August 17	"No es justo"	J Balvin ft. Zion & Lennox	"Clandestino"	Shakira & Maluma	
August 24	"No es justo"	J Balvin ft. Zion & Lennox	"Justicia"	Silvestre Dangond & Natti Natasha	
August 31	"No es justo"	J Balvin ft. Zion & Lennox	"Confesión"	Pipe Bueno	
September 7	"No es justo"	J Balvin ft. Zion & Lennox	"Confesión"	Pipe Bueno	
September 14	"No es justo"	J Balvin ft. Zion & Lennox	"Justicia"	Silvestre Dangond & Natti Natasha	
September 21	"Mocca"	Lalo Ebratt & Trápical	"Justicia"	Silvestre Dangond & Natti Natasha	
September 28	"No es justo"	J Balvin ft. Zion & Lennox	"Confesión"	Pipe Bueno	
October 5	"No es justo"	J Balvin ft. Zion & Lennox	"Confesión"	Pipe Bueno	
October 12	"Mocca (Remix)"	Lalo Ebratt ft. J Balvin & Trápical	"Confesión"	Pipe Bueno	
October 19	"Mocca (Remix)"	Lalo Ebratt ft. J Balvin & Trápical	"Confesión"	Pipe Bueno	
October 26	"Mocca (Remix)"	Lalo Ebratt ft. J Balvin & Trápical	"Confesión"	Pipe Bueno	
November 2	"Mocca (Remix)"	Lalo Ebratt ft. J Balvin & Trápical	"Amigos con Derechos"	Maluma ft. Reik	
November 9	"Amigos con Derechos"	Maluma ft. Reik	"Amigos con Derechos"	Maluma ft. Reik	
November 16	"Taki Taki"	DJ Snake ft. Selena Gomez, Ozuna, Cardi B	"Amigos con Derechos"	Maluma ft. Reik	
November 23	"Taki Taki"	DJ Snake ft. Selena Gomez, Ozuna, Cardi B	"Pa Olvidarte"	Chocquibtown	
November 30	"Taki Taki"	DJ Snake ft. Selena Gomez, Ozuna, Cardi B	"Pa Olvidarte"	Chocquibtown	
December 7	"Taki Taki"	DJ Snake ft. Selena Gomez, Ozuna, Cardi B	"Pa Olvidarte"	Chocquibtown	
December 14	"Taki Taki"	DJ Snake ft. Selena Gomez, Ozuna, Cardi B	"Pa Olvidarte"	Chocquibtown	
December 21	"Calma"	Pedro Capó	"Pa Olvidarte"	Chocquibtown	
December 28	"Calma"	Pedro Capó	"Pa Olvidarte"	Chocquibtown	
