= Me Niego =

2018 single by Reik

Single by Reik featuring Ozuna and Wisin

from the album Ahora
- Language: Spanish
- English title: "I Refuse"
- Released: February 16, 2018
- Genre: Reggaeton; pop rock
- Length: 3:42
- Label: Sony Music Entertainment México
- Songwriters: Jesús Navarro; Julio Ramírez; Gilberto Marín Espinoza; Juan Carlos Ozuna; Juan Luis Morera; Christian Linares; Víctor Torres; Marcos Torres
- Producer: Los Legendarios

Reik singles chronology
"Un amor de verdad" (2017)	"Me Niego" (2018)	"Amigos Con Derechos" (2018)

Ozuna singles chronology
"Sobredosis" (2018)	"Me niego" (2018)	"Quisiera Alejarme" (2018)

Wisin singles chronology
"Quisiera alejarme" (2018)	"Me niego" (2018)

"Me Niego" ("I refuse") is a song by Mexican band Reik featuring Puerto Rican singers Ozuna and Wisin. It was released on February 16, 2018, as the lead single off the band's sixth studio album, Ahora. The song was written by Reik members Jesús Navarro, Julio Ramírez, Gilberto Marín Espinoza, as well as Ozuna, Wisin, and "Los Legendarios" duo Christian Linares and Víctor Torres. Topping the charts in Bolivia, Colombia, Costa Rica, Guatemala, El Salvador, and Mexico, it also served as the theme song to the Mexican telenovela Tenías que ser tú, which starred Ariadne Díaz and Andrés Palacios.

"Me Niego" marks the first time that Reik has recorded a reggaeton song, as they are famous for their pop rock ballads. It is the group's first single to enter the Billboard Hot 100.

== Background and release ==
According to Reik's lead singer Jesús Navarro, "[he] was one of those people who are afraid of change", and he stated that "as Pop artists, we should learn from Urban singers, they're always helping each other, without envy or anything like that". Fellow member Gilberto Marín commented that "Sometimes, experimenting with different things and styles will take us away from what people would expect from us, what Reik usually does, but at the same time it defines that our sound is more universal".

As Reik's members were working on the song, Ozuna heard it and wanted to participate on it, as did Wisin later on.

== Music video ==
The music video for the song, directed by Nuno Gómez, was filmed in Miami, Florida, US. It was released on February 16, 2018. The man of the video is the Venezuelan actor Carlos Felipe Alvarez and the girl is the also Venezuelan actress Ornella de la Rosa. As a curiosity, they were both partners in real life at the time of shooting the video.

== Track listings ==
- Digital download
1. "Me Niego (featuring Ozuna and Wisin)" – 3:42
- Digital download – Pop version
1. "Me Niego (featuring Ozuna and Wisin)" – 4:13
- Digital download – Solo Pop version
1. "Me Niego" – 3:29

== Charts ==
=== Weekly charts ===
Chart (2018)	Peak position
Argentina (Argentina Hot 100)	9
Argentina (Monitor Latino)	1
Bolivia (Monitor Latino)	1
Chile (Monitor Latino)	3
Colombia (Monitor Latino)	1
Colombia (National-Report)	1
Costa Rica (Monitor Latino)	1
Dominican Republic (Monitor Latino)	15
Ecuador (National-Report)	1
El Salvador (Monitor Latino)	1
Guatemala (Monitor Latino)	1
Italy (FIMI)	39
Mexico (Monitor Latino)	1
Mexico Airplay (Billboard)	1
Nicaragua (Monitor Latino)	5
Peru (Monitor Latino)	1
Portugal (AFP)	76
Spain (PROMUSICAE)	2
Switzerland (Schweizer Hitparade)	63
US Billboard Hot 100	77
US Hot Latin Songs (Billboard)	6
US Latin Airplay (Billboard)	1
US Latin Rhythm Airplay (Billboard)	1
Venezuela (National-Report)	20

2025 weekly chart performance for "Me Niego"
Chart (2025)	Peak position
Russia Streaming (TopHit)	98

=== Monthly charts ===
2025 monthly chart performance for "Me Niego"
Chart (2025)	Peak position
Russia Streaming (TopHit)	90

=== Year-end charts ===
Chart (2018)	Position
Argentina (Monitor Latino)	7
Italy (FIMI)	86
Portugal (AFP)	183
Spain (PROMUSICAE)	5
US Hot Latin Songs (Billboard)	10

== Certifications ==
Region	Certification	Certified units/sales
Italy (FIMI)	Platinum	50,000^{‡}
Mexico (AMPROFON)	2× Diamond+4× Platinum	840,000^{‡}
Spain (Promusicae)	5× Platinum	300,000^{‡}
United States (RIAA)	21× Platinum (Latin)	1,260,000^{‡}
^{‡} Sales+streaming figures based on certification alone.

== Release history ==
Region	Date	Version	Format	Label
Various	February 16, 2018	Single version	Digital download; streaming	Sony Latin
Various	June 22, 2018	Pop version	Digital download; streaming	Sony Latin
Various	June 22, 2018	Solo pop version	Digital download; streaming	Sony Latin

== See also ==
- List of number-one songs of 2018 (Bolivia)
- List of number-one songs of 2018 (Colombia)
- List of number-one songs of 2018 (Guatemala)
- List of number-one songs of 2018 (Mexico)
- List of airplay number-one hits of the 2010s (Argentina)
- List of Billboard Argentina Hot 100 top-ten singles in 2018
- List of Billboard number-one Latin songs of 2018
