= List of number-one albums of 2018 (Mexico) =

Top 100 Mexico is a record chart published weekly by AMPROFON (Asociación Mexicana de Productores de Fonogramas y Videogramas), a non-profit organization composed by Mexican and multinational record companies. This association tracks record sales (physical and digital) in Mexico. Since May 2013, some positions of the chart are published in the official Twitter account of AMPROFON including the number one position.

== Chart history ==
The yellow background indicates the best-performing album of 2018.

Chart date	Album	Artist	Reference(s)
January 18	Juntos	Timbiriche	
January 25	Camila	Camila Cabello	
February 1	Juntos	Timbiriche	
February 8	Juntos	Timbiriche	
February 15	Juntos	Timbiriche	
March 1	¡México Por Siempre!	Luis Miguel	
March 8	Bolero de Oro de la Música Tropical	Carlos Cuevas	
March 15	Sobre el Amor y sus Efectos Secundarios	Morat	
March 29	.5	CD9	
April 5	Celebrando a una Leyenda	Leo Dan	
April 19	Celebrando a una Leyenda	Leo Dan	
April 26	Celebrando a una Leyenda	Leo Dan	
May 17	Celebrando a una Leyenda	Leo Dan	
May 24	Celebrando a una Leyenda	Leo Dan	
June 7	Celebrando a una Leyenda	Leo Dan	
June 14	Esto Sí Es Cumbia	Los Ángeles Azules	
June 21	Celebrando a una Leyenda	Leo Dan	
June 28	Esto Sí Es Cumbia	Los Ángeles Azules	
July 5	Esto Sí Es Cumbia	Los Ángeles Azules	
July 12	Esto Sí Es Cumbia	Los Ángeles Azules	
July 19	Esto Sí Es Cumbia	Los Ángeles Azules	
August 30	Sweetener	Ariana Grande	
September 6	MTV Unplugged: El Desconecte	Molotov	
September 20	Guerra	Carlos Rivera	
September 27	Guerra	Carlos Rivera	
October 4	Guerra	Carlos Rivera	
October 11	Guerra	Carlos Rivera	
October 18	Trench	Twenty One Pilots	
October 25	Guerra	Carlos Rivera	
November 1	Balas perdidas	Morat	
November 8	Bohemian Rhapsody	Queen	
November 15	Bohemian Rhapsody	Queen	
November 22	Bohemian Rhapsody	Queen	
November 29	Bohemian Rhapsody	Queen	
December 6	Bohemian Rhapsody	Queen	
December 13	Bohemian Rhapsody	Queen	
December 20	Bohemian Rhapsody	Queen	
December 27	Bohemian Rhapsody	Queen	

== See also ==
- List of number-one songs of 2018 (Mexico)
