= 1, 2, 3 (Sofía Reyes song) =

Single by Sofía Reyes featuring Jason Derulo and De La Ghetto

from the album Mal de Amores
- Released: February 16, 2018
- Genre: Reggaeton
- Length: 3:21
- Label: Warner Latina
- Songwriters: Sofía Reyes; Jason Derulo; De La Ghetto; Nicole Zignago; Ricardo Montaner; Jon Leone; Charlie Guerrero
- Producers: Jon Leone; Ricky Montaner

Sofía Reyes singles chronology
"Tell Me" (2017)	"1, 2, 3" (2018)	"Bittersweet" (2018)

Jason Derulo singles chronology
"Tip Toe" (2017)	"1, 2, 3" (2018)	"Colors" (2018)

De La Ghetto singles chronology
"Sé Que Quieres" (2018)	"1, 2, 3" (2018)	"Ya Es Hora" (2018)

Music video
- "1, 2, 3" on YouTube

"1, 2, 3" (Spanish: [ˈun dos ˈtɾes]) is a song by Mexican singer Sofía Reyes featuring American singers Jason Derulo and De La Ghetto. It was released as a single on February 16, 2018. The song was written by Reyes, Derulo, Ghetto, Nicole Zignago, Ricardo Montaner, Jon Leone and Charlie Guerrero.

== Background ==
While talking about the song, Sofía Reyes said;

"I have been very anxious about this single and can't wait for my SoCrew to listen to it. "1, 2, 3" is a unique blend of three very different genres and vibes (Latin, pop and urban) which brings a new style to my portfolio but still maintains my essence.

== Music video ==
The music video for the song, directed by Mike Ho, was shot in Los Angeles. It premiered via Reyes' YouTube channel on February 16, 2018, and received a nomination for a Lo Nuestro Award for Video of the Year.

== Charts ==
=== Weekly charts ===
Weekly chart performance for "1, 2, 3"
Chart (2018–2023)	Peak position
Argentina (Argentina Hot 100)	19
Austria (Ö3 Austria Top 40)	32
Belarus Airplay (TopHit)	17
Belgium (Ultratip Bubbling Under Flanders)	11
Belgium (Ultratip Bubbling Under Wallonia)	23
Bolivia (Monitor Latino)	1
Chile (Monitor Latino)	3
CIS Airplay (TopHit)	7
Colombia (Monitor Latino)	19
Colombia (National-Report)	26
Dominican Republic (SodinPro)	24
Ecuador (National-Report)	3
El Salvador (Monitor Latino)	8
Finland (Suomen virallinen lista)	17
France (SNEP)	96
Global Excl. US (Billboard)	153
Guatemala (Monitor Latino)	10
Hungary (Dance Top 40)	31
Hungary (Rádiós Top 40)	5
Hungary (Single Top 40)	9
Kazakhstan Airplay (TopHit)	21
Lebanon (Lebanese Top 20)	8
Lithuania Airplay (TopHit)	168
Mexico Airplay (Billboard)	3
Netherlands (Single Top 100)	95
Poland (Polish Airplay Top 100)	32
Poland (Dance Top 50)	23
Portugal (AFP)	60
Romania (Airplay 100)	1
Russia Airplay (TopHit)	4
Slovakia Airplay (ČNS IFPI)	8
Spain (Promusicae)	5
Sweden Heatseeker (Sverigetopplistan)	2
Switzerland (Schweizer Hitparade)	63
Ukraine Airplay (TopHit)	122
US Hot Latin Songs (Billboard)	24
US Latin Airplay (Billboard)	31
US Latin Rhythm Airplay (Billboard)	18
Venezuela (National-Report)	19

=== Monthly charts ===
Monthly chart performance for "1, 2, 3"
Chart (2022–2023)	Peak position
Belarus Airplay (TopHit)	20
CIS Airplay (TopHit)	7
Kazakhstan Airplay (TopHit)	25
Russia Airplay (TopHit)	4

=== Year-end charts ===
2018 year-end chart performance for "1, 2, 3"
Chart (2018)	Position
Argentina (Monitor Latino)	4
Romania (Airplay 100)	6
Spain (PROMUSICAE)	8

2022 year-end chart performance for "1, 2, 3"
Chart (2022)	Position
CIS Airplay (TopHit)	51
Russia Airplay (TopHit)	38

2023 year-end chart performance for "1, 2, 3"
Chart (2023)	Position
Belarus Airplay (TopHit)	122
Kazakhstan Airplay (TopHit)	52

== Certifications ==
Region	Certification	Certified units/sales
Denmark (IFPI Danmark)	Gold	45,000^{‡}
France (SNEP)	Platinum	200,000^{‡}
Italy (FIMI)	Gold	25,000^{‡}
Poland (ZPAV)	2× Platinum	100,000^{‡}
Portugal (AFP)	Gold	5,000^{‡}
Spain (Promusicae)	4× Platinum	240,000^{‡}
United Kingdom (BPI)	Silver	200,000^{‡}
United States (RIAA)	11× Platinum (Latin)	660,000^{‡}
^{‡} Sales+streaming figures based on certification alone.

== Release history ==
Region	Date	Format(s)	Label	Ref.
Various	February 16, 2018; 2022	Digital download	Warner Latina	
United States	June 5, 2018	Contemporary hit radio	Warner Bros.	

== See also ==
- List of Airplay 100 number ones of the 2010s
- List of number-one songs of 2018 (Bolivia)
