= Los Ronisch =

Los Ronisch are a Bolivian cumbia band. They originate from Cochabamba and are one of the most popular cumbia bands in South America. The press have called this band "the box-office record breakers" due to its vast popularity among people in Bolivia, Peru, Argentina, Ecuador and other countries.

== History ==
The band is composed of six brothers:

- First voice: Walter Rodriguez
- Keyboards: Renán Rodriguez
- First Guitar: Remberto Rodriguez
- Bass: Héctor Rodriguez (Director)++
- Drums: Norberto Rodriguez
- Singer: Fernando Rodriguez

The live concerts include an animator, German Zambrana being one of them during the late 90s. Later they added this talented musicians:

- Bass: Elmer Rodriguez
- Second Guitar: Rodrigo Choque
- Second Voice: Edson Rodriguez
- Percussion: Alexsander Escalera

Los Ronisch, named after the family's old German Rönisch piano, started playing in the late 80's, focusing more in a type of Rock that is similar to new wave, with influences from disco, electronic music, and pop. One of their first hits, Isabel, remains a classic of pop music in Bolivia. This type of music regarded as "Disco" in Bolivia was also practiced by another popular Bolivian band called Maroyu. Towards the end of the 90's the band remained highly popular; however, it shifted the focus of its music towards Cumbia (Los Ronisch played Cumbia and Huayño regularly since their start in the late 80's). This shift to a more electronic sound, relying more heavily on the keyboards and the sampler as a backbone, made some people in Peru relate the band's style to Tecnocumbia. This shift can be heard in the "Regresa" album of 1999. The popularity of the band exponentially increased with the release of "Regresa" and the singles "Amigos Traigan Cerveza" and "Prefiero Estar Lejos", making the band play numerous cities throughout South America, USA and Europe (Spain).

== Discography (incomplete) ==
- Los Ronisch - Isabel - soledad -Un Sueño Hecho Realidad - 1989 (vol1)
- Los Ronisch - Princesa - 1990 (vol2)
- Los Ronisch - Digas lo que digas - 1991 (vol 3)
- Los Ronisch - La plaza - 1992
- Los Ronisch - dime dime
- Los Ronisch - te quiero (vol 6)
- Los Ronisch - promesas cuando ya no me quieras
- Los Ronisch - traicionera
- Los Ronisch - quisiera yo decirte
- Los Ronisch - Época de oro - 1998
- Los Ronisch - Regresa - 1999
- Los Ronisch - Destrozas Mi Corazón - 2001
- Los Ronisch - Siempre Imitados, Nunca Igualados - 2004
- Los Ronisch - Corazones Rotos - 2008
- Los Ronisch - Nunca te olvidaré - 2017

== Musical style ==
Cumbia, Huayño, Technocumbia or Tecnocumbia, Chicha, Rock & Pop, Disco.
