= Échame la Culpa =

2017 single by Luis Fonsi and Demi Lovato

Single by Luis Fonsi and Demi Lovato

from the album Vida
- Language: Spanish; English
- English title: "Put the Blame on Me"
- Released: November 17, 2017
- Genre: Latin pop; reggaeton
- Length: 2:53
- Label: Universal Latin; Republic; Island
- Songwriters: Luis Fonsi; Alejandro Rengifo; Mauricio Rengifo; Andrés Torres
- Producers: Andrés Torres; Mauricio Rengifo

Luis Fonsi singles chronology
| "Kissing Strangers (Remix)" (2017) | "Échame la Culpa" (2017) | "Calypso" (2018) |

Demi Lovato singles chronology
| "Tell Me You Love Me" (2017) | "Échame la Culpa" (2017) | "I Believe" (2018) |

Music video
- "Échame la Culpa" on YouTube

"Échame la Culpa" (Spanish: [ˈetʃame la ˈkulpa]; transl. "Put the Blame on Me") is a song by Puerto Rican singer and songwriter Luis Fonsi and American singer Demi Lovato. Fonsi co-wrote the song with Alejandro Rengifo and its producers Andrés Torres and Mauricio Rengifo. It was released through Universal Music Latin Entertainment, Republic Records and Island Records on November 17, 2017, as the second single from his tenth studio album, Vida. On March 2, 2018, an English remix of the song titled "Not on You" was released.

The track received acclaim from music critics. It has reached number one in sixteen countries worldwide. It also reached number forty-six in the UK and forty-seven on the US Billboard Hot 100. The song is certified Platinum or higher in twelve countries, including Diamond in France, Mexico, and Poland.

== Release and promotion ==
Lovato first teased a photo from the music video shoot via Instagram on October 21, 2017, to which Fonsi commented: "What's up Demi..." He later posted a behind-the-scenes picture on his official Instagram account, captioned: "Finished! It's a wrap", to which Lovato replied: "Hola Fonsi". On November 1, 2017, MTV News reported that the collaboration would be titled "Échame la Culpa", a song Fonsi has been performing solo during live shows across the summer. In an interview with Billboard at iHeartRadio Fiesta Latina in Miami, Fonsi admitted: "It's a fun song, a fun record, we already filmed the video." He also revealed that the song would premiere in two weeks. In a clip shared by Billboard on November 13, 2017, Lovato and Fonsi can be seen meeting each other via a FaceTime call to discuss details about their collaboration. On November 14, 2017, Lovato took to social media to announce the song's release, along with a snippet of the song featuring only her part, as Fonsi posted a shot of himself lying in bed with pillows covered in the song's title. It was released onto iTunes for download three days later, and Fonsi published a photo that day of a truck with him and Lovato on it, as well as short quotes, including "¿Qué pasa Demi?" (English: What's up Demi?) and "Hey Fonsi". Fonsi told Viva Latino: "The lyrics are very joyful. It's that play on words, that famous cliché of 'It's not you, it's me' that many of us have used." On April 12, 2018, Fonsi performed the song live together with German singer Helene Fischer during a medley with "Despacito" at the German Echo Music Prize.

== Critical reception ==
The song received positive reviews from music critics. Jon Caramanica of The New York Times called the song "a jaunty, celebratory number", and felt Lovato singing in clipped Spanish is "only marginally less comfortable than the bumpy-edged English-language semi-soul she employs elsewhere on the song". Deepa Lakshmin of MTV News wrote that it is "equally infectious" as "Despacito". Ross McNeilage of the same publication deemed the song "an absolute powerhouse anthem that goes harder than 'Despacito' ever did", and gave credit to "Demi's flawless Spanish and [Fonsi and Lovato's] undeniable chemistry". Bianca Gracie of Fuse regarded it as "a welcomed refresher away from the ongoing 'Despacito' takeover".

== Music video ==
The music video first takes place in 1 bedroom, before the 6 meet up in an abandoned warehouse and hold a dance party. In its first 9 hours of release, the video accrued more than 9 views, a record for 10.

As of November 2025, "Échame la Culpa" has received over 2.4 billion views on YouTube.

== Live performances ==
The song experienced its debut live performance ever on February 25, 2018, at Teatro Colón in Buenos Aires, Argentina, where Fonsi performed it together with Argentine singer Tini. Fonsi and Lovato made their duet debut performance during Lovato's Tell Me You Love Me World Tour at the American Airlines Arena in Miami, United States on March 30, 2018. On April 12, 2018, Fonsi performed the song live together with German singer Helene Fischer during a medley with "Despacito" at the German Echo Music Prize. On May 27, 2018, Fonsi performed the song with Lovato during the BBC Music's Biggest Weekend. The song is included in both Luis Fonsi's Love + Dance World Tour and Lovato's Tell Me You Love Me World Tour set list. Fonsi later performed the song at the 2019 Pan American Games in Perú alongside Peruvian singer Leslie Shaw.

== Track listings ==
- Digital download
1. "Échame la Culpa" – 2:53
- Digital download – Not on You remix
1. "Échame la Culpa" (Not on You remix) – 2:53

== Charts ==
=== Weekly charts ===
Weekly chart performance for "Échame la Culpa"
| Chart (2017–18) | Peak position |
|---|---|
| Argentina (Monitor Latino) | 1 |
| Australia (ARIA) | 80 |
| Austria (Ö3 Austria Top 40) | 1 |
| Belgium (Ultratop 50 Flanders) | 9 |
| Belgium (Ultratop 50 Wallonia) | 3 |
| Bolivia (Monitor Latino) | 1 |
| Brazil (Top 100 Brasil) | 57 |
| Bulgaria Airplay (PROPHON) | 5 |
| Canada Hot 100 (Billboard) | 35 |
| Canada AC (Billboard) | 24 |
| Canada Hot AC (Billboard) | 40 |
| CIS Airplay (TopHit) | 13 |
| Chile (Monitor Latino) | 1 |
| Colombia (Monitor Latino) | 5 |
| Colombia (National-Report) | 5 |
| Costa Rica (Monitor Latino) | 1 |
| Croatia International Airplay (Top lista) | 13 |
| Czech Republic Airplay (ČNS IFPI) | 1 |
| Czech Republic Singles Digital (ČNS IFPI) | 18 |
| Dominican Republic (Monitor Latino) | 17 |
| Ecuador (National-Report) | 1 |
| El Salvador (Monitor Latino) | 1 |
| Euro Digital Songs (Billboard) | 7 |
| France (SNEP) | 18 |
| Germany (GfK) | 6 |
| Greece International (IFPI) | 16 |
| Guatemala (Monitor Latino) | 1 |
| Honduras (Monitor Latino) | 1 |
| Hungary (Dance Top 40) | 4 |
| Hungary (Rádiós Top 40) | 4 |
| Hungary (Single Top 40) | 2 |
| Hungary (Stream Top 40) | 5 |
| Ireland (IRMA) | 40 |
| Italy (FIMI) | 6 |
| Latvia (DigiTop100) | 51 |
| Lebanon Airplay (Lebanese Top 20) | 1 |
| Mexico (Monitor Latino) | 1 |
| Mexico Airplay (Billboard) | 1 |
| Netherlands (Dutch Top 40) | 2 |
| Netherlands (Mega Top 50) | 3 |
| Netherlands (Single Top 100) | 17 |
| New Zealand Heatseekers (RMNZ) | 3 |
| Nicaragua (Monitor Latino) | 5 |
| Norway (VG-lista) | 12 |
| Panama (Monitor Latino) | 1 |
| Paraguay (Monitor Latino) | 1 |
| Peru (Monitor Latino) | 1 |
| Philippines (Philippine Hot 100) | 48 |
| Poland Airplay (ZPAV) | 4 |
| Portugal (AFP) | 2 |
| Romania (Airplay 100) | 6 |
| Russia Airplay (TopHit) | 14 |
| Scottish Singles Sales (Official Charts) | 25 |
| Slovakia Airplay (ČNS IFPI) | 1 |
| Slovakia Singles Digital (ČNS IFPI) | 3 |
| Spain (Promusicae) | 1 |
| Sweden (Sverigetopplistan) | 6 |
| Switzerland (Schweizer Hitparade) | 2 |
| UK Singles (Official Charts) | 46 |
| Ukraine Airplay (TopHit) | 5 |
| Uruguay (Monitor Latino) | 1 |
| US Billboard Hot 100 | 47 |
| US Hot Latin Songs (Billboard) | 3 |
| US Latin Airplay (Billboard) | 1 |
| Venezuela (Monitor Latino) | 7 |

2025 weekly chart performance for "Échame la Culpa"
| Chart (2025) | Peak position |
|---|---|
| Estonia Airplay (TopHit) | 92 |

=== Monthly charts ===
Monthly chart performance for "Échame la Culpa"
| Chart (2018) | Peak position |
|---|---|
| Argentina (CAPIF) | 2 |
| Brazil Streaming (Pro Música) | 36 |
| Slovenia (SloTop50) | 1 |

=== Year-end charts ===
2017 year-end chart performance for "Échame la Culpa"
| Chart (2017) | Position |
|---|---|
| Hungary (Single Top 40) | 49 |
| Hungary (Stream Top 40) | 77 |

2018 year-end chart performance for "Échame la Culpa"
| Chart (2018) | Position |
|---|---|
| Argentina (Monitor Latino) | 2 |
| Austria (Ö3 Austria Top 40) | 12 |
| Belgium (Ultratop Flanders) | 15 |
| Belgium (Ultratop Wallonia) | 26 |
| Bolivia (Monitor Latino) | 3 |
| Canada (Canadian Hot 100) | 87 |
| El Salvador (Monitor Latino) | 7 |
| France (SNEP) | 46 |
| Germany (Official German Charts) | 10 |
| Hungary (Dance Top 40) | 11 |
| Hungary (Rádiós Top 40) | 8 |
| Hungary (Single Top 40) appel | 10 |
| Iceland (Plötutíóindi) | 45 |
| Italy (FIMI) | 28 |
| Netherlands (Dutch Top 40) | 7 |
| Netherlands (Single Top 100) | 57 |
| Poland (ZPAV) | 49 |
| Portugal (AFP) | 14 |
| Romania (Airplay 100) | 25 |
| Slovenia (SloTop50) | 2 |
| Spain (PROMUSICAE) | 12 |
| Sweden (Sverigetopplistan) | 49 |
| Switzerland (Schweizer Hitparade) | 3 |
| Uruguay (Monitor Latino) | 3 |
| US Hot Latin Songs (Billboard) | 7 |

2019 year-end chart performance for "Échame la Culpa"
| Chart (2019) | Position |
|---|---|
| Bolivia (Monitor Latino) | 89 |
| Hungary (Dance Top 40) | 74 |
| Slovenia (SloTop50) | 40 |

2020 year-end chart performance for "Échame la Culpa"
| Chart (2020) | Position |
|---|---|
| Argentina Airplay (Monitor Latino) | 97 |

== Certifications ==
Certifications and sales for "Échame la Culpa"
| Region | Certification | Certified units/sales |
|---|---|---|
| Austria (IFPI Austria) | Gold | 15,000^{‡} |
| Belgium (BRMA) | Platinum | 20,000^{‡} |
| Brazil (Pro-Música Brasil) | 2× Diamond | 320,000^{‡} |
| Canada (Music Canada) | Platinum | 80,000^{‡} |
| Denmark (IFPI Danmark) | Gold | 45,000^{‡} |
| France (SNEP) | Diamond | 333,333^{‡} |
| Germany (BVMI) | Platinum | 400,000^{‡} |
| Italy (FIMI) | 3× Platinum | 150,000^{‡} |
| Mexico (AMPROFON) | Diamond | 300,000^{‡} |
| New Zealand (RMNZ) | Gold | 15,000^{‡} |
| Norway (IFPI Norway) | 2× Platinum | 120,000^{‡} |
| Poland (ZPAV) | Diamond | 250,000^{‡} |
| Portugal (AFP) | 2× Platinum | 20,000^{‡} |
| Spain (Promusicae) | 4× Platinum | 160,000^{‡} |
| United Kingdom (BPI) | Silver | 200,000^{‡} |
| United States (RIAA) | 3× Platinum (Latin) | 180,000^{‡} |
Streaming
| Sweden (GLF) | 2× Platinum | 16,000,000^{†} |
^{‡} Sales+streaming figures based on certification alone.^{†} Streaming-only figures based on certification alone.

== Release history ==
Release dates for "Échame la Culpa"
| Region | Date | Format | Version | Label | Ref. |
|---|---|---|---|---|---|
| Various | November 17, 2017 | Digital download | Original | Universal Latin; Republic; Island | |
| Italy | December 8, 2017 | Contemporary hit radio | Original | Universal | |
| United States | January 30, 2018 | Contemporary hit radio | Original | Universal Latin | |
| Various | March 2, 2018 | Digital download | Not on You remix | Universal Latin; Republic; Island | |
| United States | March 6, 2018 | Rhythmic contemporary radio | Original | Universal Latin; Republic; Island | |
| Italy | March 9, 2018 | Contemporary hit radio | Not on You remix | Universal | |
| United Kingdom | May 4, 2018 | Contemporary hit radio | Not on You remix | Universal | |

== See also ==
- List of airplay number-one hits of the 2010s (Argentina)
- List of number-one hits of 2018 (Austria)
- List of number-one songs of 2018 (Bolivia)
- List of number-one songs of 2018 (Guatemala)
- List of number-one songs of 2018 (Lebanon)
- List of number-one songs of 2018 (Mexico)
- List of Billboard number-one Latin songs of 2018
