= Alfredo Olivas =

Mexican singer-songwriter (born 1993)

- Born: 1 October 1993 (age 33); Ciudad Obregón, Sonora, Mexico
- Occupations: Singer; songwriter; musician
- Years active: 2011–present
- Works: El Paciente
- Musical career
- Genre: Regional Mexican
- Instrument: Vocals
- Labels: Sonora MX Entertainment (2010-2012); Sahuaro Enterprise, Inc. (2012-present); Sony Music Latin (2014-2017); Fonovisa Records (2018-2026); Camiolvi, Inc (2011-present)

José Alfredo Olivas Rojas (born October 1, 1993) better known as Alfredo Olivas, is a Mexican singer-songwriter of regional Mexican music. He has recorded songs in several of its subgenres, including Sinaloan banda, pacific norteño, norteño-banda, mariachi, and country en Español. He is popularly known as "Alfredito" (little Alfredo) or "El Patroncito" (after a song on the eponymous album El Patroncito, 2011).

== Career ==
Since the age of nine, Olivas has written over 1,000 songs and released dozens of singles on independent labels. He signed to Fonovisa Records at the age of 16, releasing El Patroncito (his first solo album) in 2011. In 2014, Olivas moved to Sony's imprint Sahuaro Music. His most recent album, El Privilegio, was released in January 2015. A song from that album, "Mi Porvenir", was included in Billboard's chart highlights in the Mexican Regional Music category. The album charted in the number two spot on Billboard's Top Latin Albums (January 29, 2015), and also reached a peak position of number 2 on Billboard's Top Regional Mexican Albums chart. The song "Mi Porvenir" spent two weeks at #30 for Regional Mexican airplay, with a peak of #26. For the week of March 29, 2015, El Privilegio ranked #61 on the iTunes Top 100 Latin Albums chart.

One of his most popular corridos is "Las Vacaciones del Jefe", (The Boss's Vacation) which is included on El Patroncito, as well as on two compilation albums. This song begins with the line, "Yo no he matado a nadie... ultimamente," (I haven't killed anyone... lately). The related video received hundreds of thousands of hits on YouTube. The song reached a peak of #31 on Billboard's Regional Mexican Airplay chart.

Olivas has composed songs for several notable bands. Los Cuates de Sinaloa recorded Olivas' song "Tocando with the Mafia", which peaked at number 13 on Billboard's Top Regional Mexican Albums in 2011.

Olivas' most recent work moves away from the narcocorrido. He says that cartel violence in Mexico and the birth of his first child have motivated him to create more positive music, in a style known as "Norteña Romantica".

He has two solo albums, and many of his songs are included in several compilation albums, which are all collections of narcocorridos.

== 2015 shooting attack ==
On February 28, 2015, at the age of 20, Alfredo Olivas was shot eight times while performing on stage in Hidalgo del Parral, Chihuahua, México. Olivas was singing the song "Asi es esto", and bent down to toss his jacket to a female fan. The woman's boyfriend and two companions drew guns, firing twenty-four rounds. Olivas and several other men standing in the VIP section in front of the stage were shot. Olivas survived, but one of the three audience members shot in the incident died from their injuries shortly after. Three gunmen were arrested. The motivation for the shooting may have been jealousy. An audience member captured video of the shooting and later posted it to YouTube.

The city of Chihuahua has banned the performance of narcocorridos as a result of the shootings at Olivas' concert.

A few years later, on his album La Rueda De La Fortuna, Olivas released "El Paciente", which was inspired by the 2015 shooting.

== Discography ==
=== Solo albums ===
- Con El Pie Derecho (released August 13, 2010, by Camiolvi, Inc., under exclusive license to Fonovisa)
- El Patroncito (released January 11, 2011, by Fonovisa)
- Así Es Esto (released October 15, 2012, by Camiolvi, Inc., under exclusive license to Fonovisa)
- El Privilegio (released January 20, 2015, by Camiolvi, Inc., under exclusive license to Fonovisa)
- La Rueda de La Fortuna (released August 18, 2017, by Camiolvi, Inc., under exclusive license to Fonovisa)
- El Día De Los Muertos (released October 24, 2019, by Camiolvi, Inc., under exclusive license to Fonovisa)
- ALFA & OMEGA (released September 30, 2022, by Camiolvi, Inc., under exclusive license to Fonovisa)
- V1V0 (released February 27, 2025, by Camiolvi, Inc., under exclusive license to Fonovisa)
- V1V0 (En Vivo) - EP (released March 28, 2025, by Camiolvi, Inc., under exclusive license to Fonovisa)
- Esta Mi Pasión - EP (released September 30, 2026, by Camiolvi, Inc & ALFA & OMEGA PUBLISHING, distributed by The Orchard Enterprises)

=== Compilations ===
- 20 Corridos Bien Perrones (released August 5, 2014, by Fonovisa)
- Club Corridos: Corridos de Combate (released February 19, 2014, by SonoraMX)
- Club Corridos: Sinaloa Rifa! (released January 13, 2014, by Hyphy Music)
- Corridos #1 (released January 10, 2012, by Disa Latin Music/UMG Recordings Inc.)
